= 2018–19 La Liga =

88th season of La Liga

La Liga
- Season: 2018–19
- Dates: 17 August 2018 – 19 May 2019
- Champions: Barcelona; 26th title
- Relegated: Girona; Huesca; Rayo Vallecano
- Champions League: Barcelona; Atlético Madrid; Real Madrid; Valencia
- Europa League: Getafe; Sevilla; Espanyol
- Matches: 380
- Goals: 983 (2.59 per match)
- Top goalscorer: Lionel Messi (36 goals)
- Best goalkeeper: Jan Oblak (0.73 goals/match)
- Biggest home win: Barcelona 8–2 Huesca (2 September 2018)
- Biggest away win: Levante 0–5 Barcelona (16 December 2018)
- Highest scoring: Barcelona 8–2 Huesca (2 September 2018)
- Longest winning run: 8 matches Barcelona
- Longest unbeaten run: 23 matches Barcelona
- Longest winless run: 16 matches Huesca
- Longest losing run: 7 matches Rayo Vallecano
- Highest attendance: 93,265; Barcelona 5–1 Real Madrid (28 October 2018)
- Lowest attendance: 3,652; Eibar 3–0 Espanyol (21 January 2019)
- Attendance: 10,234,693 (26,933 per match)

The 2018–19 La Liga season, also known as LaLiga Santander for sponsorship reasons, was the 88th since its establishment. The season began on 17 August 2018 and concluded on 19 May 2019. Fixtures for the 2018–19 season were announced on 24 July 2018. This was the first La Liga season to use the VAR.

Barcelona were the defending champions, and they secured a second consecutive title with three games to spare following victory over Levante on 27 April. Huesca, Rayo Vallecano and Valladolid joined as the promoted clubs from the 2017–18 Segunda División. They replaced Málaga, Las Palmas and Deportivo La Coruña, who were relegated to the 2018–19 Segunda División.

This is the first season since 2008–09 that did not feature the league's all time second-highest scorer Cristiano Ronaldo, who departed to Juventus in the summer.

== Summary ==
Several clubs made managerial changes before the start of the season. Among them were Real Madrid, when Zinedine Zidane resigned following the club's third consecutive UEFA Champions League victory. He was replaced by Julen Lopetegui, who was managing the Spain national team at the 2018 FIFA World Cup in Russia at the time of announcement and was dismissed from that job as a result. Other incomers included Pablo Machín at Sevilla, who was hired after his success with newly promoted Girona the previous season.

In the transfer window, the biggest deal saw Real Madrid lose Cristiano Ronaldo to Juventus for a fee of €112 million; the Portuguese forward had scored 450 goals in 438 games during his nine years in the Spanish capital. Real Madrid's additions included Belgium international goalkeeper Thibaut Courtois for €35 million from Chelsea, and striker Mariano returned to the club from Lyon for €22 million. Defending champions Barcelona added Clément Lenglet to their defence, Arturo Vidal to midfield, and spent over €40 million on Brazilian forward Malcom. Players exiting Barcelona included Andrés Iniesta at the end of a successful 16-year-spell, as he signed for Vissel Kobe in Japan.

Veterans Gabi and Fernando Torres also left Atlético Madrid for new teams in Asia, while the same club welcomed in the likes of World Cup-winning French midfielder Thomas Lemar and Portugal's Gelson Martins. After a successful previous season, in which the team finished fourth and returned to the Champions League, Valencia made permanent the loan signing of Portuguese winger Gonçalo Guedes from Paris Saint-Germain and Geoffrey Kondogbia from Inter Milan. Forward Simone Zaza and midfielder João Cancelo both left to Italy, while Kevin Gameiro arrived as replacement. Athletic Bilbao sold Kepa Arrizabalaga to Chelsea for €80 million, a world record fee for a goalkeeper.

The tenth round of matches featured the first El Clásico of the season, which Barcelona won 5–1 at home against Real Madrid with a hat-trick by Luis Suárez. The result put Madrid into 9th place, and led to the dismissal of Lopetegui after only five months. Other early pace-setters included Sevilla with their prolific strike partnership of André Silva and Wissam Ben Yedder, Alavés who were briefly league leaders in mid-October, Espanyol, and Valladolid who had been taken over by former Brazil international Ronaldo.

== Teams ==
=== Promotion and relegation (pre-season) ===
A total of 20 teams will contest the league, including 17 sides from the 2017–18 season and three promoted from the 2017–18 Segunda División. This will include the two top teams from the Segunda División, and the winners of the play-offs.

Teams relegated to Segunda División

The first team to be relegated from La Liga were Málaga. Their relegation was ensured on 19 April 2018, following a late 0−1 defeat to Levante, ending their 10-year spell in the top division.

The second team to be relegated were Las Palmas, after a 0−4 home defeat to Deportivo Alavés on 22 April 2018, ending their three-year spell in the league.

The last team to be relegated were Deportivo La Coruña, following a 2−4 home loss to Barcelona on 29 April 2018. This result ensured Deportivo's third relegation in seven years, and also handed Barcelona their 25th La Liga title.

Teams promoted from Segunda División

On 21 May 2018, Huesca were promoted to La Liga for the first time ever by winning 2–0 at Lugo.

Rayo Vallecano was the second team to earn promotion to La Liga on 27 May 2018 by winning against Lugo as well, this time 1–0. Rayo returned after a two-year absence.

Valladolid was the last team to be promoted after beating Sporting Gijón and Numancia in the play-offs. Valladolid returned to top division after 4 years.

This was the first season since the 2014–15 season without any teams from the archipelagos of Spain (teams located on the Balearic Islands and Canary Islands) since Las Palmas was relegated and Tenerife failed to qualify for the promotion play-offs.

=== Stadia and locations ===
Location of teams in 2018–19 La Liga
Location of Community of Madrid teams in 2018–19 La Liga

Celta signed a sponsorship contract with Abanca to rename their stadium as Abanca-Balaídos.

Team	Location	Stadium	Capacity
Alavés	Vitoria-Gasteiz	Mendizorrotza	19,840
Athletic Bilbao	Bilbao	San Mamés	53,000
Atlético Madrid	Madrid	Wanda Metropolitano	68,000
Barcelona	Barcelona	Camp Nou	99,354
Celta Vigo	Vigo	Abanca-Balaídos	29,000
Eibar	Eibar	Ipurua	7,083
Espanyol	Cornellà de Llobregat	RCDE Stadium	40,000
Getafe	Getafe	Coliseum Alfonso Pérez	17,000
Girona	Girona	Montilivi	13,500
Huesca	Huesca	El Alcoraz	7,638
Leganés	Leganés	Butarque	12,450
Levante	Valencia	Ciutat de València	26,354
Rayo Vallecano	Madrid	Vallecas	14,708
Real Betis	Seville	Benito Villamarín	60,721
Real Madrid	Madrid	Santiago Bernabéu	81,044
Real Sociedad	San Sebastián	Anoeta	32,000
Sevilla	Seville	Ramón Sánchez Pizjuán	43,883
Valencia	Valencia	Mestalla	55,000
Valladolid	Valladolid	José Zorrilla	26,512
Villarreal	Villarreal	Estadio de la Cerámica	23,500

=== Matches outside Spain ===
On 16 August 2018, La Liga signed a 15-year agreement with Relevant Sports (owners of the International Champions Cup) to schedule one match per season within the United States. This would mark the first time ever that an official La Liga league match would be held there. The match between Girona and Barcelona, to be played on 27 January 2019, was selected to be played in Miami, but it required the approval of the Royal Spanish Football Federation. On 21 September 2018, the Spanish Football Federation denied approval of the match being held in Miami. On 26 October 2018, following a request for guidance from the Spanish Football Federation, US Soccer and CONCACAF, the FIFA Council discussed La Liga's proposal. At the end of the meeting, the FIFA Council stated that "Consistent with the opinion expressed by the Football Stakeholders Committee, the Council emphasised the sporting principle that official league matches must be played within the territory of the respective member association". On 13 December 2018, Barcelona left their disposition to play the match in Miami without effect.

=== Personnel and sponsorship ===
Team	Manager	Captain	Kit manufacturer	Shirt sponsor
Alavés	(Spain) Abelardo Fernández	(Spain) Manu García	Kelme	Betway, LEA,^{1} Araba-Álava,^{2} Integra Energía,^{3} Euskaltel^{3}
Athletic Bilbao	(Spain) Gaizka Garitano	(Spain) Markel Susaeta	New Balance	Kutxabank
Atlético Madrid	(Argentina) Diego Simeone	(Uruguay) Diego Godín	Nike	Plus500, Hyundai^{2}
Barcelona	(Spain) Ernesto Valverde	(Argentina) Lionel Messi	Nike	Rakuten, UNICEF,^{1} Beko^{2}
Celta Vigo	(Spain) Fran Escribá	(Spain) Hugo Mallo	Adidas	Estrella Galicia 0,0, Abanca,^{1} Grupo Recalvi^{3}
Eibar	(Spain) José Luis Mendilibar	(Spain) Asier Riesgo	Puma	AVIA, HiKOKI^{2}
Espanyol	(Spain) Rubi	(Spain) Javi López	Kelme	Riviera Maya, InnJoo^{1}^{3}
Getafe	(Spain) José Bordalás	(Spain) Jorge Molina	Joma	Tecnocasa Group, Reale Seguros,^{2} @getafecf^{3}
Girona	(Spain) Eusebio Sacristán	(Spain) Álex Granell	Umbro	Marathonbet, Costa Brava^{2}
Huesca	(Spain) Francisco	(Spain) Juanjo Camacho	Kelme	Huesca La Magia, DISA,^{1} Bodega Sommos,^{1} Grupo Cosehisa,^{2} El Dorado,^{3} Ambar 0,0^{3}
Leganés	(Argentina) Mauricio Pellegrino	(Spain) Unai Bustinza (Note: Captain Alexander Szymanowski was on a recovery from Pubitis injury effectively making Bustinza captain for the remainder of the season.)	Joma	Betway, Sambil Outlet Madrid,^{2} BeSoccer,^{3} Arriaga Asociados^{3}
Levante	(Spain) Paco López	(Spain) Pedro López	Macron	Betway, Baleària^{1}
Rayo Vallecano	(Spain) Paco Jémez	(Spain) Adri Embarba	Kelme	Creditea,^{1} Modalia.com^{1}
Real Betis	(Spain) Quique Setién	(Spain) Joaquín	Kappa	GreenEarth, Reale Seguros,^{2} BeSoccer,^{3} OTC Desks^{4}
Real Madrid	(France) Zinedine Zidane	(Spain) Sergio Ramos	Adidas	Emirates
Real Sociedad	(Spain) Imanol Alguacil	(Spain) Asier Illarramendi	Macron	Kutxabank,^{1} Reale Seguros^{2}
Sevilla	(Spain) Joaquín Caparrós	(Spain) Sergio Escudero	Nike	Playtika, Betfair,^{2} EverFX^{3}
Valencia	(Spain) Marcelino	(Spain) Dani Parejo	Adidas	BLU, beIN Sports,^{1} Sesderma,^{2} Alfa Romeo^{3}
Valladolid	(Spain) Sergio González	(Spain) Javi Moyano	Hummel	Cuatro Rayas, Junta of Castile and León,^{1} Integra Energía,^{2} Cultura y Turismo Valladolid^{3}
Villarreal	(Spain) Javier Calleja	(Spain) Bruno	Joma	Pamesa Cerámica, Endavant^{2}

1. On the back of shirt.
2. On the sleeves.
3. On the shorts.
4. On the away jersey.

=== Managerial changes ===
Team	Outgoing manager	Manner of departure	Date of vacancy	Position in table	Incoming manager	Date of appointment
Celta Vigo	(Spain) Juan Carlos Unzué	Sacked	21 May 2018	Pre-season	(Argentina) Antonio Mohamed	22 May 2018
Girona	(Spain) Pablo Machín	Signed for Sevilla	28 May 2018	Pre-season	(Spain) Eusebio Sacristán	7 June 2018
Real Madrid	(France) Zinedine Zidane	Resigned	31 May 2018	Pre-season	(Spain) Julen Lopetegui	12 June 2018
Real Sociedad	(Spain) Imanol Alguacil	End of contract	30 June 2018	Pre-season	(Spain) Asier Garitano	24 May 2018
Huesca	(Spain) Rubi	End of contract	30 June 2018	Pre-season	(Argentina) Leo Franco	28 May 2018
Sevilla	(Spain) Joaquín Caparrós	End of caretaker spell	30 June 2018	Pre-season	(Spain) Pablo Machín	28 May 2018
Espanyol	(Spain) David Gallego	End of caretaker spell	30 June 2018	Pre-season	(Spain) Rubi	3 June 2018
Leganés	(Spain) Asier Garitano	Signed for Real Sociedad	30 June 2018	Pre-season	(Argentina) Mauricio Pellegrino	2 June 2018
Athletic Bilbao	(Spain) José Ángel Ziganda	Mutual consent	30 June 2018	Pre-season	(Argentina) Eduardo Berizzo	31 May 2018
Huesca	(Argentina) Leo Franco	Sacked	9 October 2018	20th	(Spain) Francisco	10 October 2018
Real Madrid	(Spain) Julen Lopetegui	Sacked	29 October 2018	9th	(Argentina) Santiago Solari	30 October 2018
Celta Vigo	(Argentina) Antonio Mohamed	Sacked	12 November 2018	14th	(Portugal) Miguel Cardoso	12 November 2018
Athletic Bilbao	(Argentina) Eduardo Berizzo	Sacked	4 December 2018	18th	(Spain) Gaizka Garitano	4 December 2018
Villarreal	(Spain) Javier Calleja	Sacked	10 December 2018	17th	(Spain) Luis García	10 December 2018
Real Sociedad	(Spain) Asier Garitano	Sacked	26 December 2018	15th	(Spain) Imanol Alguacil	26 December 2018
Villarreal	(Spain) Luis García	Sacked	29 January 2019	19th	(Spain) Javier Calleja	29 January 2019
Celta Vigo	(Portugal) Miguel Cardoso	Sacked	3 March 2019	17th	(Spain) Fran Escribá	3 March 2019
Real Madrid	(Argentina) Santiago Solari	Sacked	11 March 2019	3rd	(France) Zinedine Zidane	11 March 2019
Sevilla	(Spain) Pablo Machín	Sacked	15 March 2019	6th	(Spain) Joaquín Caparrós	15 March 2019
Rayo Vallecano	(Spain) Míchel	Sacked	18 March 2019	19th	(Spain) Paco Jémez	20 March 2019

== League table ==
=== Standings ===
Pos	Team	Pld	W	D	L	GF	GA	GD	Pts	Qualification or relegation
1	Barcelona (C)	38	26	9	3	90	36	+54	87	Qualification for the Champions League group stage
2	Atlético Madrid	38	22	10	6	55	29	+26	76	Qualification for the Champions League group stage
3	Real Madrid	38	21	5	12	63	46	+17	68	Qualification for the Champions League group stage
4	Valencia	38	15	16	7	51	35	+16	61	Qualification for the Champions League group stage
5	Getafe	38	15	14	9	48	35	+13	59 (Note: Getafe finished ahead of Sevilla on head-to-head points: Sevilla 0–2 Getafe, Getafe 3–0 Sevilla.)	Qualification for the Europa League group stage (Note: Since the winners of the 2018–19 Copa del Rey, Valencia, qualified for European competition based on league position, the spot awarded to the cup winners (Europa League group stage) was passed to the sixth-placed team and the spot awarded to the sixth-placed team (Europa League second qualifying round) was passed to the seventh-placed team.)
6	Sevilla	38	17	8	13	62	47	+15	59	Qualification for the Europa League group stage
7	Espanyol	38	14	11	13	48	50	−2	53 (Note: Espanyol finished ahead of Athletic Bilbao on head-to-head points: Espanyol 1–0 Athletic Bilbao, Athletic Bilbao 1–1 Espanyol.)	Qualification for the Europa League second qualifying round
8	Athletic Bilbao	38	13	14	11	41	45	−4	53	
9	Real Sociedad	38	13	11	14	45	46	−1	50 (Note: Real Sociedad finished ahead of Real Betis and Alavés on head-to-head points: Real Sociedad 6, Real Betis 5, Alavés 5. Real Betis finished ahead of Alavés on goal difference: Real Betis –8, Alavés –11.)	
10	Real Betis	38	14	8	16	44	52	−8	50	
11	Alavés	38	13	11	14	39	50	−11	50	
12	Eibar	38	11	14	13	46	50	−4	47	
13	Leganés	38	11	12	15	37	43	−6	45	
14	Villarreal	38	10	14	14	49	52	−3	44 (Note: Villarreal finished ahead of Levante on head-to-head points: Villarreal 1–1 Levante, Levante 0–2 Villarreal.)	
15	Levante	38	11	11	16	59	66	−7	44	
16	Valladolid	38	10	11	17	32	51	−19	41 (Note: Valladolid finished ahead of Celta Vigo on head-to-head points: Celta Vigo 3–3 Valladolid, Valladolid 2–1 Celta Vigo.)	
17	Celta Vigo	38	10	11	17	53	62	−9	41	
18	Girona (R)	38	9	10	19	37	53	−16	37	Relegation to Segunda División
19	Huesca (R)	38	7	12	19	43	65	−22	33	Relegation to Segunda División
20	Rayo Vallecano (R)	38	8	8	22	41	70	−29	32	Relegation to Segunda División

Source: La Liga, Soccerway
Rules for classification: 1) Points; 2) Head-to-head points; 3) Head-to-head goal difference; 4) Goal difference; 5) Goals scored; 6) Fair-play points (Note: Head-to-head record is used only after all the matches between the teams in question have been played)
(C) Champions; (R) Relegated

=== Results ===
Home \ Away	ALA	ATH	ATM	BAR	CEL	EIB	ESP	GET	GIR	HUE	LEG	LEV	RAY	BET	RMA	RSO	SEV	VAL	VLD	VIL
Alavés	—	0–0	0–4	0–2	0–0	1–1	2–1	1–1	2–1	2–1	1–1	2–0	0–1	0–0	1–0	0–1	1–1	2–1	2–2	2–1
Athletic Bilbao	1–1	—	2–0	0–0	3–1	1–0	1–1	1–1	1–0	2–2	2–1	3–2	3–2	1–0	1–1	1–3	2–0	0–0	1–1	0–3
Atlético Madrid	3–0	3–2	—	1–1	2–0	1–1	1–0	2–0	2–0	3–0	1–0	1–0	1–0	1–0	1–3	2–0	1–1	3–2	1–0	2–0
Barcelona	3–0	1–1	2–0	—	2–0	3–0	2–0	2–0	2–2	8–2	3–1	1–0	3–1	3–4	5–1	2–1	4–2	2–2	1–0	2–0
Celta Vigo	0–1	1–2	2–0	2–0	—	4–0	1–1	1–1	2–1	2–0	0–0	1–4	2–2	0–1	2–4	3–1	1–0	1–2	3–3	3–2
Eibar	2–1	1–1	0–1	2–2	1–0	—	3–0	2–2	3–0	1–2	1–0	4–4	2–1	1–0	3–0	2–1	1–3	1–1	1–2	0–0
Espanyol	2–1	1–0	3–0	0–4	1–1	1–0	—	1–1	1–3	1–1	1–0	1–0	2–1	1–3	2–4	2–0	0–1	2–0	3–1	3–1
Getafe	4–0	1–0	0–2	1–2	3–1	2–0	3–0	—	2–0	2–1	0–2	0–1	2–1	2–0	0–0	1–0	3–0	0–1	0–0	2–2
Girona	1–1	1–2	1–1	0–2	3–2	2–3	1–2	1–1	—	0–2	0–0	1–2	2–1	0–1	1–4	0–0	1–0	2–3	0–0	0–1
Huesca	1–3	0–1	0–3	0–0	3–3	2–0	0–2	1–1	1–1	—	2–1	2–2	0–1	2–1	0–1	0–1	2–1	2–6	4–0	2–2
Leganés	1–0	0–1	1–1	2–1	0–0	2–2	0–2	1–1	0–2	1–0	—	1–0	1–0	3–0	1–1	2–2	1–1	1–1	1–0	0–1
Levante	2–1	3–0	2–2	0–5	1–2	2–2	2–2	0–0	2–2	2–2	2–0	—	4–1	4–0	1–2	1–3	2–6	2–2	2–0	0–2
Rayo Vallecano	1–5	1–1	0–1	2–3	4–2	1–0	2–2	1–2	0–2	0–0	1–2	2–1	—	1–1	1–0	2–2	1–4	2–0	1–2	2–2
Real Betis	1–1	2–2	1–0	1–4	3–3	1–1	1–1	1–2	3–2	2–1	1–0	0–3	2–0	—	1–2	1–0	1–0	1–2	0–1	2–1
Real Madrid	3–0	3–0	0–0	0–1	2–0	2–1	1–0	2–0	1–2	3–2	4–1	1–2	1–0	0–2	—	0–2	2–0	2–0	2–0	3–2
Real Sociedad	0–1	2–1	0–2	1–2	2–1	1–1	3–2	2–1	0–0	0–0	3–0	1–1	2–2	2–1	3–1	—	0–0	0–1	1–2	0–1
Sevilla	2–0	2–0	1–1	2–4	2–1	2–2	2–1	0–2	2–0	2–1	0–3	5–0	5–0	3–2	3–0	5–2	—	0–1	1–0	0–0
Valencia	3–1	2–0	1–1	1–1	1–1	0–1	0–0	0–0	0–1	2–1	1–1	3–1	3–0	0–0	2–1	0–0	1–1	—	1–1	3–0
Valladolid	0–1	1–0	2–3	0–1	2–1	0–0	1–1	2–2	1–0	1–0	2–4	2–1	0–1	0–2	1–4	1–1	0–2	0–2	—	0–0
Villarreal	1–2	1–1	1–1	4–4	2–3	1–0	2–2	1–2	0–1	1–1	2–1	1–1	3–1	2–1	2–2	1–2	3–0	0–0	0–1	—

Source: La Liga
Legend: Blue = home team win; Yellow = draw; Red = away team win.

== Season statistics ==
=== Scoring ===
- First goal of the season:
  (Spain) Roger Martí for Levante against Real Betis (17 August 2018)
- Last goal of the season:
  (Argentina) Pablo de Blasis for Eibar against Barcelona (19 May 2019)

=== Top goalscorers ===
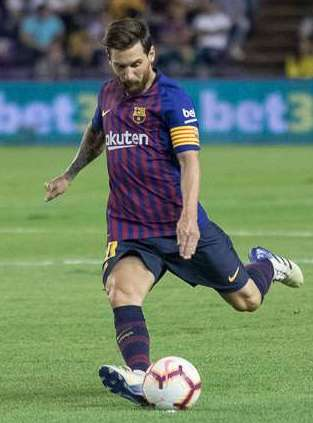
Lionel Messi equalled Telmo Zarra's record for most Pichichi Trophy wins, with a third consecutive award and sixth award overall.

Rank	Player	Club	Goals
1	(Argentina) Lionel Messi	Barcelona	36
2	(France) Karim Benzema	Real Madrid	21
2	(Uruguay) Luis Suárez	Barcelona	21
4	(Spain) Iago Aspas	Celta Vigo	20
5	(Uruguay) Cristhian Stuani	Girona	19
6	(France) Wissam Ben Yedder	Sevilla	18
7	(Spain) Borja Iglesias	Espanyol	17
8	(France) Antoine Griezmann	Atlético Madrid	15
9	(Brazil) Charles	Eibar	14
9	(Spain) Raúl de Tomás	Rayo Vallecano	14
9	(Spain) Jaime Mata	Getafe	14
9	(Spain) Jorge Molina	Getafe	14

=== Top assists ===
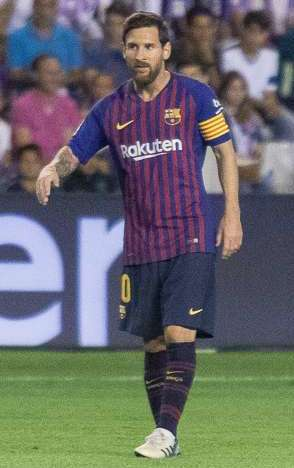
In addition to most goals, Lionel Messi also had the joint-most assists, with 13.

Rank	Player	Club	Assists
1	(Argentina) Lionel Messi	Barcelona	13
1	(Spain) Pablo Sarabia	Sevilla	13
3	(Spain) Santi Cazorla	Villarreal	10
3	(Spain) Jony	Alavés	10
5	(France) Wissam Ben Yedder	Sevilla	9
5	(Spain) José Campaña	Levante	9
5	(France) Antoine Griezmann	Atlético Madrid	9
8	(Spain) Jordi Alba	Barcelona	8
9	(Spain) Moi Gómez	Huesca	7
9	(Spain) Brais Méndez	Celta Vigo	7
9	(Spain) Dani Parejo	Valencia	7
9	(Spain) Sergi Roberto	Barcelona	7
9	(Chile) Arturo Vidal	Barcelona	7

=== Zamora Trophy ===
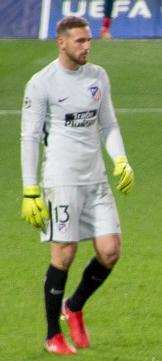
Jan Oblak won his fourth consecutive Zamora Trophy, the first player to do so since Víctor Valdés from 2009 to 2012.

The Ricardo Zamora Trophy was awarded by newspaper Marca to the goalkeeper with the lowest ratio of goals conceded to matches played. A goalkeeper had to play at least 28 matches of 60 or more minutes to be eligible for the trophy.

Rank	Player	Club	Goals against	Matches	Average
1	(Slovenia) Jan Oblak	Atlético Madrid	27	37	0.73
2	(Germany) Marc-André ter Stegen	Barcelona	32	35	0.91
3	(Spain) David Soria	Getafe	34	37	0.92
4	(Brazil) Neto	Valencia	34	34	1
5	(Spain) Iago Herrerín	Athletic Bilbao	32	31	1.03

=== Hat-tricks ===
Player	For	Against	Result	Date	Round
(Portugal) André Silva	Sevilla	Rayo Vallecano	4–1 (A)	19 August 2018	1
(France) Wissam Ben Yedder	Sevilla	Levante	6–2 (A)	23 September 2018	5
(Spain) Iago Aspas	Celta Vigo	Eibar	4–0 (H)	27 October 2018	10
(Uruguay) Luis Suárez	Barcelona	Real Madrid	5–1 (H)	28 October 2018	10
(Argentina) Lionel Messi	Barcelona	Levante	5–0 (A)	16 December 2018	16
(Spain) Raúl de Tomás	Rayo Vallecano	Celta Vigo	4–2 (H)	11 January 2019	19
(Morocco) Youssef En-Nesyri	Leganés	Real Betis	3–0 (H)	10 February 2019	23
(Argentina) Lionel Messi	Barcelona	Sevilla	4–2 (A)	23 February 2019	25
(France) Wissam Ben Yedder	Sevilla	Real Sociedad	5–2 (H)	10 March 2019	27
(Argentina) Lionel Messi	Barcelona	Real Betis	4–1 (A)	17 March 2019	28
(France) Karim Benzema	Real Madrid	Athletic Bilbao	3–0 (H)	21 April 2019	33

Note

(H) – Home; (A) – Away

=== Discipline ===
==== Player ====
- Most yellow cards: 17
  - (Spain) Álvaro (Villarreal)
  - (Argentina) Éver Banega (Sevilla)
  - (Spain) Mario Gaspar (Villarreal)
- Most red cards: 2
  - (Peru) Luis Advíncula (Rayo Vallecano)
  - (Spain) Álvaro (Villarreal)
  - (Senegal) Abdoulaye Ba (Rayo Vallecano)
  - (Argentina) Éver Banega (Sevilla)
  - (Uruguay) Erick Cabaco (Levante)
  - (Argentina) Gustavo Cabral (Celta Vigo)
  - (Togo) Djené Dakonam (Getafe)
  - (Spain) Óscar de Marcos (Athletic Bilbao)
  - (Colombia) Bernardo Espinosa (Girona)
  - (Spain) Jorge Pulido (Huesca)
  - (Spain) Rubén Rochina (Levante)

==== Team ====
- Most yellow cards: 121
  - Athletic Bilbao
- Most red cards: 8
  - Rayo Vallecano
- Fewest yellow cards: 77
  - Barcelona
- Fewest red cards: 0
  - Valladolid

== Average attendances ==
Pos	Team	Total	High	Low	Average	Change
1	Barcelona	1,428,956	91,077	50,670	75,208	+8.4%
2	Real Madrid	1,151,359	78,819	46,294	60,598	−7.7%
3	Atlético Madrid	1,065,049	67,804	40,863	56,055	+1.0%
4	Real Betis	838,425	53,443	28,078	44,128	−4.9%
5	Athletic Bilbao	775,197	47,629	34,060	40,800	+9.2%
6	Valencia	751,756	46,280	35,518	39,566	+2.3%
7	Sevilla	685,995	42,877	28,134	36,105	+9.2%
8	Real Sociedad	422,932	27,322	16,417	22,260	+13.0%
9	Levante	373,673	23,736	16,198	19,667	+11.2%
10	Espanyol	362,219	25,700	13,469	19,064	+8.0%
11	Valladolid	358,112	22,585	16,136	18,848	+61.2%^{1}
12	Celta Vigo	336,390	22,564	13,266	17,705	+8.6%
13	Villarreal	316,531	19,903	13,685	16,660	−0.2%
14	Alavés	279,371	19,349	10,394	14,704	−5.7%
15	Rayo Vallecano	224,998	13,691	10,040	11,842	+26.1%^{1}
16	Getafe	205,088	14,721	7,600	10,836	+5.9%
17	Girona	205,047	13,649	6,482	10,792	+5.4%
18	Leganés	190,325	11,638	4,155	10,017	+7.3%
19	Huesca	125,660	7,343	5,630	6,614	+57.9%^{1}
20	Eibar	92,675	6,519	3,652	4,878	−8.4%
	League total	10,190,558	91,077	3,652	26,817	−0.6%

Source: World Football
Notes:
1: Team played last season in Segunda División.

== Awards ==
=== Seasonal ===
Award	Recipient
Best Player	(Argentina) Lionel Messi (Barcelona)
Best Goalkeeper	(Slovenia) Jan Oblak (Atlético Madrid)
Best Coach	(Spain) José Bordalás (Getafe)

==== Team of the Year ====

Team of the Year
Goalkeeper	(Slovenia) Jan Oblak (Atlético Madrid)			
Defenders	(Spain) Jesús Navas (Sevilla)	(Spain) Gerard Piqué (Barcelona)	(Togo) Djené (Getafe)	(Spain) Jordi Alba (Barcelona)
Midfielders	(Croatia) Ivan Rakitić (Barcelona)	(Spain) Dani Parejo (Valencia)	(Spain) Sergio Canales (Real Betis)	(Spain) Pablo Sarabia (Sevilla)
Forwards	(Argentina) Lionel Messi (Barcelona)		(Spain) Iago Aspas (Celta Vigo)	

==== EA Sports ====
Pos.	Player	Club	Ref.
GK	(Slovenia) Jan Oblak	Atlético Madrid	
DF	(Spain) Jesús Navas	Sevilla	
DF	(Spain) Gerard Piqué	Barcelona	
DF	(Togo) Djené	Getafe	
DF	(Spain) Jordi Alba	Barcelona	
MF	(Spain) Pablo Sarabia	Sevilla	
MF	(Spain) Dani Parejo	Valencia	
MF	(Spain) Sergio Canales	Real Betis	
FW	(Argentina) Lionel Messi	Barcelona	
FW	(Uruguay) Luis Suárez	Barcelona	
FW	(France) Karim Benzema	Real Madrid	

=== Monthly ===
Month	Player of the Month		Reference
Month	Player	Club	Reference
September	(Argentina) Lionel Messi	Barcelona	
October	(Uruguay) Luis Suárez	Barcelona	
November	(Czech Republic) Tomáš Vaclík	Sevilla	
December	(France) Antoine Griezmann	Atlético Madrid	
January	(Spain) Iñaki Williams	Athletic Bilbao	
February	(Spain) Jaime Mata	Getafe	
March	(Argentina) Lionel Messi	Barcelona	
April	(Spain) Iago Aspas	Celta Vigo	
