= 2022–23 Segunda División =

92nd season of the second-tier football league in Spain

Segunda División
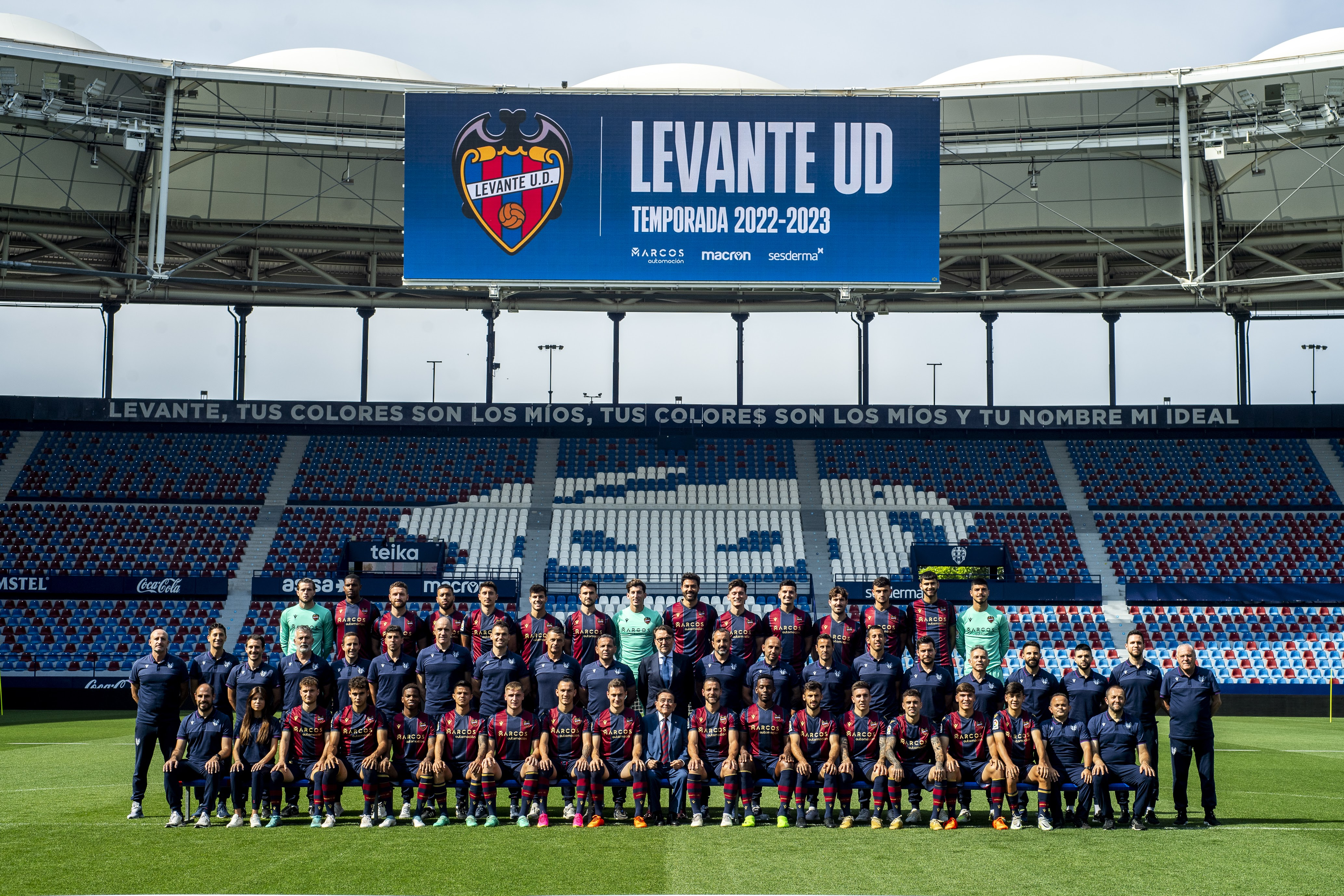
- Levante UD got relegated to Segunda División for the first time since 2017.
- Season: 2022–23
- Dates: 12 August 2022 – 17 June 2023
- Champions: Granada; 4th title
- Promoted: Granada; Las Palmas; Alavés
- Relegated: Ponferradina; Málaga; Ibiza; Lugo
- Matches: 462
- Goals: 932 (2.02 per match)
- Top goalscorer: Myrto Uzuni (23 goals)
- Biggest home win: Granada 5–0 Sporting Gijón (13 October 2022)
- Biggest away win: Ibiza 0–5 Albacete (7 May 2023)
- Highest scoring: Sporting Gijón 3–4 Mirandés (12 March 2023); Villarreal B 5–2 Cartagena (19 March 2023); Andorra 4–3 Villarreal B (27 May 2023)

The 2022–23 Segunda División (known as LaLiga SmartBank for sponsorship reasons) football season, was the 92nd since its establishment in Spain.

== Teams ==
=== Team changes ===
Promoted from 2021–22 Primera División RFEF	Relegated from 2021–22 La Liga	Promoted to 2022–23 La Liga	Relegated to 2022–23 Primera Federación
Racing Santander; Andorra; Albacete; Villarreal B	Alavés; Granada; Levante	Almería; Valladolid; Girona	Alcorcón; Fuenlabrada; Amorebieta; Real Sociedad B

=== Promotion and relegation (pre-season) ===
A total of 22 teams contested the league, including 15 sides from the 2021–22 season, three relegated from the 2021–22 La Liga, and four promoted from the 2021–22 Primera División RFEF.

Teams promoted to La Liga

The first two teams to earn promotion from the Segunda División were Almería and Valladolid, who mathematically secured first and second position, respectively, on the very last match day of the season. Almería returned to La Liga after a seven-year absence, while Valladolid returned after a one-year absence. The third and final team to be promoted were Girona after winning the play-off final 3–1 against Tenerife, returning after a three-year absence.

Teams relegated from La Liga

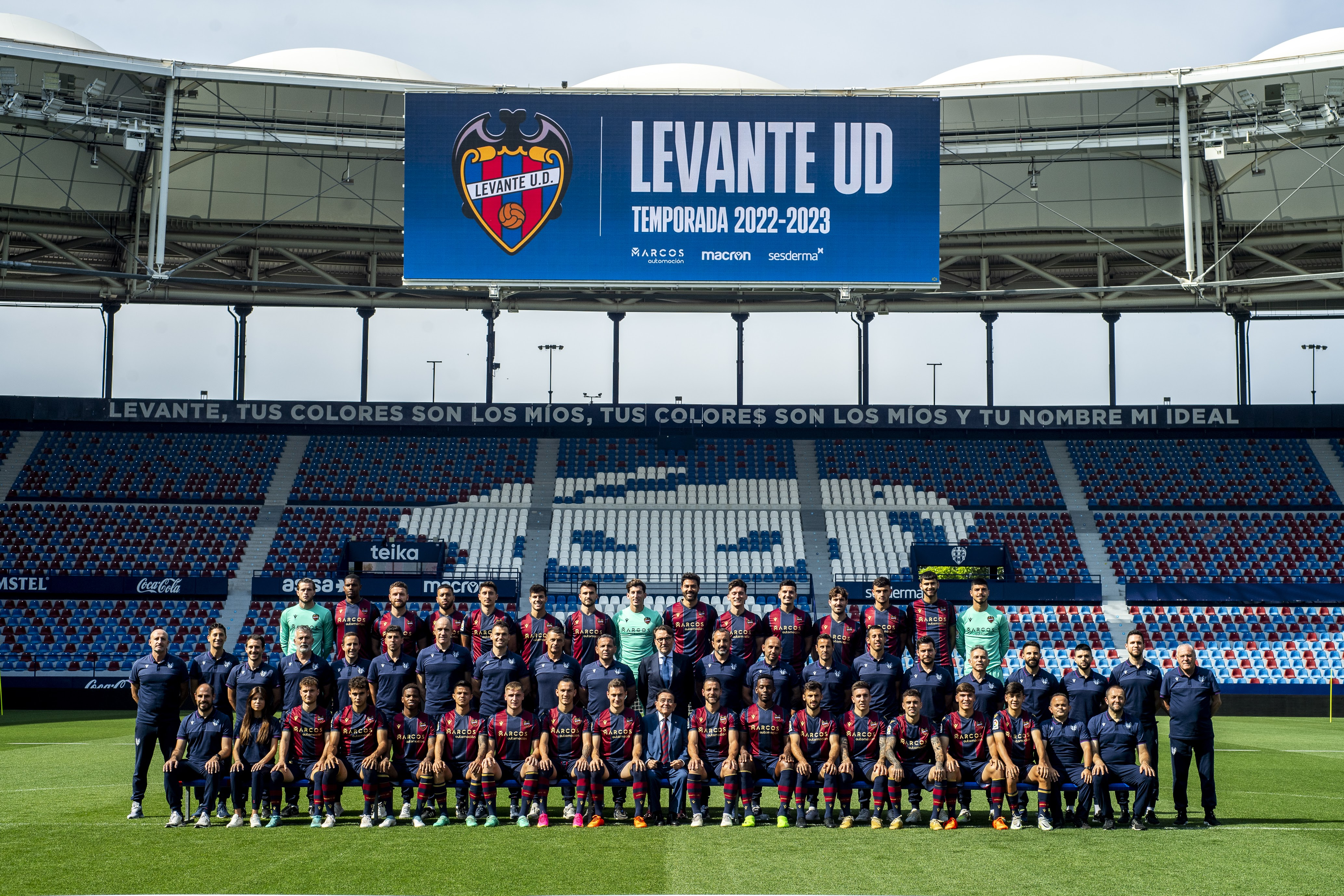
Levante returned to Segunda Division after being relegated.

The first team to be relegated from La Liga was Levante, following a 0–6 loss to Real Madrid on 12 May 2022, ending a five-year stint in the top tier. The second team to be relegated was Alavés, after losing 1–3 to Levante on 15 May 2022, ending a six-year stay in the top tier. The third and final team relegated was Granada on 22 May 2022, whose draw against Espanyol on the final match day, paired with wins for Cádiz and Mallorca, the final match day, confirmed an end to their three-year stay in the top level.

Teams relegated to Primera División RFEF

On 16 April 2022, Alcorcón became the first team to be relegated from the Segunda División after defeated by Cartagena, ending their twelve-year stay in the second division. The second team to be relegated was Fuenlabrada, who were relegated on 7 May 2022 after being a loss to Real Sociedad B, ending their three-year spell in the second division. The final two sides to be relegated were Real Sociedad B and Amorebieta, both on 21 May 2022; this marked an immediate return to the third tier for the sides after a single season in Segunda División.

Teams promoted from Primera División RFEF

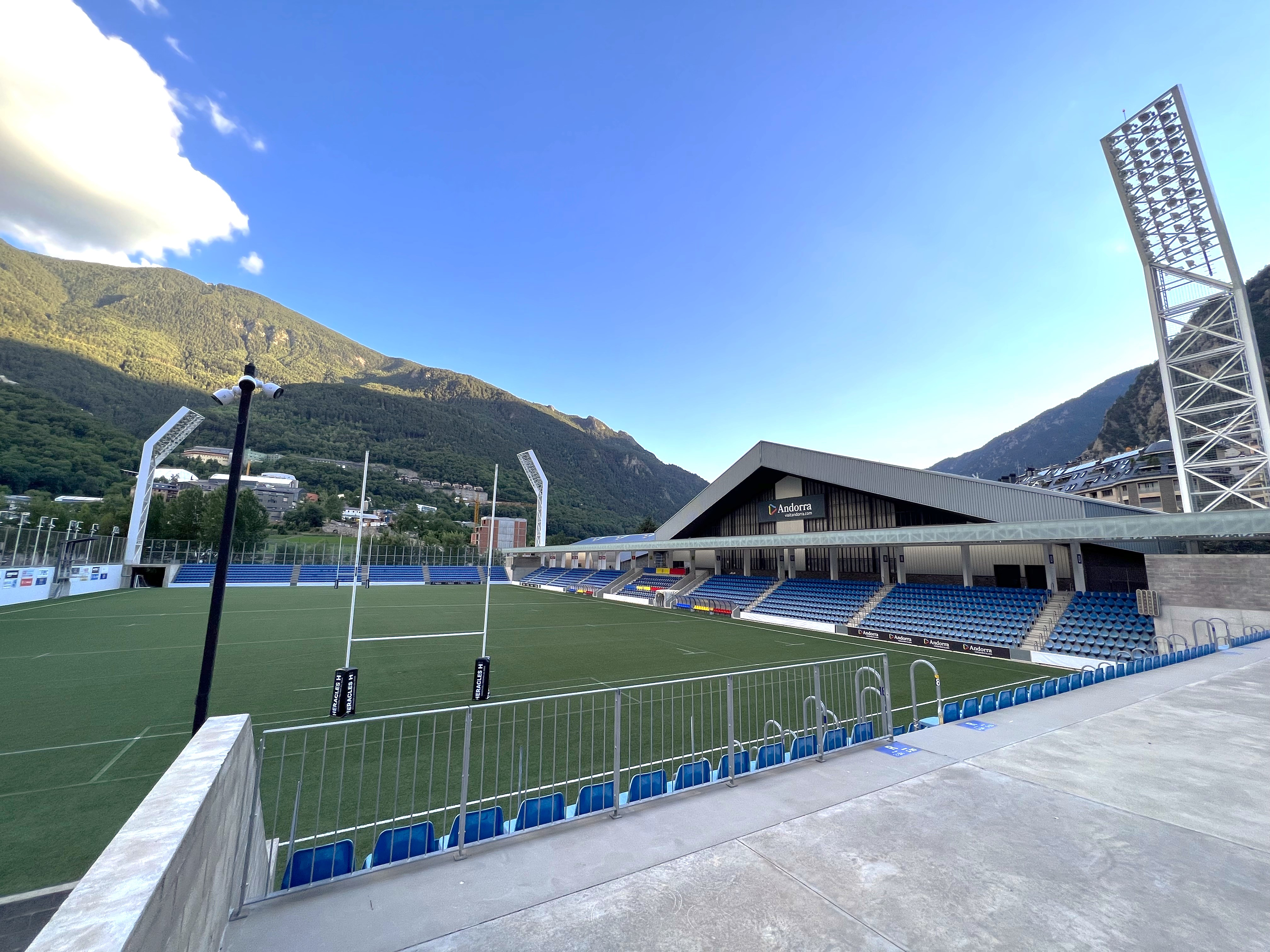
Estadi Nacional d‘Andorra became a stadium in the category for the first time.

On 1 May 2022, Racing Santander became the first team to achieve promotion to the second tier after a 2–2 draw against Celta Vigo B, securing direct promotion and ending a two-season stint at the third tier of Spanish football. The second team to earn promotion was Andorra following a win against UCAM Murcia on 21 May 2022, entering the second tier for the first time in club history. On 11 June 2022, Albacete and Villarreal B were both promoted, after defeating Deportivo La Coruña and Gimnàstic, respectively, in the final of the promotion play-offs. Albacete returned to the Segunda División after a one-year absence, and Villarreal B returned after ten years in the third tier.

=== Stadiums and locations ===
Location of teams in 2022–23 Segunda División
Location of teams in 2022–23 Segunda División (Canary Islands)

Team	Location	Stadium	Capacity
Alavés	Vitoria-Gasteiz	Mendizorrotza	19,840
Albacete	Albacete	Carlos Belmonte	17,524
Andorra (Note: Andorra is an Andorran club playing in the Spanish football league system.)	Andorra la Vella	Estadi Nacional	3,306
Burgos	Burgos	El Plantío	12,194
Cartagena	Cartagena	Cartagonova	15,105
Eibar	Eibar	Ipurua	8,164
Granada	Granada	Nuevo Los Cármenes	19,336
Huesca	Huesca	El Alcoraz	9,100
Ibiza	Ibiza	Can Misses	6,000
Las Palmas	Las Palmas de Gran Canaria	Gran Canaria	31,250
Leganés	Leganés	Butarque	12,450
Levante	Valencia	Ciutat de València	26,354
Lugo	Lugo	Anxo Carro	7,070
Málaga	Málaga	La Rosaleda	30,044
Mirandés	Miranda de Ebro	Anduva	5,759
Oviedo	Oviedo	Carlos Tartiere	30,500
Ponferradina	Ponferrada	El Toralín	8,400
Racing Santander	Santander	El Sardinero	22,222
Sporting Gijón	Gijón	El Molinón	29,371
Tenerife	Santa Cruz de Tenerife	Heliodoro Rodríguez López	22,824
Villarreal B	Villarreal	Ciudad Deportiva Villarreal CF; Estadio de la Ceramica	5,000; 23,000
Zaragoza	Zaragoza	La Romareda	33,608

=== Personnel and sponsorship ===
Team	Manager	Captain	Kit manufacturer	Shirt main sponsor
Alavés	(Spain) Luis García	(Spain) Víctor Laguardia	Puma	LEA
Albacete	(Spain) Rubén Albés	(Spain) Bernabé Barragán	Adidas	Iner Energía
Andorra	(Spain) Eder Sarabia	(Spain) Rubén Bover	Nike	Mora Banc
Burgos	(Spain) Julián Calero	(Spain) Unai Elgezabal	Adidas	Reale Seguros
Cartagena	(Spain) Luis Carrión	(Spain) Marc Martínez	Adidas	Talasur Group
Eibar	(Spain) Gaizka Garitano	(Spain) Anaitz Arbilla	Joma	eibho
Granada	(Spain) Paco López	(Spain) Víctor Díaz	Adidas	None
Huesca	(Spain) José Ángel Ziganda	(Spain) Jorge Pulido	Nike	Huesca La Magia
Ibiza	(Spain) Lucas Alcaraz	(Spain) Fran Grima	Puma	Power Electronics
Las Palmas	(Spain) García Pimienta	(Spain) Jonathan Viera	Hummel	Gran Canaria
Leganés	(Spain) Carlos Martínez (interim)	(Nigeria) Kenneth Omeruo	Joma	Rainbow Sports
Levante	(Spain) Javier Calleja	(Spain) Sergio Postigo	Macron	Marcos Automoción
Lugo	(Spain) Iñigo Vélez	(Spain) Manu Barreiro	Kappa	Estrella Galicia 0,0
Málaga	(Spain) Sergio Pellicer	(Spain) Alberto Escassi	Hummel	Sabor a Málaga
Mirandés	(Spain) Joseba Etxeberria	(Spain) Ramón Juan	Adidas	Miranda Empresas
Oviedo	(Spain) Álvaro Cervera	(Spain) Borja Bastón	Adidas	Digi Communications
Ponferradina	(Spain) Juanfran	(Brazil) Yuri	Adidas	TVITEC
Racing Santander	(Spain) José Alberto	(Spain) Íñigo Sainz-Maza	Austral	Plenitude
Sporting Gijón	(Spain) Miguel Ángel Ramírez	(Spain) Iván Cuéllar	Puma	Integra Energía, Biow, Jalisco es México Nissan
Tenerife	(Spain) Luis Miguel Ramis	(Spain) Aitor Sanz	Hummel	Turismo Tenerife
Villarreal B	(Spain) Miguel Álvarez	(Spain) Adrián de la Fuente	Joma	Pamesa Cerámica
Zaragoza	(Spain) Fran Escribá	(Spain) Alberto Zapater	Adidas	Caravan Fragancias

=== Managerial changes ===
Team	Outgoing manager	Manner of departure	Date of vacancy	Position in table	Incoming manager	Date of appointment
Alavés	(Spain) Julio Velázquez	End of contract	23 May 2022	Pre-season	(Spain) Luis García Plaza	23 May 2022
Lugo	(Spain) Rubén Albés	End of contract	23 May 2022	Pre-season	(Spain) Hernán Pérez	16 June 2022
Ponferradina	(Spain) Jon Pérez Bolo	End of contract	27 May 2022	Pre-season	(Portugal) José Gomes	13 June 2022
Zaragoza	(Spain) Juan Ignacio Martínez	End of contract	30 May 2022	Pre-season	(Spain) Juan Carlos Carcedo	31 May 2022
Ibiza	(Spain) Paco Jémez	End of contract	31 May 2022	Pre-season	(Spain) Javier Baraja	8 June 2022
Leganés	(Tunisia) Mehdi Nafti	End of contract	5 June 2022	Pre-season	(Spain) Imanol Idiakez	6 June 2022
Oviedo	(Spain) José Ángel Ziganda	End of contract	8 June 2022	Pre-season	(Spain) Jon Pérez Bolo	15 June 2022
Levante	(Italy) Alessio Lisci	End of contract	12 June 2022	Pre-season	(Tunisia) Mehdi Nafti	12 June 2022
Huesca	(Spain) Xisco Muñoz	End of contract	13 June 2022	Pre-season	(Spain) José Ángel Ziganda	13 June 2022
Albacete	(Spain) Rubén de la Barrera	Mutual agreement	15 June 2022	Pre-season	(Spain) Rubén Albés	27 June 2022
Málaga	(Argentina) Pablo Guede	Sacked	20 September 2022	21st	(Spain) Pepe Mel	21 September 2022
Levante	(Tunisia) Mehdi Nafti	Sacked	10 October 2022	14th	(Spain) Felipe Miñambres (caretaker)	10 October 2022
Oviedo	(Spain) Jon Pérez Bolo	Sacked	16 October 2022	19th	(Spain) Álvaro Cervera	16 October 2022
Levante	(Spain) Felipe Miñambres	End of caretaker spell	16 October 2022	9th	(Spain) Javier Calleja	16 October 2022
Ibiza	(Spain) Javier Baraja	Sacked	22 October 2022	17th	(Spain) Juan Antonio Anquela	24 October 2022
Zaragoza	(Spain) Juan Carlos Carcedo	Sacked	6 November 2022	17th	(Spain) Fran Escribá	7 November 2022
Granada	(Spain) Aitor Karanka	Sacked	8 November 2022	8th	(Spain) Paco López	9 November 2022
Ponferradina	(Portugal) José Manuel Gomes	Resigned	19 November 2022	18th	(Spain) David Gallego	20 November 2022
Lugo	(Spain) Hernán Pérez	Sacked	21 November 2022	20th	(Spain) Fran Justo	23 November 2022
Ibiza	(Spain) Juan Antonio Anquela	Sacked	23 November 2022	21st	(Spain) Carlos Sánchez (caretaker)	26 November 2022
Ibiza	(Spain) Carlos Sánchez	End of caretaker spell	28 November 2022	22nd	(Spain) Lucas Alcaraz	28 November 2022
Racing Santander	(Spain) Guillermo Fernández Romo	Sacked	12 December 2022	19th	(Spain) José Alberto Lopez	13 December 2022
Sporting Gijón	(Spain) Abelardo	Sacked	15 January 2023	15th	(Spain) Miguel Ángel Ramírez	17 January 2023
Málaga	(Spain) Pepe Mel	Sacked	25 January 2023	20th	(Spain) Sergio Pellicer	25 January 2023
Lugo	(Spain) Fran Justo	Sacked	31 January 2023	21st	(Spain) Joan Carrillo	1 February 2023
Lugo	(Spain) Joan Carrillo	Sacked	6 March 2023	22nd	(Spain) Iñigo Vélez	7 March 2023
Leganés	(Spain) Imanol Idiakez	Sacked	4 April 2023	17th	(Spain) Carlos Martínez (interim)	4 April 2023
Ponferradina	(Spain) David Gallego	Sacked	10 April 2023	19th	(Spain) Juanfran	10 April 2023

== League table ==
=== Standings ===
Pos	Team	Pld	W	D	L	GF	GA	GD	Pts	Qualification or relegation
1	Granada (C, P)	42	22	9	11	55	30	+25	75	Promotion to La Liga
2	Las Palmas (P)	42	18	18	6	49	29	+20	72 (Note: Overall goal difference: Las Palmas +20, Levante +16.)	Promotion to La Liga
3	Levante	42	18	18	6	46	30	+16	72	Qualification for promotion play-offs
4	Alavés (O, P)	42	19	14	9	47	33	+14	71 (Note: Alavés finished ahead of Eibar on head-to-head points: Eibar 0–0 Alavés, Alavés 2–0 Eibar.)	Qualification for promotion play-offs
5	Eibar	42	19	14	9	45	36	+9	71	Qualification for promotion play-offs
6	Albacete	42	17	16	9	58	47	+11	67	Qualification for promotion play-offs
7	Andorra	42	16	11	15	47	37	+10	59 (Note: Andorra finished ahead of Oviedo on head-to-head points: Oviedo 0–1 Andorra, Andorra 3–1 Oviedo.)	
8	Oviedo	42	16	11	15	34	35	−1	59	
9	Cartagena	42	16	10	16	47	49	−2	58	
10	Tenerife	42	14	15	13	42	37	+5	57	
11	Burgos	42	13	15	14	33	35	−2	54 (Note: Burgos finished ahead of Racing Santander on head-to-head points: Racing Santander 0–1 Burgos, Burgos 2–1 Racing Santander.)	
12	Racing Santander	42	14	12	16	39	40	−1	54	
13	Zaragoza	42	12	17	13	40	39	+1	53 (Note: Zaragoza finished ahead of Leganés on head-to-head goal difference: Leganés 2–1 Zaragoza, Zaragoza 3–0 Leganés.)	
14	Leganés	42	14	11	17	37	42	−5	53	
15	Huesca	42	11	19	12	36	36	0	52 (Note: Huesca finished ahead of Mirandés on head-to-head points: Mirandés 1–1 Huesca, Huesca 1–0 Mirandés.)	
16	Mirandés	42	13	13	16	48	54	−6	52	
17	Sporting Gijón	42	11	17	14	43	48	−5	50 (Note: Overall goal difference: Sporting Gijón −5, Villarreal B −6.)	
18	Villarreal B	42	13	11	18	49	55	−6	50	Not eligible for promotion
19	Ponferradina (R)	42	9	17	16	40	53	−13	44 (Note: Ponferradina finished ahead of Málaga on head-to-head goal difference: Málaga 1–0 Ponferradina, Ponferradina 2–0 Málaga.)	Relegation to Primera Federación
20	Málaga (R)	42	10	14	18	37	44	−7	44	Relegation to Primera Federación
21	Ibiza (R)	42	7	13	22	33	66	−33	34	Relegation to Primera Federación
22	Lugo (R)	42	6	13	23	27	57	−30	31	Relegation to Primera Federación

Source: LaLiga SmartBank
Rules for classification: 1) points; 2) head-to-head points; 3) head-to-head goal difference; 4) goal difference; 5) number of goals scored
(C) Champions; (O) Play-off winners; (P) Promoted; (R) Relegated
Notes:

Notes

1. Reserve teams are not eligible for promotion to the same league as the first team.

=== Results ===
Home \ Away	ALA	ALB	AND	BUR	CAR	EIB	GRA	HUE	IBI	LPA	LEG	LEV	LUG	MGA	MIR	OVI	PON	RAC	SPO	TFE	VIL	ZAR
Alavés	—	0–0	0–0	1–0	0–0	2–0	1–1	2–1	4–2	1–1	2–1	0–2	0–0	2–1	1–0	2–1	3–1	3–0	0–0	1–0	2–0	1–0
Albacete	1–1	—	1–1	0–0	1–1	3–1	1–2	2–1	4–0	1–2	1–0	2–3	2–0	3–2	2–1	1–0	0–1	2–1	2–1	1–1	0–0	0–0
Andorra	0–1	0–1	—	0–1	0–1	2–0	1–0	1–0	2–2	0–0	1–1	3–1	4–0	1–0	0–1	3–1	3–0	0–1	1–0	1–0	4–3	0–1
Burgos	3–0	1–1	2–1	—	1–0	1–2	1–3	1–1	2–0	0–0	0–3	0–0	0–1	1–0	2–1	0–0	2–2	2–1	0–0	0–1	1–0	2–2
Cartagena	1–1	2–1	0–3	0–0	—	2–1	0–0	0–0	2–0	1–4	1–2	1–2	2–0	2–1	1–0	2–1	2–3	0–3	2–1	0–1	0–1	1–0
Eibar	0–0	1–1	0–0	1–0	0–3	—	4–0	2–1	1–0	0–1	0–0	1–1	1–0	2–1	0–0	1–0	1–0	2–1	2–2	2–1	2–0	1–1
Granada	3–1	4–0	2–0	1–0	1–0	1–1	—	0–0	2–0	2–1	2–0	0–0	2–0	1–0	2–1	1–0	2–2	2–0	5–0	2–0	3–0	1–0
Huesca	0–1	1–1	1–0	2–1	2–3	0–1	1–1	—	3–0	1–0	1–0	3–0	1–1	1–0	1–0	1–1	1–1	0–0	0–0	1–1	1–0	1–1
Ibiza	1–1	0–5	0–1	2–0	2–2	1–2	0–2	2–2	—	1–2	0–2	1–2	3–2	1–1	1–1	1–2	1–1	1–0	1–3	1–0	0–0	1–0
Las Palmas	0–0	1–2	2–0	0–2	1–0	1–1	2–0	1–0	0–0	—	1–0	0–0	3–0	2–2	2–1	0–1	2–0	1–1	1–1	3–1	1–1	0–0
Leganés	1–2	1–2	1–1	0–0	1–3	2–1	1–0	2–1	0–1	0–0	—	2–2	1–0	1–0	2–2	0–1	2–1	0–0	1–0	2–1	1–0	2–1
Levante	2–0	0–0	1–0	1–0	0–1	0–0	3–1	0–0	0–0	1–1	2–1	—	3–1	1–0	1–2	2–1	0–0	0–1	1–0	2–0	4–1	1–1
Lugo	1–2	1–2	2–2	2–0	1–1	0–2	1–0	1–2	0–0	0–1	1–0	1–1	—	0–2	0–0	0–0	0–0	1–1	0–1	0–0	1–2	0–0
Málaga	1–0	1–2	0–0	1–1	1–0	0–1	1–1	0–0	1–1	0–4	2–0	0–0	3–2	—	2–0	0–1	1–0	0–1	1–1	1–1	1–1	3–0
Mirandés	1–3	4–2	1–1	2–1	2–1	2–3	1–3	1–1	2–2	3–3	0–0	0–1	2–0	1–3	—	1–0	2–1	1–1	1–1	1–0	2–1	2–0
Oviedo	1–0	1–1	0–1	0–1	1–3	1–1	1–0	0–1	0–1	0–0	1–0	1–1	2–1	1–0	1–0	—	3–2	1–0	1–0	0–0	0–1	2–1
Ponferradina	1–0	1–1	1–4	1–2	0–3	0–1	0–0	1–0	2–1	0–1	0–1	0–0	1–0	2–0	0–0	1–1	—	1–1	1–3	2–2	2–1	1–2
Racing Santander	1–1	4–1	2–1	0–1	3–1	1–0	1–0	1–1	1–0	0–0	2–1	0–1	0–1	0–0	1–2	0–1	1–1	—	2–0	1–1	0–2	1–0
Sporting Gijón	0–0	2–2	4–1	0–0	0–0	2–0	1–0	1–1	2–1	0–1	2–2	1–1	3–1	0–0	3–4	1–1	1–4	0–2	—	1–0	3–1	1–0
Tenerife	2–1	1–0	1–1	2–1	0–0	0–1	2–0	2–0	4–0	4–1	1–0	1–0	1–1	3–1	1–0	0–1	0–0	1–0	1–1	—	1–1	0–2
Villarreal B	1–0	1–2	1–0	0–0	5–2	2–2	0–2	0–0	1–0	0–1	0–0	2–3	3–1	1–2	3–0	2–1	2–2	2–1	2–0	2–2	—	2–3
Zaragoza	1–4	1–1	0–2	0–0	2–0	0–0	1–0	3–0	2–1	1–1	3–0	0–0	1–2	1–1	0–0	1–1	0–0	4–1	1–0	1–1	2–1	—

Source: LaLiga
Legend: Blue = home team win; Yellow = draw; Red = away team win.

=== Positions by round ===
The table lists the positions of teams after each week of matches. In order to preserve chronological evolvements, any postponed matches are not included to the round at which they were originally scheduled, but added to the full round they were played immediately afterwards.

Team ╲ Round	1	2	3	4	5	6	7	8	9	10	11	12	13	14	15	16	17	18	19	20	21	22	23	24	25	26	27	28	29	30	31	32	33	34	35	36	37	38	39	40	41	42
Granada	1	1	1	2	6	3	5	7	9	5	8	4	6	7	8	6	8	7	7	6	6	5	7	7	6	5	4	5	5	4	4	2	2	3	3	2	3	2	3	1	1	1
Las Palmas	12	4	2	3	1	2	1	2	2	1	1	1	1	3	2	3	2	1	1	2	1	2	2	2	1	1	1	1	1	1	2	3	3	2	2	3	4	5	1	2	2	2
Levante	13	13	10	11	5	10	11	12	14	11	10	7	4	6	4	4	4	4	5	3	3	3	3	3	3	2	2	3	2	3	3	4	4	5	5	5	5	3	5	5	4	3
Alavés	4	3	4	5	2	1	2	1	1	2	2	2	2	2	1	1	1	3	3	5	5	4	5	4	4	4	3	2	3	5	5	5	5	4	4	4	2	4	4	3	3	4
Eibar	6	7	3	8	3	5	3	4	6	4	6	8	5	4	5	5	7	6	4	1	2	1	1	1	2	3	5	4	4	2	1	1	1	1	1	1	1	1	2	4	5	5
Albacete	5	8	5	1	4	8	9	5	7	7	5	6	8	8	9	12	9	10	13	8	7	8	6	6	5	6	6	6	6	6	6	6	6	6	7	6	6	6	6	6	6	6
Andorra	7	12	15	14	14	9	10	6	8	10	11	12	11	9	10	8	6	8	8	9	10	9	10	10	11	15	17	13	14	16	13	12	11	10	11	9	8	11	12	9	9	7
Oviedo	20	11	8	10	10	14	14	16	16	18	19	16	18	19	16	16	15	14	14	16	14	15	13	14	15	12	12	14	15	18	18	16	16	16	15	14	10	9	8	8	7	8
Cartagena	15	10	6	12	8	4	4	3	3	6	4	5	7	5	6	7	5	5	6	7	8	10	9	9	9	10	9	8	8	8	8	9	7	7	6	7	7	7	7	7	8	9
Tenerife	18	17	20	16	17	16	15	15	15	14	12	13	14	17	15	14	14	16	15	15	17	17	17	16	13	9	11	10	11	13	14	11	12	12	14	11	13	12	10	11	10	10
Burgos	8	9	11	6	7	6	7	9	5	3	3	3	3	1	3	2	3	2	2	4	4	6	4	5	7	7	7	7	7	7	7	7	8	8	8	8	9	8	9	10	11	11
Racing	22	21	22	22	20	20	21	20	19	15	15	17	16	16	14	15	17	18	18	19	18	19	18	18	18	18	18	18	18	14	16	17	17	18	18	18	18	16	16	15	16	12
Zaragoza	14	14	16	19	16	13	17	17	17	19	14	15	13	14	17	17	16	15	16	14	16	16	14	17	17	14	16	17	17	17	15	15	14	15	13	10	12	13	13	14	14	13
Leganés	16	19	21	17	19	19	20	22	20	17	18	14	15	13	12	13	11	9	12	12	9	7	8	8	8	8	8	9	9	10	12	14	15	17	16	15	15	17	14	13	12	14
Huesca	11	15	17	15	11	15	12	11	10	8	9	10	9	10	7	9	10	11	9	13	11	11	11	12	14	11	10	12	10	9	9	10	10	11	9	12	14	14	17	17	15	15
Mirandés	9	18	19	21	22	22	19	19	21	21	22	22	21	20	20	19	19	17	17	17	15	14	12	15	16	17	15	16	16	12	11	13	13	13	17	16	11	10	11	12	13	16
Sporting	10	5	9	4	9	12	6	8	4	9	7	9	10	11	11	11	12	13	11	11	13	12	15	11	12	16	14	15	13	15	17	18	18	14	12	17	17	15	18	18	17	17
Villarreal B	2	6	13	7	13	7	8	10	11	12	13	11	12	12	13	10	13	12	10	10	12	13	16	13	10	13	13	11	12	11	10	8	9	9	10	13	16	18	15	16	18	18
Ponferradina	3	2	7	13	15	11	13	13	12	13	16	18	19	15	18	18	18	20	20	18	20	18	19	19	19	19	19	19	19	19	19	19	19	19	19	20	20	20	20	20	20	19
Málaga	19	22	14	18	21	21	22	21	22	22	21	21	22	22	22	22	21	21	21	21	21	21	21	20	20	20	20	20	20	20	20	20	20	20	20	19	19	19	19	19	19	20
Ibiza	21	20	18	20	18	18	18	14	13	16	17	20	20	21	21	21	22	22	22	22	22	22	22	22	22	22	22	22	22	21	21	21	21	21	21	21	21	21	21	21	21	21
Lugo	17	16	12	9	12	17	16	18	18	20	20	19	17	18	19	20	20	19	19	20	19	20	20	21	21	21	21	21	21	22	22	22	22	22	22	22	22	22	22	22	22	22

Promotion to La Liga
Qualification to promotion play-offs
Relegation to Primera Federación

Source: BDFútbol

== Promotion play-offs ==
Semi–finals
3	Levante	3	3	6
6	Albacete	1	0	1
4	Alavés	1	2	3
5	Eibar	1	0	1

Final
3	Levante	0	0	0
4	Alavés (a.e.t.)	0	1	1

== Season statistics ==
=== Top goalscorers ===
Rank	Player	Club	Goals
1	(Albania) Myrto Uzuni	Granada	23
2	(Spain) Raúl García	Mirandés	19
3	(Turkey) Sinan Bakış	Andorra	12
3	(Spain) Stoichkov	Eibar	12
5	(Spain) Enric Gallego	Tenerife	11
5	(Spain) Higinio Marín	Albacete	11
7	(Spain) Rubén Castro	Málaga	10
7	(Belgium) Jonathan Dubasin	Albacete	10
7	(Spain) Luis Rioja	Alavés	10
10	Seven players		9

=== Top assists ===
Rank	Player	Club	Assists
1	(Spain) José Callejón	Granada	9
2	(Argentina) Pablo de Blasis	Cartagena	8
2	(Spain) Alberto Moleiro	Las Palmas	8
4	(Spain) Ager Aketxe	Eibar	7
4	(Spain) Manu Fuster	Albacete	7
4	(Spain) Raúl García	Mirandés	7
4	(Spain) Jorge de Frutos	Levante	7
4	(Spain) Iñigo Vicente	Racing Santander	7
9	(Spain) Lucas Ahijado	Oviedo	6
9	(Spain) José Ángel	Sporting Gijón	6
9	(Spain) Jairo Izquierdo	Cartagena	6
9	(Spain) Sergio Lozano	Villarreal B	6
9	(Spain) Dani Ojeda	Ponferradina	6

=== Zamora Trophy ===
The Zamora Trophy was awarded by newspaper Marca to the goalkeeper with the lowest goals-to-games ratio. A goalkeeper had to have played at least 28 games of 60 or more minutes to be eligible for the trophy.

Rank	Player	Club	Goals against	Matches	Average
1	(Spain) Raúl Fernández	Granada	19	29	0.66
2	(Spain) Daniel Cárdenas	Levante	23	34	0.68
2	(Spain) Álvaro Valles	Las Palmas	23	34	0.68
4	(Spain) José Antonio Caro	Burgos	29	39	0.74
5	(Spain) Antonio Sivera	Alavés	32	41	0.78

=== Hat-tricks ===
Player	For	Against	Result	Date	Round	Ref.
(Albania) Myrto Uzuni	Granada	Villarreal B	3–0 (H)	29 August 2022	3	
(Spain) Carlos Martínez	Andorra	Ponferradina	3–0 (H)	29 October 2022	13	
(Spain) Luis Rioja	Alavés	Ibiza	4–2 (H)	19 February 2023	28	

Note

(H) – Home; (A) – Away

== Awards ==
=== Monthly ===
Month	Player of the Month		Reference
Month	Player	Club	Reference
August	(Albania) Myrto Uzuni	Granada	
September	(Spain) José Antonio Caro	Burgos	
October	(Spain) Jonathan Viera	Las Palmas	
November	(Turkey) Sinan Bakış	Andorra	
December	(Spain) Roberto López	Mirandés	
January	(Spain) Stoichkov	Eibar	
February	(Spain) Luis Rioja	Alavés	
March	(Spain) Jon Bautista	Eibar	
April	(Spain) Sergi Enrich	Oviedo	

== Attendances ==
#	Football club	Home games	Average attendance
1	UD Las Palmas	21	20,643
2	Real Zaragoza	21	18,539
3	Málaga CF	21	17,477
4	Sporting de Gijón	21	17,224
5	Granada CF	21	14,755
6	Levante UD	21	14,138
7	Real Oviedo	21	13,312
8	Deportivo Alavés	21	13,166
9	CD Tenerife	21	12,030
10	Racing de Santander	21	12,014
11	Albacete Balompié	21	9,656
12	Burgos CF	21	8,609
13	FC Cartagena	21	7,845
14	CD Leganés	21	7,042
15	SD Ponferradina	21	5,511
16	SD Huesca	21	5,408
17	SD Eibar	21	5,235
18	CD Mirandés	21	3,063
19	CD Lugo	21	2,909
20	Villarreal CF B	21	2,770
21	UD Ibiza	21	2,335
22	FC Andorra	21	2,045

== See also ==
- 2022–23 La Liga
- 2022–23 Primera Federación
- 2022–23 Segunda Federación
- 2022–23 Tercera Federación
