= Paco Lopez =

Paco Lopez or Paco López may refer to:

- Paco López (footballer) (born 1967), Spanish football manager and former player
- Paco Lopez (jockey) (born 1985), Mexican-born American jockey
- Paco Lopez (radio DJ) (born 1959), Cuban-born U.S. Naturalized citizen and multi-media personality
