= 2012–13 1. Liga Promotion =

1. Liga Promotion
- Season: 2012–13
- Champions: FC Schaffhausen
- Promoted: FC Schaffhausen
- Relegated: FC Fribourg; Yverdon-Sport FC
- Matches played: 240
- Goals scored: 806 (3.36 per match)

The 2012–13 season of the 1. Liga Promotion was the initial season of this league, the 3rd division of Swiss Football and is the third level of the football hierarchy in Switzerland, behind the Super League and the Challenge League. The Championship had 16 teams and each team played 30 games. The champions of this division would be promoted and the last two teams would be relegated.

== Formation ==
In the summer of 2012, the Swiss Football Association restructured their league system. The top tier, Super League, remained unchanged. The second tier, Challenge League, was reduced from 16 to 10 teams. A new division was introduced to become the new third highest tier. Initially introduced as the 1. Liga Promotion, two years later it would be renamed to Promotion League. The existing 1. Liga was subsequently the fourth tier and renamed to 1. Liga Classic. This reconstruction was done to decrease the competitive gap between the two top tiers by converting the second to a purely professional league. The new Promotion League would therefore serve as the semi-professional link to amateur football. The number of U-21 teams, the eldest youth teams of the Super League clubs, permitted in this division was limited to four (until 2022) and they were not eligible to promotion.

Originally, for its maiden season, six teams were to be relegated after the 2011–12 Challenge League season and ten teams would be promoted from the 1. Liga, which was the division immediately below. However, due to the financial crises under club owner Bulat Tschagajew, the club Neuchâtel Xamax declared bankruptcy on 26 January 2012. The club was consequently excluded from the Super League and demoted to the sixth tier. Therefore, only five teams were relegated and eleven were brought up.

== Teams ==
The five teams relegated from the Challenge League were Stade Nyonnais, Carouge, Delémont, Kriens and Brühl. The four youth teams were Basel U-21, Sion U-21, St. Gallen U-21 and Zürich U-21. The other clubs who won promotion from the 1. Liga were Fribourg, Yverdon-Sport, Old Boys, Breitenrain, Tuggen, Schaffhausen and YF Juventus.

Club	Canton	Stadium	Capacity
Basel U-21	Basel-City	Stadion Rankhof or Youth Campus Basel	7,000; 1,000
FC Breitenrain Bern	Bern	Spitalacker	1,450
SC Brühl	St. Gallen	Paul-Grüninger-Stadion	4,200
SR Delémont	Jura	La Blancherie	5,263
Étoile Carouge FC	Geneva	Stade de la Fontenette	3,690
FC Fribourg	Fribourg	Stade Universitaire	9,000
SC Kriens	Lucerne	Stadion Kleinfeld	5,100
BSC Old Boys	Basel-City	Stadion Schützenmatte	8,000
FC Schaffhausen	Schaffhausen	Stadion Breite	7,300
Sion U-21	Valais	Stade de Tourbillon	20,200
St. Gallen U-21	St. Gallen	Espenmoos or Kybunpark	3,000; 19,264
FC Stade Nyonnais	Vaud	Stade de Colovray	7,200
FC Tuggen	Schwyz	Linthstrasse	2,800
SC YF Juventus	Zürich	Utogrund	2,850
Yverdon-Sport FC	Vaud	Stade Municipal	6,600
Zürich U-21	Zürich	Sportplatz Heerenschürli	1,120

== Final league table ==
Pos	Team	Pld	W	D	L	GF	GA	GD	Pts	Qualification or relegation
1	FC Schaffhausen	30	21	5	4	75	29	+46	68	Promotion to Challenge League
2	Basel U-21	30	21	5	4	81	38	+43	68	Not eligible to promotion
3	SC Young Fellows Juventus	30	20	6	4	75	29	+46	66	
4	Sion U-21	30	13	11	6	57	39	+18	50	
5	FC Tuggen	30	15	2	13	59	55	+4	47	
6	Zürich U-21	30	11	11	8	58	49	+9	44	
7	SC Kriens	30	13	5	12	54	49	+5	44	
8	SR Delémont	30	10	8	12	40	43	−3	38	
9	BSC Old Boys	30	10	7	13	42	48	−6	37	
10	FC Stade Nyonnais	30	8	9	13	43	51	−8	33	
11	FC Breitenrain Bern	30	8	9	13	40	63	−23	33	
12	SC Brühl	30	8	8	14	40	56	−16	32	
13	St. Gallen U-21	30	9	5	16	44	61	−17	32	
14	Étoile Carouge FC	30	9	5	16	35	54	−19	32	
15	FC Fribourg	30	8	7	15	38	57	−19	31	Relegation to 1. Liga Classic
16	Yverdon-Sport FC	30	2	5	23	25	85	−60	11	Relegation to 1. Liga Classic

Source: RSSSF
Rules for classification: 1) Points; 2) Goal difference; 3) Goals scored; 4) Head-to-head points; 5) Away goals scored; 6) Draw.

== Sources ==
- Josef Zindel (2018). FC Basel 1893. Die ersten 125 Jahre (in German). Basel: Friedrich Reinhardt Verlag. ISBN 978-3-7245-2305-5.
- Switzerland 2012/13 at RSSSF
