= Javier Calleja =

Spanish footballer (born 1978)

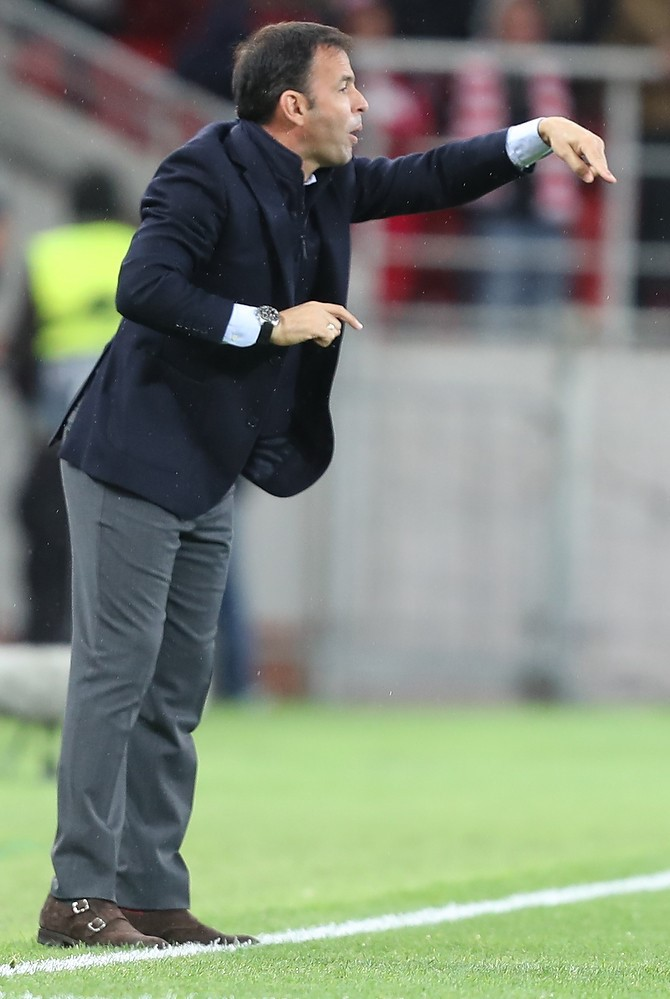
- Calleja managing Villarreal in 2018

Personal information
- Full name: Javier Calleja Revilla
- Date of birth: 12 May 1978 (age 48)
- Place of birth: Alcalá de Henares, Spain
- Height: 1.71 m (5 ft 7 in)
- Position: Midfielder

Team information
- Current team: Eldense (manager)

Youth career
- Real Madrid

Senior career*
Years	Team	Apps	(Gls)
1996–1998	Real Madrid C	60	(11)
1998	Almería	3	(0)
1998–1999	Alcalá	22	(8)
1999–2000	Onda	29	(17)
1999–2006	Villarreal	124	(9)
2006–2009	Málaga	104	(6)
2009–2012	Osasuna	46	(1)
Total		388	(52)

International career
1993	Spain U16	1	(0)

Managerial career
- 2012–2017: Villarreal (youth)
- 2017: Villarreal B
- 2017–2018: Villarreal
- 2019–2020: Villarreal
- 2021: Alavés
- 2022–2024: Levante
- 2024–2025: Oviedo
- 2025: Al-Riyadh
- 2026–: Eldense
- * Club domestic league appearances and goals

Javier Calleja Revilla (born 12 May 1978) is a Spanish former professional footballer who played mainly as a left midfielder. He is currently manager of Segunda División club Eldense.

He amassed La Liga totals of 192 matches and nine goals over one decade, mainly with Villarreal (six seasons) and Osasuna (three). He also represented Málaga in the competition, in a senior career that lasted 16 years.

Calleja later managed Villarreal, his first stint being in 2017.

== Playing career ==
After growing unsuccessfully through the ranks of Real Madrid and making his professional debut with lowly Almería, Alcalá de Henares-born Calleja signed with Villarreal, but spent some months with its farm team Onda. He made his first-team debut in the Segunda División, playing nine games in the 1999–2000 campaign as the side returned to La Liga and contributing one goal, in the 3–1 away loss against Osasuna.

Calleja was a very important member of the Yellow Submarine in his first three seasons in that tier, scoring four goals in 35 matches in 2001–02. On 5 April 2003, he netted a penalty kick as a late substitute in a 2–0 home win over Barcelona, dedicating the goal to his mother who had died hours before. However, the emergence of Santi Cazorla and two consecutive serious knee injuries limited him to just 25 appearances over the following three campaigns.

Ahead of 2006–07, Calleja left Villarreal and joined Málaga. He was an instant first choice in Andalusia, making 38 appearances in his second season as the club returned to the top flight after a two-year hiatus.

After a serious injury to teammate Adriano Rossato, Calleja spent much of the following campaign playing as left-back. On 12 June 2009, after his contract with Málaga expired, he moved to Osasuna in a 2+1 years deal.

== Coaching career ==
In September 2012, the 34-year-old Calleja announced his retirement and immediately returned to his former club Villarreal, being appointed manager of the youth sides. On 9 May 2017, he replaced Paco López at the helm of the reserves.

Calleja was named manager of the first team on 25 September 2017, in place of fired Fran Escribá. In his first season he led them to the fifth position, with the subsequent qualification for the group stage of the UEFA Europa League. On 20 May 2018, he extended his contract.

On 10 December 2018, with the side just three points above the relegation zone and having managed only one win in the last nine league fixtures, Calleja was dismissed. On 29 January 2019, however, he was reinstated in the post following the sacking of Luis García. He left in July 2020, after a late run of form won the team a fifth-place finish and European qualification.

On 5 April 2021, Calleja was appointed coach of last-placed Alavés on a short-term deal. Having achieved his target of avoiding relegation, he was rewarded with a two-year contract the following month. He left at the turn of the calendar year with the Basque club in the relegation zone, having taken one point from the last 15 and been eliminated from the second round of the Copa del Rey by third-tier Linares Deportivo.

Calleja was named manager of Levante on 16 October 2022. He led the team to the playoff final in his first season, losing to his previous employers by a 129th-minute penalty.

Calleja was relieved of his duties on 19 February 2024, after just three wins in the last 16 matches. On 6 July, he was appointed at Real Oviedo on a two-year deal, but it was terminated on 25 March 2025.

On 6 July 2025, Calleja became head coach of Saudi Pro League club Al-Riyadh. Only four months later, in spite of a relatively positive start to the campaign, he was dismissed.

On 16 September 2026, Calleja signed at second-division CD Eldense on a contract until 2028.

== Personal life ==
Calleja's brother, Fernando, who was born over a decade after him, was also a footballer but never any higher than the third division.

== Managerial statistics ==
As of match played 21 November 2026

Managerial record by team and tenure
Team	Nat	From	To	Record								Ref
Team	Nat	From	To	G	W	D	L	GF	GA	GD	Win %	Ref
Villarreal B	(Spain)	26 May 2017	25 September 2017	6	4	2	0	7	2	+5	66.67	
Villarreal	(Spain)	25 September 2017	10 December 2018	65	25	18	22	100	80	+20	38.46	
Villarreal	(Spain)	29 January 2019	19 July 2020	66	32	12	22	113	85	+28	48.48	
Alavés	(Spain)	5 April 2021	28 December 2021	29	9	6	14	31	41	−10	31.03	
Levante	(Spain)	16 October 2022	19 February 2024	68	29	27	12	85	61	+24	42.65	
Oviedo	(Spain)	6 July 2024	25 March 2025	33	14	10	9	42	37	+5	42.42	
Al-Riyadh	(Saudi Arabia)	6 July 2025	10 November 2025	10	3	2	5	10	19	−9	30.00	
Eldense	(Spain)	16 September 2026	Present	11	5	0	6	13	15	−2	45.45	
Career total				288	121	77	90	401	340	+61	42.01	—

== Honours ==
=== Player ===
Villarreal

- UEFA Intertoto Cup: 2003, 2004
