= 2017–18 La Liga =

87th season of La Liga

La Liga
- Season: 2017–18
- Dates: 18 August 2017 – 20 May 2018
- Champions: Barcelona; 25th title
- Relegated: Deportivo La Coruña; Las Palmas; Málaga
- Champions League: Barcelona; Atlético Madrid; Real Madrid; Valencia
- Europa League: Villarreal; Real Betis; Sevilla
- Matches: 380
- Goals: 1,024 (2.69 per match)
- Top goalscorer: Lionel Messi (34 goals)
- Best goalkeeper: Jan Oblak (0.59 goals/match)
- Biggest home win: Girona 6–0 Las Palmas (13 January 2018); Real Madrid 7–1 Deportivo La Coruña (21 January 2018); Real Madrid 6–0 Celta Vigo (12 May 2018)
- Biggest away win: Levante 0–5 Atlético Madrid (25 November 2017); Real Betis 0–5 Barcelona (21 January 2018)
- Highest scoring: Real Betis 3–6 Valencia (15 October 2017); Real Madrid 6–3 Girona (18 March 2018); Levante 5–4 Barcelona (13 May 2018)
- Longest winning run: 8 matches Valencia
- Longest unbeaten run: 36 matches Barcelona
- Longest winless run: 16 matches Las Palmas
- Longest losing run: 8 matches Las Palmas
- Highest attendance: 97,939; Barcelona 2–2 Real Madrid (6 May 2018)
- Lowest attendance: 0 Barcelona 3–0 Las Palmas (1 October 2017)
- Total attendance: 10,221,182
- Average attendance: 26,968

The 2017–18 La Liga season, also known as LaLiga Santander for sponsorship reasons, was the 87th since its establishment. The season began on 18 August 2017 and concluded on 20 May 2018. The fixtures were released on 21 July 2017.

Real Madrid were the defending champions. Barcelona, under new manager Ernesto Valverde, won the league title on 29 April 2018 with four matches to spare. It was the second part of a double-winning season for Barcelona, who also won the 2018 Copa del Rey final.

Levante, Girona, and Getafe were the newly promoted clubs competing in the season, with Girona entering La Liga for the first time in its history. At the end of the season, Málaga, Las Palmas, and Deportivo La Coruña were all relegated to the Segunda División.

== Summary ==
Prior to the season, several teams hired new managers, among them the previous season's runners-up Barcelona, who enlisted the services of Ernesto Valverde from Athletic Bilbao after the exit of Luis Enrique. Meanwhile, Valencia, who had struggled in the previous campaign, hired Marcelino.

In the transfer window, Barcelona were involved in the new world record transfer, selling Brazilian forward Neymar to French club Paris Saint-Germain for €222 million. They replaced him with young Frenchman Ousmane Dembélé, who signed for an initial €105 million fee that could rise to €150 million. Defending champions Real Madrid sold striker Álvaro Morata to Chelsea for €80 million and lost veteran defender Pepe to Turkey's Beşiktaş on a free transfer, while its largest fee paid during the window was €24 million for young defender Théo Hernandez from city rivals Atlético Madrid.

Barcelona first topped the table on 16 September after winning 5–0 in its third match of the season against neighbours Espanyol, eventually making a run of seven wins from the start of the season that ended with a 1–1 draw at Atlético Madrid. Valencia improved on its previous campaign and began its new season well, with Marcelino getting the best out of players such as Italian striker Simone Zaza and on-loan Portuguese winger Gonçalo Guedes. Real Madrid struggled in the first half of the season, with problems including a smaller squad, injuries and the comparatively poorer goalscoring form of Cristiano Ronaldo relative to recent seasons.

In January 2018, Barcelona added to its attack by spending €160 million on Brazilian Philippe Coutinho from Liverpool, while the end of a transfer ban allowed Atlético to register Diego Costa and Vitolo for action. Real Madrid manager Zinedine Zidane made no signings. Málaga were the first team to be relegated, ending its ten-season stay in La Liga with its descent confirmed after a 0–1 loss against Levante on 19 April. Three days later, Las Palmas' relegation was also confirmed after the Canarian team lost 0–4 at home to Alavés to end its three-year top flight status.

On 29 April, Barcelona sealed its 25th league title with a 4–2 win at Deportivo La Coruña, with Lionel Messi scoring a hat-trick. Barcelona still had four matches to play, and it was the second part of its double, having earlier won the 2018 Copa del Rey Final. The result also made Deportivo the final of the three relegated teams, sending them back to Segunda División for the first time in four years.

A day later, Real Betis, under new manager Quique Setién, booked its entry to the UEFA Europa League following a 2–1 win over Málaga. Betis had a chance of occupying Spain's fourth UEFA Champions League spot after Barcelona, Atlético Madrid and Real Madrid, but that was soon taken by Valencia, which returned to the competition for the first time in three years. In its second-last match of the season, Sevilla drew 2–2 with city rivals Betis to confirm seventh place and qualification for the UEFA Europa League at the expense of Getafe. Barcelona were on track to complete the first unbeaten La Liga season since the Spanish Civil War (and first in a 38-match season), but surprisingly lost its 37th match 4–5 at Levante, having only conceded 24 goals all season to that point.

== Teams ==
=== Promotion and relegation (pre-season) ===
A total of 20 teams competed in the league: the 17 sides from the 2016–17 season and the three promoted from the 2016–17 Segunda División. This latter three included the two top teams from the Segunda División and the winners of the play-offs.

Levante was the first team from Segunda División to achieve promotion, after a one-year absence from La Liga, on 29 April 2017 after winning 1–0 against Oviedo. Girona were promoted as the runners-up after drawing 0–0 against Zaragoza on 4 June 2017; this was its first promotion to the top division. It became the 62nd team to participate in the Spanish top level league. Getafe was the last to be promoted after defeating Huesca and Tenerife in the play-offs, one year after its relegation.

The three promoted clubs replaced Sporting Gijón, Osasuna and Granada, which were relegated at the end of the previous season, ending their top flight spells of two, one and six years respectively.

=== Stadia and locations ===
Location of teams in 2017–18 La Liga
Location of Community of Madrid teams in 2017–18 La Liga
Location of teams in 2017–18 La Liga (Canary Islands)

Atlético Madrid played for the first season at their new stadium, Wanda Metropolitano, replacing the Vicente Calderón Stadium, where they played since its opening in 1966.

Deportivo La Coruña signed a sponsorship contract with Abanca for renaming their stadium as Abanca-Riazor.

Real Betis completed their stadium renovation and it was grown to 60,720 seats, becoming the fourth biggest stadium in Spain. Meanwhile, after their first promotion ever to La Liga, Girona expanded Estadi Montilivi temporarily for hosting 13,450 spectators.

Team	Location	Stadium	Capacity
Alavés	Vitoria-Gasteiz	Mendizorrotza	19,840
Athletic Bilbao	Bilbao	San Mamés	53,289
Atlético Madrid	Madrid	Wanda Metropolitano	67,703
Barcelona	Barcelona	Camp Nou	99,354
Celta Vigo	Vigo	Balaídos	29,000
Deportivo La Coruña	A Coruña	Abanca-Riazor	32,912
Eibar	Eibar	Ipurua	7,083
Espanyol	Cornellà de Llobregat	RCDE Stadium	40,500
Getafe	Getafe	Coliseum Alfonso Pérez	17,000
Girona	Girona	Montilivi	13,450
Las Palmas	Las Palmas	Gran Canaria	32,400
Leganés	Leganés	Butarque	11,454
Levante	Valencia	Ciutat de València	26,354
Málaga	Málaga	La Rosaleda	30,044
Real Betis	Seville	Benito Villamarín	60,720
Real Madrid	Madrid	Santiago Bernabéu	81,044
Real Sociedad	San Sebastián	Anoeta	32,000
Sevilla	Seville	Ramón Sánchez Pizjuán	42,714
Valencia	Valencia	Mestalla	49,500
Villarreal	Villarreal	Estadio de la Cerámica	24,890

=== Personnel and sponsorship ===
Team	Manager	Captain	Kit manufacturer	Shirt sponsor
Alavés	(Spain) Abelardo Fernández	(Spain) Manu García	Kelme	LEA, Araba-Álava,^{1} Qubo,^{2} Euskaltel,^{3} Integra Energía^{3}
Athletic Bilbao	(Spain) José Ángel Ziganda	(Spain) Markel Susaeta	New Balance	Kutxabank
Atlético Madrid	(Argentina) Diego Simeone	(Spain) Gabi	Nike	Plus500
Barcelona	(Spain) Ernesto Valverde	(Spain) Andrés Iniesta	Nike	Rakuten, UNICEF,^{1} Beko^{2}
Celta Vigo	(Spain) Juan Carlos Unzué	(Spain) Hugo Mallo	Adidas	Estrella Galicia 0,0, Luckia,^{1} Abanca^{3}
Deportivo La Coruña	(Netherlands) Clarence Seedorf	(Spain) Pedro Mosquera	Macron	Estrella Galicia 0,0, Abanca,^{1} Luckia^{2}
Eibar	(Spain) José Luis Mendilibar	(Spain) Dani García	Puma	AVIA, Wiko^{1}
Espanyol	(Spain) David Gallego (caretaker)	(Spain) Javi López	Joma	Riviera Maya, InnJoo,^{1}^{3} SportyCo^{2}
Getafe	(Spain) José Bordalás	(Spain) Jorge Molina	Joma	Tecnocasa Group, Granitos Buenavista^{3}
Girona	(Spain) Pablo Machín	(Spain) Eloi Amagat	Umbro	Orgull Gironí, Costa Brava^{2}
Las Palmas	(Spain) Paco Jémez	(Spain) David García	Acerbis	Gran Canaria, Grupo DISA,^{1} IOC,^{1} Kalise Menorquina,^{2} beCordial Sports^{3}, Binter Canarias,^{3} Volkswagen Domingo Alonso^{3}
Leganés	(Spain) Asier Garitano	(Argentina) Martín Mantovani	Joma	GoldenPark,^{1} Sambil Outlet Madrid,^{2} BeSoccer,^{3} Elephone^{3}
Levante	(Spain) Paco López	(Spain) Pedro López	Macron	Jawwy, València,^{1} Baleària^{1}
Málaga	(Spain) José González	(Spain) Recio	Nike	Marathonbet, Benahavís,^{1} BeSoccer^{2}
Real Betis	(Spain) Quique Setién	(Spain) Joaquín	Adidas	Greenearth, Estadio Benito Villamarín,^{1} Wiko,^{1} Reale Seguros,^{2} BeSoccer^{3}
Real Madrid	(France) Zinedine Zidane	(Spain) Sergio Ramos	Adidas	Emirates
Real Sociedad	(Spain) Imanol Alguacil	(Spain) Xabi Prieto	Adidas	Euskaltel, Kutxabank,^{1} Reale Seguros^{2}
Sevilla	(Spain) Joaquín Caparrós (caretaker)	(Argentina) Nicolás Pareja	New Balance	Playtika, PlayWSOP.com, #Cordiality^{2}
Valencia	(Spain) Marcelino	(Spain) Dani Parejo	Adidas	BLU, beIN Sports,^{1} Sesderma,^{2} Alfa Romeo^{3}
Villarreal	(Spain) Javier Calleja	(Spain) Bruno	Joma	Pamesa Cerámica, Jawwy^{2}

1. On the back of shirt.
2. On the sleeves.
3. On the shorts.

=== Managerial changes ===
Team	Outgoing manager	Manner of departure	Date of vacancy	Position in table	Incoming manager	Date of appointment
Athletic Bilbao	(Spain) Ernesto Valverde	Resigned	23 May 2017	Pre-season	(Spain) José Ángel Ziganda	24 May 2017
Barcelona	(Spain) Luis Enrique	End of contract	29 May 2017	Pre-season	(Spain) Ernesto Valverde	29 May 2017
Las Palmas	(Spain) Quique Setién	End of contract	30 June 2017	Pre-season	(Spain) Manolo Márquez	3 July 2017
Valencia	(Spain) Voro	End of interim spell	11 May 2017	Pre-season	(Spain) Marcelino	11 May 2017
Real Betis	(Spain) Alexis Trujillo	End of interim spell	26 May 2017	Pre-season	(Spain) Quique Setién	26 May 2017
Celta Vigo	(Argentina) Eduardo Berizzo	End of contract	30 June 2017	Pre-season	(Spain) Juan Carlos Unzué	28 May 2017
Sevilla	(Argentina) Jorge Sampaoli	Signed by Argentina	20 May 2017	Pre-season	(Argentina) Eduardo Berizzo	1 June 2017
Alavés	(Argentina) Mauricio Pellegrino	Resigned	29 May 2017	Pre-season	(Argentina) Luis Zubeldía	17 June 2017
Alavés	(Argentina) Luis Zubeldía	Sacked	17 September 2017	20th	(Italy) Gianni De Biasi	22 September 2017
Villarreal	(Spain) Fran Escribá	Sacked	25 September 2017	14th	(Spain) Javier Calleja	25 September 2017
Las Palmas	(Spain) Manolo Márquez	Resigned	26 September 2017	15th	(Spain) Pako Ayestarán	27 September 2017
Deportivo La Coruña	(Spain) Pepe Mel	Sacked	24 October 2017	17th	(Spain) Cristóbal Parralo	24 October 2017
Alavés	(Italy) Gianni De Biasi	Sacked	27 November 2017	20th	(Spain) Abelardo Fernández	1 December 2017
Las Palmas	(Spain) Pako Ayestarán	Sacked	30 November 2017	19th	(Spain) Paco Jémez	21 December 2017
Sevilla	(Argentina) Eduardo Berizzo	Sacked	22 December 2017	5th	(Italy) Vincenzo Montella	28 December 2017
Málaga	(Spain) Míchel	Sacked	13 January 2018	19th	(Spain) José González	13 January 2018
Deportivo La Coruña	(Spain) Cristóbal Parralo	Sacked	4 February 2018	18th	(Netherlands) Clarence Seedorf	5 February 2018
Levante	(Spain) Juan Muñiz	Sacked	4 March 2018	17th	(Spain) Paco López	4 March 2018
Real Sociedad	(Spain) Eusebio Sacristán	Sacked	18 March 2018	15th	(Spain) Imanol Alguacil	18 March 2018
Espanyol	(Spain) Quique Sánchez Flores	Sacked	20 April 2018	16th	(Spain) David Gallego (caretaker)	20 April 2018
Sevilla	(Italy) Vincenzo Montella	Sacked	28 April 2018	7th	(Spain) Joaquín Caparrós (caretaker)	28 April 2018

== League table ==
=== Standings ===
Pos	Team	Pld	W	D	L	GF	GA	GD	Pts	Qualification or relegation
1	Barcelona (C)	38	28	9	1	99	29	+70	93	Qualification for the Champions League group stage
2	Atlético Madrid	38	23	10	5	58	22	+36	79	Qualification for the Champions League group stage
3	Real Madrid	38	22	10	6	94	44	+50	76	Qualification for the Champions League group stage
4	Valencia	38	22	7	9	65	38	+27	73	Qualification for the Champions League group stage
5	Villarreal	38	18	7	13	57	50	+7	61	Qualification for the Europa League group stage (Note: Since the winners of the 2017–18 Copa del Rey, Barcelona, qualified for European competition based on league position, the spot awarded to the cup winners (Europa League group stage) was passed to the sixth-placed team and the spot awarded to the sixth-placed team (Europa League second qualifying round) was passed to the seventh-placed team.)
6	Real Betis	38	18	6	14	60	61	−1	60	Qualification for the Europa League group stage
7	Sevilla	38	17	7	14	49	58	−9	58	Qualification for the Europa League second qualifying round
8	Getafe	38	15	10	13	42	33	+9	55	
9	Eibar	38	14	9	15	44	50	−6	51 (Note: Eibar finished ahead of Girona on head-to-head points: Eibar 4–1 Girona, Girona 1–4 Eibar.)	
10	Girona	38	14	9	15	50	59	−9	51	
11	Espanyol	38	12	13	13	36	42	−6	49 (Note: Head-to-head points: Espanyol 8, Real Sociedad 4, Celta Vigo 4 (Espanyol 2–1 Real Sociedad, Real Sociedad 1–1 Espanyol, Espanyol 2–1 Celta Vigo, Celta Vigo 2–2 Espanyol, Real Sociedad 1–2 Celta Vigo, Celta Vigo 2–3 Real Sociedad).)	
12	Real Sociedad	38	14	7	17	66	59	+7	49	
13	Celta Vigo	38	13	10	15	59	60	−1	49	
14	Alavés	38	15	2	21	40	50	−10	47	
15	Levante	38	11	13	14	44	58	−14	46	
16	Athletic Bilbao	38	10	13	15	41	49	−8	43 (Note: Athletic Bilbao finished ahead of Leganés on head-to-head goal difference: Athletic Bilbao 2–0 Leganés, Leganés 1–0 Athletic Bilbao.)	
17	Leganés	38	12	7	19	34	51	−17	43	
18	Deportivo La Coruña (R)	38	6	11	21	38	76	−38	29	Relegation to Segunda División
19	Las Palmas (R)	38	5	7	26	24	74	−50	22	Relegation to Segunda División
20	Málaga (R)	38	5	5	28	24	61	−37	20	Relegation to Segunda División

Source: La Liga, Soccerway
Rules for classification: 1) Points; 2) Head-to-head points; 3) Head-to-head goal difference; 4) Goal difference; 5) Goals scored; 6) Fair-play points (Note: Head-to-head record is used only after all the matches between the teams in question have been played)
(C) Champions; (R) Relegated

=== Results ===
Home \ Away	ALA	ATH	ATM	BAR	CEL	DEP	EIB	ESP	GET	GIR	LPA	LEG	LEV	MGA	BET	RMA	RSO	SEV	VAL	VIL
Alavés	—	3–1	0–1	0–2	2–1	1–0	1–2	1–0	2–0	1–2	2–0	2–2	1–0	1–0	1–3	1–2	0–2	1–0	1–2	0–3
Athletic Bilbao	2–0	—	1–2	0–2	1–1	2–3	1–1	0–1	0–0	2–0	0–0	2–0	1–3	2–1	2–0	0–0	0–0	1–0	1–1	1–1
Atlético Madrid	1–0	2–0	—	1–1	3–0	1–0	2–2	0–2	2–0	1–1	3–0	4–0	3–0	1–0	0–0	0–0	2–1	2–0	1–0	1–1
Barcelona	2–1	2–0	1–0	—	2–2	4–0	6–1	5–0	0–0	6–1	3–0	3–1	3–0	2–0	2–0	2–2	1–0	2–1	2–1	5–1
Celta Vigo	1–0	3–1	0–1	2–2	—	1–1	2–0	2–2	1–1	3–3	2–1	1–0	4–2	0–0	3–2	2–2	2–3	4–0	1–1	0–1
Deportivo La Coruña	1–0	2–2	0–1	2–4	1–3	—	1–1	0–0	2–1	1–2	1–1	1–0	2–2	3–2	0–1	0–3	2–4	0–0	1–2	2–4
Eibar	0–1	0–1	0–1	0–2	0–4	0–0	—	3–1	0–1	4–1	1–0	1–0	2–2	1–1	5–0	1–2	0–0	5–1	2–1	1–0
Espanyol	0–0	1–1	1–0	1–1	2–1	4–1	0–1	—	1–0	0–1	1–1	0–1	0–0	4–1	1–0	1–0	2–1	0–3	0–2	1–1
Getafe	4–1	2–2	0–1	1–2	3–0	3–0	0–0	1–0	—	1–1	2–0	0–0	0–1	1–0	0–1	1–2	2–1	0–1	1–0	4–0
Girona	2–3	2–0	2–2	0–3	1–0	2–0	1–4	0–2	1–0	—	6–0	3–0	1–1	1–0	0–1	2–1	1–1	0–1	0–1	1–2
Las Palmas	0–4	1–0	1–5	1–1	2–5	1–3	1–2	2–2	0–1	1–2	—	0–2	0–2	1–0	1–0	0–3	0–1	1–2	2–1	0–2
Leganés	1–0	1–0	0–0	0–3	1–0	0–0	0–1	3–2	1–2	0–0	0–0	—	0–3	2–0	3–2	1–3	1–0	2–1	0–1	3–1
Levante	0–2	1–2	0–5	5–4	0–1	2–2	2–1	1–1	1–1	1–2	2–1	0–0	—	1–0	0–2	2–2	3–0	2–1	1–1	1–0
Málaga	0–3	3–3	0–1	0–2	2–1	3–2	0–1	0–1	0–1	0–0	1–3	0–2	0–0	—	0–2	1–2	2–0	0–1	1–2	1–0
Real Betis	2–0	0–2	0–1	0–5	2–1	2–1	2–0	3–0	2–2	2–2	1–0	3–2	4–0	2–1	—	3–5	0–0	2–2	3–6	2–1
Real Madrid	4–0	1–1	1–1	0–3	6–0	7–1	3–0	2–0	3–1	6–3	3–0	2–1	1–1	3–2	0–1	—	5–2	5–0	2–2	0–1
Real Sociedad	2–1	3–1	3–0	2–4	1–2	5–0	3–1	1–1	1–2	5–0	2–2	3–2	3–0	0–2	4–4	1–3	—	3–1	2–3	3–0
Sevilla	1–0	2–0	2–5	2–2	2–1	2–0	3–0	1–1	1–1	1–0	1–0	2–1	0–0	2–0	3–5	3–2	1–0	—	0–2	2–2
Valencia	3–1	3–2	0–0	1–1	2–1	2–1	0–0	1–0	1–2	2–1	1–0	3–0	3–1	5–0	2–0	1–4	2–1	4–0	—	0–1
Villarreal	1–2	1–3	2–1	0–2	4–1	1–1	3–0	0–0	1–0	0–2	4–0	2–1	2–1	2–0	3–1	2–2	4–2	2–3	1–0	—

Source: BDFutbol
Legend: Blue = home team win; Yellow = draw; Red = away team win.

== Season statistics ==
=== Scoring ===
- First goal of the season:
  (Brazil) Gabriel for Leganés against Alavés (18 August 2017)
- Last goal of the season:
  (Brazil) Philippe Coutinho for Barcelona against Real Sociedad (20 May 2018)

=== Top goalscorers ===
Rank	Player	Club	Goals
1	(Argentina) Lionel Messi	Barcelona	34
2	(Portugal) Cristiano Ronaldo	Real Madrid	26
3	(Uruguay) Luis Suárez	Barcelona	25
4	(Spain) Iago Aspas	Celta Vigo	22
5	(Uruguay) Cristhian Stuani	Girona	21
6	(France) Antoine Griezmann	Atlético Madrid	19
7	(Uruguay) Maxi Gómez	Celta Vigo	17
8	(Wales) Gareth Bale	Real Madrid	16
8	(Spain) Gerard Moreno	Espanyol	16
8	(Spain) Rodrigo	Valencia	16

=== Top assists ===
Rank	Player	Club	Assists
1	(Spain) Pablo Fornals	Villarreal	12
1	(Argentina) Lionel Messi	Barcelona	12
1	(Uruguay) Luis Suárez	Barcelona	12
4	(France) Karim Benzema	Real Madrid	10
5	(France) Antoine Griezmann	Atlético Madrid	9
5	(Portugal) Gonçalo Guedes	Valencia	9
5	(Denmark) Pione Sisto	Celta Vigo	9
5	(Denmark) Daniel Wass	Celta Vigo	9
9	(Spain) Jordi Alba	Barcelona	8
9	(Spain) José Ángel	Eibar	8
9	(Mexico) Andrés Guardado	Real Betis	8
9	(Spain) José Luis Morales	Levante	8

=== Zamora Trophy ===
The Ricardo Zamora Trophy was awarded by newspaper Marca to the goalkeeper with the lowest ratio of goals conceded to matches played. A goalkeeper had to play at least 28 matches of 60 or more minutes to be eligible for the trophy.

Rank	Player	Club	Goals against	Matches	Average
1	(Slovenia) Jan Oblak	Atlético Madrid	22	37	0.59
2	(Germany) Marc-André ter Stegen	Barcelona	28	37	0.76
3	(Spain) Vicente Guaita	Getafe	26	33	0.79
4	(Brazil) Neto	Valencia	33	33	1.00
5	(Spain) Pau López	Espanyol	31	28	1.11

=== Hat-tricks ===
Player	For	Against	Result	Date	Round
(Argentina) Lionel Messi	Barcelona	Espanyol	5–0 (H)	9 September 2017	3
(Italy) Simone Zaza	Valencia	Málaga	5–0 (H)	19 September 2017	5
(Argentina) Lionel Messi^{4}	Barcelona	Eibar	6–1 (H)	19 September 2017	5
(Democratic Republic of the Congo) Cédric Bakambu	Villarreal	Eibar	3–0 (H)	1 October 2017	7
(Spain) Iago Aspas	Celta Vigo	Las Palmas	5–2 (A)	16 October 2017	8
(Spain) Ibai Gómez	Alavés	Girona	3–2 (A)	4 December 2017	14
(Kenya) Michael Olunga	Girona	Las Palmas	6–0 (H)	13 January 2018	19
(Portugal) Cristiano Ronaldo	Real Madrid	Real Sociedad	5–2 (H)	10 February 2018	23
(Uruguay) Luis Suárez	Barcelona	Girona	6–1 (H)	24 February 2018	25
(France) Antoine Griezmann	Atlético Madrid	Sevilla	5–2 (A)	25 February 2018	25
(France) Antoine Griezmann^{4}	Atlético Madrid	Leganés	4–0 (H)	28 February 2018	26
(Portugal) Cristiano Ronaldo^{4}	Real Madrid	Girona	6–3 (H)	18 March 2018	29
(Spain) Iago Aspas	Celta Vigo	Sevilla	4–0 (H)	7 April 2018	31
(Argentina) Lionel Messi	Barcelona	Leganés	3–1 (H)	7 April 2018	31
(Colombia) Carlos Bacca	Villarreal	Celta Vigo	4–1 (H)	28 April 2018	35
(Argentina) Lionel Messi	Barcelona	Deportivo La Coruña	4–2 (A)	29 April 2018	35
(Ghana) Emmanuel Boateng	Levante	Barcelona	5–4 (H)	13 May 2018	37
(Brazil) Philippe Coutinho	Barcelona	Levante	4–5 (A)	13 May 2018	37

Note

^{4} Player scored 4 goals; (H) – Home; (A) – Away

=== Discipline ===
- Most yellow cards (club): 134
  - Getafe
- Fewest yellow cards (club): 62
  - Real Sociedad
- Most yellow cards (player): 16
  - (Colombia) Jefferson Lerma (Levante)
- Most red cards (club): 8
  - Málaga
- Fewest red cards (club): 0
  - Athletic Bilbao
  - Girona
- Most red cards (player): 2
  - (Spain) Jordi Amat (Real Betis)
  - (Serbia) Zdravko Kuzmanović (Málaga)
  - (Spain) Sergio Ramos (Real Madrid)
  - (Spain) Sergi Roberto (Barcelona)

=== Overall ===
- Most wins - Barcelona (28)
- Fewest wins - Las Palmas and Malaga (5)
- Most draws - Espanyol, Levante and Bilbao (13)
- Fewest draws - Alavés (2)
- Most losses - Malaga (28)
- Fewest losses - Barcelona (1)
- Most goals scored - Barcelona (99)
- Fewest goals scored - Las Palmas and Malaga (24)
- Most goals conceded - Deportivo La Coruña (76)
- Fewest goals conceded - Atlético Madrid (22)

== Average attendances ==
A match played behind closed doors is not included.

Pos	Team	Total	High	Low	Average	Change
1	Barcelona	1,248,657	97,939	49,693	69,370	−9.9%^{3}
2	Real Madrid	1,247,398	80,737	55,143	65,653	−3.5%
3	Atlético Madrid	1,054,190	66,591	35,033	55,484	+24.2%^{2}
4	Real Betis	881,198	55,453	31,311	46,379	+41.4%
5	Valencia	735,187	47,794	27,930	38,694	+14.0%
6	Athletic Bilbao	710,148	45,761	24,587	37,376	−9.1%
7	Sevilla	628,281	40,385	22,643	33,067	+0.7%
8	Deportivo La Coruña	392,058	27,877	12,904	20,635	−7.8%
9	Málaga	387,224	27,117	10,098	20,380	−7.9%
10	Real Sociedad	374,299	24,675	15,562	19,700	−8.0%
11	Levante	335,939	23,542	12,942	17,681	+45.9%^{1}
12	Espanyol	335,309	24,836	11,659	17,648	−12.1%
13	Villarreal	317,267	21,087	12,398	16,698	−3.8%
14	Celta Vigo	309,098	20,895	10,840	16,298	−1.0%
15	Las Palmas	306,535	26,163	4,624	16,133	−20.9%
16	Alavés	296,123	19,840	12,594	15,585	+2.7%
17	Girona	194,626	13,305	6,392	10,243	+86.9%^{1}
18	Getafe	194,375	15,350	5,097	10,230	+43.1%^{1}
19	Leganés	177,382	11,454	5,970	9,336	+0.2%
20	Eibar	101,160	6,725	4,056	5,324	+0.2%
	League total	10,226,454	97,939	4,056	26,983	−2.4%

Source: World Football
Notes:
1: Team played last season in Segunda División.
2: Atlético Madrid played the previous season at Vicente Calderón Stadium.
3: Barcelona played its match against Las Palmas behind closed doors.

== Awards ==
=== Seasonal ===
La Liga's governing body, the Liga de Fútbol Profesional, honoured the competition's best players and coach with the La Liga Awards.

Award	Recipient
Best Player	(Argentina) Lionel Messi (Barcelona)
Best Goalkeeper	(Slovenia) Jan Oblak (Atlético Madrid)
Best Coach	(Spain) Marcelino García Toral (Valencia)

==== Team of the Year ====

Team of the Year
Goalkeeper	(Slovenia) Jan Oblak (Atlético Madrid)			
Defenders	(Spain) Sergi Roberto (Barcelona)	(France) Samuel Umtiti (Barcelona)	(Spain) Marc Bartra (Real Betis)	(Spain) Jordi Alba (Barcelona)
Midfielders	(Spain) Dani Parejo (Valencia)		(Croatia) Ivan Rakitić (Barcelona)	(Spain) Isco (Real Madrid)
Forwards	(Spain) Iago Aspas (Celta Vigo)		(Portugal) Cristiano Ronaldo (Real Madrid)	(Argentina) Lionel Messi (Barcelona)

=== Monthly ===
Month	Player of the Month		Reference
Month	Player	Club	Reference
September	(Italy) Simone Zaza	Valencia	
October	(Democratic Republic of the Congo) Cédric Bakambu	Villarreal	
November	(Spain) Iago Aspas	Celta Vigo	
December	(Uruguay) Luis Suárez	Barcelona	
January	(Spain) Aritz Aduriz	Athletic Bilbao	
February	(France) Antoine Griezmann	Atlético Madrid	
March	(Spain) Rodrigo	Valencia	
April	(Argentina) Lionel Messi	Barcelona	
