= Joaquín Caparrós =

Spanish football manager (born 1955)

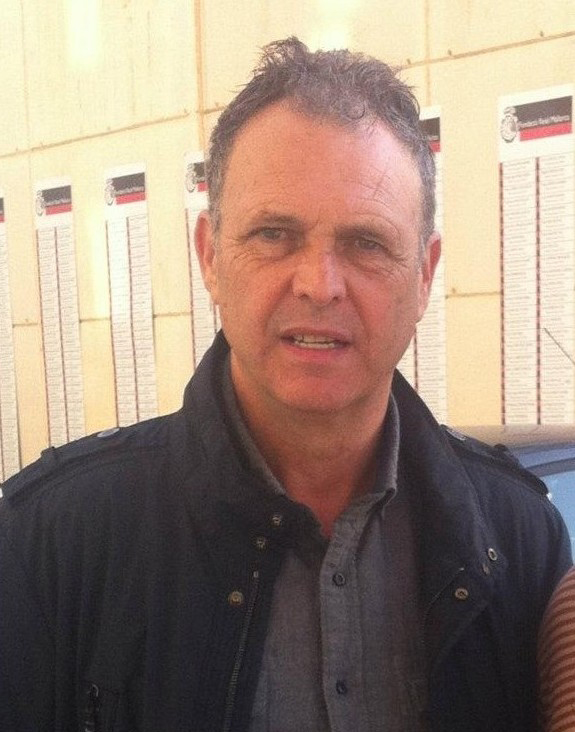
- Caparrós in 2012

Personal information
- Full name: Joaquín de Jesús Caparrós Camino
- Date of birth: 15 October 1955 (age 71)
- Place of birth: Utrera, Spain
- Height: 1.76 m (5 ft 9 in)

Youth career
- Real Madrid

Senior career*
Years	Team	Apps	(Gls)
- Plus Ultra
- Leganés
- Conquense
- Tarancón

Managerial career
- 1981–1984: San José Obrero
- 1984–1986: Campillo
- 1986–1989: Motilla
- 1989–1990: Castile-La Mancha
- 1990–1992: Gimnástico Alcázar
- 1992–1993: Conquense
- 1994–1995: Manzanares
- 1995–1996: Moralo
- 1996–1999: Recreativo
- 1998–2000: Andalusia
- 1999: Villarreal
- 2000–2005: Sevilla
- 2005–2007: Deportivo La Coruña
- 2007–2011: Athletic Bilbao
- 2011: Neuchâtel Xamax
- 2011–2013: Mallorca
- 2013–2014: Levante
- 2014–2015: Granada
- 2016–2017: Osasuna
- 2017: Al Ahli
- 2018: Sevilla (caretaker)
- 2019: Sevilla (caretaker)
- 2020–2022: Armenia
- 2025: Sevilla
- * Club domestic league appearances and goals

Joaquín de Jesús Caparrós Camino (born 15 October 1955) is a Spanish football manager.

After winning the Segunda División with Sevilla in 2001, Caparrós was a regular on the La Liga sidelines for the best part of two decades, coaching Sevilla, Deportivo de La Coruña, Athletic Bilbao, Mallorca, Levante, Granada and Osasuna in the competition. He had brief spells in Switzerland and Qatar, and also managed the Armenia national team for two years.

== Football career ==
=== Early career ===
Caparrós was born in Utrera, Province of Seville, Andalusia. After an obscure career as a player, he started coaching in his mid-20s, his first club being amateurs San José Obrero. The first professional spell came at local Recreativo de Huelva, which he helped reach Segunda División in the second of his three years.

Caparrós began the 1999–2000 season on Villarreal's bench, lasting only seven games; his successor Paquito guided the Valencians to La Liga in third place. He also co-managed the Andalusia autonomous team with José Enrique Díaz for two friendlies in the late 1990s.

=== Sevilla ===
On 25 May 2000, Caparrós was unveiled as the new Sevilla manager. He ended their one-year top-flight exile in his first season at the Ramón Sánchez Pizjuán Stadium, winning the second division.

With youth products such as Carlos Marchena, José Antonio Reyes and Jesuli – Sergio Ramos soon followed – and the future signings of Júlio Baptista, Adriano, Daniel Alves and Renato, Caparrós set the foundations for future domestic and European success, but was replaced by Juande Ramos before any of the actual conquests.

=== Deportivo and Athletic ===
In the summer of 2005, Caparrós moved to Deportivo de La Coruña, being fired after a poor second season. He was appointed at Athletic Bilbao afterwards, beating former club Sevilla in the semi-finals of the 2008–09 edition of the Copa del Rey (4–2 aggregate) and qualifying for the UEFA Europa League as Barcelona won the treble.

Caparrós led the Lions to the sixth position in the 2010–11 campaign, once again qualifying for the Europa League. On 7 July 2011, after his contract expired – the club also underwent a chairman change after an election – he left Athletic Bilbao, being replaced by Argentine Marcelo Bielsa.

=== Foreign stints and return to La Liga ===
On 27 July 2011, Caparrós accepted a one-year offer from Swiss Super League team Neuchâtel Xamax, who had sacked François Ciccolini after losing the first two games of the campaign. He resigned after just five matches, following a disagreement with owner Bulat Chagaev. On 3 October, Mallorca vice-president Lorenzo Serra Ferrer announced that the Balearic Islands side had reached an agreement with the manager.

On 4 February 2013, after a promising start of the season, with three home wins and two away draws in the first five rounds, Caparrós was relieved of his duties as Mallorca ranked second-bottom. His last game in charge was a 3–0 away loss against Real Sociedad.

Caparrós was given a two-year contract extension on 23 May 2014, after finishing his debut campaign with Levante in tenth position. However, the following week, he left and joined Granada of the same league.

On 16 January 2015, as Granada ranked last in the table and had just been ousted from the domestic cup by Sevilla (6–1 on aggregate), Caparrós was relieved of his duties. He returned to work in early November of the following year, replacing the sacked Enrique Martín at the helm of Osasuna but being himself dismissed on 5 January 2017 after seven losses in as many league games.

On 2 June 2017, Caparrós left Europe for the first time in his career to manage Qatari club Al Ahli. He resigned on 27 December, citing personal reasons.

=== Sevilla return ===
Caparrós returned to Sevilla on 28 April 2018 following the dismissal of Vincenzo Montella, being appointed as caretaker manager until the end of the season. In May, after the signing of Pablo Machín as his successor, he was named the club's director of football.

On 15 March 2019, Caparrós again took over as caretaker until the end of the season following the dismissal of Machín after only ten months in charge, after Sevilla were knocked out of the Europa League round of 16 by Slavia Prague.

=== Armenia ===
Caparrós moved into international coaching on 10 March 2020, signing with Armenia until 30 November 2021. On his debut on 5 September, the side lost 2–1 away to North Macedonia in the UEFA Nations League. On 18 November, after a 1–0 win against the same opponent, his team won their group and were promoted.

On 28 June 2021, Caparrós' contract was extended until the end of 2022. In his final game on 27 September, Armenia were relegated back to the third tier of the Nations League after a 3–2 loss away to the Republic of Ireland, settled by a penalty kick awarded for handball in added time; his deal with the Football Federation of Armenia was mutually terminated two days later. During his spell, the team achieved the longest unbeaten run in its history, nine games.

=== Fourth Sevilla spell ===
On 13 April 2025, Caparrós returned to Sevilla for a fourth spell, signing until the end of the season.

== Managerial statistics ==
As of match played 25 May 2025

Managerial record by team and tenure
Team	Nat	From	To	Record								Ref
Team	Nat	From	To	G	W	D	L	GF	GA	GD	Win %	Ref
Gimnástico Alcázar	(Spain)	1 July 1990	30 June 1992	88	37	29	22	114	79	+35	42.05	
Conquense	(Spain)	1 July 1992	30 June 1993	44	30	8	6	87	24	+63	68.18	
Manzanares	(Spain)	1 July 1994	30 June 1995	38	15	12	11	50	42	+8	39.47	
Moralo	(Spain)	1 July 1995	30 June 1996	44	26	9	9	80	33	+47	59.09	
Recreativo	(Spain)	1 July 1996	30 June 1999	140	61	44	35	154	110	+44	43.57	
Andalusia	(Spain)	30 June 1998	1 July 2000	2	2	0	0	3	0	+3	100.00	—
Villarreal	(Spain)	1 July 1999	4 October 1999	7	2	3	2	7	8	−1	28.57	
Sevilla	(Spain)	1 July 2000	3 June 2005	226	102	55	69	310	235	+75	45.13	
Deportivo La Coruña	(Spain)	3 June 2005	17 June 2007	98	38	25	35	110	114	−4	38.78	
Athletic Bilbao	(Spain)	13 July 2007	7 July 2011	187	70	44	73	242	260	−18	37.43	
Neuchâtel Xamax	(Switzerland)	27 July 2011	3 September 2011	5	1	3	1	4	5	−1	20.00	—
Mallorca	(Spain)	3 October 2011	4 February 2013	64	19	16	29	70	95	−25	29.69	
Levante	(Spain)	9 June 2013	27 May 2014	44	14	13	17	42	53	−11	31.82	
Granada	(Spain)	28 May 2014	16 January 2015	22	3	9	10	14	36	−22	13.64	
Osasuna	(Spain)	8 November 2016	5 January 2017	8	1	0	7	3	17	−14	12.50	
Al Ahli	(Qatar)	3 June 2017	27 December 2017	16	6	4	6	21	25	−4	37.50	—
Sevilla (caretaker)	(Spain)	28 April 2018	19 May 2018	4	3	1	0	7	4	+3	75.00	
Sevilla (caretaker)	(Spain)	15 March 2019	23 May 2019	11	6	1	4	16	11	+5	54.55	
Armenia	(Armenia)	10 March 2020	29 September 2022	26	9	5	12	25	56	−31	34.62	
Sevilla	(Spain)	13 April 2025	16 June 2025	7	1	2	4	8	13	−5	14.29	
Total				1,081	446	283	352	1,369	1,220	+149	41.26	

== Honours ==
Sevilla

- Segunda División: 2000–01

Individual

- Armenian Coach of the Year: 2020, 2021

== See also ==
- List of football managers with the most matches
