= Luis García (footballer, born 1972) =

Spanish footballer and manager

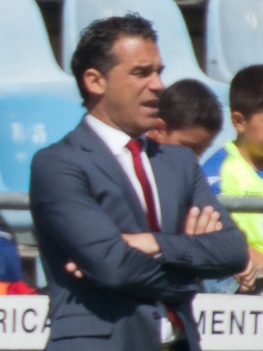
- García as manager of Getafe in 2013

Personal information
- Full name: Luis García Plaza
- Date of birth: 1 December 1972 (age 53)
- Place of birth: Madrid, Spain
- Height: 1.78 m (5 ft 10 in)
- Position: Defender

Team information
- Current team: Sevilla (manager)

Youth career
- Colegio Amorós
- Atlético Madrid

Senior career*
| Years | Team | Apps | (Gls) |
| 1991–1995 | Atlético Madrid B | 54 | (2) |
| 1995 | Yeclano | 13 | (0) |
| 1995–1996 | Rayo Vallecano B | | |
| 1996 | → Talavera (loan) | 8 | (0) |
| 1996–2000 | Benidorm | 49 | (1) |

Managerial career
- 2001–2003: Altea
- 2003–2005: Villajoyosa
- 2005: Altea
- 2005–2006: Villarreal B
- 2006–2007: Elche
- 2007–2008: Benidorm
- 2008–2011: Levante
- 2011–2014: Getafe
- 2014–2016: Baniyas
- 2017–2018: Beijing Renhe
- 2018–2019: Villarreal
- 2019: Beijing Renhe
- 2019–2020: Al Shabab
- 2020–2022: Mallorca
- 2022–2024: Alavés
- 2026–: Sevilla
- * Club domestic league appearances and goals

Luis García Plaza (Spanish pronunciation: [ˈlwis ɣaɾˈθi.a ˈplaθa]; (Note: In isolation, García is pronounced [ɡaɾˈθi.a].) born 1 December 1972) is a Spanish former professional footballer who played as a right-back or a central defender. He is the current manager of La Liga club Sevilla.

== Playing career ==
In his career, García never played in higher than Segunda División B. Born in Madrid, he finished his development at Atlético Madrid and, after three seasons with its reserves, moved to Yeclano, where he coincided with José Luis Oltra and Paulino.

Still in the Madrid community, García then represented Rayo Vallecano B, completing his sole season with the club on loan at Talavera. He signed for Benidorm in the summer of 1996, spending four years at the Alicante side.

García was forced to retire due to injury in 2000, aged only 27.

== Coaching career ==
García took up coaching in 2001, starting with amateurs Altea and moving two years later to another club in the Valencian Community, Villajoyosa of the third tier, remaining the same amount of time there.

In 2005–06, after a very brief spell at Altea, García led Villarreal's reserves to the Tercera División championship, but the team failed to gain promotion in the subsequent playoffs. Afterwards, he signed with Elche in Segunda División – and also in the Valencia region – being sacked on 7 January 2007 following a 1–1 home draw against Cádiz (the team eventually retained their league status).

After one year with former club Benidorm, García was appointed at Levante, helping to a return to La Liga after a three-year absence in his second season. In the following campaign, he led the side to the 14th place, the home highlights being a 2–0 win over Atlético Madrid and home draws with Real Madrid (0–0) and Barcelona (1–1).

On 8 June 2011, García signed for Getafe for three years. He coached the capital outskirts team to the 11th position in his debut season, finishing one better the following year.

García was dismissed on 10 March 2014, after Getafe only collected four draws in 12 games. In the following two seasons, he worked in the UAE First Division League with Baniyas.

In June 2017, García was appointed as manager of China League One club Beijing Renhe on a five-month deal. He coached the team to promotion back to the Super League in his first season, collecting 13 wins, two draws and three losses; on 9 November, he extended his contract.

García returned to Villarreal on 10 December 2018, replacing the fired Javier Calleja at the helm of the first team. After only one month in charge, and no league wins, he too was relieved of his duties.

On 9 July 2019, García headed back to Beijing Renhe following the resignation of Aleksandar Stanojević. He left on 18 November following their relegation, having won none and drawn two of 11 games. Before the end of the year, he found a new job at Al-Shabab, ninth in the Saudi Pro League.

On 6 August 2020, García replaced Espanyol-bound Vicente Moreno at Mallorca in the second division, winning promotion as runners-up in his debut campaign. On 22 March 2022, with the club inside the relegation zone, he was dismissed.

García was appointed at second-tier Alavés on 23 May 2022, on a one-year contract. He achieved promotion in his first season via the playoffs, then secured survival the following campaign with four games to spare.

On 2 December 2024, García was relieved of his duties. In March 2026, he took over at Sevilla on a one-and-a-half-year contract.

== Managerial statistics ==
As of match played 21 November 2026

Managerial record by team and tenure
| Team | Nat | From | To | Record | | | | | | | | Ref |
| Team | Nat | From | To | G | W | D | L | GF | GA | GD | Win % | Ref |
|---|---|---|---|---|---|---|---|---|---|---|---|---|
| Altea | (Spain) | 1 July 2001 | 30 June 2003 | 68 | 35 | 22 | 11 | 111 | 56 | +55 | 51.47 | |
| Villajoyosa | (Spain) | 30 June 2003 | 30 May 2005 | 76 | 31 | 16 | 29 | 80 | 82 | −2 | 40.79 | |
| Altea | (Spain) | 30 May 2005 | 30 May 2005 | 0 | 0 | 0 | 0 | 0 | 0 | +0 | — | |
| Villarreal B | (Spain) | 30 May 2005 | 1 July 2006 | 46 | 32 | 11 | 3 | 86 | 26 | +60 | 69.57 | |
| Elche | (Spain) | 1 July 2006 | 7 January 2007 | 21 | 5 | 7 | 9 | 21 | 27 | −6 | 23.81 | |
| Benidorm | (Spain) | 1 July 2007 | 19 July 2008 | 40 | 16 | 12 | 12 | 44 | 41 | +3 | 40.00 | |
| Levante | (Spain) | 20 July 2008 | 7 June 2011 | 128 | 51 | 34 | 43 | 170 | 170 | +0 | 39.84 | |
| Getafe | (Spain) | 8 June 2011 | 10 March 2014 | 113 | 34 | 29 | 50 | 117 | 164 | −47 | 30.09 | |
| Baniyas | (United Arab Emirates) | 10 July 2014 | 18 March 2016 | 63 | 22 | 19 | 22 | 95 | 85 | +10 | 34.92 | |
| Beijing Renhe | (China) | 8 June 2017 | 10 December 2018 | 50 | 22 | 14 | 14 | 67 | 61 | +6 | 44.00 | |
| Villarreal | (Spain) | 10 December 2018 | 29 January 2019 | 9 | 1 | 5 | 3 | 11 | 15 | −4 | 11.11 | |
| Beijing Renhe | (China) | 9 July 2019 | 12 November 2019 | 11 | 0 | 2 | 9 | 9 | 27 | −18 | 0.00 | |
| Al Shabab | (Saudi Arabia) | 12 December 2019 | 18 July 2020 | 13 | 7 | 1 | 5 | 22 | 17 | +5 | 53.85 | |
| Mallorca | (Spain) | 6 August 2020 | 22 March 2022 | 78 | 35 | 19 | 24 | 95 | 82 | +13 | 44.87 | |
| Alavés | (Spain) | 23 May 2022 | 2 December 2024 | 108 | 44 | 28 | 36 | 119 | 108 | +11 | 40.74 | |
| Sevilla | (Spain) | 24 March 2026 | Present | 23 | 10 | 4 | 9 | 30 | 31 | −1 | 43.48 | |
| Total | | | | 847 | 345 | 223 | 279 | 1,077 | 992 | +85 | 40.73 | — |
