= Carlos Sánchez (football manager) =

Spanish football manager

Personal information
- Full name: Carlos Sánchez Ruiz
- Date of birth: 16 January 1989 (age 37)
- Place of birth: Jerez de la Frontera, Spain

Managerial career
- Years: Team
- 2011–2012: Xerez (youth)
- 2012–2013: Xerez B (assistant)
- 2013–2014: Sevilla C (assistant)
- 2014–2015: Xerez (youth)
- 2015–2018: Sevilla (youth)
- 2018–2019: Sevilla C (assistant)
- 2022: Ibiza (caretaker)
- 2023–2024: Alcorcón (assistant)
- 2024–2025: Eldense (assistant)

Carlos Sánchez Ruiz (born 16 January 1989) is a Spanish football psychologist, coach and scout.

== Career ==
Born in Jerez de la Frontera, Cádiz, Andalusia, Sánchez started his career with Xerez CD in 2011, as a sporting psychologist of the youth setup, while also being an assistant coach of the Juvenil B squad. He was an assistant of the reserves during the 2012–13 season, before joining Sevilla FC as an assistant of the C-team.

On 17 July 2014, Sánchez returned to Xerez after being appointed manager of the Juvenil side. He returned to Sevilla in the following year, being again an assistant of Paco Peña in the youth categories.

Sánchez was also an assistant of Peña back at the C-team during the 2018–19 season, before joining Real Valladolid on 15 June 2019, for their scouting team. On 11 January 2022, he was announced as the new technical analyst for Sergio at Cádiz CF.

In July 2022, Sánchez joined Segunda División side UD Ibiza as a technical secretary. On 26 November, he was named interim manager of the first team after Juan Antonio Anquela was sacked, and was in charge of the club in a 1–0 home loss against FC Andorra two days later; he then returned to his previous role after the appointment of Lucas Alcaraz as manager.

On 15 July 2023, Sánchez was announced as Fran Fernández's assistant at AD Alcorcón.
