= Hernán Pérez (footballer, born 1981) =

Spanish footballer and manager

Personal information
- Full name: Hernán Pérez Cuesta
- Date of birth: 2 October 1981 (age 45)
- Place of birth: Oviedo, Spain
- Height: 1.88 m (6 ft 2 in)
- Position: Midfielder

Team information
- Current team: Spain U17 (manager)

Youth career
- Oviedo

Senior career*
| Years | Team | Apps | (Gls) |
| 2000–2001 | Lealtad | 27 | (2) |
| 2001–2002 | Universidad Oviedo | 31 | (1) |
| 2002–2003 | Oviedo B | 34 | (2) |
| 2003–2004 | Lealtad | 22 | (0) |
| 2004 | Avilés | 14 | (0) |
| 2004–2005 | Oviedo ACF | 29 | (0) |
| 2005–2007 | Lealtad | 62 | (2) |
| 2007–2008 | Caudal | 30 | (4) |
| 2008–2011 | Covadonga | 80 | (1) |
| Total | | 317 | (12) |

Managerial career
- San Claudio (youth)
- Grujoan (youth)
- 2010–2012: Covadonga (youth)
- 2012–2014: Lealtad (assistant)
- 2014–2015: Oviedo (youth)
- 2015–2019: Langreo
- 2019–2020: Barakaldo
- 2020–2021: Unionistas
- 2021–2022: Real Madrid (youth)
- 2022: Lugo
- 2023–: Spain U17
- * Club domestic league appearances and goals

Hernán Pérez Cuesta (born 2 October 1981) is a Spanish football manager and former player who played as a midfielder, who is currently in charge of the Spain national under-17 team.

== Playing career ==
Born in Oviedo, Asturias, Pérez was a Real Oviedo youth graduate, but made his senior debut with Tercera División side CD Lealtad in the 2000–01 season. He moved to Segunda División B side CD Universidad de Oviedo in 2001, suffering relegation and subsequently returning to Oviedo to play for the reserves in the fourth tier.

In 2003, after the relegation of Oviedo's first team to the fourth division, the B-side disappeared and Pérez returned to Lealtad. In January of the following year, he signed for third tier side Real Avilés CF, again suffering relegation at the end of the season.

In 2005, after one season at fourth division side Oviedo ACF, Pérez rejoined Lealtad for a third spell. He left the club in August 2007 to join Caudal Deportivo also in division four, before moving to CD Covadonga in the same category in July 2008.

Pérez suffered relegation to the regional leagues with Covadonga in 2010, and retired in the following year at the age of just 30, as the club immediately returned to the fourth level.

== Coaching career ==
During his last season at Covadonga, Pérez was already managing the youth sides of the club; he had previously worked at hometown sides UD San Claudio and CD Grujoan. In July 2012, he returned to his former side Lealtad as an assistant manager.

In July 2014, Pérez rejoined another club he represented as a player, Oviedo, to work as a manager of the Juvenil squad. He left the side on 12 June 2015, after being named in charge of UP Langreo in the fourth division.

Pérez achieved promotion to the third division with the side in the 2017–18 campaign, and was appointed Barakaldo CF manager on 12 July 2019. He left the latter side on 14 May 2020, after both parties agreed to not renew his contract, and was named in charge of Unionistas de Salamanca CF also in the third level on 5 June.

Pérez departed Unionistas on 14 June 2021, after qualifying the team to the new third level called Primera División RFEF, and joined Real Madrid's structure on 1 July, after being named manager of the Juvenil side. He left the latter in June 2022, after winning the year's Copa del Rey Juvenil de Fútbol.

On 16 June 2022, Pérez was appointed manager of Segunda División side CD Lugo. On 21 November, after being knocked out in the first stage of the Copa del Rey, he was sacked.

On 13 July 2023, Pérez replaced Julen Guerrero at the helm of the Spain national under-17 team.

== Personal life ==
Pérez's younger brother Michu was also a footballer. A forward, he too was groomed at Oviedo; both worked together at Langreo in 2015–16.

== Managerial statistics ==
As of match played 31 October 2023

Managerial record by team and tenure
| Team | Nat | From | To | Record | | | | | | | | Ref |
| Team | Nat | From | To | G | W | D | L | GF | GA | GD | Win % | Ref |
|---|---|---|---|---|---|---|---|---|---|---|---|---|
| Langreo | (Spain) | 12 June 2015 | 30 May 2019 | 171 | 97 | 38 | 36 | 336 | 145 | +191 | 56.73 | |
| Barakaldo | (Spain) | 12 July 2019 | 14 May 2020 | 30 | 9 | 6 | 15 | 33 | 44 | −11 | 30.00 | |
| Unionistas | (Spain) | 5 June 2020 | 14 June 2021 | 26 | 12 | 7 | 7 | 27 | 19 | +8 | 46.15 | |
| Lugo | (Spain) | 16 June 2022 | 21 November 2022 | 17 | 3 | 5 | 9 | 15 | 24 | −9 | 17.65 | |
| Spain U17 | (Spain) | 13 July 2023 | Present | 6 | 4 | 0 | 2 | 21 | 10 | +11 | 66.67 | |
| Career total | | | | 250 | 125 | 56 | 69 | 432 | 242 | +190 | 50.00 | — |

== Honours ==
=== Manager ===
Real Madrid (youth)

- Copa del Rey Juvenil de Fútbol: 2022
