= Bulat Chagaev =

Bulat Chagaev is a Chechen businessman who formerly resided in Switzerland. He became widely known for his controversial acquisition and the subsequent bankruptcy of the Swiss football club Neuchâtel Xamax in 2011–2012.

== Biography ==
Due to his private lifestyle, little is known about Chagaev’s early biography. He was reportedly born in Chechnya to a family of Communist Party officials and graduated from the Grozny State Oil Technical University. He is married to Irina Zavgaeva, the daughter of Chechen politician Doku Zavgaev.

Since 1987 (according to other sources, since 1993), Chagaev has primarily lived in Switzerland. In 1991, he claimed to have purchased the Chechen football club FC Terek (now Akhmat Grozny), which he later dissolved due to the outbreak of war in Chechnya. In 1996, he was elected to the parliament of the Chechen Republic, though the body was soon disbanded by separatists. In 1997, Chagaev was reportedly linked to a financial scandal involving counterfeit payment orders known as avizo.

Between 2008 and 2010, Chagaev established four companies in Switzerland: Anvergure Management, Anvergure Trading, Anvergure Real Estate, and Dagmara Trading.

== Neuchâtel Xamax scandal ==
In April 2011 (according to some reports, in May), Chagaev purchased Swiss football club Neuchâtel Xamax, claiming that he was misled into believing the club had no debts. At the time, he also served as vice president of FC Terek and funded the grand opening of the Akhmat Arena stadium in Grozny, for which he received a state medal from Ramzan Kadyrov. However, he was dismissed from this post in September 2011 for failing to fulfill financial obligations.

After acquiring Neuchâtel Xamax, Chagaev became embroiled in conflicts with club staff and fans, partly due to attempts to introduce Chechen cultural elements and his proposal to rename the club "Xamax-Vainakh". The club soon fell into a deep financial crisis.

In January 2012, Neuchâtel Xamax was declared bankrupt, and Chagaev was arrested for allegedly forging a document from Bank of America indicating a credit line of $350 million.

== Legal proceedings and expulsion ==
After spending four months in custody, Chagaev was released on bail. In April 2013, Swiss authorities revoked his business visa and ordered his expulsion from the country.

In December 2016, the Criminal Court of the Canton of Neuchâtel convicted him of mismanagement, embezzlement, attempted fraud, and document forgery. He received a three‑year prison sentence, with 18 months suspended, two years probation, and ordered to pay fines and cover civil liabilities totalling ~CHF 40,000.

In January 2019, the Swiss Federal Supreme Court partially overturned the conviction, citing insufficient proof of the club’s debts, and returned the case to the lower court for further review.

On 17 December 2020, the Neuchâtel court reduced his prison sentence—from 36 to 30 months, with a year unconditional—but upheld the guilty verdict for negligent management.
