= Paco López (footballer) =

Spanish football manager (born 1967)

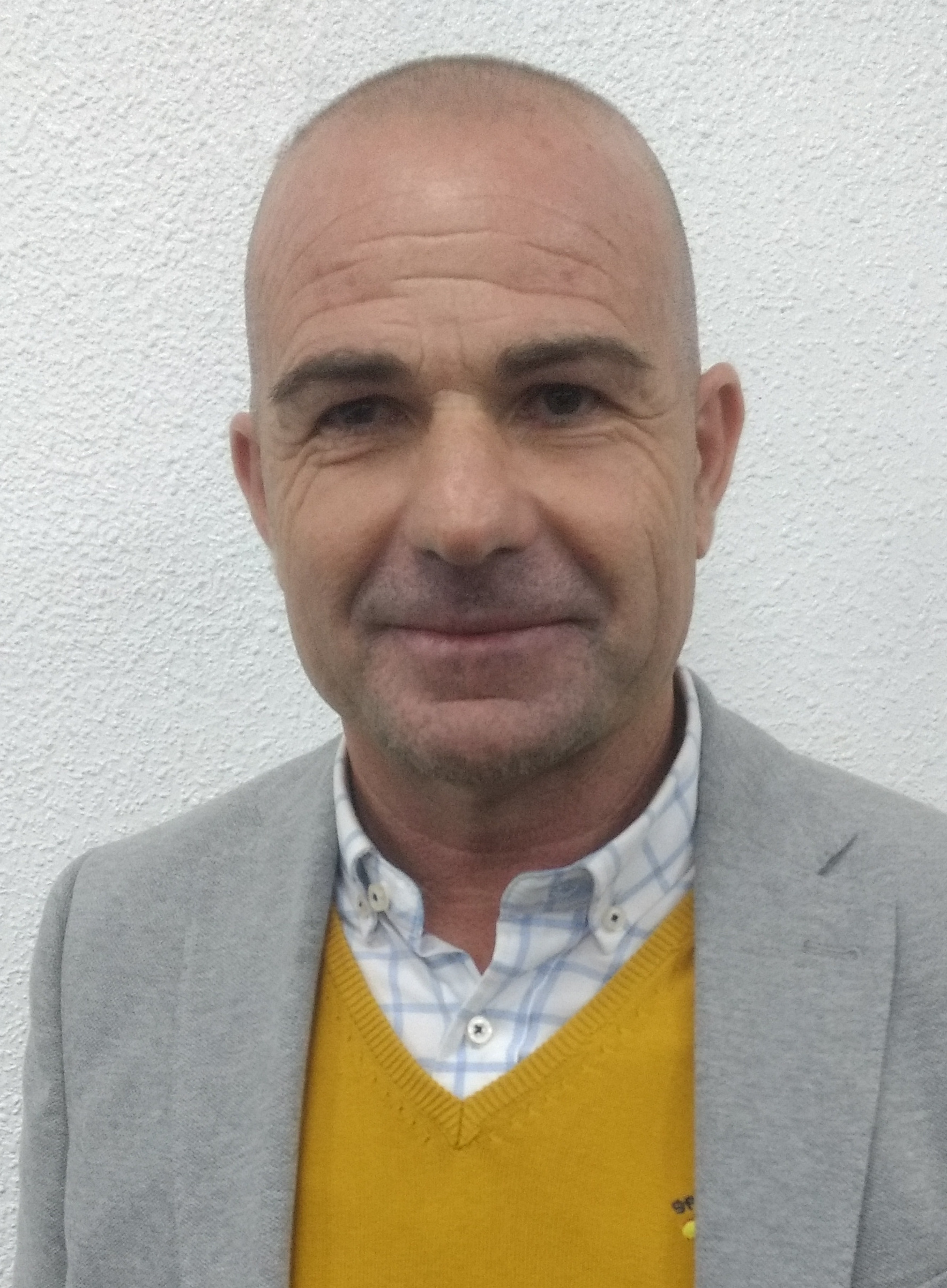
- López in 2019

Personal information
- Full name: Francisco José López Fernández
- Date of birth: 19 September 1967 (age 59)
- Place of birth: Silla, Spain
- Height: 1.70 m (5 ft 7 in)
- Position: Forward

Youth career
- Valencia

Senior career*
Years	Team	Apps	(Gls)
1985–1989	Valencia B		
1989	Carcaixent		
1989–1991	Torrent	34	(8)
1991–1994	Hércules	90	(23)
1994–1995	Extremadura	7	(1)
1995	Levante	16	(11)
1995–1998	Castellón	89	(28)
1998–1999	Murcia	29	(7)
1999–2002	Benidorm		

Managerial career
- 2004–2005: Villarreal C
- 2005–2008: Catarroja
- 2008–2009: Benidorm
- 2009–2011: Alcoyano
- 2011: Cartagena
- 2012–2013: Valencia B
- 2013–2014: Villarreal C
- 2014–2017: Villarreal B
- 2017–2018: Levante B
- 2018–2021: Levante
- 2022–2023: Granada
- 2024: Cádiz
- 2025: Leganés
- * Club domestic league appearances and goals

Francisco José "Paco" López Fernández (born 19 September 1967) is a Spanish football manager and former player who played as a forward.

In his playing career, he achieved Segunda División totals of 28 games and three goals for Hércules and Extremadura, but spent most of his years in the Segunda División B in service of six clubs.

As a manager, López worked mainly in the lower leagues, and spent three and a half years in charge of Levante in La Liga.

== Playing career ==
Born in Silla, Province of Valencia, López graduated from Valencia CF's youth setup. He made his senior debut with the reserves in the Tercera División.

In the summer of 1991, López joined Segunda División B club Hércules CF. After appearing regularly in the 1992–93 season, which ended in promotion, he played his first match as a professional on 19 September 1993, coming on as a second-half substitute in a 2–0 away loss against Real Burgos CF in the Segunda División.

López scored his first professional goal on 16 October 1993, his team's third in a 4–0 home win over Villarreal CF. In 1994, he moved to CF Extremadura also in the second tier.

After being sparingly played, López signed with division three side Levante UD in January 1995. In July, he moved to CD Castellón in the same league, and scored a career-best 16 goals in the 1997–98 campaign.

In 1998, López joined Real Murcia CF. At the end of the season, he dropped down to Tercera División and signed for Benidorm CF, eventually retiring at the age of 34.

== Coaching career ==
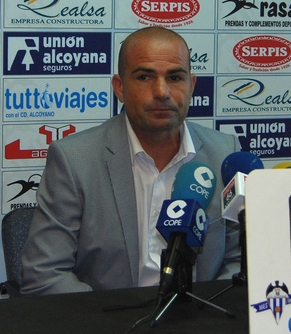
López as manager of Alcoyano in 2011

López started working as a manager in 2004, with Villarreal's third team. In July 2008, after three full seasons at Catarroja CF, he signed with a club he had represented as a player, Benidorm.

On 16 July 2009, López was appointed at CD Alcoyano also in the third division. He was dismissed on 11 April 2011, after falling from first to fourth in only five matches.

López joined division two club FC Cartagena on 27 May 2011. He was relieved of his duties on 19 September, after failing to collect one single point in the first four games.

López returned to Mestalla on 24 October 2012, replacing the fired Sergio Ventosa. On 17 June of the following year, having narrowly avoided relegation from the third tier, he left and returned to Villarreal C on 13 November.

On 22 May 2014, López was promoted to the reserves following the departure of Lluís Planagumà. On 22 June 2017, he moved to another reserve team, Atlético Levante UD also in the third division.

López was named manager of the main squad on 4 March 2018, after Juan Ramón Muñiz's dismissal. His first match in La Liga took place six days later, and he led his side to a 1–0 away win against Getafe CF.

López signed a one-year contract with an option for a further season on 8 May 2018, and five days later his team ended FC Barcelona's unbeaten league run by defeating the opposition 5–4 at home. In 2020–21, he led the Granotes to their first Copa del Rey semi-final after defeating Villarreal in the last minute of extra time; they lost that tie 3–2 on aggregate to Athletic Bilbao, in the same fashion.

On 4 October 2021, López was fired, having earned only four points from as many draws at the start of the season. He had managed a club record 133 top-flight games, and had a lower losses percentage in the division than any other Levante coach bar Joaquín Caparrós.

On 9 November 2022, after more than a year of inactivity, López replaced Aitor Karanka at the helm of second-division side Granada CF. He achieved promotion in his debut campaign as champions, but was dismissed on 26 November 2023 after a poor start to the new season.

López took over from Mauricio Pellegrino at Cádiz CF in June 2024; the Andalusians had just been relegated from the top tier. On 8 December, following three losses in one week and just 18 points from 18 matches, he was sacked.

On 10 June 2025, López was appointed manager of CD Leganés on a one-year deal. On 4 December, he was relieved of his duties.

== Managerial statistics ==
As of match played 4 December 2025

Managerial record by team and tenure
Team	Nat	From	To	Record								Ref
Team	Nat	From	To	G	W	D	L	GF	GA	GD	Win %	Ref
Villarreal C	(Spain)	30 June 2004	1 July 2005	34	23	7	4	66	17	+49	67.65	
Catarroja	(Spain)	1 July 2005	22 July 2008	126	53	29	44	155	141	+14	42.06	
Benidorm	(Spain)	22 July 2008	22 March 2009	34	10	13	11	36	32	+4	29.41	
Alcoyano	(Spain)	16 July 2009	11 April 2011	78	36	22	20	96	65	+31	46.15	
Cartagena	(Spain)	27 May 2011	19 September 2011	5	0	1	4	2	11	−9	0.00	
Valencia B	(Spain)	24 October 2012	17 June 2013	29	9	11	9	31	33	−2	31.03	
Villarreal C	(Spain)	13 November 2013	22 May 2014	25	12	5	8	37	22	+15	48.00	
Villarreal B	(Spain)	22 May 2014	25 May 2017	116	50	36	30	171	118	+53	43.10	
Levante B	(Spain)	22 June 2017	4 March 2018	30	18	8	4	53	23	+30	60.00	
Levante	(Spain)	4 March 2018	3 October 2021	147	49	41	57	207	221	−14	33.33	
Granada	(Spain)	9 November 2022	26 November 2023	44	19	9	16	65	55	+10	43.18	
Cádiz	(Spain)	1 June 2024	8 December 2024	20	5	6	9	24	29	−5	25.00	
Leganés	(Spain)	10 June 2025	4 December 2025	18	5	6	7	21	21	+0	27.78	
Total				706	289	194	223	964	788	+176	40.93	—

== Honours ==
Granada

- Segunda División: 2022–23
