= 2021–22 Granada CF season =

Granada CF
2021–22 season
- President: Rentao Yi
- Head coach: Robert Moreno (until 6 March); Rubén Torrecilla (caretaker, from 6 March to 18 April); Aitor Karanka (from 18 April)
- Stadium: Nuevo Los Cármenes
- La Liga: 18th (relegated)
- Copa del Rey: Second round
- Top goalscorer: League: Jorge Molina (10); All: Jorge Molina (12)
- Highest home attendance: 13,651 vs Getafe (28 October 2021)
- Lowest home attendance: 6,267 vs Valencia (21 August 2021)
- Biggest win: Mallorca 2–6 Granada
- Biggest defeat: Rayo Vallecano 4–0 Granada
Home colours	Away colours	Third colours

The 2021–22 season was the 88th season in the existence of Granada CF and the club's third consecutive season in the top flight of Spanish football. In addition to the domestic league, Granada participated in this season's edition of the Copa del Rey.

== Players ==
=== First-team squad ===
As of 2 February 2022

Note: Flags indicate national team as defined under FIFA eligibility rules; some limited exceptions apply. Players may hold more than one non-FIFA nationality.

No.	Pos.	Nation	Player
1	GK	POR	Luís Maximiano
2	DF	COL	Santiago Arias (on loan from Atlético Madrid)
3	DF	ESP	Sergio Escudero
4	MF	FRA	Maxime Gonalons
5	MF	ESP	Luis Milla
6	DF	ESP	Germán (vice-captain)
7	MF	ESP	Alberto Soro
8	MF	CMR	Yan Eteki
9	FW	COL	Luis Suárez
10	FW	ESP	Antonio Puertas
11	FW	VEN	Darwin Machís
12	FW	ESP	Dani Raba
13	GK	ESP	Aarón
14	FW	URU	Matías Arezo

No.	Pos.	Nation	Player
15	DF	ESP	Carlos Neva
16	DF	ESP	Víctor Díaz (captain)
17	DF	ESP	Quini
18	MF	SRB	Njegoš Petrović
19	MF	ESP	Ángel Montoro (3rd captain)
20	FW	COL	Carlos Bacca
21	MF	ESP	Rubén Rochina
22	DF	POR	Domingos Duarte
23	FW	ESP	Jorge Molina
24	MF	ALB	Myrto Uzuni
25	GK	POR	João Costa
26	MF	ESP	Isma Ruiz
27	DF	COL	Neyder Lozano
35	MF	ESP	Álex Collado (on loan from Barcelona)

=== Reserve team ===
Note: Flags indicate national team as defined under FIFA eligibility rules; some limited exceptions apply. Players may hold more than one non-FIFA nationality.

No.	Pos.	Nation	Player
27	DF	ESP	Pepe Sánchez
28	DF	ESP	Raúl Torrente
29	DF	ESP	Sergio Barcia

No.	Pos.	Nation	Player
30	GK	ESP	Ángel Jiménez
31	GK	SEN	Cheikh Kane Sarr (on loan from Gimnàstic)
34	MF	ESP	Bryan Zaragoza

=== Out on loan ===
Note: Flags indicate national team as defined under FIFA eligibility rules; some limited exceptions apply. Players may hold more than one non-FIFA nationality.

No.	Pos.	Nation	Player
—	DF	PER	Luis Abram (on loan at Cruz Azul until 30 June 2022)
—	DF	ESP	Adrián Marín (on loan at Famalicão until 30 June 2022)
—	DF	SEN	Alpha Diounkou (on loan at Barcelona B until 30 June 2022)
—	DF	ESP	Ricard Sánchez (on loan at Lugo until 30 June 2022)

No.	Pos.	Nation	Player
—	MF	ESP	Monchu (on loan at Valladolid until 30 June 2022)
—	FW	ESP	Antoñín (on loan at Málaga until 30 June 2022)
—	FW	ESP	Adrián Butzke (on loan at Paços Ferreira until 30 June 2022)

== Transfers ==
=== In ===
Date	Player	From	Type	Fee	Ref
30 June 2021	(Spain) Antoñín	Rayo Vallecano	Loan return		
30 June 2021	(Nigeria) Ramon Azeez	Cartagena	Loan return		
16 July 2021	(Spain) Monchu	Barcelona B	Transfer	Free	

=== Out ===
Date	Player	To	Type	Fee	Ref
30 June 2021	(Venezuela) Yangel Herrera	(England) Manchester City	Loan return		
30 June 2021	(Brazil) Kenedy	(England) Chelsea	Loan return		
30 June 2021	(Argentina) Nehuén Pérez	Atlético Madrid	Loan return		
30 June 2021	(Portugal) Domingos Quina	(England) Watford	Loan return		
30 June 2021	(Spain) Jesús Vallejo	Real Madrid	Loan return		
1 July 2021	(Portugal) Rui Silva	Real Betis	Transfer	Free	
1 July 2021	(Spain) Roberto Soldado	Levante	Transfer	€500k	

== Pre-season and friendlies ==
Win Draw Loss Fixtures

19 July 2021 Friendly	Granada	Cancelled	AFC	Málaga, Spain
20:00 CEST (UTC+2)

19 July 2021 Friendly	Granada	2–1	Bournemouth	Marbella, Spain
19:00 CEST (UTC+2)	Soro 27'; Suárez 58'	Report	Solanke 31'	Stadium: Marbella Football Center

27 July 2021 Friendly	Granada	1–1	Espanyol	Marbella, Spain
19:00 CEST (UTC+2)	Duarte 9'	Report	De Tomás 69'	Stadium: Marbella Football Center

28 July 2021 Friendly	Granada	0–1	Alcorcón	Marbella, Spain
19:00 CEST (UTC+2)		Report	Arribas 3'	Stadium: Marbella Football Center

2 August 2021 Friendly	Granada	3–0	Linense	Marbella, Spain
19:00 CEST (UTC+2)				Stadium: Marbella Football Center

6 August 2021 Friendly	Granada	3–1	Málaga	Granada, Spain
20:30 CEST (UTC+2)				Stadium: Nuevo Los Cármenes

7 August 2021 Friendly	Granada	Cancelled	Crotone	Marbella, Spain
18:00 CEST (UTC+2)				Stadium: Marbella Football Center

7 August 2021 Friendly	Granada	2–1	Linares Deportivo	Granada, Spain
19:00 CEST (UTC+2)	Puertas 82' (pen.); Marín 90'		Rodri 50'	Stadium: La Ciudad Deportiva GCF

25 March 2022 Friendly	Real Jaén	0–5	Granada	Jaén, Spain
19:30 CET (UTC+1)		Report	Puertas 50'; Eteki 72'; Sánchez 74'; Collado 80'; Arezo 87'	Stadium: Nuevo Estadio de La Victoria; Attendance: 300

== Competitions ==
=== Overall record ===
Competition	First match	Last match	Starting round	Final position	Record							
Competition	First match	Last match	Starting round	Final position	Pld	W	D	L	GF	GA	GD	Win %
La Liga	16 August 2021	22 May 2022	Matchday 1	18th	38	8	14	16	44	60	−16	21.05
Copa del Rey	30 November 2021	16 December 2021	First round	Second round	2	1	0	1	7	1	+6	50.00
Total					40	9	14	17	51	61	−10	22.50

Last updated: 22 May 2022
Source: Soccerway

=== La Liga ===
==== League table ====
Pos	Team	Pld	W	D	L	GF	GA	GD	Pts	Qualification or relegation
16	Mallorca	38	10	9	19	36	63	−27	39 (Note: Head-to-head points: Getafe 8, Mallorca 5, Cádiz 2.)	
17	Cádiz	38	8	15	15	35	51	−16	39	
18	Granada (R)	38	8	14	16	44	61	−17	38	Relegation to Segunda División
19	Levante (R)	38	8	11	19	51	76	−25	35	Relegation to Segunda División
20	Alavés (R)	38	8	7	23	31	65	−34	31	Relegation to Segunda División

Source: LaLiga Santander
Rules for classification: 1) Points; 2) Head-to-head points; 3) Head-to-head goal difference; 4) Goal difference; 5) Goals scored; 6) Fair-play points (Note: Head-to-head record is used only after all the matches between the teams in question have been played)
(R) Relegated

==== Results summary ====
Overall								Home						Away					
Pld	W	D	L	GF	GA	GD	Pts	W	D	L	GF	GA	GD	W	D	L	GF	GA	GD
38	8	14	16	44	60	−16	38	5	7	7	22	29	−7	3	7	9	22	31	−9

Last updated: 22 May 2022.
Source: La Liga

==== Results by round ====
Round	1	2	3	4	5	6	7	8	9	10	11	12	13	14	15	16	17	18	19	20	21	22	23	24	25	26	27	28	29	30	31	32	33	34	35	36	37	38
Ground	A	H	A	H	A	H	A	H	H	A	H	A	A	H	A	H	A	H	A	H	A	H	A	A	H	H	A	H	A	H	A	H	A	H	A	H	A	H
Result	D	D	L	L	D	L	L	W	W	D	D	W	L	L	D	W	D	W	D	D	L	L	L	L	L	D	L	L	W	D	L	L	D	D	W	W	L	D
Position	15	12	17	17	17	18	18	17	17	16	17	14	17	17	16	15	15	12	13	13	14	14	16	17	17	17	17	17	16	16	16	17	18	18	17	16	16	18

Updated to match(es) played on 22 May 2022. Source: La Liga
A = Away; H = Home; W = Win; D = Draw; L = Loss

==== Matches ====
The league fixtures were announced on 30 June 2021.

16 August 2021 1	Villarreal	0–0	Granada	Villarreal
20:00 CEST (UTC+2)	Foyth (yellow card) 21' (yellow-red card) 82'; Gerard (yellow card) 41'; Capoue (yellow card) 53'; Peña (yellow card) 85'	Report	Germán (yellow card) 71'	Stadium: Estadio de la Cerámica; Attendance: 7,837; Referee: Pablo González Fuertes
Note: Juan Foyth's first yellow card was overturned after Villarreal successfully appealed the decision.

21 August 2021 2	Granada	1–1	Valencia	Granada
19:30 CEST (UTC+2)	Suárez 16'; Monchu (yellow card) 45'; Duarte (yellow card) 45+3'; Germán (yellow card) 49'	Report	Alderete (yellow card) 65'; Correia (yellow card) 81'; Soler 88' (pen.)	Stadium: Nuevo Los Cármenes; Attendance: 6,267; Referee: Carlos del Cerro Grande

29 August 2021 3	Rayo Vallecano	4–0	Granada	Madrid
19:30 CEST (UTC+2)	Á. García 3'; Trejo 23' (pen.); Ciss (yellow card) 38'; Nteka 43'; Comesaña 58'	Report	Suárez (yellow card) 27'; Puertas (yellow card) 33'; Milla (yellow card) 33'; Quini (yellow card) 90+2'	Stadium: Campo de Fútbol de Vallecas; Attendance: 583; Referee: Jesús Gil Manzano

13 September 2021 4	Granada	1–2	Real Betis	Granada
22:00 CEST (UTC+2)	Suárez 66'; Gonalons (yellow card) 90+1'	Report	Iglesias (yellow card) 15'; Fekir (yellow card) 23'; Rodri 45+2'; Canales 89'	Stadium: Nuevo Los Cármenes; Attendance: 10,201; Referee: Guillermo Cuadra Fernández

20 September 2021 5	Barcelona	1–1	Granada	Barcelona
21:00 CEST (UTC+2)	Mingueza (yellow card) 77'; Araújo (yellow card) 88', (goal) 90'; Piqué (yellow card) 90+3'	Report	Duarte 2'; Montoro (yellow card) 40'; Gonalons (yellow card) 71'; Maximiano (yellow card) 86'; Monchu (yellow card) 87'; Quini (yellow card) 88'; Bacca (yellow card) 90+2'	Stadium: Camp Nou; Attendance: 27,097; Referee: Santiago Jaime Latre

23 September 2021 6	Granada	2–3	Real Sociedad	Granada
19:30 CEST (UTC+2)	Germán 9', (yellow card) 72'; Suárez (yellow card) 28'; Rochina (yellow card) 36'; Duarte (yellow card) 50'; Arias (yellow card) 64'; Milla 70' (pen.)	Report	Elustondo 52', 82'; Merino 60'; Le Normand (yellow card) 72'	Stadium: Nuevo Los Cármenes; Attendance: 9,552; Referee: Valentín Pizarro Gómez

27 September 2021 7	Celta Vigo	1–0	Granada	Vigo
21:00 CEST (UTC+2)	Méndez (yellow card) 12'; Aspas (penalty missed) 73', (yellow card) 90+6'; Suárez 90+4'	Report	Puertas (yellow card) 68'; Duarte (yellow card) 70'; Montoro (yellow card) 85'; Quini (yellow card) 90+6'; Neva (yellow card) 90+6'; Escandell (yellow card) 90+8'; Molina (yellow card) 90+9'	Stadium: Balaídos; Attendance: 6,375; Referee: César Soto Grado

3 October 2021 8	Granada	1–0	Sevilla	Granada
21:00 CEST (UTC+2)	Rochina 25'; Gonalons (yellow card) 28'; Quini (yellow card) 75'; Suárez (yellow card) 90+1'	Report	Diego Carlos (yellow card) 73' (yellow-red card) 90+1'; Acuña (yellow card) 75'; Ocampos (yellow card) 90+2'	Stadium: Nuevo Los Cármenes; Attendance: 12,334; Referee: Javier Alberola Rojas

22 October 2021 10	Osasuna	1–1	Granada	Pamplona
21:00 CEST (UTC+2)	Vidal (yellow card) 29'; Ávila 45'; José Ángel (red card) 74'	Report	Abram (yellow card) 37'; Bacca (yellow card) 48'; Rochina (yellow card) 50'; Montoro 90'	Stadium: El Sadar; Attendance: 21,128; Referee: Alejandro Muñiz Ruiz

28 October 2021 11	Granada	1–1	Getafe	Granada
20:00 CEST (UTC+2)	Montoro (yellow card) 45'; Suárez (penalty missed) 78'; Molina 90+7'	Report	Ünal 36', (yellow card) 77'; Nyom (yellow card) 60'; Maksimović (yellow card) 78'; Soria (yellow card) 80'	Stadium: Nuevo Los Cármenes; Attendance: 13,651; Referee: Adrián Cordero Vega

1 November 2021 12	Levante	0–3	Granada	Valencia
21:00 CET (UTC+1)	Malsa (yellow card) 25'; Bardhi (yellow card) 71'; Soldado (yellow card) 78'; Vukčević (yellow card) 83'	Report	Sánchez 7', (yellow card) 21'; Suárez 38'; Puertas 69'; Escudero (yellow card) 90'	Stadium: Ciutat de València; Attendance: 14,512; Referee: José María Sánchez Martínez

6 November 2021 13	Espanyol	2–0	Granada	Cornellà de Llobregat
14:00 CET (UTC+1)	Pedrosa 30'; De Tomás 42'; Bare (yellow card) 62'	Report	Díaz (yellow card) 64'	Stadium: RCDE Stadium; Attendance: 19,050; Referee: Isidro Díaz de Mera Escuderos

21 November 2021 14	Granada	1–4	Real Madrid	Granada
16:15 CET (UTC+1)	Suárez 34'; Montoro (yellow card) 62'; Monchu (red card) 67'	Report	Asensio 19'; Nacho 25'; Vinícius 56'; Mendy 76'; Isco (yellow card) 80'	Stadium: Nuevo Los Cármenes; Attendance: 17,460; Referee: Juan Martínez Munuera

26 November 2021 15	Athletic Bilbao	2–2	Granada	Bilbao
21:00 CET (UTC+1)	R. García 10'; Zarraga (yellow card) 62'; Maximiano 76' (o.g.); Martínez (red card) 90+9'	Report	Machís 25'; Molina 34'; Montoro (yellow card) 40'; Sánchez (yellow card) 77'	Stadium: San Mamés; Attendance: 32,651; Referee: Adrián Cordero Vega

3 December 2021 16	Granada	2–1	Alavés	Granada
21:00 CET (UTC+1)	Puertas 14'; Abram (yellow card) 40'; Eteki (yellow card) 79'; Arias 86'	Report	Laguardia (yellow card) 45+1'; Abram 81' (o.g.); López (yellow card) 86'	Stadium: Nuevo Los Cármenes; Attendance: 13,511; Referee: Javier Alberola Rojas

13 December 2021 17	Cádiz	1–1	Granada	Cádiz
21:00 CET (UTC+1)	Arzamendia 32'; Lozano (yellow card) 37'; Salvi (yellow card) 61' (yellow-red card) 90+2'; Cala (yellow card) 90+1'; Mauro (yellow card) 90+4'	Report	Molina 88'	Stadium: Nuevo Mirandilla; Attendance: 13,052; Referee: Miguel Ángel Ortiz Arias

19 December 2021 18	Granada	4–1	Mallorca	Granada
14:00 CET (UTC+1)	Milla (yellow card) 19'; Molina 20', 61', 90+1'; Gonalons (yellow card) 22'; Quini (yellow card) 50'; Puertas 90+6'	Report	Rodríguez 24'; Sedlar (yellow card) 47'; Baba (yellow card) 77'	Stadium: Nuevo Los Cármenes; Attendance: 13,014; Referee: Alejandro Muñiz Ruiz

22 December 2021 9	Granada	2–1	Atlético Madrid	Granada
19:00 CET (UTC+1)	Machís 17'; Molina 61'; Maximiano (yellow card) 66'; Ruiz (yellow card) 69'; Monchu (yellow card) 86'; Torrente (yellow card) 90+5'	Report	Félix 2'; De Paul (yellow card) 7'	Stadium: Nuevo Los Cármenes; Attendance: 13,034; Referee: Alejandro Hernández Hernández
Note: The match was originally scheduled for 17 October 2021, but was postponed for the 2022 FIFA World Cup qualification in South America due to postponed matches because of the COVID-19 pandemic and several players would not be able to return before the match.

2 January 2022 19	Elche	0–0	Granada	Elche
16:15 CET (UTC+1)	Fidel (yellow card) 45+4'; Pastore (yellow card) 45+5'; Morente (yellow card) 45+5'; González (red card) 47'	Report	Machís (yellow card) 45+6'; Suárez (yellow card) 45+8'; Quini (yellow card) 58'	Stadium: Estadio Manuel Martínez Valero; Attendance: 12,160; Referee: Adrián Cordero Vega

8 January 2022 20	Granada	1–1	Barcelona	Granada
18:30 CET (UTC+1)	Gonalons (yellow card) 31'; Puertas 89'; Bacca (yellow card) 90+3'	Report	Gavi (yellow card) 22' (yellow-red card) 79'; Lenglet (yellow card) 56'; L. de Jong 57'; Depay (yellow card) 69'; Ezzalzouli (yellow card) 83'	Stadium: Nuevo Los Cármenes; Attendance: 14,442; Referee: Pablo González Fuertes

20 January 2022 21	Getafe	4–2	Granada	Getafe
19:00 CET (UTC+1)	Sandro 10', (yellow card) 72'; Ünal (yellow card) 29', (goal) 48'; Maksimović 63'; Arambarri (yellow card) 86'; Mayoral 87'	Report	Suárez 13', 78'; Torrente (yellow card) 32'; Puertas (yellow card) 54'; Milla (yellow card) 67'; Molina (yellow card) 71'	Stadium: Coliseum Alfonso Pérez; Attendance: 7,634; Referee: Isidro Díaz de Mera Escuderos

23 January 2022 22	Granada	0–2	Osasuna	Granada
14:00 CET (UTC+1)		Report	Vidal (yellow card) 26'; D. García 64'; Brašanac (yellow card) 67'; K. García 90'	Stadium: Nuevo Los Cármenes; Attendance: 12,471; Referee: Santiago Jaime Latre

6 February 2022 23	Real Madrid	1–0	Granada	Madrid
21:00 CET (UTC+1)	Modrić (yellow card) 69'; Asensio 74', (yellow card) 75'	Report	Sánchez (yellow card) 90+2'	Stadium: Santiago Bernabéu; Attendance: 36,665; Referee: Antonio Mateu Lahoz

13 February 2022 24	Real Sociedad	2–0	Granada	San Sebastián
18:30 CET (UTC+1)	Oyarzabal 37' (pen.); Rafinha 74'	Report	Escudero (yellow card) 22'; Uzuni (yellow card) 26'	Stadium: Anoeta; Attendance: 29,847; Referee: Javier Alberola Rojas

19 February 2022 25	Granada	1–4	Villarreal	Granada
14:00 CET (UTC+1)	Sánchez (yellow card) 32'; Uzuni (yellow card) 34'; Milla 61' (pen.); Torrente (yellow card) 80'	Report	Lo Celso (yellow card) 34'; Danjuma 35' (pen.), 39', 81' (pen.); Estupiñán (yellow card) 45+4'; Aurier (yellow card) 60'; Chukwueze (yellow card) 68'; Asenjo (yellow card) 75'; Iborra (yellow card) 90+2'; Gómez 90+7'	Stadium: Nuevo Los Cármenes; Attendance: 13,389; Referee: Jesús Gil Manzano

28 February 2022 26	Granada	0–0	Cádiz	Granada
21:00 CET (UTC+1)	Duarte (red card) 33'; Sánchez (yellow card) 35'; Uzuni (yellow card) 42'; Torrente (yellow card) 79'	Report	Arzamendia (yellow card) 32'; Alcaraz (yellow card) 48'; San Emeterio (yellow card) 74'	Stadium: Nuevo Los Cármenes; Attendance: 14,785; Referee: José María Sánchez Martínez

5 March 2022 27	Valencia	3–1	Granada	Valencia
18:30 CET (UTC+1)	Cömert (yellow card) 27'; Musah (yellow card) 34'; Guedes 48'; Gómez 51'; Soler 62' (pen.); Marcos André (yellow card) 69'	Report	Doménech 56' (o.g.); Díaz (yellow card) 63'; Rochina (yellow card) 79'; Quini (yellow card) 88'	Stadium: Mestalla; Attendance: 31,227; Referee: Valentín Pizarro Gómez

12 March 2022 28	Granada	0–1	Elche	Granada
16:15 CET (UTC+1)	Torrente (yellow card) 38'; Quini (yellow card) 54'; Petrović (yellow card) 56'	Report	Fidel 11', (yellow card) 82'; Boyé (yellow card) 33'; Roco (yellow card) 50'; Gumbau (yellow card) 65'; Mojica (yellow card) 70'; Olaza (yellow card) 88'	Stadium: Nuevo Los Cármenes; Attendance: 15,345; Referee: Carlos del Cerro Grande

19 March 2022 29	Alavés	2–3	Granada	Vitoria-Gasteiz
14:00 CET (UTC+1)	Loum (yellow card) 4'; Joselu (penalty missed) 26'; Tenaglia (yellow card) 41'; Escalante 52', (yellow card) 90+6'; Vallejo 57'; De la Fuente (yellow card) 90'	Report	Quini (yellow card) 27'; Uzuni (yellow card) 45+3'; Escudero 50', (yellow card) 90+8'; Petrović (yellow card) 61'; Puertas 77'; Suárez 87'; Sánchez (yellow card) 90'; Díaz (yellow card) 90+8'; Aarón (red card) 90+8'	Stadium: Mendizorrotza; Attendance: 16,209; Referee: Guillermo Cuadra Fernández

3 April 2022 30	Granada	2–2	Rayo Vallecano	Granada
18:30 CEST (UTC+2)	Petrović (yellow card) 8'; Milla (yellow card) 23', (goal) 90+3' (pen.); Collado (yellow card) 45+3'; Molina 67'; Arezo (yellow card) 88'	Report	Catena 6', (yellow card) 90+3'; Guardiola 17', (yellow card) 57'; Comesaña (yellow card) 49' (yellow-red card) 51'; Hernández (yellow card) 90+5'	Stadium: Nuevo Los Cármenes; Attendance: 15,823; Referee: Alejandro Hernández Hernández

8 April 2022 31	Sevilla	4–2	Granada	Seville
21:00 CEST (UTC+2)	Diego Carlos 32'; Jordán (yellow card) 57'; Ocampos 68'; Mir (yellow card) 78', (goal) 90+3'; Gómez 90+9'	Report	Machís 23'; Eteki (yellow card) 42'; Suárez (yellow card) 76'; Díaz 88'	Stadium: Ramón Sánchez Pizjuán; Attendance: 33,504; Referee: Miguel Ángel Ortiz Arias

17 April 2022 32	Granada	1–4	Levante	Granada
14:00 CEST (UTC+2)	Díaz (yellow card) 35'; Sánchez (yellow card) 44' (yellow-red card) 54'; Petrović (yellow card) 69'; Machís (yellow card) 74'; Collado 90+2'	Report	Gómez 17'; Radoja (yellow card) 40'; Morales 56' (pen.); Malsa 77'; Cárdenas (yellow card) 79'; Soldado 90+5'	Stadium: Nuevo Los Cármenes; Attendance: 15,323; Referee: Valentín Pizarro Gómez

20 April 2022 33	Atlético Madrid	0–0	Granada	Madrid
19:00 CEST (UTC+2)	Mandava (yellow card) 29'; Savić (yellow card) 45+4'; De Paul (yellow card) 78'; Vrsaljko (yellow card) 85'	Report	Quini (yellow card) 3'; Escudero (yellow card) 58'; Díaz (yellow card) 74'; Puertas (yellow card) 83'; Duarte (yellow card) 90+2'	Stadium: Wanda Metropolitano; Attendance: 43,517; Referee: Jesús Gil Manzano

1 May 2022 34	Granada	1–1	Celta Vigo	Granada
16:15 CEST (UTC+2)	Molina (yellow card) 90+1'; Machís 90+2'	Report	Galán (yellow card) 30'; Beltrán (yellow card) 48'; Dituro (yellow card) 53'; Aspas 72'	Stadium: Nuevo Los Cármenes; Attendance: 15,036; Referee: Juan Martínez Munuera

7 May 2022 35	Mallorca	2–6	Granada	Palma
14:00 CEST (UTC+2)	Sevilla 28'; Raíllo (yellow card) 45+1', (goal) 58'; Maffeo (yellow card) 45+4'; Valjent (yellow card) 67'	Report	Suárez 6'; Escudero 46'; Puertas 55'; Duarte (yellow card) 60'; Molina 69', 90'; Uzuni 78'; Petrović (yellow card) 83'	Stadium: Visit Mallorca Stadium; Attendance: 18,466; Referee: Ricardo de Burgos Bengoetxea

10 May 2022 36	Granada	1–0	Athletic Bilbao	Granada
20:00 CEST (UTC+2)	Collado 35'; Quini (yellow card) 41'; Escudero (yellow card) 77'; Duarte (yellow card) 88'; Eteki (yellow card) 90+2'	Report	Vesga (yellow card) 72' (yellow-red card) 85'	Stadium: Nuevo Los Cármenes; Attendance: 16,638; Referee: José María Sánchez Martínez

15 May 2022 37	Real Betis	2–0	Granada	Seville
19:30 CEST (UTC+2)	Juanmi 14', 89'	Report	Suárez (yellow card) 90+1'	Stadium: Benito Villamarín; Attendance: 45,016; Referee: Ricardo de Burgos Bengoetxea

22 May 2022 38	Granada	0–0	Espanyol	Granada
20:00 CEST (UTC+2)	Molina (penalty missed) 72'; Escudero (yellow card) 87'	Report		Stadium: Nuevo Los Cármenes; Attendance: 17,951; Referee: Alejandro Hernández Hernández

=== Copa del Rey ===
30 November 2021 First round	Laguna	0–7	Granada	Santa Cruz de Tenerife
19:00 CET (UTC+1)	El Hallal (yellow card) 45'; Dávila (yellow card) 46'	Report	Bacca 9'; Butzke 32', 44', 54'; Puertas 41'; Molina 67', 76'; Zaragoza (yellow card) 70'	Stadium: Heliodoro Rodríguez López (Note: Laguna played its game at Heliodoro Rodríguez López, in Santa Cruz de Tenerife instead of their regular stadium Francisco Peraza in San Cristóbal de La Laguna as it does not meet the requirements established by the Royal Spanish Football Federation.); Referee: Valentín Pizarro Gómez

16 December 2021 Second round	Atlético Mancha Real	1–0	Granada	Mancha Real
21:00 CET (UTC+1)	José Enrique 21'	Report		Stadium: La Juventud; Referee: César Soto Grado

== Statistics ==
=== Goalscorers ===
As of 22 May 2022

Rank	Player	La Liga	Copa del Rey	Total
1	(Spain) Jorge Molina	10	2	12
2	(Colombia) Luis Suárez	8	0	8
3	(Spain) Antonio Puertas	6	1	7
4	(Venezuela) Darwin Machís	4	0	4
5	(Spain) Adrián Butzke	0	3	3
5	(Spain) Luis Milla	3	0	3
7
7	(Spain) Álex Collado	2	0	2
7	(Spain) Germán Sánchez	2	0	2
7	(Spain) Sergio Escudero	2	0	2
10
10	(Colombia) Santiago Arias	1	0	1
10	(Colombia) Carlos Bacca	0	1	1
10	(Spain) Víctor Díaz	1	0	1
10	(Portugal) Domingos Duarte	1	0	1
10	(Spain) Ángel Montoro	1	0	1
10	(Spain) Rubén Rochina	1	0	1
10	(Albania) Myrto Uzuni	1	0	1
Own goals		1	0	1
Total		44	7	45
