= 2020–21 Granada CF season =

Granada
2020–21 season
- President: Jiang Lizhang (until 23 December); Rentao Yi (from 23 December)
- Head coach: Diego Martínez
- Stadium: Nuevo Los Cármenes
- La Liga: 9th
- Copa del Rey: Quarter-finals
- UEFA Europa League: Quarter-finals
- Top goalscorer: League: Roberto Soldado (9); All: Jorge Molina (15)
- Biggest win: Navalcarnero 0–6 Granada
- Biggest defeat: Atlético Madrid 6–1 Granada
| Home colours | Away colours | Third colours |

The 2020–21 season was the 87th season in the existence of Granada CF and the club's second consecutive season in the top flight of Spanish football. In addition to the domestic league, Granada participated in this season's editions of the Copa del Rey and the UEFA Europa League. The season covered the period from 20 July 2020 to 30 June 2021, with the late start to the season due to the COVID-19 pandemic in Spain.

== Players ==
=== First-team squad ===
As of 1 February 2021

Note: Flags indicate national team as defined under FIFA eligibility rules; some limited exceptions apply. Players may hold more than one non-FIFA nationality.

| No. | Pos. | Nation | Player |
|---|---|---|---|
| 1 | GK | POR | Rui Silva |
| 2 | DF | GLP | Dimitri Foulquier |
| 3 | DF | ARG | Nehuén Pérez (on loan from Atlético Madrid) |
| 4 | MF | FRA | Maxime Gonalons |
| 5 | MF | ESP | Luis Milla |
| 6 | DF | ESP | Germán (vice-captain) |
| 7 | FW | COL | Luis Suárez |
| 8 | MF | CMR | Yan Eteki |
| 9 | FW | ESP | Roberto Soldado (3rd captain) |
| 10 | FW | ESP | Antonio Puertas |
| 11 | FW | VEN | Darwin Machís |
| 12 | MF | POR | Domingos Quina (on loan from Watford) |
| 13 | GK | ESP | Aarón |

| No. | Pos. | Nation | Player |
|---|---|---|---|
| 14 | MF | ESP | Fede Vico |
| 15 | DF | ESP | Carlos Neva |
| 16 | DF | ESP | Víctor Díaz (captain) |
| 17 | DF | ESP | Quini |
| 18 | DF | ESP | Adrián Marín |
| 19 | MF | ESP | Ángel Montoro (4th captain) |
| 20 | DF | ESP | Jesús Vallejo (on loan from Real Madrid) |
| 21 | MF | VEN | Yangel Herrera (on loan from Manchester City) |
| 22 | DF | POR | Domingos Duarte |
| 23 | FW | ESP | Jorge Molina |
| 24 | MF | BRA | Kenedy (on loan from Chelsea) |
| 26 | MF | ESP | Alberto Soro |

=== Reserve team ===
Note: Flags indicate national team as defined under FIFA eligibility rules; some limited exceptions apply. Players may hold more than one non-FIFA nationality.

| No. | Pos. | Nation | Player |
|---|---|---|---|
| 27 | MF | ESP | Antonio Aranda |
| 28 | DF | ESP | Pepe Sánchez |
| 29 | MF | ESP | Isma Ruiz |
| 30 | DF | ESP | Raúl Torrente |
| 31 | GK | ESP | Arnau Fàbrega |
| 33 | FW | ESP | Echu |
| 35 | GK | POR | João Costa |
| 36 | MF | ARG | Juan Ignacio Brunet |

| No. | Pos. | Nation | Player |
|---|---|---|---|
| 37 | MF | ESP | Álvaro Bravo |
| 38 | FW | ESP | Dani Plomer |
| 39 | MF | KOS | Eris Abedini |
| 40 | DF | ESP | Carlos León |
| 41 | GK | ESP | Ángel Jiménez |
| 42 | DF | ESP | Sergio Barcia |
| 43 | GK | ESP | Rafael Romero |
| 44 | DF | GHA | Kingsley Fobi |

=== Out on loan ===
Note: Flags indicate national team as defined under FIFA eligibility rules; some limited exceptions apply. Players may hold more than one non-FIFA nationality.

| No. | Pos. | Nation | Player |
|---|---|---|---|
| — | MF | NGR | Ramon Azeez (at Cartagena until 30 June 2021) |
| — | FW | ESP | Antoñín (at Rayo Vallecano until 30 June 2021) |

== Transfers ==
=== In ===
| Date | Player | From | Type | Fee | Ref |
|---|---|---|---|---|---|
| 30 June 2020 | (Spain) José Antonio González | Córdoba | Loan return | | |
| 21 July 2020 | (Spain) Bernardo Cruz | Numancia | Loan return | | |
| 4 August 2020 | (Guadeloupe) Dimitri Foulquier | (England) Watford | Buyout clause | €2M | |
| 4 August 2020 | (Spain) Luis Milla | Tenerife | Transfer | €5M | |
| 7 August 2020 | (France) Maxime Gonalons | (Italy) Roma | Buyout clause | €4M | |
| 18 August 2020 | (Spain) Jesús Vallejo | Real Madrid | Loan | | |
| 25 August 2020 | (Spain) Jorge Molina | Getafe | Transfer | Free | |
| 8 September 2020 | (Brazil) Kenedy | (England) Chelsea | Loan | | |
| 1 February 2021 | (Spain) Adrián Marín | Alavés | Transfer | Undisclosed | |
| 1 February 2021 | (Portugal) Domingos Quina | (England) Watford | Loan | | |

=== Out ===
| Date | Player | To | Type | Fee | Ref |
|---|---|---|---|---|---|
| 20 July 2020 | (Portugal) Gil Dias | (France) Monaco | Loan return | | |
| 20 July 2020 | (Spain) Carlos Fernández | Sevilla | Loan return | | |
| 20 July 2020 | (Venezuela) Yangel Herrera | (England) Manchester City | Loan return | | |
| 20 July 2020 | (Spain) José Antonio Martínez | Eibar | Loan return | | |
| 20 July 2020 | (Spain) Jesús Vallejo | Real Madrid | Loan return | | |
| 4 August 2020 | (Spain) José Antonio González | Recreativo | Transfer | Free | |
| 4 August 2020 | (Spain) Álvaro Vadillo | Celta Vigo | Transfer | Free | |
| 1 February 2021 | (Nigeria) Ramon Azeez | Cartagena | Loan | | |

== Pre-season and friendlies ==
Win Draw Loss

| 28 August 2020 Friendly | Granada | 0–3 | Valladolid | Marbella, Spain |
| 19:00 CEST (UTC+2) | | | Gassama 53'; Toni 59', 73' | Stadium: Marbella Football Center |

| 30 August 2020 Friendly | Málaga | 0–0 | Granada | San Pedro de Alcántara, Spain |
| 19:00 CEST (UTC+2) | | Report | | Stadium: Marbella Football Center; Referee: José Luis Guzmán Mansilla |

| 4 September 2020 Friendly | Granada | Cancelled | Cádiz | San Pedro de Alcántara, Spain |
| 19:30 CEST (UTC+2) | | | | Stadium: Marbella Football Center |

| 5 September 2020 Friendly | Real Betis | 3–2 | Granada | Marbella, Spain |
| 19:30 CEST (UTC+2) | Iglesias 47'; Bartra 80'; Juanmi 88' | | Montoro 51'; Antoñín 90+1' | Stadium: Estadio Municipal de Marbella; Attendance: 0 |

== Competitions ==
=== Overall record ===
| Competition | First match | Last match | Starting round | Final position | Record | | | | | | | |
| Competition | First match | Last match | Starting round | Final position | Pld | W | D | L | GF | GA | GD | Win % |
|---|---|---|---|---|---|---|---|---|---|---|---|---|
| La Liga | 12 September 2020 | 23 May 2021 | Matchday 1 | 9th | 38 | 13 | 7 | 18 | 47 | 65 | −18 | 34.21 |
| Copa del Rey | 17 December 2020 | 3 February 2021 | First round | Quarter-finals | 5 | 4 | 0 | 1 | 15 | 7 | +8 | 80.00 |
| UEFA Europa League | 17 September 2020 | 15 April 2021 | Second qualifying round | Quarter-finals | 15 | 8 | 2 | 5 | 21 | 12 | +9 | 53.33 |
| Total | | | | | 58 | 25 | 9 | 24 | 83 | 84 | −1 | 43.10 |

Source: Soccerway

=== La Liga ===
==== League table ====
| Pos | Team | Pld | W | D | L | GF | GA | GD | Pts | Qualification or relegation |
|---|---|---|---|---|---|---|---|---|---|---|
| 7 | Villarreal | 38 | 15 | 13 | 10 | 60 | 44 | +16 | 58 | Qualification for the Champions League group stage (Note: Villarreal qualified for the 2021–22 UEFA Champions League by winning the 2020–21 UEFA Europa League. Based on their league position (7th), they would have received the spot above to enter the Europa Conference League play-off round. This spot was vacated without replacement as per UEFA regulations.) |
| 8 | Celta Vigo | 38 | 14 | 11 | 13 | 55 | 57 | −2 | 53 | |
| 9 | Granada | 38 | 13 | 7 | 18 | 47 | 65 | −18 | 46 (Note: Granada finished ahead of Athletic Bilbao on head-to-head goal difference: Granada 2–0 Athletic Bilbao, Athletic Bilbao 2–1 Granada.) | |
| 10 | Athletic Bilbao | 38 | 11 | 13 | 14 | 46 | 42 | +4 | 46 | |
| 11 | Osasuna | 38 | 11 | 11 | 16 | 37 | 48 | −11 | 44 (Note: Osasuna finished ahead of Cádiz on head-to-head points: Cádiz 0–2 Osasuna, Osasuna 3–2 Cádiz.) | |

Source: La Liga
Rules for classification: 1) Points; 2) Head-to-head points; 3) Head-to-head goal difference; 4) Goal difference; 5) Goals scored; 6) Fair-play points (Note: Head-to-head record is used only after all the matches between the teams in question have been played)

==== Results summary ====
| Overall | | | | | | | | Home | | | | | | Away | | | | | |
| Pld | W | D | L | GF | GA | GD | Pts | W | D | L | GF | GA | GD | W | D | L | GF | GA | GD |
|---|---|---|---|---|---|---|---|---|---|---|---|---|---|---|---|---|---|---|---|
| 38 | 13 | 7 | 18 | 47 | 65 | −18 | 46 | 9 | 4 | 6 | 25 | 25 | 0 | 4 | 3 | 12 | 22 | 40 | −18 |

Source: La Liga

==== Results by round ====
| Round | 1 | 2 | 3 | 4 | 5 | 6 | 7 | 8 | 9 | 10 | 11 | 12 | 13 | 14 | 15 | 16 | 17 | 18 | 19 | 20 | 21 | 22 | 23 | 24 | 25 | 26 | 27 | 28 | 29 | 30 | 31 | 32 | 33 | 34 | 35 | 36 | 37 | 38 |
|---|---|---|---|---|---|---|---|---|---|---|---|---|---|---|---|---|---|---|---|---|---|---|---|---|---|---|---|---|---|---|---|---|---|---|---|---|---|---|
| Ground | H | H | A | H | A | H | A | H | A | H | A | H | A | H | A | H | A | H | A | H | H | A | H | A | H | A | H | A | H | A | H | A | A | H | A | H | A | H |
| Result | W | W | L | W | D | W | W | D | L | L | L | D | W | W | L | W | L | L | D | L | D | D | L | L | W | L | W | L | L | W | W | L | W | L | L | L | L | D |
| Position | 3 | 1 | 2 | 9 | 10 | 6 | 3 | 6 | 5 | 6 | 8 | 7 | 6 | 6 | 7 | 7 | 7 | 7 | 7 | 7 | 8 | 8 | 8 | 9 | 8 | 10 | 8 | 8 | 9 | 8 | 8 | 8 | 8 | 8 | 10 | 10 | 11 | 9 |

Source: La Liga
A = Away; H = Home; W = Win; D = Draw; L = Loss

==== Matches ====
The league fixtures were announced on 31 August 2020.

| 12 September 2020 1 | Granada | 2–0 | Athletic Bilbao | Granada |
| 18:30 CEST (UTC+2) | Herrera (yellow card) 10', (goal) 49'; Germán (yellow card) 45'; Milla 53'; Gonalons (yellow card) 90+2' | Report | Morcillo (yellow card) 15'; Martínez (yellow card) 52'; López (yellow card) 72'; Yeray (yellow card) 84' | Stadium: Nuevo Los Cármenes; Attendance: 0 (Note: The match was played behind closed doors due to the COVID-19 pandemic in Spain.); Referee: Antonio Mateu Lahoz |

| 20 September 2020 2 | Granada | 2–1 | Alavés | Granada |
| 18:30 CEST (UTC+2) | Soldado 7'; Machís 79' | Report | Joselu 22'; Méndez (yellow card) 24'; Battaglia (yellow card) 26'; Lejeune (yellow card) 49' | Stadium: Nuevo Los Cármenes; Attendance: 0 Referee: Carlos del Cerro Grande |

| 27 September 2020 3 | Atlético Madrid | 6–1 | Granada | Madrid |
| 16:00 CEST (UTC+2) | Costa 9'; Félix (yellow card) 27', (goal) 65'; Correa 47'; Saúl (penalty missed) 16', (yellow card) 59'; Llorente 73'; Thomas (yellow card) 74'; Suárez 85', 90+4' | Report | Duarte (yellow card) 15'; Molina 87' | Stadium: Metropolitano Stadium; Attendance: 0 Referee: Xavier Estrada Fernández |

| 4 October 2020 5 | Cádiz | 1–1 | Granada | Cádiz |
| 18:30 CEST (UTC+2) | José Mari (yellow card) 45'; Alejo 48'; Espino (yellow card) 60' | Report | Germán 27', (yellow card) 53'; Kenedy (yellow card) 56' | Stadium: Estadio Ramón de Carranza; Attendance: 0 Referee: Javier Alberola Rojas |

| 17 October 2020 6 | Granada | 1–0 | Sevilla | Granada |
| 13:00 CEST (UTC+2) | Gonalons (yellow card) 30'; Foulquier (yellow card) 40'; Puertas (yellow card) 71'; Herrera 82'; Vico (yellow card) 85' | Report | Fernando (yellow card) 10'; Jordán (yellow card) 45+3' (yellow-red card) 45+4'; Vázquez (yellow card) 90+1' | Stadium: Nuevo Los Cármenes; Attendance: 0 Referee: Pablo González Fuertes |

| 25 October 2020 7 | Getafe | 0–1 | Granada | Getafe |
| 18:30 CET (UTC+1) | Mata (yellow card) 12'; Olivera (yellow card) 22'; Djené (yellow card) 45'; Ünal (yellow card) 89' | Report | Germán (yellow card) 39'; Montoro 45+2' (pen.); Herrera (yellow card) 90+1' | Stadium: Coliseum Alfonso Pérez; Attendance: 0 Referee: Jesús Gil Manzano |

| 1 November 2020 8 | Granada | 1–1 | Levante | Granada |
| 18:30 CET (UTC+1) | Machís 8'; Gonalons (red card) 16'; Germán (yellow card) 68'; Suárez (yellow card) 69' | Report | Vezo 34', (yellow card) 61'; Malsa (yellow card) 35'; Postigo (yellow card) 47' | Stadium: Nuevo Los Cármenes; Attendance: 0 Referee: Santiago Jaime Latre |

| 8 November 2020 9 | Real Sociedad | 2–0 | Granada | San Sebastián |
| 16:15 CET (UTC+1) | Merino (yellow card) 19'; Monreal 22'; Oyarzabal 27' (pen.); Willian José (penalty missed) 54'; Le Normand (red card) 86'; Silva (yellow card) 90+4' | Report | Barcia (yellow card) 80'; Machís (penalty missed) 90+5' | Stadium: Anoeta; Attendance: 0 Referee: Carlos del Cerro Grande |

| 22 November 2020 10 | Granada | 1–3 | Valladolid | Granada |
| 18:30 CET (UTC+1) | Gonalons (yellow card) 37'; Neva (yellow card) 39'; Duarte 63'; Montoro (yellow card) 71'; Suárez (yellow card) 90+3' | Report | Fede (yellow card) 45'; Plano 45+2'; Marcos André 53'; Janko (yellow card) 69'; Jota (yellow card) 88', (goal) 90' | Stadium: Nuevo Los Cármenes; Attendance: 0 Referee: David Medié Jiménez |

| 29 November 2020 11 | Celta Vigo | 3–1 | Granada | Vigo |
| 18:30 CET (UTC+1) | Murillo (yellow card) 21'; Nolito 27'; Tapia (yellow card) 45+1'; Baeza 81'; Beltrán 85'; Olaza (yellow card) 90+2'; Mallo (yellow card) 90+6'; Yokuşlu (yellow card) 90+6', (red card) 90+8' | Report | Suárez 25'; Foulquier (yellow card) 53'; Puertas (yellow card) 90+2'; Soldado (yellow card) 90+5' | Stadium: Balaídos; Attendance: 0 Referee: Isidro Díaz de Mera |

| 6 December 2020 12 | Granada | 3–3 | Huesca | Granada |
| 14:00 CET (UTC+1) | Foulquier (yellow card) 31'; Suárez 43'; Germán (yellow card) 56', (goal) 90'; Molina 88' | Report | Rico 21'; García 49'; Okazaki 82' | Stadium: Nuevo Los Cármenes; Attendance: 0 Referee: Javier Alberola Rojas |

| 13 December 2020 13 | Elche | 0–1 | Granada | Elche |
| 18:30 CET (UTC+1) | Josema (yellow card) 10'; Sánchez (yellow card) 48'; González (yellow card) 73'; Barragán (yellow card) 90+3' | Report | Suárez 42'; Gonalons (yellow card) 86'; Puertas (yellow card) 90+4' | Stadium: Estadio Manuel Martínez Valero; Attendance: 0 Referee: Pablo González Fuertes |

| 20 December 2020 14 | Granada | 2–0 | Real Betis | Granada |
| 16:15 CET (UTC+1) | Herrera (yellow card) 9'; Soldado 14' (pen.), 20', (yellow card) 15'; Gonalons (yellow card) 30' | Report | Rodríguez (yellow card) 11'; Emerson (yellow card) 67'; Fekir (yellow card) 87' | Stadium: Nuevo Los Cármenes; Attendance: 0 Referee: José María Sánchez Martínez |

| 23 December 2020 15 | Real Madrid | 2–0 | Granada | Madrid |
| 19:45 CET (UTC+1) | Vázquez (yellow card) 17'; Casemiro 57'; Carvajal (yellow card) 81'; Benzema 90+4' | Report | Foulquier (yellow card) 27' | Stadium: Alfredo Di Stéfano; Attendance: 0 Referee: Juan Martínez Munuera |

| 30 December 2020 16 | Granada | 2–1 | Valencia | Granada |
| 17:00 CET (UTC+1) | Foulquier (yellow card) 16'; Herrera (yellow card) 40'; Kenedy 45+3'; Puertas (yellow card) 72'; Duarte (red card) 76'; Molina 88'; Gonalons (yellow card) 90+5' | Report | Jason (yellow card) 9' (yellow-red card) 70'; Wass (yellow card) 33'; Gameiro 36'; Mangala (yellow card) 48'; Guedes (red card) 73' | Stadium: Nuevo Los Cármenes; Attendance: 0 Referee: Adrián Cordero Vega |

| 3 January 2021 17 | Eibar | 2–0 | Granada | Eibar |
| 18:30 CET (UTC+1) | Diop (yellow card) 4'; Expósito (yellow card) 27', (penalty missed) 55'; Gil 55', 76' | Report | Germán (yellow card) 40' | Stadium: Ipurua; Attendance: 0 Referee: Antonio Mateu Lahoz |

| 9 January 2021 18 | Granada | 0–4 | Barcelona | Granada |
| 18:30 CET (UTC+1) | Soldado (yellow card) 45'; Suárez (yellow card) 74'; Vallejo (red card) 78' | Report | Griezmann 12', 63'; Messi 35', 42'; Mingueza (yellow card) 49'; Busquets (yellow card) 82'; Alba (yellow card) 87' | Stadium: Nuevo Los Cármenes; Attendance: 0 Referee: Ricardo de Burgos Bengoetxea |

| 12 January 2021 4 | Granada | 2–0 | Osasuna | Granada |
| 19:00 CET (UTC+1) | Suárez 22'; Machís 45+1'; Duarte (yellow card) 90' | Report | Oier (yellow card) 36'; R. García (yellow card) 40'; D. García (yellow card) 67'; Gallego (yellow card) 76' | Stadium: Nuevo Los Cármenes; Attendance: 0 Referee: Pablo González Fuertes |
Note: The match originally scheduled for 30 September 2020, but postponed due to Granada's involvement in the UEFA Europa League.

| 20 January 2021 19 | Villarreal | 2–2 | Granada | Villarreal |
| 21:30 CET (UTC+1) | Peña 29'; Gómez 65' (pen.); Foyth (yellow card) 80'; Alcácer (penalty missed) 90+2'; Coquelin (yellow card) 90+5' | Report | Milla (yellow card) 15'; Soldado 21'; Herrera (yellow card) 35'; Kenedy 75'; Machís (yellow card) 90'; Eteki (red card) 90+1'; Duarte (yellow card) 90+5' | Stadium: Estadio de la Cerámica; Attendance: 0 Referee: Valentín Pizarro Gómez |

| 24 January 2021 20 | Osasuna | 3–1 | Granada | Pamplona |
| 14:00 CET (UTC+1) | Budimir 27', 39'; Sánchez (yellow card) 37'; Roncaglia (yellow card) 63' (yellow-red card) 88'; Calleri (yellow card) 74'; Moncayola 86'; Torró (yellow card) 90+6' | Report | Vallejo (yellow card) 11'; Foulquier (yellow card) 38'; Suárez 50'; Duarte (yellow card) 77'; Germán (yellow card) 90+6' | Stadium: El Sadar; Attendance: 0 Referee: Xavier Estrada Fernández |

| 31 January 2021 21 | Granada | 0–0 | Celta Vigo | Granada |
| 18:30 CET (UTC+1) | Herrera (yellow card) 12'; Foulquier (yellow card) 44' | Report | Méndez (yellow card) 24'; Nolito (yellow card) 39'; Aspas (yellow card) 69'; Mina (yellow card) 90+2' | Stadium: Nuevo Los Cármenes; Attendance: 0 Referee: Carlos del Cerro Grande |

| 6 February 2021 22 | Levante | 2–2 | Granada | Valencia |
| 14:00 CET (UTC+1) | Morales 30', 67', (yellow card) 74' | Report | Kenedy 43'; Montoro (yellow card) 55'; Soldado (yellow card) 79', (goal) 90+2'; Suárez (yellow card) 90+4' | Stadium: Ciutat de València; Attendance: 0 Referee: Adrián Cordero Vega |

| 13 February 2021 23 | Granada | 1–2 | Atlético Madrid | Granada |
| 14:00 CET (UTC+1) | Herrera 66' | Report | Suárez (yellow card) 39'; Saúl (yellow card) 43'; Llorente 63'; Correa 74'; Savić (yellow card) 77'; Koke (yellow card) 89'; Carrasco (yellow card) 90+1' | Stadium: Nuevo Los Cármenes; Attendance: 0 Referee: Antonio Mateu Lahoz |

| 21 February 2021 24 | Huesca | 3–2 | Granada | Huesca |
| 18:30 CET (UTC+1) | Mir (penalty missed) 16'; Escriche 31'; Pulido 39'; Foulquier 44' (o.g.); Rico (yellow card) 51'; Insua (yellow card) 73'; Seoane (yellow card) 90+3' | Report | Quina 8'; Silva (yellow card) 15'; Soro 59'; Pérez (yellow card) 61'; Díaz (yellow card) 81'; Germán (red card) 90+1' | Stadium: El Alcoraz; Attendance: 0 Referee: César Soto Grado |

| 28 February 2021 25 | Granada | 2–1 | Elche | Granada |
| 18:30 CET (UTC+1) | Pérez (yellow card) 24'; Quina 31'; Molina (yellow card) 47'; Puertas 79'; Díaz (yellow card) 90+3' | Report | Mojica (yellow card) 34'; Boyé 40'; Josema (yellow card) 72' | Stadium: Nuevo Los Cármenes; Attendance: 0 Referee: Santiago Jaime Latre |

| 7 March 2021 26 | Athletic Bilbao | 2–1 | Granada | Bilbao |
| 21:00 CET (UTC+1) | Villalibre 3'; D. García (yellow card) 28'; Vencedor (yellow card) 68'; R. García (penalty missed) 71'; Berenguer 90+1' | Report | Herrera (yellow card) 59'; Molina 78'; Díaz (yellow card) 90+5' | Stadium: San Mamés; Attendance: 0 Referee: Juan Martínez Munuera |

| 14 March 2021 27 | Granada | 1–0 | Real Sociedad | Granada |
| 16:15 CET (UTC+1) | Germán 51', (yellow card) 85'; Kenedy (yellow card) 81' | Report | Portu (yellow card) 85'; Guevara (yellow card) 88'; Bautista (yellow card) 90+5' | Stadium: Nuevo Los Cármenes; Attendance: 0 Referee: Pablo González Fuertes |

| 21 March 2021 28 | Valencia | 2–1 | Granada | Valencia |
| 16:15 CET (UTC+1) | Wass 4'; Blanco 66' | Report | Germán (yellow card) 33'; Quini (yellow card) 67'; Soldado 90'; Montoro (yellow card) 90+5' | Stadium: Mestalla; Attendance: 0 Referee: Javier Alberola Rojas |

| 3 April 2021 29 | Granada | 0–3 | Villarreal | Granada |
| 14:00 CEST (UTC+2) | Soldado (yellow card) 36'; Quini (yellow card) 45+1'; Molina (penalty missed) 80' | Report | Gerard 9' (pen.), 18', 60' (pen.); Parejo (yellow card) 22'; Gaspar (yellow card) 43' | Stadium: Nuevo Los Cármenes; Attendance: 0 Referee: Guillermo Cuadra Fernández |

| 11 April 2021 30 | Valladolid | 1–2 | Granada | Valladolid |
| 18:30 CEST (UTC+2) | Orellana 41' (pen.); Alcaraz (yellow card) 62'; Janko (yellow card) 62'; Masip (yellow card) 64'; Bruno (yellow card) 69' | Report | Vallejo (yellow card) 34'; Suárez (yellow card) 67'; Molina 78'; Quini 86' | Stadium: José Zorrilla; Attendance: 0 Referee: Carlos del Cerro Grande |

| 22 April 2021 31 | Granada | 4–1 | Eibar | Granada |
| 21:00 CEST (UTC+2) | Soldado 21', 77'; Puertas 37'; Molina (yellow card) 41'; Kenedy 81' | Report | Recio (yellow card) 42'; Kike 64' | Stadium: Nuevo Los Cármenes; Attendance: 0 Referee: Santiago Jaime Latre |

| 25 April 2021 32 | Sevilla | 2–1 | Granada | Seville |
| 18:30 CEST (UTC+2) | Rakitić 16' (pen.); Ocampos 53'; Acuña (yellow card) 90'; Koundé (yellow card) 90+2' | Report | Kenedy (yellow card) 34'; Puertas (yellow card) 67'; Montoro (yellow card) 87'; Soldado 90' (pen.) | Stadium: Ramón Sánchez Pizjuán; Attendance: 0 Referee: Ricardo de Burgos Bengoetxea |

| 29 April 2021 33 | Barcelona | 1–2 | Granada | Barcelona |
| 19:00 CEST (UTC+2) | Messi 23' | Report | Soldado (yellow card) 20'; Pérez (yellow card) 43'; Machís 63'; Molina 79'; Germán (yellow card) 89'; Marín (yellow card) 90+4' | Stadium: Camp Nou; Attendance: 0 Referee: Pablo González Fuertes |

| 2 May 2021 34 | Granada | 0–1 | Cádiz | Granada |
| 18:30 CEST (UTC+2) | Suárez (yellow card) 66'; Gonalons (yellow card) 72'; Quini (yellow card) 77'; Soldado (yellow card) 87' (yellow-red card) 87'; Montoro (yellow card) 88'; Aarón (yellow card) 90+3' | Report | Sobrino 39', (yellow card) 75'; Negredo (yellow card) 74' | Stadium: Nuevo Los Cármenes; Attendance: 0 Referee: Isidro Díaz de Mera Escuderos |

| 10 May 2021 35 | Real Betis | 2–1 | Granada | Seville |
| 21:00 CEST (UTC+2) | Iglesias 39', 87'; Ruiz (yellow card) 55'; Joaquín (yellow card) 64' | Report | Montoro (yellow card) 12'; Puertas (yellow card) 57'; Machís 66'; Eteki (yellow card) 69'; Quini (yellow card) 90+1' | Stadium: Benito Villamarín; Attendance: 0 Referee: César Soto Grado |

| 13 May 2021 36 | Granada | 1–4 | Real Madrid | Granada |
| 22:00 CEST (UTC+2) | Molina (yellow card) 41', (goal) 71'; Eteki (yellow card) 53'; Quina (yellow card) 72' | Report | Modrić 17', (yellow card) 49'; Militão (yellow card) 38'; Rodrygo 45+1'; Nacho (yellow card) 63'; Odriozola 75'; Benzema 76' | Stadium: Nuevo Los Cármenes; Attendance: 0 Referee: Jesús Gil Manzano |

| 16 May 2021 37 | Alavés | 4–2 | Granada | Vitoria-Gasteiz |
| 18:30 CEST (UTC+2) | Pons 8'; R. Duarte 21'; Joselu 66'; Rioja 72'; Guidetti (yellow card) 90+3'; García (yellow card) 90+3' | Report | Pérez (yellow card) 20'; Eteki (yellow card) 30'; Molina 31'; D. Duarte (yellow card) 45'; Quini (yellow card) 47'; Puertas 63' | Stadium: Mendizorrotza; Attendance: 0 Referee: José María Sánchez Martínez |

| 23 May 2021 38 | Granada | 0–0 | Getafe | Granada |
| 18:30 CEST (UTC+2) | Germán (yellow card) 15'; Soro (yellow card) 22'; Díaz (yellow card) 56'; Eteki (yellow card) 63' | Report | Maksimović (yellow card) 35'; Abdulai (yellow card) 86' | Stadium: Nuevo Los Cármenes; Attendance: 0 Referee: David Medié Jiménez |

=== Copa del Rey ===
| 17 December 2020 First round | San Juan | 0–2 | Granada | Pamplona |
| 19:00 CET (UTC+1) | | Report | Kenedy 1'; Molina 26'; Pérez (yellow card) 45+1' | Stadium: Donibane; Referee: Alejandro Hernández Hernández |

| 6 January 2021 Second round | Cultural Leonesa | 1–2 (a.e.t.) | Granada | León |
| 17:00 CET (UTC+1) | Rovirola 3'; Suárez (yellow card) 10'; Samu (yellow card) 80'; Thérésin (yellow card) 110' | Report | Molina 19'; Machís 116' | Stadium: Reino de León; Referee: Xavier Estrada Fernández |

| 17 January 2021 Round of 32 | Málaga | 1–2 | Granada | Málaga |
| 12:00 CET (UTC+1) | Quintana 76'; Juande (yellow card) 78' | Report | Fede 16'; Molina 28' | Stadium: La Rosaleda; Referee: Carlos del Cerro Grande |

| 28 January 2021 Round of 16 | Navalcarnero | 0–6 | Granada | Navalcarnero |
| 19:00 CET (UTC+1) | | Report | Germán 9'; Soro 24'; Vico 32'; Soldado 34'; Pérez (yellow card) 37'; Foulquier 72'; Molina 78' | Stadium: Mariano González; Referee: Javier Alberola Rojas |

| 3 February 2021 Quarter-finals | Granada | 3–5 (a.e.t.) | Barcelona | Granada |
| 21:00 CET (UTC+1) | Eteki (yellow card) 29'; Kenedy 33'; Soldado 47'; Germán (yellow card) 77'; Montoro (yellow card) 90+3'; Vico 103' (pen.); Vallejo (yellow card) 119' | Report | Messi (yellow card) 25'; Griezmann 88', 100'; Alba 90+2', 113', (yellow card) 103'; De Jong 108' | Stadium: Nuevo Los Cármenes; Referee: José María Sánchez Martínez |

=== UEFA Europa League ===
==== Qualifying rounds and play-off round ====
| 17 September 2020 Second qualifying round | Teuta (Albania) | 0–4 | (Spain) Granada | Durrës, Albania |
| 16:00 CEST (UTC+2) | Daja (yellow card) 28'; Beqja (yellow card) 41' (yellow-red card) 80'; Krasniqi (yellow card) 65' | Report | Soldado 5'; Kenedy 10'; Herrera 31', 46' | Stadium: Niko Dovana Stadium; Attendance: 0 Referee: Willy Delajod (France) |

| 24 September 2020 Third qualifying round | Granada (Spain) | 2–0 | (Georgia (country)) Locomotive Tbilisi | Granada, Spain |
| 20:00 CEST (UTC+2) | Machís 48'; Soldado (yellow card) 56'; Molina 90+1' | Report | Dartsmelia (yellow card) 9'; Oulad Omar (yellow card) 22'; Gabadze (yellow card) 54' (yellow-red card) 59' | Stadium: Nuevo Los Cármenes; Attendance: 0 Referee: Serdar Gözübüyük (Netherlands) |

| 1 October 2020 Play-off round | Malmö FF (Sweden) | 1–3 | (Spain) Granada | Malmö, Sweden |
| 19:00 CEST (UTC+2) | Toivonen (yellow card) 41'; Berget 45'; Ahmedhodžić (yellow card) 61'; Larsson (yellow card) 79' | Report | Machís 30', (yellow card) 89'; Puertas 58'; Soldado (yellow card) 59'; Montoro (yellow card) 82'; Herrera 85', (yellow card) 86'; Germán (yellow card) 90+1' | Stadium: Eleda Stadion; Attendance: 0 Referee: István Kovács (Romania) |

==== Group stage ====
The group stage draw was held on 2 October 2020.

| Pos | Team | Pld | W | D | L | GF | GA | GD | Pts | Qualification | PSV | GRA | PAOK | OMO |
|---|---|---|---|---|---|---|---|---|---|---|---|---|---|---|
| 1 | (Netherlands) PSV Eindhoven | 6 | 4 | 0 | 2 | 12 | 9 | +3 | 12 | Advance to knockout phase | — | 1–2 | 3–2 | 4–0 |
| 2 | (Spain) Granada | 6 | 3 | 2 | 1 | 6 | 3 | +3 | 11 | Advance to knockout phase | 0–1 | — | 0–0 | 2–1 |
| 3 | (Greece) PAOK | 6 | 1 | 3 | 2 | 8 | 7 | +1 | 6 | | 4–1 | 0–0 | — | 1–1 |
| 4 | (Cyprus) Omonia | 6 | 1 | 1 | 4 | 5 | 12 | −7 | 4 | | 1–2 | 0–2 | 2–1 | — |

Source: UEFA
Rules for classification: Group stage tiebreakers

| 22 October 2020 1 | PSV Eindhoven (Netherlands) | 1–2 | (Spain) Granada | Eindhoven, Netherlands |
| 18:55 CEST (UTC+2) | Götze 45+1'; Mauro Júnior (yellow card) 45+3' | Report | Molina (yellow card) 45+1', (goal) 57'; Milla (yellow card) 45+2'; Montoro (yellow card) 49'; Machís 66'; Silva (yellow card) 90+2'; Suárez (yellow card) 90+5' | Stadium: Philips Stadion; Attendance: 0 (Note: Due to the COVID-19 pandemic in Europe, the match was played behind closed doors.); Referee: Felix Zwayer (Germany) |

| 29 October 2020 2 | Granada (Spain) | 0–0 | (Greece) PAOK | Granada, Spain |
| 21:00 CET (UTC+1) | Herrera (yellow card) 45'; Vallejo (yellow card) 68' | Report | Rodrigo (yellow card) 42'; Giannoulis (yellow card) 64'; Živković (yellow card) 74'; Douglas (yellow card) 90+2' | Stadium: Nuevo Los Cármenes; Attendance: 0 Referee: Tiago Martins (Portugal) |

| 5 November 2020 3 | Omonia (Cyprus) | 0–2 | (Spain) Granada | Strovolos, Cyprus |
| 18:55 CET (UTC+1) | Ďuriš (yellow card) 31' (yellow-red card) 41'; Lang (yellow card) 84' | Report | Herrera 4'; Neva (yellow card) 35'; Suárez 63' | Stadium: GSP Stadium; Attendance: 0 Referee: Ivan Bebek (Croatia) |

| 26 November 2020 4 | Granada (Spain) | 2–1 | (Cyprus) Omonia | Granada, Spain |
| 21:00 CET (UTC+1) | Suárez 8'; Pérez (yellow card) 15'; Gonalons (yellow card) 31'; Herrera (yellow card) 44'; Soro 73'; Machís (yellow card) 90+5' | Report | Kiko (yellow card) 55'; Asante 60'; Kousoulos (yellow card) 65'; Lecjaks (yellow card) 67'; Gómez (yellow card) 67'; Sene (yellow card) 90+5' | Stadium: Nuevo Los Cármenes; Attendance: 0 Referee: Stéphanie Frappart (France) |

| 3 December 2020 5 | Granada (Spain) | 0–1 | (Netherlands) PSV Eindhoven | Granada, Spain |
| 21:00 CET (UTC+1) | Duarte (yellow card) 18'; Germán (yellow card) 27'; Machís (yellow card) 77' | Report | Malen 38'; Sangaré (yellow card) 40'; Götze (yellow card) 61' | Stadium: Nuevo Los Cármenes; Attendance: 0 Referee: Roi Reinshreiber (Israel) |

| 10 December 2020 6 | PAOK (Greece) | 0–0 | (Spain) Granada | Thessaloniki, Greece |
| 18:55 CET (UTC+1) | Esiti (yellow card) 34'; Čolak (yellow card) 74'; Crespo (yellow card) 89'; Douglas (yellow card) 89' | Report | Pérez (yellow card) 86'; Germán (yellow card) 86'; Suárez (yellow card) 89' | Stadium: Toumba Stadium; Attendance: 0 Referee: John Beaton (Scotland) |

==== Knockout phase ====
===== Round of 32 =====
The draw for the round of 32 was held on 14 December 2020.

| 18 February 2021 First leg | Granada (Spain) | 2–0 | (Italy) Napoli | Granada, Spain |
| 21:00 CET (UTC+1) | Herrera 19'; Kenedy 21'; Foulquier (yellow card) 38'; Silva (yellow card) 77'; Díaz (yellow card) 86'; Eteki (yellow card) 90+2'; Montoro (yellow card) 90+2' | Report | Elmas (yellow card) 26'; Di Lorenzo (yellow card) 27'; Insigne (yellow card) 79'; Zieliński (yellow card) 83'; Mário Rui (yellow card) 90+1' | Stadium: Nuevo Los Cármenes; Attendance: 0 Referee: Sergei Karasev (Russia) |

| 25 February 2021 Second leg | Napoli (Italy) | 2–1 (2–3 agg.) | (Spain) Granada | Naples, Italy |
| 18:55 CET (UTC+1) | Zieliński 2'; Politano (yellow card) 37'; Maksimović (yellow card) 41'; Insigne (yellow card) 42'; Fabián 59'; Bakayoko (yellow card) 88'; Koulibaly (yellow card) 90' | Report | Montoro 25', (yellow card) 39'; Kenedy (yellow card) 37'; Duarte (yellow card) 40'; Germán (yellow card) 55'; Herrera (yellow card) 62'; Foulquier (yellow card) 90' | Stadium: Stadio San Paolo; Attendance: 0 Referee: Daniel Siebert (Germany) |

===== Round of 16 =====
The draw for the round of 16 was held on 26 February 2021.

| 11 March 2021 First leg | Granada (Spain) | 2–0 | (Norway) Molde | Granada, Spain |
| 21:00 CET (UTC+1) | Molina 26'; Eteki (yellow card) 33'; Soldado 75' | Report | Sigurðarson (yellow card) 48'; Hestad (yellow card) 57'; Ellingsen (yellow card) 68' (yellow-red card) 71'; Eikrem (yellow card) 90' | Stadium: Nuevo Los Cármenes; Attendance: 0 Referee: Paweł Raczkowski (Poland) |

| 18 March 2021 Second leg | Molde (Norway) | 2–1 (2–3 agg.) | (Spain) Granada | Budapest, Hungary |
| 18:55 CET (UTC+1) | Vallejo 29' (o.g.); Risa (yellow card) 62'; Hestad 90' (pen.) | Report | Díaz (yellow card) 7'; Soldado 72' | Stadium: Puskás Aréna; Attendance: 0 Referee: Srđan Jovanović (Serbia) |
Note: The match was played at Puskás Aréna, Budapest, due to the quarantine restrictions in response to the COVID-19 pandemic in Norway.

===== Quarter-finals =====
The draw for the quarter-finals was held on 19 March 2021.

| 8 April 2021 First leg | Granada (Spain) | 0–2 | (England) Manchester United | Granada, Spain |
| 21:00 CEST (UTC+2) | Duarte (yellow card) 51'; Eteki (yellow card) 89' | Report | Pogba (yellow card) 8'; Rashford 31'; McTominay (yellow card) 40'; Shaw (yellow card) 43'; Maguire (yellow card) 72'; Matić (yellow card) 84'; Fernandes 90' (pen.) | Stadium: Nuevo Los Cármenes; Attendance: 0 Referee: Artur Soares Dias (Portugal) |

| 15 April 2021 Second leg | Manchester United (England) | 2–0 (4–0 agg.) | (Spain) Granada | Manchester, England |
| 20:00 BST (UTC+1) | Cavani 6'; Pogba (yellow card) 17'; Vallejo 90' (o.g.) | Report | Soldado (yellow card) 20'; Germán (yellow card) 61'; Neva (yellow card) 74'; Montoro (yellow card) 74' | Stadium: Old Trafford; Attendance: 0 Referee: István Kovács (Romania) |

== Statistics ==
=== Squad statistics ===
Last updated 23 May 2021

| No. | Pos | Nat | Player | Total | | La Liga | | Copa del Rey | | Europa League | |
| No. | Pos | Nat | Player | Apps | Goals | Apps | Goals | Apps | Goals | Apps | Goals |
Goalkeepers
| 1 | GK | (Portugal) POR | Rui Silva | 46 | 0 | 32 | 0 | 0 | 0 | 14 | 0 |
| 13 | GK | (Spain) ESP | Aarón Escandell | 11 | 0 | 5 | 0 | 5 | 0 | 1 | 0 |
| 41 | GK | (Spain) ESP | Ángel Jiménez | 1 | 0 | 1 | 0 | 0 | 0 | 0 | 0 |
Defenders
| 2 | DF | (Guadeloupe) GLP | Dimitri Foulquier | 46 | 1 | 32 | 0 | 1+3 | 1 | 6+4 | 0 |
| 3 | DF | (Argentina) ARG | Nehuén Pérez | 26 | 0 | 9+5 | 0 | 4+1 | 0 | 3+4 | 0 |
| 6 | DF | (Spain) ESP | Germán | 50 | 4 | 29+5 | 3 | 3 | 1 | 11+2 | 0 |
| 15 | DF | (Spain) ESP | Carlos Neva | 37 | 0 | 21+1 | 0 | 2 | 0 | 12+1 | 0 |
| 16 | DF | (Spain) ESP | Víctor Díaz | 28 | 0 | 7+10 | 0 | 2 | 0 | 6+3 | 0 |
| 17 | DF | (Spain) ESP | Quini | 21 | 1 | 12+7 | 1 | 2 | 0 | 0 | 0 |
| 18 | DF | (Spain) ESP | Adrián Marín | 9 | 0 | 3+6 | 0 | 0 | 0 | 0 | 0 |
| 20 | DF | (Spain) ESP | Jesús Vallejo | 37 | 0 | 15+6 | 0 | 2+2 | 0 | 9+3 | 0 |
| 22 | DF | (Portugal) POR | Domingos Duarte | 42 | 1 | 27+2 | 1 | 1+1 | 0 | 10+1 | 0 |
| 28 | DF | (Spain) ESP | Pepe Sánchez | 9 | 0 | 3 | 0 | 3+1 | 0 | 2 | 0 |
| 42 | DF | (Spain) ESP | Sergio Barcia | 2 | 0 | 1 | 0 | 0+1 | 0 | 0 | 0 |
| 44 | DF | (Ghana) GHA | Kingsley Fobi | 1 | 0 | 0+1 | 0 | 0 | 0 | 0 | 0 |
| | DF | (Colombia) COL | Neyder Lozano | 0 | 0 | 0 | 0 | 0 | 0 | 0 | 0 |
Midfielders
| 4 | MF | (France) FRA | Maxime Gonalons | 40 | 0 | 18+7 | 0 | 0 | 0 | 14+1 | 0 |
| 5 | MF | (Spain) ESP | Luis Milla | 24 | 1 | 14+2 | 1 | 1 | 0 | 6+1 | 0 |
| 8 | MF | (Cameroon) CMR | Yan Eteki | 40 | 0 | 16+9 | 0 | 5 | 0 | 3+7 | 0 |
| 12 | MF | (Portugal) POR | Domingos Quina | 8 | 2 | 5+3 | 2 | 0 | 0 | 0 | 0 |
| 14 | MF | (Spain) ESP | Fede Vico | 25 | 3 | 9+11 | 0 | 3+1 | 3 | 0+1 | 0 |
| 19 | MF | (Spain) ESP | Ángel Montoro | 36 | 2 | 17+5 | 1 | 1+2 | 0 | 9+2 | 1 |
| 21 | MF | (Venezuela) VEN | Yangel Herrera | 46 | 8 | 25+7 | 3 | 0+2 | 0 | 11+1 | 5 |
| 24 | MF | (Brazil) BRA | Kenedy | 44 | 8 | 18+10 | 4 | 3+1 | 2 | 11+1 | 2 |
| 26 | MF | (Spain) ESP | Alberto Soro | 28 | 3 | 3+12 | 1 | 5 | 1 | 3+5 | 1 |
| 27 | MF | (Spain) ESP | Antonio Aranda | 1 | 0 | 0 | 0 | 1 | 0 | 0 | 0 |
| 29 | MF | (Spain) ESP | Isma Ruiz | 4 | 0 | 1 | 0 | 0+2 | 0 | 0+1 | 0 |
| 36 | MF | (Argentina) ARG | Juan Ignacio Brunet | 2 | 0 | 0+2 | 0 | 0 | 0 | 0 | 0 |
| 37 | MF | (Spain) ESP | Álvaro Bravo | 1 | 0 | 0+1 | 0 | 0 | 0 | 0 | 0 |
Forwards
| 7 | FW | (Colombia) COL | Luis Suárez | 37 | 7 | 18+9 | 5 | 0+2 | 0 | 3+5 | 2 |
| 9 | FW | (Spain) ESP | Roberto Soldado | 43 | 14 | 16+13 | 9 | 2+1 | 2 | 8+3 | 3 |
| 10 | FW | (Spain) ESP | Antonio Puertas | 53 | 4 | 22+13 | 3 | 3+1 | 0 | 9+5 | 1 |
| 11 | FW | (Venezuela) VEN | Darwin Machís | 46 | 9 | 21+11 | 5 | 0+2 | 1 | 8+4 | 3 |
| 23 | FW | (Spain) ESP | Jorge Molina | 51 | 15 | 17+16 | 8 | 4 | 4 | 6+8 | 3 |
| 38 | FW | (Spain) ESP | Dani Plomer | 1 | 0 | 0+1 | 0 | 0 | 0 | 0 | 0 |
Players who have made an appearance this season but have left the club
| 12 | MF | (Nigeria) NGR | Ramon Azeez | 4 | 0 | 1+1 | 0 | 2 | 0 | 0 | 0 |

=== Goalscorers ===
As of 30 December 2020

| Rank | No. | Pos | Nat | Name | La Liga | Copa del Rey | Europa League | Total |
|---|---|---|---|---|---|---|---|---|
| 1 | 21 | MF | (Venezuela) | Yangel Herrera | 2 | 0 | 4 | 6 |
| 1 | 23 | FW | (Spain) | Jorge Molina | 3 | 1 | 2 | 6 |
| 3 | 7 | FW | (Colombia) | Luis Suárez | 3 | 0 | 2 | 5 |
| 3 | 11 | FW | (Venezuela) | Darwin Machís | 2 | 0 | 3 | 5 |
| 5 | 9 | FW | (Spain) | Roberto Soldado | 3 | 0 | 1 | 4 |
| 6 | 24 | MF | (Brazil) | Kenedy | 1 | 1 | 1 | 3 |
| 7 | 6 | DF | (Spain) | Germán | 2 | 0 | 0 | 2 |
| 8 | 22 | DF | (Portugal) | Domingos Duarte | 1 | 0 | 0 | 1 |
| 8 | 5 | MF | (Spain) | Luis Milla | 1 | 0 | 0 | 1 |
| 8 | 19 | MF | (Spain) | Ángel Montoro | 1 | 0 | 0 | 1 |
| 8 | 10 | FW | (Spain) | Antonio Puertas | 0 | 0 | 1 | 1 |
| 8 | 26 | MF | (Spain) | Alberto Soro | 0 | 0 | 1 | 1 |
| Totals | | | | | 19 | 2 | 15 | 36 |
