= Víctor Díaz (footballer, born 1988) =

Spanish footballer

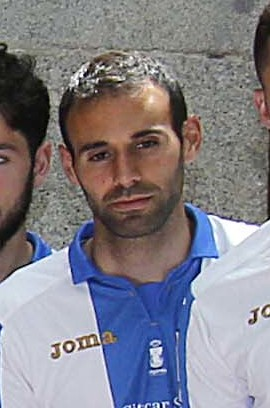
- Díaz with Leganés in 2016

Personal information
- Full name: Víctor David Díaz Miguel
- Date of birth: 12 June 1988 (age 38)
- Place of birth: Seville, Spain
- Height: 1.84 m (6 ft 0 in)
- Position: Right-back

Youth career
- 1999–2007: Sevilla

Senior career*
Years	Team	Apps	(Gls)
2006–2010	Sevilla B	70	(1)
2010–2011	Oviedo	34	(2)
2011–2012	Celta B	33	(1)
2012–2014	Lugo	52	(5)
2014–2015	Recreativo	37	(1)
2015–2017	Leganés	62	(2)
2017–2024	Granada	184	(6)
Total		472	(18)

International career
2007	Spain U19	7	(0)
- * Club domestic league appearances and goals

Víctor David Díaz Miguel (born 12 June 1988) is a Spanish former professional footballer who played as a right-back.

== Club career ==
Díaz was born in Seville, Andalusia. A Sevilla FC youth graduate, he made his senior debut with the reserves in the 2006–07 season, achieving promotion from the Segunda División B.

Díaz played his first professional match on 25 November 2007, starting in a 1–1 away draw against Racing de Ferrol in the Segunda División. He was regularly used until the end of his spell, suffering relegation in 2009.

Díaz moved to third-tier club Real Oviedo on 29 June 2010. On 1 September of the following year, after a failed trial at Charlton Athletic, he joined Celta de Vigo B in the same league.

On 14 July 2012, Díaz signed a two-year deal with CD Lugo in division two. He scored his first professional goal on 14 December, the first in a 3–2 home win over Real Madrid Castilla.

On 16 July 2014, Díaz moved to Recreativo de Huelva in the same tier. On 17 August 2015, having been relegated, he agreed to a two-year contract at CD Leganés. He achieved promotion to La Liga at the end of the campaign, contributing 39 appearances and one goal.

Díaz made his debut in the Spanish top flight on 22 August 2016, starting and scoring the game's only goal in a win at RC Celta de Vigo – it was also the first ever goal for the Madrid side in the competition. In July 2017, he joined Granada CF on a two-year deal.

In June 2019, after promoting to the top division, Díaz signed a new three-year contract. On 16 July of the following year, he scored a late winner at RCD Mallorca in the penultimate game of the season, relegating the hosts and putting his side in line for a UEFA Europa League place.

After an arthroscopy on his knee in October 2020, club captain Díaz was out of action; on his return to training in December, a muscular injury ruled him out for longer.

== Career statistics ==
As of match played 22 May 2022

Appearances and goals by club, season and competition
Club	Season	League			National Cup		Continental		Total	
Club	Season	Division	Apps	Goals	Apps	Goals	Apps	Goals	Apps	Goals
Sevilla B	2006–07	Segunda División B	6	0	—		—		6	0
Sevilla B	2007–08	Segunda División	17	0	—		—		17	0
Sevilla B	2008–09	Segunda División	19	0	—		—		19	0
Sevilla B	2009–10	Segunda División B	28	1	—		—		28	1
Sevilla B	Total		70	1	0	0	0	0	70	1
Oviedo	2010–11	Segunda División B	34	2	2	0	—		36	2
Celta B	2011–12	Segunda División B	33	1	—		—		33	1
Lugo	2012–13	Segunda División	31	3	1	0	—		32	3
Lugo	2013–14	Segunda División	21	2	2	0	—		23	2
Lugo	Total		52	5	3	0	0	0	55	5
Recreativo	2014–15	Segunda División	37	1	2	0	—		39	1
Leganés	2015–16	Segunda División	39	1	1	0	—		40	1
Leganés	2016–17	La Liga	23	1	2	0	—		25	1
Leganés	Total		62	2	3	0	0	0	65	3
Granada	2017–18	Segunda División	38	1	0	0	—		38	1
Granada	2018–19	Segunda División	38	2	1	0	—		39	2
Granada	2019–20	La Liga	36	1	4	0	—		40	1
Granada	2020–21	La Liga	17	0	2	0	9 (Note: Appearances in UEFA Europa League)	0	28	0
Granada	2021–22	La Liga	22	1	0	0	—		22	1
Granada	Total		151	5	7	0	9	0	167	5
Career total			439	17	17	0	9	0	465	17

== Honours ==
Granada

- Segunda División: 2022–23

Spain U19

- UEFA European Under-19 Championship: 2007
