= Juan Ignacio Brunet =

Argentine footballer

Juan Brunet
Personal information
- Full name: Juan Ignacio Brunet Bordin
- Date of birth: 24 January 1998 (age 28)
- Place of birth: Maipú, Argentina
- Height: 1.90 m (6 ft 3 in)
- Position: Midfielder

Team information
- Current team: Scafatese
- Number: 23

Youth career
- Godoy Cruz
- 2016–2018: Atlético Paranaense

Senior career*
Years	Team	Apps	(Gls)
2018–2020	Polvorín	51	(5)
2020–2021	Granada B	14	(0)
2020–2021	Granada	2	(0)
2021–2023	Bergantiños	54	(3)
2023–2024	Rotonda	27	(1)
2024–2025	Sestri Levante	22	(3)
2025–2026	Campobasso	29	(2)
2026–	Scafatese	2	(0)

International career
2017	Argentina U17		
- * Club domestic league appearances and goals as of 28 August 2026

Juan Ignacio Brunet Bordin (born 24 January 1998) is an Argentine professional footballer who plays as a midfielder for Serie C Group C club Scafatese.

== Club career ==
Brunet was born in Maipú, Mendoza, and joined Atlético Paranaense's youth setup in 2016, from Godoy Cruz. In July 2018, he moved to Spain with CD Lugo and was initially assigned to the farm team in Tercera División.

Brunet made his senior debut on 9 September 2018, playing 35 minutes in a 0–4 away loss against Racing de Ferrol. He scored his first goal on 11 November, netting his team's fifth in a 5–2 away routing of Ribadumia CF.

On 31 July 2020, Brunet signed a one-year deal with Granada CF, being initially assigned to the reserves in Segunda División B. He made his first team – and La Liga – debut on 8 November, coming on as a second-half substitute for fellow debutant Isma Ruiz in a 0–2 away loss against Real Sociedad, as his side was heavily impacted by the COVID-19 pandemic.

On 12 June 2024, Brunet signed a one-season contract with Sestri Levante, with an option for a second year.
