= Álvaro Bravo =

Spanish footballer (born 1998)

Personal information
- Full name: Álvaro Bravo Jiménez
- Date of birth: 4 February 1998 (age 28)
- Place of birth: Pinto, Spain
- Height: 1.83 m (6 ft 0 in)
- Position: Midfielder

Team information
- Current team: Palm City
- Number: 8

Youth career
- 2005–2006: Atlético Pinto
- 2006–2017: Real Madrid

Senior career*
Years	Team	Apps	(Gls)
2017–2020	Real Madrid B	12	(0)
2017–2018	→ Fuenlabrada (loan)	21	(0)
2018–2019	→ Mirandés (loan)	22	(1)
2020–2021	Granada B	23	(3)
2020	Granada	1	(0)
2021–2024	Fuenlabrada	52	(0)
2025	Rayo Majadahonda	1	(0)
2025–	Palm City	0	(0)

International career
2013	Spain U16	1	(0)
- * Club domestic league appearances and goals as of 4 May 2025

Álvaro Bravo Jiménez (born 4 February 1998) is a Spanish professional footballer who plays as a midfielder for Emirati club Palm City.

== Club career ==
Born in Pinto, Community of Madrid, Bravo joined Real Madrid's La Fábrica in 2006, from hometown side CA Pinto. On 14 July 2017, after finishing his formation, he was loaned to neighbouring CF Fuenlabrada in Segunda División B, for one year.

Bravo made his senior debut on 20 August 2017, coming on as a late substitute for Hugo Fraile in a 1–2 home loss against Deportivo Fabril. He contributed with 22 appearances during the campaign, as his side missed out promotion in the play-offs.

On 23 August 2018, Bravo joined fellow third division side CD Mirandés on loan for one year. He helped the side to achieve promotion to Segunda División, and subsequently returned to Los Blancos in July 2019, being assigned to the B-team in the third tier.

On 17 July 2020, Bravo agreed to a three-year contract with Granada CF, being initially assigned to the reserves still in division three. He made his first team – and La Liga – debut on 8 November, replacing Jorge Molina in a 0–2 away loss against Real Sociedad, as his side was heavily impacted by the COVID-19 pandemic.

On 26 November 2021, free agent Bravo returned to Fuenla, signing a two-year contract with the club now in Segunda División.

On 27 February 2025, Bravo signed with Rayo Majadahonda in Segunda Federación.

== International career ==
Bravo represented Spain at under-16 level in 2013, playing one match for the side.
