= Kingsley Fobi =

Ghanaian footballer (born 1998)

Personal information
- Date of birth: 20 September 1998 (age 28)
- Place of birth: Cape Coast, Ghana
- Height: 1.80 m (5 ft 11 in)
- Position: Right-back

Team information
- Current team: St Joseph's
- Number: 2

Youth career
- Right to Dream Academy

Senior career*
Years	Team	Apps	(Gls)
2016–2017	Granada B	6	(0)
2017–2020	Watford	0	(0)
2017–2018	→ Formentera (loan)	20	(0)
2018–2019	→ Ibiza (loan)	18	(0)
2019–2020	→ Badajoz (loan)	5	(0)
2020–2021	Granada B	13	(0)
2020–2021	Granada	1	(0)
2022	Chania	17	(1)
2022–2024	Estepona	52	(1)
2024–2026	Montijo	53	(1)
2026–	St Joseph's	8	(0)

International career
2015	Ghana U20	3	(0)
2019	Ghana U23	5	(0)
- * Club domestic league appearances and goals as of 21 November 2026

Kingsley Fobi (born 20 September 1998) is a Ghanaian professional footballer who plays as a right-back for Gibraltar Football League club St Joseph's.

== Club career ==
=== Early career ===
Fobi was born in Cape Coast and started his career in the Right to Dream Academy, before agreeing to a deal Udinese in January 2016; he was subsequently assigned to Granada CF. He made his senior debut with Granada's B-team on 28 January 2017, coming on as a late substitute for Sergio Peña in a 3–0 Segunda División B home win against Mérida AD.

=== Watford ===
Fobi had his federative rights assigned to Watford in 2017, being subsequently loaned to SD Formentera in the third division on 26 July of that year. Loans to UD Ibiza and CD Badajoz followed, but he featured sparingly for both sides before leaving Watford in 2020 without making a competitive appearance for the club.

=== Granada return ===
On 19 August 2020, Fobi returned to Granada and their B-side, after agreeing to a two-year contract. He made his first team – and La Liga – debut on 8 November, replacing Kenedy at half-time in a 2–0 away loss against Real Sociedad, as his side was heavily impacted by the COVID-19 pandemic.

=== St Joseph's ===
After a few seasons as a journeyman in the Spanish lower leagues, Fobi joined St Joseph's on 23 June 2026.

== International career ==
Fobi represented Ghana at under-20 and under-23 levels, playing for the former in the 2015 FIFA U-20 World Cup.
