= Carlos Neva =

Spanish footballer

Personal information
- Full name: Carlos Neva Tey
- Date of birth: 12 June 1996 (age 30)
- Place of birth: El Puerto de Santa María, Spain
- Height: 1.74 m (5 ft 9 in)
- Position: Left-back

Team information
- Current team: Albacete
- Number: 21

Youth career
- 2008–2011: SAFA San Luis
- 2011–2013: Portuense
- 2013–2014: Recreativo Portuense
- 2014: Real Madrid
- 2014–2015: Sevilla

Senior career*
Years	Team	Apps	(Gls)
2013	Portuense	5	(1)
2015–2016	Sevilla C	33	(0)
2016–2017	Marbella	15	(0)
2017–2019	Granada B	55	(1)
2019–2025	Granada	157	(3)
2025–	Albacete	32	(0)
- * Club domestic league appearances and goals as of 9 June 2026

Carlos Neva Tey (born 12 June 1996) is a Spanish professional footballer who plays as a left-back for Albacete Balompié.

== Club career ==
Neva was born in El Puerto de Santa María, Cádiz, Andalusia, and made his senior debut for Racing Club Portuense on 21 April 2013, in a 0–1 Tercera División away loss against Ayamonte CF. On 12 May he scored his first senior goal, in a 2–1 home defeat of CA Ceuta.

In July 2014, Neva joined Real Madrid's youth setup, but was deemed surplus to requirements and moved to Sevilla FC in September. He renewed his contract with the latter side the following 8 July, being promoted to the C-team.

On 26 July 2016, Neva signed for Marbella FC in Segunda División B. Roughly one year later, he agreed to a deal with Granada CF and was assigned to the reserves also in the third division.

Neva made his professional debut on 8 June 2019, coming on as a second-half substitute for Fran Rico in a 2–1 home win against AD Alcorcón in the Segunda División championship. On 15 August, he renewed his contract until 2021 and was definitely promoted to the main squad, now in La Liga.

Neva made his debut in the top tier on 21 September 2019, starting in a 2–0 home win against FC Barcelona, and subsequently profitted from injuries of starter Álex Martínez to establish himself as a first-choice during the campaign. On 23 July 2020, he further extended his contract until 2022.

On 8 February 2021, Neva renewed his link with the Nazaríes until 2025. He remained a starter for the side during the following years, suffering relegation in 2021–22 but immediately returning in 2022–23; during the latter season, he scored his first professional goal, netting his team's only in a 3–1 away loss against Levante UD on 14 January 2023.

Neva left Granada on 6 June 2025, as his contract was due to expire; he departed the club after eight seasons, two of them spent with the reserves, and ended his spell with 177 official matches for the main squad, becoming the player with the most appearances for the side in the 21st century. On 1 September, he signed a one-year deal with Albacete Balompié also in the second division.

== Career statistics ==
=== Club ===
As of match played 25 April 2021

Appearances and goals by club, season and competition
Club	Season	League			National Cup		Continental		Total	
Club	Season	Division	Apps	Goals	Apps	Goals	Apps	Goals	Apps	Goals
Portuense	2012–13	Tercera División	5	1	—		—		5	1
Sevilla C	2015–16	Tercera División	33	0	—		—		33	0
Marbella	2016–17	Segunda División B	15	0	—		—		15	0
Granada B	2017–18	Segunda División B	24	0	—		—		24	0
Granada B	2018–19	Segunda División B	31	1	—		—		31	1
Granada B	Total		55	1	0	0	0	0	55	1
Granada	2018–19	Segunda División	1	0	3	0	—		4	0
Granada	2019–20	La Liga	26	0	2	0	—		28	0
Granada	2020–21	La Liga	22	0	0	0	13 (Note: Appearance(s) in UEFA Europa League)	0	35	0
Granada	2021–22	La Liga	0	0	0	0	—		0	0
Granada	Total		49	0	5	0	13	0	67	0
Career total			157	2	5	0	13	0	175	2

== Honours ==
Granada

- Segunda División: 2022–23
