= Rodri (footballer, born 2002) =

Spanish footballer

Personal information
- Full name: Rodrigo Suárez Marcos
- Date of birth: 14 November 2002 (age 23)
- Place of birth: León, Spain
- Height: 1.86 m (6 ft 1 in)
- Position: Centre-back

Team information
- Current team: Cultural Leonesa
- Number: 4

Youth career
- 2016–2021: Cultural Leonesa

Senior career*
Years	Team	Apps	(Gls)
2019–2022	Júpiter Leonés	23	(0)
2021–	Cultural Leonesa	95	(3)
2023	→ Avilés (loan)	7	(0)
- * Club domestic league appearances and goals as of 9 June 2026

Rodrigo Suárez Marcos (born 14 November 2002), sometimes known as just Rodri, is a Spanish professional footballer who plays as a centre-back for Cultural y Deportiva Leonesa.

== Career ==
Born in León, Rodri joined Cultural y Deportiva Leonesa's youth sides in 2016. He made his senior debut with the reserves on 1 December 2019, coming on as a second-half substitute in a 6–0 Tercera División away loss to Gimnástica Segoviana CF.

On 16 December 2020, Rodri renewed his contract with the club until 2024. He made his first team debut at the age of 18 the following 6 January, starting in a 2–1 home loss to Granada CF, for the season's Copa del Rey.

On 19 August 2022, after being regularly used in the first team the previous season, Rodri was definitely promoted to Cultu's main squad in Primera Federación. On 16 January of the following year, after making no appearances during the campaign, he was loaned to Segunda Federación side Real Avilés CF, until June.

Upon returning, Rodri extended his link with Cultural until 2026 on 9 August 2023. On 9 July of the following year, after establishing himself as a starter, he renewed his contract until 2027.

Rodri lost his starting spot to new signing Eneko Satrústegui in the 2024–25 season, but still featured in 21 matches overall as the club achieved promotion to Segunda División. He made his professional debut on 15 August 2025, coming on as a late substitute for Satrústegui in a 5–1 away loss to Burgos CF.
