= Germán Sánchez (footballer) =

Spanish footballer

Germán
Personal information
- Full name: Germán Sánchez Barahona
- Date of birth: 12 December 1986 (age 39)
- Place of birth: San Fernando, Spain
- Height: 1.87 m (6 ft 1 1/2 in)
- Position: Centre-back

Youth career
- 2004–2005: UD San Fernando

Senior career*
Years	Team	Apps	(Gls)
2005–2007	Bazán		
2007	CD San Fernando	3	(0)
2007–2010	Cádiz B	65	(12)
2008–2009	→ CD San Fernando (loan)	25	(0)
2010–2011	Cádiz	0	(0)
2011–2014	San Fernando CD	113	(12)
2014–2015	Olot	36	(4)
2015–2017	Tenerife	55	(2)
2017–2022	Granada	146	(9)
2022–2024	Racing Santander	54	(2)
2024–2025	San Fernando	30	(0)
Total		527	(41)
- * Club domestic league appearances and goals

Germán Sánchez Barahona (born 12 December 1986), known simply as Germán, is a Spanish former professional footballer who played as a central defender.

== Club career ==
=== Early years ===
Born in San Fernando, Province of Cádiz, Germán started playing with UD San Fernando as a central midfielder, and made his senior debut with fellow Andalusians GE Bazán CF the following season. He first arrived in the Segunda División B in 2008 with CD San Fernando, on loan from Cádiz CF.

Germán returned to the Estadio Ramón de Carranza in summer 2007, initially being assigned to the reserves in the Tercera División but moving to the first team in June 2010. After making no league appearances during the first half of the 2010–11 campaign, he moved to San Fernando CD on 31 January 2011. Always a starter, he helped the latter club win promotion to the third level in 2012, being converted to a central defender in the process.

On 19 June 2014, after suffering relegation, Germán signed a one-year deal with UE Olot. On 27 May 2015, he opted to not renew his contract at the division three side.

=== Tenerife ===
Germán joined CD Tenerife on 10 July 2015, after agreeing to a one-year contract. He made his Segunda División debut on 23 August at the age of 28, starting in a 6–3 away loss against CD Numancia.

Germán scored his first professional goal on 25 October 2015, a last-minute equaliser in a 2–2 home draw with CA Osasuna.

=== Granada ===
On 3 July 2017, Germán signed a two-year deal with Granada CF also of the second tier. In 2018–19, he contributed 38 matches and one goal as they returned to La Liga after a two-year absence, and subsequently agreed to an extension until 30 June 2021.

Germán's maiden appearance in the competition took place on 17 August 2019, when he played the entire 4–4 draw at Villarreal CF. He scored his first goal on 15 September, opening a 2–0 away win over RC Celta de Vigo seconds before half-time.

Germán played 13 games in the 2020–21 edition of the UEFA Europa League, and his side reached the quarter-finals in their first-ever participation in Europe.

=== Racing Santander ===
On 4 August 2022, free agent Germán joined second-tier Racing de Santander on a two-year contract. He scored his first goal the following 19 March, a 98th-minute header in a 1–1 away draw against CD Lugo.

=== Later career ===
In August 2024, aged 37, Germán returned to San Fernando CD, with the club now in the Segunda Federación.

== Personal life ==
Sánchez's brother, Servando, was also a footballer and a defender.

== Career statistics ==
As of match played 23 May 2021

Appearances and goals by club, season and competition
Club	Season	League			National Cup		Continental		Other		Total	
Club	Season	Division	Apps	Goals	Apps	Goals	Apps	Goals	Apps	Goals	Apps	Goals
CD San Fernando	2006–07	Tercera División	3	0	0	0	—		—		3	0
Cádiz B	2007–08	Tercera División	31	6	—		—		—		31	6
Cádiz B	2009–10	Tercera División	34	6	—		—		—		34	6
Cádiz B	Total		65	12	0	0	0	0	0	0	65	12
CD San Fernando (loan)	2008–09	Segunda División B	25	0	0	0	—		—		25	0
Cádiz	2010–11	Segunda División B	0	0	2	0	—		—		2	0
San Fernando CD	2010–11	Tercera División	13	1	0	0	—		5 (Note: Appearances in promotion playoffs)	0	18	1
San Fernando CD	2011–12	Tercera División	36	4	0	0	—		6	1	42	5
San Fernando CD	2012–13	Segunda División B	32	4	0	0	—		—		32	4
San Fernando CD	2013–14	Segunda División B	32	3	2	0	—		—		34	3
San Fernando CD	Total		113	12	2	0	0	0	11	1	126	13
Olot	2014–15	Segunda División B	36	4	0	0	—		—		36	4
Tenerife	2015–16	Segunda División	27	1	0	0	—		—		27	1
Tenerife	2016–17	Segunda División	28	1	2	1	—		4	0	34	2
Tenerife	Total		55	2	2	1	0	0	4	0	61	3
Granada	2017–18	Segunda División	14	1	0	0	—		—		14	1
Granada	2018–19	Segunda División	38	1	0	0	—		—		38	1
Granada	2019–20	La Liga	28	2	5	1	—		—		33	3
Granada	2020–21	La Liga	34	3	3	1	13 (Note: Appearances in UEFA Europa League)	0	—		50	4
Granada	Total		114	7	8	2	13	0	0	0	135	9
Career total			411	37	14	3	13	0	15	1	453	41
