= Jorge Molina (footballer, born 1982) =

Spanish footballer

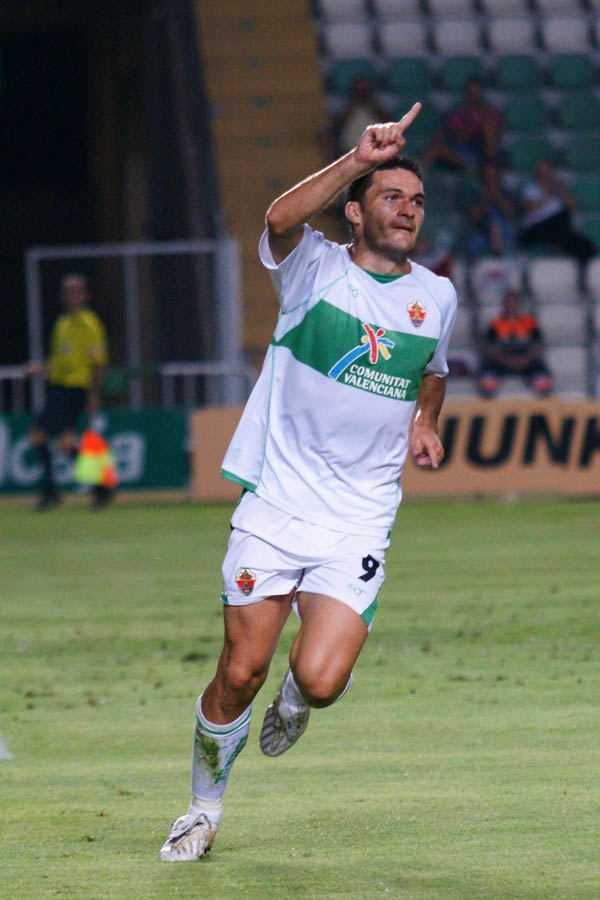
- Molina with Elche in 2010

Personal information
- Full name: Jorge Molina Vidal
- Date of birth: 22 April 1982 (age 44)
- Place of birth: Alcoy, Spain
- Height: 1.88 m (6 ft 2 in)
- Position: Centre-forward

Youth career
- Alcoyano

Senior career*
Years	Team	Apps	(Gls)
2001–2002	Alcoyano	28	(12)
2002–2004	Benidorm	67	(12)
2004–2005	Gandía	22	(5)
2005–2007	Benidorm	72	(34)
2007–2009	Poli Ejido	66	(24)
2009–2010	Elche	38	(26)
2010–2016	Betis	180	(66)
2016–2020	Getafe	147	(46)
2020–2023	Granada	93	(21)
Total		713	(246)
- * Club domestic league appearances and goals

Jorge Molina Vidal (born 22 April 1982) is a Spanish former professional footballer who played as a centre-forward.

A late bloomer, he began to play organised football at 25 with Poli Ejido. He represented mainly Betis during his career, achieving two promotions to La Liga and scoring 77 goals in 213 matches in all competitions in the process. In the Spanish top division, he also represented Getafe and Granada, totalling 289 games and 73 goals over nine seasons.

== Career ==
=== Early years ===
Molina was born in Alcoy, Province of Alicante. Until the age of 23, he only played in the Tercera División, representing CD Alcoyano, Benidorm CF and CF Gandía. In 2005 he re-joined Benidorm, now in the Segunda División B.

Molina made his professional debut in 2007–08, playing in the Segunda División with Polideportivo Ejido. It would be a short-lived experience, as his five goals – squad-best, tied with three other players – in 30 matches, were not enough to prevent relegation. On 29 October 2008, he scored a hat-trick in a 5–0 home win against Villarreal CF in the round of 32 of the Copa del Rey (6–1 on aggregate).

In the summer of 2009, both Molina and teammate Juli signed with another side in the second division, Elche CF. His debut season was nothing short of spectacular, as he led the scoring charts with 26; on 19 June 2010, even though none of the teams left had anything to play for, he scored four times in the 4–1 home victory over champions Real Sociedad.

=== Betis ===
On 29 June 2010, Molina moved to Andalusia's Real Betis (also in the second tier) for €1.6 million, with the player signing a four-year contract; if his new club managed to promote at the end of the season, Elche were entitled to a €500,000 bonus. He scored 18 league goals in his first year (22 in all competitions), in spite of being sidelined for nearly three months with a knee injury. On 19 January 2011, in the domestic cup, he scored twice against FC Barcelona in a 3–1 home win (6–3 aggregate loss in the quarter-finals), thus ending the Catalans' unbeaten run of 28 games.

The attacking trio of Molina, Rubén Castro and midfielder Achille Emaná totalled more than 50 league goals in 2010–11, as Betis returned to La Liga after two years of absence. He made his debut in the competition at the age of 29, playing 30 minutes in a 1–0 away defeat of Granada CF. He scored his first goal on 15 October 2011, in a 4–1 loss to Real Madrid.

Molina and his team achieved another promotion at the end of the 2014–15 campaign, with him contributing 19 goals.

=== Getafe ===
On 24 June 2016, the 34-year-old Molina signed a two-year contract with Getafe CF on a free transfer. He scored 20 goals in his first year, ranking fourth in the individual charts to help his team return to the top flight.

On 31 August 2019, Molina scored in a 1–1 draw against Deportivo Alavés at the age of 37 years and 131 days, becoming the club's oldest player to achieve the feat in the Spanish top tier.

=== Granada ===
Molina agreed to a two-year deal with Granada on 25 August 2020. The following 29 April, he scored a header after coming on as a substitute against Barcelona, putting his team 2–1 ahead for their first ever win at the Camp Nou.

On 28 October 2021, Molina scored a last-minute equaliser to salvage a 1–1 draw against Getafe. On 13 December, he scored in the same fashion for the same result, this time against Cádiz CF. In the next match, he scored his first hat-trick in La Liga to help to a 4–1 victory over RCD Mallorca and, in doing so at the age of 39 years and 241 days, he not only became the oldest player to do so, breaking the previous record held by Joaquín (38 years and 140 days), but also became the oldest to net three times in Europe's top five leagues, surpassing the previous mark by Rodrigo Palacio in Serie A (39 years and 86 days). Three days later, Molina scored in his third game in a row, thus becoming the oldest to do so in the main five leagues in the continent, completing the 2–1 comeback defeat of Atlético Madrid; this was also his eighth goal contribution in the last five fixtures, with only Bayer 04 Leverkusen's Patrik Schick having more in the same timeframe.

On 7 May 2022, Molina scored twice against relegation rivals Mallorca in a 6–2 away win, becoming at 40 years and 15 days the oldest player to score a brace in the main division as well as only the second to achieve this after his 40th birthday after Donato. Granada entered the last matchday needing only a win to secure survival amidst a three-way battle with that opposition and Cádiz, but he missed a 72nd-minute penalty in an eventual 0–0 draw at home with RCD Espanyol, allowing Cádiz to stay up while his team was relegated.

On 13 November 2022, Molina closed a 3–2 win over Yeclano Deportivo in the first round of the domestic cup and, at the age of 40 years and 205 days, became the oldest scorer in the history of the tournament, breaking the previous record held by Elche's Nino in 2021 (40 years and 189 days). After never suffering a muscle injury in his two-decade career, he was four games away from renewing when he ruptured his cruciate ligament on 12 March against SD Ponferradina; he still helped his side to achieve promotion in July, and announced his retirement shortly after.

Molina retired with nearly 800 appearances and more than 300 goals to his credit.

== Career statistics ==
Appearances and goals by club, season and competition
Club	Season	League			National cup		Continental		Other		Total	
Club	Season	Division	Apps	Goals	Apps	Goals	Apps	Goals	Apps	Goals	Apps	Goals
Alcoyano	2001–02	Tercera División	28	12	—		—		—		28	12
Benidorm	2002–03	Tercera División	30	4	—		—		—		30	4
Benidorm	2003–04	Tercera División	37	8	2	1	—		3 (Note: Appearances in Tercera División play-offs)	1	42	10
Benidorm	Total		67	12	2	1	—		3	1	72	14
Gandía	2004–05	Tercera División	22	5	—		—		2	1	24	6
Benidorm	2005–06	Segunda División B	35	12	—		—		—		35	12
Benidorm	2006–07	Segunda División B	37	22	2	0	—		—		39	22
Benidorm	Total		72	34	2	0	—		—		74	34
Poli Ejido	2007–08	Segunda División	30	5	1	0	—		—		31	5
Poli Ejido	2008–09	Segunda División B	36	19	6	7	—		2 (Note: Appearances in Segunda División B play-offs)	0	44	26
Poli Ejido	Total		66	24	7	7	—		2	0	75	31
Elche	2009–10	Segunda División	38	26	1	1	—		—		39	27
Betis	2010–11	Segunda División	34	18	7	4	—		—		41	22
Betis	2011–12	La Liga	26	6	2	2	—		—		28	8
Betis	2012–13	La Liga	32	13	6	1	—		—		38	14
Betis	2013–14	La Liga	32	9	4	1	7 (Note: Appearances in UEFA Europa League)	2	—		43	12
Betis	2014–15	Segunda División	33	19	4	1	—		—		37	20
Betis	2015–16	La Liga	23	1	3	0	—		—		26	1
Betis	Total		180	66	26	9	7	2	—		213	77
Getafe	2016–17	Segunda División	39	20	1	0	—		4 (Note: Appearances in La Liga play-offs)	2	44	22
Getafe	2017–18	La Liga	36	7	0	0	—		—		36	7
Getafe	2018–19	La Liga	38	14	3	2	—		—		41	16
Getafe	2019–20	La Liga	34	5	2	1	6	1	—		42	7
Getafe	Total		147	46	6	3	6	1	4	2	163	52
Granada	2020–21	La Liga	33	8	4	4	14	3	—		51	15
Granada	2021–22	La Liga	35	10	2	2	—		—		37	12
Granada	2022–23	Segunda División	25	3	2	1	—		—		27	4
Granada	Total		93	21	8	7	14	3	—		115	31
Career total			713	246	52	28	27	6	11	4	803	284

== Honours ==
Betis

- Segunda División: 2010–11, 2014–15

Granada

- Segunda División: 2022–23

Individual

- Pichichi Trophy (Segunda División): 2009–10
