= Ángel Jiménez (footballer) =

Spanish footballer (born 2002)

Personal information
- Full name: Ángel Jiménez Gallego
- Date of birth: 22 June 2002 (age 24)
- Place of birth: Granada, Spain
- Height: 1.94 m (6 ft 4 in)
- Position: Goalkeeper

Team information
- Current team: Željezničar
- Number: 41

Youth career
- 2013–2021: Granada

Senior career*
Years	Team	Apps	(Gls)
2020–2023	Granada B	30	(0)
2020	Granada	1	(0)
2023–2026	Ponferradina	15	(0)
2026–	Željezničar	0	(0)
- * Club domestic league appearances and goals as of 19 April 2026

Ángel Jiménez Gallego (born 22 June 2002) is a Spanish professional footballer who plays as a goalkeeper for Bosnian Premier League club Željezničar.

== Club career ==
Born in Granada, Andalusia, Jiménez joined hometown side Granada CF's youth setup in 2013, aged just 11. On 8 November 2020, before even having appeared with the reserves, he made his first team – and La Liga – debut by starting and saving a penalty in a 0–2 away loss against Real Sociedad, as his side was heavily impacted by the COVID-19 pandemic; at the age of 18 years, four months and 16 days, he became the youngest player to debut in the top tier with the club, overcoming previous record holder Adalberto Peñaranda.

Jiménez subsequently featured exclusively for the B-team, helping in their promotion from Segunda Federación in 2023. On 2 August 2023, he signed for SD Ponferradina, freshly relegated to Primera Federación.

In July 2026, Jiménez joined Bosnian Premier League side Željezničar on a one-year deal.

== Career statistics ==
As of match played 19 April 2026

Appearances and goals by club, season and competition
Club	Season	League			National cup (Note: Includes Copa del Rey)		Other		Total	
Club	Season	Division	Apps	Goals	Apps	Goals	Apps	Goals	Apps	Goals
Granada B	2020–21	Segunda División B	2	0	—		—		2	0
Granada B	2021–22	Segunda Federación	7	0	—		—		7	0
Granada B	2022–23	Segunda Federación	21	0	—		2 (Note: Appearances in the 2023 Segunda Federación play-offs)	0	23	0
Granada B	Total		30	0	—		2	0	32	0
Granada	2020–21	La Liga	1	0	—		—		1	0
Ponferradina	2023–24	Primera Federación	0	0	1	0	—		1	0
Ponferradina	2024–25	Primera Federación	1	0	3	0	—		4	0
Ponferradina	2025–26	Primera Federación	14	0	1	0	—		15	0
Ponferradina	Total		15	0	5	0	—		20	0
Željezničar	2026–27	Bosnian Premier League	0	0	0	0	—		0	0
Career total			46	0	5	0	2	0	53	0
