= Rui Silva (footballer, born 1994) =

Portuguese footballer

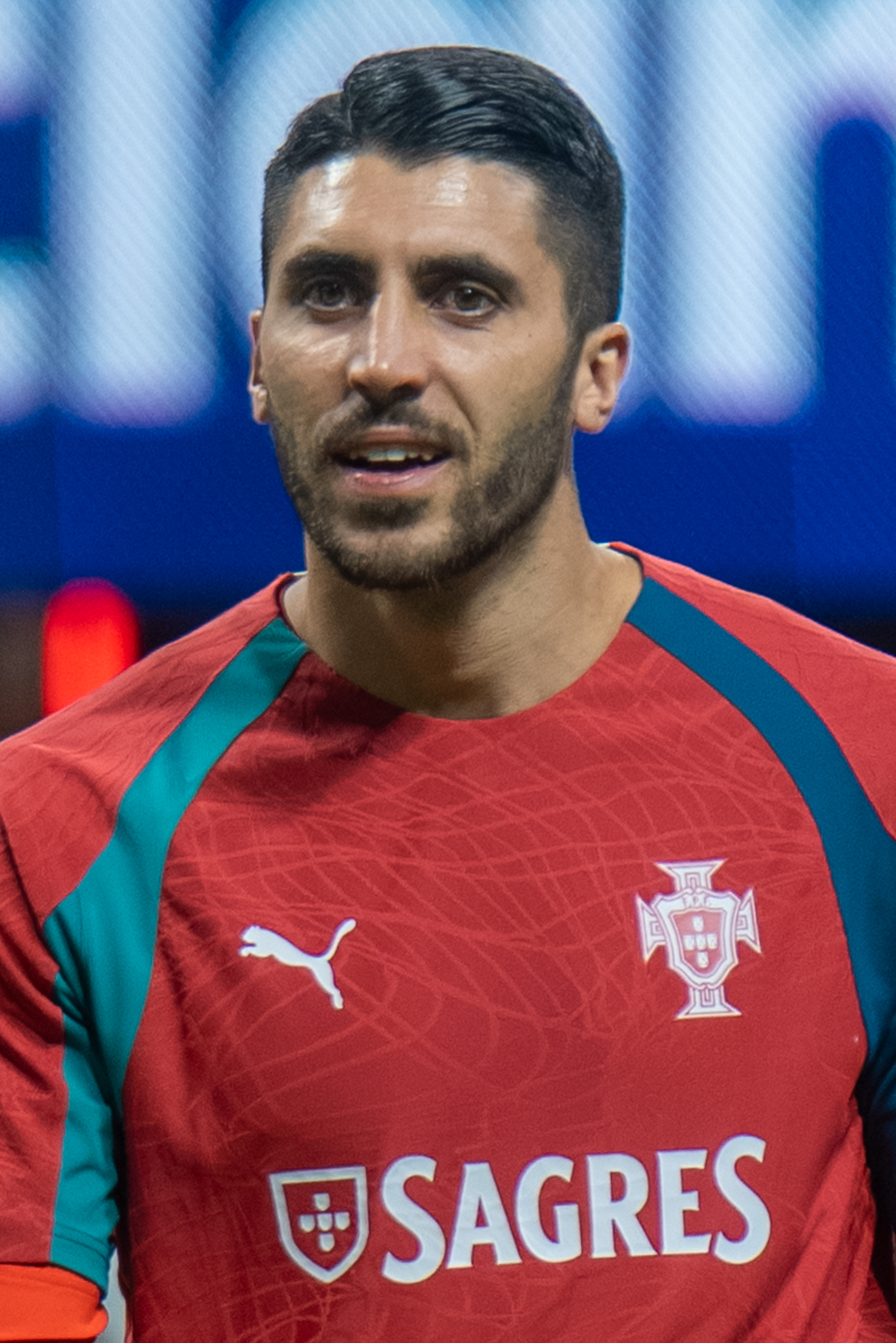
- Silva with Portugal in 2026

Personal information
- Full name: Rui Tiago Dantas da Silva
- Date of birth: 7 February 1994 (age 32)
- Place of birth: Águas Santas, Portugal
- Height: 1.91 m (6 ft 3 in)
- Position: Goalkeeper

Team information
- Current team: Sporting CP
- Number: 1

Youth career
- 2006–2012: Maia

Senior career*
Years	Team	Apps	(Gls)
2013−2017	Nacional	50	(0)
2017−2021	Granada	111	(0)
2021–2025	Betis	91	(0)
2025	→ Sporting CP (loan)	17	(0)
2025–	Sporting CP	40	(0)

International career^{‡}
2013	Portugal U19	3	(0)
2014	Portugal U20	2	(0)
2014	Portugal U21	1	(0)
2021–	Portugal	3	(0)
Medal record
Men's football
Representing Portugal
UEFA Nations League
Winner	2025 Germany
- * Club domestic league appearances and goals as of 22:10, 9 October 2026 (UTC) ‡ National team caps and goals as of 19:48, 6 June 2026 (UTC)

Rui Tiago Dantas da Silva (born 7 February 1994) is a Portuguese professional footballer who plays as a goalkeeper for Primeira Liga club Sporting CP and the Portugal national team.

== Club career ==
=== Nacional ===
Born in Águas Santas, Maia, Porto District, Silva began his development at Maia before completing it at Nacional, whom he joined in 2012. He made his professional debut on 26 January 2014 in a dead rubber Taça da Liga group match at Leixões, keeping a clean sheet in a 2–0 victory. His Primeira Liga debut came on 11 May in the final fixture away against Gil Vicente, giving away and conceding the penalty from which Diogo Viana scored the only goal.

Silva eventually became first choice for the Manuel Machado-led team, overtaking Brazilian Eduardo Gottardi.

=== Granada ===
On 27 January 2017, Silva signed a four-and-a-half-year contract at Spanish La Liga club Granada, as a replacement for Levante-bound Oier Olazábal. Costing €1.5 million, he was completely unused in his first season in which the Andalusians were relegated to the Segunda División, as Guillermo Ochoa was unchallenged.

Silva remained second choice, this time to Javi Varas, and debuted on 6 September 2017 in the second round of the Copa del Rey, a 3–0 away defeat to Real Zaragoza. He made four league appearances, the first being a 1–0 loss at Rayo Vallecano on 2 December while the veteran Spaniard was grieving the death of a family member.

Under new manager Diego Martínez, Silva became the starter and missed just two games as the Nazaríes finished second to Osasuna and won promotion in the 2018–19 campaign. He was given the Ricardo Zamora Trophy for best-performing goalkeeper in the league, and was also voted best in his position.

In 2020–21, Silva represented Granada in their debut European campaign, reaching the quarter-finals of the UEFA Europa League. He then chose to allow his contract to expire.

=== Betis ===
On 11 June 2021, Silva joined Real Betis on a five-year deal, effective as of 1 July. He started ahead of Claudio Bravo on his debut, a 1–1 draw away to Mallorca on 14 August. Having competed with the Chilean throughout his first season, he raised the possibility of leaving in April 2022; in the same month, he sat on the bench as the team won the Spanish Cup final.

=== Sporting CP ===
Silva was loaned to Sporting CP on 14 January 2025, in a return to Portugal; on 1 July, the club had an obligation to acquire on a permanent basis him for €4 million. The following month, he made his debut in the UEFA Champions League in a 3–0 loss to Borussia Dortmund in the knockout phase play-offs, and scored a bizarre own goal in the league against Arouca also at the Estádio José Alvalade (2–2).

== International career ==
Silva won his sole cap for the Portugal under-21 side on 13 November 2014, playing the full 90 minutes in a 3–1 away friendly defeat against England. In August 2020, he had his first senior call-up for UEFA Nations League matches against Croatia and Sweden the following month.

On 20 May 2021, Silva was selected by manager Fernando Santos for his UEFA Euro 2020 squad. He made his debut on 9 June in the last exhibition game before the tournament, playing the entire 4–0 win over Israel in Lisbon.

In October 2022, Silva was named in a preliminary 55-man squad for the 2022 FIFA World Cup in Qatar. He did not make the final cut, but was selected by Roberto Martínez for the following edition of the tournament.

== Career statistics ==
=== Club ===
As of match played 21 November 2026

Appearances and goals by club, season and competition
Club	Season	League			National cup (Note: Includes Taça de Portugal, Copa del Rey)		League cup (Note: Includes Taça da Liga)		Europe		Other		Total	
Club	Season	Division	Apps	Goals	Apps	Goals	Apps	Goals	Apps	Goals	Apps	Goals	Apps	Goals
Nacional	2013–14	Primeira Liga	1	0	0	0	1	0	—		—		1	0
Nacional	2014–15	Primeira Liga	9	0	0	0	2	0	0	0	—		11	0
Nacional	2015–16	Primeira Liga	22	0	1	0	0	0	—		—		23	0
Nacional	2016–17	Primeira Liga	18	0	1	0	0	0	—		—		19	0
Nacional	Total		50	0	2	0	3	0	0	0	—		55	0
Granada	2016–17	La Liga	0	0	0	0	—		—		—		0	0
Granada	2017–18	Segunda División	4	0	1	0	—		—		—		5	0
Granada	2018–19	Segunda División	40	0	0	0	—		—		—		40	0
Granada	2019–20	La Liga	35	0	2	0	—		—		—		37	0
Granada	2020–21	La Liga	32	0	0	0	—		14 (Note: Appearances in UEFA Europa League)	0	—		46	0
Granada	Total		111	0	3	0	—		14	0	—		128	0
Betis	2021–22	La Liga	22	0	3	0	—		7	0	—		32	0
Betis	2022–23	La Liga	26	0	0	0	—		2	0	0	0	28	0
Betis	2023–24	La Liga	28	0	3	0	—		6 (Note: Four appearances in UEFA Europa League, two appearances in UEFA Europa Conference League)	0	—		37	0
Betis	2024–25	La Liga	15	0	0	0	—		2 (Note: Appearances in UEFA Conference League)	0	—		17	0
Betis	Total		91	0	6	0	—		17	0	0	0	114	0
Sporting CP (loan)	2024–25	Primeira Liga	17	0	4	0	—		2 (Note: Appearances in UEFA Champions League)	0	—		23	0
Sporting CP	2025–26	Primeira Liga	32	0	3	0	1	0	11	0	1 (Note: Appearance in Supertaça Cândido de Oliveira)	0	48	0
Sporting CP	2026–27	Primeira Liga	8	0	1	0	1	0	2	0	—		12	0
Sporting CP	Sporting total		57	0	8	0	2	0	15	0	1	0	83	0
Career total			309	0	19	0	5	0	46	0	1	0	380	0

=== International ===
As of match played 6 June 2026

Appearances and goals by national team and year
National team	Year	Apps	Goals
Portugal	2021	1	0
Portugal	2022	0	0
Portugal	2023	0	0
Portugal	2024	0	0
Portugal	2025	0	0
Portugal	2026	2	0
Total		3	0

== Honours ==
Betis

- Copa del Rey: 2021–22

Sporting CP

- Primeira Liga: 2024–25
- Taça de Portugal: 2024–25

Portugal

- UEFA Nations League: 2024–25

Individual

- Segunda División Best Goalkeeper: 2018–19
- Ricardo Zamora Trophy: 2018–19 Segunda División
