= Isma Ruiz =

Spanish footballer (born 2001)

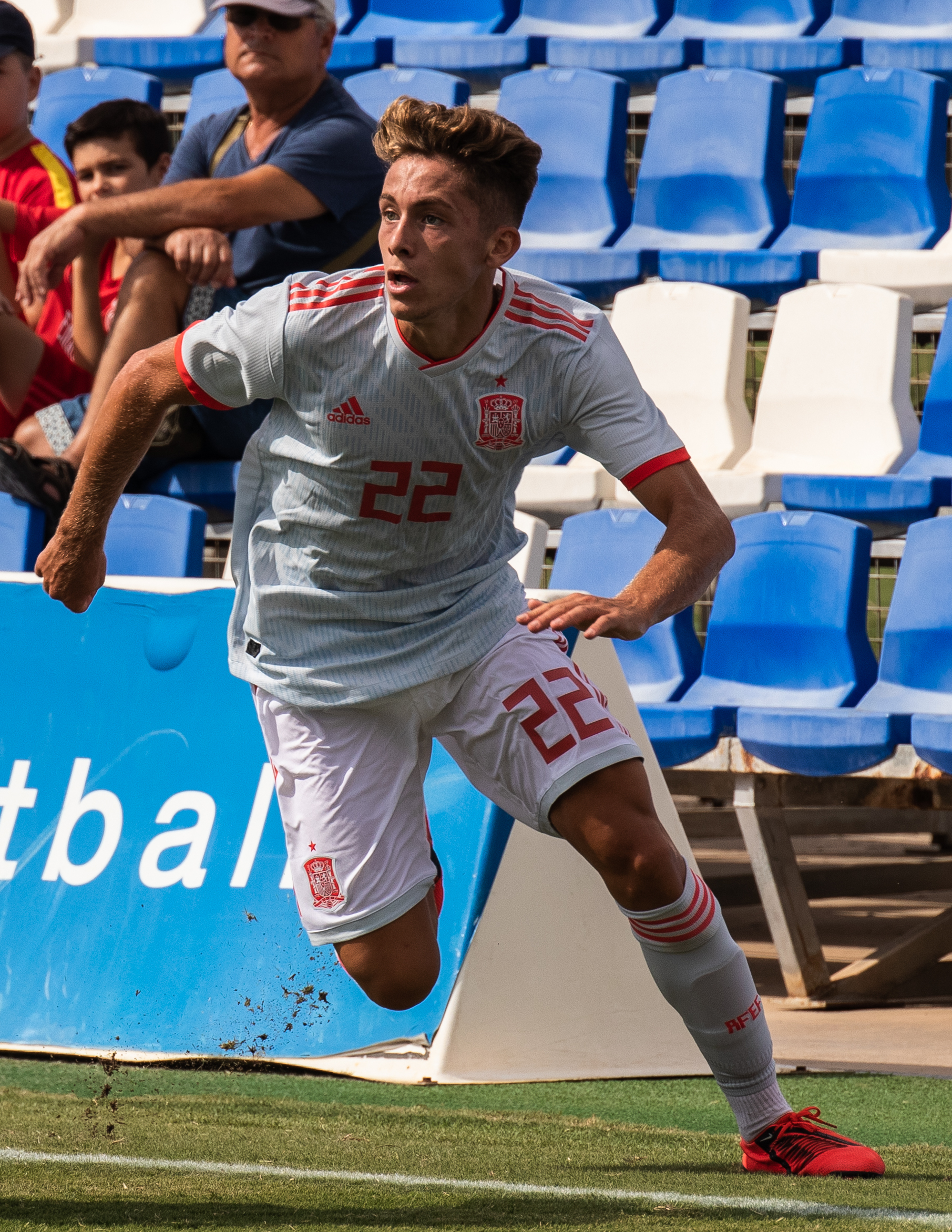

Personal information
- Full name: Ismael Ruiz Sánchez
- Date of birth: 14 February 2001 (age 25)
- Place of birth: Gójar, Spain
- Height: 1.80 m (5 ft 11 in)
- Position: Midfielder

Team information
- Current team: Córdoba
- Number: 8

Youth career
- 2008–2010: La Zubia
- 2010–2011: Ogíjares 89
- 2011–2013: Granada
- 2013–2014: Maracena
- 2014–2016: Santa Fe
- 2016–2019: Granada

Senior career*
Years	Team	Apps	(Gls)
2019–2021	Granada B	42	(1)
2019–2023	Granada	9	(0)
2022–2023	→ Ibiza (loan)	16	(0)
2023–	Córdoba	102	(5)

International career
2019	Spain U18	6	(0)
2019	Spain U19	2	(0)
2019	Spain U20	5	(0)
- * Club domestic league appearances and goals as of 6 June 2026

Ismael "Isma" Ruiz Sánchez (born 14 February 2001) is a Spanish professional footballer who plays as a central midfielder for Córdoba CF.

== Club career ==
Born in Gójar, Granada, Andalusia, Ruiz represented CA La Zubia, Ogíjares 89 CF, UD Maracena, CD Santa Fe and Granada CF as a youth. He made his senior debut with the latter's reserves on 17 March 2019, coming on as a second-half substitute in a 0–1 Segunda División B away loss against CD Badajoz.

On 19 July 2019, Ruiz renewed his contract until 2023, being definitely promoted to the B-side. He made his first team debut on 17 December, starting in a 3–2 away success over CE L'Hospitalet, for the season's Copa del Rey.

Ruiz made his La Liga debut on 8 November 2020, starting in a 0–2 away loss against Real Sociedad, as his side was heavily impacted by the COVID-19 pandemic. He scored his first senior goal ten days later, netting the B's equalizer in a 2–2 home draw against Sevilla Atlético.

Ruiz was a member of the first team squad during the 2021–22 season, as Granada suffered relegation from the top tier. On 19 August 2022, he moved to UD Ibiza in Segunda División on a one-year loan deal.

On 9 August 2023, Ruiz signed a three-year contract with Primera Federación side Córdoba CF.

== Career statistics ==
=== Club ===
As of match played 23 May 2021

Appearances and goals by club, season and competition
Club	Season	League			National Cup		Continental		Total	
Club	Season	Division	Apps	Goals	Apps	Goals	Apps	Goals	Apps	Goals
Granada B	2018–19	Segunda División B	3	0	—		—		3	0
Granada B	2019–20	Segunda División B	15	0	—		—		15	0
Granada B	2020–21	Segunda División B	24	1	—		—		24	1
Granada B	Total		42	1	0	0	0	0	42	1
Granada	2019–20	La Liga	0	0	1	0	—		1	0
Granada	2020–21	La Liga	1	0	2	0	1 (Note: Appearance(s) in UEFA Europa League)	0	4	0
Granada	Total		1	0	3	0	1	0	5	0
Career total			43	1	3	0	1	0	47	1
