= Pepe Sánchez (footballer) =

Spanish footballer (born 2000)

Personal information
- Full name: José Sánchez
- Date of birth: 19 January 2000 (age 26)
- Place of birth: Linares, Spain
- Height: 1.85 m (6 ft 1 in)
- Position: Centre back

Team information
- Current team: Albacete
- Number: 23

Youth career
- 2012–2013: Linares 2011
- 2013–2016: Jaén
- 2016–2019: Granada

Senior career*
| Years | Team | Apps | (Gls) |
| 2019–2022 | Granada B | 35 | (0) |
| 2019–2023 | Granada | 6 | (0) |
| 2023 | → Deportivo La Coruña (loan) | 7 | (1) |
| 2023–2024 | Ibiza | 26 | (1) |
| 2024– | Albacete | 35 | (2) |
- * Club domestic league appearances and goals as of 9 June 2026

José "Pepe" Sánchez (born 19 January 2000) is a Spanish professional footballer who plays as a central defender for Albacete Balompié.

== Career ==
Sánchez joined Granada CF's youth setup in 2016, after representing Real Jaén and Linares CF 2011. On 4 April 2019, while still a youth, he renewed his contract for two seasons.

Sánchez made his senior debut with the reserves on 3 November 2019, starting in a 2–1 Segunda División B away win against Recreativo de Huelva. He made his first team debut on 17 December, starting in a 3–2 away success over CE L'Hospitalet, for the season's Copa del Rey.

On 28 May 2020, Sánchez renewed his contract with the Nazaríes for a further campaign. He first appeared in the UEFA Europa League on 5 November by playing the full 90 minutes in a 2–0 away win against AC Omonia, and completed a trio of debuts three days later by starting in a 0–2 La Liga away loss against Real Sociedad.

On 27 January 2023, Sánchez was loaned to Primera Federación side Deportivo de La Coruña for the remainder of the season. On 26 July, he moved to fellow third division side UD Ibiza on a two-year contract.

Sánchez left the Celestes in the middle of 2024, and spent a period on trial at CD Castellón in September of that year. On 4 December 2024, he signed a contract with Albacete Balompié in the second division until 2026.

== Honours ==
Granada

- Segunda División: 2022–23
