= Kenedy (footballer) =

Brazilian footballer (born 1996)

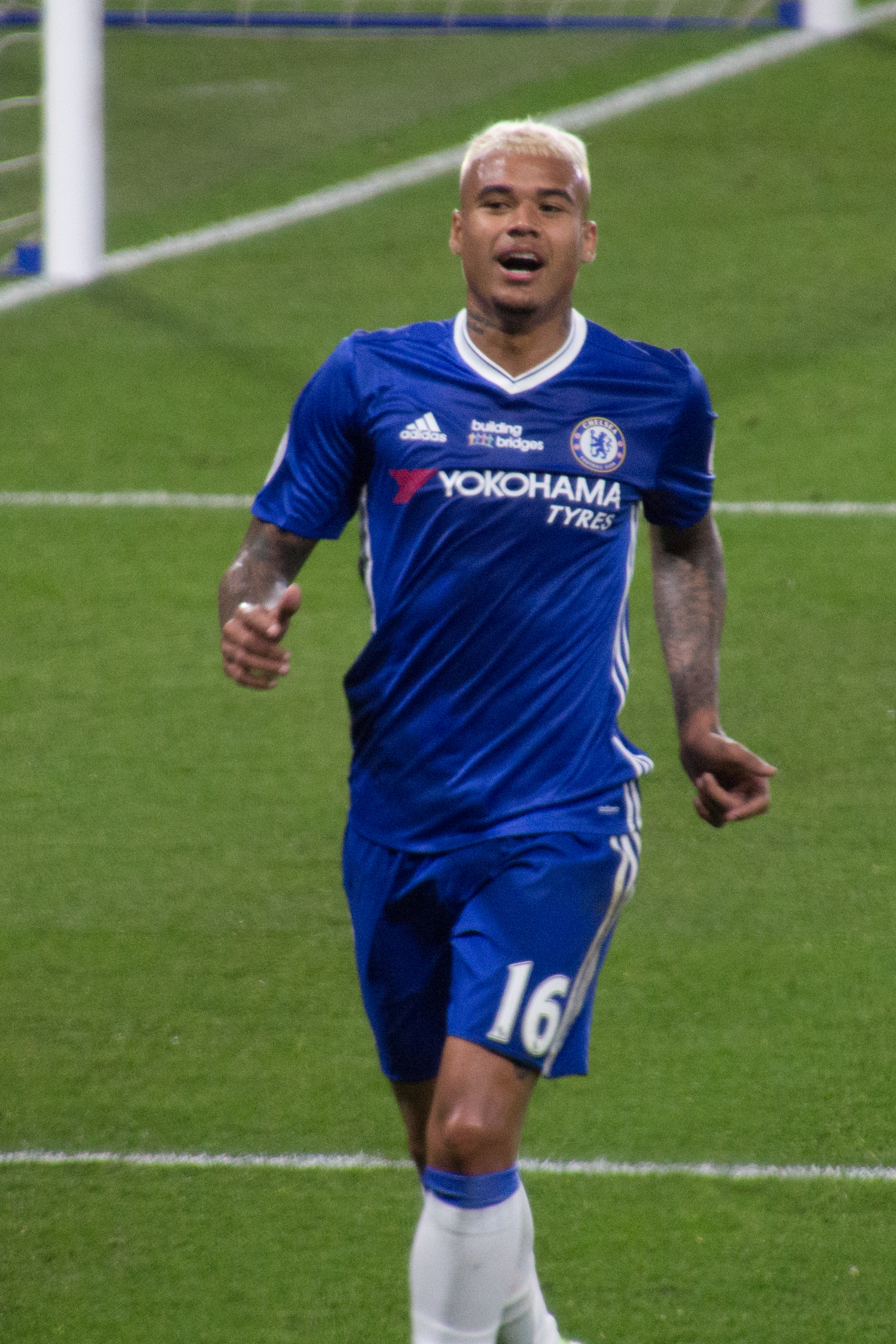
- Kenedy playing for Chelsea in 2017

Personal information
- Full name: Robert Kenedy Nunes do Nascimento
- Date of birth: 8 February 1996 (age 30)
- Place of birth: Santa Rita do Sapucaí, Brazil
- Height: 1.80 m (5 ft 11 in)
- Position: Left winger

Team information
- Current team: Pachuca
- Number: 29

Youth career
- 2006–2009: Vasco da Gama
- 2009–2013: Fluminense

Senior career*
Years	Team	Apps	(Gls)
2013–2015	Fluminense	40	(5)
2015–2022	Chelsea	16	(1)
2016-2017	→ Watford (loan)	1	(0)
2018–2019	→ Newcastle United (loan)	38	(3)
2019–2020	→ Getafe (loan)	19	(1)
2020–2021	→ Granada (loan)	28	(4)
2021–2022	→ Flamengo (loan)	14	(1)
2022–2026	Valladolid	43	(2)
2025–2026	→ Pachuca (loan)	34	(9)
2026–	Pachuca	7	(1)

International career
2012–2013	Brazil U17	13	(6)
2015	Brazil U20	7	(1)
2015	Brazil U23	2	(0)
- * Club domestic league appearances and goals as of 12 September 2026

Robert Kenedy Nunes do Nascimento (born 8 February 1996), known as Kenedy, is a Brazilian professional footballer who plays as a left winger for Liga MX club Pachuca.

Kenedy made his professional debut aged 17 for Fluminense, scoring five goals in 40 official games before a £6.3 million move to Chelsea in 2015. Kenedy has represented Brazil at under-17 and under-20 levels.

== Club career ==
=== Early career ===
Born in Santa Rita do Sapucaí, Minas Gerais, Kenedy is named after Robert F. Kennedy. He began his career at local club Santarritense before moving to Friburguense in Rio de Janeiro state at the age of 11, going on to Vasco da Gama and Atlético Mineiro before arriving at Fluminense.

=== Fluminense ===
Kenedy made his professional debut on 28 July 2013 in a 2–0 Série A defeat at Grêmio, replacing Wágner for the final nine minutes. On 24 May 2014, he scored his first professional goal, the only one in an away win over Esporte Clube Bahia. He netted his second goal for the club in September, a late equaliser against Cruzeiro.

In March 2015, Kenedy scored in three home victories for Flu in that year's Campeonato Carioca. On 18 April, in the tournament's semi-final, he missed their first attempt as they lost 9–8 in a penalty shootout to Botafogo.

=== Chelsea ===
==== 2015–16 season ====
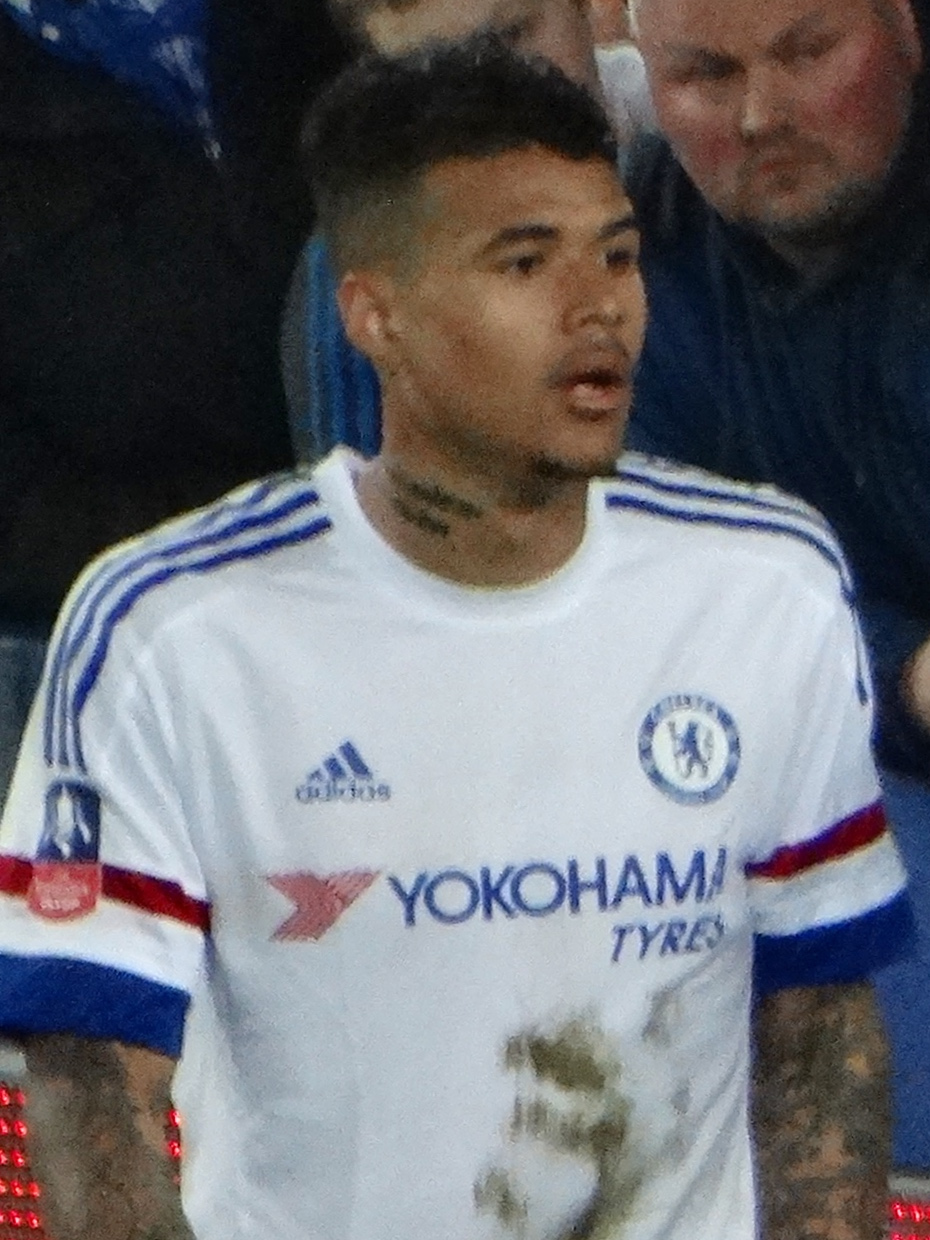
Kenedy playing for Chelsea in 2016

On 26 June 2015, Fluminense announced that Kenedy had been sold to an unnamed club for a fee around the region of £6.3 million. It was later confirmed that Kenedy was on trial at Chelsea, where he played in a pre-season match against Barcelona, after Kenedy was given permission from Fluminense to play in the game as he had not yet been formally signed. On 22 August 2015, Chelsea completed the transfer.

A week later, Kenedy made his debut against Crystal Palace, coming on as a 68th-minute substitute for César Azpilicueta in a 2–1 home defeat. He scored his first goal for the club on 23 September in the third round of the League Cup at Walsall, also assisting compatriot Ramires in the 4–1 victory; his first league goal was the following 1 March, a 39th-second effort in a 2–1 win at Norwich City that was the fastest goal of the season.

==== Loan to Watford ====
On 30 August 2016, Kenedy joined Watford on a season-long loan after having a bid accepted from Chelsea. On 26 September, he made his only appearance for the Hornets in a 2–0 away defeat against Burnley, replacing Roberto Pereyra with 15 minutes remaining. After struggling with injuries, manager Walter Mazzarri, confirmed that Kenedy had returned to Chelsea on 12 December after a disappointing loan spell.

==== 2016–17 season ====
After being recalled by Chelsea from his loan spell with Watford, Kenedy made his return for the Blues in their 4–0 home victory over Brentford in their FA Cup fourth round tie. Retaining his number 16 jersey, Kenedy replaced César Azpilicueta with just under twenty minutes remaining. He made his first start under Conte against Watford on 15 May 2017.

==== 2017–18 season ====
During a pre-season tour of China, Kenedy caused controversy by posting two inflammatory videos on social media, one captioned "Porra china", roughly translating to "Fuck China", and the other of a sleeping Chinese security guard captioned "Acorda china. Vacilão", translating to "Wake up China. You idiot". The incident was met with uproar by Chinese fans and media. As a result, Kenedy was sent back to England for damaging relationships with the Asian fan base. Both Kenedy and Chelsea later issued apologies over the incident and the club stated that the player had been "strongly reprimanded and disciplined". Following the incident, Chinese media outlets were ordered to withdraw stories related to Chelsea from homepages and apps and the Ministry of Foreign Affairs confirmed that there was a remote possibility of a ban for the club.

In August, a loan to Newcastle United fell through on transfer deadline day. On 20 September 2017, Kenedy made his first appearance since the incident during pre-season when he started against Nottingham Forest in the League Cup. He scored the opener in a 5–1 victory.

==== Loans to Newcastle United ====
On 23 January 2018, Kenedy joined Newcastle United on loan for the remainder of the 2017–18 season. Kenedy impressed on his Newcastle debut, creating Jamaal Lascelles opener from a corner kick in a 1–1 draw with Burnley. On 10 March, Kenedy won the Man of the Match award after scoring a brace in Newcastle's 3–0 win against Southampton. Kenedy provided an assist for Ayoze Perez's 80th-minute winner in Newcastle's 1–0 victory against Huddersfield on 31 March.

He returned to Tyneside on loan for the 2018–19 season. Kenedy had a particularly poor match in a goalless draw at Cardiff City on 18 August, he avoided a red card for a kick at Víctor Camarasa, became the first player since 2010 to play a full Premier League first half without completing a pass and his penalty in added time to win the game was saved by Neil Etheridge. On 6 October, Kenedy scored his first goal of the season in a 3–2 loss at Manchester United.

==== Loan to Getafe ====
On 2 September 2019, Kenedy was loaned to La Liga side Getafe CF for the 2019–20 season. On 3 November 2019, he scored his first league goal of the season in a 1–0 win over Celta Vigo.

==== Loan to Granada ====
On 8 September 2020, Kenedy returned to Spain with Granada on loan until the end of 2020–21 season. He made his club debut as a substitute on 12 September 2020, in a 2–0 win against Athletic Bilbao.

==== Loan to Flamengo ====
On 18 August 2021, Kenedy extended his contract with Chelsea and returned to Brazil on loan with Flamengo until July 2022. He was recalled by Chelsea in January 2022 due to an injury to Ben Chilwell.

==== 2021–22 season ====
Kenedy made his first Chelsea appearance in over four years when he started in a 3–2 win over Luton Town in the FA Cup on 2 March 2022. He also played in the next round against Middlesbrough later that month. On the final day of the season, he made his first league appearance for the Blues in five years, starting in a 2–1 win over Watford.

=== Valladolid ===
In September 2022, Kenedy joined La Liga club Real Valladolid for an undisclosed fee.

=== Pachuca ===
In May 2025, Kenedy joined Mexican club Pachuca on a one-year loan. A year later, the move became permanent.

== International career ==
Kenedy scored six goals in eight games for Brazil under-17s as they came third at the 2013 South American Championship in Argentina.

Kenedy originally named as part of the Brazil under-20 squad for the 2015 World Cup in New Zealand, but missed the tournament with appendicitis, being replaced by Malcom as the team ended as runners-up.

== Style of play ==
An NBC Sports article by Nicholas Mendola in 2018 credited Kenedy's versatility, stating "The Brazilian left-sided man can play virtually any field position besides center back".

== Career statistics ==
As of match played on 21 December 2023

Appearances and goals by club, season and competition
Club	Season	League			State League (Note: Includes Campeonato Carioca)		National cup (Note: Includes Copa do Brasil, FA Cup, Copa del Rey)		League cup (Note: Includes EFL Cup)		Continental		Other		Total	
Club	Season	Division	Apps	Goals	Apps	Goals	Apps	Goals	Apps	Goals	Apps	Goals	Apps	Goals	Apps	Goals
Fluminense	2013	Série A	9	0	—		—		—		—		—		9	0
Fluminense	2014	Série A	20	2	0	0	1	0	—		1 (Note: Appearance in Copa Sudamericana)	0	—		22	2
Fluminense	2015	Série A	1	0	10	3	0	0	—		—		—		11	3
Fluminense	Total		30	2	10	3	1	0	—		1	0	—		42	5
Chelsea	2015–16	Premier League	14	1	—		2	0	2	1	2 (Note: Appearances in UEFA Champions League)	0	—		20	2
Chelsea	2016–17	Premier League	1	0	—		1	0	0	0	—		—		2	0
Chelsea	2017–18	Premier League	0	0	—		2	0	3	1	0	0	—		5	1
Chelsea	2019–20	Premier League	0	0	—		0	0	0	0	0	0	0	0	0	0
Chelsea	2020–21	Premier League	0	0	—		0	0	0	0	0	0	0	0	0	0
Chelsea	2021–22	Premier League	1	0	—		2	0	0	0	0	0	0	0	3	0
Chelsea	Total		16	1	—		7	0	5	2	2	0	0	0	30	3
Watford (loan)	2016–17	Premier League	1	0	—		0	0	0	0	—		—		1	0
Newcastle United (loan)	2017–18	Premier League	13	2	—		—		—		—		—		13	2
Newcastle United (loan)	2018–19	Premier League	25	1	—		2	0	1	0	—		—		28	1
Newcastle United (loan)	Total		38	3	—		2	0	1	0	—		—		41	3
Getafe (loan)	2019–20	La Liga	19	1	—		0	0	—		8 (Note: Appearances in UEFA Europa League)	2	—		27	3
Granada (loan)	2020–21	La Liga	28	4	—		4	2	—		12	2	—		44	8
Flamengo (loan)	2021	Série A	14	1	—		2	0	—		1 (Note: Appearance in Copa Libertadores)	0	—		17	1
Real Valladolid	2022–23	La Liga	12	0	—		1	0	—		—		—		13	0
Real Valladolid	2023–24	Segunda División	18	2	—		0	0	—		—		—		18	2
Real Valladolid	Total		30	2	0	0	1	0	0	0	0	0	0	0	31	2
Career total			176	14	10	3	17	2	6	2	24	4	0	0	233	25

== Honours ==
Chelsea

- Premier League: 2016–17
- FIFA Club World Cup: 2021

Individual

- Liga MX Best XI: Clausura 2026
