= Zé Pedro =

Zé Pedro may refer to:

- Zé Pedro (footballer, born 1978), José Pedro Alves Salazar, Portuguese football midfielder and manager
- Zé Pedro (footballer, born 1981), José Pedro Marques de Freitas, Portuguese football midfielder
- Zé Pedro (footballer, born 1991), José Pedro Cepeda Espinhosa Teixeira, Portuguese football centre-back
- Zé Pedro (footballer, born 1992), José Pedro Costa Amorim Cerqueira, Portuguese football forward
- Zé Pedro (footballer, born 1993), José Pedro Cruz Sousa Neto, Portuguese football left-back
- Zé Pedro (footballer, born January 1997), José Pedro Ferreira Costa Leite, Portuguese football winger
- Zé Pedro (footballer, born June 1997), José Pedro da Silva Figueiredo Freitas, Portuguese football centre-back
- Zé Pedro (musician) (1956–2017), Portuguese composer, musician, guitarist and founder of the rock band Xutos & Pontapés
