= 2023–24 Granada CF season =

Granada CF
2023–24 season
- President: Sophia Yang
- Head coach: Paco López (until 26 November); Alexander Medina (from 27 November to 19 March); José Ramón Sandoval (from 19 March)
- Stadium: Nuevo Estadio de Los Cármenes
- La Liga: 20th (relegated)
- Copa del Rey: First round
- Top goalscorer: League: Myrto Uzuni (11); All: Myrto Uzuni (11)
- Biggest win: Granada 3–0 Osasuna
- Biggest defeat: Girona 7–0 Granada
Home colours	Away colours	Third colours

The 2023–24 season was Granada Club de Fútbol's 93rd season in existence and first season back in La Liga. They also competed in the Copa del Rey.

== Players ==
=== First-team squad ===
As of 1 February 2024

Note: Flags indicate national team as defined under FIFA eligibility rules; some limited exceptions apply. Players may hold more than one non-FIFA nationality.

No.	Pos.	Nation	Player
1	GK	ESP	Raúl Fernández
2	DF	URU	Bruno Méndez
3	DF	FRA	Faitout Maouassa (on loan from Club Brugge)
4	DF	ESP	Miguel Rubio
5	DF	ESP	Jesús Vallejo (on loan from Real Madrid)
6	MF	CMR	Martin Hongla
7	FW	ARG	Lucas Boyé
8	FW	URU	Matías Arezo
9	FW	ESP	José Callejón
10	FW	ESP	Antonio Puertas
11	FW	ALB	Myrto Uzuni
12	DF	ESP	Ricard Sánchez
13	GK	ESP	Marc Martínez
14	DF	ESP	Ignasi Miquel

No.	Pos.	Nation	Player
15	DF	ESP	Carlos Neva (vice-captain)
16	DF	ESP	Víctor Díaz (captain)
17	FW	CAN	Theo Corbeanu
18	FW	POL	Kamil Jóźwiak
19	FW	URU	Facundo Pellistri (on loan from Manchester United)
20	MF	ESP	Sergio Ruiz
21	MF	ESP	Óscar Melendo
22	DF	POL	Kamil Piątkowski (on loan from Red Bull Salzburg)
23	MF	ESP	Gerard Gumbau
24	MF	ESP	Gonzalo Villar
25	GK	ARG	Augusto Batalla (on loan from River Plate)
28	DF	ESP	Raúl Torrente
31	GK	ESP	Adri López

=== Reserve team ===
Note: Flags indicate national team as defined under FIFA eligibility rules; some limited exceptions apply. Players may hold more than one non-FIFA nationality.

No.	Pos.	Nation	Player
27	MF	ESP	Mario González
32	DF	ESP	Miki Bosch
33	FW	ESP	Pablo Sáenz
34	GK	ESP	Pol Tristán

No.	Pos.	Nation	Player
35	GK	ESP	Fran Árbol
36	MF	CIV	Lass Sangaré
37	FW	NGR	Eghosa Bello

=== Out on loan ===
Note: Flags indicate national team as defined under FIFA eligibility rules; some limited exceptions apply. Players may hold more than one non-FIFA nationality.

No.	Pos.	Nation	Player
—	GK	POR	André Ferreira (on loan at Valladolid until 30 June 2024)
—	DF	SEN	Alpha Diounkou (on loan at AEK Larnaca until 30 June 2024)
—	MF	ESP	Alberto Soro (on loan at Vizela until 30 June 2024)
—	MF	ESP	Víctor Meseguer (on loan at Valladolid until 30 June 2024)

No.	Pos.	Nation	Player
—	MF	SRB	Njegoš Petrović (on loan at Vojvodina until 30 June 2024)
—	FW	SEN	Famara Diédhiou (on loan at Cardiff City until 30 June 2024)
—	FW	ISR	Shon Weissman (on loan at Salernitana until 30 June 2024)
—	FW	ESP	Bryan Zaragoza (on loan at Bayern Munich until 30 June 2024)

== Transfers ==
=== In ===
Pos.	Player	Transferred from	Fee	Date	Source
FW	(Senegal) Famara Diédhiou	(Turkey) Alanyaspor	€500,000	1 July 2023	
MF	(Spain) Jesús Vallejo	(Spain) Real Madrid	Loan	15 July 2023	
MF	(Spain) Gerard Gumbau	(Spain) Elche	Free	27 July 2023	
MF	(Spain) Gonzalo Villar	(Italy) Roma	€1,800,000	4 August 2023	
DF	(Portugal) Wilson Manafá	(Portugal) Porto	Free	7 August 2023	
FW	(Argentina) Lucas Boyé	(Spain) Elche	€7,000,000	30 August 2023	
MF	(Spain) Álvaro Carreras	(England) Manchester United	Loan	1 September 2023	
DF	(Uruguay) Bruno Méndez	(Brazil) Corinthians	Free	1 January 2024	
GK	(Argentina) Augusto Batalla	(Argentina) River Plate	Loan	3 January 2024	
DF	(Poland) Kamil Piątkowski	(Austria) Red Bull Salzburg	Loan	5 January 2024	
MF	(Cameroon) Martin Hongla	(Italy) Hellas Verona	Undisclosed	12 January 2024	
MF	(Uruguay) Facundo Pellistri	(England) Manchester United	Loan	31 January 2024	

=== Out ===
Pos.	Player	Transferred to	Fee	Date	Source
FW	(Spain) Jorge Molina	Retired		1 July 2023	
DF	(Spain) Quini	(Greece) Olympiacos	Free	11 July 2023	
MF	(Spain) Isma Ruiz	(Spain) Córdoba	Free	9 August 2023	
FW	(Spain) Samu Omorodion	(Spain) Atlético Madrid	€6,000,000	21 August 2023	
FW	(Spain) Antoñín	(Spain) Lugo	Free	28 August 2023	
MF	(Spain) Alberto Soro	(Portugal) Vizela	Loan	31 August 2023	
DF	(Senegal) Alpha Dionkou	(Cyprus) AEK Larnaca	Loan	1 September 2023	
MF	(France) Yann Bodiger	(Spain) Tenerife	Free	1 September 2023	
MF	(Spain) Álvaro Carreras	(England) Manchester United	Loan return	14 January 2024	
DF	(Portugal) Wilson Manafá	(China) Shanghai Shenhua	€150,000	28 January 2024	
MF	(Spain) Bryan Zaragoza	(Germany) Bayern Munich	Loan (€4,000,000)	1 February 2024	

== Pre-season and friendlies ==
Win Draw Loss

19 July 2023 Friendly	Granada	3–1	San Fernando	Granada
19:00 CEST (UTC+2)				Stadium: Ciudad Deportiva Granada CF; Attendance: 0

22 July 2023 Friendly	Granada	8–0	El Ejido	Granada
10:00 CEST (UTC+2)	Zaragoza 13', 43'; Uzuni 22'; Rubio 32'; Bodiger 45'; Samu 45+4'; González 65'; Meseguer 75'			Stadium: Ciudad Deportiva Granada CF; Referee: Pedro Rubio

26 July 2023 Friendly	Atlético Sanluqueño	0–1	Granada	Sanlúcar de Barrameda
19:30 CEST (UTC+2)			Samu 84'	Stadium: Estadio El Palmar; Attendance: 2,500; Referee: Mario Melero López

29 July 2023 Friendly	Granada	2–0	AD Ceuta	Cádiz
09:30 CEST (UTC+2)				Stadium: Montecastillo

2 August 2023 Friendly	Granada	2–1	Getafe	Puertollano
19:45 CEST (UTC+2)				Stadium: Estadio Ciudad de Puertollano

5 August 2023 Friendly	Almería	1–0	Granada	Almería
20:00 CEST (UTC+2)	Suárez 44' (pen.)		Gumbau (red card) 73'	Stadium: Power Horse Stadium; Attendance: 7,810; Referee: Sánchez Martínez

== Competitions ==
=== Overall record ===
Competition	First match	Last match	Starting round	Final position	Record							
Competition	First match	Last match	Starting round	Final position	Pld	W	D	L	GF	GA	GD	Win %
La Liga	14 August 2023	24 May 2024	Matchday 1	20th	38	4	9	25	38	79	−41	10.53
Copa del Rey	2 November 2023		First round	First round	1	0	0	1	0	3	−3	0.00
Total					39	4	9	26	38	82	−44	10.26

Source: Soccerway

=== La Liga ===
==== League table ====
Pos	Team	Pld	W	D	L	GF	GA	GD	Pts	Qualification or relegation
16	Las Palmas	38	10	10	18	33	47	−14	40 (Note: Mallorca finished ahead of Las Palmas on head-to-head points: Las Palmas 1–1 Mallorca, Mallorca 1–0 Las Palmas.)	
17	Rayo Vallecano	38	8	14	16	29	48	−19	38	
18	Cádiz (R)	38	6	15	17	26	55	−29	33	Relegation to Segunda División
19	Almería (R)	38	3	12	23	43	75	−32	21 (Note: Tied on head-to-head points. Almería finished ahead of Granada on overall goal difference.)	Relegation to Segunda División
20	Granada (R)	38	4	9	25	38	79	−41	21	Relegation to Segunda División

Source: LaLiga EA Sports
Rules for classification: 1) Points; 2) Head-to-head points; 3) Head-to-head goal difference; 4) Goal difference; 5) Goals scored; 6) Fair-play points
(Note: Head-to-head record is used only after all the matches between the teams in question have been played)
(R) Relegation

==== Results summary ====
Overall								Home						Away					
Pld	W	D	L	GF	GA	GD	Pts	W	D	L	GF	GA	GD	W	D	L	GF	GA	GD
38	4	9	25	38	79	−41	21	4	6	9	24	32	−8	0	3	16	14	47	−33

Source: La Liga

==== Results by round ====
Round	1	2	3	4	5	6	7	8	9	10	11	12	13	14	15	16	17	18	19	20	21	22	23	24	25	26	27	28	29	30	31	32	33	34	35	36	37	38
Ground	A	H	H	A	H	A	H	A	H	A	H	A	H	A	A	H	A	H	H	A	H	A	H	A	H	H	A	H	A	A	H	A	H	A	H	A	H	A
Result	L	L	W	L	L	L	D	D	D	L	L	L	D	L	L	D	L	L	W	L	L	L	D	D	D	L	L	L	L	L	W	D	W	L	L	L	L	L
Position	17	20	15	16	18	19	19	19	19	19	19	19	19	19	19	19	19	19	19	19	19	19	19	19	19	19	19	19	19	19	19	19	19	19	19	19	19	20

Source: La Liga
A = Away; H = Home; W = Win; D = Draw; L = Loss

==== Matches ====
The league fixtures were unveiled on 22 June 2023.

14 August 2023 1	Atlético Madrid	3–1	Granada	Madrid
21:30 CEST (UTC+2)	Hermoso (yellow card) 39'; Morata (yellow card) 42', (goal) 45+4'; Depay 67'; Azpilicueta (yellow card) 90+4'; Llorente 90+8'	Report	Gumbau (yellow card) 10'; Omorodion 62'	Stadium: Cívitas Metropolitano; Attendance: 56,164; Referee: Juan Luis Pulido Santana

21 August 2023 2	Granada	0–2	Rayo Vallecano	Granada
21:30 CEST (UTC+2)	Sánchez (yellow card) 11'; Gumbau (yellow card) 50'; Puertas (red card) 86'	Report	Hernández (yellow card) 50'; García 75'; Ciss 79'	Stadium: Nuevo Los Cármenes; Attendance: 17,338; Referee: Pablo González Fuertes

26 August 2023 3	Granada	3–2	Mallorca	Granada
19:30 CEST (UTC+2)	Miguel Ángel 12'; Melendo (yellow card) 16'; Ruiz (yellow card) 41'; Zaragoza 46'; Uzuni 70' (pen.)	Report	Muriqi (penalty missed) 18'; Copete (yellow card) 33'; Abdón 38'; Rajković (yellow card) 41'; Rodríguez (yellow card) 45+2'; González (yellow card) 51'; Larin (yellow card) 68'; S. Costa 87'; Maffeo (yellow card) 90+4'; Llabrés (yellow card) 90+4'	Stadium: Nuevo Los Cármenes; Attendance: 16,368; Referee: Francisco José Hernández Maeso

2 September 2023 4	Real Sociedad	5–3	Granada	San Sebastián
14:00 CEST (UTC+2)	Kubo 9', 44'; Oyarzabal (yellow card) 54'; Zubimendi 59'; Barrenetxea 67'; Bosch 76' (o.g.)	Report	Le Normand 35' (o.g.); Boyé (yellow card) 38', (goal) 83'; Ruiz (yellow card) 53'; Díaz (yellow card) 54'; Zaragoza (yellow card) 86', (goal) 90+9'	Stadium: Reale Arena; Attendance: 25,335; Referee: Guillermo Cuadra Fernández

18 September 2023 5	Granada	2–4	Girona	Granada
21:00 CEST (UTC+2)	Uzuni (yellow card) 23', (goal) 63'; Melendo (yellow card) 33'; Torrente (yellow card) 70'; Boyé 85'	Report	Tsyhankov 22'; Sávio 31'; López 34'; Couto (yellow card) 72', (goal) 89'; Juanpe (yellow card) 90+4'; Herrera (yellow card) 90+7'	Stadium: Nuevo Los Cármenes; Attendance: 17,323; Referee: Isidro Díaz de Mera Escuderos

24 September 2023 6	Las Palmas	1–0	Granada	Las Palmas
17:30 WEST (UTC+1)	Suárez (yellow card) 41'; Marmol (yellow card) 42' (yellow-red card) 58'; Araujo (yellow card) 43'; Mfulu (yellow card) 58'; Kaba (yellow card) 80'; Rodríguez 90+2'	Report	Gumbau (yellow card) 7'; Villar (yellow card) 70'; Sánchez (yellow card) 82'; Álvaro Carreras (yellow card) 89'	Stadium: Estadio Gran Canaria; Attendance: 24,848; Referee: Ricardo De Burgos Bengoetxea

28 September 2023 7	Granada	1–1	Real Betis	Granada
19:00 CEST (UTC+2)	Gumbau (yellow card) 3'; Boyé 67'; Miquel (yellow card) 74'	Report	Diao 51'; Ruibal (yellow card) 88'	Stadium: Nuevo Los Cármenes; Attendance: 18,936; Referee: Víctor García Verdura

1 October 2023 8	Almería	3–3	Granada	Almería
14:00 CEST (UTC+2)	Suárez 21', 44', 45+1'; Puigmal (yellow card) 65'; Akieme (yellow card) 82'	Report	Puertas (penalty missed) 56'; Zaragoza 66'; Sánchez 70'; Uzuni 86'; Villar (yellow card) 88'	Stadium: Power Horse Stadium; Attendance: 14,264; Referee: Pablo González Fuertes

8 October 2023 9	Granada	2–2	Barcelona	Granada
21:00 CEST (UTC+2)	Zaragoza 1', 29'; Miquel (yellow card) 66'; Miguel Ángel (yellow card) 68'; Vallejo (yellow card) 86'; Neva (yellow card) 90+8'	Report	Yamal 45+1'; Roberto 85'; Cancelo (yellow card) 90+8'	Stadium: Nuevo Los Cármenes; Attendance: 20,354; Referee: César Soto Grado

20 October 2023 10	Osasuna	2–0	Granada	Pamplona
21:00 CEST (UTC+2)	Budimir 11', 59' (pen.); Peña (yellow card) 65'; Oroz (yellow card) 79'; Ibáñez (yellow card) 84'	Report	Zaragoza (yellow card) 42'; Miquel (yellow card) 48'; Gumbau (yellow card) 54'; Ferreira (yellow card) 58'; Boyé (red card) 76'	Stadium: El Sadar; Attendance: 19,739; Referee: Mateo Busquets Ferrer

30 October 2023 11	Granada	2–3	Villarreal	Granada
21:00 CET (UTC+1)	Sánchez 29'; Uzuni 34'	Report	Gerard 18', 23' (pen.); Sørloth 28'; Baena (yellow card) 50'; Albiol (yellow card) 68'; Romero (yellow card) 73'; Parejo (yellow card) 90'	Stadium: Nuevo Los Cármenes; Attendance: 16,638; Referee: Javier Iglesias Villanueva

5 November 2023 12	Valencia	1–0	Granada	Valencia
16:15 CET (UTC+1)	Pepelu 45+7' (pen.); Guerra (yellow card) 51'; Gabriel (yellow card) 58'; López (yellow card) 83'	Report	Gumbau (yellow card) 12'; Sánchez (yellow card) 40'; Torrente (yellow card) 45+6'; Villar (yellow card) 78'; Zaragoza (yellow card) 90'	Stadium: Mestalla; Attendance: 44,922; Referee: Víctor García Verdura

11 November 2023 13	Granada	1–1	Getafe	Granada
18:30 CET (UTC+1)	Boyé (yellow card) 39'; Villar 45+4'; Neva (yellow card) 56'; Zaragoza (yellow card) 72'; Manafá (yellow card) 80'	Report	Mayoral 2'; Aleñá (yellow card) 41'; Óscar (yellow card) 84'	Stadium: Nuevo Los Cármenes; Attendance: 18,103; Referee: Alejandro Muñiz Ruiz

24 November 2023 14	Alavés	3–1	Granada	Vitoria-Gasteiz
21:00 CET (UTC+1)	Guevara (yellow card) 9'; Torrente 11' (o.g.); Rebbach 38'; Omorodion 55'	Report	Villar (yellow card) 16'; Boyé (yellow card) 59'; Uzuni 86' (pen.); Sánchez (yellow card) 87'	Stadium: Mendizorrotza; Attendance: 15,705; Referee: Javier Alberola Rojas

2 December 2023 15	Real Madrid	2–0	Granada	Madrid
18:30 CET (UTC+1)	Bellingham (yellow card) 22'; Rüdiger (yellow card) 22'; Brahim 26'; Rodrygo 57'	Report	Gumbau (yellow card) 77'	Stadium: Santiago Bernabéu; Attendance: 70,685; Referee: Pablo González Fuertes

10 December 2023 16	Granada	1–1	Athletic Bilbao	Granada
16:15 CET (UTC+1)	Ruiz de Galarreta 55' (o.g.)	Report	I. Williams 6'; N. Williams (yellow card) 78'; Berchiche (yellow card) 90'	Stadium: Nuevo Los Cármenes; Attendance: 12,849; Referee: Miguel Ángel Ortiz Arias
Note: The match was abandoned after 18 minutes due to the death of a spectator in the stadium, and resumed the following day.

16 December 2023 17	Celta Vigo	1–0	Granada	Vigo
14:00 CET (UTC+1)	Larsen 20', (yellow card) 22'; Vázquez (yellow card) 29'; Guaita (yellow card) 66'; Dotor (yellow card) 70'; Ristić (yellow card) 75'; Aspas (red card) 80'; Domínguez (yellow card) 84'	Report	Gumbau (yellow card) 90+3'; Diédhiou (yellow card) 90+4'	Stadium: Balaídos; Attendance: 18,027; Referee: José María Sánchez Martínez

19 December 2023 18	Granada	0–3	Sevilla	Granada
21:30 CET (UTC+1)	Gumbau (yellow card) 38'; Torrente (yellow card) 57'	Report	Pedrosa 23'; Ocampos 32'; Ramos 49'; Bueno (yellow card) 74'	Stadium: Nuevo Los Cármenes; Attendance: 16,534; Referee: Mateo Busquets Ferrer

3 January 2024 19	Granada	2–0	Cádiz	Granada
17:00 CET (UTC+1)	Uzuni 22'; Sánchez (yellow card) 64'; Boyé (yellow card) 65'; Zaragoza 70'; Miquel (yellow card) 86'	Report	Alcaraz (yellow card) 21'; Fernández (yellow card) 42'; Ramos (yellow card) 43'; Sobrino (red card) 54'; Fali (yellow card) 90+8'	Stadium: Nuevo Los Cármenes; Attendance: 17,732; Referee: Juan Luis Pulido Santana

13 January 2024 20	Real Betis	1–0	Granada	Seville
21:00 CET (UTC+1)	Papastathopoulos (yellow card) 55'; Diao (yellow card) 65'; Isco 76', (yellow card) 90+2'	Report	Méndez (yellow card) 13'; Uzuni (yellow card) 33'; Batalla (yellow card) 43'; Puertas (yellow card) 90+4'	Stadium: Benito Villamarín; Attendance: 50,197; Referee: Guillermo Cuadra Fernández

22 January 2024 21	Granada	0–1	Atlético Madrid	Granada
21:00 CET (UTC+1)	Boyé (yellow card) 75'; Batalla (yellow card) 90+5'	Report	Morata 54'; Saúl (yellow card) 72'; Savić (yellow card) 75'	Stadium: Nuevo Los Cármenes; Attendance: 18,704; Referee: Juan Martínez Munuera

29 January 2024 22	Getafe	2–0	Granada	Getafe
21:00 CET (UTC+1)	Rico (yellow card) 13'; Greenwood 21', (yellow card) 90'; Mayoral 36'	Report	Uzuni (penalty missed) 59'; Méndez (yellow card) 87'	Stadium: Coliseum; Attendance: 10,382; Referee: Víctor García Verdura

3 February 2024 23	Granada	1–1	Las Palmas	Granada
16:15 CET (UTC+1)	Batalla (yellow card) 21'; Piątkowski (red card) 21'; Méndez 43'; Arezo (yellow card) 45+1'; Villar (yellow card) 45+4'; Neva (yellow card) 45+5'	Report	Marvin (yellow card) 42'; Sandro (yellow card) 45+5'; Pejiño 68'; Escandell (red card) 71'; Loiodice (yellow card) 86'	Stadium: Nuevo Los Cármenes; Attendance: 17,941; Referee: Mateo Busquets Ferrer

11 February 2024 24	Barcelona	3–3	Granada	Barcelona
21:00 CET (UTC+1)	Yamal 14', 80'; Lewandowski 63'; Fermín (yellow card) 78'	Report	Ruiz (yellow card) 33'; Sánchez 43'; Pellistri 60'; Miquel 66', (yellow card) 78'	Stadium: Estadi Olímpic Lluís Companys; Attendance: 41,901; Referee: Miguel Ángel Ortiz Arias

18 February 2024 25	Granada	1–1	Almería	Granada
16:15 CET (UTC+1)	Villar (yellow card) 4'; Gumbau (yellow card) 68'; Uzuni 75'	Report	Pubill 9'; Robertone (yellow card) 77'; Pozo (yellow card) 90'; Radovanović (yellow card) 90+8'	Stadium: Nuevo Los Cármenes; Attendance: 18,756; Referee: Jesús Gil Manzano

3 March 2024 27	Villarreal	5–1	Granada	Villarreal
14:00 CET (UTC+1)	Sørloth 7', 19', 66'; Capoue 32', (yellow card) 84'; Guedes 47'	Report	Piątkowski (yellow card) 15'; Sánchez (yellow card) 70'; Corbeanu 90+1'	Stadium: Estadio de la Cerámica; Attendance: 15,896; Referee: Juan Luis Pulido Santana

9 March 2024 28	Granada	2–3	Real Sociedad	Granada
18:30 CET (UTC+1)	Uzuni 21', 45+3'; Ruiz (yellow card) 45+1'	Report	Traoré (yellow card) 23'; Sadiq 33', (yellow card) 63'; Le Normand 80'; Silva 85'	Stadium: Nuevo Los Cármenes; Attendance: 9,214; Referee: Juan Martínez Munuera

16 March 2024 29	Mallorca	1–0	Granada	Palma
14:00 CET (UTC+1)	Larin (yellow card) 23'; Nastasić (yellow card) 41'; Raíllo 85'	Report		Stadium: Estadi Mallorca Son Moix; Attendance: 16,477; Referee: Ricardo de Burgos Bengoetxea

29 March 2024 30	Cádiz	1–0	Granada	Cádiz
21:00 CET (UTC+1)	Navarro 51'; Chust (yellow card) 70'; Alejo (yellow card) 90+1'	Report	Sánchez (yellow card) 30'; Ruiz (yellow card) 45'; Miguel Ángel (yellow card) 70'; Corbeanu (yellow card) 72'	Stadium: Nuevo Mirandilla; Attendance: 15,422; Referee: Guillermo Cuadra Fernández

4 April 2024 26	Granada	0–1	Valencia	Granada
20:00 CEST (UTC+2)	Boyé (yellow card) 59'; Jóźwiak (yellow card) 63'; Villar (yellow card) 79'	Report	Peter (yellow card) 70'; Almeida 77'	Stadium: Nuevo Los Cármenes; Attendance: 15,107; Referee: Alejandro Hernández Hernández
Note: The match was originally scheduled for 24 February 2024, but was postponed due to the Valencia residential complex fire.

14 April 2024 31	Granada	2–0	Alavés	Granada
16:15 CEST (UTC+2)	Uzuni 9' (pen.), (yellow card) 45'; Boyé 38'; Gumbau (yellow card) 45+3'; Miguel Ángel (yellow card) 60'	Report	Gorosabel (yellow card) 20'; Tenaglia (yellow card) 45'	Stadium: Nuevo Los Cármenes; Attendance: 13,398; Referee: Víctor García Verdura

19 April 2024 32	Athletic Bilbao	1–1	Granada	Bilbao
21:00 CEST (UTC+2)	Paredes (yellow card) 4'; Guruzeta 25'; De Marcos (yellow card) 27'; Sancet (yellow card) 38'; Herrera (yellow card) 90+5'	Report	I. Williams 6' (o.g.); Puertas (yellow card) 47'; Méndez (yellow card) 66'	Stadium: San Mamés; Attendance: 45,917; Referee: Javier Iglesias Villanueva

28 April 2024 33	Granada	3–0	Osasuna	Granada
16:15 CEST (UTC+2)	Boyé (yellow card) 21', (goal) 90+4'; Jóźwiak (yellow card) 23'; Pellistri 29'; Ruiz (yellow card) 32'; Ángel (yellow card) 37'; Uzuni 48'	Report		Stadium: Nuevo Los Cármenes; Attendance: 13,825; Referee: Alejandro Muñiz Ruiz

5 May 2024 34	Sevilla	3–0	Granada	Seville
21:00 CEST (UTC+2)	Acuña 11'; En-Nesyri 51'; Ocampos (yellow card) 72'; Lukebakio 80'; Badé (yellow card) 90+3'	Report	Ruiz (yellow card) 38'; Miguel Ángel (yellow card) 53'	Stadium: Ramón Sánchez Pizjuán; Attendance: 32,668; Referee: Mateo Busquets Ferrer

11 May 2024 35	Granada	0–4	Real Madrid	Granada
18:30 CEST (UTC+2)	Boyé (yellow card) 25'; Gumbau (yellow card) 45'	Report	García 38'; Güler 45+2'; Brahim 49', 58'	Stadium: Nuevo Los Cármenes; Attendance: 20,058; Referee: Pablo González Fuertes

15 May 2024 36	Rayo Vallecano	2–1	Granada	Madrid
19:30 CEST (UTC+2)	Trejo (red card) 5'; Lejeune 23'; López (yellow card) 31'; Espino (yellow card) 57'; De Frutos 80'; Nteka (yellow card) 90+2'; Falcao (yellow card) 90+5'	Report	Corbeanu (yellow card) 42'; Callejón (yellow card) 83'; Boyé 89'; Neva (yellow card) 90'	Stadium: Campo de Fútbol de Vallecas; Attendance: 12,738; Referee: Isidro Díaz de Mera Escuderos

19 May 2024 37	Granada	1–2	Celta Vigo	Granada
19:00 CEST (UTC+2)	Méndez (yellow card) 66', (goal) 86'; Torrente (yellow card) 72'; Puertas (penalty missed) 90+7'	Report	Larsen 61'; Bamba 63'; Sotelo (yellow card) 68'	Stadium: Nuevo Los Cármenes; Attendance: 11,473; Referee: Javier Alberola Rojas

24 May 2024 38	Girona	7–0	Granada	Girona
21:00 CEST (UTC+2)	E. García 30', (yellow card) 82'; López (yellow card) 32'; Tsyhankov 33', 54'; Dovbyk 44' (pen.), 75', 90' (pen.); Portu (yellow card) 45+4'; Stuani 78'	Report	Ruiz (yellow card) 36'; Pellistri (yellow card) 39' (yellow-red card) 61'; Sánchez (yellow card) 43'; Callejón (yellow card) 62'	Stadium: Montilivi; Attendance: 12,813; Referee: Alejandro Muñiz Ruiz

=== Copa del Rey ===
2 November 2023 First round	Arosa	3–0 (awd.)	Granada	Vilagarcía de Arousa
19:00 CET (UTC+1)		Report	Callejón 19'; Villar (yellow card) 44'; Weissman 88'; Diédhiou 90'; López (yellow card) 90+2'	Stadium: A Lomba; Attendance: 3,100; Referee: Ricardo de Burgos Bengoetxea
Note: Arosa were awarded a 3–0 win after Granada fielded ineligible player Adri López during the match. Granada originally won the match 3–0.

== Statistics ==
=== Goalscorers ===
Position	Players	LaLiga	Copa del Rey	Total
FW	(Albania) Myrto Uzuni	11	0	11
FW	(Argentina) Lucas Boyé	6	0	6
DF	(Spain) Ricard Sánchez	3	0	3
DF	(Uruguay) Bruno Méndez	2	0	2
MF	(Uruguay) Facundo Pellistri	2	0	2
MF	(Canada) Theo Corbeanu	1	0	1
DF	(Spain) Ignasi Miquel	1	0	1
DF	(Spain) Miguel Rubio	1	0	1
MF	(Spain) Gonzalo Villar	1	0	1
