= 2022–23 Granada CF season =

Granada CF
2022–23 season
- President: Sophia Yang
- Head coach: Aitor Karanka (until 8 November); Paco López (from 9 November)
- Stadium: Nuevo Los Cármenes
- Segunda División: 1st (promoted)
- Copa del Rey: Second round
- Top goalscorer: League: Myrto Uzuni (23); All: Myrto Uzuni (23)
- Biggest win: Granada 5–0 Sporting Gijón
- Biggest defeat: Eibar 4–0 Granada
Home colours	Away colours

The 2022–23 season was the 92nd season in the history of Granada CF and their first season back in the second division. The club participated in the Segunda División and the Copa del Rey.

== Players ==
As of 2 February 2023.

Note: Flags indicate national team as defined under FIFA eligibility rules; some limited exceptions apply. Players may hold more than one non-FIFA nationality.

No.	Pos.	Nation	Player
1	GK	ESP	Raúl Fernández
3	MF	ESP	Pol Lozano (on loan from Espanyol)
4	DF	ESP	Miguel Rubio
5	DF	ARG	Jonathan Silva (on loan from Getafe)
6	MF	FRA	Yann Bodiger
7	MF	ESP	Alberto Soro
8	FW	SEN	Famara Diédhiou (on loan from Alanyaspor)
9	FW	ESP	José Callejón
10	FW	ESP	Antonio Puertas
11	FW	ALB	Myrto Uzuni
12	MF	ESP	Víctor Meseguer
13	GK	POR	André Ferreira
14	DF	ESP	Ignasi Miquel
15	DF	ESP	Carlos Neva

No.	Pos.	Nation	Player
16	DF	ESP	Víctor Díaz (captain)
17	DF	ESP	Quini
18	MF	SRB	Njegoš Petrović
19	FW	ESP	Jorge Molina (vice-captain)
20	MF	ESP	Sergio Ruiz
21	MF	ESP	Óscar Melendo
22	MF	ESP	Alberto Perea
23	FW	ESP	Rubén Rochina
24	DF	URU	Erick Cabaco (on loan from Getafe)
25	FW	ISR	Shon Weissman (on loan from Real Valladolid)
26	FW	ESP	Bryan Zaragoza
28	DF	ESP	Raúl Torrente
30	DF	ESP	Ricard Sánchez
33	GK	ESP	Adri López

=== Reserve team ===
Note: Flags indicate national team as defined under FIFA eligibility rules; some limited exceptions apply. Players may hold more than one non-FIFA nationality.

No.	Pos.	Nation	Player
27	MF	ESP	Mario da Costa
31	MF	ESP	Mario González
32	DF	ESP	Miki Bosch
35	MF	ESP	Martín Solar

No.	Pos.	Nation	Player
37	GK	ESP	Rafael Romero
38	GK	ESP	Ángel Jiménez
39	DF	ESP	Eu Gutiérrez

=== Other players under contract ===
Note: Flags indicate national team as defined under FIFA eligibility rules; some limited exceptions apply. Players may hold more than one non-FIFA nationality.

No.	Pos.	Nation	Player
—	DF	PER	Luis Abram

=== Out on loan ===
Note: Flags indicate national team as defined under FIFA eligibility rules; some limited exceptions apply. Players may hold more than one non-FIFA nationality.

No.	Pos.	Nation	Player
—	DF	SEN	Alpha Diounkou (on loan at Barcelona B until 30 June 2023)
—	DF	ESP	Pepe Sánchez (on loan at Deportivo La Coruña until 30 June 2023)
—	MF	ESP	Isma Ruiz (on loan at Ibiza until 30 June 2023)

No.	Pos.	Nation	Player
—	FW	ESP	Antoñín (on loan at Anorthosis until 30 June 2023)
—	FW	URU	Matías Arezo (on loan at Peñarol until 31 December 2023)
—	FW	ESP	Adrián Butzke (on loan at Paços de Ferreira until 30 June 2023)

== Transfers ==
=== In ===
Date	Player	From	Type	Fee	Ref
21 June 2022	(France) Yann Bodiger	Cartagena	Transfer	Free	
18 July 2022	(Spain) Raúl Fernández	Las Palmas	Transfer	Free	
20 July 2022	(Portugal) André Ferreira	(Portugal) Paços de Ferreira	Transfer	Undisclosed	
25 July 2022	(Spain) José Callejón	(Italy) Fiorentina	Transfer	Free	
26 July 2022	(Spain) Miguel Ángel	Getafe	Transfer	Undisclosed	
26 July 2022	(Uruguay) Erick Cabaco	Getafe	Loan		
26 July 2022	(Spain) Ignasi Miquel	Getafe	Transfer	Free	
26 July 2022	(Argentina) Jonathan Silva	Getafe	Loan		
6 August 2022	(Spain) Óscar Melendo	Espanyol	Transfer	Free	
9 August 2022	(Spain) Sergio Ruiz	(United States) Charlotte FC	Transfer	Undisclosed	
10 August 2022	(Spain) Víctor Meseguer	Mirandés	Transfer	Undisclosed	
1 September 2022	(Spain) Alberto Perea	Cádiz	Transfer	Free	

=== Out ===
Date	Player	To	Type	Fee	Ref
6 June 2022	(Spain) Monchu	Real Valladolid	Transfer	Undisclosed	
1 July 2022	(France) Maxime Gonalons	(France) Clermont Foot	Transfer	Free	
1 July 2022	(Spain) Dani Raba	Leganés	Transfer	Free	
1 July 2022	(Spain) Germán Sánchez	Released			
1 July 2022	(Venezuela) Darwin Machís	(Mexico) Juárez	Transfer	Free	
2 July 2022	(Spain) Aarón Escandell	Cartagena	Transfer	Free	
11 July 2022	(Portugal) Domingos Duarte	Getafe	Transfer	Undisclosed	
13 July 2022	(Spain) Sergio Escudero	Real Valladolid	Transfer	Free	
13 July 2022	(Portugal) Luís Maximiano	(Italy) Lazio	Transfer	Undisclosed	
19 July 2022	(Cameroon) Yan Eteki	(Portugal) Casa Pia	Transfer	Undisclosed	
20 July 2022	(Colombia) Luis Suárez	(France) Marseille	Transfer	Undisclosed	
22 July 2022	(Colombia) Neyder Lozano	Lugo	Transfer	Free	
25 July 2022	(Spain) Antoñín	(Portugal) Vitória de Guimarães	Loan		
25 July 2022	(Spain) Luis Milla	Getafe	Transfer	Undisclosed	
14 August 2022	(Spain) Adrián Marín	(Portugal) Gil Vicente	Transfer	Undisclosed	
19 August 2022	(Spain) Isma Ruiz	Ibiza	Loan		
24 August 2022	(Spain) Adrián Butzke	(Portugal) Paços de Ferreira	Loan		

== Pre-season and friendlies ==
Win Draw Loss Fixtures

20 July 2022 Friendly	Córdoba	1–0	Granada	Córdoba
20:30 CEST (UTC+2)				Stadium: Estadio Nuevo Arcángel

23 July 2022 Friendly	Granada	5–0	Linares Deportivo	Granada
CEST (UTC+2)	Da Costa 9'; Puertas 36'; Zaragoza 67'; Butzke 73'; Molina 83'			Stadium: Ciudad Deportiva del Granada CF

27 July 2022 Friendly	Xerez Deportivo	0–2	Granada	Jerez
20:00 CEST (UTC+2)				Stadium: Chapín

27 July 2022 Friendly	Granada	1–0	Real Madrid Castilla	Jerez
21:00 CEST (UTC+2)	Uzuni 10'			Stadium: Chapín

30 July 2022 Friendly	Granada	3–2	Almería	Jerez
19:00 CEST (UTC+2)				Stadium: Campo Hotel Barceló Montecastillo

6 August 2022 Trofeo Ciudad de Granada	Granada	1–1 (2–3 p)	Málaga	Granada
CEST (UTC+2)				Stadium: Nuevo Los Cármenes

== Competitions ==
=== Overall record ===
Competition	First match	Last match	Starting round	Final position	Record							
Competition	First match	Last match	Starting round	Final position	Pld	W	D	L	GF	GA	GD	Win %
Segunda División	14 August 2022	27 May 2023	Matchday 1	Winners	42	22	9	11	55	30	+25	52.38
Copa del Rey	13 November 2022	22 December 2022	First round	Second round	2	1	0	1	3	3	+0	50.00
Total					44	23	9	12	58	33	+25	52.27

Source: Soccerway

=== Segunda División ===
==== League table ====
Pos	Team	Pld	W	D	L	GF	GA	GD	Pts	Qualification or relegation
1	Granada (C, P)	42	22	9	11	55	30	+25	75	Promotion to La Liga
2	Las Palmas (P)	42	18	18	6	49	29	+20	72 (Note: Overall goal difference: Las Palmas +20, Levante +16.)	Promotion to La Liga
3	Levante	42	18	18	6	46	30	+16	72	Qualification for promotion play-offs
4	Alavés (O, P)	42	19	14	9	47	33	+14	71 (Note: Alavés finished ahead of Eibar on head-to-head points: Eibar 0–0 Alavés, Alavés 2–0 Eibar.)	Qualification for promotion play-offs
5	Eibar	42	19	14	9	45	36	+9	71	Qualification for promotion play-offs

Source: LaLiga SmartBank
Rules for classification: 1) points; 2) head-to-head points; 3) head-to-head goal difference; 4) goal difference; 5) number of goals scored
(C) Champions; (O) Play-off winners; (P) Promoted
Notes:

Notes

1. Reserve teams are not eligible for promotion to the same league as the first team.

==== Results summary ====
Overall								Home						Away					
Pld	W	D	L	GF	GA	GD	Pts	W	D	L	GF	GA	GD	W	D	L	GF	GA	GD
42	22	9	11	55	30	+25	75	17	4	0	39	6	+33	5	5	11	16	24	−8

Source: LaLiga SmartBank

==== Results by round ====
Round	1	2	3	4	5	6	7	8	9	10	11	12	13	14	15	16	17	18	19	20	21	22	23	24	25	26	27	28	29	30	31	32	33	34	35	36	37	38	39	40	41	42
Ground	A	H	H	A	A	H	A	H	A	H	A	H	A	H	A	H	A	H	A	H	A	H	A	H	H	A	H	A	H	A	H	A	H	A	A	H	A	H	A	H	A	H
Result	W	W	W	L	L	W	L	D	D	W	L	W	D	D	L	W	L	W	D	W	L	W	L	W	W	W	W	D	W	W	D	W	W	L	L	W	L	D	D	W	W	W
Position	1	1	1	2	6	3	5	7	9	5	8	4	6	7	8	6	8	7	7	6	6	5	7	7	6	5	4	5	5	4	4	2	2	3	3	2	3	2	3	1	1	1

Source: LaLiga SmartBank
A = Away; H = Home; W = Win; D = Draw; L = Loss

==== Matches ====
The league fixtures were announced on 23 June 2022.

14 August 2022 1	Ibiza	0–2	Granada	Ibiza
CEST (UTC+2)

20 August 2022 2	Granada	2–0	Racing Santander	Granada
CEST (UTC+2)				Stadium: Nuevo Los Cármenes

29 August 2022 3	Granada	3–0	Villarreal B	Granada
CEST (UTC+2)				Stadium: Nuevo Los Cármenes

4 September 2022 4	Andorra	1–0	Granada	Andorra
CEST (UTC+2)

12 September 2022 5	Eibar	4–0	Granada	Eibar
CEST (UTC+2)

17 September 2022 6	Granada	2–1	Mirandés	Granada
CEST (UTC+2)				Stadium: Nuevo Los Cármenes

26 September 2022 7	Las Palmas	2–0	Granada	Las Palmas
CEST (UTC+2)

2 October 2022 8	Granada	0–0	Huesca	Granada
CEST (UTC+2)				Stadium: Nuevo Los Cármenes

8 October 2022 9	Ponferradina	0–0	Granada	Ponferrada
CEST (UTC+2)

13 October 2022 10	Granada	5–0	Sporting Gijón	Granada
CEST (UTC+2)				Stadium: Nuevo Los Cármenes

16 October 2022 11	Tenerife	2–0	Granada	Santa Cruz de Tenerife
CEST (UTC+2)

21 October 2022 12	Granada	1–0	Zaragoza	Granada
CEST (UTC+2)				Stadium: Nuevo Los Cármenes

30 October 2022 13	Cartagena	0–0	Granada	Cartagena
CEST (UTC+2)

3 November 2022 14	Granada	0–0	Levante	Granada
CET (UTC+1)				Stadium: Nuevo Los Cármenes

6 November 2022 15	Oviedo	1–0	Granada	Oviedo
CET (UTC+1)

18 November 2022 16	Granada	4–0	Albacete	Granada
CET (UTC+1)				Stadium: Nuevo Los Cármenes

27 November 2022 17	Leganés	1–0	Granada	Leganés
CET (UTC+1)

2 December 2022 19	Granada	3–1	Alavés	Granada
CET (UTC+1)				Stadium: Nuevo Los Cármenes

8 December 2022 20	Málaga	1–1	Granada	Málaga
CET (UTC+1)

11 December 2022 21	Granada	1–0	Burgos	Granada
CET (UTC+1)				Stadium: Nuevo Los Cármenes

17 December 2022 21	Lugo	1–0	Granada	Lugo
CET (UTC+1)

8 January 2023 22	Granada	1–0	Cartagena	Granada
CET (UTC+1)				Stadium: Nuevo Los Cármenes

14 January 2023 23	Levante	3–1	Granada	Valencia
CET (UTC+1)

21 January 2023 24	Granada	2–0	Ibiza	Granada
CET (UTC+1)				Stadium: Nuevo Los Cármenes

28 January 2023 25	Granada	2–0	Andorra	Granada
CET (UTC+1)				Stadium: Nuevo Los Cármenes

5 February 2023 26	Villarreal B	0–2	Granada	Villarreal
CET (UTC+1)

10 February 2023 27	Granada	2–0	Tenerife	Granada
CET (UTC+1)				Stadium: Nuevo Los Cármenes

19 February 2023 28	Huesca	1–1	Granada	Huesca
CET (UTC+1)

27 February 2023 29	Granada	1–0	Málaga	Granada
CET (UTC+1)				Stadium: Nuevo Los Cármenes

4 March 2023 30	Burgos	1–3	Granada	Burgos
CET (UTC+1)

12 March 2023 31	Granada	2–2	Ponferradina	Granada
CET (UTC+1)				Stadium: Nuevo Los Cármenes

18 March 2023 32	Albacete	1–2	Granada	Albacete
CET (UTC+1)

26 March 2023 33	Granada	1–0	Oviedo	Granada
CET (UTC+1)				Stadium: Nuevo Los Cármenes

2 April 2023 34	Sporting Gijón	1–0	Granada	Gijón
CEST (UTC+2)

8 April 2023 35	Zaragoza	1–0	Granada	Zaragoza
CEST (UTC+2)

15 April 2023 36	Granada	2–1	Las Palmas	Granada
CEST (UTC+2)				Stadium: Nuevo Los Cármenes

23 April 2023 37	Racing Santander	1–0	Granada	Santander
CEST (UTC+2)

30 April 2023 38	Granada	1–1	Eibar	Granada
CEST (UTC+2)				Stadium: Nuevo Los Cármenes

5 May 2023 39	Alavés	1–1	Granada	Vitoria-Gasteiz
CEST (UTC+2)

13 May 2023 40	Granada	2–0	Lugo	Granada
18:30 CEST (UTC+2)	Puertas 17'; Zaragoza 21'			Stadium: Nuevo Los Cármenes

20 May 2023 41	Mirandés	1–3	Granada	Miranda de Ebro
18:30 CEST (UTC+2)	Sanz (red card) 24'; López 57'		Puertas 30', 62'; Zaragoza 78'	Stadium: Estadio Municipal de Anduva

27 May 2023 42	Granada	2–0	Leganés	Granada
21:00 CEST (UTC+2)	Uzuni 42'; Zaragoza 58'			Stadium: Nuevo Los Cármenes

=== Copa del Rey ===
13 November 2022 First round	Yeclano	2–3	Granada	Yecla
17:00	Clemente 78'; Revilla 90+3'	Report	Miquel 20'; R. Sánchez 41'; Molina 65'	Stadium: La Constitución; Referee: Víctor García Verdura

22 December 2022 Second round	Oviedo	1–0	Granada	Oviedo
21:00	Luengo 8'	Report		Stadium: Carlos Tartiere; Referee: Francisco José Hernández Maeso
