= Alexandre Rita =

Angolan footballer

Personal information
- Full name: Alexandre Miguel Candeias Rita
- Date of birth: 6 April 1995 (age 31)
- Place of birth: Luanda, Angola
- Height: 1.82 m (6 ft 0 in)
- Positions: Midfielder; defender

Team information
- Current team: Barreirense
- Number: 21

Youth career
- 2009–2013: ADCEO
- 2013–2014: Oriental

Senior career*
Years	Team	Apps	(Gls)
2014–2015	Oriental	3	(0)
2015	Operário	0	(0)
2016	Oeiras	7	(3)
2016–	Barreirense	14	(0)
- * Club domestic league appearances and goals as of 5 March 2017

Alexandre Miguel Candeias Rita (born 6 April 1995) is an Angolan footballer who plays for Barreirense as a midfielder.

== Career ==
On 16 November 2014, Rita made his professional debut with Oriental in a 2014–15 Taça da Liga match against Boavista.
