= Gerard Gumbau =

Spanish footballer (born 1994)

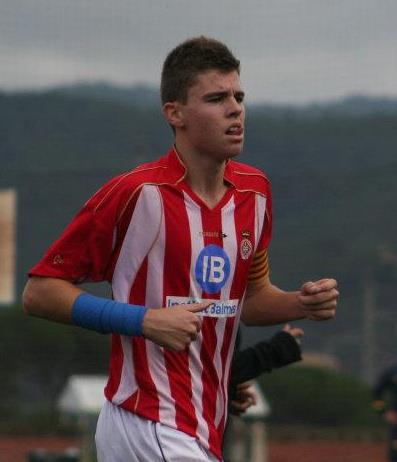
- Gumbau with Girona B in 2013

Personal information
- Full name: Gerard Gumbau Garriga
- Date of birth: 18 December 1994 (age 31)
- Place of birth: Campllong, Spain
- Height: 1.87 m (6 ft 2 in)
- Position: Defensive midfielder

Team information
- Current team: Granada

Youth career
- 2003–2007: Cassà
- 2007–2013: Girona

Senior career*
Years	Team	Apps	(Gls)
2013–2014	Girona B	32	(7)
2014–2017	Barcelona B	90	(14)
2015–2016	Barcelona	3	(0)
2017–2019	Leganés	41	(2)
2019–2021	Girona	78	(2)
2021–2023	Elche	66	(1)
2023–	Granada	35	(0)
2024–2026	→ Rayo Vallecano (loan)	50	(0)

International career
2022–	Catalonia	2	(0)
- * Club domestic league appearances and goals as of 25 May 2026

Gerard Gumbau Garriga (born 18 December 1994) is a Spanish professional footballer who plays as a defensive or central midfielder for Granada.

== Club career ==
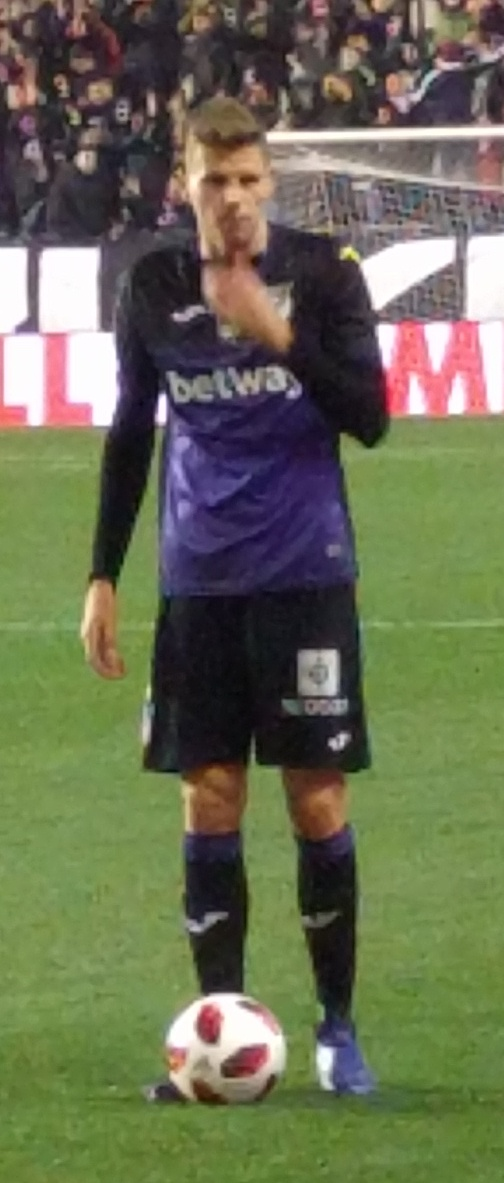
Gumbau with Leganés in 2018.

Born in Campllong, Girona, Catalonia, Gumbau graduated from Girona's youth setup, and made his senior debuts with the reserves in the 2012–13 campaign, in Segona Catalana. He played a key part in the following season, in Primera Catalana, appearing in 31 matches and scoring six times, whilst being named on the bench with the first team in some occasions.

On 1 July 2014, Gumbau signed a three-year deal with Barcelona, being assigned to the B-team in the Segunda División. On 23 August, he played his first match as a professional, replacing Wilfrid Kaptoum in the 76th minute of a 0–2 away loss against Osasuna. Gumbau scored his first professional goal on 7 September, netting his side's third in a 4–1 home routing of Zaragoza; three weeks later, he was sent off in a 3–3 draw with Mallorca.

On 15 January 2015, Gumbau made his debut with the main squad, starting in a 4–0 Copa del Rey away win against Elche (9–0 on aggregate). He made his La Liga debut on 20 September 2015, coming on as a second-half substitute for Sergio Busquets in a 4–1 home routing of Levante. On 4 June 2017, he scored the winner for the B-side in a 2–1 away win against Cartagena, which proved to be decisive as his side advanced to the play-offs through the away goals rule.

On 12 July 2017, Gumbau signed a three-year contract with Leganés in the first division. He scored his first goal in the category the following 15 January, but in a 2–3 loss to Real Betis.

On 14 August 2019, Gumbau returned to his first club Girona, signing a three-year contract and being assigned to the main squad in the second level. He terminated his contract on 31 August 2021, and signed a two-year contract with Elche hours later.

On 27 July 2023, recently-promoted to La Liga side Granada announced the free signing of Gumbau, after his link with Elche had expired. On 15 July of the following year, after suffering relegation, he activated a clause on his contract which allowed him to leave the club on loan to a top tier side, and agreed to a one-year deal with Rayo Vallecano.

On 16 July 2025, Gumbau agreed to a new one-year loan deal with Rayo.

== Club statistics ==
As of match played 23 May 2026

Appearances and goals by club, season and competition
Club	Season	League			Copa del Rey		Europe		Other		Total	
Club	Season	Division	Apps	Goals	Apps	Goals	Apps	Goals	Apps	Goals	Apps	Goals
Girona B	2012–13	Segona Catalana	1	1	—		—		—		1	1
Girona B	2013–14	Primera Catalana	31	6	—		—		—		31	6
Girona B	Total		32	7	—		—		—		32	7
Barcelona B	2014–15	Segunda División	38	3	—		—		—		38	3
Barcelona B	2015–16	Segunda División	24	3	—		—		—		24	3
Barcelona B	2016–17	Segunda División	28	8	—		—		6 (Note: Appearances in Segunda División B play-offs)	1	34	9
Barcelona B	Total		90	14	—		—		6	1	96	15
Barcelona	2014–15	La Liga	0	0	1	0	0	0	—		1	0
Barcelona	2015–16	La Liga	3	0	2	0	3 (Note: Appearances in UEFA Champions League)	0	—		8	0
Barcelona	Total		3	0	3	0	3	0	—		9	0
Leganés	2017–18	La Liga	25	1	6	0	—		—		31	1
Leganés	2018–19	La Liga	16	1	4	0	—		—		20	1
Leganés	Total		41	2	10	0	—		—		51	2
Girona	2019–20	Segunda División	38	1	3	0	—		3 (Note: Appearances in Segunda División play-offs)	0	44	1
Girona	2020–21	Segunda División	38	1	1	0	—		4	0	43	1
Girona	2021–22	Segunda División	2	0	0	0	—		—		2	0
Girona	Total		78	2	4	0	—		7	0	89	2
Elche	2021–22	La Liga	31	0	4	0	—		—		35	0
Elche	2022–23	La Liga	35	1	3	0	—		—		38	1
Elche	Total		66	1	7	0	—		—		73	1
Granada	2023–24	La Liga	35	0	1	0	—		—		36	0
Rayo Vallecano	2024–25	La Liga	22	0	3	0	—		—		25	0
Rayo Vallecano	2025–26	La Liga	28	0	4	1	11 (Note: Appearances in UEFA Conference League)	1	—		43	2
Rayo Vallecano	Total		50	0	7	1	11	1	—		68	2
Career total			395	26	32	1	14	1	13	1	454	29

== Honours ==
Barcelona

- La Liga: 2015–16
- Copa del Rey: 2014–15, 2015–16
- FIFA Club World Cup: 2015

Rayo Vallecano

- UEFA Conference League runner-up: 2025–26

Individual

- La Liga Play of the Month: October 2023 (with Bryan Zaragoza)
