= Tiago Rosa =

Portuguese footballer (born 1986)

Personal information
- Full name: Tiago Miguel Luís Rosa
- Date of birth: 6 March 1986 (age 40)
- Place of birth: Lisbon, Portugal
- Height: 1.84 m (6 ft 0 in)
- Position: Defender

Youth career
- 1995–2005: Estrela Amadora

Senior career*
Years	Team	Apps	(Gls)
2005–2006	Estrela Amadora	1	(0)
2006–2007	Casa Pia		
2007–2008	Tourizense	3	(0)
2008–2009	Atlético CP	19	(1)
2009–2010	Oriental	39	(0)
2010–2011	Naval	2	(0)
2012–2013	União	28	(0)
2013–2014	Académico Viseu	19	(0)
2014–2015	Oriental	29	(0)
2015–2016	Penafiel	4	(0)
2016–2017	Fátima	21	(0)
- * Club domestic league appearances and goals

Tiago Miguel Luís Rosa (born 6 March 1986) is a Portuguese professional footballer who plays as a defender.
