= Bryan Zaragoza =

Spanish footballer (born 2001)

Personal information
- Full name: Bryan Zaragoza Martínez
- Date of birth: 9 September 2001 (age 25)
- Place of birth: Málaga, Spain
- Height: 1.64 m (5 ft 5 in)
- Positions: Winger; attacking midfielder

Team information
- Current team: Espanyol (on loan from Bayern Munich)
- Number: 15

Youth career
- Tiro Pichón
- Conejito Málaga
- 2019–2020: Granada

Senior career*
Years	Team	Apps	(Gls)
2020–2022	Granada B	33	(7)
2020–2021	→ El Ejido (loan)	15	(1)
2021–2024	Granada	55	(11)
2024	→ Bayern Munich (loan)	7	(0)
2024–	Bayern Munich	0	(0)
2024–2025	→ Osasuna (loan)	27	(1)
2025–2026	→ Celta (loan)	19	(1)
2026	→ Roma (loan)	4	(0)
2026–	→ Espanyol (loan)	8	(1)

International career^{‡}
2023–	Spain	3	(1)
- * Club domestic league appearances and goals as of 23:45, 30 October 2026 (UTC) ‡ National team caps and goals as of 21:47, 15 October 2024 (UTC)

Bryan Zaragoza Martínez (born 9 September 2001) is a Spanish professional footballer who plays as a winger and attacking midfielder for La Liga club Espanyol, on loan from Bundesliga club Bayern Munich. He also plays for the Spain national team.

== Club career ==
=== Granada ===
Born in Málaga, Andalusia, Zaragoza joined Granada's youth setup in 2019, from hometown side CD Conejito de Málaga. On 29 May 2020, after finishing his formation, he renewed his contract until 2022, and was loaned to Segunda División B side El Ejido on 23 September.

Upon returning in July 2021, Zaragoza was assigned to the reserves in Segunda División RFEF. He made his first-team debut on 30 November, coming on as a half-time substitute in a 7–0 away routing of Laguna in the season's Copa del Rey.

On 14 January 2022, Zaragoza renewed his contract until 2024. He made his professional debut on 12 September, replacing Myrto Uzuni in a 4–0 Segunda División away loss against Eibar.

Zaragoza scored his first professional goal on 18 November 2022, netting his team's third in a 4–0 home routing of Albacete. On 29 May of the following year, after helping the Nazaríes in their promotion to La Liga as champions, he further extended his link until 2027, being definitely promoted to the main squad.

Zaragoza made his debut in the top tier of Spanish football on 14 August 2023, playing the last 9 minutes in a 3–1 away loss to Atlético Madrid. He scored his first goal in the category twelve days later, netting Granada's second in a 3–2 home win over Mallorca.

On 8 October 2023, Zaragoza scored a brace in a 2–2 home draw against Barcelona, equaling the number of goals scored in the previous campaign (5) in just nine matches. During the first half of the 2023–24 campaign, he managed to be one of the top ten for most successful dribbles in the top European competitions.

=== Bayern Munich ===
On 6 December 2023, German Bundesliga club Bayern Munich signed Zaragoza. He was chosen to wear the number 17. Zaragoza initially was set to join them the following summer at the start of the 2024–25 season, also he was set to sign a contract until 30 June 2029. The transfer fee paid by the Germans was reported to be €15,000,000. However, the player joined the club earlier, on 1 February 2024, to replace the injured Kingsley Coman, on a loan deal, for which Bayern paid around €4,000,000 as compensation to Granada. Zaragoza made his debut in a 3–2 defeat against VfL Bochum on February 19, 2024, as a substitute in the 70th minute to replace Joshua Kimmich.

==== Loan to Osasuna ====
On 9 August 2024, Zaragoza went on loan to La Liga club Osasuna for the 2024–25 season without an option to purchase in a deal worth €250,000. He scored his first goal in a 4–2 win against Barcelona on 28 September that same year.

==== Loan to Celta ====
On 30 July 2025, Zaragoza returned to Spain and joined La Liga club Celta on a season long loan for €1 million, with the obligation to make the move permanent at the end of the 2025–26 season under certain conditions.

==== Loan to Roma ====
On 2 February 2026, he moved to Italy and joined Serie A side Roma on a six-month loan until the end of the season, with an option to make the move permanent. Zaragoza made his debut for the club on 9 February 2026, as a substitute against Cagliari. He made his first goal involvement for Roma in the form of an assist to Donyell Malen against Napoli, six days later on 15 February 2026.

==== Loan to Espanyol ====
On 27 August 2026, Zaragoza returned to Spain and joined La Liga club Espanyol on loan for the 2026–27 season, with a buy option.

== International career ==
On 8 October 2023, Zaragoza was called up to the Spain national team by manager Luis de la Fuente for two UEFA Euro 2024 qualifying Group A matches against Scotland and Norway; he became the first Granada player to be called up since Ángel Castellanos in 1974. He made his full international debut four days later, replacing Mikel Oyarzabal at half-time in a 2–0 win over Scotland.

== Career statistics ==
=== Club ===
As of match played 19 March 2026

Appearances and goals by club, season and competition
Club	Season	League			National cup (Note: Includes Copa del Rey)		Europe		Total	
Club	Season	Division	Apps	Goals	Apps	Goals	Apps	Goals	Apps	Goals
El Ejido (loan)	2020–21	Segunda División B	15	1	0	0	—		15	1
Granada B	2021–22	Segunda División RFEF	33	7	—		—		33	7
Granada	2021–22	La Liga	0	0	1	0	—		1	0
Granada	2022–23	Segunda División	34	5	2	0	—		36	5
Granada	2023–24	La Liga	21	6	0	0	—		21	6
Granada	Total		55	11	3	0	0	0	58	11
Bayern Munich (loan)	2023–24	Bundesliga	7	0	—		0	0	7	0
Osasuna (loan)	2024–25	La Liga	27	1	1	0	—		28	1
Celta (loan)	2025–26	La Liga	19	1	0	0	7 (Note: Appearances in UEFA Europa League)	1	26	2
Roma (loan)	2025–26	Serie A	4	0	—		2	0	6	0
Career total			160	21	4	0	9	1	173	22

=== International ===
As of match played 18 November 2024

Appearances and goals by national team and year
National team	Year	Apps	Goals
Spain	2023	1	0
Spain	2024	2	1
Total		3	1

As of match played 18 November 2024
Scores and results list Spain's goal tally first, score column indicates score after each Bryan Zaragoza goal

List of international goals scored by Bryan Zaragoza
No.	Date	Venue	Cap	Opponent	Score	Result	Competition
1	18 November 2024	Estadio Heliodoro Rodríguez López, Santa Cruz de Tenerife, Spain	3	Switzerland	3–2	3–2	2024–25 UEFA Nations League A

== Honours ==
Granada

- Segunda División: 2022–23

Individual

- La Liga U23 Player of the Month: October 2023
- La Liga Play of the Month: October 2023 (with Gerard Gumbau)
