= Raúl Fernández (footballer, born 1988) =

Spanish footballer

Personal information
- Full name: Raúl Fernández-Cavada Mateos
- Date of birth: 13 March 1988 (age 38)
- Place of birth: Bilbao, Spain
- Height: 1.95 m (6 ft 5 in)
- Position: Goalkeeper

Team information
- Current team: Leganés
- Number: 1

Youth career
- 1997–1998: Colegio Francés
- 1998–2006: Athletic Bilbao

Senior career*
Years	Team	Apps	(Gls)
2006–2007	Basconia	29	(0)
2007–2010	Bilbao Athletic	19	(0)
2008–2009	→ Conquense (loan)	24	(0)
2009–2010	→ Granada (loan)	22	(0)
2010–2014	Athletic Bilbao	5	(0)
2013–2014	→ Numancia (loan)	11	(0)
2014–2015	Racing Santander	4	(0)
2015	Valladolid	1	(0)
2015–2016	Mirandés	41	(0)
2016–2018	Levante	44	(0)
2018–2022	Las Palmas	60	(0)
2022–2024	Granada	35	(0)
2024–2025	Mirandés	42	(0)
2025–2026	Alavés	0	(0)
2026–	Leganés	3	(0)
- * Club domestic league appearances and goals as of 23:16, 29 October 2026 (UTC)

Raúl Fernández-Cavada Mateos (born 13 March 1988) is a Spanish professional footballer who plays as a goalkeeper for Segunda División club Leganés.

== Club career ==
Born in Bilbao, Biscay, Fernández joined Athletic Bilbao's prolific youth system, Lezama, at the age of 10. He made his senior debut with the reserve side in the Segunda División B, then went on to spend two seasons on loan in the same tier, first with UB Conquense then Granada CF; with the latter club, he was the most utilised player in his position in a return to Segunda División after an absence of more than two decades.

Fernández was definitely promoted to Athletic's first team for 2010–11, following the retirement of veteran Armando. On 23 April 2011, as longtime starter Gorka Iraizoz was suspended following his fifth booking of the campaign, he made his La Liga debut, performing well in a 2–1 home win against Basque neighbours Real Sociedad.

On 10 July 2013, Fernández was loaned to CD Numancia from the second division. On 18 July of the following year, he moved to Racing de Santander of the same league on a one-year deal.

Fernández terminated his contract with the Cantabrians on 22 January 2015, and moved to Real Valladolid hours later. On 30 June, after acting as a backup to Javi Varas, he signed for CD Mirandés also in the second tier.

Having appeared in 49 competitive games in his only season, the free agent Fernández joined fellow second-division Levante UD in July 2016. On 23 July 2018, he signed for UD Las Palmas on a three-year contract.

In April 2019, Fernández suffered an injury during a match against Cádiz CF. Initially expected to miss the remainder of the campaign due to a hand and a left-knee injury, he spent the entire 2019–20 sidelined as well. After relapsing in his recovery, he was subject to layoff by his club, which left him unregistered until January 2021; this decision was later revoked.

On 18 July 2022, Fernández went back to Granada on a two-year deal. First-choice as they achieved promotion to the top flight, his successive physical problems saw him lose his starting position to André Ferreira first and later Augusto Batalla, and he left in May 2024.

Fernández returned to Mirandés on 13 July 2024, on a one-year contract. One year later, the 37-year-old moved to the main division with Deportivo Alavés on a deal of the same duration; barred by Antonio Sivera, he only made appearances in the Copa del Rey.

On 7 July 2026, Fernández signed a one-year deal with CD Leganés.

== Career statistics ==
As of match played 4 February 2026

Appearances and goals by club, season and competition
Club	Season	League			National cup		Europe		Other		Total	
Club	Season	Division	Apps	Goals	Apps	Goals	Apps	Goals	Apps	Goals	Apps	Goals
Basconia	2006–07	Tercera División	29	0	—		—		—		29	0
Bilbao Athletic	2007–08	Segunda División B	19	0	—		—		—		19	0
Conquense (loan)	2008–09	Segunda División B	24	0	2	0	—		—		26	0
Granada (loan)	2009–10	Segunda División B	22	0	—		—		0	0	22	0
Athletic Bilbao	2007–08	La Liga	0	0	0	0	—		—		0	0
Athletic Bilbao	2010–11	La Liga	1	0	0	0	—		—		1	0
Athletic Bilbao	2011–12	La Liga	1	0	0	0	1	0	—		2	0
Athletic Bilbao	2012–13	La Liga	3	0	2	0	3	0	—		8	0
Athletic Bilbao	Total		5	0	2	0	4	0	—		11	0
Numancia (loan)	2013–14	Segunda División	11	0	1	0	—		—		12	0
Racing Santander	2014–15	Segunda División	4	0	—		—		—		4	0
Valladolid	2014–15	Segunda División	1	0	—		—		0	0	1	0
Mirandés	2015–16	Segunda División	41	0	9	0	—		—		50	0
Levante	2016–17	Segunda División	33	0	1	0	—		—		34	0
Levante	2017–18	La Liga	11	0	2	0	—		—		13	0
Levante	Total		44	0	3	0	—		—		47	0
Las Palmas	2018–19	Segunda División	32	0	0	0	—		—		32	0
Las Palmas	2021–22	Segunda División	28	0	0	0	—		0	0	28	0
Las Palmas	Total		60	0	0	0	—		0	0	60	0
Granada	2022–23	Segunda División	31	0	0	0	—		—		31	0
Granada	2023–24	La Liga	4	0	0	0	—		—		4	0
Granada	Total		35	0	0	0	—		—		35	0
Mirandés	2024–25	Segunda División	42	0	0	0	—		4	0	46	0
Alavés	2025–26	La Liga	0	0	5	0	—		—		5	0
Career total			337	0	22	0	4	0	4	0	367	0

== Honours ==
Granada

- Segunda División: 2022–23
- Segunda División B: 2009–10

Levante

- Segunda División: 2016–17

Individual

- Ricardo Zamora Trophy (Segunda División): 2016–17, 2022–23
