= Ignasi Miquel =

Spanish footballer (born 1992)

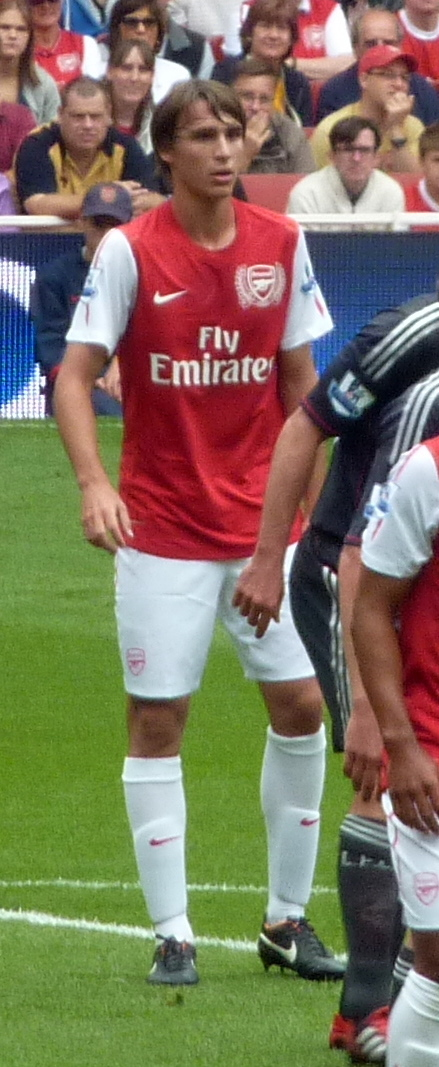
- Miquel playing for Arsenal in 2011

Personal information
- Full name: Ignasi Miquel Pons
- Date of birth: 28 September 1992 (age 34)
- Place of birth: Barcelona, Spain
- Height: 1.88 m (6 ft 2 in)
- Position: Defender

Team information
- Current team: Leganés
- Number: 5

Youth career
- 1999–2004: Barcelona
- 2004–2008: Cornellà
- 2008–2010: Arsenal

Senior career*
Years	Team	Apps	(Gls)
2010–2014	Arsenal	5	(0)
2013–2014	→ Leicester City (loan)	7	(0)
2014–2015	Norwich City	0	(0)
2015–2016	Ponferradina	25	(0)
2016–2017	Lugo	49	(3)
2017–2018	Málaga	20	(0)
2018–2022	Getafe	7	(0)
2019–2020	→ Girona (loan)	18	(0)
2020–2021	→ Leganés (loan)	21	(0)
2021–2022	→ Huesca (loan)	34	(4)
2022–2025	Granada	74	(1)
2025	Levante	9	(0)
2025–	Leganés	38	(0)

International career
2011	Spain U19	9	(1)
2013	Spain U21	1	(0)
- * Club domestic league appearances and goals as of 19 November 2026

Ignasi Miquel Pons (born 28 September 1992) is a Spanish professional footballer who plays for CD Leganés. Mainly a centre-back, he can also be utilized at left-back.

Miquel is a Spanish youth international and has played for the under-21 team, under-19 team and under-16 team.

== Club career ==
=== Early career ===
Born in Barcelona, Catalonia, Miquel spent five years at La Masia academy before being released. Miquel transferred to UE Cornellà but it was not long before Miquel was playing for the club's reserve team, leading to a call-up to the Spain under-16's. A series of outstanding performances for the Spanish Youth side caught the eye of some of the world's biggest clubs. Manchester United and Valencia CF both faxed trial offers, showing how his stock had risen in just a few months.

=== Arsenal ===
Miquel joined the club just after his 16th birthday, making his debut in the Zinedine Zidane Tournament held in Cannes. Miquel made 12 appearances for the reserves in the 2009–10 season, becoming reserve team captain. He was selected as part of the first team squad for Cup games against Ipswich Town and Leeds United in January 2011 but did not feature in either game.

On 20 February 2011, prior to Arsenal's FA Cup fifth-round match against Leyton Orient, it was announced that he would be starting his first competitive match for the club. He played the full 90 minutes as Arsenal drew with Leyton Orient 1–1. On 2 March, Miquel played the full 90 minutes as Arsenal beat Leyton Orient 5–0 in the FA Cup replay at the Emirates. He only made two appearances later in the 2010–11 season.

At the start of the 2011–12 season, Miquel enjoyed a season to remember in the first team after being called into action in both the Premier League and Champions League. Miquel made his Premier League debut against Liverpool on 20 August 2011, coming on for the injured Laurent Koscielny in the 16th minute as Arsenal lost 2–0. Liverpool's first goal occurred when Miquel's clearance hit Aaron Ramsey's chest, resulting in an own goal. Miquel made his second appearance of the season and his debut in the Football League Cup in the 3–1 win against Shrewsbury Town. Miquel would go on to play every minute of Arsenal's 2011–12 League Cup campaign as they reached the fifth round before being knocked out by Manchester City. On 6 December 2011, Miquel made his UEFA Champions League debut for Arsenal in the 3–1 away defeat to Olympiacos, coming on for André Santos in the 51st minute. On 9 January 2012, Miquel made his first FA Cup appearance of the season, starting at left-back as Arsenal beat Leeds United 1–0 in the third round. On 15 January 2012, Miquel made his first Premier League start in the 3–2 defeat to Swansea City, playing the full 90 minutes at left-back. At the end of the 2011–12 season, he made nine appearances in all competitions.

In the 2012–13 season, Miquel made his first start of the season and scored his first career goal in the 6–1 victory over Coventry City in the League Cup. Miquel headed home an Andrei Arshavin cross from close range. His second appearance then came on 30 October 2012, where he started and played 105 minutes before substituted at extra–time, in a 7–5 win over Reading in the Last 16 of the League Cup. Miquel made his first Premier League appearance of the season in the 1–0 away victory over Sunderland, replacing Theo Walcott as a substitute in the 88th minute. After this, Miquel returned to the development squad for the rest of the season and captained the side in number of occasions. At the end of the 2012–13 season, he went on to make a total of 3 appearances.

==== Loan to Leicester City ====
On 9 August 2013, Miquel joined Championship side Leicester City on loan until the end of the 2013–14 season.

Miquel made his debut for The Foxes on 27 August 2013 in the 5–2 away win over Carlisle United in the second-round of the League Cup. Miquel scored his first goal for the club against Fulham on 30 October 2013, in the League Cup, helping his side progress into the quarter-finals (with a 4–3 win). After the match, Miquel spoke out about the match, saying: "It's an unbelievable feeling. After we scored the third goal I think we just switched off and got punished, but I think in the end the important thing was that we got the result." However, Miquel struggled to regain his first team place at Leicester City, due to Wes Morgan and Liam Moore preferred in the central–backs. Despite being absent for most of the season, he helped the side reach the promotion to the Premier League, making 12 appearances and scoring once for the side in all competitions.

=== Norwich City ===
Miquel joined Championship club Norwich City, a few hours before the close of the 2014 summer transfer window on a three-year deal with an option of a further 12 months.

Miquel made his debut on 23 September, starting in a 0–1 loss to League Two team Shrewsbury Town in the third round of the League Cup. His only other appearance of the season came on 3 January 2015 in the third round of the FA Cup, a 0–2 defeat at League One Preston North End. However, throughout the 2014–15 season, he struggled to regain his first team place at Norwich City, due to high competitions in the defense, which resulted in him at the substitute bench. Because of this, he was demoted to play in the club's development in number of matches. At one point, he was expected to be loaned out to Millwall but the move never went ahead. At the end of the 2014–15 season, Miquel made two appearances for the side.

=== Ponferradina ===
On 30 July 2015, Miquel signed a two-year deal with SD Ponferradina, after his contract with Norwich was ended early by mutual agreement.

Miquel made his Ponferradina debut in the opening game of the season, where he started the whole game, in a 2–0 win over Elche CF. In a follow-up match in a 1–0 loss against RCD Mallorca, Miquel was at fault when he gave away a penalty, resulting in Manuel Arana successfully converting the penalty. Despite this, Miquel continued to establish himself in the Ponferradina's defence. However, Miquel was sent–off for abusing a referee on 9 April 2016 against CD Mirandés, in a 4–0 loss; in which he served a four–match suspension. Despite being on the sidelines it resulted in Ponferradina being relegated, Miquel finished his first season at the club making the total of 27 appearances in all competitions. Shortly after the end of the season, he was released by the club.

=== Lugo ===
On 1 July 2016, after Ponfe's relegation, Miquel moved to CD Lugo also in the second division.

Miquel made his CD Lugo debut, in the opening game of the season, where he played the whole game, in a 2–2 draw against Gimnàstic. Two weeks after making his debut, Miquel scored his first goal for the club, in a 3–3 draw against Córdoba. Since making his CD Lugo debut, he established himself in the starting eleven for the side. He started in every match since the opening game of the season until he suffered an injury in late–October. His return from injury was short–lived when he was suspended on two occasions. He then scored again on 10 February 2017, in a 1–1 draw against Sevilla Atlético. After spending time on the substitute bench towards the end of the 2016–17 season following an injury, Miquel later regained his first team place and finished his first season, making 33 appearances and scoring 2 times in all competitions.

At the start of the 2017–18 season, Miquel missed one match, due to suspension. He then made his first appearance of the season on 27 August 2017, starting the whole game, in a 2–0 loss against Sporting de Gijón. Miquel signed a contract with the club, keeping him until 2020. He then scored his first goal of the season, in a 1–0 win over AD Alcorcón. By the time of his departure, Miquel played 16 times and scored once in his second season.

=== Málaga ===
On 7 December 2017, Miquel signed for La Liga side Málaga on a three-and-a-half-year contract. Despite being out of the transfer window, the deal was allowed to go through after an injury to Juankar.

Miquel made his Málaga debut, where he played the whole game, in a 1–0 loss against Deportivo Alavés on 22 December 2017. He featured regularly for the club during the remainder of the campaign, which ended in relegation.

=== Getafe ===
On 4 August 2018, Miquel signed a four-year contract with Getafe CF in the top tier.

==== Loan to Girona ====
On 13 August 2019, after featuring rarely, Miquel was loaned to second division side Girona FC for one year. He contributed with 24 official appearances as his club narrowly missed out promotion in the play-offs.

==== Loan to Leganés ====
On 16 September 2020, Miquel was loaned to fellow second-tier side CD Leganés, for one year.

==== Loan to Huesca ====
On 31 August 2021, Miquel moved to SD Huesca also in the second division, on a one-year loan deal.

=== Granada ===
On 26 July 2022, Miquel signed a three-year contract with Granada CF, freshly relegated to the second level. His Granada contract was terminated by mutual consent in January 2025.

=== Later career ===
On 1 February 2025, Miquel signed a six-month contract with Levante UD in the second division, with an option for a further season. On 3 July, after achieving promotion as champions, he moved to CD Leganés on a one-year deal.

== International career ==
Having previously represented the Spain U16 side, Miquel played for the Spain under-19 team after being called up for the side on two occasions. Miquel made his Spain U19 debut on 19 April 2011, starting the whole game, in a 3–0 win over Russia U19. Miquel was part of the Spain U19 squad that won the 2011 European Championship. He was ever-present, starting and playing the full 90 minutes in every game of the tournament.

In early 2013, Miquel was called up for the Spain U21 squad, and then made his debut for the Spanish U21 team on Tuesday 5 February 2013 in the 1–1 draw against Belgium, coming on as a 57th-minute substitute for Jordi Amat.

== Personal life ==
Miquel is the son of Xavier Miquel. In addition to speaking Catalan, his maternal tongue, Miquel speaks English, having the learned the language in his early career at Arsenal.

== Career statistics ==
As of match played 18 August 2023

Appearances and goals by club, season and competition
Club	Season	League			National cup		League cup		Other		Total	
Club	Season	Division	Apps	Goals	Apps	Goals	Apps	Goals	Apps	Goals	Apps	Goals
Arsenal	2010–11	Premier League	0	0	2	0	0	0	0	0	2	0
Arsenal	2011–12	Premier League	4	0	1	0	3	0	1 (Note: UCL)	0	9	0
Arsenal	2012–13	Premier League	1	0	0	0	2	1	0	0	3	1
Arsenal	Total		5	0	3	0	5	1	1	0	14	1
Leicester City (loan)	2013–14	Championship	7	0	1	0	4	1	—		12	1
Norwich City	2014–15	Championship	0	0	1	0	1	0	—		2	0
Ponferradina	2015–16	Segunda División	25	0	2	0	—		—		27	0
Lugo	2016–17	Segunda División	33	2	0	0	—		—		33	2
Lugo	2017–18	Segunda División	16	1	1	0	—		—		17	1
Lugo	Total		49	3	1	0	—		0	0	50	3
Málaga	2017–18	La Liga	20	0	1	0	—		—		21	0
Getafe	2018–19	La Liga	7	0	3	0	—		—		10	0
Girona (loan)	2019–20	Segunda División	22	0	2	1	—		—		24	1
Leganés (loan)	2020–21	Segunda División	21	0	1	0	—		—		22	0
Huesca (loan)	2021–22	Segunda División	34	4	1	0	—		—		35	4
Granada	2022–23	Segunda División	33	0	1	1	—		—		34	1
Granada	2023–24	La Liga	1	0	0	0	—		—		1	0
Granada	Total		34	0	1	1	—		—		35	1
Career total			225	7	17	2	10	2	1	0	253	11

== Honours ==
Granada

- Segunda División: 2022–23

Levante

- Segunda División: 2024–25

Spain

- UEFA European Under-19 Championship: 2011

Individual

- 2011 UEFA European Under-19 Championship: Team of the Tournament
