= Miguel Rubio (footballer, born 1998) =

Spanish footballer

Personal information
- Full name: Miguel Ángel Rubio Lestán
- Date of birth: 11 March 1998 (age 28)
- Place of birth: Leganés, Spain
- Height: 1.91 m (6 ft 3 in)
- Position: Centre back

Team information
- Current team: Valladolid

Youth career
- Getafe

Senior career*
Years	Team	Apps	(Gls)
2017–2019	Getafe B	65	(7)
2018–2022	Getafe	1	(0)
2019–2020	→ Fuenlabrada (loan)	0	(0)
2020–2021	→ Valladolid B (loan)	19	(2)
2021	→ Valladolid (loan)	2	(0)
2021–2022	→ Burgos (loan)	28	(3)
2022–2025	Granada	81	(5)
2025–2026	Espanyol	12	(1)
2026–	Valladolid	0	(0)
- * Club domestic league appearances and goals as of 27 May 2026

Miguel Ángel Rubio Lestán (born 11 March 1998), known as Miguel Rubio, is a Spanish footballer who plays as a centre-back for Real Valladolid.

== Career ==
=== Getafe ===
Born in Leganés, Madrid, Miguel Ángel finished his formation with Getafe CF. On 27 August 2017 he made his senior debut with the reserves, starting in a 2–1 Tercera División home win against CF Pozuelo de Alarcón.

Miguel Ángel scored his first senior goal on 15 October 2017, netting the opener in a 3–0 home defeat of CD San Fernando de Henares. The following 6 May he made his first team – and La Liga – debut, coming on as a second-half substitute for fellow debutant David Alba in a 1–0 away win against UD Las Palmas.

On 14 June 2019, Miguel Ángel signed a new four-year contract with Geta. On 25 July, he was loaned out to newly promoted Segunda División club CF Fuenlabrada in a season-long deal.

On 31 January 2020, after only one Copa del Rey match for Fuenla, Miguel Ángel's loan was terminated. On 14 February, he joined Real Valladolid's B-team on loan for the remainder of the season; on 18 August, his loan was renewed for a further year.

On 20 August 2021, Miguel Ángel moved to Burgos CF in the second division on a season-long loan deal.

=== Granada ===
On 26 July 2022, Rubio signed a permanent three-year deal with Granada CF in the same tier. He was a first-choice during his first season, helping the club to achieve promotion to the top tier.

=== Espanyol ===
On 11 June 2025, free agent Rubio agreed to a three-year contract with RCD Espanyol in the top tier.

=== Valladolid ===
On 22 August 2026, Rubio signed a four-year deal with Real Valladolid back in the second division.

== Career statistics ==
As of match played 24 May 2024.

Appearances and goals by club, season and competition
Club	Season	League			Cup		Other		Total	
Club	Season	Division	Apps	Goals	Apps	Goals	Apps	Goals	Apps	Goals
Getafe B	2017–18	Tercera Federación	31	2	—		4 (Note: Appearances in Segunda División B play-offs)	0	35	2
Getafe B	2018–19	Segunda División B	34	5	—		—		34	5
Getafe B	Total		65	7	—		4	0	65	7
Getafe	2017–18	La Liga	1	0	—		—		1	0
Getafe	2018–19	La Liga	0	0	—		—		0	0
Getafe	Total		1	0	—		—		1	0
Fuenlabrada (loan)	2019–20	Segunda División	0	0	1	0	—		1	0
Real Valladolid B (loan)	2019–20	Segunda División B	3	0	—		1	1	4	1
Real Valladolid B (loan)	2020–21	Segunda División B	16	2	—		—		16	2
Real Valladolid B (loan)	Total		19	2	—		1	1	20	3
Real Valladolid (loan)	2020–21	La Liga	2	0	2	0	—		4	0
Burgos (loan)	2021–22	Segunda División	28	3	2	0	—		30	3
Granada	2022–23	Segunda División	32	1	1	0	—		33	1
Granada	2023–24	La Liga	19	1	0	0	—		19	1
Granada	Total		51	2	1	0	—		52	2
Career total			166	14	6	0	5	1	177	15

== Honours ==
Granada

- Segunda División: 2022–23
