= Matías Arezo =

Uruguayan footballer (born 2002)

Personal information
- Full name: Douglas Matías Arezo Martínez
- Date of birth: 21 November 2002 (age 23)
- Place of birth: Montevideo, Uruguay
- Height: 1.77 m (5 ft 10 in)
- Position: Striker

Team information
- Current team: Peñarol
- Number: 19

Youth career
- River Plate Montevideo

Senior career*
Years	Team	Apps	(Gls)
2019–2022	River Plate Montevideo	85	(35)
2022–2024	Granada	31	(1)
2023	→ Peñarol (loan)	30	(17)
2024–2026	Grêmio	26	(3)
2025–2026	→ Peñarol (loan)	31	(15)
2026–	Peñarol	16	(7)

International career
2016–2017	Uruguay U15	28	(11)
2018–2019	Uruguay U17	26	(11)
2020	Uruguay U23	6	(1)
2023	Uruguay	3	(1)
- * Club domestic league appearances and goals as of 19 November 2026

Douglas Matías Arezo Martínez (born 21 November 2002) is a Uruguayan professional footballer who plays as a striker for Liga AUF Uruguaya club Peñarol.

== Club career ==
An academy graduate of River Plate Montevideo, Arezo made his professional debut on 14 July 2019 in a 0–0 draw against Progreso. He scored his first professional goal on 10 August 2019, in a 2–1 league win against Juventud.

On 31 January 2022, Spanish club Granada announced the signing of Arezo on a four-and-a-half-year deal. On 20 January 2023, he returned to Uruguayan league by signing for Peñarol on a loan deal until the end of the year.

On 18 July 2024, Arezo joined Brazilian club Grêmio on a four-and-a-half-year contract until December 2028. On 14 July 2025, he returned to Peñarol on a loan deal until the end of the year. On 9 January 2026, Peñarol confirmed that Arezo's loan had been extended. On 7 July 2026, he joined Peñarol on a permanent basis, signing a contract until December 2029.

== International career ==
Arezo is a former Uruguay youth international and has represented his nation at the 2017 South American U-15 Championship and the 2019 South American U-17 Championship. He scored five goals including a hat-trick against Ecuador in the latter tournament and finished second in top scorers list.

In March 2023, Arezo received his first call-up to the senior team for friendly matches against Japan and South Korea.

== Career statistics ==
=== Club ===
As of match played 19 November 2026

Appearances and goals by club, season and competition
Club	Season	League			State league (Note: Includes Campeonato Gaúcho)		Cup (Note: Includes Copa del Rey, Copa Uruguay, Copa do Brasil)		Continental		Other		Total	
Club	Season	Division	Apps	Goals	Apps	Goals	Apps	Goals	Apps	Goals	Apps	Goals	Apps	Goals
River Plate Montevideo	2019	Liga AUF Uruguaya	21	6	—		—		0	0	1 (Note: Appearance in Torneo Intermedio final)	0	22	6
River Plate Montevideo	2020	Liga AUF Uruguaya	35	13	—		—		5 (Note: Appearances in Copa Sudamericana)	2	—		40	15
River Plate Montevideo	2021	Liga AUF Uruguaya	29	16	—		—		—		—		29	16
River Plate Montevideo	Total		85	35	0	0	0	0	5	2	1	0	91	37
Granada	2021–22	La Liga	8	0	—		0	0	—		—		8	0
Granada	2022–23	Segunda División	9	1	—		1	0	—		—		10	1
Granada	2023–24	La Liga	14	0	—		—		—		—		14	0
Granada	Total		31	1	0	0	1	0	0	0	0	0	32	1
Peñarol (loan)	2023	Liga AUF Uruguaya	30	17	—		0	0	7	4	3 (Note: Appearances in championship play-offs)	0	40	21
Grêmio	2024	Série A	10	0	—		1	0	1 (Note: Appearance(s) in Copa Libertadores)	0	—		12	0
Grêmio	2025	Série A	8	1	8	2	3	1	5	2	1 (Note: Appearance in Recopa Gaúcha)	0	25	6
Grêmio	Total		18	1	8	2	4	1	6	2	1	0	37	6
Peñarol (loan)	2025	Liga AUF Uruguaya	15	8	—		4	3	2	0	3	1	24	12
Peñarol (loan)	2026	Liga AUF Uruguaya	16	7	—		0	0	6	2	1 (Note: Appearance in Supercopa Uruguaya)	0	23	9
Peñarol	2026	Liga AUF Uruguaya	17	7	—		1	0	—		1	1	19	8
Peñarol	Total		48	22	0	0	5	3	8	2	5	2	66	29
Career total			212	76	8	2	10	4	26	10	10	2	266	94

=== International ===
As of match played 20 June 2023

Appearances and goals by national team and year
National team	Year	Apps	Goals
Uruguay	2023	3	1
Total		3	1

Scores and results list Uruguay's goal tally first, score column indicates score after each Arezo goal.

List of international goals scored by Matías Arezo
No.	Date	Venue	Opponent	Score	Result	Competition
1	14 June 2023	Estadio Centenario, Montevideo, Uruguay	Nicaragua	1–0	4–1	Friendly

== Honours ==
Granada

- Segunda División: 2022–23

Gremio

- Recopa Gaúcha: 2025

Peñarol

- Copa Uruguay: 2025
- Supercopa Uruguaya: 2026

Individual

- Uruguayan Primera División Team of the Year: 2020, 2023
