= André Ferreira (footballer, born 1996) =

Portuguese footballer

Personal information
- Full name: André Filipe Magalhães Ribeiro Ferreira
- Date of birth: 29 May 1996 (age 30)
- Place of birth: Vila Nova de Gaia, Portugal
- Height: 1.93 m (6 ft 4 in)
- Position: Goalkeeper

Team information
- Current team: Moreirense
- Number: 13

Youth career
- 2005–2007: Vilanovense
- 2007–2008: Pasteleira
- 2008–2012: Boavista
- 2009–2010: → Pasteleira (loan)
- 2012–2013: União Nogueirense
- 2013–2015: Benfica

Senior career*
Years	Team	Apps	(Gls)
2015–2019	Benfica B	40	(0)
2017–2018	→ Leixões (loan)	32	(0)
2018–2019	→ Aves (loan)	8	(0)
2019–2021	Santa Clara	4	(0)
2021–2022	Paços Ferreira	32	(0)
2022–2024	Granada	26	(0)
2024	→ Valladolid (loan)	0	(0)
2024–2025	Valladolid	6	(0)
2025–	Moreirense	22	(0)

International career
2014	Portugal U18	1	(0)
- * Club domestic league appearances and goals as of 15:44, 23 July 2026 (UTC)

André Filipe Magalhães Ribeiro Ferreira (European Portuguese: [ɐ̃ˈdɾɛ fɨˈʁɐjɾɐ]; born 29 May 1996) is a Portuguese professional footballer who plays as a goalkeeper for Primeira Liga club Moreirense.

== Club career ==
=== Benfica ===
Born in Vila Nova de Gaia, Porto District, Ferreira finished his development at S.L. Benfica after being signed from local club União Nogueirense F.C. at the age of 16. He made his professional debut with the former's reserves on 24 November 2015 in a 2–1 home win against Clube Oriental de Lisboa in the LigaPro, and finished his first season with a further five league games.

Ferreira played 34 matches in the 2016–17 campaign, helping the B team to fourth position in the second division. On 1 July 2017, he joined Leixões S.C. of the same league on a season-long loan, going on make 35 competitive appearances during his spell at the Estádio do Mar.

On 31 August 2018, Ferreira renewed his contract with Benfica until 2023 and was immediately loaned to C.D. Aves. He made his Primeira Liga debut on 27 October, in a 1–2 home loss to C.D. Santa Clara.

=== Santa Clara ===
On 28 June 2019, Ferreira cut ties with Benfica and signed a four-year deal with Santa Clara also of the Portuguese top tier. During his spell in the Azores, he played second-fiddle to Marco Pereira.

=== Paços Ferreira ===
Ferreira joined F.C. Paços de Ferreira on 23 June 2021, agreeing to a three-year contract. He was in goal in both legs of the UEFA Europa Conference League's play-off round against Tottenham Hotspur, keeping a clean sheet in the first match.

Ferreira took part in 37 official games at the Estádio da Mata Real.

=== Granada ===
On 20 July 2022, Ferreira became the third Portuguese goalkeeper in as many years at Granada CF – recently relegated to the Spanish Segunda División – after Rui Silva and Luís Maximiano, signing a two-year deal. He contributed 11 matches in his first season, in a promotion to La Liga as champions.

Ferreira's first appearance in the top flight took place on 14 August 2023, in a 3–1 defeat at Atlético Madrid. He subsequently lost his starting place to newly-signed Augusto Batalla.

=== Valladolid ===
On 29 January 2024, Ferreira was loaned to second division side Real Valladolid until June. Despite being a backup to Jordi Masip as the club achieved promotion, on 30 May he signed a permanent contract until 2027.

Ferreira terminated his contract in July 2025 with only nine appearances to his credit, three of those in the Copa del Rey.

=== Moreirense ===
Ferreira returned to the Portuguese top tier on 21 July 2025, on a three-year deal at Moreirense FC.

== Career statistics ==
As of match played on 10 May 2025

Appearances and goals by club, season and competition
Club	Season	League			National Cup		League Cup		Europe		Other		Total	
Club	Season	Division	Apps	Goals	Apps	Goals	Apps	Goals	Apps	Goals	Apps	Goals	Apps	Goals
Benfica B	2013–14	Segunda Liga	0	0	—		—		—		—		0	0
Benfica B	2014–15	Segunda Liga	0	0	—		—		—		—		0	0
Benfica B	2015–16	Segunda Liga	6	0	—		—		—		—		6	0
Benfica B	2016–17	Segunda Liga	34	0	—		—		—		—		34	0
Benfica B	Total		40	0	—		—		—		—		40	0
Leixões (loan)	2017–18	LigaPro	32	0	1	0	2	0	—		—		35	0
Aves (loan)	2018–19	Primeira Liga	8	0	2	0	2	0	—		—		12	0
Santa Clara	2019–20	Primeira Liga	3	0	3	0	2	0	—		—		8	0
Santa Clara	2020–21	Primeira Liga	1	0	4	0	—		—		—		5	0
Santa Clara	Total		4	0	7	0	2	0	—		—		13	0
Paços Ferreira	2021–22	Primeira Liga	32	0	0	0	1	0	4	0	—		37	0
Granada	2022–23	Segunda División	11	0	0	0	—		—		—		11	0
Granada	2023–24	La Liga	15	0	0	0	—		—		—		15	0
Granada	Total		26	0	0	0	—		—		—		26	0
Valladolid (loan)	2023–24	Segunda División	0	0	—		—		—		—		0	0
Valladolid	2024–25	La Liga	6	0	3	0	—		—		—		9	0
Career total			148	0	13	0	7	0	4	0	0	0	172	0

== Honours ==
Granada

- Segunda División: 2022–23
