= David Crespo =

Portuguese footballer

Personal information
- Full name: David Alexandre Pereira Crespo
- Date of birth: 14 February 1994 (age 32)
- Place of birth: Lisbon, Portugal
- Height: 1.80 m (5 ft 11 in)
- Position: Defender

Team information
- Current team: Oriental

Youth career
- 2003–2004: Olivais e Moscavide
- 2004–2010: Sporting
- 2010–2012: Benfica
- 2012–2013: Nacional

Senior career*
Years	Team	Apps	(Gls)
2013	Nacional	1	(0)
2013–2014	Torreense	22	(1)
2014–2015	Sintrense	29	(2)
2015–2016	S.U. 1º de Dezembro	30	(1)
2016–2107	Mafra	19	(0)
2017–	Oriental	0	(0)
- * Club domestic league appearances and goals as of 19 March 2017

David Alexandre Pereira Crespo (born 14 February 1994) is a Portuguese footballer who plays for Oriental as a defender.

== Club career ==
He made his Primeira Liga debut for Nacional on 1 April 2013, when he was a starter in a 2–1 win over against Vitória de Guimarães.
