= Adri López =

Spanish footballer (born 1999)

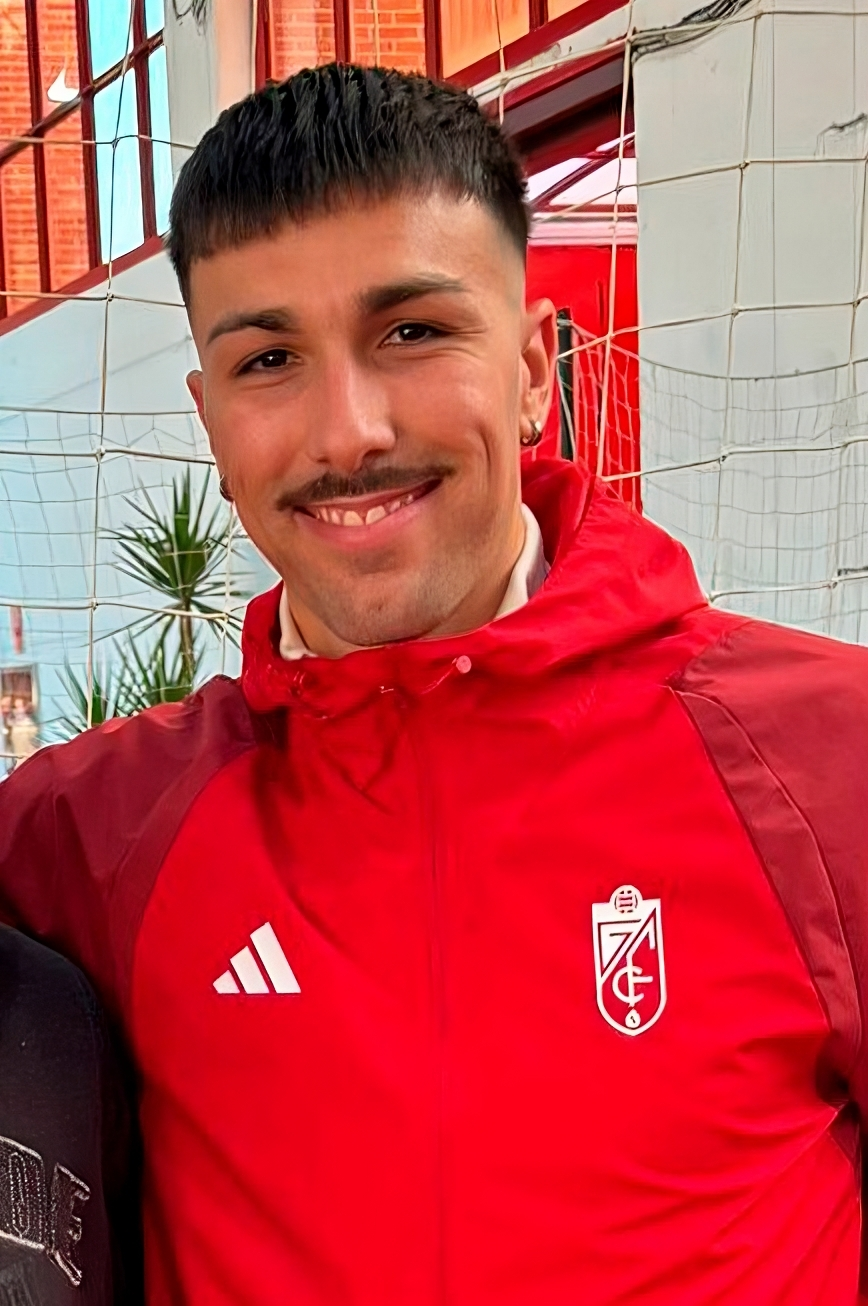

Personal information
- Full name: Adrián López Garrote
- Date of birth: 9 January 1999 (age 27)
- Place of birth: Barcelona, Spain
- Height: 1.83 m (6 ft 0 in)
- Position: Goalkeeper

Team information
- Current team: Conquense
- Number: 13

Youth career
- Vista Alegre
- 2007–2019: Espanyol

Senior career*
Years	Team	Apps	(Gls)
2018–2021	Espanyol B	34	(0)
2020–2021	→ Hércules (loan)	1	(0)
2021–2022	Hércules	26	(0)
2022–2024	Granada B	20	(0)
2022–2024	Granada	2	(0)
2025	Arenteiro	3	(0)
2025–	Conquense	25	(0)

International career
2017	Spain U17	1	(0)
- * Club domestic league appearances and goals as of 7 May 2026

Adrián "Adri" López Garrote (born 9 January 1999) is a Spanish professional footballer who plays as a goalkeeper for Segunda Federación club Conquense.

== Club career ==
Born in Barcelona, Catalonia, López joined RCD Espanyol's youth setup in 2007, from Vista Alegre. He made his senior debut with the reserves on 30 September 2018, starting in a 2–0 Segunda División B home win over SD Ejea.

A backup to Edu Frías in his first senior season, López became a regular starter in his second, after Frías left for Córdoba CF. On 5 September 2020, he was loaned to fellow third tier side Hércules CF, for one year.

López terminated his contract with the Pericos on 22 July 2021, and signed a permanent one-year deal with Hércules two days later. On 6 July 2022, he agreed to a contract with Granada CF, being assigned to the reserves in Segunda Federación.

López made his first team debut for the Nazaríes on 13 November 2022, playing the full 90 minutes in a 3–2 away success over Yeclano Deportivo, for the season's Copa del Rey. His professional debut occurred 14 days later, as he replaced field player Jorge Molina in a 1–0 Segunda División away loss against CD Leganés, after starter Raúl Fernández was sent off.

== Honours ==
Granada

- Segunda División: 2022–23
