= Raúl Torrente =

Spanish footballer

Personal information
- Full name: Raúl Torrente Navarro
- Date of birth: 11 September 2001 (age 25)
- Place of birth: San Javier, Spain
- Height: 1.93 m (6 ft 4 in)
- Position: Centre back

Team information
- Current team: Le Mans (on loan from Dinamo Zagreb)
- Number: 16

Youth career
- Cartagena
- 2017–2018: Mar Menor
- 2018–2020: Granada

Senior career*
Years	Team	Apps	(Gls)
2018	Mar Menor	1	(0)
2020–2022	Granada B	24	(0)
2021–2024	Granada	37	(0)
2024–	Dinamo Zagreb	22	(2)
2026–	→ Le Mans (loan)	1	(0)

International career^{‡}
2022	Spain U21	1	(0)
- * Club domestic league appearances and goals as of 5 September 2026 ‡ National team caps and goals as of 25 March 2022

Raúl Torrente Navarro (born 11 September 2001) is a Spanish professional footballer who plays as a central defender for Ligue 1 club Le Mans on loan from Dinamo Zagreb.

== Club career ==
=== Early career ===
Born in San Javier, Region of Murcia, Torrente represented FC Cartagena and Mar Menor FC as a youth. He made his first team debut with the latter on 8 April 2018, coming on as a late substitute in a 2–1 Tercera División home win over CD Minera.

=== Granada ===
In 2018, Torrente moved to Granada CF and returned to youth football. He was promoted to the reserves ahead of the 2020–21 campaign, and immediately became a starter for the side. On 1 September 2021, he renewed his contract until 2024.

Torrente made his professional – and La Liga – debut on 1 November 2021, replacing Luis Milla late into a 3–0 away success over Levante UD.

=== Dinamo Zagreb ===
On 4 July 2024, free agent Torrente signed for GNK Dinamo Zagreb in Croatia.

On 19 August 2026, Torrente moved on loan to Le Mans in the French top tier, with an option to buy.

== Career statistics ==
As of match played 27 April 2025

Appearances and goals by club, season and competition
Club	Season	League			National cup		Europe		Other		Total	
Club	Season	Division	Apps	Goals	Apps	Goals	Apps	Goals	Apps	Goals	Apps	Goals
Mar Menor	2017–18	Tercera Federación	1	0	—		—		—		1	0
Granada B	2020–21	Segunda División B	20	0	—		—		—		20	0
Granada B	2021–22	Segunda Federación	4	0	—		—		—		4	0
Granada B	Total		24	0	—		—		—		24	0
Granada	2020–21	La Liga	0	0	0	0	0	0	—		0	0
Granada	2021–22	La Liga	18	0	3	0	—		—		21	0
Granada	2022–23	Segunda División	2	0	0	0	—		—		2	0
Granada	2023–24	La Liga	17	0	0	0	—		—		17	0
Granada	Total		37	0	3	0	—		—		40	0
Dinamo Zagreb	2024–25	Croatian First Football League	20	2	2	0	6 (Note: Appearances in UEFA Champions League)	0	—		28	2
Career total			82	2	5	0	6	0	0	0	93	2

== Honours ==
Granada

- Segunda División: 2022–23
