= Zé Pedro (footballer, born 1993) =

Portuguese footballer

Personal information
- Full name: José Pedro Cruz Sousa Neto
- Date of birth: 10 February 1993 (age 33)
- Place of birth: Cascais, Portugal
- Height: 1.83 m (6 ft 0 in)
- Position: Left back

Team information
- Current team: Belenenses

Youth career
- 2006–2011: Tires

Senior career*
Years	Team	Apps	(Gls)
2011–2013	Tires	36	(2)
2013–2015	Sintrense	25	(3)
2015	Casa Pia	2	(0)
2015–2017	Real Massamá	26	(1)
2018–2019	Marinhense	12	(1)
2019–2021	FC Eindhoven	6	(0)
2021–2023	Belenenses	11	(0)
2022–2023	→ Oriental (loan)	0	(0)
2023–2024	Oriental	11	(0)
- * Club domestic league appearances and goals

José Pedro Cruz Sousa Neto (born 10 February 1993), commonly known as Zé Pedro, is a Portuguese professional footballer who plays for Belenenses as a left back.

== Club career ==
In 2019, Zé Pedro signed with Dutch side FC Eindhoven from Portuguese third-tier side Marinhense.

On 18 July 2021, he signed with Belenenses.

== Honours ==
=== Club ===
Real Massamá

- Campeonato de Portugal: 2016–17

== Personal life ==
Zé Pedro is of Angolan descent. He has expressed his desire to play for the Angola national team.
