= Zé Pedro (footballer, born 1981) =

Portuguese footballer

Personal information
- Full name: José Pedro Marques de Freitas
- Date of birth: 10 December 1981 (age 44)
- Place of birth: Porto, Portugal
- Height: 1.73 m (5 ft 8 in)
- Position: Midfielder

Youth career
- 1995–2000: Varzim

Senior career*
Years	Team	Apps	(Gls)
2000–2001	Varzim	2	(0)
2001–2003	Felgueiras	44	(3)
2003–2004	Braga B	25	(0)
2004–2007	Oliveirense	84	(3)
2007–2008	Gondomar	8	(0)
2008–2013	Oliveirense	99	(6)
2013–2014	Feirense	31	(1)
2014–2017	Oliveirense	111	(4)
Total		404	(17)
- * Club domestic league appearances and goals

José Pedro Marques de Freitas (born 10 December 1981 in Porto), commonly known as Zé Pedro, is a Portuguese former professional footballer who played as a midfielder.
