= Ricard Sánchez =

Spanish football player (born 2000)

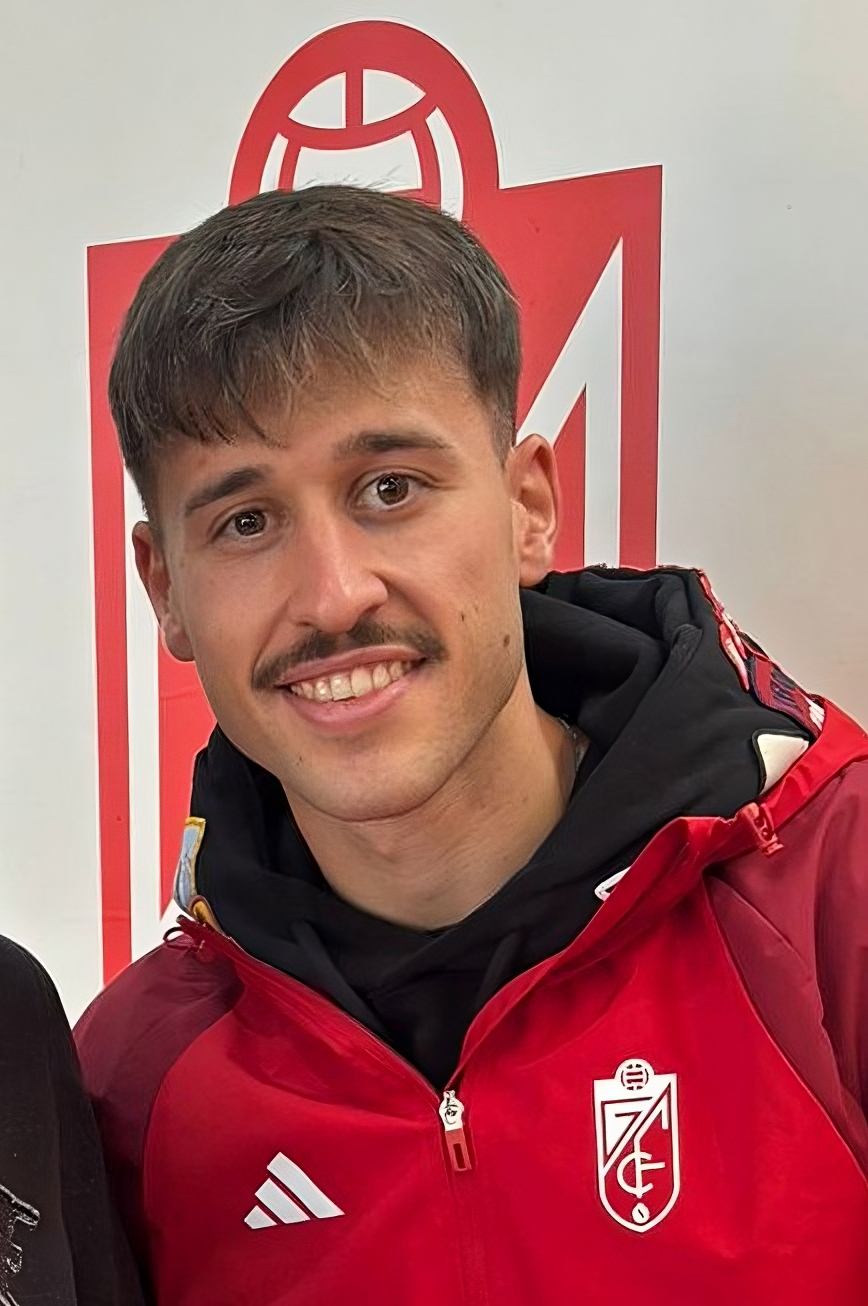
- Sánchez in 2023

Personal information
- Full name: Ricard Sánchez Sendra
- Date of birth: 22 February 2000 (age 26)
- Place of birth: Sant Jaume dels Domenys, Spain
- Height: 1.75 m (5 ft 9 in)
- Position: Right-back

Team information
- Current team: Estoril
- Number: 2

Youth career
- CFB Sant Jaume dels Domenys
- 2009–2013: Gimnàstic Tarragona
- 2013–2017: Barcelona
- 2017–2018: Toledo
- 2018–2019: Atlético Madrid

Senior career*
Years	Team	Apps	(Gls)
2018–2021	Atlético Madrid B	61	(3)
2020–2021	Atlético Madrid	1	(0)
2021–2025	Granada	100	(9)
2021–2022	→ Lugo (loan)	31	(1)
2025–	Estoril	32	(2)

International career
2018–2019	Spain U19	9	(0)
2022	Spain U21	2	(0)
Medal record
Men's football
Representing Spain
UEFA European Under-19 Championship
Winner	2019 Armenia
- * Club domestic league appearances and goals as of 14 September 2026

Ricard Sánchez Sendra (born 22 February 2000) is a Spanish professional footballer who plays as a right-back for Primeira Liga club Estoril.

== Club career ==
Born in Sant Jaume dels Domenys, Tarragona, Catalonia, Sánchez joined FC Barcelona's La Masia in 2013, from Gimnàstic de Tarragona. He left the club in 2017, and played briefly for CD Toledo before joining Atlético Madrid in 2018.

After making his senior debut with the reserves in Segunda División B, Sánchez made his first team debut on 16 December 2020, starting and scoring the second in a 3–0 Copa del Rey win against CE Cardassar. He made his professional – and La Liga – debut the following 20 February, in a 0–2 home defeat against Levante UD.

On 31 August 2021, Sánchez signed a four-year deal with fellow top tier side Granada CF, and was immediately loaned to CD Lugo in Segunda División for the season.

== International career ==
Sánchez is a former Spanish youth international. He was part of Spanish squad which won 2019 UEFA European Under-19 Championship.

== Career statistics ==
=== Club ===
As of 24 May 2024.

Appearances and goals by club, season and competition
Club	Season	League			Cup		Continental		Other		Total	
Club	Season	Division	Apps	Goals	Apps	Goals	Apps	Goals	Apps	Goals	Apps	Goals
Atlético Madrid B	2018–19	Segunda División B	13	0	—		—		0	0	13	0
Atlético Madrid B	2019–20	Segunda División B	24	2	—		—		1 (Note: Appearance(s) in Segunda División B promotion play-offs)	0	25	2
Atlético Madrid B	2020–21	Segunda División B	24	1	—		—		—		13	0
Atlético Madrid B	Total		61	3	—		—		1	0	62	3
Atlético Madrid	2020–21	La Liga	1	0	2	1	0	0	—		3	1
CD Lugo (loan)	2021–22	Segunda División	31	1	1	0	—		—		32	1
Granada CF	2022–23	Segunda División	33	3	2	1	—		—		35	4
Granada CF	2023–24	La Liga	33	3	0	0	—		—		33	3
Granada CF	Total		66	6	2	1	—		—		68	7
Career total			159	10	5	2	0	0	1	0	165	12

== Honours ==
=== Club ===
Granada

- Segunda División: 2022–23

=== International ===
Spain U19

- UEFA European Under-19 Championship: 2019
