= Myrto Uzuni =

Albanian footballer (born 1995)

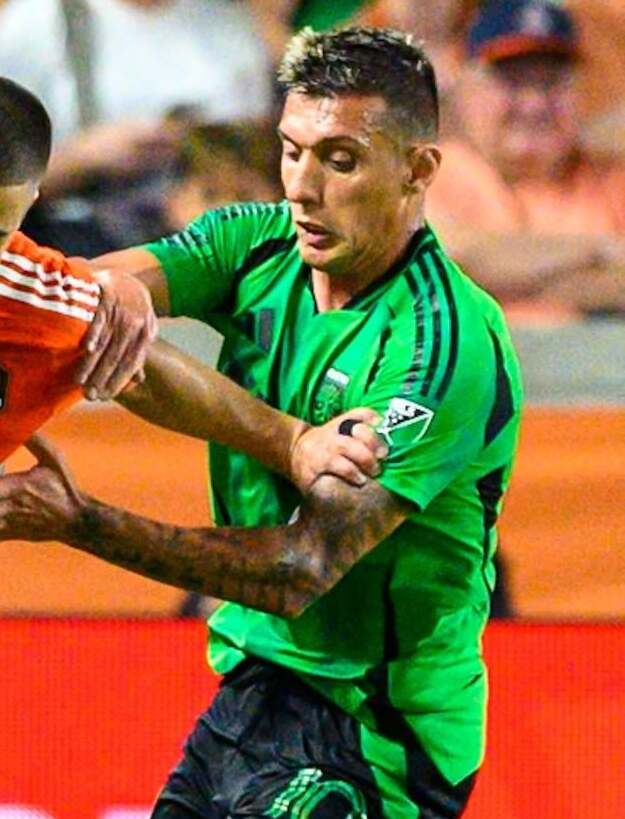
- Uzuni with Austin FC in 2025

Personal information
- Full name: Myrto Artan Uzuni
- Date of birth: 31 May 1995 (age 31)
- Place of birth: Berat, Albania
- Height: 1.78 m (5 ft 10 in)
- Positions: Forward; left winger

Team information
- Current team: Austin FC
- Number: 10

Youth career
- 2012–2013: Tomori

Senior career*
Years	Team	Apps	(Gls)
2013–2015	Tomori	23	(3)
2015–2017	Apolonia	69	(22)
2017–2018	Laçi	38	(11)
2018–2020	Lokomotiva	61	(16)
2020–2022	Ferencváros	42	(19)
2022–2025	Granada	105	(49)
2025–	Austin FC	51	(15)

International career^{‡}
2015–2016	Albania U21	8	(1)
2018–	Albania	54	(7)
- * Club domestic league appearances and goals as of 21:39, 8 November 2026 (UTC) ‡ National team caps and goals as of 15 November 2026

Myrto Artan Uzuni (born 31 May 1995) is an Albanian professional footballer who plays as a forward or left winger for Major League Soccer club Austin FC and the Albania national team.

== Club career ==
=== Early career ===
Uzuni was born in Berat in 1995, Albania, to an Albanian family. He relocated to Zakynthos, Greece, at the age of 10 with his parents and two brothers. Driven by his passion for football, he joined the academies of the Zakynthos Club Association Doxa Pigadakia. Simultaneously, he assisted his parents in their restaurant in Zakynthos. Uzuni spent seven years there until 2012, when he returned to his hometown of Berat.

Upon his return, he joined the local side Tomori and initiated his career by playing for the club's under-17 team. During the 2012–13 season, he emerged as the top goalscorer in the under-17 First Division, netting 14 goals. In the subsequent season, Uzuni continued his goal-scoring streak, scoring four times in his first four games. He then transitioned to the under-19 side, representing Tomori in a football tournament held in Spain in September 2013. Uzuni's exceptional performance contributed to Tomori's victory in the tournament, and he secured the position of the top goalscorer with seven goals. Consequently, his talent earned him a call-up to the senior team by head coach Madrid Muxhaj.

=== Tomori ===
Uzuni made his professional debut in an Albanian Cup match against Pogradeci on 24 October 2013, entering as a substitute in the 53rd minute for Fatjon Lajthia in a goalless draw. Quickly becoming a key player for the under-19s, he received another call-up to the senior team for the return leg of the Albanian Cup against Pogradeci. In his first senior start, Uzuni scored his maiden senior goal in the second minute and secured a 71st-minute winner in a 3–2 victory, advancing his team to the next round.

His league debut came in the Kategoria e Parë against Veleçiku on 14 December 2013, entering the game at half-time for Salvador Gjonaj in a 1–0 away win. Throughout his debut professional season, he made 11 league appearances, scoring one goal, contributing to his team's 4th-place finish. Additionally, he scored two goals in four Albanian Cup games, concluding his debut season with three goals in 15 games.

Having established himself in the first team under Madrid Muxhaj in the previous season, Uzuni experienced a change in management as Eqerem Memushi took charge for the 2014–15 campaign. The new coach displayed confidence in the young player by starting him in the opening game, a 1–0 win against Shkumbini. Uzuni's consistent performances included scoring twice in 11 days before the winter break in December. His displays in 2014 earned him the Tomori Player of the Year award. Shortly after receiving the award, he made a move to the top-flight side Apolonia during the January transfer window in 2015.

=== Apolonia ===
In January 2015, Uzuni signed a four-year contract with Kategoria Superiore side Apolonia. Under coach Artan Mërgjyshi, he made his debut in the Kategoria Superiore on 24 January against Tirana, ending in a 2–0 away loss. Despite Apolonia's struggles in scoring during the second half of the season, Uzuni became a regular starter, often completing full 90-minute matches as part of the front line alongside Realdo Fili, Andi Ribaj, and Marko Rajković.

Apolonia faced challenges, remaining scoreless in the first five games of the season's second half, all resulting in losses, with Uzuni forming a striking partnership with Fili and Ribaj, while Rajković remained on the bench. The team's fortunes changed with a 2–2 home draw against Kukësi on 28 February, where Uzuni scored his first goal for Apolonia in the first half, and Fili also contributed with a goal. Subsequently, with the forward trio of Fili, Uzuni, and Rajković, Apolonia secured two consecutive wins, with Uzuni assisting Fili in scoring on both occasions.

Despite these successes, Apolonia faced difficulties, losing the next three games scorelessly against top-table sides Laçi, Tirana, and Partizani. Although they managed three additional wins, frequent losses in the remaining matches led to their relegation after finishing in the penultimate place, four points behind Teuta.

=== Laçi ===
On 17 August 2017, amidst interest from various top-flight clubs, Uzuni completed a transfer to Laçi for €20,000. On the same day, he showcased his skills by playing and scoring in a friendly against Iliria, resulting in a 2–2 draw. Making his competitive debut on 10 September in the 2017–18 Kategoria Superiore matchday 1 against Partizani, Uzuni played the full 90 minutes as Laçi caused an upset with a 2–0 victory. He marked his first goal on 21 October during matchday 6 against Lushnja, contributing to a 3–0 win that lifted Laçi to 3rd place in the championship.

On 10 December, Uzuni scored his second goal of the season in a crucial match against Skënderbeu, ending their undefeated streak in the league. This victory was Laçi's first over Skënderbeu since April 2015. On 14 March of the following year, Uzuni achieved his first top-flight brace in a 3–1 win at Lushnja, hitting the crossbar twice and having a goal canceled for offside. Roza Haxhiu Stadium proved to be his favorite venue, with seven goals scored for three different teams.

In the final matchday, Uzuni scored a brace in the 4–2 home win over Teuta, securing ten goals for the campaign. Laçi finished in 4th place, earning a return to the UEFA Europa League after a three-year absence.

In July 2018, Uzuni was included in manager Besnik Prenga's squad list for the 2018–19 UEFA Europa League campaign. He made his debut in the competition on 12 July in the first leg of the first qualifying round against Anorthosis Famagusta, playing the entire match as Laçi lost 2–1. In the return leg, he scored an 89th-minute header, giving Laçi a 1–0 home win and securing progression to the next round through the away goal rule.

Uzuni's final match for the team occurred on 31 August 2018 in a 1–1 draw versus Skënderbeu, where he scored the opener with a powerful shot inside the penalty area.

=== NK Lokomotiva ===
On 3 September 2018, Uzuni made his first move abroad, joining the Croatian club NK Lokomotiva by signing a four-year contract. Laçi reportedly received €350,000, which Lokomotiva would pay in two installments. Sporting squad number 21, he made his competitive debut on 16 September in the 5–2 victory over Slaven Belupo, contributing with an assist. His first goal for the club occurred in his third league appearance, securing a 3–0 win at Gorica.

=== Ferencváros ===
On 7 August 2020, Uzuni joined Nemzeti Bajnokság I champions Ferencváros on a four-year deal for a reported fee of $1.98 million.

In Ferencváros's UEFA Champions League third qualifying round match against Dinamo Zagreb on 16 September, Uzuni scored an own goal in the first half, leveling the score at 1–1. However, he redeemed himself by netting a 65th-minute winner, leading the team to a two-legged play-off tie against Molde for entrance into the group stage.

On 29 September 2020, he was a member of the Ferencváros team that qualified for the 2020–21 UEFA Champions League group stage after beating Molde on a 3–3 aggregate (away goals) at the Groupama Aréna.

On 24 November 2020, Uzuni scored his first Champions League goal in a 2–1 away defeat against Juventus in the 2020–21 season. This goal marked a historic moment as the first one conceded by Juventus against a Hungarian side in European competitions.

On 20 April 2021, Ferencváros secured the 2020–21 Nemzeti Bajnokság I season title by defeating archrival Újpest FC 3–0 at the Groupama Arena. The goals were scored by Uzuni in the third and 77th minute, along with Tokmac Nguen in the 30th minute.

=== Granada ===
On 31 January 2022, Uzuni moved to Spanish La Liga side Granada on a three-and-a-half-year contract. Making his La Liga debut on 6 February against Real Madrid, he played as a starter, but Granada lost away 1–0. Uzuni established himself as a team starter, often featuring as a left winger. His first La Liga goal came on 7 May 2022, in his 13th league game against Mallorca, contributing to a 2–6 away victory. Three days later, he assisted Álex Collado's winning goal against Athletic Bilbao, aiding Granada in a crucial victory in the relegation battle. However, Granada narrowly missed avoiding relegation, finishing in 18th place out of 20 teams in La Liga, just 1 point behind three other teams.

Remaining with the club in the Segunda División, Uzuni made his league debut in the opening game of the season against Ibiza on 14 August 2022, playing the full 90 minutes in a 2–0 away victory. A week later, he scored his first goal of the season against Racing de Santander in the 90+1st minute, securing another 2–0 victory for Granada. In the following week, Uzuni achieved his first hat-trick in Spain against Villarreal B, leading Granada to a 3–0 victory. On 14 October, he played a key role in Granada's 5–0 victory over Sporting de Gijón, assisting Antonio Puertas' header in the 6th minute and scoring two subsequent goals (27th and 50th minute). With this win, Granada secured the second-place position, only 3 points behind the table-topping Las Palmas. On 23 October, he renewed his contract until 2026.

After a scoreless streak of six games, Uzuni once again played a crucial role, this time against Deportivo Alavés on 2 December, scoring twice and assisting once to overturn the score for Granada to 3–1. Subsequently, coach Paco López switched him to play as a center forward. He scored two goals in two occasions against Burgos on 11 December and Cartagena on 8 January 2023, contributing to Granada's two identical 1–0 victories. Later, he scored a brace against Andorra, securing another clear victory with his only goals. Despite scoring several goals only in home matches, on 5 February 2023, he managed his first away goal against Villarreal B, scoring in the 28th minute to seal a 2–0 victory for Granada, keeping the team in contention for direct promotion to La Liga. He continued his impressive form with another brace a week later against Tenerife, scoring in each half of the match as Granada secured their fourth consecutive 2–0 win. Uzuni played a pivotal role in helping his team gain promotion to La Liga by scoring 23 goals and assisting 5 in the 2022–23 season. In the 2023–24 season, he became the top scorer for his club in La Liga by scoring 11 goals.

=== Austin FC ===
On 24 January 2025, Uzuni signed with Major League Soccer side Austin FC on a three-year deal for a reported transfer fee of $12.3 million.

== International career ==
=== Youth ===
After a successful first-half season in the Albanian First Division with Tomori, which led to a transfer to the Albanian Superliga at Apolonia, Uzuni received his first international call-up for the Albania under-21s squad. Head coach Skënder Gega selected him for a 3-day mini preparatory stage in Durrës, Albania, from 22 to 25 February 2015.

In the following month, he was again called up for the 2017 UEFA European Under-21 Championship qualification Group 4 opening match against Liechtenstein on 28 March 2015. Given the number 10 shirt for his international debut, Uzuni started in the attacking line alongside fellow Albanian Superliga player Jurgen Vatnikaj, supported by Liridon Latifi and Enis Gavazaj from the wings. Albania U21 secured a 2–0 away victory, marking a winning start to the qualification campaign with goals from Rey Manaj and Liridon Latifi. Uzuni played the full 90 minutes and made an attempt to score a third goal. However, with the managerial switch, Uzuni saw reduced playing time as tactics shifted to 4-2-3-1, with Rey Manaj as the preferred lone striker. Intense competition in the offensive line, along with the arrival of Fiorin Durmishaj and talented midfielders like Latifi, Endri Çekiçi, Milot Rashica, Gavazaj, and Eros Grezda, meant Uzuni often found himself on the bench or outside the 18-man squad. Despite frequent call-ups, he played only two other games: a last-minute substitute appearance against Liechtenstein on 16 November and a full 90 minutes in the closing match against Israel in a 4–0 loss. Despite his continuous efforts, Albania U21 was eliminated, finishing mid-table with 12 points, equalized with Hungary and trailing Greece by just one point.

Uzuni scored his only goal for the youth international team on 20 May 2016 in a friendly against the Czech Republic, netting the team's only goal in a 1–1 draw.

=== Senior ===
Uzuni earned his first senior call-up on 2 October 2018, selected by manager Christian Panucci for the friendly against Jordan and the 2018–19 UEFA Nations League C third match against Israel. He made his senior debut against Jordan on 10 October, coming on as a halftime substitute for Eros Grezda. In this match, he played alongside Rey Manaj, and the game concluded in a goalless draw. Four days later, in the competitive match against Israel, Uzuni played the full 90 minutes as a right winger, but Albania suffered a 2–0 loss.

During the 2026 FIFA World Cup qualification campaign, Uzuni made seven appearances in Group K, including several starts; he scored one goal in a 3–0 home win against Andorra and also provided an assist in the return match. Albania secured qualification to the play-offs with one match remaining in the group. He also started in the play-off match on 26 March 2026 against Poland, playing the full 90 minutes as Albania were eliminated following a 2–1 defeat.

== Personal life ==
In December 2017, Uzuni revealed that his source of inspiration is the Portuguese striker Cristiano Ronaldo. Notably, on 24 November 2020, during a match against Juventus, Uzuni celebrated his goal for Ferencváros by imitating Ronaldo's celebration and exchanged shirts with the football star.

== Career statistics ==
=== Club ===
As of match played 7 November 2026

Appearances and goals by club, season and competition
Club	Season	League			National cup (Note: Appearnaces in Albanian Cup, Croatian Football Cup, Magyar Kupa, Copa del Rey, U.S. Open Cup)		Continental		Other		Total	
Club	Season	Division	Apps	Goals	Apps	Goals	Apps	Goals	Apps	Goals	Apps	Goals
Tomori	2013–14	Kategoria e Parë	11	1	4	2	—		—		15	3
Tomori	2014–15	Kategoria e Parë	12	2	1	0	—		—		13	2
Tomori	Total		23	3	5	2	—		—		28	5
Apolonia	2014–15	Kategoria Superiore	18	1	2	1	—		—		20	2
Apolonia	2015–16	Kategoria e Parë	25	5	4	1	—		—		29	6
Apolonia	2016–17	Kategoria e Parë	26	16	3	4	—		—		29	20
Apolonia	Total		69	22	9	6	—		—		78	28
Laçi	2017–18	Kategoria Superiore	35	10	7	1	—		—		42	11
Laçi	2018–19	Kategoria Superiore	3	1	0	0	4 (Note: Appearances in UEFA Europa League)	1	1 (Note: Appearance in Albanian Supercup)	0	8	2
Laçi	Total		38	11	7	1	4	1	1	0	50	13
Lokomotiva	2018–19	Croatian First League	29	7	3	1	—		—		32	8
Lokomotiva	2019–20	Croatian First League	32	9	5	3	—		—		37	12
Lokomotiva	Total		61	16	8	4	—		—		69	20
Ferencváros	2020–21	Nemzeti Bajnokság I	26	12	1	0	9 (Note: Appearances in UEFA Champions League)	3	—		36	15
Ferencváros	2021–22	Nemzeti Bajnokság I	16	7	2	8	13 (Note: Eight appearances and four goals in UEFA Champions League, five appearances and two goals in UEFA Europa League)	6	—		31	21
Ferencváros	Total		42	19	3	8	22	9	—		67	36
Granada	2021–22	La Liga	15	1	0	0	—		—		15	1
Granada	2022–23	Segunda División	38	23	1	0	—		—		39	23
Granada	2023–24	La Liga	34	11	0	0	—		—		34	11
Granada	2024–25	Segunda División	18	14	0	0	—		—		18	14
Granada	Total		105	49	1	0	—		—		106	49
Austin FC	2025	Major League Soccer	27	6	5	3	—		2 (Note: Appearances in MLS Cup playoffs)	0	35	9
Austin FC	2026	Major League Soccer	25	9	1	0	—		4 (Note: Includes appearances in Leagues Cup)	4	29	13
Austin FC	Total		53	15	6	3	–		6	4	64	22
Career total			393	135	39	24	26	10	7	4	464	174

=== International ===
As of match played 15 November 2026

Appearances and goals by national team and year
National team	Year	Apps	Goals
Albania	2018	4	0
Albania	2019	4	0
Albania	2020	4	1
Albania	2021	10	2
Albania	2022	6	2
Albania	2023	7	0
Albania	2024	3	0
Albania	2025	7	1
Albania	2026	9	1
Total		54	7

Scores and results list Albania's goal tally first, score column indicates score after each Uzuni goal.

List of international goals scored by Myrto Uzuni
No.	Date	Venue	Cap	Opponent	Score	Result	Competition
1	11 November 2020	Elbasan Arena, Elbasan, Albania	10	Kosovo	2–0	2–1	Friendly
2	31 March 2021	San Marino Stadium, Serravalle, San Marino	15	San Marino	2–0	2–0	2022 FIFA World Cup qualification
3	8 September 2021	Elbasan Arena, Elbasan, Albania	18	San Marino	5–0	5–0	2022 FIFA World Cup qualification
4	26 March 2022	RCDE Stadium, Barcelona, Spain	23	Spain	1–1	1–2	Friendly
5	24 September 2022	Bloomfield Stadium, Tel Aviv, Israel	26	Israel	1–1	1–2	2022–23 UEFA Nations League
6	24 March 2025	Arena Kombëtare, Tirana, Albania	40	Andorra	3–0	3–0	2026 FIFA World Cup qualification
7	29 September 2026	San Marino Stadium, Serravalle, San Marino	50	San Marino	2–0	3–0	2026–27 UEFA Nations League

== Honours ==
Laçi

- Albanian Cup runner-up: 2017–18
- Albanian Supercup runner-up: 2018

Lokomotiva

- Croatian Cup runner-up: 2019–20

Ferencváros

- Nemzeti Bajnokság I: 2020–21, 2021–22
- Magyar Kupa: 2021–22

Granada

- Segunda División: 2022–23

Individual

- Magyar Kupa top scorer: 2021–22
- Segunda División Player of the Month: August 2022
- Pichichi Trophy (Segunda División): 2022–23
- Leagues Cup top scorer: 2026 (shared)
