= Miki Bosch =

Spanish footballer

Personal information
- Full name: Adrià Miquel Bosch Sanchis
- Date of birth: 9 June 2001 (age 25)
- Place of birth: Alginet, Spain
- Height: 1.90 m (6 ft 3 in)
- Position: Centre-back

Team information
- Current team: Pontevedra
- Number: 4

Youth career
- 2011–2012: EF Alginet
- 2012–2013: Massanassa
- 2013–2016: Levante
- 2016–2019: Alzira
- 2020: Valencia

Senior career*
Years	Team	Apps	(Gls)
2018–2019	Alzira	1	(0)
2020–2022	Valencia B	19	(1)
2020	→ Tarazona (loan)	1	(0)
2021	→ Alzira (loan)	11	(0)
2022–2024	Granada B	47	(0)
2023–2024	Granada	2	(0)
2024–2025	UCAM Murcia	29	(2)
2025–	Pontevedra	35	(0)
- * Club domestic league appearances and goals as of 9 June 2026

Adrià Miquel "Miki" Bosch Sanchis (born 9 June 2001) is a Spanish professional footballer who plays as a central defender for Primera Federación club Pontevedra.

== Career ==
Born in Alginet, Valencian Community, Bosch represented EF Alginet, FC Massanassa, Levante UD and UD Alzira as a youth. He made his first team debut with the latter on 26 August 2018, coming on as a second-half substitute in a 3–0 Tercera División away loss against CF La Nucía.

On 2 December 2019, Bosch moved to Valencia CF and returned to youth football. On 1 October 2020, he renewed his contract with the Che until 2023, and was immediately loaned to Segunda División B side SD Tarazona.

In December 2020, after featuring in only 19 minutes for Tarazona, Bosch's loan was cut short, and he returned to Alzira also on loan. Back to Valencia in July 2021, he was assigned to the reserves in Tercera División RFEF.

On 20 July 2022, Bosch moved to another reserve team, Club Recreativo Granada in Segunda Federación. He made his first team debut the following 4 March, replacing injured Raúl Torrente in a 3–1 Segunda División away win over Burgos CF. He made his La Liga debut for Granada on 2 September 2023 in a 3–5 loss against Real Sociedad, scoring an own goal 10 minutes after coming on as a substitute.

== Honours ==
Granada

- Segunda División: 2022–23
