= Clube Oriental de Lisboa =

Portuguese association football club

Oriental
- Full name: Clube Oriental de Lisboa
- Founded: 1946; 80 years ago
- Ground: Estádio Engenheiro Carlos Salema, Lisbon
- Capacity: 8,500
- Chairman: Paulo Rosado
- Manager: Bruno Clara
- League: Portuguese District Championships
- Website: www.oriental.pt
Home colours	Away colours

Clube Oriental de Lisboa is a Portuguese football club based in Lisbon. Founded in 1946, it currently competes in the Campeonato de Portugal, holding home games at Campo Engenheiro Carlos Salema, with an 8,500 capacity.

== History ==
In January 1936, Rui de Seixas, then-president of Chelas Football Club, first raised the idea of creating a single club that represents the entire eastern part of the city of Lisbon, but he was heavily criticized for it, causing him to give up the idea almost immediately.

In April 1946, at a coffee shop, the idea of a merger is first brought up by José Marques de Oliveira, then vice-president of Chelas FC, to journalist Arthur Ines. In July 1946, the merger was voted on, with the board of directors of the three clubs: Os Fosforos, Marvilense, and Chelas, approving the project by a majority vote of 90%, and a few days later, the club was officially created by the merger of three clubs: Grupo Desportivo Os Fósforos, Marvilense Futebol Clube, and Chelas Futebol Clube. The club's colors (red shirt, white shorts, and socks in both colors) was also formally defined in the statutes, as well as the emblem, which is a mix of the old emblems of the three clubs.

The club's first game was on 15 September 1946 against reigning champion Belenenses, losing 2–1. The clubs first season was the 1946–47 season, finishing seventh in the league table of the second tier, which also included a freak 6–1 victory against Porto. In the 1949–50 season, Oriental won the league title in the Segunda Divisão and achieved direct promotion to the highest division of Portuguese football. The following season Oriental finished fifth in the first division, its highest position to date. For the rest of the 1950s, Oriental bounced between the first and second divisions, but won the league title multiple times, like in 1953 and 1956. In 1957, Oriental was relegated again, and was forced to stay in the second tier for sixteen years until achieving promotion again in 1973. Two years later, the club was relegated again, and in 1977 a stand collapsed at Estadio Engenheiro Carlos, which was considered a key factor in the club's relegation to the third tier for the first time in their history.

In 2001, the club was relegated to the fourth division, but returned to Terceira Divisão at the first attempt. The club spent the next decade between the fourth and third divisions. Oriental became one of the founders of the new Campeonato Nacional de Seniores in 2013, and at the end of the season they won first place in their promotion group, returning to the Portuguese second tier for the first time since 1989, when the tier was unified after years of being regionalized.

== League and cup history ==
Season	Tier	Pos.	Pl.	W	D	L	GS	GA	P	Cup	Notes
1995–96	3	12	34	11	11	12	41	36	44	Round 3	
1996–97	3	3	34	15	8	11	41	35	53	Round 5	
1997–98	3	2	34	19	6	9	49	34	63	Round 4	
1998–99	3	6	34	14	12	8	40	34	54	Round 4	
1999–00	3	10	38	15	11	12	44	43	56	Round 2	
2000–01	3	18	38	5	17	16	31	49	32	Round 2	Relegated
2001–02	4	1	34	21	8	5	73	26	71	Round 4	Promoted
2002–03	3	14	38	13	8	7	36	44	47	Round 4	
2003–04	3	12	38	12	12	14	45	48	48	Round 2	
2004–05	3	15	38	11	15	12	36	41	48	Round 4	
2005–06	3	16	30	1	6	23	19	65	9	Round 2	Relegated
2006–07	4	3	30	14	11	5	50	29	53	Round 2	
2007–08	4	1	26	15	7	4	45	24	52	Round 2	Promoted
2008–09	3	8	22	9	3	10	27	35	30	Round 2	
2009–10	3	4	30	14	10	6	37	25	52	Round 3	
2010–11	3	6	30	12	10	8	42	35	46	Round 2	
2011–12	3	2	30	16	8	6	49	17	56	Round 3	
2012–13	3	5	30	15	4	11	55	34	49	Round 2	
2013–14	3	2	18	11	2	5	37	17	35	Round 3	Promoted

Last updated: 25 May 2013
Ti. = Tier; 1D = Portuguese League; 2H = Liga de Honra; 2DS/2D = Segunda Divisão
3DS = Terceira Divisão; 5DS = AF Aveiro First Division
Pos. = Position; Pl = Match played; W = Win; D = Draw; L = Lost; GS = Goal scored; GA = Goal against; P = Points

== Current squad ==
As of 27 January 2023

Note: Flags indicate national team as defined under FIFA eligibility rules; some limited exceptions apply. Players may hold more than one non-FIFA nationality.

No.	Pos.	Nation	Player
1	GK	POR	André Marques
2	DF	POR	Deritson Lopes
3	DF	POR	Manuel Esteves
6	MF	POR	Gustavo Burity
7	FW	POR	Leo Morais
8	MF	CPV	Fábio Arcanjo
9	FW	BRA	Elvis Fernandes
10	MF	POR	Hugo Machado
14	DF	POR	Adilson
17	FW	POR	Tiago Gaspar
19	FW	POR	Manuel Eloy
20	DF	CPV	Léléco

No.	Pos.	Nation	Player
21	MF	POR	Rafa Santos
23	DF	CPV	Carlos Bebé
24	GK	POR	Joaquim Carvalho
29	DF	POR	Zé Pedro
32	FW	ARG	Santiago Krieger
45	DF	POR	David Crespo
49	DF	POR	Duarte Grais
50	MF	POR	Diogo Costa
73	FW	POR	Gonçalo Mendes
98	FW	POR	Didi
99	GK	BRA	Tomás Godinho

== Notable players ==
- (Portugal) João Manuel Pinto
