= 2025–26 Granada CF season =

Granada CF
2025–26 season
- President: Sophia Yang
- Manager: Pacheta
- Stadium: Estadio Nuevo Los Cármenes
- Segunda División: 14th
- Copa del Rey: Round of 32
- Top goalscorer: League: Jorge Pascual Medina; Pedro Alemañ (5 goals); All: Jorge Pascual Medina (7 goals)
- Biggest win: Granada 5–2 Real Sociedad B (4 October 2025)
- Biggest defeat: Almeria 3–2 Granada (3 January 2026)
Home colours	Away colours	Third colours

2025–26 Granada CF season describes the events and results of the 2025–26 season of the Spanish association football team CF Granada.

== Squad ==
As of 5 October 2025

Note: Flags indicate national team as defined under FIFA eligibility rules; some limited exceptions apply. Players may hold more than one non-FIFA nationality.

No.	Pos.	Nation	Player
1	GK	ALG	Luca Zidane
2	DF	ESP	Pau Casadesús
3	DF	ESP	Diego Hormigo
4	MF	ESP	Rubén Alcaraz
5	DF	ESP	Manu Lama
7	DF	ESP	Álex Sola
8	MF	ESP	Pedro Alemañ
10	FW	MAR	Mohamed Bouldini (on loan from Deportivo La Coruña)
11	FW	ESP	José Manuel Arnáiz
13	GK	ESP	Ander Astralaga (on loan from Barcelona)
14	MF	ESP	Manu Trigueros

No.	Pos.	Nation	Player
17	FW	SEN	Souleymane Faye
18	MF	CMR	Martin Hongla
19	FW	ESP	Jorge Pascual
20	MF	ESP	Sergio Ruiz (captain)
21	FW	ESP	Pablo Sáenz
22	DF	SEN	Baïla Diallo
23	MF	GEO	Luka Gagnidze (on loan from Dynamo Moscow)
24	DF	ESP	Loïc Williams
26	MF	ESP	Sergio Rodelas
28	DF	GHA	Oscar Naasei Oppong
33	FW	ESP	Samu Cortés

== Transfers ==
=== Transfers In ===
Pos.	Player	Transferred from	Fee	Date	Source
DF	(Senegal) Baïla Diallo	(France) Clermont Foot 63	Free	2 July 2025	
MF	(Senegal) Souleymane Faye	(Spain) Betis Deportivo	€600,000	8 July 2025	
FW	(Spain) José Arnáiz	(Spain) Osasuna	Free	17 July 2025	
FW	(Spain) Jorge Pascual	(Spain) Villarreal	Undisclosed	30 July 2025	
DF	(Spain) Diego Hormigo	(Spain) Sevilla Atlético	Free	13 August 2025	
FW	(Morocco) Mohamed Bouldini	(Spain) Deportivo La Coruña	Loan	29 August 2025	
MF	(Spain) Álex Sola	(Spain) Getafe	Free	1 September 2025	
MF	(Georgia (country)) Luka Gagnidze	(Russia) Dynamo Moscow	Loan	1 September 2025	
MF	(Spain) Rubén Alcaraz	(Spain) Cádiz	Free	3 September 2025	

=== Transfers Out ===
Pos.	Player	Transferred to	Fee	Date	Source
DF	(Spain) Carlos Neva	(Spain) Albacete	End of contract	1 July 2025	
DF	(Spain) Ricard Sánchez	(Portugal) Estoril	End of contract	1 July 2025	
DF	(Spain) Marc Martínez	(Spain) Lugo	End of contract	1 July 2025	
MF	(Spain) Gerard Gumbau	(Spain) Rayo Vallecano	Loan	16 July 2025	
DF	(Spain) Pablo Insua	(Spain) Real Zaragoza	Contract terminated	22 August 2025	
FW	(Argentina) Lucas Boyé	(Spain) Deportivo Alavés	€5,800,000	22 August 2025	
FW	(Spain) Stoichkov	(Spain) Deportivo La Coruña	Loan	29 August 2025	

== Friendlies ==
19 July 2025	Granada	0–2	Orlando Pirates

26 July 2025	Cádiz	1–1	Granada

29 July 2025	Granada	0–0	Qatar SC

9 August 2025	Granada	0–3	Al Ain

18 September 2025 Trofeo del Olivo	Real Jaén	3–2	Granada	Jaén
20:00				Stadium: Nuevo Estadio de La Victoria

== Competitions ==
=== Overall record ===
Competition	First match	Last match	Starting round	Record							
Competition	First match	Last match	Starting round	Pld	W	D	L	GF	GA	GD	Win %
Segunda División	16 August 2025		Matchday 1	20	4	9	7	23	27	−4	20.00
Copa del Rey	28 October 2025	6 January 2026	First Round	3	2	0	1	7	4	+3	66.67
Total				23	6	9	8	30	31	−1	26.09

Last updated: 4 January 2026
Source: Competitions

=== Segunda División ===
==== League table ====
Pos	Team	Pld	W	D	L	GF	GA	GD	Pts	Qualification or relegation
12	Albacete	42	16	11	15	56	55	+1	59	
13	Andorra	42	16	10	16	62	54	+8	58	
14	Granada	42	12	12	18	50	56	−6	48	
15	Real Sociedad B	42	12	11	19	52	61	−9	47	Not eligible for promotion
16	Leganés	42	11	13	18	43	51	−8	46 (Note: Leganés finished ahead of Valladollid on head-to-head points: Leganés 3–0 Valladolid, Valladolid 3–2 Leganés.)	

Updated to match(es) played on 31 May 2026. Source: LaLiga Hypermotion
Rules for classification: 1) Points; 2) Head-to-head points; 3) Head-to-head goal difference; 4) Goal difference; 5) Goals scored; 6) Fair-play points
(Note: Head-to-head record is used only after all the matches between the teams in question have been played)

==== Results summary ====
Overall								Home						Away					
Pld	W	D	L	GF	GA	GD	Pts	W	D	L	GF	GA	GD	W	D	L	GF	GA	GD
20	4	9	7	23	27	−4	21	2	5	3	13	13	0	2	4	4	10	14	−4

Last updated: 4 January 2026.

==== Results by round ====
Round	1	2	3	4	5	6	7	8	9	10	11	12	13	14	15	16	17	18	19	20	21	22	23	24	25	26	27	28	29	30	31	32	33	34	35	36	37	38	39	40	41	42
Ground																																										
Result																																										
Position																																										

Updated to match(es) played on 4 January 2026. Source:
A = Away; H = Home; W = Win; D = Draw; L = Loss

==== Matches ====
16 August 2025 1	Granada	1–3	Deportivo La Coruña	Granada
21:30	Hongla 54'; Lama (yellow card) 61' (yellow-red card) 66'; Sáenz (yellow card) 78'	Report	Eddahchouri (yellow card) 36', (goal) 51'; Soriano 43'; Hernández (yellow card) 70'; Escudero 90+1'	Stadium: Estadio Nuevo Los Cármenes; Attendance: 13,824; Referee: Daniel Palencia Caballero

22 August 2025 2	Eibar	3–0	Granada	Eibar
19:30	Martón 22'; Arbilla 60'; Rodríguez 70'	Report		Stadium: Ipurua Municipal Stadium; Referee: Carlos Muñiz Muñoz

31 August 2025 3	Granada	1–2	Mirandés	Granada
21:30	Haro (yellow card) 36' (red card) 48'; Sáenz 73'; Bouldini (yellow card) 76'	Report	Córdoba (yellow card) 28'; Fernández 49' (pen.); Bauzà (yellow card) 51'; Petit 85'	Stadium: Estadio Nuevo Los Cármenes; Attendance: 13,815; Referee: Marta Huerta de Aza

6 September 2025 4	Málaga	2–2	Granada	Málaga
21:00 UTC+2	Chupete 14', 20'; Montero (yellow card) 64'; Juanpe (yellow card) 68'	Report	Casadesús 30'; Bouldini (yellow card) 45+1'; Alemañ 51'	Stadium: La Rosaleda Stadium; Referee: Salvador Lax Franco

14 September 2025 5	Granada	0–2	Leganés	Granada
21:00				Stadium: Estadio Nuevo Los Cármenes

22 September 2025 6	Burgos	v	Granada	Burgos
20:30				Stadium: Estadio El Plantío

=== Copa del Rey ===
28 October 2025	Roda	1–5	Granada	Villarreal
20:00		Report		Stadium: Ciutat Esportiva Pamesa Ceràmica

4 December 2025	Tenerife	0–1	Granada	Santa Cruz de Tenerife
22:00 WET		Report	Alcaraz 61'	Stadium: Estadio Heliodoro Rodríguez López; Referee: Manuel Ángel Pérez Hernández

6 January 2026	Granada	1–3	Rayo Vallecano	Granada
19:00	Sáenz 9'	Report	García 49'; Díaz 74'; Flores 90+2' (o.g.)	Stadium: Nuevo Los Cármenes; Attendance: 4,468; Referee: César Soto Grado
