= 2024–25 Granada CF season =

Granada CF
2024–25 season
- Head coach: Guille Abascal
- Stadium: Nuevo Estadio de Los Cármenes
- Segunda División: 7th
- Copa del Rey: Round of 32
- Top goalscorer: League: Myrto Uzuni (14); All: Myrto Uzuni (14)
- Average home league attendance: 14,972
Home colours	Away colours	Third colours

The 2024–25 season was the 94th season in the history of the Granada CF, and the club's first season back in the Segunda División. In addition to the domestic league, the team participated in the Copa del Rey.

== Players ==
=== Current squad ===
As of 11 February 2025

Note: Flags indicate national team as defined under FIFA eligibility rules; some limited exceptions apply. Players may hold more than one non-FIFA nationality.

No.	Pos.	Nation	Player
1	GK	FRA	Luca Zidane
2	DF	ESP	Rubén Sánchez (on loan from Espanyol)
3	DF	ESP	Miguel Ángel Brau
4	DF	ESP	Miguel Rubio
5	DF	ESP	Pablo Insua
6	MF	CMR	Martin Hongla
7	FW	ARG	Lucas Boyé
8	MF	ESP	Gonzalo Villar
9	FW	ISR	Shon Weissman
10	FW	ESP	Stoichkov
11	FW	GEO	Giorgi Tsitaishvili (on loan from Dynamo Kyiv)
12	DF	ESP	Ricard Sánchez

No.	Pos.	Nation	Player
13	GK	ESP	Marc Martínez
15	DF	ESP	Carlos Neva (vice-captain)
16	DF	ESP	Manu Lama
17	FW	ESP	Borja Bastón
18	FW	POL	Kamil Jóźwiak
19	MF	BRA	Reinier (on loan from Real Madrid)
20	MF	ESP	Sergio Ruiz
21	FW	ALG	Abde Rebbach (on loan from Alavés)
23	MF	ESP	Manu Trigueros
24	DF	ESP	Loïc Williams
25	GK	ESP	Diego Mariño
30	FW	ESP	Siren Diao (on loan from Atalanta)

== Transfers ==
=== In ===
Pos.	Player	Transferred from	Fee	Date	Source
MF	(Georgia (country)) Giorgi Tsitaishvili	(Ukraine) Dynamo Kyiv	Loan	26 July 2024	
MF	(Brazil) Reinier	(Spain) Real Madrid	Loan	30 August 2024	

=== Out ===
Pos.	Player	Transferred to	Fee	Date	Source
MF	(Uruguay) Facundo Pellistri	(England) Manchester United	Loan return	30 June 2024	
DF	(Spain) Jesús Vallejo	(Spain) Real Madrid	Loan return	30 June 2024	
DF	(France) Faitout Maouassa	(Belgium) Club Brugge	Loan return	30 June 2024	
DF	(Poland) Kamil Piątkowski	(Austria) Red Bull Salzburg	Loan return	30 June 2024	
GK	(Argentina) Augusto Batalla	(Argentina) River Plate	Loan return	30 June 2024	
MF	(Spain) Alberto Soro	(Romania) FC Dinamo București	Contract termination	1 July 2024	
DF	(Uruguay) Bruno Méndez	(Mexico) Deportivo Toluca	Contract termination	1 July 2024	
FW	(Uruguay) Matías Arezo	(Brazil) Grêmio	€3,000,000	19 July 2024	

== Friendlies ==
=== Pre-season ===
17 July 2024 Friendly	Granada	1–1	Orlando Pirates	Marbella
19:00 UTC+2				Stadium: Banús Football Center

20 July 2024 Friendly	Almería	2–1	Granada	Motril
19:30 UTC+2	Suárez 1'; Baptistão 23'; Kaiky (yellow card) 39'; Robertone (yellow card) 70'	Report	Weissman 36'; Villar (yellow card) 42'	Stadium: Escribano Castilla; Referee: Domínguez Cervantes

25 July 2024 Friendly	Las Palmas	1–1	Granada
19:00

31 July 2024 Friendly	Sevilla	2–0	Granada	Seville
20:30 CEST (UTC+2)	Sow 22'; Saúl 49'			Stadium: Estadio Jesús Navas; Attendance: 0
Note: Behind closed doors

4 August 2024 Friendly	Granada	1–0	Al Nassr
19:30	45+2'		(penalty missed) 55'

== Competitions ==
=== Overall record ===
Competition	First match	Last match	Starting round	Record							
Competition	First match	Last match	Starting round	Pld	W	D	L	GF	GA	GD	Win %
Segunda División	15 August 2024	1 June 2025	Matchday 1	7	1	4	2	10	12	−2	14.29
Copa del Rey				0	0	0	0	0	0	+0	—
Total				7	1	4	2	10	12	−2	14.29

Last updated: 29 September 2024
Source: Soccerway

=== Segunda División ===
==== League table ====
Pos	Team	Pld	W	D	L	GF	GA	GD	Pts	Qualification or relegation
5	Racing Santander	42	20	11	11	65	51	+14	71	Qualification for promotion playoffs
6	Almería	42	19	12	11	72	55	+17	69	Qualification for promotion playoffs
7	Granada	42	18	11	13	65	54	+11	65	
8	Huesca	42	18	10	14	58	49	+9	64	
9	Eibar	42	15	13	14	44	41	+3	58 (Note: Eibar finished ahead of Albacete on head-to-head points: Albacete 0–1 Eibar, Eibar 1–1 Albacete.)	

Source: LaLiga Hypermotion
Rules for classification: 1) Points; 2) Head-to-head points; 3) Head-to-head goal difference; 4) Goal difference; 5) Goals scored; 6) Fair-play points
(Note: Head-to-head record is used only after all the matches between the teams in question have been played)

==== Results summary ====
Overall								Home						Away					
Pld	W	D	L	GF	GA	GD	Pts	W	D	L	GF	GA	GD	W	D	L	GF	GA	GD
1	0	0	1	1	2	−1	0	0	0	1	1	2	−1	0	0	0	0	0	0

Last updated: 15 August 2024.

==== Results by round ====
Round	1
Ground	H
Result	L
Position	

Updated to match(es) played on 15 August 2024. Source:
A = Away; H = Home; W = Win; D = Draw; L = Loss

==== Matches ====
The match schedule was released on 26 June 2024.

15 August 2024 1	Granada	1–2	Albacete	Granada
20:30	Miguel Rubio (yellow card) 20' (goal) 29'; Sergio Ruiz (yellow card) 45+2'; Hongla (yellow card) 45+5'; Uzuni (yellow card) 45+6'; Jóźwiak (yellow card) 86'; Carlos Neva (yellow card) 90+1'	Report	Riki (yellow card) 26'; Juan Antonio Ros (yellow card) 28'; Jon Morcillo 42'; Higinio Marín 45+3' (pen.); Agus Medina (yellow card) 69'	Stadium: Nuevo Estadio de Los Cármenes; Attendance: 13,265; Referee: (Spain) Saúl Ais Reig

24 August 2024 2	Racing de Ferrol	0–1	Granada	Ferrol
17:00	Naldo (yellow card) 83'; Moi Delgado (yellow card) 90+5'	Report	Sergio Ruiz (yellow card) 33'; Gonzalo Villar (yellow card) 79'; Ricard Sánchez 82' (yellow card) 90+1'	Stadium: Estadio Municipal de A Malata; Attendance: 7,397; Referee: (Spain) Andrés Fuentes Molina

30 August 2024 3	Granada	1–3	Huesca	Granada
19:00				Stadium: Nuevo Estadio de Los Cármenes

7 September 2024 4	Granada	1–1	Deportivo La Coruña	Granada
16:15				Stadium: Nuevo Estadio de Los Cármenes

15 September 2024 5	Elche	2–2	Granada	Elche
21:00				Stadium: Estadio Martínez Valero

20 September 2024 6	Granada	2–2	Málaga	Granada
20:30				Stadium: Nuevo Estadio de Los Cármenes

29 September 2024 7	Burgos	2–2	Granada	Burgos
16:15	López 72'; Sánchez 77'		Tsitaishvili 51'; Trigueros 73'	Stadium: Estadio El Plantío

5 October 2024 8	Mirandés	0–1	Granada	Miranda de Ebro
16:15	Alessio Lisci (yellow card) 56'; Panichelli (yellow card) 90+5'	Report	Weissman 16' (yellow card) 62'; Loïc Williams (yellow card) 38'; Ignasi Miquel (yellow card) 44'; Ricard Sánchez (yellow card) 45+1'; Corbeanu (yellow card) 90+3'	Stadium: Estadio Municipal de Anduva; Attendance: 3,016; Referee: (Spain) Sergiu Claudiu Muresan

13 October 2024 9	Granada	1–0	Córdoba	Granada
18:30	Siren Diao 90+1'	Report	Isma Ruiz (yellow card) 36'; Zidane (red card) 39'; Carlos Marín (yellow card) 90'	Stadium: Nuevo Estadio de Los Cármenes; Attendance: 18,036; Referee: (Spain) Rafael Sánchez López

19 October 2024 10	Granada	4–0	Tenerife	Granada
18:30	Gonzalo Villar (yellow card) 14'; Corbeanu (yellow card) 18'; Uzuni 20' 33'; Loïc Williams (yellow card) 57'; Boyé 81' 90+5'	Report	Aarón Martín (yellow card) 37'; David Rodríguez (yellow card) 45+2'	Stadium: Nuevo Estadio de Los Cármenes; Attendance: 16,582; Referee: (Spain) Jon González Esteban

22 October 2024 11	Castellón	2–3	Granada	Castellón de la Plana
21:00	Israel Suero 33' 35'; Raúl Sánchez (yellow card) 57'; Álex Calatrava (yellow card) 68'	Report	Reinier Jesus 26' (yellow card) 42'; Miguel Ángel Brau 49' (yellow card) 45+3'; Ignasi Miquel (yellow card) 57' (yellow-red card) 90+6'; Loïc Williams (yellow card) 90+1'; Miguel Rubio (yellow card) 90+1'; Uzuni 90+3' (pen.)	Stadium: Nou Estadi Castàlia; Attendance: 9,431; Referee: (Spain) Marta Huerta de Aza

27 October 2024 12	Granada	1–2	Levante	Granada
21:00	Hongla (yellow card) 52'; Ricard Sánchez 58'	Report	Kochorashvili 18'; Pablo Martínez 31'	Stadium: Nuevo Estadio de Los Cármenes; Attendance: 12,871; Referee: (Spain) Daniel Palencia Caballero

2 November 2024 13	Real Zaragoza	2–1	Granada	Zaragoza
18:30	Iván Azón 1' 63'; Lluís López (yellow card) 24'; Bernardo Vital (yellow card) 57'; Poussin (yellow card) 85'	Report	Ignasi Miquel (yellow card) 7'; Rubén Sánchez (yellow card) 71' (yellow-red card) 90+4'; Uzuni 84'; Jóźwiak (red card) 85'	Stadium: La Romareda; Attendance: 17,642; Referee: (Spain) Saúl Ais Reig

9 November 2024 14	Granada	3–2	Eldense	Granada
18:30	Uzuni 17' (pen.) 90' (yellow card) 90+5'; Boyé 45+1'; Tsitaishvili (yellow card) 52'; Sergio Rodelas (yellow card) 78'; Juanma Lendínez (yellow card) 81'	Report	Iván Chapela 49'; Juanto Ortuño 53'; Marc Mateu (yellow card) 79'; David Timor (yellow card) 90+5'; Đumić (yellow card) 90+5'; Joel Jorquera (yellow card) 90+9'	Stadium: Nuevo Estadio de Los Cármenes; Attendance: 15,878; Referee: (Spain) Miguel González Díaz

16 November 2024 15	Sporting Gijón	1–2	Granada	Gijón
21:00	Otero 60'	Report	Weissman 54'; Boyé (yellow card) 79'; Siren Diao 82'	Stadium: El Molinón; Attendance: 22,526; Referee: (Spain) Rafael Sánchez López

23 November 2024 16	Granada	0–0	Cádiz	Granada
16:15	Reinier Jesus (yellow card) 45+3'; Miguel Rubio (yellow card) 45+4'; Miguel Ángel Brau (yellow card) 76'; Hongla (yellow card) 90+4'	Report	Javi Ontiveros (yellow card) 45+3'; Fede San Emeterio (yellow card) 67'; Fali (yellow card) 90'	Stadium: Nuevo Estadio de Los Cármenes; Attendance: 17,704; Referee: (Spain) Dámaso Arcediano Monescillo

30 November 2024 17	Almería	2–1	Granada	Almería
16:15	Gui Guedes (yellow card) 8'; Suárez 83'; Gonzalo Melero (yellow card) 85' (goal) 87'	Report	Pablo Insua (yellow card) 40'; Uzuni 45+1'; Ricard Sánchez (yellow card) 90+3'	Stadium: UD Almería Stadium; Attendance: 13,667; Referee: (Spain) Eder Mallo Fernández

7 December 2024 18	Granada	3–0	Racing Santander	Granada
16:15	Loïc Williams (yellow card) 18'; Gonzalo Villar 23'; Pablo Insua (yellow card) 34'; Uzuni 52' 76'; Hongla (yellow card) 54'; Reinier Jesus (yellow card) 64'; Fran Escribá (yellow card) 64'; Tsitaishvili (yellow card) 76'	Report	Aritz Aldasoro (yellow card) 30'; Andrés Martín (yellow card) 53'; José Alberto (yellow card) 54'; Juan Carlos Arana (yellow card) 58'	Stadium: Nuevo Estadio de Los Cármenes; Attendance: 16,345; Referee: (Spain) Manuel Pérez Hernández

14 December 2024 19	Real Oviedo	2–0	Granada	Oviedo
21:00	David Costas (yellow card) 22'; Colombatto (yellow card) 34' (goal) 81' (pen.); Oier Luengo (yellow card) 73'; Paraschiv 85'	Report	Loïc Williams (yellow card) 33'; Sergio Rodelas (yellow card) 45+1'; Hongla (yellow card) 70'	Stadium: Estadio Carlos Tartiere; Attendance: 17,421; Referee: (Spain) Daniel Palencia Caballero

17 December 2024 20	Granada	4–1	Cartagena	Granada
19:00	Uzuni 14' 27' 73'; Gonzalo Villar (yellow card) 20'; Sergio Rodelas 35'	Report	Valles 12'; Dani Escriche (yellow card) 76'; Sergio Guerrero (yellow card) 78'; Lucas Román (yellow card) 86'	Stadium: Nuevo Estadio de Los Cármenes; Attendance: 12,536; Referee: (Spain) Oliver De la Fuente Ramos

21 December 2024 21	Eibar	1–1	Granada	Eibar
14:00	Antonio Puertas 15' (yellow card) 45+3'	Report	Pablo Insua (yellow card) 29' (goal) 82'; Hongla (red card) 64'	Stadium: Ipurua Municipal Stadium; Attendance: 4,140; Referee: (Spain) Rubén Ávalos Barrera

10 January 2025 22	Granada	0–0	Burgos	Granada
20:30	Tsitaishvili (yellow card) 44'; Loïc Williams (yellow card) 89'	Report	Edu Espiau (yellow card) 34'; Iñigo Córdoba (yellow card) 65'; Iván Morante (yellow card) 67'; Miguel Atienza (yellow card) 77'; Fer Niño (yellow card) 84'; Arroyo (yellow card) 90'; Pipa (yellow card) 90+4'	Stadium: Nuevo Estadio de Los Cármenes; Attendance: 13,758; Referee: (Spain) Marta Huerta de Aza

18 January 2025 23	Levante	3–1	Granada	Valencia
21:00	Roger Brugué 21'; Andrés Fernández (yellow card) 38'; Kochorashvili (yellow card) 58' (goal) 90+5'; Ángel Algobia 72'; Adrián de la Fuente (yellow card) 90+2'	Report	Miguel Rubio (yellow card) 18'; Boyé 58'; Loïc Williams (yellow card) 64'; Sergio Ruiz (yellow card) 81'; Manu Trigueros (yellow card) 86'; Fran Escribá (yellow card) 90+7'	Stadium: Estadi Ciutat de València; Attendance: 14,377; Referee: (Spain) Eder Mallo Fernández

26 January 2025 24	Granada	3–1	Sporting Gijón	Granada
14:00	Boyé 28' (pen.); Hongla 67'; Manu Lama 90'	Report	Róber Pier (yellow card) 25'; Otero 83' (pen.); César Gelabert (yellow card) 87'	Stadium: Nuevo Estadio de Los Cármenes; Attendance: 15,450; Referee: (Spain) Carlos Muñiz Muñoz

31 January 2025 25	Eldense	0–3	Granada	Elda
20:30	Marc Mateu (yellow card) 36'	Report	Stoichkov 42'; Sergio Ruiz (yellow card) 51'; Kochorashvili 62' (yellow card) 72'; Miguel Ángel Brau 90' (yellow card) 90+4'	Stadium: Nuevo Pepico Amat; Attendance: 4,294; Referee: (Spain) Salvador Lax Franco

8 February 2025 26	Granada	0–0	Mirandés	Granada
16:15	Gonzalo Villar (yellow card) 9'; Hongla (yellow card) 37'; Loïc Williams (yellow card) 80'; Miguel Ángel Brau (yellow card) 80'	Report	Juan Gutiérrez (yellow card) 64'; Víctor Parada (yellow card) 71'; Iker Benito (yellow card) 90'; Joel Roca (yellow card) 90+4'	Stadium: Nuevo Estadio de Los Cármenes; Attendance: 15,823; Referee: (Spain) Rafael Sánchez López

16 February 2025 27	Huesca	1–1	Granada	Huesca
16:15	Blasco (yellow card) 37'; Soko 76'; Óscar Sielva (yellow card) 90+4'	Report	Gonzalo Villar (yellow card) 26'; Ricard Sánchez (red card) 45+2'; Boyé 84' (yellow card) 89'	Stadium: Estadio El Alcoraz; Attendance: 7,427; Referee: (Spain) Andrés Fuentes Molina

22 February 2025 28	Granada	2–2	Real Zaragoza	Granada
18:30	Loïc Williams (yellow card) 18'; Rebbach 23'; Gonzalo Villar (red card) 35'; Kochorashvili 48'; Manu Lama (yellow card) 81'; Stoichkov (red card) 90+7'	Report	Mario Soberón (yellow card) 17'; Jair Amador (yellow card) 58'; Adrián Liso (yellow card) 74'; Alberto Marí 90+2'; Pau Sans 90+4'	Stadium: Nuevo Estadio de Los Cármenes; Attendance: 15,266; Referee: (Spain) Germán Cid Camacho

2 March 2025 29	Córdoba	5–0	Granada	Córdoba
14:00	Álex Sala 7' 25'; Cristian Carracedo 49' (yellow card) 50'; Jacobo González (yellow card) 54'; Antonio Casas (yellow card) 68'; Carlos Isaac (yellow card) 71'; Pedro Ortiz 78'; Zidane 84' (o.g.)	Report	Loïc Williams (yellow card) 32'; Boyé (yellow card) 71'	Stadium: Estadio Nuevo Arcángel; Attendance: 16,879; Referee: (Spain) Jon González Esteban

9 March 2025 30	Granada	3–0	Racing Ferrol	Granada
21:00	Hongla (yellow card) 18'; Manu Lama 32'; Rubén Sánchez 36'; Kochorashvili 58'	Report	David Castro (yellow card) 45+4'	Stadium: Nuevo Estadio de Los Cármenes; Attendance: 6,143; Referee: (Spain) Salvador Lax Franco

16 March 2025 31	Cádiz	1–0	Granada	Cádiz
18:30	Chris Ramos 28'; Diakité (yellow card) 32'; Fede San Emeterio (yellow card) 77'	Report		Stadium: Nuevo Mirandilla; Attendance: 14,540; Referee: (Spain) Eder Mallo Fernández

22 March 2025 32	Granada	1–0	Real Oviedo	Granada
21:00	Boyé 11'; Rebbach (yellow card) 63'	Report	Alemão (yellow card) 53'; David Costas (yellow card) 58'; Hassan (yellow card) 71'	Stadium: Nuevo Estadio de Los Cármenes; Attendance: 9,969; Referee: (Spain) Dámaso Arcediano Monescillo

28 March 2025 33	Tenerife	2–1	Granada	Santa Cruz de Tenerife
20:30	Manu Lama 54' (o.g.); Luismi Cruz 78'; Fabio González (yellow card) 90+7'	Report	Boyé 36' (pen.); Manu Trigueros (yellow card) 45+1'; Carlos Neva (yellow card) 61'; Sergio Ruiz (yellow card) 61'; Manu Lama (red card) 75'; Loïc Williams (yellow card) 80'; Miguel Rubio (yellow card) 90+4'	Stadium: Estadio Heliodoro Rodríguez López; Attendance: 11,838; Referee: (Spain) Miguel González Díaz

5 April 2025 34	Granada	3–1	Granada	Granada
18:30	Boyé 10' (pen.); Hongla (yellow card) 68'; Gonzalo Villar 78'; Miguel Rubio 85'	Report	Suárez (yellow card) 17'; Gonzalo Melero 46'; Lopy (yellow card) 55'	Stadium: Nuevo Estadio de Los Cármenes; Attendance: 16,598; Referee: (Spain) Saúl Ais Reig

=== Copa del Rey ===
30 October 2024 First Round	Cortes	0-2	Granada	Tudela
20:00	Jorge Lahuerta (yellow card) 19'; Carlos Moratalla (yellow card) 63'	Report	Weissman 31'; Jóźwiak (yellow card) 39'; Dani Salas 67' (o.g.)	Stadium: Estadio Ciudad de Tudela; Attendance: 2,000; Referee: (Spain) Eder Mallo Fernández

3 December 2024 Second Round	Real Zaragoza	2-2 (a.e.t.) (4-5 p)	Granada	Zaragoza
21:00	Alberto Marí (yellow card) 17'; Malcom Adu Ares 18' 45+3'; Pau Sans (yellow card) 40'; Dani Tasende (yellow card) 45+2'; Aitor Mañas (yellow card) 90+2'; Iván Calero (yellow card) 109'; Bare (yellow card) 109'	Report	Lucas Pérez (yellow card) 35'; Loïc Williams (yellow card) 40'; Weissman 42' (yellow card) 109'; Enrique Clemente 45' (o.g.); Miguel Rubio (yellow card) 98'; Sergio Ruiz (yellow card) 120'	Stadium: La Romareda; Attendance: 10,153; Referee: (Spain) Germán Cid Camacho

3 January 2025 Round of 32	Granada	0-1 (a.e.t.)	Getafe	Granada
19:00	Rubén Sánchez (yellow card) 6'; Loïc Williams (yellow card) 31'; Gonzalo Villar (yellow card) 112'; Reinier Jesus (yellow card) 116'; Ricard Sánchez (yellow card) 122'	Report	Diego Rico (yellow card) 42'; Coba da Costa (yellow card) 80'; Borja Mayoral 93'; David Argüelles (yellow card) 114'; Jesús Santiago (yellow card) 116'; Letáček (yellow card) 118'	Stadium: Nuevo Estadio de Los Cármenes; Attendance: 16,616; Referee: (Spain) José María Sánchez Martínez
