= Lucas Pérez (footballer, born 2003) =

Spanish footballer (born 2003)

Personal information
- Full name: Lucas Pérez Calvo
- Date of birth: 5 December 2003 (age 22)
- Place of birth: Santander, Spain
- Height: 1.84 m (6 ft 0 in)
- Position: Centre back

Team information
- Current team: Guadalajara (on loan from Alcorcón)
- Number: 2

Youth career
- Racing Santander
- 2019–2022: Atlético Madrid

Senior career*
Years	Team	Apps	(Gls)
2023–2024	Estepona	39	(1)
2024–2025	Granada B	24	(1)
2024–2025	Granada	0	(0)
2025–	Alcorcón	3	(0)
2026–	→ Guadalajara (loan)	11	(1)
- * Club domestic league appearances and goals as of 10 June 2026

Lucas Pérez Calvo (born 5 December 2003) is a Spanish footballer who plays mainly as a centre-back for Primera Federación club Guadalajara on loan from Alcorcón.

== Career ==
Pérez was born in Santander, Cantabria, and joined Atlético Madrid's youth sides in 2019, from Racing de Santander. On 2 September 2022, after finishing his formation, he moved to Segunda Federación side CD Estepona FS.

Pérez made his senior debut on 4 September 2022, starting in a 2–2 away draw against CD Leganés B, and scored his first goal the following 8 January, in a 3–1 home win over AD Unión Adarve. On 1 June 2023, he renewed his contract with the club for a further year.

On 16 July 2024, Pérez moved to Granada CF and was initially assigned to the reserves also in the fourth division. He made his first team debut on 30 October, coming on as a late substitute for Sergio Rodelas in a 2–0 away win over CD Cortes, for the season's Copa del Rey.

Pérez made his professional debut on 3 December 2024, starting in a 2–2 draw at Real Zaragoza (5–4 penalty win), also for the national cup.

On 29 January 2026, Pérez moved to Guadalajara on loan.
