= D'Ávila Messi Kessie =

Ivorian footballer (born 2000)

Personal information
- Full name: D'Ávila Messi Kessie
- Date of birth: 20 January 2000 (age 26)
- Place of birth: Abidjan, Ivory Coast
- Height: 1.67 m (5 ft 6 in)
- Position: Left winger

Team information
- Current team: ISCA

Youth career
- –2020: Granada

Senior career*
Years	Team	Apps	(Gls)
2019–2020	→ Huétor Vega (loan)	17	(1)
2020–2022	Panserraikos	23	(0)
2023–	ISCA		
- * Club domestic league appearances and goals as of 1 May 2022

D'Ávila Messi Kessie (born 20 January 2000) is an Ivorian professional footballer who plays as a winger for Ivorian club ISCA.
