= Luka Gagnidze =

Georgian footballer

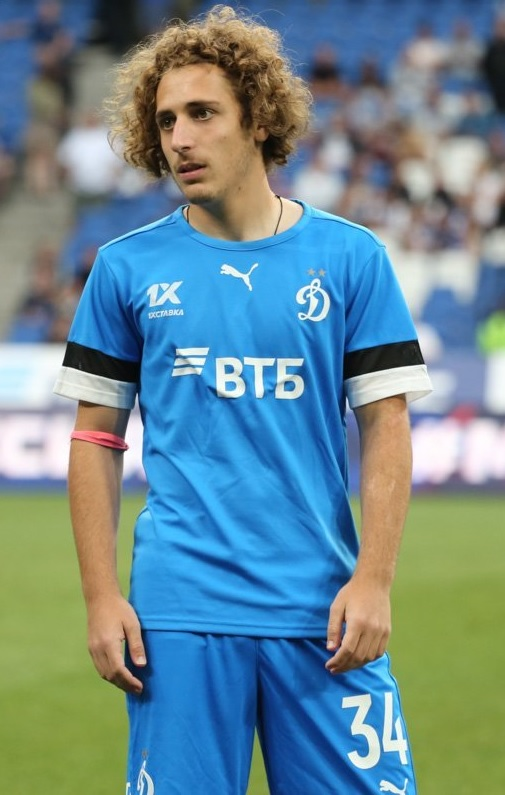
- Gagnidze with Dynamo Moscow in 2022

Personal information
- Date of birth: 28 February 2003 (age 23)
- Place of birth: Kutaisi, Georgia
- Height: 1.75 m (5 ft 9 in)
- Position: Midfielder

Youth career
- Dinamo Tbilisi

Senior career*
Years	Team	Apps	(Gls)
2020–2021	Dinamo Tbilisi	17	(1)
2021–2026	Dynamo Moscow	34	(2)
2021–2022	→ Ural Yekaterinburg (loan)	11	(0)
2022	→ Raków Częstochowa (loan)	1	(0)
2025	→ Krylia Sovetov Samara (loan)	8	(0)
2025–2026	→ Granada (loan)	10	(0)

International career^{‡}
2019	Georgia U16	2	(1)
2019–2020	Georgia U17	9	(0)
2021	Georgia U19	5	(0)
2021–	Georgia U21	24	(1)
2023–	Georgia	4	(0)
- * Club domestic league appearances and goals as of 8 October 2026 ‡ National team caps and goals as of 18 June 2025

Luka Gagnidze (Georgian: ლუკა გაგნიძე; born 28 February 2003) is a Georgian professional footballer who plays as a central midfielder.

== Club career ==
Born in Kutaisi, Gagnidze took first steps in football at Torpedo academy. He was ten years old when he moved to Dinamo Tbilisi academy. At age 16 Gagnidze was widely recognized as a talented player. In 2019 some media outlets named him among ten Georgian sportsmen expected to shine in the upcoming years. Being at that time a key U17 team member, he received the Alexandre Chivadze Golden medal, annually given by the Football Federation to distinguished young players.

He regularly featured in Dinamo Tbilisi under Georgi Nemsadze.

On 5 July 2021, Gagnidze signed a five-year contract with Russian Premier League club Dynamo Moscow On 21 July 2021, he was loaned to another RPL club Ural Yekaterinburg for the 2021–22 season.

He made his Russian Premier League debut for Ural on 1 August 2021 in a game against Nizhny Novgorod. He substituted Vyacheslav Podberyozkin in the 58th minute.

On 10 March 2022, Gagnidze's contract with Ural was suspended until 30 June 2022 (which is the end of his loan term) according to special FIFA regulations related to the Russian invasion of Ukraine.

On 25 March 2022, he signed a short-term deal with Polish Ekstraklasa side Raków Częstochowa.

On 18 February 2025, Gagnidze was loaned by Krylia Sovetov Samara. On 1 September, he moved to Spanish club Granada on a one-year loan deal.

On 7 October 2026, his contract with Dynamo Moscow was mutually terminated.

== International career ==
Gagnidze made his debut for the national team in a friendly 6–1 win over Mongolia on 25 March 2023.

In June 2023, he was called up to the U21 squad taking part in the European Championship. Two years later, Gagnidze took part in two out of three matches the team held in the Euro Under-21. He played in 24 matches in total, scoring in a vital playoff game against Croatia.

== Career statistics ==
=== Club ===
As of match played 9 June 2026

Appearances and goals by club, season and competition
Club	Season	League			Cup		Europe		Total	
Club	Season	Division	Apps	Goals	Apps	Goals	Apps	Goals	Apps	Goals
Dinamo Tbilisi	2020	Erovnuli Liga	2	0	—		0	0	2	0
Dinamo Tbilisi	2021	Erovnuli Liga	15	1	1	0	—		16	1
Dinamo Tbilisi	Total		17	1	1	0	0	0	18	1
Dynamo Moscow	2022–23	Russian Premier League	20	0	7	0	—		27	0
Dynamo Moscow	2023–24	Russian Premier League	10	0	5	0	—		15	0
Dynamo Moscow	2024–25	Russian Premier League	4	2	7	1	—		11	3
Dynamo Moscow	2025–26	Russian Premier League	0	0	2	0	—		2	0
Dynamo Moscow	Total		34	2	21	1	—		55	3
Ural Yekaterinburg (loan)	2021–22	Russian Premier League	11	0	2	0	—		13	0
Raków Częstochowa (loan)	2021–22	Ekstraklasa	1	0	0	0	—		1	0
Krylia Sovetov Samara	2024–25	Russian Premier League	8	0	—		—		8	0
Granada (loan)	2025–26	Segunda División	10	0	3	0	—		13	0
Career total			81	3	27	1	0	0	108	4

=== International ===
As of 17 October 2023

Appearances and goals by national team and year
National team	Year	Apps	Goals
Georgia	2023	5	0
Total		5	0
