= Pablo Sáenz =

Spanish footballer

Personal information
- Full name: Pablo Sáenz Ezquerra
- Date of birth: 22 May 2001 (age 25)
- Place of birth: San Adrián, Spain
- Height: 1.75 m (5 ft 9 in)
- Position: Winger

Team information
- Current team: Oviedo

Youth career
- San Adrián
- Falcesino
- Brooke House
- Calahorra

Senior career*
Years	Team	Apps	(Gls)
2019–2022	Calahorra B	54	(15)
2022–2023	Calahorra	19	(1)
2022–2023	→ Alfaro (loan)	2	(0)
2023–2024	Granada B	35	(3)
2024–2026	Granada	54	(4)
2025	→ Albacete (loan)	16	(5)
2026–	Oviedo	0	(0)
- * Club domestic league appearances and goals as of 31 May 2026

Pablo Sáenz Ezquerra (born 22 May 2001) is a Spanish professional footballer who plays mainly as a left winger for Real Oviedo.

== Career ==
Born in San Adrián, Navarre, Sáenz represented CD San Adrián, CD Falcesino, Brooke House Football Academy and CD Calahorra as a youth. After making his senior debut with the reserves in Tercera División in 2019, he made his first team debut on 28 May 2022, coming on as a second-half substitute in a 2–1 Primera División RFEF home loss to CF Talavera de la Reina.

On 25 June 2022, Sáenz was loaned to Segunda Federación side CD Alfaro for the season. The following 5 January, after being rarely used, he was recalled by his parent club and permanently assigned to the main squad.

On 31 July 2023, after suffering relegation with Calahorra, Sáenz signed for Granada CF and was assigned to the B-team also in the third division. He made his first team – and La Liga – debut on 24 May of the following year, replacing Ricard Sánchez in a 7–0 away loss to Girona FC.

Sáenz was definitely promoted to the main squad, now in Segunda División, ahead of the 2024–25 season. On 2 February 2025, however, he moved on loan to fellow second division side Albacete Balompié.

Sáenz scored his first professional goal on 7 February 2025, netting Alba's opener in a 2–1 home win over Real Zaragoza. He returned to his parent club in July after having scored five goals, but was again mainly a backup option in the 2025–26 campaign.

On 1 June 2026, Sáenz agreed to a two-year deal with Real Oviedo, recently relegated to division two.
