= Chinaza Okonyia =

Nigerian footballer

Personal information
- Full name: Chinaza Marvellous Onouha Okonyia
- Date of birth: 10 April 2005 (age 21)
- Place of birth: Nigeria
- Position: Forward

Team information
- Current team: Granada
- Number: 19

Senior career*
Years	Team	Apps	(Gls)
2024–2025	Iskra Szydłowo		
2025–2026	Plasencia	23	(23)
2026–	Granada	1	(0)
- * Club domestic league appearances and goals as of 15 August 2026

Chinaza Marvellous Onouha Okonyia (born 10 April 2005), sometimes known as just Chinaza, is a Nigerian professional footballer who plays as a forward for Segunda División club Granada.

== Career ==
In August 2025, Chinaza was announced as the new signing of Primera Extremeña side UP Plasencia from a Polish lower league side; he was recommended by former player Luismi Álvarez, after he received videos of several players through an agent. In the 2025–26 season, he scored 34 goals in just 32 matches to help the club to achieve promotion to Tercera Federación.

On 26 June 2026, Chinaza signed for Granada CF, being initially assigned to the reserves also in the fifth division. He spent the entire pre-season with the first team, and was definitely promoted to the squad on 14 August, agreeing to a new four-year contract.

Chinaza made his professional debut on 15 August 2026, starting in a 0–0 away draw against Real Oviedo.
