= Oscar Naasei =

Ghanaian footballer

Personal information
- Full name: Oscar Naasei Oppong
- Date of birth: 24 February 2005 (age 21)
- Place of birth: Accra, Ghana
- Height: 1.85 m (6 ft 1 in)
- Position: Centre-back

Team information
- Current team: Real Madrid B
- Number: 21

Youth career
- Emmanuel City
- 2023–2024: Granada

Senior career*
Years	Team	Apps	(Gls)
2023	Granada C	2	(0)
2024–2025	Granada B	23	(0)
2024–2026	Granada	45	(1)
2026–	Real Madrid B	0	(0)

International career^{‡}
2026–	Ghana	1	(0)
- * Club domestic league appearances and goals as of 24 August 2026 ‡ National team caps and goals as of 22 May 2026

Oscar Naasei Oppong (born 24 February 2005) is a Ghanaian professional footballer who plays as a centre-back for Spanish club Real Madrid Castilla and the Ghana national team.

== Club career ==
=== Granada ===
Born in Accra, Naasei played for local side Emmanuel City Football Academy before joining Granada CF in August 2023. Initially a member of the Juvenil squad, he featured with the C-team in Tercera Andaluza before making his debut with the reserves on 17 March 2024, starting in a 4–3 Primera Federación away loss to UD Melilla.

On 11 July 2024, Naasei renewed his contract with the Andalusians. After impressing during the pre-season, he made his first team debut on 27 October, starting in a 2–1 Segunda División home loss to Levante UD.

Naasei scored his first professional goal on 4 October 2025, netting Granada's fifth in a 5–2 home win over Real Sociedad B.

=== Real Madrid ===
On 27 August 2026, Granada announced Naasei's transfer to Real Madrid, and he was initially assigned to the B-team in Primera Federación.

== International career ==
On 6 May 2026, Naasei was called up to the Ghana national team for a friendly against Mexico. He made his full international debut sixteen days later, starting in the 2–0 loss at the Estadio Azteca, but was left out of the squad for the 2026 FIFA World Cup.
