= Joseba Aguado =

Spanish football manager

Personal information
- Full name: José Manuel Aguado Fernández
- Date of birth: 9 June 1969 (age 57)
- Place of birth: Granada, Spain

Managerial career
- Years: Team
- 2000–2004: Vandalia Peligros
- 2007–2009: Huétor Tájar
- 2009–2010: Santa Fe
- 2010–2015: Granada B
- 2015: Granada (interim)
- 2016–2017: Maracena
- 2017: Linares
- 2019–2021: Huétor Vega

José Manuel 'Joseba' Aguado Fernández (born 3 February 1979) is a Spanish football coach.

== Manager career ==
Born in Granada, Andalusia, Aguado began his managerial career with Vandalia de Peligros CF in Tercera División. In 2007, he was appointed manager of CD Huétor Tájar, achieving two consecutive promotions but being sacked on 28 May 2009.

In September 2009 Aguado was named CD Santa Fe manager, with the side also in the third level. On 29 June of the following year, after avoiding relegation, he was appointed at the helm of Granada CF B.

Aguado achieved two consecutive promotions with the Rojiblancos, taking the team to Segunda División B for the first time ever and renewing his link on 9 July 2013. On 16 January 2015 he was appointed interim manager of the main squad in La Liga, replacing fired Joaquín Caparrós.

Aguado appeared in his first professional match two days later, a 0–2 away loss against Atlético Madrid. On 11 June 2015 he left Granada, after five years in charge of the B-side.

On 14 June 2016, Aguado was appointed in charge of UD Maracena.
