= Mario Gambín =

Spanish footballer

Personal information
- Full name: Mario Jiménez Gambín
- Date of birth: 13 February 2007 (age 19)
- Place of birth: Molina de Segura, Spain
- Height: 1.73 m (5 ft 8 in)
- Position: Midfielder

Team information
- Current team: Granada
- Number: 27

Youth career
- 2015–2017: Murcia
- 2017–2018: Olimpic Murcia
- 2018–2019: Los Garres
- 2019–2023: UCAM Murcia
- 2023–2025: Granada

Senior career*
Years	Team	Apps	(Gls)
2024–2025	Granada C	5	(1)
2025–	Granada B	23	(3)
2025–	Granada	5	(0)
- * Club domestic league appearances and goals as of 30 August 2026

Mario Jiménez Gambín (born 13 February 2007) is a Spanish professional footballer who plays as a midfielder for Granada CF.

== Career ==
Born in Molina de Segura, Region of Murcia, Gambín played for Real Murcia CF, Olimpic Club Murcia, UD Los Garres, UCAM Murcia CF and Granada CF, having joined the latter in 2023. After progressing through the youth sides, he made his senior debut with the C-team on 22 September 2024, starting in a 2–1 Segunda Andaluza away win over Churriana de la Vega CF B, and scored his first senior goal on 6 October, in a 5–0 away routing of CF Ogíjares 89.

Ahead of the 2025–26 season, Gambín was promoted to the reserves in Tercera Federación, while also making the pre-season with the main squad. He made his professional debut on 16 August 2025, coming on as a second-half substitute for fellow youth graduate Sergio Rodelas in a 3–1 Segunda División home loss to Deportivo de La Coruña; aged 18 years and one month, he became the youngest player to debut for the club in the 21st century.

On 20 July 2026, Gambín renewed his link with the Nazaríes until 2029.
