= Dylan Rodríguez =

Dylan Rodríguez may refer to:

- Dylan Rodríguez (footballer), Spanish football midfielder
- Dylan Rodríguez (scholar), American Ethnic studies scholar and writer
