= Pere Haro =

Spanish footballer

Personal information
- Full name: Pere Haro Crespo
- Date of birth: 20 May 2004 (age 22)
- Place of birth: Sant Pere de Ribes, Spain
- Height: 1.81 m (5 ft 11 in)
- Position: Left-back

Team information
- Current team: Lugo
- Number: 6

Youth career
- Ribes
- EF Gavà
- 2016–2017: Espanyol
- 2017–2020: Cornellà
- 2020–2021: San Francisco
- 2021–2023: Mallorca

Senior career*
Years	Team	Apps	(Gls)
2023–2024	Vilafranca	13	(0)
2024–2025	Montijo	14	(0)
2024–2025	→ Utebo (loan)	17	(2)
2025–2026	Granada B	9	(0)
2025–2026	Granada	2	(0)
2026–	Lugo	12	(0)
- * Club domestic league appearances and goals as of 9 June 2026

Pere Haro Crespo (born 20 May 2004) is a Spanish professional footballer who plays as a left-back for Primera Federación club Lugo.

== Career ==
Born Sant Pere de Ribes, Barcelona, Catalonia, Haro played for CD Ribes and EF Gavà before joining RCD Espanyol's youth sides in 2016. He left the club in the following year, and subsequently represented UE Cornellà, CD San Francisco and RCD Mallorca before signing for Tercera Federación side FC Vilafranca in 2023.

On 31 January 2024, Haro moved to UD Montijo in Segunda Federación. On 7 July, after suffering relegation, he was loaned to fellow league team Utebo FC, for one year.

On 23 January 2025, Haro agreed to a deal with Granada CF, being initially assigned to the reserves also in division four. He renewed his contract in July after making the pre-season with the first team, and made his professional debut on 22 August, starting in a 3–0 Segunda División away loss to SD Eibar.

On 2 February 2026, Haro signed a one-and-a-half-season contract with Primera Federación club CD Lugo.
