= Reinier Jesus =

Brazilian footballer (born 2002)

Reinier
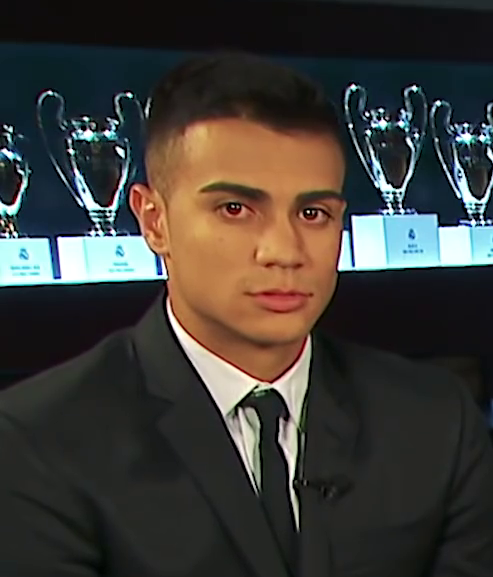
- Reinier during an interview with Real Madrid TV in 2020

Personal information
- Full name: Reinier Jesus Carvalho
- Date of birth: 19 January 2002 (age 24)
- Place of birth: Brasília, Distrito Federal, Brazil
- Height: 1.85 m (6 ft 1 in)
- Position: Attacking midfielder

Team information
- Current team: Atlético Mineiro
- Number: 19

Youth career
- 2011: Vasco da Gama
- 2011–2012: Botafogo
- 2012–2013: Fluminense
- 2014–2019: Flamengo

Senior career*
Years	Team	Apps	(Gls)
2019–2020	Flamengo	14	(6)
2020–2025	Real Madrid	0	(0)
2020	Real Madrid Castilla	3	(2)
2020–2022	→ Borussia Dortmund (loan)	27	(1)
2022–2023	→ Girona (loan)	18	(2)
2023–2024	→ Frosinone (loan)	22	(2)
2024–2025	→ Granada (loan)	24	(1)
2025–	Atlético Mineiro	37	(4)

International career^{‡}
2017	Brazil U15	2	(2)
2018–2019	Brazil U17	10	(5)
2020–2021	Brazil U23	16	(3)
Medal record
Men's football
Representing Brazil
Olympic Games
Gold medal – first place	2020 Tokyo	Team
- * Club domestic league appearances and goals as of 21 July 2026 ‡ National team caps and goals as of 7 August 2021

Reinier Jesus Carvalho (born 19 January 2002), known as Reinier or Reinier Jesus, is a Brazilian professional footballer who plays as an attacking midfielder for Campeonato Brasileiro Série A club Atlético Mineiro.

== Club career ==
=== Early career ===
Born in Brasília, he is the son of former futsal player Mauro Brasília. Reinier joined the youth academy of Vasco da Gama in 2011 and moved to the Botafogo and Fluminense academies before joining Flamengo.

=== Flamengo ===
Reinier made his senior team debut for Flamengo on 31 July 2019 in the second leg of Flamengo's Copa Libertadores tie against Emelec at Maracanã Stadium. Flamengo won 2–0 and advanced in the competition on penalty shootouts. He made his league debut against Bahia the following weekend on 4 August.

On 9 November 2019, Reinier extended his contract with Flamengo until 31 October 2024 with a release clause set at €35 million.

=== Real Madrid ===
On 20 January 2020, La Liga club Real Madrid announced that the club reached an agreement with Flamengo for the transfer of Reinier, who signed a contract until June 2026. He was assigned to their reserves for the rest of the season. The fee was around €30 million. On 7 March 2020, he scored his first goal for the Castilla against Coruxo.

==== Loan to Borussia Dortmund ====
On 19 August 2020, Real Madrid announced that Reinier would be loaned to Borussia Dortmund until 30 June 2022. On 27 February 2021, he scored his first goal for Borussia Dortmund in a 3–0 home win against Arminia Bielefeld.

==== Loan to Girona ====
In August 2022, Reinier was loaned to Girona on a season-long deal. On 7 September 2022, he scored his first La Liga goal against Real Valladolid.

==== Loan to Frosinone ====
On 1 September 2023, Reinier agreed on a loan deal to newly-promoted Italian Serie A club Frosinone until the end of the 2023–24 season. He finished the season with 22 appearances and 2 goals in the Serie A as well as one game and one goal in the Coppa Italia. Following Frosinone's relegation to the Serie B on the last matchday, Reinier once again returned to Madrid.

==== Loan to Granada ====
On 30 August 2024, Reinier was loaned out to second division club Granada, who had just been relegated the previous season, on a season-long deal.

=== Atlético Mineiro ===
On 8 August 2025, Reinier joined Atlético Mineiro on a free transfer, agreeing to a contract running until December 2029.

== International career ==
Reinier was called to the 2017 South American U-15 Championship to represent Brazil. He started against Ecuador and Venezuela, scoring in both matches.

On 7 March 2018, Brazil U17 manager Paulo Victor Gomes called up Reinier for the Montaigu Tournament in France. He captained Brazil for the 2019 South American U-17 Championship in Peru and started all four group stage matches, scoring three goals.

On 2 July 2021, Reinier was named in the Brazil squad for the 2020 Summer Olympics.

== Career statistics ==
=== Club ===
As of match played 21 July 2026

Appearances and goals by club, season and competition
Club	Season	League			State league (Note: Includes Campeonato Mineiro)		National cup (Note: Includes DFB-Pokal, Coppa Italia, Copa del Rey, Copa do Brasil)		Continental		Other		Total	
Club	Season	Division	Apps	Goals	Apps	Goals	Apps	Goals	Apps	Goals	Apps	Goals	Apps	Goals
Flamengo	2019	Série A	14	6	0	0	0	0	1 (Note: Appearance in Copa Libertadores)	0	0	0	15	6
Real Madrid B	2019–20	Segunda División B	3	2	—		—		—		—		3	2
Borussia Dortmund (loan)	2020–21	Bundesliga	14	1	—		2	0	2 (Note: Appearances in UEFA Champions League)	0	1 (Note: Appearance in DFL-Supercup)	0	19	1
Borussia Dortmund (loan)	2021–22	Bundesliga	13	0	—		1	0	5 (Note: Three appearances in UEFA Champions League, two appearances in UEFA Europa League)	0	1	0	20	0
Borussia Dortmund (loan)	Total		27	1	—		3	0	7	0	2	0	39	1
Girona (loan)	2022–23	La Liga	18	2	—		0	0	—		—		18	2
Frosinone (loan)	2023–24	Serie A	22	2	—		1	1	—		—		23	3
Granada (loan)	2024–25	Segunda División	24	1	—		1	0	—		—		25	1
Atlético Mineiro	2025	Série A	13	0	—		2	0	5 (Note: Appearances in Copa Sudamericana)	0	—		20	0
Atlético Mineiro	2026	Série A	15	1	9	3	1	0	4	0	—		29	4
Atlético Mineiro	Total		28	1	9	3	3	0	9	0	—		49	4
Career total			136	15	9	3	8	1	17	0	2	0	172	19

== Honours ==
=== Club ===
Flamengo

- Campeonato Brasileiro Série A: 2019
- Copa Libertadores: 2019
- FIFA Club World Cup runner-up: 2019

Borussia Dortmund

- DFB-Pokal: 2020–21

=== International ===
Brazil U23

- Summer Olympics: 2020
