= Bourama Dembelé =

Malian footballer

Personal information
- Date of birth: 25 April 2008 (age 18)
- Place of birth: Mali
- Height: 1.95 m (6 ft 5 in)
- Position: Centre-back

Team information
- Current team: Granada
- Number: 35

Youth career
- Sevilla
- Cartaya
- Nuevo Molino
- 2024–2026: Granada

Senior career*
Years	Team	Apps	(Gls)
2025–	Granada B	24	(1)
2026–	Granada	2	(0)
- * Club domestic league appearances and goals as of 24 August 2026

Bourama Dembelé (born 25 April 2008) is a Malian professional footballer who plays as a centre-back for Segunda División club Granada.

== Career ==
Born in Mali, Dembelé moved to Cartaya, Huelva, Andalusia with months of age, and represented Sevilla FC, AD Cartaya and CDC Nuevo Molino as a youth before agreeing to join Granada CF in March 2024. He made his senior debut with the latter's reserves on 7 September 2025, starting in a 1–1 Tercera Federación home draw against Martos CD.

On 11 December 2025, already established as a regular member of the B-team, Dembelé renewed his contract with the Nazaríes until 2028. He spent the 2026 pre-season with the first team, being regularly used by manager Pacheta, and made his professional debut on 15 August of that year, starting in a 0–0 away draw against Real Oviedo.

On 25 August 2026, Dembelé further extended his link with Granada until 2030.
