= Siren Diao =

Spanish footballer (born 2005)

Personal information
- Full name: Siren Diao Balde
- Date of birth: 21 January 2005 (age 21)
- Place of birth: Figueres, Spain
- Height: 1.89 m (6 ft 2 in)
- Position: Striker

Team information
- Current team: Atalanta U23
- Number: 29

Youth career
- Esplais
- FE Figueres
- Girona
- L'Escala
- –2022: Costa Brava
- 2022–2024: Hellas Verona

Senior career*
Years	Team	Apps	(Gls)
2024–	Atalanta U23	18	(4)
2024–	Atalanta	0	(0)
2024–2025	→ Granada (loan)	11	(2)
2025–2026	→ Cesena (loan)	15	(0)
2026	→ Mirandés (loan)	7	(0)

International career^{‡}
2023–2024	Spain U19	6	(3)
- * Club domestic league appearances and goals as of 30 August 2026 ‡ National team caps and goals as of 13:21, 26 March 2024 (UTC)

Siren Diao Balde (born 21 January 2005) is a Spanish footballer who plays as a striker for Serie C Group C club Atalanta U23.

== Early life ==
Born in Figueres, Girona, Catalonia, Diao moved to neighbouring Castelló d'Empúries at the age of eight months and was raised in the city. He is of Senegalese descent.

== Club career ==
=== Early career ===
Diao started playing football at the age of five. He represented Esplais CF, FE Figueres, Girona FC, FC L'Escala and UE Costa Brava before moving to Italy with Hellas Verona FC in 2022.

=== Atalanta ===
On 4 January 2024, Atalanta BC announced the signing of Diao, and assigned him to the under-23 team in the Serie C. He made his senior debut nine days later, coming on as a late substitute for Giuseppe Di Serio in a 1–0 home win over Trento, and scored his first goal on 4 February by netting the opener in a 1–1 away draw against FC Pro Vercelli 1892.

Diao was also included in the matchday squad for several senior team games in early 2024, but remained on the bench in all of them.

==== Loan to Granada ====
On 15 August 2024, Diao returned to his home country after agreeing to a one-year loan deal with Granada CF in the Segunda División.

==== Loan to Cesena ====
On 6 August 2025, Diao was loaned by Cesena in Serie B.

==== Loan to Mirandés ====
On 2 February 2026, Diao moved on loan to Mirandés in the Segunda División.

== International career ==
On 3 November 2023, Diao was called up to the Spain national under-19 team, and made his debut for the side twelve days later in a 5–0 win over Moldova.

== Career statistics ==
=== Club ===
As of match played 21 December 2024

Appearances and goals by club, season and competition
Club	Season	League			National Cup (Note: Includes Coppa Italia, Copa del Rey)		Continental		Other		Total	
Club	Season	Division	Apps	Goals	Apps	Goals	Apps	Goals	Apps	Goals	Apps	Goals
Hellas Verona	2023-24	Serie A	0	0	0	0	—		—		0	0
Atalanta U23	2023-24	Serie C	16	4	—		—		3 (Note: Appearance(s) in Serie C Promotion play-offs)	1	19	5
Atalanta	2023-24	Serie A	0	0	0	0	0	0	—		0	0
Granada (loan)	2024-25	Segunda División	9	2	2	0	—		—		11	2
Career total			25	6	2	0	0	0	3	1	30	7
