= Íker García =

Spanish footballer

Personal information
- Full name: Íker García Chico
- Date of birth: 2 April 2006 (age 20)
- Place of birth: Carcaixent, Spain
- Position: Goalkeeper

Team information
- Current team: Granada B
- Number: 13

Youth career
- 2013–2019: Valencia
- 2019–2024: Alzira
- 2024–2025: Granada

Senior career*
Years	Team	Apps	(Gls)
2024–	Granada B	15	(0)
2025–	Granada	1	(0)
- * Club domestic league appearances and goals as of 9 June 2026

Íker García Chico (born 2 April 2006) is a Spanish professional footballer who plays as a goalkeeper for Recreativo Granada.

== Career ==
Born Carcaixent, Valencian Community, García joined Valencia CF's youth sides in 2013, aged seven. He moved to UD Alzira in 2019, and progressed through the youth sides before signing for Granada CF's Juvenil A side on 5 June 2024.

García made his senior debut with the reserves on 12 October 2024, starting in a 2–0 Segunda Federación home loss to CD Minera. The following 24 July, he renewed his contract with the club, being definitely promoted to the B-side now in Tercera Federación.

García made his first team debut with the Nazaríes on 10 October 2025, starting in a 0–0 Segunda División home draw against UD Las Palmas, as both goalkeepers Luca Zidane and Ander Astralaga were on international duty.
