= CD Huétor Vega =

Association football club in Spain

Huétor Vega
- Full name: Club Deportivo Huétor Vega
- Founded: 1927
- Ground: Las Viñas; Huétor Vega, Spain
- Capacity: 1,800
- Chairman: Félix Márquez
- Manager: Joseba Aguado
- League: Tercera Federación – Group 9
- 2025–26: Tercera Federación – Group 9, 10th of 18
- Website: https://cdhuetorvega1.wixsite.com/cdhuetorvega
Home colours

Club Deportivo Huétor Vega is a Spanish football team located in Huétor Vega, in the autonomous community of Andalusia. Founded in 1927 it currently plays in Tercera Federación – Group 9, holding home matches at Estadio Municipal Las Viñas, with a capacity of 1,800 spectators.

== History ==
CD Huétor Vega was founded in 1927. On 28 June 2018 the club signed an affiliation agreement with Granada CF. Following June it was prolonged for one more year. On 17 April 2020 it was informed that Huétor Vega would not renew the agreement, which ended on 30 June 2020.

== Season to season ==
Season	Tier	Division	Place	Copa del Rey
1982–83	7	2ª Reg.	3rd	
1983–84	7	2ª Reg.	8th	
1984–85	7	2ª Reg.	2nd	
1985–86	6	1ª Reg.	9th	
1986–87	6	1ª Reg.	3rd	
1987–88	5	Reg. Pref.	17th	
1988–89	6	1ª Reg.	5th	
1989–90	6	1ª Reg.	10th	
1990–91	6	1ª Reg.	6th	
1991–92	6	1ª Reg.	2nd	
1992–93	5	Reg. Pref.	13th	
1993–94	5	Reg. Pref.	13th	
1994–95	6	1ª Reg.	3rd	
1995–96	5	Reg. Pref.	11th	
1996–97	5	Reg. Pref.	10th	
1997–98	5	Reg. Pref.	15th	
1998–99	6	1ª Reg.	4th	
1999–2000	5	Reg. Pref.	16th	
2000–01	6	1ª Prov.	14th	
2001–02	6	1ª Prov.	10th	

Season	Tier	Division	Place	Copa del Rey
2002–03	6	1ª Prov.	7th	
2003–04	6	1ª Prov.	6th	
2004–05	6	Reg. Pref.	10th	
2005–06	6	Reg. Pref.	16th	
2006–07	7	1ª Prov.	5th	
2007–08	7	1ª Prov.	1st	
2008–09	6	Reg. Pref.	1st	
2009–10	5	1ª And.	13th	
2010–11	5	1ª And.	15th	
2011–12	6	Reg. Pref.	10th	
2012–13	6	Reg. Pref.	3rd	
2013–14	5	1ª And.	4th	
2014–15	5	1ª And.	4th	
2015–16	5	1ª And.	2nd	
2016–17	4	3ª	16th	
2017–18	4	3ª	18th	
2018–19	4	3ª	12th	N/A (Note: Second reserve team of Granada.)
2019–20	4	3ª	17th	N/A
2020–21	4	3ª	6th / 6th	
2021–22	5	3ª RFEF	11th	

Season	Tier	Division	Place	Copa del Rey
2022–23	5	3ª Fed.	6th	
2023–24	5	3ª Fed.	9th	
2024–25	5	3ª Fed.	6th	
2025–26	5	3ª Fed.	10th	
2026–27	5	3ª Fed.		

- 5 seasons in Tercera División
- 6 seasons in Tercera Federación/Tercera División RFEF
