= Angelo García (footballer) =

Spanish footballer

Personal information
- Full name: Angelo García Hidalgo
- Date of birth: 27 January 2006 (age 20)
- Place of birth: Estepona, Spain
- Position: Left-back

Team information
- Current team: Granada
- Number: 33

Youth career
- 2018–2020: Málaga
- 2020–2022: Estepona
- 2022–2025: Granada

Senior career*
Years	Team	Apps	(Gls)
2023	Granada C	3	(0)
2025–	Granada B	38	(2)
2026–	Granada	4	(0)
- * Club domestic league appearances and goals as of 4 October 2026

Angelo García Hidalgo (born 27 January 2006), sometimes known as just Angelo, is a Spanish professional footballer who plays as a left-back for Granada CF.

== Career ==
Born Estepona, Málaga, Andalusia, Angelo joined Granada CF's youth sides in 2022, after representing CD Estepona FS and Málaga CF. He made his senior debut with the C-team on 24 September 2023, in a 5–0 Tercera Andaluza home routing of CD Base Gabia CF B.

After another two appearances with the C's, Angelo subsequently played for the Juvenil team before making his debut with the reserves in January 2025. He made his professional debut on 12 September 2026, coming on as a second-half substitute for Diego Pampín in a 1–1 Segunda División home draw against Albacete Balompié.
