= Samu Cortés =

Spanish footballer

Personal information
- Full name: Samuel Cruz Cortés Cortés
- Date of birth: 9 January 2006 (age 20)
- Place of birth: Granada, Spain
- Position: Winger

Team information
- Current team: Recreativo (on loan from Granada)

Youth career
- 2019–2020: Ciudad Granada
- 2020–2024: Granada
- 2023–2024: → Alhendín (loan)

Senior career*
Years	Team	Apps	(Gls)
2024–2026	Granada B	59	(8)
2025–	Granada	4	(0)
2026–	→ Recreativo (loan)	0	(0)
- * Club domestic league appearances and goals as of 9 June 2026

Samuel Cruz "Samu" Cortés Cortés (born 9 January 2006) is a Spanish professional footballer who plays mainly as a right winger for Recreativo de Huelva, on loan from Granada CF.

== Career ==
Born Granada, Andalusia, Cortés joined Granada CF's youth sides in 2020 from CD Ciudad de Granada, but spent the 2023–24 campaign on loan at CF Alhendín Balompié. Back to the Nazaríes, he was assigned to the reserves in Segunda Federación, and made his senior debut on 31 August 2024, coming on as a second-half substitute and scoring his side's only goal in a 2–1 away loss to Linares Deportivo.

Cortés quickly established himself as a regular starter for the B's, and agreed to a contract extension on 2 January 2025. He made his first team debut eight days later, replacing Giorgi Tsitaishvili late into a 0–0 Segunda División home draw against Burgos CF.

On 28 July 2026, Cortés was loaned to fourth division side Recreativo de Huelva, for one year.
