= Loïc Williams =

Spanish footballer (born 2002)

Personal information
- Full name: Loïc Williams Ntambue Kayumba Gironés
- Date of birth: 7 January 2002 (age 24)
- Place of birth: Valencia, Spain
- Height: 1.88 m (6 ft 2 in)
- Position: Centre back

Team information
- Current team: Colorado Rapids
- Number: 5

Youth career
- 2013–2017: Levante
- 2017–2019: Patacona
- 2019–2020: Valencia
- 2020–2021: Girona

Senior career*
Years	Team	Apps	(Gls)
2021–2022	Girona B	13	(0)
2022–2023	Atlético Paso	23	(0)
2023–2024	Tenerife	21	(0)
2024–2026	Granada	66	(1)
2026–	Colorado Rapids	1	(1)
- * Club domestic league appearances and goals as of 9 June 2026

Loïc Williams Ntambue Kayumba Gironés (born 7 January 2002) is a Spanish footballer who plays as a central defender for Major League Soccer club Colorado Rapids.

== Career ==
=== Early career ===
Born in Valencia to a Rwandan father and a Spanish mother, Williams represented Levante UD, Patacona CF, Valencia CF and Girona FC as a youth. Promoted to the latter's reserves in Tercera División RFEF in July 2021, he made his senior debut on 5 September of that year, coming on as a late substitute in a 2–1 away win over CE L'Hospitalet.

On 28 July 2022, Williams moved to Segunda Federación newcomers CD Atlético Paso. He featured regularly for the side as they narrowly avoided relegation.

=== Tenerife ===
Williams joined CD Tenerife on 27 June 2023, being initially assigned to the B-team in the fifth division but making the pre-season with the main squad. He made his first team debut on 21 August, replacing Sergio González late into a 2–0 Segunda División away win over SD Huesca.

=== Granada ===
On 31 July 2024, Williams moved to fellow second division side Granada CF on a four-year contract. A regular starter for the side, he scored his first professional goal on 15 September, netting his team's second in a 2–2 away draw against Elche CF.

=== Colorado Rapids ===
On 25 March 2026, Major League Soccer side Colorado Rapids announced the signing of Williams on a four-year deal, effective as of 1 July, with an option for another year.
