= Juanjo Flores =

Spanish footballer

Personal information
- Full name: Juan José Flores Castro
- Date of birth: 28 January 2007 (age 19)
- Place of birth: Lora del Río, Spain
- Height: 1.88 m (6 ft 2 in)
- Position: Centre-back

Team information
- Current team: Granada
- Number: 30

Youth career
- Lora
- 2015–2021: Betis
- 2021–2022: Nervión
- 2022–2023: Utrera
- 2023–2024: San Roque Balompié
- 2024–2025: Granada

Senior career*
Years	Team	Apps	(Gls)
2025–	Granada B	21	(1)
2025–	Granada	7	(0)
- * Club domestic league appearances and goals as of 4 October 2026

Juan José "Juanjo" Flores Castro (born 28 January 2007) is a Spanish professional footballer who plays as a centre-back for Granada CF.

== Career ==
Born Lora del Río, Seville, Andalusia, Flores played for seven seasons in the youth sides of Real Betis, before leaving for CD Utrera in 2022. He moved to San Roque Balompié in the following year, before signing for Granada CF's Juvenil side in January 2024.

After making his senior debut with the reserves in Tercera Federación, Flores made his first team debut on 28 October 2025, coming on as a second-half substitute for goalscorer Jorge Pascual in a 5–1 away routing of CD Roda, for the season's Copa del Rey. On 14 November, he renewed his contract until 2028.

Flores made his professional debut on 6 January 2026, starting and scoring an own goal in a 3–1 home loss to Rayo Vallecano, also for the national cup.
