= Pedro Alemañ =

Spanish footballer

Personal information
- Full name: Pedro Alemañ Serna
- Date of birth: 21 March 2002 (age 24)
- Place of birth: Elche, Spain
- Height: 1.82 m (6 ft 0 in)
- Position: Midfielder

Team information
- Current team: Granada
- Number: 8

Youth career
- 2012–2013: Celtic Elche
- 2013–2016: Elche
- 2016–2020: Valencia

Senior career*
Years	Team	Apps	(Gls)
2020–2022	Valencia B	56	(0)
2022–2023	Jong Sparta	4	(1)
2022–2024	Sparta Rotterdam	5	(0)
2024–2025	Valencia B	37	(4)
2025–	Granada	36	(6)
- * Club domestic league appearances and goals as of 9 June 2026

Pedro Alemañ Serna (born 21 March 2002) is a Spanish professional footballer who plays as a midfielder for Granada CF.

== Career ==
Born in Elche, Alicante, Valencian Community, Alemañ represented hometown sides CF Celtic Elche and Elche CF before joining the youth sides of Valencia CF in 2016. In July 2020, he signed his first professional contract with the club, and started training with the senior team in pre-season.

Alemañ made his senior debut with the reserves on 17 October 2020, coming on as a late substitute for Pablo Gozálbez in a 2–2 Segunda División B away draw against Atzeneta UE. On 30 December 2022, he moved to the Dutch club Sparta Rotterdam in the Eredivisie with a contract until 2025.

After featuring with Jong Sparta in the Eerste Divisie, Alemañ made his professional debut with Sparta as a late substitute in a 4–0 Eredivisie loss to Ajax on 19 February 2023. On 11 January 2024, after being rarely used by the club, he returned to Valencia and their B-team.

On 22 June 2025, Alemañ signed a three-year contract with Granada CF in Segunda División.

== International career ==
Alemañ was called up to a training camp with the Spain U18s.

== Playing style ==
Alemañ is a left-footed midfielder who plays as an 8. He changes pace, reads the game well, playmakes and makes a lot of assists. He is very technical with his left foot, and has the fitness to play many matches.

== Personal life ==
Outside of football, Alemañ has a degree in mechanical engineering from the "Colegio de Mas Camarena".
