= Dylan Rodríguez (footballer) =

Spanish footballer

Personal information
- Full name: Dylan Rodríguez Vellisca
- Date of birth: 23 July 2007 (age 19)
- Place of birth: Palencia, Spain
- Position: Midfielder

Team information
- Current team: Granada
- Number: 32

Youth career
- 2022–2023: San Juanillo
- 2023–2024: CIA
- 2024–2025: La Cruz Villanovense
- 2025–2026: Granada

Senior career*
Years	Team	Apps	(Gls)
2026–	Granada	1	(0)
- * Club domestic league appearances and goals as of 6 September 2026

Dylan Rodríguez Vellisca (born 23 July 2007) is a Spanish professional footballer who plays as a midfielder for Granada CF.

== Career ==
Born in Palencia, Castile and León, Rodríguez joined Granada CF's youth sides in 2025, from UD La Cruz Villanovense. On 17 April 2026, he renewed his contract with the club until 2028, being promoted to the reserves ahead of the following campaign.

On 6 September 2026, before even having appeared for the B-side, Rodríguez made his professional debut by coming on as a second-half substitute for Gerard Gumbau in a 3–0 Segunda División away loss to SD Eibar.
