= Jiang Lizhang =

Chinese businessperson (born 1981)

- 蒋立章
- Born: 27 October 1981
- Occupation: businessman
- Known for: owner of Granada CF

Jiang Lizhang (Chinese: 蒋立章; born October 27, 1981, in Fu'an) is a Chinese businessman who owns Granada CF in Spain's Segunda División, having bought a controlling stake for over €37m. He was also a part-owner of the NBA's Minnesota Timberwolves, having bought 5% of the franchise for around €45m in 2016, before Minnesota Timberwolves owner Glen Taylor bought back the 5% of the team's stake from Jiang in February 2019. He founded Desports in 2004 and sold the sports marketing company in 2015, while staying in an executive position. In January 2017, he bought 90% of Chongqing Dangdai Lifan F.C. He bought 60% of Parma Calcio 1913, having bought his stake in June 2017, but sold that entire stake to the Krause Group in 2020. He is also the investor of Portuguese football club Tondela.
