= Manu Lama =

Spanish footballer

Personal information
- Full name: Manuel Lama Maroto
- Date of birth: 12 February 2001 (age 25)
- Place of birth: Madrid, Spain
- Height: 1.92 m (6 ft 4 in)
- Position: Centre-back

Team information
- Current team: Granada
- Number: 5

Youth career
- Atlético Madrid

Senior career*
Years	Team	Apps	(Gls)
2020–2023	Atlético Madrid B	21	(0)
2020–2021	→ La Nucía (loan)	12	(0)
2023–2024	Fuenlabrada	40	(4)
2024–	Granada	50	(5)
- * Club domestic league appearances and goals as of 9 June 2026

Manuel "Manu" Lama Maroto (born 12 February 2001) is a Spanish footballer who plays as a centre-back for Granada CF.

== Career ==
Born in Madrid, Lama was a youth product of Atlético Madrid. On 8 September 2020, after finishing his formation, he was loaned out to Segunda División B side CF La Nucía for the season, and made his senior debut on 18 October by starting in a 0–0 home draw against Orihuela CF.

Upon returning to Atleti in July 2021, Lama was assigned to the reserves in Tercera División RFEF, before being an unused substitute for the first team in a Copa del Rey match against Real Sociedad and in a La Liga match against Levante UD. On 25 May 2022, he renewed his contract with the club until 2024.

On 27 January 2023, after being rarely used for the B-side now in Segunda Federación, Lama signed a two-and-a-half-year deal with Primera Federación side CF Fuenlabrada. He became an undisputed starter during the 2023–24 season, scoring four goals in 36 appearances as his side narrowly avoided relegation.

On 11 August 2024, Lama agreed to a three-year contract with Granada CF in Segunda División. He only made his professional debut the following 26 January, replacing Pablo Insua and scoring his side's third in a 3–1 home win over Sporting de Gijón.

== Personal life ==
Lama is the son of Spanish sportscaster Manolo Lama.
