= Sergio Rodelas =

Spanish footballer

Personal information
- Full name: Sergio Rodelas Pintor
- Date of birth: 1 December 2004 (age 21)
- Place of birth: Alhendín, Spain
- Height: 1.68 m (5 ft 6 in)
- Position: Winger

Team information
- Current team: Granada
- Number: 26

Youth career
- Zaidín 90
- 2012–2023: Granada

Senior career*
| Years | Team | Apps | (Gls) |
| 2023 | Cubillas de Albolote | 2 | (0) |
| 2023–2025 | Granada B | 43 | (4) |
| 2024– | Granada | 47 | (1) |

International career^{‡}
| 2025– | Spain U21 | 2 | (0) |
- * Club domestic league appearances and goals as of 9 June 2026 ‡ National team caps and goals as of 14 October 2025

Sergio Rodelas Pintor (born 1 December 2004) is a Spanish professional footballer who plays mainly as a left winger for Granada CF.

== Career ==
Born in Alhendín, Granada, Andalusia, Rodelas joined Granada CF's youth sides in 2012, aged eight, from CD Zaidín 90. He made his senior debut with the reserves on 29 January 2023, coming on as a late substitute but being sent off in a 2–0 Segunda Federación home win over Cádiz CF Mirandilla.

On 24 July 2023, after featuring with the farm team FC Cubillas in the División de Honor Andaluza and helping the B-side in their promotion to Primera Federación, Rodelas renewed his contract with Granada. He scored his first senior goal the following 17 March, netting the B's third in a 4–3 away loss to UD Melilla.

Rodelas made his first team – and La Liga – debut on 15 May 2024, replacing fellow youth graduate Raúl Torrente in a 2–1 away loss to Rayo Vallecano, as his side was already relegated; he also assisted Lucas Boyé's goal. He scored his first professional goal on 17 December, netting his side's third in a 4–1 Segunda División home routing of FC Cartagena.

== Career statistics ==
As of match played 24 May 2024

Appearances and goals by club, season and competition
| Club | Season | League | | | Cup | | Continental | | Other | | Total | |
| Club | Season | Division | Apps | Goals | Apps | Goals | Apps | Goals | Apps | Goals | Apps | Goals |
|---|---|---|---|---|---|---|---|---|---|---|---|---|
| Cubillas de Albolote | 2022–23 | División de Honor | 2 | 0 | — | | — | | — | | 2 | 0 |
| Granada B | 2022–23 | Segunda Federación | 6 | 0 | — | | — | | — | | 6 | 0 |
| Granada B | 2023–24 | Primera Federación | 30 | 2 | — | | — | | — | | 30 | 2 |
| Granada B | Total | | 36 | 2 | — | | — | | — | | 36 | 2 |
| Granada | 2023–24 | La Liga | 3 | 0 | — | | — | | — | | 3 | 0 |
| Career total | | | 41 | 2 | 0 | 0 | 0 | 0 | 0 | 0 | 41 | 2 |

== Personal life ==
Rodelas' older brother Javier is also a footballer and a winger. He too was groomed at Granada.
