= Recreativo Granada =

Spanish football club

Coordinates: 37.208856°N 3.598192°W

- Full name: Club Recreativo Granada
- Nicknames: El B Recreativo
- Founded: 10 July 1947; 79 years ago
- Ground: Ciudad Deportiva del Granada CF; Granada, Andalusia, Spain
- Capacity: 500
- President: Jiang Lizhang
- Head coach: Sergio Ortiz
- League: Tercera Federación – Group 9
- 2025–26: Tercera Federación – Group 9, 11th of 18
| Home colours | Away colours | Third colours |

Club Recreativo Granada is a Spanish football team based in Granada, in the autonomous community of Andalusia. Founded in 1947, it is the reserve team of Granada CF and currently plays in Tercera Federación – Group 9, holding home games at Estadio Miguel Prieto, with a capacity for 2,500 spectators.

Unlike the English League, reserve teams in Spain play in the same football pyramid as their senior team, rather than a separate league. However, reserve teams cannot play in the same division as the main squad.

Reserve teams are also no longer permitted to enter the Copa del Rey. Additionally, only under-23 players or under-25 players with a professional contract can switch between senior and reserve teams.

== History ==
Founded in 1947 as Recreativo de Granada, the team achieved a host of promotions and went on to feature several seasons in Tercera División.

On 30 June 2013, Granada B finally achieved his first promotion to Segunda División B, after a 1–2 defeat against Extremadura UD. The club had a good first season in the new category by finishing 6th among 20 teams. On 9 March 2018, Granada announced that the reserve team will carry the name of Club Recreativo Granada from 1 July.

In the 2018-19 season the club managed to save its position in the Segunda División B, having finished in the 14th position.

== Season to season ==
- As an independent club

| Season | Tier | Division | Place | Copa del Rey |
|---|---|---|---|---|
| 1947–48 | 4 | 1ª Reg. | | |
| 1948–49 | 4 | 1ª Reg. | | |
| 1949–50 | 4 | 1ª Reg. | | |
| 1950–51 | 3 | 3ª | 13th | |
| 1951–52 | 3 | 3ª | 11th | |
| 1952–53 | 3 | 3ª | 7th | |
| 1953–54 | 3 | 3ª | 9th | |
| 1954–55 | 3 | 3ª | 8th | |
| 1955–56 | 3 | 3ª | 8th | |
| 1956–57 | 3 | 3ª | 4th | |
| 1957–58 | 3 | 3ª | 11th | |
| 1958–59 | 3 | 3ª | 11th | |
| 1959–60 | 3 | 3ª | 11th | |
| 1960–61 | 3 | 3ª | 11th | |
| 1961–62 | 3 | 3ª | 15th | |
| 1962–63 | 3 | 3ª | 6th | |
| 1963–64 | 3 | 3ª | 9th | |
| 1964–65 | 3 | 3ª | 7th | |
| 1965–66 | 3 | 3ª | 9th | |
| 1966–67 | 3 | 3ª | 11th | |

| Season | Tier | Division | Place | Copa del Rey |
|---|---|---|---|---|
| 1967–68 | 3 | 3ª | 12th | |
| 1968–69 | 4 | 1ª Reg. | 1st | |
| 1969–70 | 3 | 3ª | 6th | |
| 1970–71 | 3 | 3ª | 19th | |
| 1971–72 | 4 | 1ª Reg. | 15th | |
| 1972–73 | 4 | 1ª Reg. | 5th | |
| 1973–74 | 4 | 1ª Reg. | 15th | |
| 1974–75 | 4 | 1ª Reg. | 9th | |
| 1975–76 | 4 | Reg. Pref. | 13th | |
| 1976–77 | 4 | Reg. Pref. | 11th | |
| 1977–78 | 5 | Reg. Pref. | 19th | |
| 1978–79 | 6 | 1ª Reg. | 1st | |
| 1979–80 | 5 | Reg. Pref. | 19th | |
| 1980–81 | 4 | 3ª | 18th | |
| 1981–82 | 4 | 3ª | 20th | |
| 1982–83 | 5 | Reg. Pref. | 9th | |
| 1983–84 | 5 | Reg. Pref. | 5th | |
| 1984–85 | 5 | Reg. Pref. | 6th | |
| 1985–86 | 5 | Reg. Pref. | 17th | |
| 1986–87 | 5 | Reg. Pref. | 13th | |

| Season | Tier | Division | Place | Copa del Rey |
|---|---|---|---|---|
| 1987–88 | 5 | Reg. Pref. | 11th | |
| 1988–89 | 5 | Reg. Pref. | 1st | |
| 1989–90 | 5 | Reg. Pref. | 7th | |
| 1990–91 | 5 | Reg. Pref. | 1st | |
| 1991–92 | 4 | 3ª | 10th | |
| 1992–93 | 4 | 3ª | 18th | |
| 1993–94 | 4 | 3ª | 9th | |
| 1994–95 | 4 | 3ª | 20th | |
| 1995–96 | 4 | Reg. Pref. | 2nd | |
| 1996–97 | 4 | 3ª | 12th | |

- As the reserve team of Granada CF

| Season | Tier | Division | Place |
|---|---|---|---|
| 1997–98 | 4 | 3ª | 18th |
| 1998–99 | 5 | Reg. Pref. | 7th |
| 1999–2000 | 5 | Reg. Pref. | 7th |
| 2000–01 | 5 | Reg. Pref. | 7th |
| 2001–02 | 5 | Reg. Pref. | 15th |
| 2002–03 | 6 | 1ª Reg. | 3rd |
| 2003–04 | 5 | Reg. Pref. | 6th |
| 2004–05 | 5 | 1ª And. | 14th |
| 2005–06 | 6 | Reg. Pref. | 6th |
| 2006–07 | 6 | Reg. Pref. | 3rd |
| 2007–08 | 6 | Reg. Pref. | 3rd |
| 2008–09 | 5 | 1ª And. | 9th |
| 2009–10 | 5 | 1ª And. | 6th |
| 2010–11 | 5 | 1ª And. | 7th |
| 2011–12 | 5 | 1ª And. | 1st |
| 2012–13 | 4 | 3ª | 3rd |
| 2013–14 | 3 | 2ª B | 6th |
| 2014–15 | 3 | 2ª B | 5th |
| 2015–16 | 3 | 2ª B | 5th |
| 2016–17 | 3 | 2ª B | 8th |

| Season | Tier | Division | Place |
|---|---|---|---|
| 2017–18 | 3 | 2ª B | 8th |
| 2018–19 | 3 | 2ª B | 14th |
| 2019–20 | 3 | 2ª B | 18th |
| 2020–21 | 3 | 2ª B | 7th / 3rd |
| 2021–22 | 4 | 2ª RFEF | 8th |
| 2022–23 | 4 | 2ª Fed. | 3rd |
| 2023–24 | 3 | 1ª Fed. | 20th |
| 2024–25 | 4 | 2ª Fed. | 17th |
| 2025–26 | 5 | 3ª Fed. | 11th |
| 2026–27 | 5 | 3ª Fed. | |

- 1 season in Primera Federación
- 8 seasons in Segunda División B
- 3 seasons in Segunda Federación/Segunda División RFEF
- 29 seasons in Tercera División
- 2 seasons in Tercera Federación

== Current squad ==
As of 13 September 2026

Note: Flags indicate national team as defined under FIFA eligibility rules; some limited exceptions apply. Players may hold more than one non-FIFA nationality.

| No. | Pos. | Nation | Player |
|---|---|---|---|
| 1 | GK | UKR | Bogdan Isachenko |
| 2 | DF | ESP | Mauro Rodríguez |
| 3 | DF | ESP | Angelo García |
| 4 | DF | ESP | David Morilla |
| 5 | DF | MAR | Rayan Bouzidi |
| 6 | MF | GHA | Derrick Antwi |
| 7 | FW | ESP | Rafa Alete |
| 8 | MF | ESP | Manu Maza |
| 9 | FW | GHA | Enrique Bas |
| 10 | MF | ESP | Pablo Ferrández |
| 11 | FW | ESP | Eli Flores |
| 12 | DF | MLI | Bourama Dembelé |
| 13 | GK | ESP | Íker García |
| 14 | DF | ESP | Bruno Vasile |

| No. | Pos. | Nation | Player |
|---|---|---|---|
| 15 | MF | ESP | Mario Gambín |
| 16 | MF | GHA | Emmanuel Ofori |
| 18 | MF | GHA | Robin Boateng |
| 19 | FW | SEN | Cheikh Mbacke |
| 20 | DF | CMR | Fidel Mangwa |
| 21 | MF | ESP | Dylan Rodríguez |
| 22 | DF | ESP | Puma |
| 23 | DF | ESP | Diego Cosma |
| 24 | DF | ESP | Juanjo Flores |
| 26 | MF | ESP | Pablo Pérez |
| 28 | MF | ESP | Aitor Arnedo |
| 30 | MF | ESP | Dani Hidalgo |
| 31 | GK | ESP | Carlos Guirao |
| 35 | GK | ESP | Pablo González |

=== From Youth Academy ===
Note: Flags indicate national team as defined under FIFA eligibility rules; some limited exceptions apply. Players may hold more than one non-FIFA nationality.

| No. | Pos. | Nation | Player |
|---|---|---|---|
| 29 | FW | ESP | Javi Guerrero |

=== Current technical staff ===
| Position | Staff |
|---|---|
| Manager | (Spain) Germán Crespo |
| Assistant Manager | (Spain) Óscar Ibáñez |
| Goalkeeper Coach | (Spain) Rafael Avilés |
| Fitness coach | (Spain) Juan Carlos Jiménez |
| Physiotherapist | (Spain) José Miguel Funes (Spain) Isaac Campos (Spain) Jose Antonio Sánchez Huertas |
| Rehab fitness coach | (Spain) Gustavo Vallejo |
| Delegate | (Spain) Rafa Moraga |
| Match delegate | (Spain) Paco Morales |
| Kit man | (Spain) Paco Entrena |

Last updated: October 2022
Source: Granada CF Official Website
