= Granada CF =

Football club in Granada, Spain

Granada
- Full name: Granada Club de Fútbol
- Nicknames: Nazaríes (Nasrids); Los Rojiblancos (The Red and Whites)
- Short name: GCF
- Founded: 6 April 1931; 95 years ago as Club Recreativo Granada
- Stadium: Estadio Nuevo Los Cármenes
- Capacity: 21,600
- Owner: Daxian 2009 S.L.
- President: Sophia Yang
- Head coach: Pacheta
- League: Segunda División
- 2025–26: Segunda División, 14th of 22
- Website: granadacf.es
Home colours	Away colours	Third colours

Granada Club de Fútbol (Spanish pronunciation: [gɾaˈnaða ˈkluβ ðe ˈfuðβol]), known simply as Granada or "Graná", is a professional Spanish football club based in the city of Granada, in the autonomous community of Andalusia, that currently plays in Segunda División. Its main shareholder is the Chinese company Desport, and its president Jiang Lizhang. The club was founded in 1931 with the name of Club Recreativo Granada, and plays its home matches at the Nuevo Estadio de Los Cármenes.

Since 17 July 2020, the club is located at position 22 of the historical points classification of the First Division, and 20 of the historical First Division number of seasons classification, where it has participated in 25 seasons and finished in sixth place twice. Granada was the Copa del Rey runner-up in 1959 (the competition was then known as the Copa del Generalísimo). The club finished the 2019–20 season in 7th, qualifying for their first-ever European appearance, in the UEFA Europa League, where they were quarter-finalists.

== History ==
=== Foundation ===
Granada Club de Fútbol was founded on 6 April 1931, originally as Recreativo de Granada; the first president was Julio López Fernández. He registered the club in the Registry of Associations in the Civil Government and presented the first Board of Directors.

The first football match was played against the Deportivo Jaén on 6 December 1931, which resulted in a 2–1 victory. The first goal in the match, and in the club's history, was scored by Antonio Bombillar. The first home match was played against U.D. Andújar two weeks later. Granada won it 1–0. It took place at Campo de Las Tablas stadium. In the 1931–32 season, the club finished 2nd in the Tercera Regional – Región Sur championship. 4 wins in 6 matches helped Granada achieve promotion to the Segunda Regional. The club started the season in a new division with a new president, Gabriel Morcillo Raya. During the 1932–33 season the club had the biggest win in its history, 11–0 against Xerez on 23 April 1933.

=== La Liga entry and peak ===
After several promotions, in 1941–42 the club made its La Liga debut. It was the match against the Celta on 28 September 1941. The game ended up in 1–1 draw. The first Granada goal in the highest Spanish division was scored by César Rodríguez Álvarez. During that season the Granada had some historical home wins, among them 8–0 against Real Oviedo and 6–0 against Barcelona. Granada finished the season in the 10th position among 14 teams.

From 1942 until the 1980s, it alternated between the top flight and the Segunda División, with its golden age coming during the late 1960s and mid 70s, as the Andalusian club had eight consecutive top flight seasons between 1968–69 and 1975–76 and made the Copa del Rey semi and quarter-finals on 4 occasions. These seasons also included a best-ever sixth league places in the 1971–72 and 1973–74 seasons. Granada finished the 1971–72 season with 9 wins in the last 10 home games, with powerhouses Barcelona and Real Madrid being among those wins.

In 1959 Granada achieved its greatest landmark, being the runner-up of the Copa del Generalísimo (later Copa del Rey). In the final, played at the Santiago Bernabéu Stadium, the team lost to Barcelona 4–1. The only goal for Granada was scored by the Argentinian forward Ramón Carranza.

Chart of Granada CF league performance 1929–present

In the 1980s, Granada had some brief appearances in the second division. In 1983–84, they finished 8th among 20 teams in the Segunda División, just 10 points away from the champion the Real Madrid Castilla and the runner-up the Bilbao Athletic. In 1984–85, Granada finished 18th and were relegated to the Segunda División B; in the same season, the club was eliminated by fourth-tier club Estepona in the second round of the Copa del Rey. Although the club returned to the Segunda División after two years for the 1987–88 season, it was relegated again that same season after finishing 19th.

=== Decline and revival ===
Granada spent most of the following seasons in the Segunda División B, and were relegated to the fourth tier in 2002–03, due to failing to pay its players under the presidency of Francisco Jimena. After four seasons in the fourth division, former Real Madrid president Lorenzo Sanz, along with his son Paco, arrived at the club. With their help, the Andalusian side was again promoted to the third category but got itself into serious financial trouble. In the 2005–06 season Granada won Group 9 of the Tercera División and qualified for the promotional play-offs, where the first rival was Linense. After the two games ended up in 1–1 draws, Granada won in the penalty shootout. After that they had to face Guadalajara, winning 3–1 on aggregate, which gave them promotion to the third tier.

In 2006–07, Granada played in Group IV of the third level after four seasons in the Tercera. The president Paco Sanz, with the massive support of the fans, continued to lead the project with the intention of bringing the team to the top division, but the lack of time after the promotion led to hasty actions. In July 2009, the club was in such financial difficulty that it was on the brink of dissolving. The solution to the crisis came with the signing of a partnership agreement between Granada and Udinese Calcio, with the Spaniards incorporating large numbers of players contracted to the Italian club as well as receiving its youth players and reserves as part of the agreement. At the end of the season, Granada won its group and then got promoted by beating Alcorcón in the play-offs, returning to the second division after 22 years.

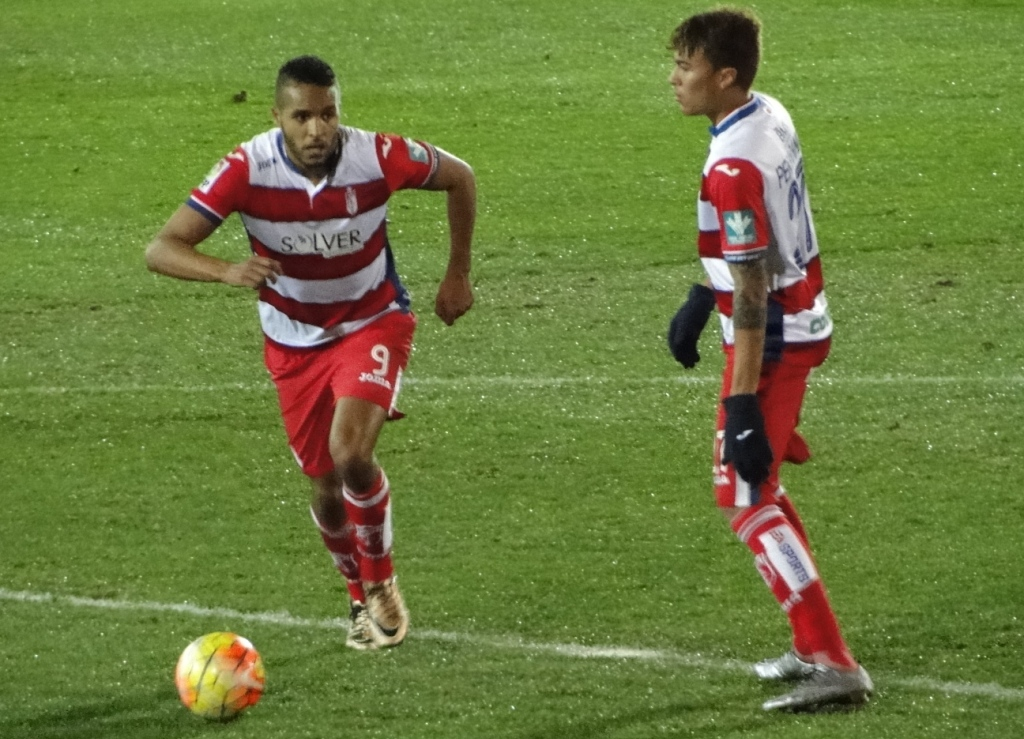
Granada's Youssef El-Arabi and Adalberto Peñaranda during a La Liga fixture versus SD Eibar in 2016

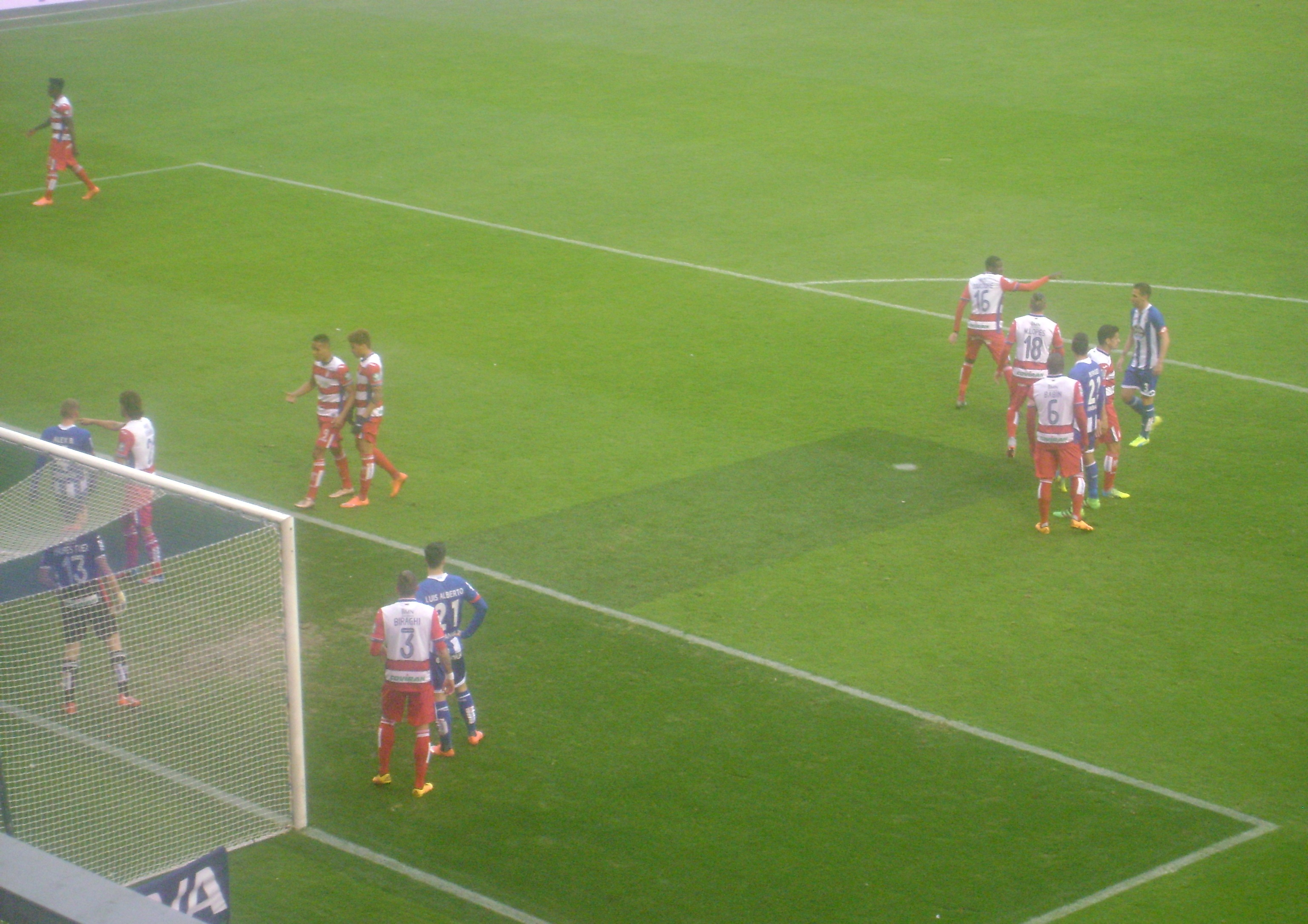
Deportivo de La Coruña vs. Granada.

In 2010–11, Granada finished in fifth position, with most of the players loaned by Udinese still on board. On 18 June 2011, the club became the first winner of the promotion play-offs – a different system was used from 1985 to 1999 – after successively defeating Celta de Vigo (1–1, penalty shootout) and Elche (1–1 on aggregate, away goals rule), thus returning to the top division after a 35-year absence.

In June 2016, Chinese businessman Jiang Lizhang became the new owner of the club, buying the Pozzo family's controlling stake. On 22 July 2016, Granada announced they had acquired Mexican goalkeeper Guillermo Ochoa on a season-long loan, and during the season, Ochoa would break the record for the most saves in a single La Liga season. After surviving in the top flight for six seasons, the team was relegated in 2016–17 after being defeated by Real Sociedad.

Under new manager Diego Martínez, Granada returned to the top flight as runners-up to CA Osasuna in the 2018–19 Segunda División. The following season, the team finished 7th in the top flight, earning qualification for the UEFA Europa League, the first time the club qualified for any European competition. It also reached the Copa del Rey semi-finals for the first time in 50 years, narrowly losing to Athletic Bilbao on away goals after a 2–2 aggregate draw. They reached the quarter-finals in Europe, being eliminated by Manchester United. On 22 May 2022, the team was relegated after a draw against Espanyol. In the 2022–23 season, Granada returned to La Liga, by sealing a 1st position in the table on the very last match day of the season. However, in 2023–24 season, Granada was relegated back to the second division after finishing in last place.

== Seasons ==
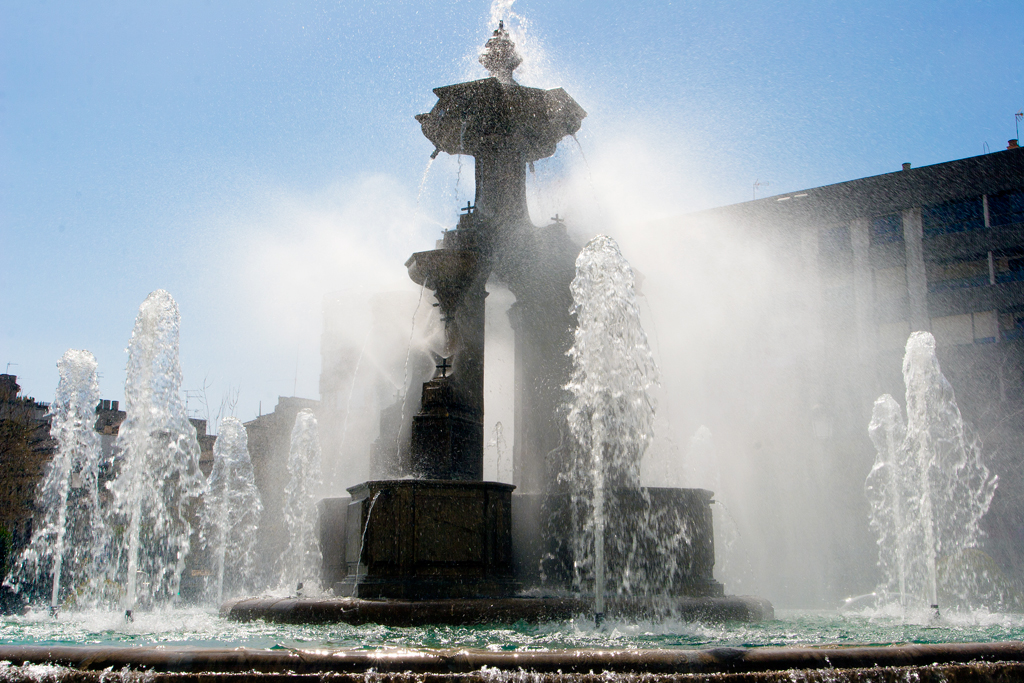
Fuente de las Batallas in Granada, meeting point of the fans for the celebrations

Season	Tier	Division	Place	Copa del Rey
1931–32	6	3ª Reg.	3rd	
1932–33	5	2ª Reg.	2nd	
1933–34	3	3ª	1st	
1934–35	2	2ª	7th	First round
1935–36	2	2ª	6th	First round
1939–40	2	2ª	2nd	
1940–41	2	2ª	1st	Round of 16
1941–42	1	1ª	10th	Quarter-finals
1942–43	1	1ª	12th	First round
1943–44	1	1ª	8th	Quarter-finals
1944–45	1	1ª	12th	Semi-finals
1945–46	2	2ª	4th	Quarter-finals
1946–47	2	2ª	7th	First round
1947–48	2	2ª	7th	Sixth round
1948–49	2	2ª	3rd	Quarter-finals
1949–50	2	2ª	9th	Second round
1950–51	2	2ª	7th	
1951–52	2	2ª	13th	
1952–53	2	2ª	9th	Round of 16
1953–54	2	2ª	4th	

Season	Tier	Division	Place	Copa del Rey
1954–55	2	2ª	3rd	
1955–56	2	2ª	8th	
1956–57	2	2ª	1st	
1957–58	1	1ª	13th	Round of 16
1958–59	1	1ª	13th	Runner-up
1959–60	1	1ª	12th	Round of 32
1960–61	1	1ª	16th	Round of 32
1961–62	2	2ª	3rd	Round of 32
1962–63	2	2ª	6th	Round of 32
1963–64	2	2ª	6th	First round
1964–65	2	2ª	7th	Round of 32
1965–66	2	2ª	2nd	First round
1966–67	1	1ª	14th	Quarter-finals
1967–68	2	2ª	1st	First round
1968–69	1	1ª	8th	Semi-finals
1969–70	1	1ª	12th	Round of 16
1970–71	1	1ª	10th	Round of 16
1971–72	1	1ª	6th	Round of 16
1972–73	1	1ª	13th	Quarter-finals
1973–74	1	1ª	6th	Quarter-finals

Season	Tier	Division	Place	Copa del Rey
1974–75	1	1ª	15th	Quarter-finals
1975–76	1	1ª	17th	Round of 16
1976–77	2	2ª	10th	Fourth round
1977–78	2	2ª	9th	Fourth round
1978–79	2	2ª	6th	Second round
1979–80	2	2ª	13th	First round
1980–81	2	2ª	17th	Round of 16
1981–82	3	2ª B	10th	Second round
1982–83	3	2ª B	1st	Second round
1983–84	2	2ª	8th	Third round
1984–85	2	2ª	18th	Second round
1985–86	3	2ª B	7th	Third round
1986–87	3	2ª B	3rd	First round
1987–88	2	2ª	19th	First round
1988–89	3	2ª B	16th	Second round
1989–90	3	2ª B	4th	
1990–91	3	2ª B	5th	First round
1991–92	3	2ª B	9th	First round
1992–93	3	2ª B	3rd	Third round
1993–94	3	2ª B	6th	Second round

Season	Tier	Division	Place	Copa del Rey
1994–95	3	2ª B	13th	Second round
1995–96	3	2ª B	2nd	
1996–97	3	2ª B	6th	Third round
1997–98	3	2ª B	4th	
1998–99	3	2ª B	6th	First round
1999–2000	3	2ª B	1st	
2000–01	3	2ª B	5th	Quarter-finals
2001–02	3	2ª B	10th	Preliminary
2002–03	4	3ª	4th	
2003–04	4	3ª	1st	
2004–05	4	3ª	5th	First round
2005–06	4	3ª	1st	
2006–07	3	2ª B	13th	First round
2007–08	3	2ª B	5th	
2008–09	3	2ª B	10th	First round
2009–10	3	2ª B	1st	
2010–11	2	2ª	5th	Third round
2011–12	1	1ª	17th	Round of 32
2012–13	1	1ª	15th	Round of 32
2013–14	1	1ª	15th	Round of 32

Season	Tier	Division	Place	Copa del Rey
2014–15	1	1ª	17th	Round of 16
2015–16	1	1ª	16th	Round of 16
2016–17	1	1ª	20th	Round of 32
2017–18	2	2ª	10th	Second round
2018–19	2	2ª	2nd	Second round
2019–20	1	1ª	7th	Semi-finals
2020–21	1	1ª	9th	Quarter-finals
2021–22	1	1ª	18th	Second round
2022–23	2	2ª	1st	Second round
2023–24	1	1ª	20th	First round
2024–25	2	2ª	7th	Round of 32
2025–26	2	2ª	14th	Round of 32
2026–27	2	2ª		TBD

- 27 seasons in La Liga
- 37 seasons in the Segunda División
- 22 seasons in the Segunda División B
- 5 seasons in the Tercera División (1 on 3rd tier)
- 2 seasons in the Categorías Regionales

== Players ==
=== Current squad ===
As of 4 October 2026

Note: Flags indicate national team as defined under FIFA eligibility rules; some limited exceptions apply. Players may hold more than one non-FIFA nationality.

No.	Pos.	Nation	Player
1	GK	ESP	Alberto Flores
2	DF	ESP	Pau Casadesús
3	DF	ESP	Diego Hormigo
4	MF	ESP	Rubén Alcaraz (captain)
5	DF	ESP	Manu Lama (vice-captain)
6	MF	ESP	Gerard Gumbau (3rd captain)
7	MF	ESP	Sergio Rodelas
8	MF	ESP	Pedro Alemañ
9	FW	VEN	Alejandro Marqués
10	FW	ESP	Jorge Pascual
11	FW	ESP	José Arnáiz
13	GK	ESP	Raúl Lizoain (4th captain)

No.	Pos.	Nation	Player
16	DF	ESP	Diego Pampín
17	MF	FRA	Kader Bamba
18	DF	ESP	Sergio López
19	FW	NGR	Chinaza Okonyia
22	DF	SEN	Baïla Diallo
23	DF	GER	Benedikt Gimber
27	MF	ESP	Mario Gambín
30	DF	ESP	Juanjo Flores
32	MF	ESP	Dylan Rodríguez
33	DF	ESP	Angelo García
35	DF	MLI	Bourama Dembelé
36	FW	ESP	Owen Emeka

=== Reserve team ===
Note: Flags indicate national team as defined under FIFA eligibility rules; some limited exceptions apply. Players may hold more than one non-FIFA nationality.

No.	Pos.	Nation	Player
34	MF	ESP	Manu Maza
37	GK	ESP	Íker García

=== Out on loan ===
Note: Flags indicate national team as defined under FIFA eligibility rules; some limited exceptions apply. Players may hold more than one non-FIFA nationality.

No.	Pos.	Nation	Player
—	GK	ESP	Fran Árbol (at Zamora until 30 June 2027)
—	FW	MAR	Rayan Zinebi (at Real Madrid C until 30 June 2027)

No.	Pos.	Nation	Player
—	FW	ESP	Samu Cortés (at Recreativo Huelva until 30 June 2027)

=== Current technical staff ===
Position	Staff
Head coach	(Spain) Pacheta
Assistant coach	(Spain) Chema Monzón
Goalkeeping coach	(Spain) Cristopher Urbano (Spain) Juan Carlos Fernández
Fitness coach	(Spain) Jorge Trigueros (Spain) Alejandro Gutiérrez
Analyst	(Spain) Guillem Galmés (Spain) Álvaro Martínez (Spain) Jairo Martín
Delegate	(Spain) Manuel Lucena (Spain) Paco Morales
Equipment manager	(Spain) Miguel García (Spain) Antonio Saúl Hidalgo
Field delegate	(Spain) Pedro Rubio
Medical services coordinator	(Spain) Dioni González
Doctor	(Spain) Pablo Puertas (Spain) Pablo Navarro
Physiotherapist	(Spain) Alberto Vera (Spain) Alberto Lara (Spain) Juan Sánchez
Rehab fitness coach	(Spain) Manuel Dimas
Nutritionist	(Spain) José María Giménez

Last updated: 14 August 2026
Source: Granada CF (in Spanish)

== Honours ==
=== National ===
- Segunda División (4): 1940–41, 1956–57, 1967–68, 2022–23
- Segunda División B (3): 1982–83, 1999–00, 2009–10
- Tercera División (3): 1933–34, 2003–04, 2005–06
- Copa del Rey: runners-up (1): 1958–59

=== Regional tournaments ===
- Andalucia Cup (1): 1932–33
- Andalucia Championship reservations (1): 1971–72

=== Friendly ===
- Antonio Puerta Trophy (1): 2010

=== Individual ===
==== Pichichi Trophy ====
- La Liga: Enrique Porta (1971–72)
- Segunda División: Miguel (1964–65), Rafa (1955–56), Myrto Uzuni (2022–2023)

== European record ==
Season	Competition	Round	Opposition	Home	Away	Aggregate
2020–21	Europa League	2QR	(Albania) Teuta	—N/a	4–0	—N/a
2020–21	Europa League	3QR	(Georgia (country)) Locomotive Tbilisi	2−0	—N/a	—N/a
2020–21	Europa League	PO	(Sweden) Malmö FF	—N/a	3–1	—N/a
2020–21	Europa League	Group E	(Netherlands) PSV Eindhoven	0–1	2–1	2nd out of 4
2020–21	Europa League	Group E	(Greece) PAOK	0–0	0–0	2nd out of 4
2020–21	Europa League	Group E	(Cyprus) Omonia	2–1	2–0	2nd out of 4
2020–21	Europa League	R32	(Italy) Napoli	2–0	1–2	3–2
2020–21	Europa League	R16	(Norway) Molde	2–0	1–2	3–2
2020–21	Europa League	QF	(England) Manchester United	0–2	0–2	0–4

== Derby of eastern Andalusia ==
The Eastern Andalusia Derby is played between Granada and Málaga.

Updated to derby #90 played on September 20, 2024.

Competition	Played	Granada wins	Draws	Málaga wins	Granada goals	Málaga goals
La Liga	24	8	8	8	22	29
La Liga Play-off	2	1	1	0	3	2
Segunda	40	13	12	16	46	61
Segunda Play-off	2	1	0	1	3	3
Segunda B	8	3	5	0	6	3
Tercera	2	2	0	0	5	2
Copa del Rey	10	6	1	3	17	11
Overall	88	34	27	28	102	111

== Stadium ==
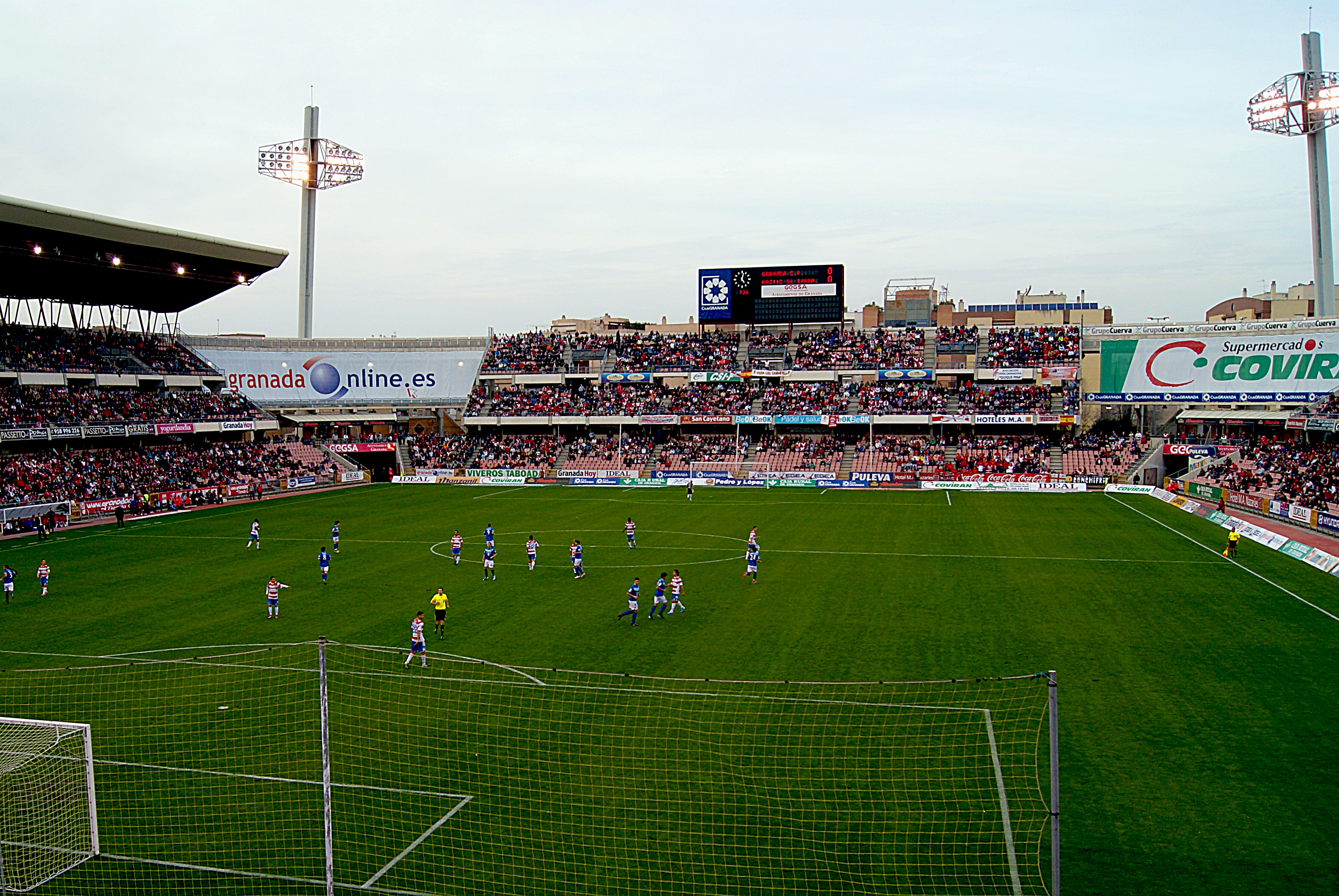
Granada playing at Nuevo Estadio de Los Cármenes against the Gimnàstic in 2010

After its foundation, the team played its home matches at the Campo de Las Tablas, inaugurated on 20 December 1931. On that day Granada CF won the match against the U.D. Andújar 1–0 in the Tercera Regional. Granada's stay at this ground was a short one; on 23 December 1934, a new municipal stadium, Estadio Los Cármenes, was opened. The club played in this stadium until 1995 when they moved to the Nuevo Los Cármenes Stadium (also owned by the Ayuntamiento de Granada). It was inaugurated on 16 May 1995, with a friendly fixture between Real Madrid and Bayer Leverkusen, whereas Granada CF played for the first time in the Summer of 1995, playing a friendly fixture against Real Betis. The stadium featured an original capacity of 16,212 seats. This was expanded to 22,524 after Granada CF's promotion to La Liga in the summer of 2011.

After achieving promotion to the First Division in 2019, the stadium has been renovated, such as the replacement of the playing surface, the repairing and painting of seats plus the addition of white seats to form the words "Granada CF" across from the main stand and "1931" on the South Stand, the expansion of the official club store (now located on the corner where the old tickets office was located), and finally, the replacement of the illumination system in line with the lighting requirements of La Liga. In addition, the club is working with Granada's council to get a deal for a long-lasting tenancy with the aim of performing a series of investments like a re-build of the stadium corners (which had been previously dismantled), establish shopping and entertainment zones or the expansion and refurbishment of sponsor and advertising areas.

- Dimensions: 105 × 68 meters
- Address: C/ Pintor Manuel Maldonado s/n
- Inauguration date: 16 May 1995, Real Madrid–Bayer Leverkusen (1–0)
- First Granada CF match: 22 August 1995, Granada–Real Betis (4–1) XXIII Granada Trophy

== Kit and colours ==
Upon its foundation, the club's kits were a shirt with blue and white vertical stripes and white shorts. After the Spanish Civil War the club owners went to Madrid to buy new ones, but they couldn't find other than red and white striped shirts. That became the official colour scheme from then on.

In the 1970s, the club changed the vertical stripes to horizontal. The kit alternated horizontal and vertical strip patterns until 2004–05, when a member assembly decided to settle for the horizontal pattern.

=== Shirt sponsors and manufacturers ===
Period	Kit manufacturer	Shirt sponsor
1984–87	Ressy	La General
1987–90	Umbro	Puleva
1990–92	Joma	Citroën
1992–93	Lotto	CC Neptuno
1993–94	Lotto	None
1994–95	Lotto	Sierra Nevada 95
1995–96	Lotto	Cervezas Alhambra
1996–98	Kelme	Cervezas Alhambra
1998–00	Joma	Jimesa
2000–03	Joma	La General
2003–04	Bemiser	Caja Rural
2004–05	Elements	Agua Sierra Cazorla
2005–06	Umbro	Puertas Castalla
2006–07	Umbro	CajaSur
2007–09	Patrick	CajaSur
2009–10	Macron	Covirán
2010–12	Legea	Caja Granada
2012–14	Luanvi	Caja Granada
2014–16	Joma	Solver
2016–18	Joma	Energy King
2018–19	Erreà	None
2019–22	Nike	Platzi
2022–	Adidas	Platzi

== Coaches ==
- (Hungary) Lippo Hertzka (1934–1935)
- (Spain) Gaspar Rubio (1939–1940)
- (Spain) Antonio Bonet Silvestre (1941–1943)
- (Spain) Francisco Bru (1941–1943)
- (Hungary) István Plattkó (1943–1945)
- (Spain) Gaspar Rubio (1950)
- (Argentina) Alejandro Scopelli (1957–1959)
- (Hungary) Jenő Kalmár (1958–1960)
- (Spain) Fernando Argila Pazzaglia (1960–1961)
- (Spain) Francisco Trinchant (1961)
- (Paraguay) Heriberto Herrera (1961–1962)
- (Spain) Ignacio Eizaguirre (1963–1964)
- (Spain) Francisco Antúnez (1963–1964)
- (Hungary) Jenő Kalmár (1965–1966)
- (France) Marcel Domingo (1968–1969)
- (Spain) Joseíto (1970–1972)
- (Spain) Pasieguito (1972–1973)
- (Spain) Joseíto (1973–1975)
- (Spain) Miguel Muñoz (1975–1976)
- (Uruguay) Héctor Núñez (1976)
- (Brazil) Vavá (1977–1978)
- (Spain) Francisco Gento (1980–1981)
- (Spain) José Mingorance (1981)
- (Spain) Antonio Ruiz (1981–1982)
- (Spain) Manuel Ruiz Sosa (1982–1983)
- (Argentina) Felipe Mesones (1983–1984)
- (Spain) Nando Yosu (1984)
- (Spain) Joaquín Peiró (1985–1988)
- (Spain) Manuel Ruiz Sosa (1988)
- (Spain) Pachín (1988–1989)
- (Spain) José Enrique Díaz (1989–1990)
- (Spain) Nando Yosu (1992–1994)
- (Spain) Lucas Alcaraz (1995–1998)
- (Spain) Paco Chaparro (1998–1999)
- (Argentina) Felipe Mesones (2000)
- (Spain) Ismael Díaz (2000)
- (Spain) José Ángel Moreno (2001)
- (Spain) Ramón Blanco (2001–2002)
- (Serbia) Josip Višnjić (2006–2007)
- (Spain) Óscar Cano (2007–2009)
- (Spain) Pedro Braojos (2008–2009)
- (Spain) Fabri (2010–2012)
- (Spain) Abel Resino (2012)
- (Spain) Juan Antonio Anquela (2012–2013)
- (Spain) Lucas Alcaraz (2013–2014)
- (Spain) Joaquín Caparrós (2014–2015)
- (Spain) Joseba Aguado (interim) (2015)
- (Spain) Abel Resino (2015)
- (Spain) José Ramón Sandoval (2015–2016)
- (Spain) José González (2016)
- (Spain) Paco Jémez (2016)
- (Spain) Lucas Alcaraz (2016–2017)
- (England) Tony Adams (2017)
- (Spain) José Luis Oltra (2017–2018)
- (Spain) Pedro Morilla Pineda (2018)
- (Spain) Miguel Ángel Portugal (2018)
- (Spain) Diego Martínez (2018–2021)
- (Spain) Robert Moreno (2021–2022)
- (Spain) Rubén Torrecilla (interim) (2022)
- (Spain) Aitor Karanka (2022)
- (Spain) Paco López (2022–2023)
- (Uruguay) Alexander Medina (2023–2024)
- (Spain) José Ramón Sandoval (2024)
- (Spain) Guille Abascal (2024)
- (Spain) Fran Escribá (2024–2025)
- (Spain) Pacheta (2025–)
