= 2017–18 Rayo Vallecano season =

Rayo Vallecano
2017–18 season
- President: Raúl Martín Presa
- Head coach: Michel
- Stadium: Campo de Fútbol de Vallecas
- Segunda División: 1st (promoted)
- Copa del Rey: Round 2
Home colours	Away colours	Third colours

The 2017–18 season is the 93rd season in Rayo Vallecano ’s history.

== Squad ==
As of 2 September 2017

Note: Flags indicate national team as defined under FIFA eligibility rules; some limited exceptions apply. Players may hold more than one non-FIFA nationality.

No.	Pos.	Nation	Player
1	GK	ESP	Alberto García (on loan from Getafe)
2	DF	ESP	Ernesto Galán
4	DF	ESP	Antonio Amaya
5	DF	ESP	Chechu Dorado
6	MF	ARG	Francisco Cerro
7	MF	ESP	Álex Moreno
8	FW	ARG	Óscar Trejo
9	MF	ARG	Chori Domínguez
10	MF	ESP	Roberto Trashorras (Captain)
11	MF	ESP	Adri Embarba
12	DF	ESP	Sergio Akieme
13	GK	ESP	Toño
15	DF	SEN	Abdoulaye Ba

No.	Pos.	Nation	Player
16	MF	ESP	Fran Beltrán
17	MF	ESP	Unai López (on loan from Athletic Bilbao)
18	MF	ESP	Diego Aguirre
19	MF	GUI	Lass Bangoura
20	DF	URU	Emiliano Velázquez (on loan from Atlético Madrid)
21	MF	ESP	Santi Comesaña
22	FW	ESP	Raúl de Tomás (on loan from Real Madrid)
24	FW	ESP	Javi Guerra
25	GK	ESP	Mario Fernández
26	MF	ESP	Joni Montiel
30	GK	COL	Lucho García
—	DF	ROU	Răzvan Raț
—	DF	BRA	Baiano

=== Transfers ===
- List of Spanish football transfers summer 2017#Rayo Vallecano

==== In ====
Date	Player	From	Type	Fee	Ref
21 June 2017	(Argentina) Óscar Trejo	(France) Toulouse	Transfer	Free	
30 June 2017	(Colombia) Johan Mojica	(Spain) Girona	Loan return	Free	
1 July 2017	(Spain) Sergio Akieme	(Spain) Rayo Vallecano B	Promoted		
13 July 2017	(Spain) Alberto García	(Spain) Getafe	Loan	Free	
18 July 2017	(Argentina) Francisco Cerro	(Argentina) Racing Club	Transfer	Free	
1 August 2017	(Spain) Unai López	(Spain) Athletic Bilbao	Loan	Free	
7 August 2017	(Argentina) Chori Domínguez	(Greece) Olympiacos	Transfer	Free	

==== Out ====
Date	Player	To	Type	Fee	Ref
29 June 2017	(Spain) Quini	(Spain) Granada	Transfer	Free	
30 June 2017	(Argentina) Paulo Gazzaniga	(England) Southampton	Loan return	Free	
30 June 2017	(Spain) Pablo Íñiguez	(Spain) Villarreal	Loan return	Free	
30 June 2017	(Spain) Tomás Mejías	(England) Middlesbrough	Loan return	Free	
30 June 2017	(Argentina) Franco Cristaldo	(Argentina) Boca Juniors	Loan return	Free	
1 July 2017	(Germany) Patrick Ebert	TBD		Free	
1 July 2017	(Angola) Manucho	TBD		Free	
1 July 2017	(Venezuela) Miku	TBD		Free	
3 July 2017	(Spain) Raúl Baena	(Spain) Granada	Transfer	Free	
6 July 2017	(Spain) Nacho	(Spain) Valladolid	Transfer	Free	
6 July 2017	(Spain) Jordi Gómez	(Bulgaria) Levski Sofia	Transfer	Free	
17 July 2017	(Spain) Toni Dovale	(India) Bengaluru	Transfer	Free	

== Competitions ==
=== Overall ===
Competition	Final position
Segunda División	1st
Copa del Rey	2nd Round

=== Liga ===
==== League table ====
Pos	Team	Pld	W	D	L	GF	GA	GD	Pts	Promotion, qualification or relegation
1	Rayo Vallecano (C, P)	42	21	13	8	67	48	+19	76	Promotion to La Liga
2	Huesca (P)	42	21	12	9	61	40	+21	75	Promotion to La Liga
3	Zaragoza	42	20	11	11	57	44	+13	71 (Note: Zaragoza finished ahead of Sporting Gijón on head-to-head points: Sporting Gijón 0–1 Zaragoza, Zaragoza 2–1 Sporting Gijón)	Qualification for promotion play-offs
4	Sporting Gijón	42	21	8	13	60	40	+20	71	Qualification for promotion play-offs
5	Valladolid (O, P)	42	19	10	13	69	55	+14	67	Qualification for promotion play-offs

Source: La Liga
Rules for classification: 1) points; 2) head-to-head points; 3) head-to-head goal difference; 4) goal difference; 5) number of goals scored
(C) Champions; (O) Play-off winners; (P) Promoted

==== Matches ====
Kickoff times are in CET. Win Draw Loss

Match	Opponent	Venue	Result
1	Oviedo	A	2–3
2	Numancia	H	2–2
3	Lorca	A	0–0
4	Osasuna	H	0–3
5	Sevilla At.	A	0–0
6	Cultural	H	3–1
7	Huesca	A	2–1
8	Valladolid	H	4–1
9	Almería	H	1–0
10	Reus	A	0–2
11	Sporting	H	1–1
12	Cádiz	A	0–0
13	Albacete	H	1–1
14	Zaragoza	A	3–2
15	Barcelona B	H	1–0
16	Tenerife	A	2–2
17	Granada	H	1–0
18	Córdoba	A	2–2
19	Alcorcón	H	2–1
20	Lugo	A	1–2
21	Nàstic	H	2–3

Match	Opponent	Venue	Result
22	Oviedo	H	2–2
23	Numancia	A	0–0
24	Lorca	H	5–1
25	Osasuna	A	1–1
26	Sevilla At.	H	2–0
27	Cultural	A	2–3
28	Huesca	H	3–0
29	Valladolid	A	1–1
30	Almería	A	0–1
31	Reus	H	3–2
32	Sporting	A	1–0
33	Cádiz	H	1–1
34	Albacete	A	0–1
35	Zaragoza	H	2–1
36	Barcelona B	A	2–3
37	Tenerife	H	3–1
38	Granada	A	0–2
39	Córdoba	H	1–2
40	Alcorcón	A	4–0
41	Lugo	H	1–0
42	Nàstic	A	2–0

=== Copa del Rey ===
6 September 2017 Round 2	Rayo Vallecano	0-3	Tenerife	Madrid
22:00	Antonio Amaya (yellow card) 61'; Domínguez (yellow card) 66'; Ernesto Galán (yellow card) 70'	Summary	Juan Carlos 4' 8' (yellow card) 39'; Aveldaño (yellow card) 14'; Brian Martín 20'	Stadium: Campo de Fútbol de Vallecas; Referee: (Spain) Eduardo Prieto

== Statistics ==
=== Appearances and goals ===
No.	Pos	Nat	Player	Total		Segunda División		Copa del Rey	
No.	Pos	Nat	Player	Apps	Goals	Apps	Goals	Apps	Goals
Goalkeepers
1	GK	(Spain) ESP	Alberto García	41	0	41	0	0	0
25	GK	(Spain) ESP	Mario Fernández	2	0	1	0	1	0
30	GK	(Colombia) COL	Lucho García	0	0	0	0	0	0
Defenders
2	DF	(Spain) ESP	Ernesto Galán	8	0	6+1	0	1	0
4	DF	(Spain) ESP	Antonio Amaya	18	1	11+6	1	1	0
5	DF	(Spain) ESP	Chechu Dorado	38	1	38	1	0	0
14	DF	(Brazil) BRA	Baiano	36	0	35+1	0	0	0
15	DF	(Senegal) SEN	Abdoulaye Ba	18	0	15+3	0	0	0
20	DF	(Uruguay) URU	Emiliano Velázquez	26	2	21+4	2	1	0
28	DF	(Spain) ESP	Sergio Akieme	4	0	3	0	1	0
Midfielders
6	MF	(Spain) ESP	Gorka Elustondo	14	0	3+11	0	0	0
7	MF	(Spain) ESP	Alex Moreno	40	3	39+1	3	0	0
9	MF	(Argentina) ARG	Chori Domínguez	20	2	9+10	2	1	0
10	MF	(Spain) ESP	Roberto Trashorras	7	0	5+2	0	0	0
17	MF	(Spain) ESP	Unai López	40	3	37+2	3	1	0
18	MF	(Spain) ESP	Diego Aguirre	20	3	10+9	3	0+1	0
23	MF	(Argentina) ARG	Francisco Cerro	13	0	2+10	0	1	0
27	MF	(Spain) ESP	Santi Comesaña	33	2	30+3	2	0	0
29	MF	(Spain) ESP	Fran Beltrán	41	0	37+3	0	1	0
Forwards
3	FW	(Portugal) POR	Bebé	17	3	9+8	3	0	0
8	FW	(Argentina) ARG	Óscar Trejo	36	12	36	12	0	0
11	FW	(Spain) ESP	Adri Embarba	42	8	41+1	8	0	0
22	FW	(Spain) ESP	Raúl de Tomás	32	24	30+2	24	0	0
24	FW	(Spain) ESP	Javi Guerra	19	3	2+16	3	1	0
Players who have made an appearance this season but have left the club
13	GK	(Spain) ESP	Toño	0	0	0	0	0	0
10	MF	(Argentina) ARG	Emiliano Armenteros	11	0	0+11	0	0	0
26	MF	(Spain) ESP	Joni Montiel	2	0	0+1	0	0+1	0
19	FW	(Guinea) GUI	Lass Bangoura	10	0	1+8	0	1	0
-	DF	(Romania) ROU	Răzvan Raț	0	0	0	0	0	0
