= Sergio Akieme =

Spanish footballer (born 1997)

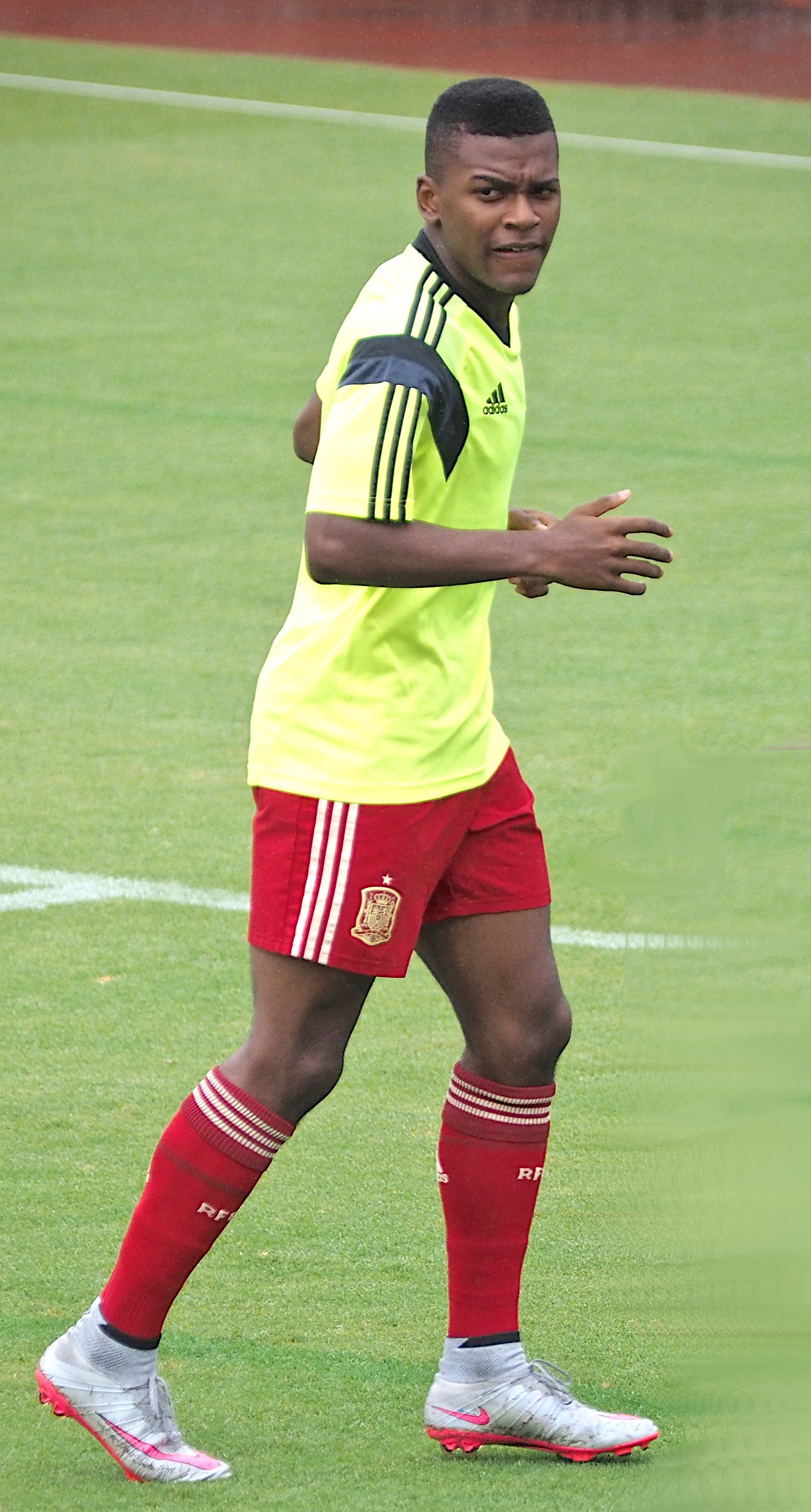
- Akieme with Spain U19 in 2015

Personal information
- Full name: Sergio Akieme Rodríguez
- Date of birth: 16 December 1997 (age 28)
- Place of birth: Madrid, Spain
- Height: 1.75 m (5 ft 9 in)
- Position: Left-back

Team information
- Current team: Reims
- Number: 18

Youth career
- 2010–2013: Getafe
- 2013–2015: Rayo Vallecano

Senior career*
Years	Team	Apps	(Gls)
2015–2017	Rayo Vallecano B	62	(0)
2016–2019	Rayo Vallecano	9	(0)
2019–2021	Barcelona B	24	(0)
2020–2021	→ Almería (loan)	34	(2)
2021–2024	Almería	78	(4)
2024–	Reims	77	(5)

International career
2015	Spain U18	3	(0)
2015	Spain U19	1	(0)
- * Club domestic league appearances and goals as of 11 May 2026

Sergio Akieme Rodríguez (born 16 December 1997) is a Spanish professional footballer who plays as a left-back for Ligue 2 club Reims. Born in Spain, he holds Equatoguinean citizenship.

== Club career ==
=== Rayo Vallecano ===
Akieme was born in Madrid through Equatoguinean parents – his father was born in Bata while his mother was born in Malabo. He joined Rayo Vallecano's youth setup in August 2013 at the age of 15, from Getafe.

Akieme made his senior debut with the reserves on 30 August 2015, starting in a 1–1 Tercera División away draw against Navalcarnero. On 30 December he was included in Paco Jémez's first team call up for a La Liga match against Atlético Madrid, but remained an unused substitute in the 2–0 home loss the following day.

Akieme made his professional debut on 6 September 2016, starting in a 2–0 Copa del Rey away win against Almería. He made his Segunda División debut the following 9 June, coming on as a second-half substitute for Lass Bangoura in a 2–1 away win against Sevilla B.

=== Barcelona ===
On 2 September 2019, Akieme signed a two-year deal with Barcelona, being initially assigned to the reserves in Segunda División B. Akieme has made a bright start to his career with Barcelona B, registering 4 assists in 23 games from left back. On 22 February he was named in the squad to play against Eibar, due to an injury of first choice left back Jordi Alba.

=== Loan and permanent transfer to Almería ===
On 19 September 2020, Akieme joined Almería in the second division on a year-long loan with an obligation to buy him for €3.5 million if he plays 22 games.

On 7 July 2021, Almería executed their option to buy Akieme permanently for €3.5 million. Barça reserve 10% of any future sale and also the right to first refusal.

== Career statistics ==
As of 29 May 2025

Appearances and goals by club, season and competition
Club	Season	League			National cup		Europe		Other		Total	
Club	Season	Division	Apps	Goals	Apps	Goals	Apps	Goals	Apps	Goals	Apps	Goals
Rayo Vallecano B	2015–16	Tercera División	31	0	—		—		—		31	0
Rayo Vallecano B	2016–17	Tercera División	31	0	—		—		—		31	0
Rayo Vallecano B	Total		62	0	—						62	0
Rayo Vallecano	2015–16	La Liga	0	0	—		—		—		0	0
Rayo Vallecano	2016–17	Segunda División	1	0	1	0	—		—		2	0
Rayo Vallecano	2017–18	Segunda División	3	0	1	0	—		—		4	0
Rayo Vallecano	2018–19	La Liga	2	0	2	0	—		—		4	0
Rayo Vallecano	2019–20	Segunda División	3	0	—		—		—		3	0
Rayo Vallecano	Total		9	0	4	0	—				13	0
Barcelona B	2019–20	Segunda División B	24	0	—		—		3 (Note: Three appearances in Segunda División B play-offs)	0	27	0
Barcelona	2019–20	La Liga	0	0	—		0	0	1 (Note: Club friendly)	0	1	0
Almería (loan)	2020–21	Segunda División	34	2	4	0	—		2 (Note: Two appearances in Segunda División play-offs)	0	40	2
Almería	2021–22	Segunda División	30	1	2	0	—		—		32	1
Almería	2022–23	La Liga	29	1	0	0	—		—		29	1
Almería	2023–24	La Liga	19	2	0	0	—		—		19	2
Almería	Total		78	4	2	0	—				80	4
Reims	2023–24	Ligue 1	13	2	—		—		—		13	2
Reims	2024–25	Ligue 1	30	2	5	0	—		2 (Note: Appearances in Ligue 1 relegation/promotion play-offs)	0	37	2
Reims	2025–26	Ligue 2	0	0	0	0	—		—		0	0
Reims	Total		43	4	5	0	—		2	0	50	4
Career total			250	10	15	0	0	0	8	0	273	10

== Honours ==
Rayo Vallecano

- Segunda División: 2017–18

Reims

- Coupe de France runner-up: 2024–25
