= 2016–17 Rayo Vallecano season =

Rayo Vallecano
2016–17 season
- President: Raúl Martín Presa
- Head coach: José Ramón Sandoval (1-13); Rubén Baraja (14-26); Michel (27-42)
- Stadium: Campo de Fútbol de Vallecas
- Segunda División: 12th
- Copa del Rey: 3rd round
Home colours	Away colours	Third colours

The 2016–17 season was the 92nd season in Rayo Vallecano ’s history and first back in the Segunda División after relegation the previous year.

== Squad ==
As of 2 February 2017

Note: Flags indicate national team as defined under FIFA eligibility rules; some limited exceptions apply. Players may hold more than one non-FIFA nationality.

No.	Pos.	Nation	Player
1	GK	ARG	Paulo Gazzaniga (on loan from Southampton)
2	DF	ESP	Ernesto Galán
3	DF	ESP	Nacho (2nd captain)
4	DF	ESP	Antonio Amaya (3rd captain)
5	DF	ESP	Chechu Dorado
6	MF	ESP	Álex Moreno
7	FW	VEN	Miku
8	MF	ESP	Raúl Baena
9	FW	ANG	Manucho
10	MF	ESP	Roberto Trashorras (Captain)
11	MF	ESP	Adri Embarba
13	GK	ESP	Toño
14	DF	ESP	Pablo Íñiguez (on loan from Villarreal)
15	DF	ROU	Răzvan Raț

No.	Pos.	Nation	Player
16	MF	ARG	Franco Cristaldo (on loan from Boca Juniors)
17	DF	ESP	Quini
18	DF	POR	Zé Castro (4th captain)
19	MF	GUI	Lass Bangoura
20	MF	GER	Patrick Ebert
21	MF	ESP	Jordi Gómez
22	MF	ESP	Diego Aguirre
24	FW	ESP	Javi Guerra
25	GK	ESP	Tomás Mejías (on loan from Middlesbrough)
26	MF	ESP	Joni Montiel
27	MF	ESP	Santi Comesaña
28	MF	ESP	Pablo Clavería
29	MF	ESP	Fran Beltrán

== Competitions ==
=== Overall ===
Competition	Final position
Segunda División	12th
Copa del Rey	3rd round

=== Liga ===
==== League table ====
Pos	Team	Pld	W	D	L	GF	GA	GD	Pts	Promotion, qualification or relegation
10	Córdoba	42	14	13	15	42	52	−10	55 (Note: Lugo and Córdoba finished ahead of Reus on head-to-head points: Lugo 7 pts, Córdoba 7 pts, Reus 3 pts. Lugo finished ahead of Córdoba on head-to-head points: Córdoba 3–3 Lugo, Lugo 1–0 Córdoba)	
11	Reus	42	13	16	13	31	29	+2	55	
12	Rayo Vallecano	42	14	11	17	44	44	0	53 (Note: Rayo Vallecano finished ahead of Sevilla Atlético on head-to-head points: Rayo Vallecano 1–1 Sevilla Atlético, Sevilla Atlético 1–2 Rayo Vallecano)	
13	Sevilla Atlético	42	13	14	15	55	56	−1	53	Ineligible for promotion and the Copa del Rey
14	Gimnàstic	42	12	16	14	47	51	−4	52	

Source: La Liga
Rules for classification: 1) points; 2) head-to-head points; 3) head-to-head goal difference; 4) goal difference; 5) number of goals scored

==== Matches ====
Kickoff times are in CET. Win Draw Loss

Match	Opponent	Venue	Result
1	Elche	A	2–1
2	Valladolid	H	0–0
3	Almería	A	3–0
4	Mallocra	H	1–0
5	Mirandés	A	2–1
6	Getafe	H	2–0
7	Reus	A	1–1
8	Cádiz	H	3–0
9	Oviedo	A	2–0
10	Numancia	H	3–3
11	Girona	H	1–0
12	Tenerife	A	3–2
13	UCAM	H	0–1
14	Lugo	A	1–0
15	Huesca	H	2–2
16	Levante	A	1–0
17	Alcorcón	H	2–0
18	Nàstic	A	0–1
19	Zaragoza	H	1–2
20	Córdoba	A	0–0
21	Sevilla At.	H	1–1

Match	Opponent	Venue	Result
22	Elche	H	1–1
23	Valladolid	A	2–1
24	Almería	H	1–0
25	Mallocra	A	2–1
26	Mirandés	H	1–2
27	Getafe	A	1–0
28	Reus	H	0–0
29	Cádiz	A	1–0
30	Oviedo	H	2–0
31	Numancia	A	0–0
32	Girona	A	1–3
33	Tenerife	H	1–1
34	UCAM	A	0–1
35	Lugo	H	2–0
36	Huesca	A	2–0
37	Levante	H	2–1
38	Alcorcón	A	2–0
39	Nàstic	H	2–0
40	Zaragoza	A	1–1
41	Córdoba	H	1–2
42	Sevilla At.	A	1–2

=== Copa del Rey ===
6 September 2016 Round 2	Almería	0 - 2	Rayo Vallecano	Almería
22:00	José Jurado (yellow card) 55'	Report	Diego Aguirre (yellow card) 10' (goal) 64' 90+2'; Antonio Amaya (yellow card) 34'; Santi Comesaña (yellow card) 60'; Ernesto Galán (yellow card) 67'; Zuculini (yellow card) 78'; Mojica (yellow card) 89'	Stadium: Estadio de los Juegos Mediterráneos; Attendance: 5,397; Referee: (Spain) Dámaso Arcediano

12 October 2016 Round 3	Rayo Vallecano	1 - 1 (a.e.t.) (4 - 5 p)	Gimnàstic de Tarragona	Madrid
17:00	Manucho 51' (yellow card) 76'; Fran Beltrán (yellow card) 60'; Quini (yellow card) 68'; Roberto Trashorras (yellow card) 81'	Report	Maloku 24' (yellow card) 44'; Xavi Molina (yellow card) 87'; Delgado (yellow card) 88'; Dimitrievski (yellow card) 90'; Moha Rharsalla (yellow card) 90'	Stadium: Campo de Fútbol de Vallecas; Attendance: 5,282; Referee: (Spain) Rubén Eiriz
