= Joni Montiel =

Spanish footballer (born 1998)

Personal information
- Full name: Jonathan Montiel Caballero
- Date of birth: 3 September 1998 (age 28)
- Place of birth: Madrid, Spain
- Height: 1.73 m (5 ft 8 in)
- Position: Midfielder

Team information
- Current team: Qarabağ
- Number: 9

Youth career
- 2010–2016: Rayo Vallecano

Senior career*
Years	Team	Apps	(Gls)
2015–2017	Rayo Vallecano B	33	(7)
2015–2025	Rayo Vallecano	59	(3)
2018	→ Toledo (loan)	10	(2)
2018–2019	→ Deportivo B (loan)	34	(4)
2019	→ Deportivo La Coruña (loan)	1	(0)
2021–2022	→ Oviedo (loan)	28	(3)
2022–2023	→ Levante (loan)	39	(7)
2023–2024	→ Valladolid (loan)	11	(1)
2024	→ Burgos (loan)	17	(1)
2025–	Qarabağ	18	(5)

International career
2014	Spain U17	2	(0)
2016	Spain U18	2	(0)
2016	Spain U19	5	(0)
- * Club domestic league appearances and goals as of 22 June 2026

Jonathan "Joni" Montiel Caballero (born 3 September 1998) is a Spanish professional footballer who plays as a midfielder for Azerbaijan Premier League club Qarabağ.

== Club career ==
Montiel was born in El Pozo del Tío Raimundo, Puente de Vallecas, Madrid. He joined Rayo Vallecano's youth setup in 2010 at the age of 11. He made his senior debut on 25 October 2015, starting with the reserves in a 1–1 Tercera División home draw against Fútbol Alcobendas Sport.

Montiel was first included in a first team matchday squad at the age of 17, remaining an unused substitute in Rayo Vallecano's 3–1 loss at neighbours Getafe CF in the last 32 second leg of that season's Copa del Rey, advancing on the away goals rule. Four days later, he featured in a La Liga game for the first time, playing the final ten minutes in place of Zé Castro as the team lost 10–2 at Real Madrid; aged 17 years and 108 days, he became the youngest player ever to appear for the club in an official match, surpassing Isi by 32 days.

On 24 April 2016, Montiel scored his first senior goal, netting the second for the B's in a 3–0 home win against AD Parla. In the 2016 summer, after the main squad's relegation, he was definitely promoted to José Ramón Sandoval's team.

On 30 January 2018, Montiel signed a new three-year contract with Rayo and was immediately loaned to CD Toledo in Segunda División B. On 31 August, he moved to Deportivo Fabril also in a temporary deal.

Montiel managed to feature in one league match for Deportivo de La Coruña's main squad before returning to Rayo in July 2019; he was subsequently assigned to the main squad in Segunda División. He scored his first professional goal on 8 March 2020, netting his team's last goal before the COVID-19 pandemic in a 3–2 home loss against Elche CF.

On 2 September 2020, after staying more than 20 days without training due to rejecting Rayo's renewal offer, Montiel extended his contract with the club until 2024. He featured in 23 league matches during the campaign, scoring once as his side returned to the top tier after a two-year absence.

On 28 July 2021, Montiel was loaned to Real Oviedo in the second division, for one year. On 14 July of the following year, he moved to fellow league team Levante UD, also in a temporary deal.

On 10 August 2023, Montiel joined Real Valladolid on loan for the 2023–24 Segunda División season. In January 2024, his loan was cut short and he moved to fellow league team Burgos CF also in a temporary deal.

On 3 August 2025, Montiel signed a 2+2 year contract with Qarabağ FK.

== Career statistics ==
=== Club ===
As of match played 20 August 2021

Appearances and goals by club, season and competition
Club	Season	League			National cup		Other		Total	
Club	Season	Division	Apps	Goals	Apps	Goals	Apps	Goals	Apps	Goals
Rayo Vallecano	2015–16	La Liga	8	0	2	0	—		10	0
Rayo Vallecano	2016–17	Segunda Divisíon	2	0	0	0	—		2	0
Rayo Vallecano	2017–18	Segunda Divisíon	1	0	1	0	—		2	0
Rayo Vallecano	2019–20	Segunda Divisíon	25	2	4	0	—		29	2
Rayo Vallecano	2020–21	Segunda Divisíon	23	1	3	0	0	0	26	1
Rayo Vallecano	Total		59	3	10	0	0	0	69	3
Toledo (loan)	2017–18	Segunda Divisíon B	10	2	—		—		10	2
Deportivo B (loan)	2018–19	Segunda Divisíon B	34	4	—		—		34	4
Deportivo La Coruña (loan)	2018–19	Segunda Divisíon	1	0	0	0	—		1	0
Oviedo (loan)	2021–22	Segunda Divisíon	1	0	0	0	—		1	0
Career total			105	9	10	0	0	0	115	9
