= 2015–16 Rayo Vallecano season =

Rayo Vallecano
2015–16 season
- President: Raúl Martín Presa
- Head coach: Paco Jémez
- Stadium: Campo de Vallecas
- La Liga: 18th (relegated)
- Copa del Rey: Round of 16
- Top goalscorer: Javi Guerra (9 goals)
| Home colours | Away colours | Third colours |

The 2015–16 season is the 91st season in Rayo’s history and the 17th in the top-tier.

== Current squad ==
As of 15 August 2015

Note: Flags indicate national team as defined under FIFA eligibility rules; some limited exceptions apply. Players may hold more than one non-FIFA nationality.

| No. | Pos. | Nation | Player |
|---|---|---|---|
| 1 | GK | ESP | David Cobeño (captain) |
| 2 | DF | ESP | Tito |
| 3 | DF | ESP | Nacho |
| 4 | DF | ESP | Antonio Amaya |
| 5 | DF | ESP | José Dorado |
| 6 | MF | MLI | Ousseynou Cissé |
| 7 | FW | VEN | Miku |
| 8 | MF | ESP | Raúl Baena |
| 9 | FW | ANG | Manucho |
| 10 | MF | ESP | Roberto Trashorras (vice-captain) |
| 11 | MF | ESP | Adri Embarba |
| 12 | MF | ARG | Luis Fariña (on loan from Benfica) |
| 13 | GK | ESP | Juan Carlos |

| No. | Pos. | Nation | Player |
|---|---|---|---|
| 14 | MF | ESP | Pablo Hernández (on loan from Al-Arabi) |
| 15 | DF | ROU | Răzvan Raț |
| 16 | MF | CHN | Zhang Chengdong (on loan from Beijing Guoan) |
| 17 | DF | ESP | Quini |
| 18 | DF | POR | Zé Castro |
| 19 | MF | GUI | Lass Bangoura |
| 20 | MF | GER | Patrick Ebert |
| 21 | MF | ESP | Jozabed |
| 23 | FW | POR | Bebé (on loan from Benfica) |
| 24 | FW | ESP | Javi Guerra |
| 25 | GK | ESP | Toño |
| 27 | DF | ESP | Diego Llorente (on loan from Real Madrid) |

=== Out on loan ===
Note: Flags indicate national team as defined under FIFA eligibility rules; some limited exceptions apply. Players may hold more than one non-FIFA nationality.

| No. | Pos. | Nation | Player |
|---|---|---|---|
| — | DF | COL | Johan Mojica (at Valladolid) |
| — | MF | ESP | Álex Moreno (at Elche) |
| — | MF | ESP | Diego Aguirre (at Oviedo) |

=== Staff ===
- Head coach:
  - Paco Jémez
- Director of football:
  - Felipe Miñambres

== Competitions ==
=== Overall ===
| Competition | Started round | Final position / round | First match | Last match |
|---|---|---|---|---|
| La Liga | – | | | |
| Copa del Rey | Round of 32 | | | |

Updated to match played 15 August 2015
Source: Competitions

=== Overview ===
| Competition | Record | | | | | | | |
| Competition | Pld | W | D | L | GF | GA | GD | Win % |
|---|---|---|---|---|---|---|---|---|
| La Liga | 38 | 9 | 11 | 18 | 52 | 73 | −21 | 23.68 |
| Copa del Rey | 4 | 1 | 1 | 2 | 4 | 7 | −3 | 25.00 |
| Total | 42 | 10 | 12 | 20 | 56 | 80 | −24 | 23.81 |

Last updated: 15 May 2016
Source: Competitions

=== La Liga ===
==== League table ====
| Pos | Team | Pld | W | D | L | GF | GA | GD | Pts | Qualification or relegation |
|---|---|---|---|---|---|---|---|---|---|---|
| 16 | Granada | 38 | 10 | 9 | 19 | 46 | 69 | −23 | 39 (Note: Granada finished ahead of Sporting Gijón on head-to-head record; Granada 2–0 Sporting Gijón, Sporting Gijón 3–3 Granada.) | |
| 17 | Sporting Gijón | 38 | 10 | 9 | 19 | 40 | 62 | −22 | 39 | |
| 18 | Rayo Vallecano (R) | 38 | 9 | 11 | 18 | 52 | 73 | −21 | 38 | Relegation to Segunda División |
| 19 | Getafe (R) | 38 | 9 | 9 | 20 | 37 | 67 | −30 | 36 | Relegation to Segunda División |
| 20 | Levante (R) | 38 | 8 | 8 | 22 | 37 | 70 | −33 | 32 | Relegation to Segunda División |

Source: La Liga, Soccerway
Rules for classification: 1) Points; 2) Head-to-head points; 3) Head-to-head goal difference; 4) Goal difference; 5) Goals scored; 6) Fair-play points; 7) Play-off.
(R) Relegated

==== Results summary ====
| Overall | | | | | | | | Home | | | | | | Away | | | | | |
| Pld | W | D | L | GF | GA | GD | Pts | W | D | L | GF | GA | GD | W | D | L | GF | GA | GD |
|---|---|---|---|---|---|---|---|---|---|---|---|---|---|---|---|---|---|---|---|
| 38 | 9 | 11 | 18 | 52 | 73 | −21 | 38 | 8 | 4 | 7 | 29 | 29 | 0 | 1 | 7 | 11 | 23 | 44 | −21 |

Last updated: 15 May 2016.

==== Result round by round ====
| Round | 1 | 2 | 3 | 4 | 5 | 6 | 7 | 8 | 9 | 10 | 11 | 12 | 13 | 14 | 15 | 16 | 17 | 18 | 19 | 20 | 21 | 22 | 23 | 24 | 25 | 26 | 27 | 28 | 29 | 30 | 31 | 32 | 33 | 34 | 35 | 36 | 37 | 38 |
|---|---|---|---|---|---|---|---|---|---|---|---|---|---|---|---|---|---|---|---|---|---|---|---|---|---|---|---|---|---|---|---|---|---|---|---|---|---|---|
| Ground | H | A | H | A | H | A | H | A | H | A | H | A | H | A | H | A | H | H | A | A | H | A | H | A | H | A | H | A | H | A | H | A | H | A | H | A | A | H |
| Result | D | L | L | W | W | L | L | L | W | L | W | D | L | L | L | L | L | D | L | D | W | D | W | D | D | D | L | L | D | D | W | L | W | D | L | L | L | W |
| Position | 10 | 16 | 19 | 12 | 9 | 11 | 15 | 15 | 14 | 15 | 12 | 13 | 14 | 16 | 18 | 18 | 19 | 19 | 19 | 18 | 17 | 19 | 15 | 15 | 15 | 14 | 17 | 17 | 16 | 16 | 16 | 16 | 16 | 16 | 16 | 17 | 17 | 18 |

A = Away; H = Home; W = Win; D = Draw; L = Loss

==== Matches ====
Win Draw Loss

| 2 August 2015 1 | Rayo Vallecano | 0–0 | Valencia | Madrid |
| 22:30 CEST (UTC+02:00) | Tito (yellow card) 42'; Manucho (yellow card) 49'; Nacho (yellow card) 74' | Report | Mustafi (yellow card) 56' | Stadium: Vallecas; Attendance: 9,442; Referee: Alberto Undiano Mallenco |

| 29 August 2015 2 | Celta Vigo | 3–0 | Rayo Vallecano | Vigo |
| 22:00 CEST (UTC+02:00) | Nolito 11' (pen.), 50', (yellow card) 41'; Fernández (yellow card) 41'; Jonny (yellow card) 68'; Fontàs 88' | Report | Toño (red card) 9'; Manucho (yellow card) 61'; Trashorras (yellow card) 87' | Stadium: Balaídos; Attendance: 16,344; Referee: Juan Martínez Munuera |

| 14 September 2015 3 | Rayo Vallecano | 1–3 | Deportivo La Coruña | Madrid |
| 20:30 CEST (UTC+02:00) | Embarba 27'; Ebert (yellow card) 35' (yellow-red card) 77'; Llorente (yellow card) 73' | Report | Borges 7'; Luis Alberto 28'; Laure (yellow card) 32'; Arribas (yellow card) 45'; Lucas 61' | Stadium: Vallecas; Attendance: 11,803; Referee: Ricardo de Burgos Bengoetxea |

| 20 September 2015 4 | Las Palmas | 0–1 | Rayo Vallecano | Las Palmas |
| 20:30 CEST (UTC+02:00) | Hernán (yellow card) 43'; Wakaso (yellow card) 62'; Araujo (yellow card) 75' | Report | Baena (yellow card) 24'; Embarba (yellow card) 28'; Amaya (yellow card) 33'; Guerra 42'; Nacho (yellow card) 60'; Raț (yellow card) 71' | Stadium: Gran Canaria; Attendance: 19,350; Referee: José González González |

| 20 September 2015 5 | Rayo Vallecano | 2–1 | Sporting Gijón | Madrid |
| 20:00 CEST (UTC+02:00) | Trashorras 40' (pen.); Guera 48'; Baena (yellow card) 73'; Nacho (yellow card) 84' | Report | Bernardo (yellow card) 37' (yellow-red card) 39'; Jony 49'; Canella (yellow card) 76' | Stadium: Vallecas; Attendance: 10,941; Referee: Iñaki Vicandi Garrido |

| 26 September 2015 6 | Sevilla | 3–2 | Rayo Vallecano | Seville |
| 20:30 CEST (UTC+02:00) | Iborra (yellow card) 16'; Gameiro 23'; Nzonzi 45+1'; Konoplyanka 86' | Report | Llorente (yellow card) 15'; Amaya (yellow card) 16' (yellow-red card) 83'; Bebé 51'; Guerra 68'; Trashorras (yellow card) 87' | Stadium: Ramón Sánchez Pizjuán; Attendance: 33,779; Referee: Alejandro Hernández Hernández |

| 4 October 2015 7 | Rayo Vallecano | 0–2 | Real Betis | Madrid |
| 12:00 CEST (UTC+02:00) | Bangoura (yellow card) 52'; Guerra (yellow card) 68'; Bebé (yellow card) 89'; Raț (yellow card) 90+3' | Report | Westermann 20'; Rennella (yellow card) 37'; Piccini (yellow card) 40'; Castro 61' | Stadium: Vallecas; Attendance: 11,719; Referee: Ignacio Iglesias Villanueva |

| 17 October 2015 8 | Barcelona | 5–2 | Rayo Vallecano | Barcelona |
| 20:30 CEST (UTC+02:00) | Neymar 22' (pen.), 32' (pen.), 69', 70'; Suárez 77'; Piqué (yellow card) 79' | Report | Guerra 15'; Llorente (yellow card) 21'; Dorado (yellow card) 49'; Jozabed 86' | Stadium: Camp Nou; Attendance: 73,805; Referee: Pedro Pérez Montero |

| 23 October 2015 9 | Rayo Vallecano | 3–0 | Espanyol | Madrid |
| 20:30 CEST (UTC+02:00) | Castro (yellow card) 30'; Trashorras 36' (pen.); Ebert (yellow card) 54'; Tito (yellow card) 72' (yellow-red card) 90+2'; Guerra 76', 78' | Report | Roco (yellow card) 35'; Sánchez (yellow card) 41' (yellow-red card) 66' | Stadium: Vallecas; Attendance: 10,431; Referee: Eduardo Prieto Iglesias |

| 1 November 2015 10 | Eibar | 1–0 | Rayo Vallecano | Eibar |
| 12:00 CET (UTC+01:00) | Llorente 21' (o.g.); Enrich (yellow card) 69'; García (yellow card) 81' | Report | Ebert (yellow card) 37'; Bebé (yellow card) 58'; Guerra (yellow card) 90+2' | Stadium: Ipurua; Attendance: 5,363; Referee: Alfonso Álvarez Izquierdo |

| 7 November 2015 11 | Rayo Vallecano | 2–1 | Granada | Madrid |
| 20:30 CET (UTC+01:00) | Guerra 3', 10'; Castro (yellow card) 13' (yellow-red card) 19'; Tito (yellow card) 46'; Trashorras (yellow card) 90+3' | Report | Piti (yellow card) 45+2'; Babin 53'; Krhin (yellow card) 63'; Pérez (yellow card) 70' | Stadium: Vallecas; Attendance: 9,921; Referee: Jesús Gil Manzano |

| 23 November 2015 12 | Getafe | 1–1 | Rayo Vallecano | Getafe |
| 20:30 CET (UTC+01:00) | Vázquez (yellow card) 54'; Vigaray (yellow card) 72'; Šćepović (yellow card) 83'; J. Rodríguez (yellow card) 89'; Yoda (yellow card) 90+2' | Report | Baena (yellow card) 27'; Guerra (yellow card) 35'; Trashorras (yellow card) 50'; Jozabed 73', (yellow card) 90+2' | Stadium: Coliseum Alfonso Pérez; Attendance: 5,088; Referee: Ricardo de Burgos Bengoetxea |

| 29 November 2015 13 | Rayo Vallecano | 0–3 | Athletic Bilbao | Madrid |
| 18:15 CET (UTC+01:00) | Baena (yellow card) 17'; Trashorras (yellow card) 26'; Nacho (yellow card) 59'; Tito (yellow card) 90+2' | Report | Aduriz 1', 24' (pen.), 60'; Laporte (red card) 64' | Stadium: Vallecas; Attendance: 13,100; Referee: Alejandro Hernández Hernández |

| 6 December 2015 14 | Villarreal | 2–1 | Rayo Vallecano | Villarreal |
| 16:00 CET (UTC+01:00) | Dos Santos (yellow card) 35'; Bakambu 69', 86' | Report | Baena (yellow card) 33'; Jozabed 41'; Castro (yellow card) 60'; Miku (yellow card) 80'; Quini (yellow card) 88' | Stadium: El Madrigal; Attendance: 16,101; Referee: Xavier Estrada Fernández |

| 13 December 2015 15 | Rayo Vallecano | 1–2 | Málaga | Madrid |
| 12:00 CET (UTC+01:00) | Guerra 6', (yellow card) 90+5' | Report | Čop (yellow card) 31', (goal) 87'; Albentosa (yellow card) 37'; Charles 59' | Stadium: Vallecas; Attendance: 9,301; Referee: Carlos Clos Gómez |

| 20 December 2015 16 | Real Madrid | 10–2 | Rayo Vallecano | Madrid |
| 16:00 CET (UTC+01:00) | Danilo 3', (yellow card) 72'; Bale 25', 41', 61', 70'; Ronaldo 30' (pen.), 53'; Benzema 48', 79', 90+1' | Report | Amaya 10'; Jozabed 12'; Tito (red card) 14'; Trashorras (yellow card) 15'; Baena (yellow card) 19' (yellow-red card) 28'; Nacho (yellow card) 27' | Stadium: Santiago Bernabéu; Attendance: 61,564; Referee: Ignacio Iglesias Villanueva |

| 30 December 2015 17 | Rayo Vallecano | 0–2 | Atlético Madrid | Madrid |
| 18:15 CET (UTC+01:00) | Yoel (yellow card) 33'; Llorente (yellow card) 69'; Castro (yellow card) 80' | Report | Torres (yellow card) 43'; Gámez (yellow card) 72'; Giménez (yellow card) 74'; Correa 88'; Griezmann 90' | Stadium: Vallecas |

| 3 January 2016 18 | Rayo Vallecano | 2–2 | Real Sociedad | Madrid |
| 12:00 CET (UTC+01:00) | Llorente 15', (yellow card) 48'; Jozabed 51'; Quini (yellow card) 56'; Castro (yellow card) 71' | Report | C. Martínez (yellow card) 19'; Elustondo 27'; Bergara (yellow card) 37'; Bruma 63'; Berchiche (yellow card) 70' | Stadium: Vallecas; Attendance: 10,756; Referee: Antonio Mateu Lahoz |

| 9 January 2016 19 | Levante | 2–1 | Rayo Vallecano | Valencia |
| 12:00 (UTC+1) | Feddal (yellow card) 34'; Simão Mate (yellow card) 37'; Deyverson (yellow card) 72', (goal) 72'; Morales 81'; Verza (yellow card) 85'; Xumetra (yellow card) 90+3' | Report | Hernández 83'; Guerra (yellow card) 89' | Stadium: Ciutat de València; Attendance: 10,589; Referee: Mario Melero López |

| 17 January 2016 20 | Valencia | 2–2 | Rayo Vallecano | Valencia |
| 22:05 (UTC+1) | Negredo 55'; Paco (yellow card) 86', (goal) 88' | Report | Jozabed 15'; Llorente (yellow card) 19', (goal) 69'; Quini (yellow card) 78'; Bangoura (yellow card) 81' | Stadium: Mestalla; Referee: Eduardo Prieto Iglesias |

| 23 January 2016 21 | Rayo Vallecano | 3–0 | Celta Vigo | Madrid |
| 20:30 (UTC+1) | Miku 21'; Tito 26'; Jozabed 36'; Dorado (yellow card) 80'; Quini (yellow card) 88'; Trashorras (yellow card) 90+2' | Report | Beauvue (yellow card) 19'; Goldar (yellow card) 35'; Orellana (yellow card) 39'; Dražić (yellow card) 45+1' | Stadium: Vallecas; Attendance: 10,780; Referee: Santiago Jaime Latre |

| 1 February 2016 22 | Deportivo La Coruña | 2–2 | Rayo Vallecano | A Coruña |
| 20:30 (UTC+1) | Lucas 19'; Fajr 46' | Report | Miku 8'; Jozabed 23' | Stadium: Riazor; Attendance: 19,055; Referee: Iñaki Vicandi Garrido |

| 7 February 2016 23 | Rayo Vallecano | 2–0 | Las Palmas | Madrid |
| 18:15 (UTC+1) | Miku 3', (yellow card) 84'; Llorente (yellow card) 28'; Baena (yellow card) 39'; Bebé 74' | Report | Castellano (yellow card) 45' | Stadium: Vallecas; Attendance: 11,565; Referee: Ignacio Iglesias Villanueva |

| 14 February 2016 24 | Sporting Gijón | 2–2 | Rayo Vallecano | Gijón |
| 20:30 (UTC+1) | Guerrero 5'; Vranješ (yellow card) 27'; Rachid (yellow card) 44'; Halilović 45+1'; Álvarez (yellow card) 63' | Report | Nacho (yellow card) 22'; Quini (yellow card) 30'; Miku 39'; Jozabed 59'; Iturra (yellow card) 62'; Hernández (yellow card) 77' | Stadium: El Molinón; Attendance: 21,987; Referee: Carlos Clos Gómez |

| 21 February 2016 25 | Rayo Vallecano | 2–2 | Sevilla | Madrid |
| 12:00 (UTC+1) | Baena (yellow card) 16'; Manucho 43'; Jozabed (yellow card) 44'; Miku (yellow card) 57', (goal) 62'; Embarba (yellow card) 64'; Llorente (yellow card) 75'; Hernández (yellow card) 90+3' | Report | Nzonzi 10'; Iborra 20'; Coke (yellow card) 59'; Banega (yellow card) 90+1' | Stadium: Vallecas; Attendance: 12,375; Referee: Xavier Estrada Fernández |

| 27 February 2016 26 | Real Betis | 2–2 | Rayo Vallecano | Gijón |
| 18:15 (UTC+1) | Castro 14', 28'; Ceballos (yellow card) 62'; Petros (yellow card) 90+5' | Report | Manucho 48', 51'; Trashorras (yellow card) 62'; Llorente (yellow card) 71'; Quini (yellow card) 76' | Stadium: El Molinón; Attendance: 35,666; Referee: Antonio Mateu Lahoz |

| 3 March 2016 27 | Rayo Vallecano | 1–5 | Barcelona | Madrid |
| 21:00 CET (UTC+01:00) | Llorente (red card) 42'; Manucho 57'; Iturra (red card) 67' | Report | Rakitić 22'; Messi 23', 53', 72'; Turan (yellow card) 78', (goal) 86'; Neymar (yellow card) 87' | Stadium: Vallecas; Attendance: 14,430; Referee: Iñaki Vicandi Garrido |

| 6 March 2016 28 | Espanyol | 2–1 | Rayo Vallecano | Barcelona |
| 20:30 CET (UTC+01:00) | Abraham 12'; Sánchez (yellow card) 24' (yellow-red card) 89'; Pérez 77'; López (yellow card) 81'; Diop (yellow card) 89'; Álvaro (yellow card) 90+1' | Report | Crespo (yellow card) 15'; Embarba (yellow card) 31'; Bebé 67'; Baena (yellow card) 70'; Guerra (yellow card) 89' | Stadium: Cornellà-El Prat; Attendance: 22,638; Referee: David Fernández Borbalán |

| 13 March 2016 29 | Rayo Vallecano | 1–1 | Eibar | Madrid |
| 22:05 CET (UTC+01:00) | Castro 7'; Özbiliz (yellow card) 33'; Llorente (yellow card) 44'; Miku (yellow card) 45+1'; Piti (yellow card) 59'; Embarba (yellow card) 76' | Report | Escalante 36'; Radošević (yellow card) 67' (yellow-red card) 85'; Ramis (yellow card) 80' | Stadium: Vallecas; Attendance: 10,567; Referee: Alfonso Álvarez Izquierdo |

| 19 March 2016 30 | Granada | 2–2 | Rayo Vallecano | Granada |
| 18:15 (UTC+1) | El-Arabi 11', 54' (pen.); Success (yellow card) 17' (yellow-red card) 70'; Costa (yellow card) 84' | Report | Crespo (yellow card) 24'; Quini (yellow card) 38'; Hernández 45'; Juan Carlos (yellow card) 52'; Castro (yellow card) 78', (goal) 87'; Embarba (yellow card) 90' | Stadium: Los Cármenes; Attendance: 18,848; Referee: Alejandro Hernández Hernández |

| 3 April 2016 31 | Rayo Vallecano | 2–0 | Getafe | Madrid |
| 20:30 (UTC+1) | Yoel (red card) 15'; Guerra 15', (yellow card) 69'; Baena (yellow card) 38'; Miku 71'; Tito (yellow card) 72'; Manucho (yellow card) 90+1' | Report | J. Rodríguez (yellow card) 37'; Vigaray (yellow card) 40'; Sarabia (yellow card) 45+1'; Cala (yellow card) 53'; Vergini (yellow card) 90+1' | Stadium: Vallecas; Referee: Santiago Jaime Latre |

| 10 April 2016 32 | Athletic Bilbao | 1–0 | Rayo Vallecano | Bilbao |
| 20:30 CEST (UTC+02:00) | García (yellow card) 16'; Williams 61' | Report | Nacho (yellow card) 2'; Baena (yellow card) 16'; Castro (yellow card) 52' | Stadium: San Mamés; Attendance: 37,597; Referee: Jesús Gil Manzano |

| 17 April 2016 33 | Rayo Vallecano | 2–1 | Villarreal | Madrid |
| 18:15 (UTC+1) | Guerra 7', (yellow card) 57'; Amaya (yellow card) 68'; Miku 81' | Report | Adrián 20'; Ruiz (yellow card) 57'; Marín (yellow card) 59'; Mario (yellow card) 72'; Matías Nahuel (yellow card) 80' | Stadium: Vallecas; Attendance: 12,628; Referee: Ignacio Iglesias Villanueva |

| 20 April 2016 34 | Málaga | 1–1 | Rayo Vallecano | Málaga |
| 20:45 (UTC+1) | Recio (yellow card) 66'; Ricca 90+1' | Report | Llorente (yellow card) 29'; Hernández (yellow card) 37'; Baena 62'; Trashorras (yellow card) 78' | Stadium: La Rosaleda; Attendance: 13,579; Referee: Alberto Undiano Mallenco |

| 23 April 2016 35 | Rayo Vallecano | 2–3 | Real Madrid | Madrid |
| 16:00 CEST (UTC+02:00) | Embarba 7'; Miku 14'; Jozabed (yellow card) 53'; Crespo (yellow card) 62'; Iturra (yellow card) 68'; Trashorras (yellow card) 73'; Amaya (yellow card) 77'; Raț (yellow card) 83' | Report | Bale 35', 81'; Vázquez 52'; Kovačić (yellow card) 67' | Stadium: Vallecas; Attendance: 13,134; Referee: Alejandro Hernández Hernández |

| 30 April 2016 36 | Atlético Madrid | 1–0 | Rayo Vallecano | Madrid |
| 18:15 CEST (UTC+02:00) | Griezmann 55'; Kranevitter (yellow card) 68' | Report | Bebé (yellow card) 35' | Stadium: Vicente Calderón; Attendance: 49,263; Referee: José María Sánchez Martínez |

| 8 May 2016 37 | Real Sociedad | 2–1 | Rayo Vallecano | San Sebastián |
| 17:00 CEST (UTC+02:00) | Oyarzabal 12'; Prieto (yellow card) 28'; Bautista 50', (yellow card) 70'; Granero (red card) 76' | Report | Crespo (yellow card) 60'; Guerra 69' | Stadium: Anoeta; Attendance: 18,857; Referee: Santiago Jaime Latre |

| 15 May 2016 38 | Rayo Vallecano | 3–1 | Levante | Madrid |
| 19:00 CEST (UTC+02:00) | Hernández 12'; Trashorras 20'; Amaya (yellow card) 59'; Miku 73' | Report | Verza 60' (pen.), (yellow card) 90'; Navarro (yellow card) 63'; Deyverson (yellow card) 82' | Stadium: Vallecas; Attendance: 12,547; Referee: Carlos Clos Gómez |

== See also ==
2015–16 La Liga
