= Isaac Gómez =

Isaac Gómez may refer to:

- Isi (footballer, born October 1995), Spanish footballer
- Isaac Gomez (sprinter) (born 1934), Filipino sprinter
- Isaac Gómez (runner) (born 1976), Mexican distance runner
- Isaac Gómez (playwright)
