= Francisco Cerro =

Argentine footballer

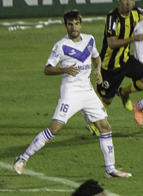

Personal information
- Full name: Francisco Cerro
- Date of birth: 9 February 1988 (age 38)
- Place of birth: Santiago del Estero, Argentina
- Height: 1.79 m (5 ft 10 in)
- Position: Midfielder

Team information
- Current team: Durazno

Youth career
- Quilmes

Senior career*
Years	Team	Apps	(Gls)
2008–2012	Quilmes	51	(2)
2011–2012	→ Vélez Sársfield (loan)	24	(0)
2012–2014	Vélez Sársfield	34	(1)
2014–2017	Racing Club	70	(0)
2017–2018	Rayo Vallecano	12	(0)
2018–2020	Defensa y Justicia	15	(0)
2020–2021	Central Córdoba	19	(0)
2021–2022	Aldosivi	31	(1)
2023–2025	Montevideo Wanderers	71	(1)
2026–	Durazno	0	(0)

International career
2012	Argentina	1	(0)
- * Club domestic league appearances and goals as of 14:45, 19 March 2026 (UTC)

Francisco Cerro (born 9 February 1988) is an Argentine footballer who plays for Uruguayan Primera División Amateur club Durazno as a midfielder.

== Club career ==
Cerro started his professional career in 2008 playing for Quilmes in the Primera B Nacional (Argentine second division). During the 2009–10 season, he helped Quilmes to obtain promotion to the Argentine Primera División. During his team's one-season stay in the Primera, Cerro played 23 games (9 in the 2010 Apertura and 14 in the 2011 Clausura), and scored two goals.

For the 2011–12 Argentine Primera División season, Cerro was loaned to Vélez Sársfield with a US$750,000 option to buy. He signed his contract with Vélez on August 4, 2011. Initially a substitute for Héctor Canteros, Cerro became a regular starter for the team during the 2012 Clausura and Copa Libertadores, playing 21 games during the semester.

The midfielder was eventually purchased by Vélez and started 13 games (scoring once) during Vélez's 2012 Inicial title-winning campaign.

After tough negotiations, on 5 February 2014 is confirmed as the new reinforcement Racing Club, following the purchase of 90% of his passes. On February 15, makes its official debut with the albiceleste jersey in the 1–0 defeat against San Lorenzo in the New Gasometer, entering halftime replaces José Luis Gómez. Despite the defeat, Pancho performed well in his debut, since that party has won the title and is one of the leaders of the team, providing strength and good play with the ball under his breath.

In 2014 champion is crowned Racing Club having played two matches (against Banfield and Olimpo of Bahia Blanca) after 13 years of waiting. Currently he has 27 games played goalless in Racing Club . In 2015 their current statistics are in the Libertadores Cup and played 4 games in the First Division of Argentina, has 14 games played.

On 18 July 2017, Cerro moved abroad for the first time in his career, signing for Segunda División club Rayo Vallecano. After earning promotion to La Liga and finishing as champions on his first season at Rayo, the club announced his departure from the club along with teammates Ernesto Galán and Diego Aguirre.

== International career ==
Cerro debuted for the Argentina national football team in 2012, playing a friendly against Brazil in a team formed exclusively with local league players.

== Honours ==
Vélez Sársfield

- Argentine Primera División: 2012 Inicial

Rayo Vallecano

- Segunda División: 2017–18
