= 2019–20 Rayo Vallecano season =

Rayo Vallecano
2019–20 season
- President: Raúl Martín Presa
- Head coach: Paco Jémez
- Stadium: Campo de Fútbol de Vallecas
- Segunda División: 7th
- Copa del Rey: Round of 16
- Top goalscorer: League: Leonardo Ulloa (6); All: Leonardo Ulloa (6)
Home colours	Away colours

The 2019–20 season was Rayo Vallecano's 95th season in existence and the club's first season back in the second division of Spanish football. In addition to the domestic league, Rayo Vallecano participated in this season's edition of the Copa del Rey. The season was slated to cover a period from 1 July 2019 to 30 June 2020. It was extended extraordinarily beyond 30 June due to the COVID-19 pandemic in Spain.

== Players ==
=== Current squad ===
As of 20 February 2020

Note: Flags indicate national team as defined under FIFA eligibility rules; some limited exceptions apply. Players may hold more than one non-FIFA nationality.

No.	Pos.	Nation	Player
1	GK	ESP	Alberto García (captain)
2	DF	ESP	Tito
3	DF	ESP	Saúl García (on loan from Alavés)
4	MF	ESP	Mario Suárez
5	DF	ESP	Alejandro Catena
6	MF	ESP	Santi Comesaña
7	FW	ARG	Leonardo Ulloa
8	FW	ARG	Óscar Trejo (vice-captain)
9	FW	ESP	Andrés Martín
10	FW	POR	Bebé
11	MF	ESP	Isi Palazón
12	FW	ESP	Jorge de Frutos (on loan from Real Madrid)
13	GK	MKD	Stole Dimitrievski

No.	Pos.	Nation	Player
14	FW	MAR	Yacine Qasmi
15	FW	ESP	Juan Villar (on loan from Osasuna)
16	DF	CRO	Antonio Milić (on loan from Anderlecht)
17	DF	PER	Luis Advíncula
18	MF	ESP	Álvaro García
19	DF	ESP	Antonio Luna (on loan from Levante)
20	DF	URU	Emiliano Velázquez
22	MF	ESP	José Ángel Pozo
23	MF	ESP	Óscar Valentín
24	DF	MNE	Esteban Saveljich
25	GK	ESP	Roberto Santamaría
28	MF	ESP	Joni Montiel

=== Out on loan ===
Note: Flags indicate national team as defined under FIFA eligibility rules; some limited exceptions apply. Players may hold more than one non-FIFA nationality.

No.	Pos.	Nation	Player
—	DF	ESP	Jordi Amat (at Eupen until 30 June 2020)
—	DF	ESP	Mario Hernández (at SS Reyes until 30 June 2020)
-	DF	SEN	Abdoulaye Ba (at Deportivo de La Coruña until 30 June 2020)
—	MF	GUI	Lass Bangoura (at Lugo until 30 June 2020)

No.	Pos.	Nation	Player
—	FW	ESP	Adrián Carrasco (at Ebro until 30 June 2020)
—	FW	ESP	Sergio Benito (at Cultural Leonesa until 30 June 2020)
—	FW	ESP	Sergio Moreno (at Valencia Mestalla until 30 June 2020)

== Pre-season and friendlies ==
Win Draw Loss

== Competitions ==
=== Overview ===
Competition	First match	Last match	Starting round	Final position	Record							
Competition	First match	Last match	Starting round	Final position	Pld	W	D	L	GF	GA	GD	Win %
Segunda División	17 August 2019	20 July 2020	Matchday 1	7th	42	13	21	8	60	50	+10	30.95
Copa del Rey	17 December 2019	29 January 2020	First round	Round of 16	4	2	1	1	5	4	+1	50.00
Total					46	15	22	9	65	54	+11	32.61

Source: Competitions

=== Segunda División ===
==== League table ====
Pos	Team	Pld	W	D	L	GF	GA	GD	Pts	Promotion, qualification or relegation
5	Girona	42	17	12	13	48	43	+5	63	Qualification to promotion play-offs
6	Elche (O, P)	42	16	13	13	52	44	+8	61	Qualification to promotion play-offs
7	Rayo Vallecano	42	13	21	8	60	50	+10	60 (Note: Rayo Vallecano finished ahead of Fuenlabrada on head-to-head points: Fuenlabrada 2–2 Rayo Vallecano, Rayo Vallecano 1–0 Fuenlabrada.)	
8	Fuenlabrada	42	15	15	12	47	40	+7	60	
9	Las Palmas	42	14	15	13	49	46	+3	57	

Source: LaLiga Soccerway
Rules for classification: 1) points; 2) head-to-head points; 3) head-to-head goal difference; 4) goal difference; 5) number of goals scored
(O) Play-off winners; (P) Promoted

==== Results summary ====
Overall								Home						Away					
Pld	W	D	L	GF	GA	GD	Pts	W	D	L	GF	GA	GD	W	D	L	GF	GA	GD
42	13	21	8	60	50	+10	60	9	9	3	29	21	+8	4	12	5	31	29	+2

Source: La Liga SmartBank

==== Results by round ====
Round	1	2	3	4	5	6	7	8	9	10	11	12	13	14	15	16	17	18	19	20	21	22	23	24	25	26	27	28	29	30	31	32	33	34	35	36	37	38	39	40	41	42
Ground	H	A	H	A	H	A	H	A	H	A	H	A	H	A	H	A	H	A	A	H	A	H	H	A	H	A	H	A	H	A	H	A	H	A	H	A	H	A	H	A	H	A
Result	D	D	W	L	W	D	D	D	D	D	W	W	L	L	D	D	L	L	W	W	D	W	W	D	D	D	D	D	W	D	L	D	W	D	D	L	D	W	W	L	D	W
Position	10	12	7	11	6	6	9	8	9	10	7	4	6	11	12	12	14	14	13	11	12	10	7	7	6	7	7	7	6	6	7	8	8	8	7	9	8	7	6	8	8	7

Source: La Liga SmartBank
A = Away; H = Home; W = Win; D = Draw; L = Loss

==== Matches ====
The fixtures were revealed on 4 July 2019.

17 August 2019 1	Rayo Vallecano	2–2	Mirandés	Madrid
21:00 CEST (UTC+2)		Report		Stadium: Vallecas

25 August 2019 2	Sporting Gijón	1–1	Rayo Vallecano	Gijón
18:00 CEST (UTC+2)		Report		Stadium: El Molinón

1 September 2019 3	Rayo Vallecano	3–1	Deportivo La Coruña	Madrid
18:00 CEST (UTC+2)		Report		Stadium: Vallecas

8 September 2019 4	Girona	3–1	Rayo Vallecano	Girona
16:00 CEST (UTC+2)		Report		Stadium: Montilivi

13 September 2019 5	Rayo Vallecano	2–0	Racing Santander	Madrid
21:00 CEST (UTC+2)	Martín Pascual (yellow card) 11' (yellow-red card) 30'; Saveljich 17'; Ulloa (yellow card) 40'; Luna (yellow card) 79'; Bebé 90+5'	Report	Nkaka (yellow card) 23' (yellow-red card) 34'	Stadium: Vallecas; Attendance: 9,450; Referee: Alejandro Muñiz Ruiz

17 September 2019 6	Málaga	1–1	Rayo Vallecano	Málaga
19:00 CEST (UTC+2)		Report		Stadium: La Rosaleda

21 September 2019 7	Rayo Vallecano	1–1	Almería	Madrid
20:00 CEST (UTC+2)		Report		Stadium: Vallecas

28 September 2019 8	Fuenlabrada	2–2	Rayo Vallecano	Fuenlabrada
16:00 CEST (UTC+2)		Report		Stadium: Fernando Torres

1 October 2019 9	Rayo Vallecano	1–1	Alcorcón	Madrid
21:00 CEST (UTC+2)		Report		Stadium: Vallecas

5 October 2019 10	Elche	1–1	Rayo Vallecano	Elche
18:00 CEST (UTC+2)		Report		Stadium: Martínez Valero

11 October 2019 11	Rayo Vallecano	2–1	Tenerife	Madrid
21:00 CEST (UTC+2)		Report		Stadium: Vallecas

19 October 2019 12	Extremadura	0–3	Rayo Vallecano	Almendralejo
20:00 CEST (UTC+2)		Report		Stadium: Ciudad de Almendralejo

26 October 2019 13	Rayo Vallecano	1–3	Ponferradina	Madrid
16:00 CEST (UTC+2)		Report		Stadium: Vallecas

3 November 2019 14	Lugo	1–0	Rayo Vallecano	Lugo
16:00 CET (UTC+1)		Report		Stadium: Anxo Carro

10 November 2019 15	Rayo Vallecano	1–1	Cádiz	Madrid
21:00 CET (UTC+1)	Trejo 74'	Report	Alejo 38'	Stadium: Campo de Fútbol de Vallecas; Attendance: 9,498; Referee: Javier Iglesias Villanueva

16 November 2019 16	Numancia	2–2	Rayo Vallecano	Soria
18:30 CET (UTC+1)		Report		Stadium: Los Pajaritos; Referee: Jorge Figueroa Vázquez

23 November 2019 17	Rayo Vallecano	0–1	Zaragoza	Madrid
16:00 CET (UTC+1)	Dimitrievski (yellow card) 61'; Pascual (yellow card) 63'	Report	Eguaras (yellow card) 40'; Ros 63' (pen.), (yellow card) 73'; Puado (yellow card) 71'; Guti (yellow card) 90+3'	Stadium: Vallecas; Attendance: 9,743; Referee: Óliver de la Fuente Ramos

1 December 2019 18	Oviedo	2–1	Rayo Vallecano	Oviedo
16:00 CET (UTC+1)		Report		Stadium: Carlos Tartiere

7 December 2019 19	Huesca	0–2	Rayo Vallecano	Huesca
16:00 CET (UTC+1)		Report		Stadium: El Alcoraz

21 December 2019 21	Las Palmas	1–1	Rayo Vallecano	Las Palmas
18:00 CET (UTC+1)		Report		Stadium: Gran Canaria

5 January 2020 22	Rayo Vallecano	1–0	Girona	Madrid
16:00 CET (UTC+1)		Report		Stadium: Vallecas

15 January 2020 23	Rayo Vallecano	1–0	Lugo	Madrid
20:00 CET (UTC+1)		Report		Stadium: Vallecas

18 January 2020 24	Ponferradina	1–1	Rayo Vallecano	Ponferrada
18:15 CET (UTC+1)		Report		Stadium: El Toralín

26 January 2020 25	Rayo Vallecano	1–1	Extremadura	Madrid
18:15 CET (UTC+1)		Report		Stadium: Vallecas

2 February 2020 26	Mirandés	0–0	Rayo Vallecano	Miranda de Ebro
18:15 CET (UTC+1)		Report		Stadium: Anduva

9 February 2020 27	Rayo Vallecano	1–1	Oviedo	Madrid
18:15 CET (UTC+1)		Report		Stadium: Vallecas

16 February 2020 28	Tenerife	0–0	Rayo Vallecano	Santa Cruz de Tenerife
20:30 CET (UTC+1)		Report		Stadium: Heliodoro Rodríguez López

23 February 2020 29	Rayo Vallecano	2–0	Huesca	Madrid
21:00 CET (UTC+1)	Suárez 55'; De Frutos 72'	Report		Stadium: Vallecas; Attendance: 7,754; Referee: Saúl Ais Reig

29 February 2020 30	Albacete	1–1	Rayo Vallecano	Albacete
20:30 CET (UTC+1)	Pedro 44'	Report	Qasmi 32'	Stadium: Carlos Belmonte; Attendance: 8,543; Referee: Jorge Figueroa Vázquez

8 March 2020 31	Rayo Vallecano	2–3	Elche	Madrid
12:00 CET (UTC+1)		Report		Stadium: Vallecas

10 June 2020 20	Rayo Vallecano	1–0	Albacete	Madrid
20:00 CEST (UTC+2)	Advíncula 61'	Report		Stadium: Vallecas; Attendance: 0 Referee: José Antonio López Toca

14 June 2020 32	Cádiz	1–1	Rayo Vallecano	Cádiz
21:30 CEST (UTC+2)	Álvaro 85'	Report	Trejo 52'	Stadium: Ramón de Carranza; Attendance: 0 Referee: Gorka Sagués Oscoz

17 June 2020 33	Rayo Vallecano	1–0	Fuenlabrada	Madrid
21:45 CEST (UTC+2)				Stadium: Vallecas; Attendance: 0

20 June 2020 34	Deportivo La Coruña	3–3	Rayo Vallecano	A Coruña
17:00 CEST (UTC+2)	Santos 50'; Mollejo 52'; Aketxe 89' (pen.)	Report	Villar 1', 21'; Suárez (yellow card) 57', (goal) 90+3' (pen.); Martín (yellow card) 81'; Dimitrievski (yellow card) 87'	Stadium: Abanca-Riazor; Attendance: 0 Referee: Iñaki Vicandi Garrido

25 June 2020 35	Rayo Vallecano	1–1	Sporting Gijón	Madrid
19:30 CEST (UTC+2)	Qasmi 76'; Villar (yellow card) 85'; Dimitrievski (yellow card) 90+4'	Report	Medina (yellow card) 19'; Vázquez 45+3', (yellow card) 77'; Salvador (yellow card) 60'	Stadium: Vallecas; Attendance: 0 Referee: Luis Mario Milla Alvendiz

29 June 2020 36	Alcorcón	3–2	Rayo Vallecano	Alcorcón
21:00 CEST (UTC+2)	Ernesto 22', 46'; Diéguez (yellow card) 40'; Arribas 70'; Bellvís (yellow card) 83'	Report	Luna (yellow card) 22'; Trejo (yellow card) 27', (goal) 75' (pen.); Isi 45+3'; Catena (yellow card) 68'; Advíncula (yellow card) 87'; De Frutos (yellow card) 90+4'	Stadium: Santo Domingo; Attendance: 0 Referee: Javier Iglesias Villanueva

2 July 2020 37	Rayo Vallecano	0–0	Málaga	Madrid
21:45 CEST (UTC+2)	Saveljich (yellow card) 19'; Valentín (yellow card) 29'; Luna (yellow card) 37'	Report	Juande (yellow card) 32'; Lombán (yellow card) 41'; Tete (yellow card) 65'; Juankar (yellow card) 81'	Stadium: Vallecas; Attendance: 0 Referee: Daniel Jesús Trujillo Suárez

6 July 2020 38	Zaragoza	2–4	Rayo Vallecano	Zaragoza
21:45 CEST (UTC+2)	Atienza 5'; Puado 60'; Delmás (yellow card) 87'; Soro (yellow card) 89'; Eguaras (yellow card) 89'; Pereira (yellow card) 90+1'	Report	Saúl (yellow card) 25'; Suárez (yellow card) 34'; Villar 45+2', 51'; García 54'; Advíncula (yellow card) 64'; Trejo (yellow card) 90+3', (goal) 90+4'	Stadium: La Romareda; Attendance: 0 Referee: Daniel Ocón Arráiz

9 July 2020 39	Rayo Vallecano	3–2	Numancia	Madrid
20:30 CEST (UTC+2)	Suárez 25' (pen.); Qasmi (yellow card) 28'; De Frutos 45+4'; Comesaña (yellow card) 57'; Villar 66' (pen.); Martín (yellow card) 78'	Report	Morán (yellow card) 54'; Escassi (yellow card) 54'; Higinio 57', (red card) 65'; Curro 72', (yellow card) 90+5'; Nacho (yellow card) 90+5'	Stadium: Vallecas; Attendance: 0 Referee: Iosu Galech Apezteguía

13 July 2020 40	Almería	3–2	Rayo Vallecano	Almería
19:30 CEST (UTC+2)	Lazo 9'; Núñez 20'; Muñoz 30'; Romera (yellow card) 69'; Francis (yellow card) 78'	Report	Advíncula (yellow card) 8'; Suárez (yellow card) 24'; Villar 51', 57', (yellow card) 81'	Stadium: Juegos Mediterráneos; Attendance: 0 Referee: Rubén Ávalos Barrera

17 July 2020 41	Rayo Vallecano	2–2	Las Palmas	Madrid
21:00 CEST (UTC+2)	Montiel 20', (yellow card) 34'; Qasmi (yellow card) 45+3'; Trejo (yellow card) 46', (goal) 49'; Isi (yellow card) 55'; García (yellow card) 80'; Dimitrievski (yellow card) 89'	Report	Lemos (yellow card) 24'; Suárez (yellow card) 26'; Castro 38' (pen.), 90' (pen.); Varela (yellow card) 83'	Stadium: Vallecas; Attendance: 0 Referee: Luis Mario Milla Alvendiz

20 July 2020 42	Racing Santander	1–2	Rayo Vallecano	Santander
21:00 CEST (UTC+2)	Siverio 44'	Report	García 50'; Suárez 63' (pen.)	Stadium: El Sardinero; Attendance: 0 Referee: Jon Ander González Esteban

=== Copa del Rey ===
17 December 2019 First round	Tarazona	0–1 (a.e.t.)	Rayo Vallecano	Tarazona
20:15 CET (UTC+1)		Report	Valentín 120+2'	Stadium: Municipal; Attendance: 2,000; Referee: Iosu Galech Apezteguía

12 January 2020 Second round	Barakaldo	0–2	Rayo Vallecano	Barakaldo
17:00 CET (UTC+1)		Report	Pozo 14'; Piovaccari 82'	Stadium: Lasesarre; Attendance: 5,000; Referee: Oliver De la Fuente Ramos

23 January 2020 Round of 32	Rayo Vallecano	2–2 (a.e.t.) (4–2 p)	Real Betis	Madrid
21:00 CET (UTC+1)	Montiel (yellow card) 26'; Catena 47', (yellow card) 62'; Valentín (yellow card) 58'; Trejo (yellow card) 58'; Suárez (yellow card) 108'; Saúl (yellow card) 113'; Martín 118'	Report	Aleñá (yellow card) 38'; Bartra (yellow card) 63'; Joaquín 84'; Feddal (yellow card) 94'; Loren 97'; Tello (yellow card) 114'	Stadium: Vallecas; Attendance: 11,800; Referee: Ricardo de Burgos Bengoetxea
	Penalties
	Suárez (penalty scored); Pozo (penalty scored); Saúl (penalty scored); Catena (penalty scored)		(penalty missed) Joaquín; (penalty scored) Loren; (penalty scored) Aleñá; (penalty missed) Tello

29 January 2020 Round of 16	Rayo Vallecano	0–2	Villarreal	Madrid
19:00 CET (UTC+1)	Milić (yellow card) 28'	Report	Funes Mori (yellow card) 25'; Cazorla (yellow card) 80', (goal) 85'; Niño 84'	Stadium: Vallecas; Attendance: 7,500; Referee: Eduardo Prieto Iglesias
