= Santi Comesaña =

Spanish footballer

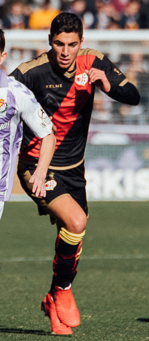
- Comesaña with Rayo Vallecano in 2019

Personal information
- Full name: Santiago Comesaña Veiga
- Date of birth: 5 October 1996 (age 30)
- Place of birth: Vigo, Spain
- Height: 1.84 m (6 ft 0 in)
- Position: Central midfielder

Team information
- Current team: Villarreal
- Number: 14

Youth career
- Val Miñor

Senior career*
Years	Team	Apps	(Gls)
2015–2016	Coruxo	37	(8)
2016–2023	Rayo Vallecano	201	(13)
2023–	Villarreal	102	(9)
- * Club domestic league appearances and goals as of 18 September 2026

Santiago "Santi" Comesaña Veiga (born 5 October 1996) is a Spanish professional footballer who plays as a central midfielder for La Liga club Villarreal.

== Career ==
=== Coruxo ===
Born in Vigo, Galicia, Comesaña was an ED Val Miñor youth graduate. On 9 July 2015, he signed for Segunda División B side Coruxo FC, after impressing on a trial basis.

On 22 August 2015, Comesaña made his senior debut, starting and scoring his team's second in a 3–2 away win against Atlético Astorga FC. On 6 December, he scored a hat-trick in a 5–1 home routing of SD Compostela.

=== Rayo Vallecano ===
On 16 July 2016, after scoring eight goals in 37 matches during the campaign, Comesaña signed a four-year contract with Rayo Vallecano, freshly relegated to Segunda División. He made his professional debut on 28 August, coming on as a second-half substitute for Adri Embarba in a 0–0 home draw against Real Valladolid.

Comesaña scored his first professional goal on 1 April 2017, netting the first in a 3–1 away win against Girona FC. He renewed his contract until 2023 on 17 October, contributed with two goals in 33 appearances during the 2017–18 campaign, as his side achieved promotion to La Liga as champions.

Comesaña made his debut in the main category of Spanish football on 25 August 2018, starting in a 1–0 away loss against Atlético Madrid. He scored his first goal in the category on 20 January 2019, netting the opener in a 2–2 home draw against Real Sociedad.

=== Villarreal ===
On 29 June 2023, Comesaña signed a four-year contract with Villarreal CF also in the top tier.

== Career statistics ==
=== Club ===
As of match played 18 September 2026

Appearances and goals by club, season and competition
Club	Season	League			Copa del Rey		Europe		Other		Total	
Club	Season	Division	Apps	Goals	Apps	Goals	Apps	Goals	Apps	Goals	Apps	Goals
Coruxo	2015–16	Segunda División B	37	8	0	0	—		—		37	8
Rayo Vallecano	2016–17	Segunda División	17	2	1	0	—		—		18	2
Rayo Vallecano	2017–18	Segunda División	33	2	0	0	—		—		33	2
Rayo Vallecano	2018–19	La Liga	25	1	0	0	—		—		25	1
Rayo Vallecano	2019–20	Segunda División	21	1	0	0	—		—		21	1
Rayo Vallecano	2020–21	Segunda División	35	3	4	0	—		4 (Note: Appearances in Segunda División play-offs)	0	43	3
Rayo Vallecano	2021–22	La Liga	35	1	6	0	—		—		41	1
Rayo Vallecano	2022–23	La Liga	35	3	3	0	—		—		38	3
Rayo Vallecano	Total		201	13	14	0	—		4	0	219	13
Villarreal	2023–24	La Liga	27	2	3	0	7 (Note: Appearances in UEFA Europa League)	1	—		37	3
Villarreal	2024–25	La Liga	35	4	2	0	—		—		37	4
Villarreal	2025–26	La Liga	34	3	2	1	8 (Note: Appearances in UEFA Champions League)	1	—		44	5
Villarreal	2026–27	La Liga	6	0	0	0	1	0	—		7	0
Villarreal	Total		102	9	7	1	16	2	—		125	12
Career total			340	22	21	1	16	2	4	0	381	33

== Honours ==
Rayo Vallecano

- Segunda División: 2017–18
