= Chechu Dorado =

Spanish footballer (born 1982)

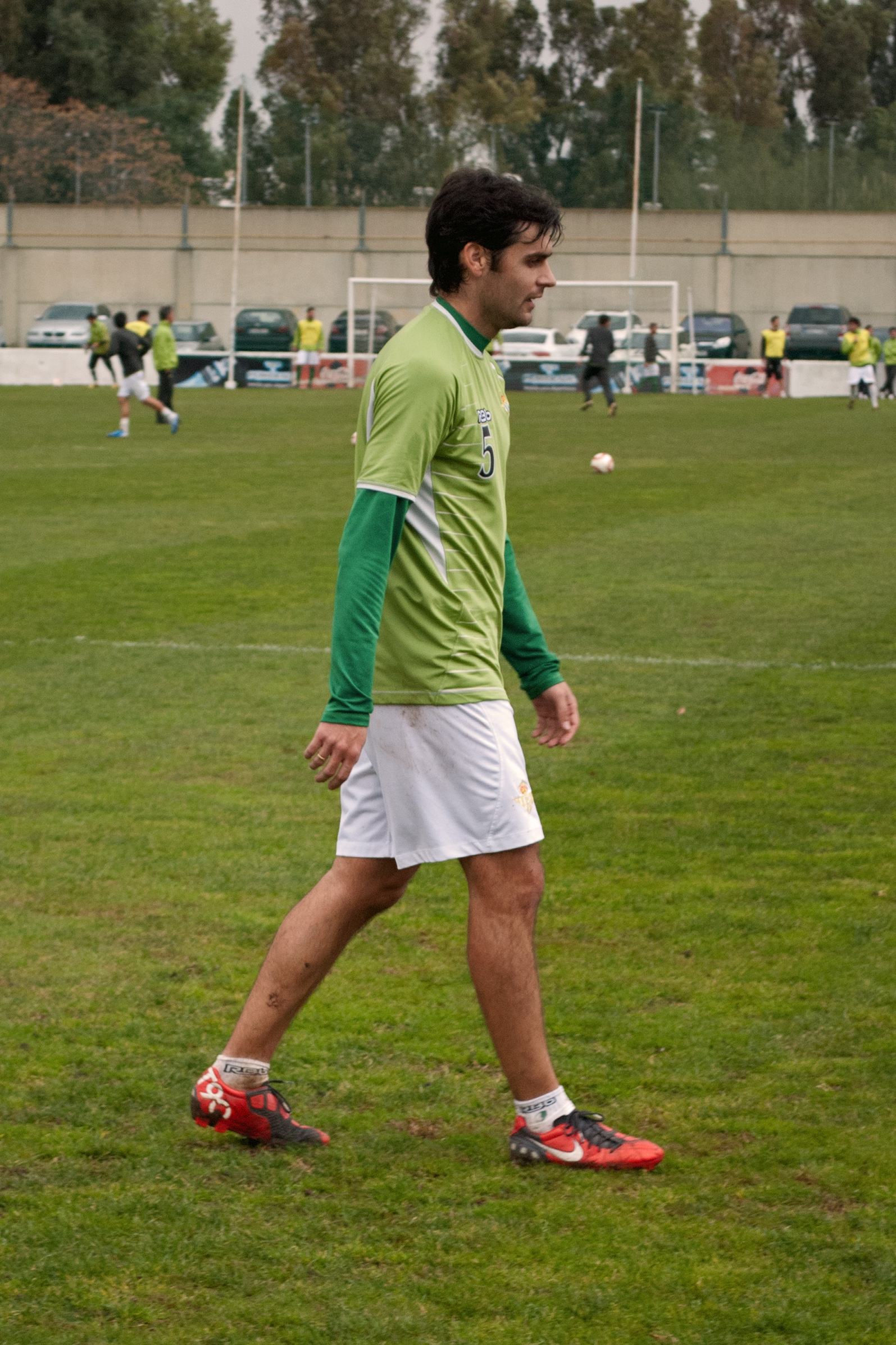
- Dorado training with Betis in 2010

Personal information
- Full name: José Antonio Dorado Ramírez
- Date of birth: 10 July 1982 (age 44)
- Place of birth: Córdoba, Spain
- Height: 1.80 m (5 ft 11 in)
- Position: Centre-back

Youth career
- 1997–1998: Córdoba
- 1998–2000: Zaragoza

Senior career*
Years	Team	Apps	(Gls)
2000–2004	Zaragoza B	132	(0)
2004–2007	Lleida	79	(1)
2007–2010	Huesca	116	(1)
2010–2013	Betis	73	(3)
2013–2015	Villarreal	45	(0)
2015–2019	Rayo Vallecano	72	(1)
2019	Zaragoza	8	(0)
2019–2022	Ejea	80	(0)
Total		605	(6)
- * Club domestic league appearances and goals

José Antonio 'Chechu' Dorado Ramírez (born 10 July 1982) is a Spanish former professional footballer who played as a central defender.

== Club career ==
Born in Córdoba, Andalusia, Dorado alternated between Segunda División and Segunda División B until the age of 29. He started his senior career with Deportivo Aragón, then went on to represent UE Lleida, SD Huesca and Real Betis.

Dorado scored two goals in 33 games in the 2010–11 season to help the latter club to return to La Liga as champions, after a two-year absence. He made his debut in the competition on 27 August 2011, playing the full 90 minutes in a 1–0 derby away victory over Granada CF. He contributed 2,890 minutes during the campaign as they retained their status, scoring his only goal in the Spanish top flight on 31 March 2012 in another match against a team from his native region, Málaga CF (2–0 away win).

On 22 January 2013, Dorado returned to the second division, joining Villarreal CF. He started in all his 11 league appearances in his first year, going on to achieve another promotion.

On 6 July 2015, Dorado signed a two-year deal with Rayo Vallecano after his contract expired. He scored once from 38 matches in 2017–18, as the side returned to the top tier after the first-place finish.

In January 2019, the 36-year-old Dorado moved to Real Zaragoza. On 13 July that year, he agreed to a contract at third-division SD Ejea.

== Career statistics ==
As of match played 13 March 2021

Appearances and goals by club, season and competition
Club	Season	League			National Cup		Continental		Other		Total	
Club	Season	Division	Apps	Goals	Apps	Goals	Apps	Goals	Apps	Goals	Apps	Goals
Zaragoza B	2000–01	Segunda División B	36	0	—		—		—		36	0
Zaragoza B	2001–02	Segunda División B	24	0	—		—		—		24	0
Zaragoza B	2002–03	Segunda División B	38	0	—		—		—		38	0
Zaragoza B	2003–04	Segunda División B	34	0	—		—		—		34	0
Zaragoza B	Total		132	0	0	0	0	0	0	0	132	0
Lleida	2004–05	Segunda División	27	0	2	0	—		—		29	0
Lleida	2005–06	Segunda División	15	0	3	0	—		—		18	0
Lleida	2006–07	Segunda División	37	1	0	0	—		—		37	1
Lleida	Total		79	1	5	0	0	0	0	0	84	1
Huesca	2007–08	Segunda División B	36	1	2	0	—		3 (Note: Appearances in Segunda División B play-offs)	0	41	1
Huesca	2008–09	Segunda División	39	0	0	0	—		—		39	0
Huesca	2009–10	Segunda División	41	0	0	0	—		—		41	0
Huesca	Total		116	1	2	0	0	0	3	0	121	1
Betis	2010–11	Segunda División	33	2	5	0	—		—		38	2
Betis	2011–12	La Liga	33	1	1	0	—		—		34	1
Betis	2012–13	La Liga	7	0	2	0	—		—		9	0
Betis	Total		73	3	8	0	0	0	0	0	81	3
Villarreal	2012–13	Segunda División	11	0	0	0	—		—		11	0
Villarreal	2013–14	La Liga	19	0	2	0	—		—		21	0
Villarreal	2014–15	La Liga	15	0	6	0	3 (Note: Appearances in UEFA Europa League)	0	—		24	0
Villarreal	Total		45	0	8	0	3	0	0	0	56	0
Rayo Vallecano	2015–16	La Liga	10	0	4	0	—		—		14	0
Rayo Vallecano	2016–17	Segunda División	23	0	1	0	—		—		24	0
Rayo Vallecano	2017–18	Segunda División	38	1	0	0	—		—		38	1
Rayo Vallecano	2018–19	La Liga	1	0	2	0	—		—		3	0
Rayo Vallecano	Total		72	1	7	0	0	0	0	0	79	1
Zaragoza	2018–19	Segunda División	8	0	0	0	—		—		8	0
Ejea	2019–20	Segunda División B	24	0	0	0	—		—		24	0
Ejea	2020–21	Segunda División B	16	0	0	0	—		—		16	0
Ejea	Total		40	0	0	0	0	0	0	0	40	0
Career total			565	6	30	0	3	0	3	0	601	6

== Honours ==
Betis

- Segunda División: 2010–11

Rayo Vallecano

- Segunda División: 2017–18
