= Toño (footballer, born 1979) =

Spanish footballer

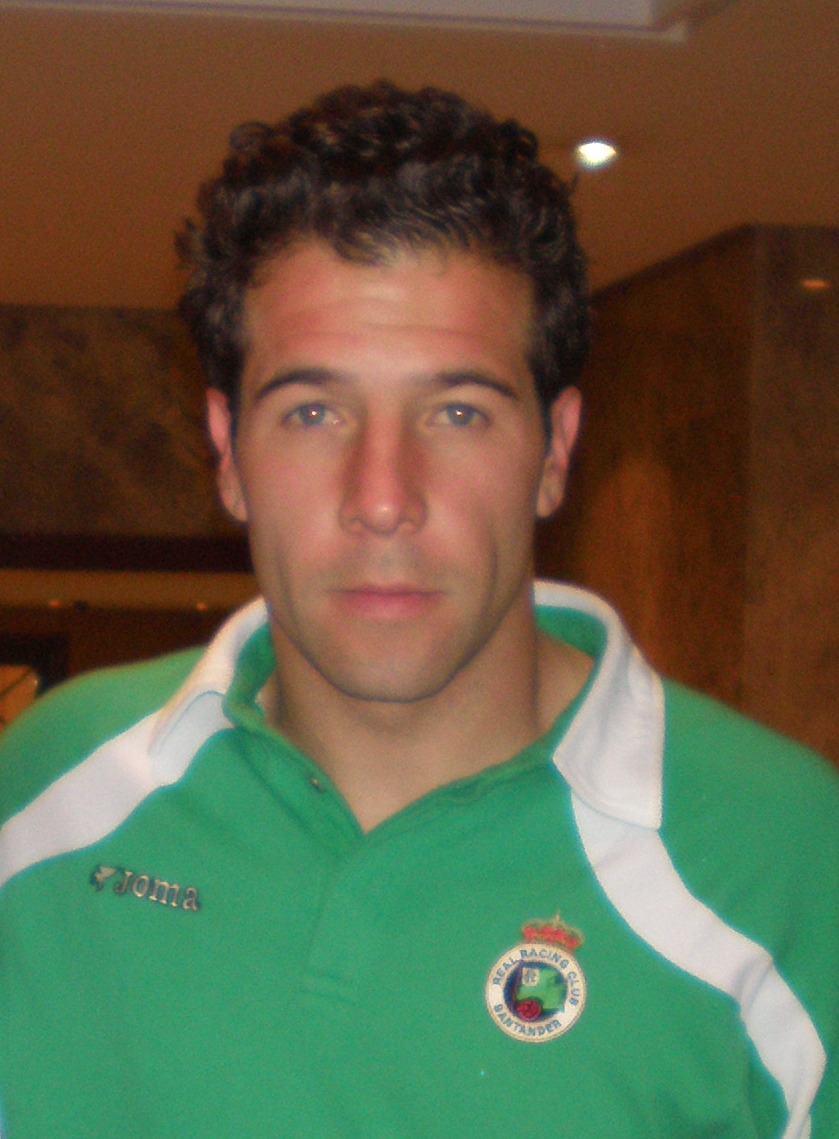
- Toño with Racing Santander in 2008

Personal information
- Full name: Antonio Rodríguez Martínez
- Date of birth: 17 December 1979 (age 46)
- Place of birth: Alicante, Spain
- Height: 1.82 m (6 ft 0 in)
- Position: Goalkeeper

Youth career
- Betis Florida
- Hércules

Senior career*
Years	Team	Apps	(Gls)
1998–1999	Hércules B		
1999–2003	Hércules	57	(0)
2003–2004	Recreativo	49	(0)
2005–2012	Racing Santander	177	(0)
2006	→ Recreativo (loan)	19	(0)
2012–2013	Granada	24	(0)
2013–2014	Elche	9	(0)
2014–2017	Rayo Vallecano	39	(0)
Total		374	(0)
- * Club domestic league appearances and goals

Antonio Rodríguez Martínez (born 17 December 1979), known as Toño (Spanish pronunciation: [ˈtoɲo]), is a Spanish former professional footballer who played as a goalkeeper.

He spent most of his career with Racing de Santander, appearing in 183 competitive matches over seven seasons. In La Liga, he also represented Granada, Elche and Rayo Vallecano.

== Club career ==
Toño was born in Alicante, Valencian Community. After making his professional debut with his hometown club Hércules CF, he joined Recreativo de Huelva (Segunda División) for the 2003–04 season, signing with La Liga side Racing de Santander in January 2005 but returning to Huelva on loan exactly one year later; during both his spells in Andalusia, he had an interesting battle for first-choice status with José Antonio Luque.

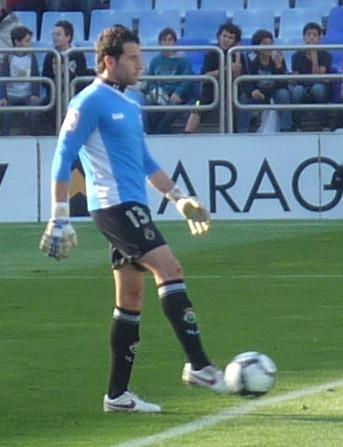
Toño in action for Racing Santander in 2009

In the following years, Toño was the undisputed first-choice. In the 2007–08 campaign, when his team achieved a first-ever qualification for the UEFA Cup, he finished second to Iker Casillas in the Ricardo Zamora Trophy race, an award which he had already won in his debut season with Recre.

Toño begun 2009–10 again as starter. On 28 February 2010, however, he suffered a leg injury as the Cantabrians lost 2–0 at home against UD Almería, and would be sidelined for more than two months, although he would be reinstated for the final two games as Racing narrowly avoided relegation, including the decisive 2–0 home win over Sporting de Gijón.

After leaving Santander in the summer of 2012, Toño continued competing in the top division by representing Granada CF and Elche CF. On 22 August 2014, he terminated his contract with the latter and moved to Rayo Vallecano in the same league on 1 September.

In March 2018, the 38-year-old Toño announced his retirement due to recurrent physical problems.

== Career statistics ==
Appearances and goals by club, season and competition
Club	Season	League			Cup		Europe		Other		Total	
Club	Season	Division	Apps	Goals	Apps	Goals	Apps	Goals	Apps	Goals	Apps	Goals
Hércules	1999–2000	Segunda División B	0	0	2	0	—		2 (Note: Appearances in Segunda División B play-offs)	0	4	0
Hércules	2000–01	Segunda División B	12	0	1	0	—		—		13	0
Hércules	2001–02	Segunda División B	18	0	—		—		5	0	23	0
Hércules	2002–03	Segunda División B	27	0	1	0	—		—		28	0
Hércules	Total		57	0	4	0	—		7	0	68	0
Recreativo	2003–04	Segunda División	28	0	1	0	—		—		29	0
Recreativo	2004–05	Segunda División	21	0	2	0	—		—		23	0
Recreativo	Total		49	0	3	0	—		—		52	0
Racing Santander	2004–05	La Liga	1	0	—		—		—		1	0
Racing Santander	2005–06	La Liga	0	0	1	0	—		—		1	0
Racing Santander	2006–07	La Liga	32	0	0	0	—		—		32	0
Racing Santander	2007–08	La Liga	32	0	1	0	—		—		33	0
Racing Santander	2008–09	La Liga	34	0	1	0	3 (Note: Appearances in UEFA Cup)	0	—		38	0
Racing Santander	2009–10	La Liga	16	0	0	0	—		—		16	0
Racing Santander	2010–11	La Liga	37	0	0	0	—		—		37	0
Racing Santander	2011–12	La Liga	25	0	0	0	—		—		25	0
Racing Santander	Total		177	0	3	0	3	0	—		183	0
Recreativo (loan)	2005–06	Segunda División	19	0	—		—		—		19	0
Granada	2012–13	La Liga	24	0	0	0	—		—		24	0
Elche	2013–14	La Liga	9	0	2	0	—		—		11	0
Rayo Vallecano	2014–15	La Liga	21	0	0	0	—		—		21	0
Rayo Vallecano	2015–16	La Liga	10	0	0	0	—		—		10	0
Rayo Vallecano	2016–17	Segunda División	8	0	0	0	—		—		8	0
Rayo Vallecano	2017–18	Segunda División	0	0	0	0	—		—		0	0
Rayo Vallecano	Total		39	0	0	0	—		—		39	0
Career Total			374	0	12	0	3	0	7	0	396	0

== Honours ==
Recreativo

- Segunda División: 2005–06

Individual

- Ricardo Zamora Trophy: 2003–04 (Segunda División)
