= Samu Becerra =

Spanish footballer

Personal information
- Full name: Samuel Becerra Gómez
- Date of birth: 1 June 2006 (age 20)
- Place of birth: Madrid, Spain
- Position: Attacking midfielder

Team information
- Current team: Rayo Vallecano B
- Number: 10

Youth career
- SS Reyes
- 2018–2024: Rayo Vallecano

Senior career*
Years	Team	Apps	(Gls)
2023–	Rayo Vallecano B	63	(7)
2025–	Rayo Vallecano	3	(0)
- * Club domestic league appearances and goals as of 16 May 2026

Samuel "Samu" Becerra Gómez (born 1 June 2006) is a Spanish professional footballer who plays as an attacking midfielder for Rayo Vallecano B.

== Career ==
Born in Madrid, Becerra joined Rayo Vallecano's youth sides in 2018, from neighbouring UD San Sebastián de los Reyes. On 21 August 2022, while still a youth, he signed a professional contract with the club.

Becerra made his senior debut with the reserves on 9 September 2023, coming on as a second-half substitute in a 1–1 Tercera Federación home draw against AD Parla. He scored his first goal for the side roughly one year later, in a 3–0 home win over the same opponent, and added a further four goals with during the season as the B's achieved promotion to Segunda Federación.

On 18 July 2025, Becerra renewed his contract with Rayo, and spent the entire pre-season with the main squad. He made his professional – and La Liga – debut on 14 September, replacing Pedro Díaz late into a 2–0 away loss to CA Osasuna.

== Career statistics ==
As of match played 3 May 2026

Appearances and goals by club, season and competition
Club	Season	League			National cup		Other		Other		Total	
Club	Season	Division	Apps	Goals	Apps	Goals	Apps	Goals	Apps	Goals	Apps	Goals
Rayo Vallecano B	2024–25	Tercera Federación	41	5	—		—		5 (Note: Appearances in 2025 Tercera Federación play-offs)	0	45	5
Rayo Vallecano B	2025–26	Segunda Federación	22	2	—		—		—		22	2
Rayo Vallecano B	Total		63	7	—		—		5	0	68	7
Rayo Vallecano	2025–26	La Liga	3	0	2	0	1 (Note: Appearance in UEFA Conference League)	0	—		6	0
Career total			66	7	2	0	1	0	5	0	74	7
