= Jesús Diego Cota =

Spanish association football player

Personal information
- Full name: Jesús Diego Cota
- Date of birth: 28 July 1967 (age 59)
- Place of birth: Madrid, Spain
- Height: 1.70 m (5 ft 7 in)
- Position: Right back

Youth career
- Rayo Vallecano

Senior career*
Years	Team	Apps	(Gls)
1984–1985	Rayo Vallecano B		
1985–2002	Rayo Vallecano	402	(5)
1986–1987	→ Pegaso (loan)	36	(0)
Total		438	(5)

International career
1985	Spain U21	3	(0)
- * Club domestic league appearances and goals

Jesús Diego Cota (born 28 July 1967), known as just Cota, is a Spanish footballer who last played as a defender for Rayo Vallecano.

== Club career ==
Born in Madrid, Cota was a youth graduate of Rayo Vallecano. After playing with the reserves, he made his first team debut on 17 March 1985, starting in a 1–0 Segunda División B home win over CD Alcoyano.

After only one Copa del Rey appearance in the entire 1985–86 season, Cota spent the 1986–87 campaign on loan at Tercera División side CD Pegaso. Upon returning, he only became a regular starter for Rayo during the 1988–89 season, as the club achieved promotion to La Liga.

Cota made his top tier debut on 29 October 1989, playing the full 90 minutes in a 3–0 home loss to Real Sociedad. He continued to feature regularly for the side in the following years, suffering three relegations and achieving three promotions, being also a team captain.

Cota was still a first-choice during the 1999–2000 season, as Rayo achieved a UEFA Cup spot due to the fair play award. He played in both the club's wins over Andorran side Constel·lació Esportiva, before breaking his tibia in the second leg and being sidelined for the entire 2000–01 campaign.

Cota retired in 2002, aged 35, after playing 402 league matches for Rayo.
