= Diego Aguirre (Spanish footballer) =

Spanish footballer (born 1990)

Personal information
- Full name: Diego Aguirre Parra
- Date of birth: 17 October 1990 (age 36)
- Place of birth: Toledo, Spain
- Height: 1.74 m (5 ft 9 in)
- Positions: Winger; left-back

Team information
- Current team: Manchego

Youth career
- Toledo

Senior career*
Years	Team	Apps	(Gls)
2009–2011	Toledo B	41	(9)
2011–2014	Toledo	58	(7)
2014–2018	Rayo Vallecano	37	(3)
2014–2015	→ Leganés (loan)	36	(2)
2015–2016	→ Oviedo (loan)	24	(0)
2018–2019	Zaragoza	20	(0)
2019–2021	Apollon Limassol	25	(1)
2021	Numancia	12	(0)
2021–2022	Deportivo La Coruña	18	(0)
2022–2023	Fuenlabrada	35	(0)
2023	Manchego	13	(2)
2024	Zamora	12	(0)
2025–	Manchego	0	(0)
- * Club domestic league appearances and goals as of 2 November 2025

Diego Aguirre Parra (Spanish pronunciation: [ˈdjeɣo aˈɣire ˈpara]; born 17 October 1990) is a Spanish footballer who plays as a left winger or left-back for Tercera Federación club Manchego.

== Club career ==
Aguirre was born in Toledo, Castilla-La Mancha. He finished his formation in CD Toledo's youth ranks, and made his senior debuts with the reserves in the 2009–10 campaign, playing in the regional leagues.

On 5 December 2010 Aguirre made his first-team debut, coming on as a second-half substitute in a 0–0 draw at Manzanares CF in the Tercera División. He scored his first goal on 9 January of the following year, netting the last of a 4–0 home win against CP Villarrobledo.

On 19 July 2012, after appearing regularly with Toledo and being relegated back to the fourth level, Aguirre signed a new deal with the club. He remained as a starter in the following two campaigns, scoring 13 goals in both seasons combined.

On 11 June 2014 Aguirre signed a three-year deal with La Liga side Rayo Vallecano. He was officially presented on 15 July, along with Derek Boateng.

On 29 August 2014 Aguirre was loaned to CD Leganés, newly promoted to the Segunda División, in a season-long deal. He played his first match as a professional two days later, replacing Carlos Álvarez in the 62nd minute of a 0–2 away loss against UE Llagostera.

On 12 October 2014 Aguirre scored his first professional goal, netting the first in a 1–2 away loss against Sporting de Gijón. On 26 August 2015 he was loaned to Real Oviedo also in the second tier, for one year.

Returning to Rayo in July 2016, Aguirre contributed with three goals in 19 appearances during the 2017–18 campaign as his side achieved a top-tier promotion. On 12 June 2018, he signed a three-year contract with second division side Real Zaragoza.

On 7 June 2019, Zaragoza reached an agreement with Apollon Limassol for the transfer of Aguirre.

== Career statistics ==
=== Club ===
As of match played 21 March 2021

Appearances and goals by club, season and competition
Club	Season	League			National Cup		Continental		Other		Total	
Club	Season	Division	Apps	Goals	Apps	Goals	Apps	Goals	Apps	Goals	Apps	Goals
Toledo	2011–12	Segunda División B	23	1	0	0	—		—		23	1
Toledo	2012–13	Tercera División	2	0	0	0	—		—		2	0
Toledo	2013–14	Segunda División B	33	6	1	0	—		2 (Note: Appearance(s) in Promotion Playoffs)	0	36	6
Toledo	Total		58	7	1	0	0	0	2	0	61	7
Rayo Vallecano	2015–16	La Liga	0	0	0	0	—		—		0	0
Rayo Vallecano	2016–17	Segunda División	18	0	1	2	—		—		19	2
Rayo Vallecano	2017–18	Segunda División	19	3	1	0	—		—		20	3
Rayo Vallecano	Total		37	3	2	2	0	0	0	0	39	5
Leganés (loan)	2014–15	Segunda División	36	2	1	0	—		—		37	2
Oviedo (loan)	2015–16	Segunda División	24	0	2	0	—		—		26	0
Zaragoza	2018–19	Segunda División	20	0	2	0	—		—		22	0
Apollon Limassol	2019–20	Cypriot First Division	18	1	2	0	8 (Note: Appearance(s) in UEFA Europa League)	0	—		28	1
Apollon Limassol	2020–21	Cypriot First Division	7	0	0	0	3	0	—		10	0
Apollon Limassol	Total		25	1	2	0	11	0	0	0	38	1
Numancia	2020–21	Segunda División B	7	0	0	0	—		—		7	0
Career total			207	13	10	2	11	0	2	0	230	15

== Honours ==
Rayo Vallecano

- Segunda División: 2017–18
