= Quini (footballer, born 1989) =

Spanish footballer

Personal information
- Full name: Joaquín José Marín Ruiz
- Date of birth: 24 September 1989 (age 37)
- Place of birth: Fernán Núñez, Spain
- Height: 1.78 m (5 ft 10 in)
- Position: Right-back

Youth career
- Séneca

Senior career*
Years	Team	Apps	(Gls)
2008–2010	Aguilarense	14	(7)
2010–2011	San Roque	0	(0)
2010–2011	→ Antequera (loan)	37	(9)
2011–2012	Lucena	34	(9)
2012–2014	Real Madrid B	40	(1)
2014–2017	Rayo Vallecano	71	(0)
2017–2023	Granada	138	(2)
2023–2024	Olympiacos	21	(2)
2024–2026	Atromitos	46	(0)
- * Club domestic league appearances and goals as of 21:26, 9 July 2026 (UTC)

Joaquín José Marín Ruiz (born 24 September 1989), known as Quini (Spanish pronunciation: [ˈkini]), is a Spanish professional footballer who plays as a right-back.

== Club career ==
Born in Fernán Núñez, Córdoba, Quini spent his first years as a senior competing in amateur football, as a striker. In the 2011–12 season he made his debut as a professional, appearing and scoring regularly for local Lucena CF in the Segunda División B, now playing as a winger.

Quini joined Real Madrid Castilla of Segunda División on 12 June 2012, penning a two-year contract. He made his league debut on 25 August, playing ten minutes in a 3–2 home win against FC Barcelona B. He was also successfully reconverted as right-back by manager Manolo Díaz during the 2013–14 campaign.

On 11 June 2014, Quini signed a three-year deal with La Liga club Rayo Vallecano. He played his first match in the Spanish top flight on 25 August, featuring the entire 0–0 home draw with Atlético Madrid.

Quini joined Granada CF for three seasons on 28 June 2017, after his contract expired. He contributed 31 appearances and one goal in his second, in a return to the top tier as runners-up.

Quini spent the vast majority of 2019–20 on the sidelines, due to a knee injury. He achieved another promotion to the main division in 2023, totalling 31 games for the champions.

In July 2023, the 33-year-old Quini moved abroad for the first time in his career, agreeing to a deal at Olympiacos F.C. as a free agent. He scored his first Super League Greece goal on 27 August, closing the 4–0 home victory over Atromitos FC.

On 9 July 2024, Quini was announced at Atromitos.

== Career statistics ==
As of match played 29 May 2024

Appearances and goals by club, season and competition
Club	Season	League			National cup		Continental		Other		Total	
Club	Season	Division	Apps	Goals	Apps	Goals	Apps	Goals	Apps	Goals	Apps	Goals
Aguilarense	2008–09	Primera Andaluza	7	2	—		—		—		7	2
Aguilarense	2009–10	Primera Andaluza	7	5	—		—		—		7	5
Aguilarense	Total		14	7	0	0	0	0	0	0	14	7
Antequera (loan)	2009–10	Tercera División	8	0	—		—		—		8	0
Antequera (loan)	2010–11	Tercera División	29	9	—		—		—		29	9
Antequera (loan)	Total		37	9	0	0	0	0	0	0	37	9
Lucena	2011–12	Segunda División B	34	9	0	0	—		4 (Note: Appearances in Segunda División B promotion playoffs)	0	38	9
Real Madrid B	2012–13	Segunda División	9	0	—		—		—		9	0
Real Madrid B	2013–14	Segunda División	31	1	—		—		—		31	1
Real Madrid B	Total		40	1	0	0	0	0	0	0	40	1
Rayo Vallecano	2014–15	La Liga	17	0	1	0	—		—		18	0
Rayo Vallecano	2015–16	La Liga	27	0	4	0	—		—		31	0
Rayo Vallecano	2016–17	Segunda División	27	0	1	0	—		—		28	0
Rayo Vallecano	Total		71	0	6	0	0	0	0	0	77	0
Granada	2017–18	Segunda División	15	0	1	0	—		—		16	0
Granada	2018–19	Segunda División	31	1	1	0	—		—		32	1
Granada	2019–20	La Liga	10	0	0	0	—		—		10	0
Granada	2020–21	La Liga	19	1	2	0	0	0	—		21	1
Granada	2021–22	La Liga	32	0	0	0	—		—		32	0
Granada	2022–23	Segunda División	31	0	1	0	—		—		32	0
Granada	Total		138	2	5	0	0	0	0	0	143	2
Olympiacos	2023–24	Super League Greece	21	2	1	0	11 (Note: Seven appearances in UEFA Europa League, four appearances in UEFA Conference League)	0	—		33	2
Career total			355	30	12	0	11	0	4	0	382	30

== Honours ==
Granada

- Segunda División: 2022–23

Olympiacos

- UEFA Conference League: 2023–24
