= Isi (footballer, born October 1995) =

Spanish footballer

Personal information
- Full name: Isaac Gómez Sánchez
- Date of birth: 28 October 1995 (age 31)
- Place of birth: Madrid, Spain
- Height: 1.71 m (5 ft 7 in)
- Position: Midfielder

Team information
- Current team: Murcia
- Number: 10

Youth career
- 2004–2008: Atlético Madrid
- 2008–2013: Rayo Vallecano

Senior career*
Years	Team	Apps	(Gls)
2013	Rayo Vallecano	1	(0)
2013–2016	Rayo Vallecano B	52	(5)
2016–2017	Fuenlabrada	20	(0)
2017–2020	Granada B	72	(3)
2020–2021	Melilla	17	(1)
2021–2022	Badajoz	30	(0)
2022–2023	Deportivo La Coruña	27	(0)
2023–	Murcia	73	(2)
- * Club domestic league appearances and goals as of 10 June 2026

Isaac Gómez Sánchez (born 28 October 1995), commonly known as Isi, is a Spanish footballer who plays as a midfielder for Real Murcia.

== Club career ==
Born in Madrid, Isi played in local Rayo Vallecano's every youth team. He was promoted to the under-19 side for the 2012–13 season.

On 17 March 2013, without even having appeared for the reserves, Isi was called up by first-team manager Paco Jémez for a La Liga away game against FC Barcelona, starting on the bench and being assigned number 39: with the game at 3–1 for the hosts he entered the field in the 85th minute, thus becoming the club's youngest player ever to appear in an official match at the age of 17 years and 140 days. During most of his spell, however, he was associated with the B side, competing in both Segunda División B and Tercera División.

On 11 August 2016, Isi signed for CF Fuenlabrada in the third division. He continued competing at that level the following years, with Club Recreativo Granada, UD Melilla, CD Badajoz, Deportivo de La Coruña and Real Murcia CF. While at the latter, he endured a lengthy spell on the sidelines due to an ankle injury.

== Personal life ==
Isi's second cousin, Adri Embarba, is also a footballer. A winger, he too played for Rayo.
