= Lass Bangoura =

Guinean footballer (born 1992)

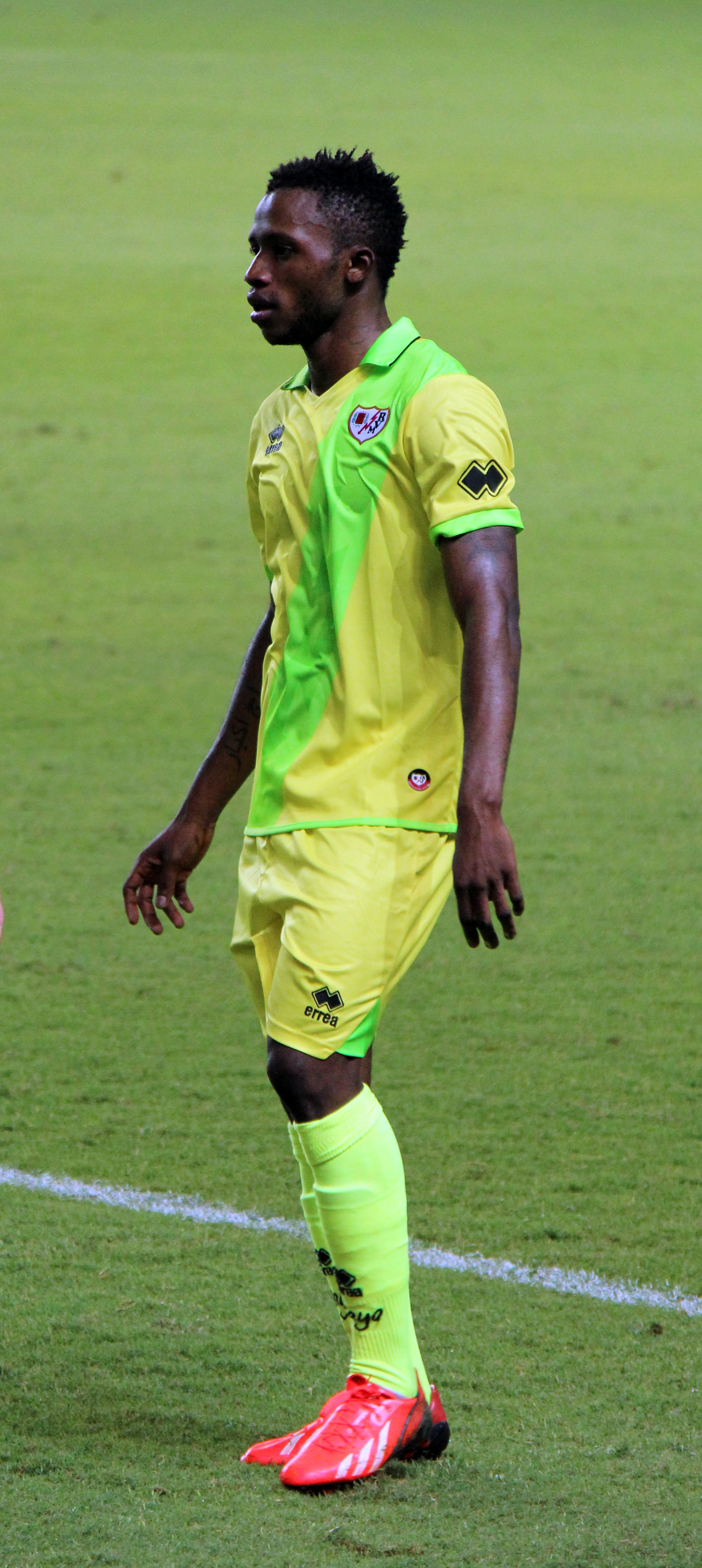
- Bangoura playing for Rayo Vallecano in 2013

Personal information
- Full name: Alhassane Bangoura
- Date of birth: 30 March 1992 (age 34)
- Place of birth: Conakry, Guinea
- Height: 1.74 m (5 ft 9 in)
- Position: Winger

Youth career
- Étoile de Guinée
- 2010–2011: Rayo Vallecano

Senior career*
Years	Team	Apps	(Gls)
2011–2022	Rayo Vallecano	140	(7)
2015	→ Granada (loan)	14	(0)
2016	→ Reims (loan)	10	(1)
2018	→ Almería (loan)	10	(0)
2019	→ Vancouver Whitecaps FC (loan)	17	(1)
2020	→ Lugo (loan)	3	(0)
2020–2021	→ Emelec (loan)	17	(0)
2022	→ Lamia (loan)	14	(1)
2022–2023	Chania	4	(1)

International career
2009	Guinea U17		
2011–2019	Guinea	37	(4)
- * Club domestic league appearances and goals as of 17:01, 26 January 2023 (UTC)

Alhassane "Lass" Bangoura (born 30 March 1992) is a Guinean professional footballer who plays as a right winger.

He spent the better part of his career with Rayo Vallecano, totalling 152 appearances. He also played in France, Canada, Ecuador and Greece.

Bangoura represented Guinea in two Africa Cup of Nations tournaments.

== Club career ==
=== Rayo Vallecano ===
Born in Conakry, Bangoura began his career with local Étoile de Guinée. In 2010, aged 18, he joined the youth ranks of Spanish club Rayo Vallecano, scoring 23 goals in 25 games in his last year as a junior.

Bangoura appeared in four Segunda División matches with the first team in the 2010–11 season, as the Madrid side returned to La Liga after an eight-year absence. In June 2011, he attracted the interest of neighbours Real Madrid, who made an offer to purchase him.

Bangoura made his debut in Spain's top division on 28 August 2011, playing 31 minutes in a 1–1 away draw against Athletic Bilbao. On 23 October he scored in the 2–0 win at Real Betis, who had also been promoted the previous campaign. On 19 February 2012, he netted twice in a 5–3 away victory over Levante UD.

In the early days of the 2015 January transfer window, Bangoura was loaned to Granada CF until June. He scored on his debut, a 1–2 home loss to Sevilla FC in the round of 16 of the Copa del Rey.

On 31 January 2016, Bangoura was loaned to Ligue 1 club Stade de Reims until the end of the season. He scored in his fifth appearance, a 4–1 defeat of FC Girondins de Bordeaux, in an eventual relegation.

On 1 February 2018, Bangoura was loaned to Spanish second division team UD Almería for six months. He made his debut two days later, coming on as a 46th-minute substitute for Mandi away against Lorca FC, in a 2–1 comeback win.

On 23 January 2019, Bangoura joined Major League Soccer side Vancouver Whitecaps FC on a one-year loan deal. He played 18 total matches, and scored in a 3–2 loss at the Houston Dynamo on 16 March.

Still owned by Rayo, on 1 February 2020 Bangoura was loaned to CD Lugo until 30 June. He continued to be loaned the following seasons, to C.S. Emelec (Ecuadorian Serie A) and PAS Lamia 1964 (Super League Greece).

=== Later career ===
Bangoura remained in Greece in September 2022, signing for Chania FC of the Super League 2.

== International career ==
Bangoura represented Guinea at the 2009 African U-17 Championship. He made his debut for the senior team in 2011 at the age of 19, and was selected for the 2012 and 2019 Africa Cup of Nations.

== Career statistics ==
=== Club ===
As of match played 1 July 2022

Appearances and goals by club, season and competition
Club	Season	League			National cup		Continental		Other		Total	
Club	Season	Division	Apps	Goals	Apps	Goals	Apps	Goals	Apps	Goals	Apps	Goals
Rayo Vallecano	2010–11	Segunda División	4	0	0	0	—		—		4	0
Rayo Vallecano	2011–12	La Liga	28	3	1	0	—		—		29	3
Rayo Vallecano	2012–13	La Liga	32	3	2	0	—		—		34	3
Rayo Vallecano	2013–14	La Liga	28	0	3	0	—		—		31	0
Rayo Vallecano	2014–15	La Liga	1	0	0	0	—		—		1	0
Rayo Vallecano	2015–16	La Liga	16	0	3	2	—		—		19	2
Rayo Vallecano	2016–17	Segunda División	22	1	1	0	—		—		23	1
Rayo Vallecano	2017–18	Segunda División	9	0	1	0	—		—		10	0
Rayo Vallecano	2018–19	La Liga	0	0	1	0	—		—		1	0
Rayo Vallecano	2020–21	Segunda División	0	0	0	0	—		—		0	0
Rayo Vallecano	Total		140	7	12	2	0	0	0	0	152	9
Granada (loan)	2014–15	La Liga	14	0	1	1	—		—		15	1
Reims (loan)	2015–16	Ligue 1	10	1	0	0	—		—		10	1
Almería (loan)	2017–18	Segunda División	10	0	0	0	—		—		10	0
Vancouver Whitecaps FC (loan)	2019	Major League Soccer	17	1	1	0	—		—		18	1
Lugo (loan)	2019–20	Segunda División	3	0	0	0	—		—		3	0
Emelec (loan)	2020	Ecuadorian Serie A	9	0	0	0	—		1 (Note: Appearance in Supercopa Ecuador)	0	10	0
Emelec (loan)	2021	Ecuadorian Serie A	8	0	0	0	3 (Note: Appearances in Copa Sudamericana)	0	—		11	0
Emelec (loan)	Total		17	0	0	0	3	0	1	0	21	0
Lamia (loan)	2021–22	Super League Greece	14	1	3	0	—		1 (Note: Appearance in Super League Greece play-out round)	0	3	0
Career total			225	10	17	3	3	0	2	0	247	13

=== International ===
Appearances and goals by national team and year
National team	Year	Apps	Goals
Guinea	2011	2	0
Guinea	2012	11	1
Guinea	2013	4	0
Guinea	2014	3	0
Guinea	2015	5	2
Guinea	2016	6	1
Guinea	2017	0	0
Guinea	2018	2	0
Guinea	2019	4	0
Total		37	4
