= Zé Castro =

Portuguese footballer

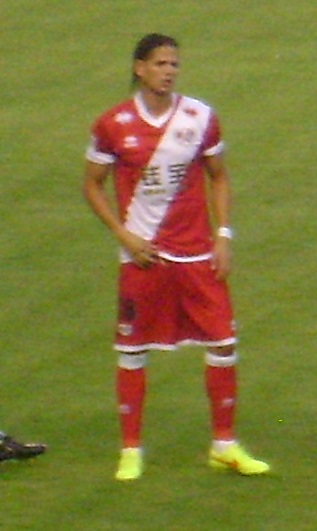
- Castro playing for Rayo Vallecano in 2014

Personal information
- Full name: José Eduardo Rosa Vale de Castro
- Date of birth: 13 January 1983 (age 43)
- Place of birth: Coimbra, Portugal
- Height: 1.83 m (6 ft 0 in)
- Position: Centre-back

Youth career
- 1990–2002: Académica

Senior career*
Years	Team	Apps	(Gls)
2002–2004	Académica B	53	(9)
2003–2006	Académica	55	(0)
2006–2009	Atlético Madrid	30	(2)
2008–2009	→ Deportivo La Coruña (loan)	29	(1)
2009–2013	Deportivo La Coruña	67	(0)
2013–2017	Rayo Vallecano	92	(2)
2017–2022	Académica	80	(6)
Total		406	(20)

International career
2003–2004	Portugal U20	11	(0)
2004–2006	Portugal U21	15	(1)
2005–2006	Portugal B	2	(0)
2009	Portugal	1	(0)
- * Club domestic league appearances and goals

José Eduardo Rosa Vale de Castro (born 13 January 1983), commonly known as Zé Castro, is a Portuguese former professional footballer who played as a central defender.

He started and finished his career with Académica, but spent 11 years in Spain representing Atlético Madrid, Deportivo and Rayo Vallecano. Appearing for all the clubs in La Liga, he amassed totals of 168 matches and five goals.

Castro earned 26 caps for Portugal at youth level, including 15 for the under-21 team. He made his full debut in 2009.

== Club career ==
=== Académica ===
Born in Coimbra, Castro entered hometown Académica de Coimbra's youth ranks as a child, and made his Primeira Liga debut on 5 October 2003, playing the full 90 minutes in a 4–1 away loss to Porto. Despite his young age, he eventually became an undisputed starter and team captain.

=== Atlético Madrid ===
In May 2006, after unfinished advances by Portugal's Big Three, Castro signed with Spanish club Atlético Madrid on a free transfer alongside compatriot Costinha. In his first year, he benefitted from injuries to teammates, appearing in 22 La Liga matches and scoring two goals (including an 83rd-minute strike against Osasuna for the game's only goal, at home, on 20 January 2007). He featured rarely in the following season.

=== Deportivo ===
In the summer of 2008, Castro joined fellow league side Deportivo de La Coruña on a season-long loan, with the Galicians having a buyout clause of €2 million for 50% of the player's rights; the remaining 50% were owned by a company. Again due to injury – habitual starter Pablo Amo was sidelined for months with an Achilles tendon problem – the Portuguese was able to start most of the campaign, and the option was activated for a permanent move.

Castro played only ten games in 2009–10, and featured even less the following season, prompting him to request a move in mid-November 2010. In March 2011, he was to be picked as a last-minute substitute for a league match against Real Sociedad after Aythami Artiles went down with a bout of gastroenteritis, but did not present himself at the Estadio Riazor and could not be traced through his mobile phone.

=== Later years ===
Following Depor's two relegations in the space of three seasons, and a promotion in between, Castro returned to both Madrid and the Spanish top flight on 29 August 2013, signing a one-year deal at Rayo Vallecano. In early July 2015, the 32-year-old extended that by a further three.

Castro returned to Académica on 25 September 2017, after an absence of 11 years. In April 2022, after the club confirmed its first-ever relegation to the third division, he announced his retirement, saying of Portuguese football "We are very ignorant, football-wise. We aren't illiterate, illiteracy is not being able to learn. If you can learn but don't want to, you're ignorant".

== International career ==
Shortly after his debut with Académica, Castro became a defensive stalwart for the Portugal under-21s, and appeared at the 2006 UEFA European Championship on home soil. There, he played three complete matches as the team exited in the group stage, and scored an own goal in the 2–0 defeat against Serbia.

On 10 June 2009, Castro finally made his full debut, in a 0–0 friendly draw in Estonia. On 10 May of the following year, in spite of a poor season at Deportivo, he was included in a provisional squad of 24 players announced by Carlos Queiroz in view of the 2010 FIFA World Cup; however, after Pepe recovered in time to participate in the competition, he was cut.

== Career statistics ==
=== Club ===
As of 16 April 2017

Appearances and goals by club, season and competition
Club	Season	League			Cup		Europe		Total	
Club	Season	Division	Apps	Goals	Apps	Goals	Apps	Goals	Apps	Goals
Académica B	2002–03	Segunda Divisão B	34	7	—		—		34	7
Académica B	2003–04	Segunda Divisão B	19	2	—		—		19	2
Académica B	Total		53	9	0	0	0	0	53	9
Académica	2003–04	Primeira Liga	1	0	0	0	—		1	0
Académica	2004–05	Primeira Liga	24	0	3	0	—		27	0
Académica	2005–06	Primeira Liga	30	0	3	0	—		33	0
Académica	Total		55	0	6	0	0	0	61	0
Atlético Madrid	2006–07	La Liga	22	2	1	0	—		23	2
Atlético Madrid	2007–08	La Liga	8	0	3	0	4	0	15	0
Atlético Madrid	Total		30	2	4	0	4	0	38	2
Deportivo (loan)	2008–09	La Liga	29	1	2	0	6	0	37	1
Deportivo	2009–10	La Liga	10	0	5	0	—		15	0
Deportivo	2010–11	La Liga	6	0	5	0	—		11	0
Deportivo	2011–12	Segunda División	27	0	1	0	—		28	0
Deportivo	2012–13	La Liga	24	0	0	0	—		24	0
Deportivo	Total		67	0	11	0	0	0	78	0
Rayo Vallecano	2013–14	La Liga	19	0	1	0	—		20	0
Rayo Vallecano	2014–15	La Liga	28	0	1	0	—		29	0
Rayo Vallecano	2015–16	La Liga	22	2	2	0	—		24	0
Rayo Vallecano	2016–17	Segunda División	23	0	1	0	—		24	0
Rayo Vallecano	Total		92	2	5	0	0	0	97	2
Career total			326	14	28	0	10	0	364	14

=== International ===
Appearances and goals by national team and year
National team	Year	Apps	Goals
Portugal	2009	1	0
Total		1	0

== Honours ==
Deportivo

- UEFA Intertoto Cup: 2008
- Segunda División: 2011–12
