= Ernesto Galán =

Spanish footballer (born 1986)

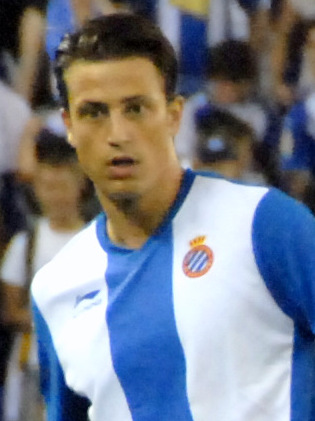

Personal information
- Full name: Ernesto Galán Íñigo
- Date of birth: 17 June 1986 (age 40)
- Place of birth: Madrid, Spain
- Height: 1.81 m (5 ft 11 in)
- Position: Defender

Youth career
- Villaviciosa Odón
- Getafe

Senior career*
Years	Team	Apps	(Gls)
2005–2006	Móstoles	32	(2)
2006–2009	Lleida	58	(4)
2007	→ Puertollano (loan)	14	(0)
2009–2013	Espanyol	33	(1)
2009–2010	→ Girona (loan)	37	(1)
2013	Xerez	13	(0)
2013–2014	Las Palmas	7	(0)
2014–2015	Alavés	14	(1)
2015–2016	Mirandés	33	(4)
2016–2018	Rayo Vallecano	29	(2)
2018–2019	Rayo Majadahonda	27	(0)
2021–2022	Villaviciosa Odón	9	(1)
Total		306	(16)
- * Club domestic league appearances and goals

Ernesto Galán Íñigo (born 17 June 1986) is a Spanish former professional footballer. Mainly a right-back, he also played as a central defender.

== Honours ==
Rayo Vallecano

- Segunda División: 2017–18
