= Nacho (footballer, born 1989) =

Spanish footballer

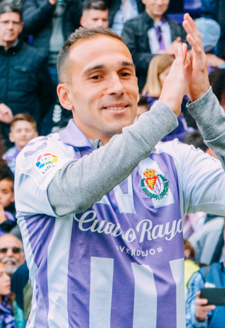
- Nacho with Valladolid in 2019

Personal information
- Full name: José Ignacio Martínez García
- Date of birth: 7 March 1989 (age 37)
- Place of birth: Madrid, Spain
- Height: 1.74 m (5 ft 8 1/2 in)
- Position: Left-back

Team information
- Current team: Cartagena
- Number: 22

Youth career
- Atlético Madrid

Senior career*
Years	Team	Apps	(Gls)
2008–2009	Alcobendas Sport	34	(4)
2009–2011	Osasuna B	60	(0)
2011–2012	Getafe B	32	(3)
2012–2013	Rayo Vallecano B	18	(2)
2012–2017	Rayo Vallecano	79	(1)
2017–2022	Valladolid	133	(3)
2022–2024	Tenerife	67	(3)
2025–	Cartagena	44	(2)
- * Club domestic league appearances and goals as of 10 June 2026

José Ignacio Martínez García (born 7 March 1989), known as Nacho, is a Spanish professional footballer who plays as a left-back for Primera Federación club Cartagena.

== Club career ==
=== Rayo Vallecano ===
Born in Madrid, Nacho played lower league and amateur football in his first three years as a senior, representing Fútbol Alcobendas Sport, CA Osasuna B and Getafe CF B. In summer 2012 he signed with another club from Segunda División B, Rayo Vallecano's reserves.

Nacho made his official debut with Rayo's first team on 31 October 2012, playing the full 90 minutes in a 1–0 away loss against UD Las Palmas in the round of 32 of the Copa del Rey. He first appeared in La Liga on 24 November (again as a starter), in the 2–0 home win over RCD Mallorca.

Nacho scored his first goal as a professional on 20 December 2012, netting from 30 metres for his team's second in a 3–0 league victory against Levante UD. On 31 May 2013, after contributing ten matches to his team's top-flight permanence, he was definitely promoted to the main squad with a contract running until June 2015.

=== Valladolid ===
On 6 July 2017, after five full seasons with Rayo, Nacho joined Real Valladolid of Segunda División on a two-year deal. He made 22 appearances in his debut campaign (21 starts, play-offs included), in a promotion after a fifth-place finish.

Nacho and his side again ascended to the top tier at the end of 2021–22, with 34 games and two goals from the player.

=== Later career ===
On 13 July 2022, the free agent Nacho agreed to a two-year contract with CD Tenerife. On 8 February 2025, the 35-year-old signed for FC Cartagena also in the second division.
