= Rayo Vallecano B =

Spanish Association football club

- Full name: Rayo Vallecano de Madrid B, S.A.D.
- Nickname: Rayo
- Founded: 1973
- Ground: Ciudad Deportiva, Madrid, Madrid, Spain
- Capacity: 2,500
- President: Raúl Martín Presa
- Head coach: Jorge Vallejo
- League: Tercera Federación – Group 7
- 2025–26: Segunda Federación – Group 5, 18th of 18 (relegated)
Home colours	Away colours	Third colours

Rayo Vallecano de Madrid B is the reserve team of Rayo Vallecano, a Spanish football club based in the Madrid neighbourhood of Vallecas. Founded in 1973 and plays in Tercera Federación – Group 7, holding home matches at Ciudad Deportiva Rayo Vallecano, with a 2,500-seat capacity.

== Season to season ==
- As a farm team

Season	Tier	Division	Place	Copa del Rey
1973–74	4	Reg. Pref.	12th	
1974–75	4	Reg. Pref.	15th	
1975–76	4	Reg. Pref.	14th	
1976–77	4	Reg. Pref.	15th	
1977–78	5	Reg. Pref.	10th	
1978–79	5	Reg. Pref.	18th	
1979–80	6	1ª Reg.	2nd	
1980–81	5	Reg. Pref.	5th	
1981–82	5	Reg. Pref.	8th	

Season	Tier	Division	Place	Copa del Rey
1982–83	5	Reg. Pref.	7th	
1983–84	5	Reg. Pref.	7th	
1984–85	5	Reg. Pref.	13th	
1985–86	5	Reg. Pref.	6th	
1986–87	5	Reg. Pref.	12th	
1987–88	5	Reg. Pref.	2nd	
1988–89	4	3ª	9th	
1989–90	4	3ª	11th	
1990–91	4	3ª	6th	

- As a reserve team

Season	Tier	Division	Place
1991–92	4	3ª	13th
1992–93	4	3ª	9th
1993–94	4	3ª	7th
1994–95	4	3ª	15th
1995–96	4	3ª	9th
1996–97	4	3ª	9th
1997–98	4	3ª	13th
1998–99	4	3ª	13th
1999–2000	4	3ª	8th
2000–01	4	3ª	9th
2001–02	4	3ª	7th
2002–03	4	3ª	5th
2003–04	4	3ª	9th
2004–05	4	3ª	7th
2005–06	4	3ª	8th
2006–07	4	3ª	13th
2007–08	4	3ª	13th
2008–09	4	3ª	5th
2009–10	4	3ª	1st
2010–11	3	2ª B	6th

Season	Tier	Division	Place
2011–12	3	2ª B	7th
2012–13	3	2ª B	19th
2013–14	4	3ª	2nd
2014–15	3	2ª B	17th
2015–16	4	3ª	15th
2016–17	4	3ª	15th
2017–18	4	3ª	3rd
2018–19	4	3ª	7th
2019–20	4	3ª	9th
2020–21	4	3ª	3rd / 6th
2021–22	5	3ª RFEF	9th
2022–23	5	3ª Fed.	14th
2023–24	5	3ª Fed.	15th
2024–25	5	3ª Fed.	2nd
2025–26	4	2ª Fed.	18th
2026–27	5	3ª Fed.	

- 4 seasons in Segunda División B
- 1 season in Segunda Federación
- 29 seasons in Tercera División
- 5 seasons in Tercera Federación/Tercera División RFEF

== Current squad ==
As of 14 October 2026.

Note: Flags indicate national team as defined under FIFA eligibility rules; some limited exceptions apply. Players may hold more than one non-FIFA nationality.

No.	Pos.	Nation	Player
1	GK	ESP	Adrián Molina
2	DF	ESP	Marco de las Sías
3	DF	ESP	Mani Ayyoub
4	DF	ESP	Sergio Lozano
5	DF	ESP	Víctor Revuelto
6	MF	ESP	Marco Román
7	MF	ESP	Iván Alonso
8	MF	MAR	Yahya Bourjila
9	FW	ESP	Javi Baldobar
10	MF	ESP	Samu Becerra
11	MF	ESP	Iván Iñigo
13	GK	ESP	Dani Vadillo
14	FW	ESP	Rami

No.	Pos.	Nation	Player
16	MF	ESP	Jorge Escobar
17	FW	ESP	Hugo Castaño
18	FW	MAR	Hamza Daoud
19	FW	MAR	Ayman El Hahaoui
20	MF	ESP	Samuel Rosario
21	MF	ESP	Mauro Ballesteros
22	DF	ESP	Beto Plaza
23	DF	ESP	Álex Sibacha
24	DF	CMR	Gerber Tanko
25	GK	SEN	Babacar Mendy
27	DF	LBN	Mansour Elmasri
30	MF	ESP	Nacho Carrasco

=== Youth team ===
Note: Flags indicate national team as defined under FIFA eligibility rules; some limited exceptions apply. Players may hold more than one non-FIFA nationality.

No.	Pos.	Nation	Player

=== Current technical staff ===
Position	Staff
Manager	(Spain) Jorge Vallejo
Assistant manager	(Spain) Marcos Pastor (Spain) Jona
Fitness coach	(Japan) Shori Sasaki (Spain) Paco García
Goalkeeping coach	(Spain) Miguel Ángel Triguero
Analyst	(Spain) Sebas

Last updated: September 2025
Source: Rayo Vallecano

=== Notable players ===
Note: This list includes players that have appeared in at least 100 top league games and/or have reached international status.

- (Brazil) Léo Baptistão
- (Burkina Faso) Blati Touré
- (Equatorial Guinea) Evuy
- (Equatorial Guinea) Luis Meseguer
- (Guinea) Lass Bangoura
- (Ivory Coast) Mohamed Tijani
- (Martinique) Samuel Camille
- (Peru) Christian Cueva
- (Spain) Antonio Amaya
- (Spain) Alejandro Arribas
- (Spain) Fran Beltrán
- (Spain) Coke
- (Spain) Cota
- (Spain) Adri Embarba
- (Spain) Borja García
- (Spain) Diego Mainz
- (Spain) Jaime Mata
- (Spain) Míchel
- (Spain) Luis Milla
- (Spain) Nacho
- (Spain) Álvaro Negredo
- (Spain) Lucas Pérez
- (Venezuela) Dani Hernández
