= Antonio Amaya =

Spanish footballer (born 1983)

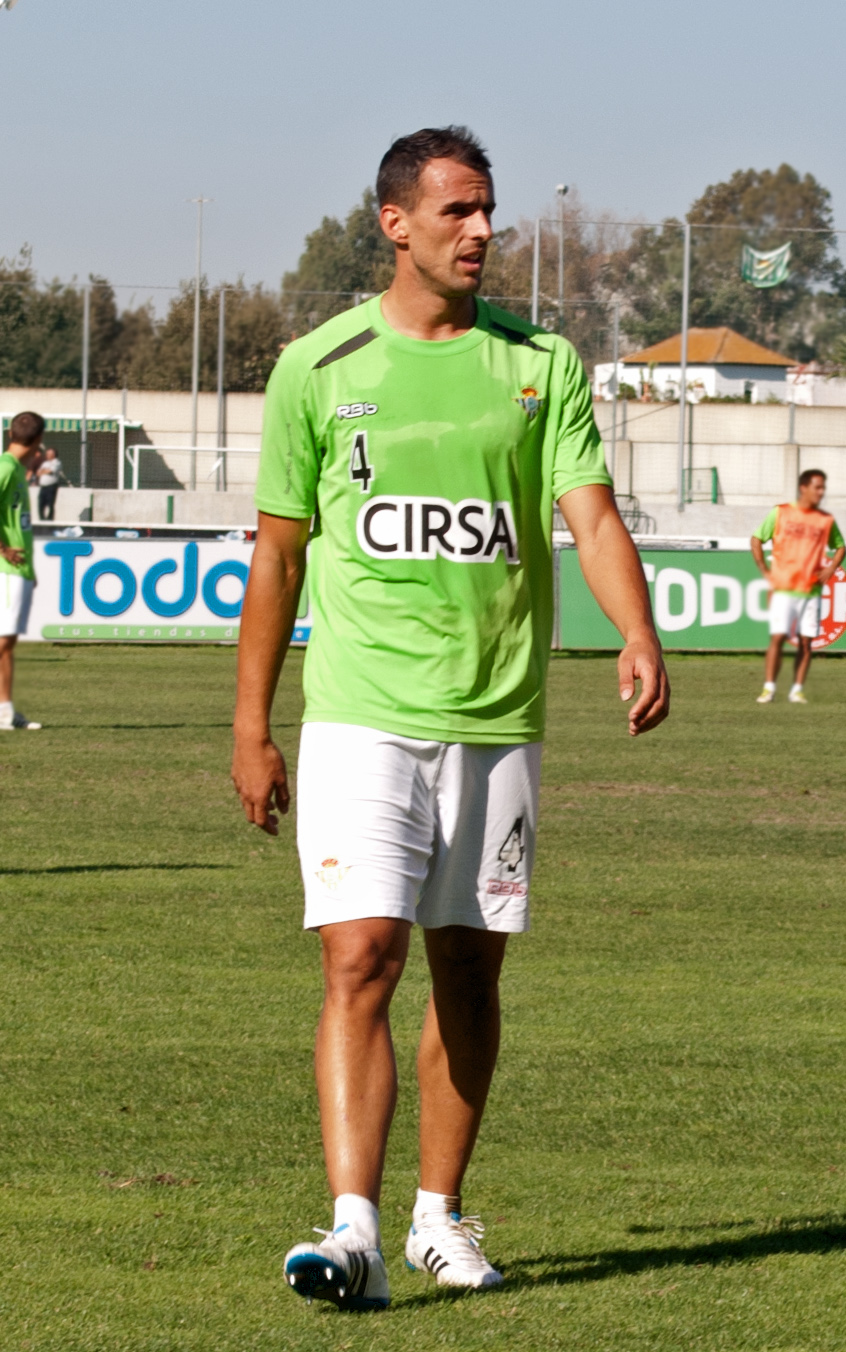
- Amaya training with Betis in 2011

Personal information
- Full name: Antonio Amaya Carazo
- Date of birth: 31 May 1983 (age 43)
- Place of birth: Madrid, Spain
- Height: 1.92 m (6 ft 4 in)
- Position: Centre-back

Youth career
- San Cristóbal

Senior career*
Years	Team	Apps	(Gls)
2002–2003	Rayo Vallecano B	23	(2)
2003–2009	Rayo Vallecano	124	(5)
2004	→ S.S. Reyes (loan)	15	(0)
2009–2011	Wigan Athletic	0	(0)
2010–2011	→ Rayo Vallecano (loan)	28	(0)
2011–2014	Betis	64	(1)
2014–2018	Rayo Vallecano	85	(5)
2018–2019	UCAM Murcia	7	(1)
Total		346	(14)
- * Club domestic league appearances and goals

Antonio Amaya Carazo (Spanish pronunciation: [anˈtonjo aˈmaʝa kaˈɾaθo]; born 31 May 1983) is a Spanish former professional footballer who played as a central defender.

He spent most of his 17-year career with Rayo Vallecano, making 254 appearances across three spells in all of the top three divisions.

== Club career ==
=== Early years and Rayo ===
Born in the capital of Madrid, Amaya began his career at local San Cristóbal de los Ángeles. He joined another team in the community, Rayo Vallecano, in 2002, also serving a six-month loan spell at lowly UD San Sebastián de los Reyes in the Segunda División B.

Eventually, Amaya returned to Rayo, becoming an important defensive unit for a side that returned to Segunda División at the end of the 2007–08 season and comfortably retained their league status the following campaign, with the player appearing in less than half of the games (18 out of 42).

=== Wigan Athletic ===
Amaya signed for Premier League club Wigan Athletic on a three-year contract on 14 August 2009, being joined by Rayo teammate Mohamed Diamé a week later. He made his debut in a 4–1 defeat at Blackpool in the second round of the Football League Cup on the 26th, scoring his team's goal with a header in stoppage time.

After failing to make a single league appearance in 2009–10, Amaya returned to his former employers Rayo in a season-long loan. He was regularly used as they returned to La Liga after an eight-year absence.

=== Betis ===
On 18 July 2011, Wigan announced the departure of Amaya, who signed a three-year contract with Real Betis. He scored his first goal on 1 December 2013, in a 2–2 home draw against Rayo.

=== Return to Rayo ===
In early June 2014, following Betis' top-flight relegation, Amaya once again returned to Rayo Vallecano. He finished the first season in his second spell with 19 games and one goal, helping them to easily avoid relegation.

On 20 December 2015, Amaya was on target at the Santiago Bernabéu Stadium, but his team had to play with nine players for more than 60 minutes and were eventually crushed 10–2 by hosts Real Madrid. The veteran contributed 17 matches and one goal in the 2017–18 campaign, helping to promotion to the top tier as champions.

=== UCAM Murcia ===
On 31 July 2018, Amaya signed with third division club UCAM Murcia CF.

== Personal life ==
Amaya's older brother, Iván, was also a footballer and a central defender. Both represented local Rayo.

Their family were Romani people.

== Honours ==
Rayo Vallecano

- Segunda División: 2017–18
- Segunda División B: 2007–08
