= Adri Embarba =

Spanish footballer

Personal information
- Full name: Adrián Embarba Blázquez
- Date of birth: 7 May 1992 (age 34)
- Place of birth: Madrid, Spain
- Height: 1.73 m (5 ft 8 in)
- Position: Winger

Team information
- Current team: Almería
- Number: 23

Youth career
- 2004–2006: Real Madrid
- 2006–2009: Alcalá
- 2009–2010: Leganés
- 2010–2011: Getafe

Senior career*
Years	Team	Apps	(Gls)
2011–2012	Marchamalo	37	(6)
2012–2013	Carabanchel	37	(9)
2013–2014	Rayo Vallecano B	7	(4)
2013–2020	Rayo Vallecano	186	(32)
2020–2022	Espanyol	89	(11)
2022–	Almería	114	(22)
2024–2025	→ Rayo Vallecano (loan)	35	(1)
- * Club domestic league appearances and goals as of 21:55, 15 November 2026 (UTC)

Adrián "Adri" Embarba Blázquez (Spanish pronunciation: [aˈðɾjan ˈaðɾjemˈbaɾβa ˈβlaθkeθ]; (Note: In isolation, Blázquez is pronounced [ˈblaθkeθ].) born 7 May 1992) is a Spanish professional footballer who plays as a right winger for Segunda División club Almería.

== Career ==
=== Early career ===
Born in Madrid, Embarba finished his development with local Getafe CF after youth spells with neighbouring Real Madrid, RSD Alcalá and CD Leganés. He made his senior debut in the 2011–12 season with CD Marchamalo in Castilla–La Mancha, scoring six goals in the Tercera División.

Embarba signed with RCD Carabanchel in June 2012.

=== Rayo Vallecano ===
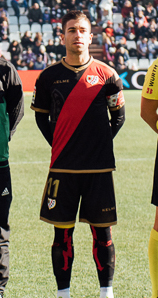
Embarba with Rayo Vallecano in 2019

In July 2013, Embarba joined Rayo Vallecano, being assigned to the reserves also in the fourth tier. He made his first-team – and La Liga – debut on 30 August, coming off the bench for the injured Iago Falque and playing 65 minutes in a 2–1 home defeat against Levante UD.

On 12 June 2014, Embarba signed a new three-year deal with Rayo, being definitely promoted to the main squad. He scored his first professional goal on 14 March of the following year, the last in the 3–1 win over Granada CF also at the Campo de Fútbol de Vallecas.

Embarba contributed two goals in 28 appearances during the 2015–16 campaign, as the club suffered relegation. On 8 October 2017, he scored a brace in a 4–1 Segunda División home rout of Real Valladolid.

On 19 December 2017, after establishing himself as a regular starter, Embarba renewed his contract until 2021. He achieved promotion to the top flight in 2017–18, scoring eight times and adding 14 assists in the process.

=== Espanyol ===
Embarba transferred to RCD Espanyol on 23 January 2020, after his €10 million release clause was paid. After being relegated in his first season, he helped his side to return to the main division in the second by scoring a career-best nine goals.

Embarba featured much less in 2021–22 (also failing to find the net), mainly due to a run-in with manager Vicente Moreno early into the campaign.

=== Almería ===
On 24 August 2022, Embarba moved to UD Almería, newly promoted to the top tier. He scored four goals and provided three assists in his debut campaign, with his team managing to stay afloat.

On 26 July 2024, after suffering relegation, Embarba returned to Rayo after 11 years, agreeing to a one-year loan deal. Back at Almería for 2025–26, he scored a career-best 15 goals for the third-placed side in the second division.

== Personal life ==
Embarba's second cousin, Isaac, is also a footballer. A midfielder, he also played for Rayo.

== Honours ==
Rayo Vallecano

- Segunda División: 2017–18

Espanyol

- Segunda División: 2020–21

Individual

- Segunda División Player of the Month: March 2021
