= 2014–15 Rayo Vallecano season =

Rayo Vallecano
2014–15 season
- President: Raúl Martín Presa
- Head coach: Paco Jémez
- Stadium: Campo de Vallecas
- La Liga: 11th
- Copa del Rey: Round of 32
- Top goalscorer: League: Alberto Bueno (17); All: Alberto Bueno (17)
Home colours	Away colours	Third colours

The 2014–15 Rayo Vallecano season is the club's 90th season in its history and its 16th in La Liga.

== Squad statistics ==
=== Appearances and goals ===
Updated as of 30 May 2015.

No.	Pos	Nat	Player	Total		La Liga		Copa del Rey	
No.	Pos	Nat	Player	Apps	Goals	Apps	Goals	Apps	Goals
1	GK	(Spain) ESP	David Cobeño	4	0	2+1	0	1	0
2	DF	(Spain) ESP	Tito	35	0	31+2	0	1+1	0
3	DF	(Spain) ESP	Nacho	15	0	11+2	0	2	0
4	DF	(Spain) ESP	Antonio Amaya	21	1	19	1	0+2	0
6	MF	(Ghana) GHA	Mohammed Fatau	10	0	9+1	0	0	0
7	FW	(Venezuela) VEN	Miku	7	2	2+5	2	0	0
8	MF	(Spain) ESP	Raúl Baena	30	2	28	2	2	0
9	FW	(Angola) ANG	Manucho	38	5	12+25	5	1	0
10	MF	(Spain) ESP	Roberto Trashorras	33	1	33	1	0	0
12	MF	(France) FRA	Gaël Kakuta	35	5	35	5	0	0
13	GK	(Argentina) ARG	Cristian Álvarez	18	0	16+1	0	1	0
14	DF	(Argentina) ARG	Emiliano Insúa	24	1	21+3	1	0	0
15	DF	(Senegal) SEN	Abdoulaye Ba	20	0	20	0	0	0
16	MF	(Mexico) MEX	Javier Aquino	24	0	13+11	0	0	0
17	DF	(Spain) ESP	Quini	18	0	10+7	0	1	0
18	DF	(Portugal) POR	Zé Castro	29	0	28	0	1	0
19	FW	(Brazil) BRA	Léo Baptistão	26	7	22+3	7	0+1	0
20	DF	(Spain) ESP	Jorge Morcillo	15	1	7+6	1	2	0
21	MF	(Spain) ESP	Jozabed	25	2	10+13	1	2	1
22	MF	(Portugal) POR	Licá	23	0	17+4	0	2	0
23	FW	(Spain) ESP	Alberto Bueno	36	17	35+1	17	0	0
24	MF	(Spain) ESP	Alejandro Pozuelo	13	1	3+8	0	2	1
25	GK	(Spain) ESP	Toño	21	0	20+1	0	0	0
27	DF	(Spain) ESP	Álex Moreno	13	1	4+7	0	2	1
29	MF	(Spain) ESP	Adrian Embarba	16	4	9+5	3	1+1	1
34	MF	(Spain) ESP	Pablo Clavería	1	0	0+1	0	0	0
Players who have made an appearance or had a squad number this season but have been loaned out or transferred
7	MF	(Guinea) GUI	Lass Bangoura	1	0	0+1	0	0	0
11	FW	(Spain) ESP	Jonathan Pereira	5	1	1+2	0	1+1	1

=== Transfers ===
In:

No.	Pos.	Nation	Player
—	DF	ESP	Antonio Amaya (from Betis)
—	DF	ESP	Diego Aguirre (from Toledo)
—	MF	GHA	Derek Boateng (from Fulham)
—	MF	ESP	Jozabed (from Jaén)
—	FW	ANG	Manucho (from Valladolid)
—	DF	ESP	Jorge Morcillo (from Recreativo Huelva)
—	FW	ESP	Álex Moreno (from Mallorca)
—	DF	ESP	Quini (from Real Madrid Castilla)

Out:

No.	Pos.	Nation	Player
—	DF	ESP	Anaitz Arbilla (to Espanyol)
—	DF	ESP	Álex Gálvez (to Werder Bremen)
—	MF	ESP	Adrián (to Elche)
—	MF	ESP	José Carlos (to Córdoba)
—	FW	ARG	Joaquín Larrivey (to Celta Vigo)
—	FW	ITA	Samuele Longo (loan return to Inter Milan, later loaned to Cagliari)
—	GK	ESP	Rubén (to Almería)
—	MF	ESP	Saúl (loan return to Atlético Madrid)

== Competitions ==
=== Overall ===
Competition	Started round	Final position / round	First match	Last match
La Liga	—		August 2014	May 2015
Copa del Rey	Round of 32		December 2014	

Updated to match played June 2014
Source: Competitions

=== Primera División ===
==== League table ====
Pos	Team	Pld	W	D	L	GF	GA	GD	Pts	Qualification or relegation
9	Málaga	38	14	8	16	42	48	−6	50	
10	Espanyol	38	13	10	15	47	51	−4	49 (Note: Espanyol ahead on head-to-head record; Rayo Vallecano–Espanyol 1–3, Espanyol–Rayo Vallecano 1–1.)	
11	Rayo Vallecano	38	15	4	19	46	68	−22	49	
12	Real Sociedad	38	11	13	14	44	51	−7	46	
13	Elche (Note: Elche administratively relegated by the LFP.) (R)	38	11	8	19	35	62	−27	41	Relegation to Segunda División

Source: La Liga
Rules for classification: 1) points; 2) head-to-head points; 3) head-to-head goal difference; 4) goal difference; 5) number of goals scored; 6) fair-play points; 7) playoff match
(R) Relegated

==== Matches ====
Kickoff times are in CET and CEST

Win Draw Lose Postponed

25 August 2014 1	Rayo Vallecano	0–0	Atlético Madrid	Madrid
22:00	Baena (yellow card) 33'; Ba (yellow card) 63'	Summary	Suárez (yellow card) 83'; Juanfran (yellow card) 90+2'	Stadium: Campo de Vallecas; Attendance: 11,070; Referee: Carlos Clos Gómez

31 August 2014 2	Deportivo La Coruña	2–2	Rayo Vallecano	A Coruña
21:00	Rodríguez 7', (yellow card) 37'; Lopo (yellow card) 27'; Insua (yellow card) 45+1'; Laure (yellow card) 83'; Cuenca 90+5' (pen.)	Summary	Bueno 40', 73'; Quini (yellow card) 43'; Tito (yellow card) 52'; Baena (yellow card) 84'; Castro (yellow card) 89'; Trashorras (yellow card) 90'; Ba (yellow card) 90+4'	Stadium: Riazor; Attendance: 18,054

14 September 2014 3	Rayo Vallecano	2–3	Elche	Madrid
12:00	Ba (yellow card) 7'; Kakuta 45'; Castro (yellow card) 53'; Bueno 90+1' (pen.)	Summary	Albácar 37'; Lombán (yellow card) 50'; Jonathas 55'; Mosquera 69'; Giménez (yellow card) 71'	Stadium: Campo de Vallecas; Attendance: 9,521; Referee: Iñaki Vicandi Garrido

21 September 2014 4	Villarreal	4–2	Rayo Vallecano	Villarreal
17:00	Espinosa (yellow card) 31', (goal) 33'; Musacchio 62'; Rukavina (yellow card) 73'; Vietto 74', 87'	Summary	Kakuta 22'; Bueno 29', (yellow card) 69'; Insúa (yellow card) 77'	Stadium: El Madrigal; Attendance: 15,050; Referee: Eduardo Prieto Iglesias

24 September 2014 5	Rayo Vallecano	2–1	Athletic Bilbao	Madrid
20:00	Quini (yellow card) 18'; Baptistão 39', 89'; Trashorras (yellow card) 82'	Summary	Aduriz 20'; Gurpegui (yellow card) 79'; De Marcos (yellow card) 84'	Stadium: Campo de Vallecas; Attendance: 11,040; Referee: Mario Melero López

27 September 2014 6	Levante	0–2	Rayo Vallecano	Valencia
22:00 CET	Navarro (yellow card) 10'; Rodas (yellow card) 28'; Simão Mate (yellow card) 37'; Diop (yellow card) 87'	Summary	Baptistão 12', 33'; Baena (yellow card) 48'; Kakuta (yellow card) 57'; Castro (yellow card) 87'	Stadium: Ciutat de València; Attendance: 18,000; Referee: Xavier Estrada Fernández

4 October 2014 7	Rayo Vallecano	0–2	Barcelona	Madrid
18:00 CET	Ba (yellow card) 18'; Trashorras (yellow card) 33'; Morcillo (yellow card) 37' (yellow-red card) 60'; Aquino (yellow card) 63' (yellow-red card) 90+1'	Summary	Xavi (yellow card) 10'; Messi 35'; Neymar 36'; Piqué (yellow card) 72'	Stadium: Campo de Vallecas; Attendance: 14,070; Referee: Antonio Mateu Lahoz

17 October 2014 8	Granada	0–1	Rayo Vallecano	Granada
	Marreh (yellow card) 45+1'; Nyom (yellow card) 69'; Piti (yellow card) 72'; Rico (yellow card) 80'	Report	Amaya (yellow card) 38'; Pereira (yellow card) 38'; Ba (yellow card) 53'; Insúa (yellow card) 86'; Baena (yellow card) 89'; Manucho 90+3'	Stadium: Los Cármenes; Attendance: 19,000; Referee: Santiago Jaime Latre

26 October 2014 9	Málaga	4–0	Rayo Vallecano	Málaga
	Samu 6'; Rosales (yellow card) 13'; Darder 21'; Juanmi 45'; Amrabat 49' (pen.)		Baptistão (yellow card) 28'; Baena (yellow card) 37'; Tito (yellow card) 41'; Amaya (yellow card) 48'	Stadium: La Rosaleda; Attendance: 21,800; Referee: Alfonso Álvarez Izquierdo

3 November 2014 10	Rayo Vallecano	2–3	Eibar	Madrid
	Nacho (yellow card) 36'; Baptistão 67', 68'	Report	Arruabarrena 37' (pen.), 86'; Piovaccari 49'; Lillo (yellow card) 54'; García (yellow card) 61'	Stadium: Campo de Vallecas; Attendance: 10,625; Referee: Ignacio Iglesias Villanueva

8 November 2014 11	Real Madrid	5–1	Rayo Vallecano	Madrid
	Bale 9'; Ramos 40'; Kroos 55'; Benzema 59'; Ronaldo 83'	Report	Bueno 44'; Fatau (yellow card) 45'; Tito (yellow card) 56'; Licá (yellow card) 79'; Quini (yellow card) 90+2'	Stadium: Santiago Bernabéu; Attendance: 76,842; Referee: Pedro Pérez Montero

23 November 2014 12	Rayo Vallecano	1–0	Celta Vigo	Madrid
	Bueno 20'; Nacho (yellow card) 27'; Trashorras (yellow card) 42'; Licá (yellow card) 44'; Tito (yellow card) 51'; Baena (yellow card) 76'; Álvarez (yellow card) 90+2'	Report	Orellana (yellow card) 24'; Cabral (yellow card) 27'; Nolito (yellow card) 45+2'; Charles (yellow card) 88'; Fernández (yellow card) 90+3'	Stadium: Campo de Vallecas; Attendance: 7,100; Referee: José González González

1 December 2014 13	Almería	0–1	Rayo Vallecano	Almería
	Verza (yellow card) 28'; Trujillo (yellow card) 41'; Dubarbier (yellow card) 83'; Michel (yellow card) 90+1'	Report	Ba (yellow card) 11'; Tito (yellow card) 19'; Jozabed (yellow card) 67'; Baptistão (yellow card) 77'; Kakuta 86'	Stadium: Mediterráneo; Attendance: 8,500; Referee: Antonio Mateu Lahoz

7 December 2014 14	Rayo Vallecano	0–1	Sevilla	Madrid
	Trashorras (yellow card) 15'; Baena (yellow card) 33'; Ba (yellow card) 36'; Manucho (yellow card) 73'	Report	Bacca 8', (yellow card) 82'; Krychowiak (yellow card) 30'; Vitolo (yellow card) 36'; Pareja (yellow card) 40'; Banega (yellow card) 65'; Carriço (yellow card) 75' (yellow-red card) 87'; Beto (yellow card) 90+3'	Stadium: Campo de Vallecas; Attendance: 11,604; Referee: Alfonso Álvarez Izquierdo

13 December 2014 15	Valencia	3–0	Rayo Vallecano	Valencia
	Gomes (yellow card) 9' (yellow-red card) 71'; Feghouli 13', 34'; Piatti 36'; Fuego (yellow card) 54'; Negredo (yellow card) 74'; Filipe Augusto (yellow card) 76'	Report	Morcillo (yellow card) 32'; Bueno (yellow card) 44'; Insúa (yellow card) 65'	Stadium: Mestalla; Attendance: 41,000; Referee: José Teixeira Vitienes

20 December 2014 16	Rayo Vallecano	1–3	Espanyol	Madrid
	Baena (yellow card) 34'; Insúa (yellow card) 40'; Baptistão 45'; Quini (yellow card) 90'	Report	García 9', 90+5'; Sevilla (yellow card) 17'; Bailly (yellow card) 29'; Álvaro (yellow card) 67'; Stuani (yellow card) 72' (yellow-red card) 81'; Vázquez 76', (yellow card) 79'	Stadium: Campo de Vallecas; Attendance: 7,776; Referee: Juan Martínez Munuera

4 January 2015 17	Getafe	1–2	Rayo Vallecano	Getafe
	Vázquez 3'; Valera (yellow card) 27'; Sarabia (yellow card) 35'; Lacen (yellow card) 66'	Report	Jozabed 39'; Baena 64'; Insúa (yellow card) 84'; Trashorras (yellow card) 87'	Stadium: Coliseum Alfonso Pérez; Attendance: 6,500; Referee: Alejandro Hernández Hernández

12 January 2015 18	Rayo Vallecano	0–1	Córdoba	Madrid
	Ba (yellow card) 27'; Tito (yellow card) 53'; Trashorras (yellow card) 70'	Report	Bebé (yellow card) 7'; Ba 39' (o.g.); Campabadal (yellow card) 58'	Stadium: Campo de Vallecas; Attendance: 10,620; Referee: Xavier Estrada Fernández

17 January 2015 19	Real Sociedad	0–1	Rayo Vallecano	San Sebastián
		Report	Manucho (yellow card) 65', (goal) 81'; Trashorras (yellow card) 74'; Quini (yellow card) 77'; Ba (yellow card) 87'	Stadium: Anoeta; Attendance: 21,542; Referee: Mario Melero López

24 January 2015 20	Atlético Madrid	3–1	Rayo Vallecano	Madrid
	Griezmann 12', 22'; Manucho 56' (o.g.); Gabi (yellow card) 81'	Report	Trashorras 35'; Baena (yellow card) 59'	Stadium: Vicente Calderón; Attendance: 37,202; Referee: Iñaki Vicandi Garrido

30 January 2015 21	Rayo Vallecano	1–2	Deportivo La Coruña	Madrid
	Bueno 22'; Castro (yellow card) 30'; Ba (yellow card) 71'; Baena (yellow card) 90+4'; Toño (yellow card) 90+5'	Report	Borges 10', 72' (pen.); Rodríguez (yellow card) 39'; Laure (yellow card) 51'; Sidnei (yellow card) 51'; Lucas (yellow card) 59'; Insua (yellow card) 90+1'	Stadium: Campo de Vallecas; Attendance: 10,724; Referee: Eduardo Prieto Iglesias

9 February 2015 22	Elche	2–0	Rayo Vallecano	Elche
	Suárez 21'; Albácar (yellow card) 48'; Rodrigues 82'; Fajr (yellow card) 88'	Report	Bueno (yellow card) 26'; Baptistão (yellow card) 36'; Baena (yellow card) 72' (yellow-red card) 76'; Jozabed (yellow card) 89'	Stadium: Manuel Martínez Valero; Attendance: 14,000; Referee: Fernando Teixeira Vitienes

15 February 2015 23	Rayo Vallecano	2–0	Villarreal	Madrid
	Fatau (yellow card) 44'; Bueno 51'; Kakuta 69'; Amaya (yellow card) 72'	Report	Pina (yellow card) 36'; Campbell (yellow card) 82'	Stadium: Campo de Vallecas; Attendance: 10,914; Referee: Pedro Pérez Montero

22 February 2015 24	Athletic Bilbao	1–0	Rayo Vallecano	Bilbao
	San José (yellow card) 20'; Aduriz (yellow card) 78', (goal) 86'; Rico (yellow card) 83'	Report	Nacho (yellow card) 23'; Fatau (yellow card) 59'	Stadium: San Mamés; Attendance: 32,600; Referee: David Fernández Borbalán

28 February 2015 25	Rayo Vallecano	4–2	Levante	Madrid
	Bueno 23', 32', 33', 38'; Castro (yellow card) 43'; Baena (yellow card) 76'	Report	Víctor 13'; Diop (yellow card) 16'; Uche 85'	Stadium: Campo de Vallecas; Attendance: 10,512; Referee: Iñaki Vicandi Garrido

8 March 2015 26	Barcelona	6–1	Rayo Vallecano	Barcelona
	Suárez 5', 90+1'; Mascherano (yellow card) 29'; Piqué 49'; Messi 56' (pen.), 63', 68'; Alba (yellow card) 57'; Alves (red card) 80'; Adriano (yellow card) 90'	Report	Tito (yellow card) 27' (yellow-red card) 54'; Trashorras (yellow card) 56'; Bueno 81' (pen.); Aquino (yellow card) 84'	Stadium: Camp Nou; Attendance: 87,151; Referee: Jesús Gil Manzano

14 March 2015 27	Rayo Vallecano	3–1	Granada	Madrid
	Baena (yellow card) 51'; Amaya (yellow card) 61'; Bueno 65', 76', (yellow card) 66'; Embarba 90+4'	Report	Córdoba 8'; Pérez (yellow card) 13'; Insúa (yellow card) 27'	Stadium: Campo de Vallecas; Attendance: 10,952; Referee: Alejandro Hernández Hernández

21 March 2015 28	Rayo Vallecano	1–0	Málaga	Madrid
	Nacho (yellow card) 7'; Kakuta 22'; Amaya (yellow card) 32'; Baena (yellow card) 57'; Embarba (yellow card) 59'; Manucho (yellow card) 69'; Castro (yellow card) 83'; Trashorras (yellow card) 90+1'; Tito (yellow card) 90+4'	Report	Angeleri (yellow card) 26' (yellow-red card) 74'	Stadium: Campo de Vallecas; Attendance: 9,110; Referee: Santiago Jaime Latre

3 April 2015 29	Eibar	1–2	Rayo Vallecano	Eibar
	Arruabarrena 35' (pen.); Piovaccari (yellow card) 58'; Añibarro (yellow card) 60'; Vilà (yellow card) 90+4'; Navas (yellow card) 90+3' (yellow-red card) 90+5'	Report	Álvarez (yellow card) 34'; Bueno 40'; Manucho 42', (yellow card) 54'; Tito (yellow card) 74'	Stadium: Ipurua; Attendance: 5,000; Referee: Ignacio Iglesias Villanueva

8 April 2015 30	Rayo Vallecano	0–2	Real Madrid	Madrid
	Tito (yellow card) 40'; Nacho (yellow card) 44'; Cobeño (yellow card) 61'; Amaya (yellow card) 63'	Report	Rodríguez (yellow card) 20', (goal) 73'; Kroos (yellow card) 51'; Ronaldo (yellow card) 51', (goal) 68'; Bale (yellow card) 52'; Carvajal (yellow card) 54'	Stadium: Campo de Vallecas; Attendance: 13,009; Referee: Mario Melero López

11 April 2015 31	Celta de Vigo	6–1	Rayo Vallecano	Vigo
	Larrivey 6', 37'; Mina 21', 40', 51', 56'; Fernández (yellow card) 23'	Report	Manucho 1'; Trashorras (yellow card) 38'	Stadium: Balaídos; Attendance: 21,000; Referee: Carlos Clos Gómez

19 April 2015 32	Rayo Vallecano	2–0	Almería	Madrid
	Amaya 23'; Tito (yellow card) 76'; Miku 90'	Report	Dubarbier (yellow card) 52'; Espinosa (yellow card) 79'	Stadium: Campo de Vallecas; Attendance: 10,165; Referee: Jesús Gil Manzano

26 April 2015 33	Sevilla	2–0	Rayo Vallecano	Seville
	Iborra 16'; Carriço 43'	Report	Morcillo (yellow card) 31'; Insúa (yellow card) 76'	Stadium: Ramón Sánchez Pizjuán; Attendance: 28,532; Referee: Santiago Jaime Latre

30 April 2015 34	Rayo Vallecano	1–1	Valencia	Madrid
	Embarba 19'; Morcillo (red card) 62'; Toño (yellow card) 63'; Fatau (yellow card) 80'	Report	Parejo 66'; Feghouli (yellow card) 74'; Rodrigo (red card) 77'	Stadium: Campo de Vallecas; Attendance: 10,055; Referee: Iñaki Vicandi Garrido

3 May 2015 35	Espanyol	1–1	Rayo Vallecano	Barcelona
	Arbilla (yellow card) 57'; Sánchez (yellow card) 64'; Moreno 80'; Duarte (yellow card) 87'; Cañas (yellow card) 90+4' (yellow-red card) 90+4'	Report	Insúa 29'; Toño (yellow card) 64'	Stadium: Cornellà-El Prat; Attendance: 15,435; Referee: Fernando Teixeira Vitienes

11 May 2015 36	Rayo Vallecano	2–0	Getafe	Madrid
	Manucho 28', (yellow card) 48'; Insúa (yellow card) 62'; Miku 73'; Aquino (red card) 87'	Report	Sarabia (yellow card) 75'; Alexis (yellow card) 82'; Lago (red card) 87'	Stadium: Campo de Vallecas; Attendance: 9,475; Referee: Pedro Pérez Montero

17 May 2015 37	Córdoba	1–2	Rayo Vallecano	Córdoba
	Luso 56'	Report	Baena 21'; Embarba 78'	Stadium: Nuevo Arcángel; Attendance: 7,619; Referee: Antonio Mateu Lahoz

23 May 2015 38	Rayo Vallecano	2–4	Real Sociedad	Madrid
	Morcillo (yellow card) 17', (goal) 64'; Bueno 42'	Report	Vela 19'; Castro 21'; Agirretxe 73'; Elustondo 75'	Stadium: Campo de Vallecas; Attendance: 9,593; Referee: Fernando Teixeira Vitienes

=== Copa del Rey ===
==== Round of 32 ====
4 December 2014 First leg	Rayo Vallecano	1–2	Valencia	Madrid
	Pozuelo (yellow card) 24'; Moreno 36'; Licá (yellow card) 61'	Report	Filipe Augusto (yellow card) 38'; Alcácer 70'; Yoel (yellow card) 83'; De Paul 85', (yellow card) 86'; Cancelo (yellow card) 87'	Stadium: Campo de Vallecas; Attendance: 8,551; Referee: Mario Melero López

16 December 2014 Second leg	Valencia	4–4 (6–5 agg.)	Rayo Vallecano	Valencia
	Alcácer 7', 65'; Gomes (yellow card) 19'; Morcillo 46' (o.g.); Parejo (yellow card) 67'; Rodrigo 71', (yellow card) 71' (red card) 80'; De Paul (yellow card) 86'	Report	Jozabed 20'; Pozuelo 23'; Baena (yellow card) 30'; Pereira 38', (yellow card) 38'; Nacho (yellow card) 45'; Toño (yellow card) 46'; Embarba 61'; Álvarez (yellow card) 71'; Morcillo (yellow card) 71'	Stadium: Mestalla; Attendance: 23,600; Referee: Santiago Jaime Latre
