= 2013–14 Rayo Vallecano season =

Rayo Vallecano
2013–14 season
- President: Raúl Martín Presa
- Head coach: Paco Jémez
- Stadium: Campo de Vallecas
- La Liga: 12th
- Copa del Rey: Round of 16
Home colours	Away colours	Third colours

The 2013–14 season was the 89th season in Rayo's history and the 15th in the top-tier.

== Squad ==
As June, 2014..

=== Squad and statistics ===
No.	Pos	Nat	Player	Total		Liga		Copa	
No.	Pos	Nat	Player	Apps	Goals	Apps	Goals	Apps	Goals
1	GK	(Spain) ESP	David Cobeño	8	0	5	0	3	0
2	DF	(Spain) ESP	Tito	25	0	24	0	1	0
3	DF	(Spain) ESP	Nacho	25	0	23	0	2	0
4	DF	(Spain) ESP	Raúl Baena	23	0	20	0	3	0
5	DF	(Spain) ESP	Álex Gálvez	30	2	26	2	4	0
7	MF	(Guinea) GUI	Lass Bangoura	31	0	28	0	3	0
8	MF	(Spain) ESP	Adrián	20	3	17	1	3	2
9	MF	(Spain) ESP	José Carlos	3	0	3	0	0	0
10	MF	(Spain) ESP	Roberto Trashorras	38	1	37	1	1	0
11	FW	(Mexico) MEX	Nery Castillo	15	2	11	2	4	0
12	FW	(Italy) ITA	Samuele Longo (on loan from Internazionale)	9	0	9	0	0	0
13	GK	(Spain) ESP	Rubén	35	0	34	0	1	0
14	MF	(Spain) ESP	Alberto Perea	10	1	8	1	2	0
15	DF	(Romania) ROU	Răzvan Raț	10	0	10	0	0	0
16	MF	(Spain) ESP	Rubén Rochina (on loan from Blackburn Rovers)	17	3	17	3	0	0
17	DF	(Argentina) ARG	Leonel Galeano	10	0	7	0	3	0
18	DF	(Portugal) POR	Zé Castro	20	0	19	0	1	0
19	MF	(Spain) ESP	Jonathan Viera (on loan from Valencia)	28	5	26	5	2	0
20	FW	(Argentina) ARG	Joaquín Larrivey	37	12	35	12	2	0
21	DF	(Spain) ESP	Anaitz Arbilla	32	1	30	1	2	0
22	MF	(Spain) ESP	Saúl (on loan from Atlético Madrid)	37	2	34	2	3	0
23	FW	(Spain) ESP	Alberto Bueno	41	12	37	11	4	1
24	MF	(Spain) ESP	Iago Falque (on loan from Tottenham Hotspur)	31	3	28	3	3	0
25	FW	(Uruguay) URU	Sebastián Fernández	9	1	9	1	0	0
26	DF	(Colombia) COL	Johan Mojica (on loan from Llaneros)	15	0	12	0	3	0
27	MF	(Peru) PER	Christian Cueva (on loan from Unión Española)	2	0	1	0	1	0
32	MF	(Spain) ESP	Adri Embarba	13	0	11	0	2	0
33	FW	(Spain) ESP	Rubén Ramiro	1	0	1	0	0	0
40	DF	(Spain) ESP	Borja López (on loan from Monaco)	3	0	3	0	0	0
6	DF	(Spain) ESP	Rodri	1	0	1	0	0	0
31	DF	(Spain) ESP	Mario	1	0	0	0	1	0

== Competitions ==
=== Overall ===
Competition	Started round	Final position / round	First match	Last match
La Liga	—	12th	19 August 2013	18 May 2014
Copa del Rey	Round of 32	Round of 16	6 December 2013	15 January 2014

Updated to match played June 2014
Source: Competitions

=== La Liga ===
==== League table ====
Pos	Team	Pld	W	D	L	GF	GA	GD	Pts
10	Levante	38	12	12	14	35	43	−8	48
11	Málaga	38	12	9	17	39	46	−7	45
12	Rayo Vallecano	38	13	4	21	46	80	−34	43
13	Getafe	38	11	9	18	35	54	−19	42
14	Espanyol	38	11	9	18	41	51	−10	42

Source: La Liga, ESPN
Rules for classification: 1st points; 2nd head-to-head points;

==== Matches ====
Kickoff times are in CET.

Win Draw Loss

19 August 2013 1	Rayo Vallecano	3–0	Elche	Madrid
20:00 CEST	Gálvez (yellow card) 8'; Bueno 36', 40', 74'; Perea 44'; Galeano (yellow card) 61'	Report	Săpunaru (yellow card) 13'; Aarón (yellow card) 51'	Stadium: Campo de Vallecas; Attendance: 9,000; Referee: David Fernández Borbalán

25 August 2013 2	Atlético Madrid	5–0	Rayo Vallecano	Madrid
19:00 CEST	García 17', 90'; Costa 20'; Turan 35'; Tiago 53'	Report	Nacho (yellow card) 72'	Stadium: Vicente Calderón; Attendance: 35,000; Referee: Ignacio Iglesias Villanueva

30 August 2013 3	Rayo Vallecano	1–2	Levante	Madrid
23:00 CEST	Adrián (yellow card) 55'; Bangoura (red card) 61'; Gálvez (yellow card) 68'; Bueno (yellow card) 79'; Larrivey 79'; Trashorras (yellow card) 84'	Report	García 26'; López (yellow card) 44'; Barral (yellow card) 56'; Juanfran (yellow card) 59'; Ivanschitz 90+4'	Stadium: Campo de Vallecas; Attendance: 8,890; Referee: Pedro Pérez Montero

15 September 2013 4	Málaga	5–0	Rayo Vallecano	Málaga
19:00 CEST	El Hamdaoui 31', 62', 67'; Portillo 40'; Eliseu (yellow card) 47', (goal) 48'; Antunes (yellow card) 57'	Report	Galeano (yellow card) 8'; Arbilla (yellow card) 62'	Stadium: La Rosaleda; Attendance: 24,800; Referee: Alejandro Hernández Hernández

21 September 2013 5	Rayo Vallecano	0–4	Barcelona	Madrid
20:00 CEST	Trashorras (yellow card) 23'; Baena (yellow card) 40'	Report	Adriano (yellow card) 32'; Pedro 33', 47', 72'; Fàbregas 79'	Stadium: Campo de Vallecas; Attendance: 12,000; Referee: Carlos Clos Gómez

25 September 2013 6	Sevilla	4–1	Rayo Vallecano	Seville
20:00 CEST	Rakitić 17' (pen.), 53'; Cala (yellow card) 45+1'; Marin (yellow card) 45+2'; Trochowski (yellow card) 78'; Bacca 80', 88'	Report	Arbilla (yellow card) 16'; Gálvez (yellow card) 52' (yellow-red card) 66'; Adrián 55'; Saúl (yellow card) 56'; Mojica (yellow card) 69'; Viera (red card) 82'; Bangoura (yellow card) 87'	Stadium: Ramón Sánchez Pizjuán; Attendance: 25,800; Referee: Antonio Mateu Lahoz

28 September 2013 7	Valencia	1–0	Rayo Vallecano	Valencia
16:00 CEST	Ruiz (yellow card) 14'; Pereira (yellow card) 31'; Jonas 37'; Cartabia (yellow card) 62'	Report	Baena (yellow card) 10'; Arbilla (yellow card) 42'; Adrián (yellow card) 62'; Saúl (yellow card) 76'; Castro (yellow card) 80'	Stadium: Mestalla; Attendance: 33,000; Referee: David Fernández Borbalán

5 October 2013 8	Rayo Vallecano	1–0	Real Sociedad	Madrid
18:00 CEST	Adrián (yellow card) 70'; Viera 89' (pen.), (yellow card) 90+4'	Report	Zurutuza (yellow card) 57'; Bravo (yellow card) 88'	Stadium: Vallecas; Attendance: 9,000; Referee: Xavier Estrada Fernández

20 October 2013 9	Almería	0–1	Rayo Vallecano	Almería
17:00 CEST	Pellerano (yellow card) 88'; Soriano (yellow card) 90+1'	Report	Bangoura (yellow card) 36'; Gálvez (yellow card) 44', (goal) 78'; Saúl (yellow card) 53' (yellow-red card) 64'; Tito (yellow card) 57'	Stadium: Mediterráneo; Attendance: 16,000; Referee: Carlos Delgado Ferreiro

25 October 2013 10	Rayo Vallecano	0–3	Valladolid	Madrid
21:00 CEST	Gálvez (yellow card) 39'; Bangoura (yellow card) 60'	Report	Baraja (yellow card) 7'; Ebert 31'; Guerra 39'; Larsson 48'; Manucho (yellow card) 72'	Stadium: Campo de Vallecas; Attendance: 11,539; Referee: Ignacio Iglesias Villanueva

30 October 2013 11	Osasuna	3–1	Rayo Vallecano	Pamplona
22:00 CEST	Oier 1'; Riera 13'; Torres 58'; De las Cuevas (red card) 66'	Report	Saúl (yellow card) 30'; Arbilla (yellow card) 60'; Gálvez 71'	Stadium: El Sadar; Attendance: 13,000; Referee: Miguel Ayza Gámez

2 November 2013 12	Rayo Vallecano	2–3	Real Madrid	Madrid
20:00 CET	Viera 53' (pen.), 55' (pen.); Nacho (yellow card) 59'; Tito (yellow card) 77'; Trashorras (yellow card) 88'	Report	Ronaldo 3', 48'; Carvajal (yellow card) 6'; Alonso (yellow card) 11'; Benzema 31'; Di María (yellow card) 62'; Marcelo (yellow card) 71'; Modrić (yellow card) 90+3'	Stadium: Campo de Vallecas; Attendance: 13,900; Referee: Alfonso Álvarez Izquierdo

9 November 2013 13	Celta Vigo	0–2	Rayo Vallecano	Vigo
22:00 CET	Nolito (yellow card) 30'; Oubiña (yellow card) 53'; Krohn-Dehli (yellow card) 86'	Report	Viera 24'; Gálvez (yellow card) 61'; Falque (yellow card) 66'; Larrivey 72'	Stadium: Balaídos; Attendance: 19,000; Referee: Fernando Teixeira Vitienes

24 November 2013 14	Rayo Vallecano	1–4	Espanyol	Madrid
17:00 CET	Viera (yellow card) 16'; Rubén (red card) 25'; Nacho (yellow card) 45+1'; Arbilla (yellow card) 50'; Saúl 81'	Report	Torje (yellow card) 21'; García 27', 51', 83'; Álvarez (yellow card) 62'; Córdoba (yellow card) 65'; Stuani 85'	Stadium: Campo de Vallecas; Attendance: 8,000; Referee: José González González

1 December 2013 15	Betis	2–2	Rayo Vallecano	Seville
12:00 CET	Amaya 27'; Sevilla (yellow card) 57'; Nono (yellow card) 78'; Chuli (yellow card) 80'; Verdú 81'	Report	Saúl (yellow card) 9'; Baena (yellow card) 24'; Larrivey (yellow card) 29'; Bueno 51', 90+1'; Viera (yellow card) 55'; Tito (yellow card) 90'	Stadium: Benito Villamarín; Attendance: 25,000; Referee: José Teixeira Vitienes

14 December 2013 16	Rayo Vallecano	0–2	Granada	Madrid
18:00 CET	Gálvez (yellow card) 12'; Galeano (yellow card) 23'; Nacho (yellow card) 37' (yellow-red card) 43'; Cobeño (yellow card) 44'; Larrivey (yellow card) 80'	Report	Rico 35', (yellow card) 77'; Piti (yellow card) 36'; Yebda (yellow card) 45+1'; Angulo (yellow card) 74'; Riki (yellow card) 83', (goal) 89'	Stadium: Campo de Vallecas; Attendance: 10,800; Referee: César Muñiz Fernández

22 December 2013 17	Athletic Bilbao	2–1	Rayo Vallecano	Bilbao
19:00 CET	San José 32'; Rico 66'	Report	Tito (yellow card) 49'; Bueno 61'; Adrián (yellow card) 86'	Stadium: San Mamés; Attendance: 29,200; Referee: Eduardo Prieto Iglesias

6 January 2014 18	Rayo Vallecano	2–5	Villarreal	Madrid
22:00 CET	Trashorras (yellow card) 35'; Rodri (yellow card) 45'; Mojica (yellow card) 49'; Castillo 66', 90+1' (pen.)	Report	Uche 10', 57', 64', (yellow card) 90+1'; Perbet 12', 41', (yellow card) 75'; Pina (yellow card) 78'	Stadium: Vallecas; Attendance: 8,000; Referee: Alejandro Hernández Hernández

12 January 2014 19	Getafe	0–1	Rayo Vallecano	Getafe
12:00 CET	Escudero (yellow card) 53'; Pedro León (yellow card) 61'; Lacen (yellow card) 80'; Gavilán (yellow card) 80'; Colunga (yellow card) 90+3'	Report	Bueno 29'; Nacho (yellow card) 59'	Stadium: Coliseum Alfonso Pérez; Attendance: 2,300; Referee: Carlos Clos Gómez

18 January 2014 20	Elche	2–0	Rayo Vallecano	Elche
18:00 CET	Albacar 19' (pen.), (yellow card) 45'; Márquez (yellow card) 57', (goal) 79'	Report	Baena (red card) 18'; Gálvez (yellow card) 65'; Adrián (yellow card) 71'	Stadium: Manuel Martínez Valero; Attendance: 19,500; Referee: Pedro Pérez Montero

26 January 2014 21	Rayo Vallecano	2–4	Atlético Madrid	Madrid
19:00 CET	Baena (yellow card) 26'; Viera 40'; Saúl (yellow card) 63'; Larrivey 76'	Report	Villa 8'; Turan 30', 44'; Manquillo (yellow card) 54'; Saúl 74' (o.g.)	Stadium: Campo de Vallecas; Attendance: 14,100; Referee: Alberto Undiano Mallenco

1 February 2014 22	Levante	0–0	Rayo Vallecano	Valencia
18:00 CET	Barral (yellow card) 43'; Simão Mate (yellow card) 77'	Report	Rochina (yellow card) 39'; Bangoura (yellow card) 69'; Tito (yellow card) 87'	Stadium: Ciutat de València; Attendance: 18,500; Referee: Ignacio Iglesias Villanueva

8 February 2014 23	Rayo Vallecano	4–1	Málaga	Madrid
18:00 CET	Falque 26', 63'; Arbilla 28'; Larrivey 45+1' (pen.); Saúl (yellow card) 52'; Nacho (yellow card) 62'; Arbilla (yellow card) 84'	Report	Sánchez (yellow card) 5' (yellow-red card) 45'; Antunes (yellow card) 16'; Pérez (yellow card) 30'; Camacho (yellow card) 51'; Yakovenko 72'	Stadium: Campo de Vallecas; Attendance: 11,000; Referee: Antonio Mateu Lahoz

15 February 2014 24	Barcelona	6–0	Rayo Vallecano	Barcelona
20:00 CET	Adriano 2'; Messi 36', 68'; Sánchez 53'; Pedro 56'; Neymar 89'	Report		Stadium: Camp Nou; Attendance: 74,517; Referee: Juan Martínez Munuera

23 February 2014 25	Rayo Vallecano	0–1	Sevilla	Madrid
12:00 CET	Falque (yellow card) 43'; Saúl (yellow card) 65'	Report	Fazio (yellow card) 24'; Iborra (yellow card) 36' (yellow-red card) 83'; Coke 57'	Stadium: Campo de Vallecas; Attendance: 13,800; Referee: Carlos Delgado Ferreiro

2 March 2014 26	Rayo Vallecano	1–0	Valencia	Madrid
21:00 CET	Tito (yellow card) 19'; Saúl (yellow card) 51'; Larrivey 61'; Trashorras (yellow card) 82'	Report	Portu (yellow card) 33'; Barragán (yellow card) 62' (yellow-red card) 76'	Stadium: Campo de Vallecas; Attendance: 13,650; Referee: Carlos Clos Gómez

10 March 2014 27	Real Sociedad	2–3	Rayo Vallecano	San Sebastián
22:00 CET	I. Martínez 2'; Pardo 45+1'	Report	Larrivey 4'; Gálvez (yellow card) 34'; Bueno 47'; Saúl (yellow card) 55'; Rochina 67'; Arbilla (yellow card) 77'	Stadium: Anoeta; Attendance: 17,500; Referee: Alfonso Álvarez Izquierdo

15 March 2014 28	Rayo Vallecano	3–1	Almería	Madrid
18:00 CET	Bueno 38'; Larrivey 57', 77'; Raț (yellow card) 67'	Report	Dubarbier (yellow card) 43'; Soriano 72'; Corona (yellow card) 79'; Rodri (yellow card) 79'	Stadium: Campo de Vallecas; Attendance: 11,500; Referee: Eduardo Prieto Iglesias

22 March 2014 29	Valladolid	1–1	Rayo Vallecano	Valladolid
20:00 CET	Castro 7' (o.g.); Rossi (yellow card) 13'; Mitrović (yellow card) 28'; Valiente (yellow card) 49'; Rubio (yellow card) 66'	Report	Bueno (yellow card) 10', (goal) 45'; Saúl (yellow card) 78'	Stadium: José Zorrilla; Attendance: 16,670; Referee: Antonio Mateu Lahoz

26 March 2014 30	Rayo Vallecano	1–0	Osasuna	Madrid
20:00 CET	Gálvez (yellow card) 77'; Bueno (yellow card) 79'; Larrivey 90' (pen.); Longo (yellow card) 90+3'	Report	Silva (yellow card) 33'; Damià (yellow card) 88'; Oier (yellow card) 89'; Arribas (yellow card) 90'; Puñal (yellow card) 90+3'	Stadium: Campo de Vallecas; Attendance: 10,330; Referee: Ignacio Iglesias Villanueva

29 March 2014 31	Real Madrid	5–0	Rayo Vallecano	Madrid
22:00 CET	Ronaldo 15'; Carvajal 55', (yellow card) 63'; Bale 68', 70'; Morata 78'	Report		Stadium: Santiago Bernabéu; Attendance: 60,174; Referee: Carlos Delgado Ferreiro

5 April 2014 32	Rayo Vallecano	3–0	Celta Vigo	Madrid
22:00 CEST	Rochina 26'; Gálvez (yellow card) 40'; Bueno 49', 60'; Raț (red card) 64'; Larrivey (yellow card) 73'	Report	Nolito (yellow card) 90+2'	Stadium: Campo de Vallecas; Attendance: 9,000; Referee: Pedro Pérez Montero

13 April 2014 33	Espanyol	2–2	Rayo Vallecano	Cornellà de Llobregat
21:00 CEST	Stuani 3'; Colotto 88'; Sidnei (yellow card) 90'	Report	Castro (yellow card) 29'; Falque 43'; Larrivey 50'; Rubén (yellow card) 65'; Trashorras (yellow card) 88'	Stadium: Cornellà-El Prat; Attendance: 16,110; Referee: Alberto Undiano Mallenco

20 April 2014 34	Rayo Vallecano	3–1	Betis	Madrid
17:00 CEST	Rochina 14'; Paulão 27' (o.g.); Castro (yellow card) 39'; Saúl (yellow card) 49'; Larrivey 51'; Gálvez (yellow card) 66'; Arbilla (yellow card) 69'	Report	Baptistão (yellow card) 63'; Chica 79'; Nono (yellow card) 85'	Stadium: Campo de Vallecas; Attendance: 10,800; Referee: Alejandro Hernández Hernández

26 April 2014 35	Granada	0–3	Rayo Vallecano	Granada
16:00 CEST	Recio (yellow card) 37'; Brahimi (yellow card) 41' (yellow-red card) 51'; El-Arabi (yellow card) 83'	Report	Nacho (yellow card) 15'; Castro (yellow card) 37'; Gálvez (yellow card) 41'; Saúl 54'; Larrivey 59'; Rochina (yellow card) 63'; Fernández 86'	Stadium: Los Cármenes; Attendance: 21,500; Referee: Antonio Mateu Lahoz

2 May 2014 36	Rayo Vallecano	0–3	Athletic Bilbao	Madrid
21:00 CEST	Saúl (yellow card) 46'; Larrivey (yellow card) 45+4'; Arbilla (yellow card) 50'; Castro (yellow card) 73'	Report	San José 20'; De Marcos 30'; Herrera 74'; Aduriz (yellow card) 76'	Stadium: Campo de Vallecas; Attendance: 12,500; Referee: David Fernández Borbalán

10 May 2014 37	Villarreal	4–0	Rayo Vallecano	Villarreal
20:00 CEST	Uche 22'; Bruno 42'; Pereira 55'; Costa 64'; Trigueros (yellow card) 71'	Report	Arbilla (red card) 63'; Gálvez (yellow card) 82'	Stadium: El Madrigal; Attendance: 13,492; Referee: José González González

18 May 2014 38	Rayo Vallecano	1–2	Getafe	Madrid
18:00 CEST	Galeano (yellow card) 27'; Cobeño (yellow card) 59'; Trashorras 67', (yellow card) 89'; Rubén (yellow card) 90+2'	Report	Lacen (yellow card) 23'; López (yellow card) 25'; Rafa (yellow card) 39'; Marica 43', 90+2' (pen.); Alexis (yellow card) 59'; Valera (yellow card) 64'; Mosquera (yellow card) 76'; Pedro León (yellow card) 88'	Stadium: Campo de Vallecas; Attendance: 8,356; Referee: Jesús Gil Manzano

=== Copa del Rey ===
==== Round of 32 ====
6 December 2013 First leg	Valladolid	0–0	Rayo Vallecano	Valladolid
22:00 CET	Rukavina (yellow card) 14'; Bergdich (yellow card) 58'; Rueda (yellow card) 82'; Guerra (yellow card) 88'	Report	Gálvez (yellow card) 21'; Arbilla (yellow card) 60'; Perea (yellow card) 62'	Stadium: José Zorrilla; Attendance: 7,037; Referee: Antonio Mateu Lahoz

19 December 2013 Second leg	Rayo Vallecano	3–1 (3–1 agg.)	Valladolid	Madrid
19:30 CET	Adrián 32', 87'; Saúl (yellow card) 38'; Bueno 90+2'	Report	Guerra 28', (red card) 48'; Manucho (yellow card) 45'; García (yellow card) 49'; Ebert (yellow card) 50'	Stadium: Campo de Vallecas; Attendance: 5,133; Referee: Xavier Estrada Fernández

==== Round of 16 ====
9 January 2014 First leg	Rayo Vallecano	0–0	Levante	Madrid
21:30 CET	Gálvez (yellow card) 59'; Mojica (yellow card) 80'; Galeano (yellow card) 88'	Report	Camarasa (yellow card) 22'; El Adoua (yellow card) 43'; Rodas (yellow card) 54'	Stadium: Campo de Vallecas; Attendance: 3,301; Referee: José Teixeira Vitienes

15 January 2014 Second leg	Levante	1–0 (1–0 agg.)	Rayo Vallecano	Valencia
21:30 CET	Barral (yellow card) 12', (goal) 43'; Nagore (yellow card) 82'; El Zhar (yellow card) 87'	Report	Galeano (yellow card) 37'; Falque (yellow card) 55'; Gálvez (yellow card) 59'	Stadium: Ciutat de València; Attendance: 7,500; Referee: David Fernández Borbalán
