= Mamadou Ba =

Senegalese footballer (born 1985)

Personal information
- Date of birth: 8 May 1985 (age 41)
- Place of birth: Dakar, Senegal
- Height: 1.98 m (6 ft 6 in)
- Position: Goalkeeper

Senior career*
Years	Team	Apps	(Gls)
2007–2012	ASC Jaraaf		
2012–2014	Oliveirense	11	(0)
2014–2017	Boavista	3	(0)
2017–2018	Ideal	13	(0)
2018–2019	Peniche	2	(0)
Total		29+	(0+)

International career
2009	Senegal	1	(0)
2009	Senegal A'	4	(0)
- * Club domestic league appearances and goals

Mamadou Ba (born 8 May 1985) is a Senegalese retired footballer who played as a goalkeeper. He earned one cap for the Senegal national team, won the 2010 Senegalese Ligue 1 title with ASC Jaraaf, and also played in the Primeira Liga during a playing career that spanned 13 years and five clubs.

== Coaching career ==
After retiring as a player, Ba remained in Portugal and turned to coaching. In March 2021, he was announced as the goalkeeping coach for Pedras Rubras, competing in the Divisão de Elite of the Porto Football Association. He spent the 2021–22 season in that role on the staff of manager Mário Seara.

== Personal life ==
Two of Ba's brothers also played professional football: both Abdoulaye and Pape Samba Ba earned caps for the Senegal national team.

== Honours ==
ASC Jaraaf

- Senegalese Ligue 1: 2010
- Senegal FA Cup: 2008, 2009

== See also ==
- List of foreign Primeira Liga players
