= David Cobeño =

Spanish footballer (born 1982)

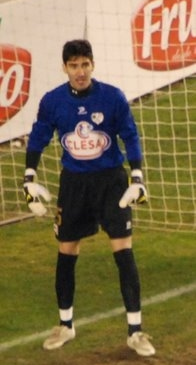
- Cobeño with Rayo Vallecano in 2009

Personal information
- Full name: David Cobeño Iglesias
- Date of birth: 6 April 1982 (age 44)
- Place of birth: Madrid, Spain
- Height: 1.89 m (6 ft 2 in)
- Position: Goalkeeper

Youth career
- 1997–2000: Rayo Vallecano

Senior career*
Years	Team	Apps	(Gls)
2000–2002	Rayo Vallecano B		
2002–2003	Ponferradina	3	(0)
2003–2005	Real Madrid C		
2005–2006	Real Madrid B	29	(0)
2006–2008	Sevilla	5	(0)
2007–2008	→ Almería (loan)	17	(0)
2008–2016	Rayo Vallecano	130	(1)
Total		184+	(1)
- * Club domestic league appearances and goals

David Cobeño Iglesias (Spanish pronunciation: [daˈβið koˈβeɲojˈɣlesjas]; born 6 April 1982) is a Spanish former professional footballer who played as a goalkeeper. He is currently director of football of La Liga club Rayo Vallecano.

== Playing career ==
Born in Madrid, Cobeño graduated from the youth academy of local Rayo Vallecano. After one season with lowly Ponferradina, he signed for Real Madrid, spending the 2005–06 campaign in the Segunda División with their reserves.

Cobeño joined Sevilla in summer 2006. Initially backing up Andrés Palop, he benefited from injury to his teammate during a 2–0 home win over Celta de Vigo on 18 March 2007 and went on to make four full additional appearances, adding three in the Andalusians' victorious run in the UEFA Cup.

For 2007–08, Cobeño was loaned to neighbouring – and La Liga newcomers – Almería. After starting the season as first-choice, he lost the job to Brazilian Diego Alves, only reappearing for two of the side's last three games; subsequently, he was released by Sevilla and returned to Rayo on a three-year deal, as the Madrid club promoted again to the second tier.

On 24 May 2009, Cobeño scored from his own goal to open an eventual 1–2 home loss against Elche. During the first season in his second spell, he was the team's undisputed starter as they retained their league status, and won the Ricardo Zamora Trophy at 38 goals conceded.

Cobeño remained the starter for Rayo in 2010–11, contributing 34 appearances to help the club to return to the top division following an eight-year absence. In June 2012, having failed to renew his contract, he moved abroad and signed for Vaslui from Romania but, unsettled, returned to the Campo de Fútbol de Vallecas two months later.

== Post-retirement ==
On 1 June 2016, aged 34, Cobeño retired and was immediately appointed as Rayo's director of football.

== Career statistics ==
Appearances and goals by club, season and competition
Club	Season	League			Copa del Rey		Europe		Other		Total	
Club	Season	Division	Apps	Goals	Apps	Goals	Apps	Goals	Apps	Goals	Apps	Goals
Real Madrid B	2005–06	Segunda División	29	0	—		—		—		29	0
Real Madrid	2005–06	La Liga	0	0	0	0	0	0	—		0	0
Sevilla	2006–07	La Liga	5	0	6	0	3 (Note: Appearances in UEFA Cup)	0	0	0	14	0
Almería (loan)	2007–08	La Liga	17	0	0	0	—		—		17	0
Rayo Vallecano	2008–09	Segunda División	40	1	1	0	—		—		41	1
Rayo Vallecano	2009–10	Segunda División	25	0	0	0	—		—		25	0
Rayo Vallecano	2010–11	Segunda División	34	0	0	0	—		—		34	0
Rayo Vallecano	2011–12	La Liga	15	0	0	0	—		—		15	0
Rayo Vallecano	2012–13	La Liga	8	0	2	0	—		—		10	0
Rayo Vallecano	2013–14	La Liga	5	0	3	0	—		—		8	0
Rayo Vallecano	2014–15	La Liga	3	0	1	0	—		—		4	0
Rayo Vallecano	2015–16	La Liga	0	0	0	0	—		—		0	0
Rayo Vallecano	Total		130	1	7	0	—		—		137	1
Career total			181	1	13	0	3	0	0	0	197	1

== Honours ==
Sevilla

- Copa del Rey: 2006–07
- UEFA Cup: 2006–07

Individual

- Ricardo Zamora Trophy (Segunda División): 2008–09
