= 2018–19 Rayo Vallecano season =

Rayo Vallecano
2018–19 season
- President: Raúl Martín Presa
- Head coach: Michel
- Stadium: Campo de Fútbol de Vallecas
- La Liga: 20th (relegated)
- Copa del Rey: Round of 32
| Home colours | Away colours | Third colours |

During the 2018–19 season, Rayo Vallecano participated in La Liga and the Copa del Rey.

== Players ==
As of 31 August 2018

Note: Flags indicate national team as defined under FIFA eligibility rules; some limited exceptions apply. Players may hold more than one non-FIFA nationality.

| No. | Pos. | Nation | Player |
|---|---|---|---|
| 1 | GK | ESP | Alberto García (vice-captain) |
| 2 | DF | ESP | Tito |
| 4 | MF | ESP | Álvaro Medrán (on loan from Valencia) |
| 5 | DF | ESP | José Antonio Dorado |
| 6 | MF | ESP | Gorka Elustondo |
| 7 | DF | ESP | Álex Moreno |
| 8 | FW | ARG | Óscar Trejo |
| 9 | FW | ESP | Raúl de Tomás (on loan from Real Madrid) |
| 10 | MF | COD | Gaël Kakuta |
| 11 | MF | ESP | Adri Embarba (captain) |
| 12 | MF | FRA | Giannelli Imbula (on loan from Stoke City) |
| 13 | GK | MKD | Stole Dimitrievski (on loan from Gimnàstic) |
| 14 | FW | POR | Bebé |

| No. | Pos. | Nation | Player |
|---|---|---|---|
| 15 | FW | ESP | Álex Alegría (on loan from Betis) |
| 16 | DF | ESP | Jordi Amat |
| 17 | DF | PER | Luis Advíncula (on loan from Tigres) |
| 18 | MF | ESP | Álvaro García |
| 19 | MF | GUI | Lass Bangoura |
| 20 | DF | URU | Emiliano Velázquez |
| 21 | DF | SEN | Abdoulaye Ba |
| 22 | MF | ESP | José Ángel Pozo |
| 23 | DF | ESP | Álex Gálvez |
| 24 | FW | ESP | Javi Guerra |
| 26 | DF | ESP | José León |
| 27 | MF | ESP | Santi Comesaña |
| 28 | DF | GEQ | Sergio Akieme |

=== Reserve team ===
Note: Flags indicate national team as defined under FIFA eligibility rules; some limited exceptions apply. Players may hold more than one non-FIFA nationality.

| No. | Pos. | Nation | Player |
|---|---|---|---|
| 29 | FW | ESP | Sergio Moreno |
| 30 | GK | ESP | Miguel Morro |

| No. | Pos. | Nation | Player |
|---|---|---|---|
| 31 | DF | ESP | Martín Pascual |
| 32 | MF | ESP | Javi Rubio |

=== Out on loan ===
Note: Flags indicate national team as defined under FIFA eligibility rules; some limited exceptions apply. Players may hold more than one non-FIFA nationality.

| No. | Pos. | Nation | Player |
|---|---|---|---|
| — | DF | ESP | Mario Fernández (at Recreativo until 30 June 2019) |
| — | MF | ESP | Joni Montiel (at Deportivo Fabril until 30 June 2019) |

| No. | Pos. | Nation | Player |
|---|---|---|---|
| — | FW | ESP | Joselillo (at Antequera until 30 June 2019) |
| — | FW | ESP | Sergio Benito (at Barakaldo until 30 June 2019) |

== Transfers ==
=== In ===
| Date | Player | From | Type | Fee | Ref |
|---|---|---|---|---|---|
| 29 May 2018 | (Spain) Alberto García | (Spain) Getafe | Transfer | Free | |
| 29 June 2018 | (Colombia) Johan Mojica | (Spain) Girona | Loan return | | |
| 30 June 2018 | (Guinea) Lass Bangoura | (Spain) Almería | Loan return | | |
| 30 June 2018 | (Spain) Nacho Monsalve | (Spain) Recreativo | Loan return | | |
| 30 June 2018 | (Spain) Javi Noblejas | (Spain) Córdoba | Loan return | | |
| 13 July 2018 | (Democratic Republic of the Congo) Gaël Kakuta | Hebei China Fortune | Transfer | €3,000,000 | |
| 23 July 2018 | (Uruguay) Emiliano Velázquez | (Spain) Atlético Madrid | Transfer | €1,000,000 | |
| 27 July 2018 | (Spain) José Ángel Pozo | (Spain) Almería | Transfer | €1,500,000 | |
| 29 July 2018 | (Peru) Luis Advíncula | (Mexico) Tigres UANL | Loan | | |
| 29 July 2018 | (Spain) Tito | (Spain) Leganés | Transfer | Free | |
| 9 August 2018 | (Spain) Jordi Amat | (Wales) Swansea City | Transfer | £900,000 | |
| 11 August 2018 | (Spain) Álvaro Medrán | (Spain) Valencia | Loan | | |
| 23 August 2018 | (Spain) Álvaro García | (Spain) Cádiz | Transfer | €5,000,000 | |
| 24 August 2018 | (Spain) Raúl de Tomás | (Spain) Real Madrid | Loan | | |
| 25 August 2018 | (Spain) José León | (Spain) Real Madrid Castilla | Transfer | Undisclosed | |
| 24 August 2018 | (France) Giannelli Imbula | (England) Stoke City | Loan | | |
| 31 August 2018 | (Spain) Álex Alegría | (Spain) Betis | Loan | | |
| 31 August 2018 | (Portugal) Bebé | (Spain) Eibar | Transfer | €750,000 | |
| 31 August 2018 | (North Macedonia) Stole Dimitrievski | (Spain) Gimnàstic | Loan | | |
| 31 August 2018 | (Spain) Álex Gálvez | (Spain) Eibar | Transfer | Free | |

=== Out ===
| Date | Player | To | Type | Fee | Ref |
|---|---|---|---|---|---|
| 29 May 2018 | (Spain) Alberto García | (Spain) Getafe | Loan return | | |
| 12 June 2018 | (Spain) Diego Aguirre | (Spain) Zaragoza | Transfer | Free | |
| 28 June 2018 | (Brazil) Baiano | (Turkey) Alanyaspor | Transfer | Free | |
| 29 June 2018 | (Colombia) Johan Mojica | (Spain) Girona | Transfer | €5,000,000 | |
| 30 June 2018 | (Saudi Arabia) Abdulmajeed Al-Sulayhem | (Saudi Arabia) Al-Shabab | Loan return | | |
| 30 June 2018 | (Portugal) Bebé | (Spain) Eibar | Loan return | | |
| 30 June 2018 | (Argentina) Francisco Cerro | TBD | | Free | |
| 30 June 2018 | (Argentina) Alejandro Domínguez | TBD | | Free | |
| 30 June 2018 | (Angola) Manucho | TBD | | Free | |
| 30 June 2018 | (Argentina) Emiliano Armenteros | TBD | | Free | |
| 30 June 2018 | (Spain) Raúl de Tomás | (Spain) Real Madrid | Loan return | | |
| 30 June 2018 | (Spain) Unai López | (Spain) Athletic Bilbao | Loan return | | |
| 30 June 2018 | (Uruguay) Emiliano Velázquez | (Spain) Atlético Madrid | Loan return | | |
| 13 July 2018 | (Spain) Ernesto Galán | (Spain) Rayo Majadahonda | Transfer | Free | |
| 31 July 2018 | (Spain) Antonio Amaya | (Spain) UCAM Murcia | Transfer | Free | |
| 1 August 2018 | (Spain) Fran Beltrán | (Spain) Celta Vigo | Transfer | €8,000,000 | |
| 3 August 2018 | (Spain) Mario Fernández | (Spain) Cartagena | Transfer | Free | |
| 3 August 2018 | (Spain) Nacho Monsalve | (Netherlands) Twente | Transfer | Free | |
| 20 August 2018 | (Spain) Javi Noblejas | (Spain) Sporting Gijón | Transfer | Free | |

== Competitions ==
=== Overall ===
| Competition | First match | Last match | Starting round | Final position | Record | | | | | | | |
| Competition | First match | Last match | Starting round | Final position | Pld | W | D | L | GF | GA | GD | Win % |
|---|---|---|---|---|---|---|---|---|---|---|---|---|
| La Liga | 19 August 2018 | 19 May 2019 | Matchday 1 | 20th | 38 | 8 | 8 | 22 | 41 | 70 | −29 | 21.05 |
| Copa del Rey | 30 October 2018 | 4 December 2018 | Round of 32 | Round of 32 | 2 | 0 | 1 | 1 | 2 | 3 | −1 | 0.00 |
| Total | | | | | 40 | 8 | 9 | 23 | 43 | 73 | −30 | 20.00 |

Last updated: 18 May 2019
Source: Competitions

=== La Liga ===
==== League table ====
| Pos | Team | Pld | W | D | L | GF | GA | GD | Pts | Qualification or relegation |
|---|---|---|---|---|---|---|---|---|---|---|
| 16 | Valladolid | 38 | 10 | 11 | 17 | 32 | 51 | −19 | 41 (Note: Valladolid finished ahead of Celta Vigo on head-to-head points: Celta Vigo 3–3 Valladolid, Valladolid 2–1 Celta Vigo.) | |
| 17 | Celta Vigo | 38 | 10 | 11 | 17 | 53 | 62 | −9 | 41 | |
| 18 | Girona (R) | 38 | 9 | 10 | 19 | 37 | 53 | −16 | 37 | Relegation to Segunda División |
| 19 | Huesca (R) | 38 | 7 | 12 | 19 | 43 | 65 | −22 | 33 | Relegation to Segunda División |
| 20 | Rayo Vallecano (R) | 38 | 8 | 8 | 22 | 41 | 70 | −29 | 32 | Relegation to Segunda División |

Source: La Liga, Soccerway
Rules for classification: 1) Points; 2) Head-to-head points; 3) Head-to-head goal difference; 4) Goal difference; 5) Goals scored; 6) Fair-play points (Note: Head-to-head record is used only after all the matches between the teams in question have been played)
(R) Relegated

==== Results summary ====
| Overall | | | | | | | | Home | | | | | | Away | | | | | |
| Pld | W | D | L | GF | GA | GD | Pts | W | D | L | GF | GA | GD | W | D | L | GF | GA | GD |
|---|---|---|---|---|---|---|---|---|---|---|---|---|---|---|---|---|---|---|---|
| 38 | 8 | 8 | 22 | 41 | 70 | −29 | 32 | 5 | 6 | 8 | 25 | 32 | −7 | 3 | 2 | 14 | 16 | 38 | −22 |

Last updated: 18 May 2019.
Source: Competitive matches

==== Results by round ====
| Round | 1 | 2 | 3 | 4 | 5 | 6 | 7 | 8 | 9 | 10 | 11 | 12 | 13 | 14 | 15 | 16 | 17 | 18 | 19 | 20 | 21 | 22 | 23 | 24 | 25 | 26 | 27 | 28 | 29 | 30 | 31 | 32 | 33 | 34 | 35 | 36 | 37 | 38 |
|---|---|---|---|---|---|---|---|---|---|---|---|---|---|---|---|---|---|---|---|---|---|---|---|---|---|---|---|---|---|---|---|---|---|---|---|---|---|---|
| Ground | H | A | H | A | H | A | H | A | H | A | H | H | A | H | A | A | H | A | H | H | A | H | A | H | A | H | A | A | H | A | H | A | H | A | H | A | H | A |
| Result | L | L | D | W | L | D | L | L | L | L | L | D | L | W | L | L | W | W | W | D | W | L | L | L | L | L | L | L | D | L | W | L | D | L | W | L | L | D |
| Position | 18 | 20 | 20 | 18 | 19 | 19 | 18 | 19 | 19 | 19 | 19 | 19 | 19 | 19 | 19 | 19 | 19 | 19 | 18 | 18 | 17 | 18 | 18 | 19 | 19 | 19 | 19 | 19 | 19 | 19 | 19 | 19 | 19 | 20 | 19 | 19 | 19 | 20 |

Source: Competitive matches
A = Away; H = Home; W = Win; D = Draw; L = Loss; P = Postponed

==== Matches ====
Win Draw Loss Fixtures

| 19 August 2018 1 | Rayo Vallecano | 1–4 | Sevilla | Madrid |
| 20:15 CEST (UTC+02:00) | Pozo (yellow card) 12'; Embarda 85' (pen.) | Report | Vázquez 15'; Silva 31', 45', 79' | Stadium: Campo de Fútbol de Vallecas; Attendance: 11,482; Referee: Antonio Mateu Lahoz |

| 25 August 2018 2 | Atlético Madrid | 1–0 | Rayo Vallecano | Madrid |
| 20:15 CEST (UTC+02:00) | Griezmann 63'; Koke (yellow card) 88' | Report | García (yellow card) 29' | Stadium: Wanda Metropolitano; Attendance: 52,568; Referee: José González González |

| 14 September 2018 4 | Huesca | 0–1 | Rayo Vallecano | Huesca |
| 21:00 CEST (UTC+02:00) | Ávila (yellow card) 79'; Luisinho (yellow card) 90+3' | Report | Imbula 29'; Amat (yellow card) 53' | Stadium: El Alcoraz; Attendance: 6,502; Referee: David Medié Jiménez |

| 22 September 2018 5 | Rayo Vallecano | 1–5 | Alavés | Madrid |
| 13:00 CEST (UTC+02:00) | De Tomás 30'; Ba (red card) 35'; Imbula (yellow card) 90+4' | Report | Navarro 8'; Duarte (yellow card) 23'; Ibai 34', 77'; Calleri 56'; Aguirregabiria (yellow card) 83'; Burgui 90+5' | Stadium: Vallecas; Attendance: 12,011; Referee: Adrián Cordero Vega |

| 25 September 2018 6 | Real Sociedad | 2–2 | Rayo Vallecano | San Sebastián |
| 21:00 CEST (UTC+02:00) | Bautista 5'; Zubeldia (yellow card) 15'; Moreno (yellow card) 77'; Willian José 78'; Merino (yellow card) 81'; Zaldúa (yellow card) 89' | Report | Advíncula 31', (yellow card) 61'; Trejo 36' (pen.), (yellow card) 90+1'; Kakuta (yellow card) 62' | Stadium: Anoeta; Attendance: 21,459; Referee: Juan Martínez Munuera |

| 28 September 2018 7 | Rayo Vallecano | 2–2 | Espanyol | Madrid |
| 21:00 CEST | De Tomás 6'; Kakuta 47' (pen.); Bebé (yellow card) 58'; Comesaña (yellow card) 64' | Report | Iglesias 19'; Granero 45' | Stadium: Vallecas; Attendance: 12,102; Referee: Javier Alberola Rojas |

| 6 October 2018 8 | Leganés | 1–0 | Rayo Vallecano | Leganés |
| 20:45 CEST (UTC+02:00) | Carrillo 14'; Óscar (yellow card) 43' | Report | Medrán (yellow card) 43' (yellow-red card) 82'; Embarba (yellow card) 55'; Ba (yellow card) 80' | Stadium: Municipal de Butarque; Attendance: 11,539; Referee: David Medié Jiménez |

| 21 October 2018 9 | Rayo Vallecano | 1–2 | Getafe | Madrid |
| 12:00 CEST (UTC+02:00) | Raúl de Tomás 74', (yellow card) 75'; Santi Comesaña (yellow card) 77'; Óscar Trejo (yellow card) 86' (yellow-red card); Jordi Amat (yellow card) 89' | Report | Cabrera (yellow card) 24'; Arambarri (yellow card) 47'; Foulquier 63'; Sergio Akieme 67' (o.g.); Antunes (yellow card) 77'; Suárez (yellow card) 81'; Mata (yellow card) 84' | Stadium: Vallecas; Attendance: 11,856; Referee: Mario Melero López |

| 24 October 2018 3 | Rayo Vallecano | 1–1 | Athletic Bilbao | Madrid |
| 19:00 CEST (UTC+02:00) | Pozo 23'; Imbula (yellow card) 59' | Report | Raúl García (yellow card) 53'; Muniain 66' | Stadium: Vallecas; Attendance: 11,850; Referee: Guillermo Cuadra Fernández |
Note: This match was originally scheduled to take place on 1 September, but later postponed because of Vallecas' safety concerns.

| 27 October 2018 10 | Girona | 2–1 | Rayo Vallecano | Girona |
| 13:00 CEST (UTC+02:00) | Portu 34' (pen.), 45'; Douglas Luiz (yellow card) 72'; Lorzano (red card) 88' | Report | Gálvez (yellow card) 33', (goal) 61'; Trejo (yellow card) 60'; Álex Moreno (yellow card) 73' | Stadium: Montilivi; Attendance: 6,618; Referee: José Luis Munuera Montero |

| 3 November 2018 11 | Rayo Vallecano | 2–3 | Barcelona | Madrid |
| 20:45 CET (UTC+01:00) | Amat (yellow card) 6'; Pozo 35'; De Tomás (yellow card) 49'; García 57'; García (yellow card) 89'; Velazquez (yellow card) 90+1' | Report | Suárez 11', 90'; Lenglet (yellow card) 17'; Alba (yellow card) 70'; Dembele 87' | Stadium: Vallecas; Attendance: 13,621; Referee: Alejandro Hernández Hernández |

| 11 November 2018 12 | Rayo Vallecano | 2–2 | Villarreal | Madrid |
| 18:30 CET (UTC+01:00) | Amat (yellow card) 44'; De Tomás 46'; García 66' | Report | Chukwueze 33'; Gonzalez (yellow card) 61' (yellow-red card) 90+1'; Sansone 80'; Trigueros (yellow card) 87' | Stadium: Vallecas; Attendance: 11,630; Referee: José Luis González González |

| 24 November 2018 13 | Valencia | 3–0 | Rayo Vallecano | Valencia |
| 16:15 CET (UTC+01:00) | Diakhaby (yellow card) 28'; Mina 35', 61'; Soler (yellow card) 74'; Gameiro 76' | Report | Advíncula (yellow card) 22' (yellow-red card) 87'; Comesaña (yellow card) 41'; Gálvez (yellow card) 51' | Stadium: Mestalla; Attendance: 37,949; Referee: Pablo González Fuertes |

| 30 November 2018 14 | Rayo Vallecano | 1–0 | Eibar | Madrid |
| 21:00 CET (UTC+01:00) | De Tomás (yellow card) 19'; Imbula (yellow card) 46'; Embarba 53'; Elustondo (yellow card) 67'; Trejo (yellow card) 75'; Álex Moreno (yellow card) 80' | Report | Diop (yellow card) 38'; Jordán (yellow card) 60'; Peña (yellow card) 65' | Stadium: Vallecas; Attendance: 11,257; Referee: Alberto Undiano Mallenco |

| 9 December 2018 15 | Real Betis | 2–0 | Rayo Vallecano | Seville |
| 20:45 CET (UTC+01:00) | Carvalho (yellow card) 31'; Barragán (yellow card) 58'; Lo Celso 59' (pen.); Sidnei 76' | Report | Comesaña (yellow card) 33'; Embarba (yellow card) 33'; Medrán (yellow card) 61'; Amat (yellow card) 90+3' | Stadium: Benito Villamarín; Attendance: 40,218; Referee: Juan Martínez Munuera |

| 15 December 2018 16 | Real Madrid | 1–0 | Rayo Vallecano | Madrid |
| 18:30 CET (UTC+01:00) | Benzema 13' | Report | Gálvez (yellow card) 39'; Bebé (yellow card) 64'; Imbula (yellow card) 83' | Stadium: Santiago Bernabéu; Attendance: 55,229; Referee: Ricardo de Burgos Bengoetxea |

| 23 December 2018 17 | Rayo Vallecano | 2–1 | Levante | Madrid |
| 18:30 CET (UTC+01:00) | Toño 23' (o.g.); De Tomás 67'; Imbula (yellow card) 90'; Dimitrievski (yellow card) 90+5' | Report | Postigo (yellow card) 58'; Rochina 60', (yellow card) 80' | Stadium: Vallecas; Attendance: 11,206; Referee: Ignacio Iglesias Villanueva |

| 5 January 2019 18 | Valladolid | 0–1 | Rayo Vallecano | Valladolid |
| 13:00 CET (UTC+01:00) | | Report | Medrán 1'; Embarba (yellow card) 56'; Trejo (yellow card) 59'; Bebé (yellow card) 65' | Stadium: José Zorrilla; Attendance: 17,261; Referee: Adrián Cordero Vega |

| 11 January 2019 19 | Rayo Vallecano | 4–2 | Celta Vigo | Madrid |
| 21:00 CET (UTC+01:00) | De Tomás 4', 37', 77'; Ba (yellow card) 16'; Advíncula (yellow card) 71'; Velázquez (yellow card) 80'; Bebé 90+1', (yellow card) 90+2' | Report | Araujo 13'; Gómez 18' (pen.); Méndez (yellow card) 19' | Stadium: Vallecas; Attendance: 11,465; Referee: Javier Alberola Rojas |

| 20 January 2019 20 | Rayo Vallecano | 2–2 | Real Sociedad | Madrid |
| 18:30 CET (UTC+01:00) | Comesaña 22'; Embarba 28'; Velázquez (yellow card) 76'; Dimitrievski (yellow card) 88' | Report | Moreno 39'; Willian José 82'; Llorente (yellow card) 87' | Stadium: Vallecas; Attendance: 12,562; Referee: David Medié Jiménez |

| 28 January 2019 21 | Alavés | 0–1 | Rayo Vallecano | Vitoria-Gasteiz |
| 21:00 CET (UTC+01:00) | Maripán (yellow card) 57'; Pacheco (yellow card) 84' | Report | De Tomás 47'; Moreno (yellow card) 69'; Imbula (yellow card) 84'; Comesaña (yellow card) 85'; Medrán (yellow card) 89'; Bebé (yellow card) 90+1' | Stadium: Mendizorrotza; Attendance: 13,982; Referee: Mario Melero López |

| 4 February 2019 22 | Rayo Vallecano | 1–2 | Leganés | Madrid |
| 21:00 CET (UTC+01:00) | Ba (yellow card) 1'; Amat (yellow card) 8'; Trejo (yellow card) 40'; Medrán (yellow card) 49'; Di Santo (yellow card) 73'; García 83'; Velázquez (yellow card) 90' | Report | Silva (yellow card) 13'; Braithwaite 36'; Bustinza (yellow card) 51'; Recio (yellow card) 54'; Nyom (red card) 58'; En-Nesyri 85'; Cuéllar (yellow card) 90+4' | Stadium: Vallecas; Attendance: 11,435; Referee: Juan Martínez Munuera |

| 9 February 2019 23 | Espanyol | 2–1 | Rayo Vallecano | Barcelona |
| 18:30 CET (UTC+01:00) | Iglesias 72' (pen.); Darder 90+5' | Report | Ba 33'; Velázquez (yellow card) 71'; Amat (yellow card) 77' | Stadium: RCDE Stadium; Attendance: 22,104; Referee: Eduardo Prieto Iglesias |

| 16 February 2019 24 | Rayo Vallecano | 0–1 | Atlético Madrid | Madrid |
| 16:15 CET (UTC+01:00) | | Report | Griezmann 74'; Giménez (yellow card) 90+2' | Stadium: Vallecas; Attendance: 13,880; Referee: Jesús Gil Manzano |

| 23 February 2019 25 | Getafe | 2–1 | Rayo Vallecano | Getafe |
| 13:00 CET (UTC+01:00) | Mata 28'; Antunes (yellow card) 32'; Molina 68'; Suárez (yellow card) 82' | Report | De Tomás 58'; Suárez (yellow card) 90' | Stadium: Coliseum Alfonso Pérez; Attendance: 11,207; Referee: Javier Alberola Rojas |

| 1 March 2019 26 | Rayo Vallecano | 0–2 | Girona | Madrid |
| 21:00 CET (UTC+01:00) | Suárez (yellow card) 6'; Ba (red card) 60'; Velázquez (yellow card) 75'; Comesaña (yellow card) 89' | Report | Stuani 30', 85'; Ramalho (yellow card) 64'; García (yellow card) 77'; Granell (yellow card) 84'; Alcalá (yellow card) 90+2' | Stadium: Vallecas; Attendance: 12,087; Referee: Santiago Jaime Latre |

| 9 March 2019 27 | Barcelona | 3–1 | Rayo Vallecano | Barcelona |
| 18:30 CET (UTC+01:00) | Piqué 38'; Messi 51' (pen.); Busquets (yellow card) 79'; Suárez 82' | Report | De Tomás 24'; Velázquez (yellow card) 68'; Imbula (yellow card) 89' | Stadium: Camp Nou; Attendance: 74,158; Referee: Mario Melero López |

| 17 March 2019 28 | Villarreal | 3–1 | Rayo Vallecano | Villarreal |
| 18:30 CET (UTC+01:00) | Funes Mori (yellow card) 44'; Toko Ekambi 50', 52'; Ruiz (yellow card) 79'; Álvaro (yellow card) 82'; Gerard 88' | Report | Suárez 20'; Velázquez (yellow card) 51'; Gálvez (yellow card) 66'; Amat (yellow card) 82' | Stadium: Estadio de la Cerámica; Attendance: 17,117; Referee: José Luis González González |

| 31 March 2019 29 | Rayo Vallecano | 1–1 | Real Betis | Madrid |
| 14:00 CEST (UTC+02:00) | Suárez (yellow card) 30'; De Tomás 34'; Tito (yellow card) 52'; Medrán (yellow card) 61'; Bebé (yellow card) 70'; Amat (yellow card) 90'; Di Santo (red card) 90+5' | Report | Emerson (yellow card) 50'; Carvalho (yellow card) 57'; Tello 81'; Loren (yellow card) 87' | Stadium: Vallecas; Attendance: 12,105; Referee: Antonio Mateu Lahoz |

| 3 April 2019 30 | Eibar | 2–1 | Rayo Vallecano | Eibar |
| 20:30 CEST (UTC+02:00) | Diop (yellow card) 51'; Charles 64'; León 73'; Peña (yellow card) 74' | Report | Pozo 40'; Moreno (yellow card) 76'; Amat (yellow card) 86' | Stadium: Ipurua; Attendance: 3,940; Referee: Alberto Undiano Mallenco |

| 6 April 2019 31 | Rayo Vallecano | 2–0 | Valencia | Madrid |
| 18:30 CEST (UTC+02:00) | De Tomás (yellow card) 14', (goal) 32'; Gálvez (yellow card) 55'; Suárez 90+1' | Report | Torres (yellow card) 29'; Roncaglia (yellow card) 76'; Diakhaby (yellow card) 84' | Stadium: Vallecas; Attendance: 11,320; Referee: Javier Alberola Rojas |

| 14 April 2019 32 | Athletic Bilbao | 3–2 | Rayo Vallecano | Bilbao |
| 14:00 CEST (UTC+02:00) | Williams 2', 50', (yellow card) 90+5'; García 72' | Report | Moreno 45'; Advíncula (yellow card) 49' (yellow-red card) 52'; Ba (yellow card) 68'; De Tomás 85' | Stadium: San Mamés; Attendance: 38,732; Referee: Juan Martínez Munuera |

| 20 April 2019 33 | Rayo Vallecano | 0–0 | Huesca | Madrid |
| 18:30 CEST (UTC+02:00) | Medrán (yellow card) 45'; Tito (yellow card) 45'; Pozo (yellow card) 66'; De Tomás (yellow card) 86' | Report | Gallego (yellow card) 47'; Melero (yellow card) 62' | Stadium: Vallecas; Attendance: 10,542; Referee: José Luis González González |

| 25 April 2019 34 | Sevilla | 5–0 | Rayo Vallecano | Seville |
| 19:30 CEST (UTC+02:00) | Banega (yellow card) 31'; Promes 55'; Munir 57', 62'; Ben Yedder 70'; Gil 86' | Report | Gálvez (yellow card) 33'; Pozo (yellow card) 52' | Stadium: Ramón Sánchez Pizjuán; Attendance: 32,636; Referee: Guillermo Cuadra Fernández |

| 28 April 2019 35 | Rayo Vallecano | 1–0 | Real Madrid | Madrid |
| 20:45 CEST (UTC+02:00) | Embarba 23' (pen.); Suárez (yellow card) 43'; Uche (yellow card) 90+3' | Report | Vallejo (yellow card) 22'; Modrić (yellow card) 28'; Mariano (yellow card) 62'; Carvajal (yellow card) 79'; Marcelo (yellow card) 86' | Stadium: Vallecas; Attendance: 13,273; Referee: Pablo González Fuertes |

| 4 May 2019 36 | Levante | 4–1 | Rayo Vallecano | Valencia |
| 13:00 CEST (UTC+02:00) | Campaña 14', (yellow card) 85'; Vezo 43'; Jason 85'; Bardhi 90' | Report | Medrán (yellow card) 58'; Suárez (yellow card) 68'; García 71'; Embarba (yellow card) 78' (yellow-red card) 82' | Stadium: Ciutat de València; Attendance: 19,868; Referee: Xavier Estrada Fernández |

| 12 May 2019 37 | Rayo Vallecano | 1–2 | Valladolid | Madrid |
| 18:30 CEST (UTC+02:00) | Moreno (yellow card) 69'; Medrán 73'; Pozo (yellow card) 76' | Report | Ünal 6' (pen.); Kiko (yellow card) 77'; Guardiola 80'; Calero (yellow card) 86' | Stadium: Vallecas; Attendance: 10,040; Referee: José María Sánchez Martínez |

| 18 May 2019 38 | Celta Vigo | 2–2 | Rayo Vallecano | Vigo |
| 20:45 CEST (UTC+02:00) | Aspas 82', 90+2' | Report | Uche (yellow card) 4'; Embarba 29' (pen.); García (yellow card) 39'; Medrán 71'; Catena (yellow card) 79'; Dimitrievski (yellow card) 85' | Stadium: Abanca-Balaídos; Attendance: 21,607; Referee: Antonio Mateu Lahoz |

=== Copa del Rey ===
==== Round of 32 ====
| 30 October 2018 First leg | Leganés | 2–2 | Rayo Vallecano | Leganés |
| 20:30 CET (UTC+01:00) | En-Nesyri 31', 72' | Report | Medrán 15'; Alegría 21'; Ba (yellow card) 90+3' | Stadium: Butarque; Attendance: 5,872; Referee: Alberto Undiano Mallenco |

| 4 December 2018 Second leg | Rayo Vallecano | 0–1 (2–3 agg.) | Leganés | Madrid |
| 20:30 CET (UTC+01:00) | Tito (yellow card) 21'; De Tomás (yellow card) 71' | Report | Velázquez 17' (o.g.); Tarín (yellow card) 35'; Gumbau (yellow card) 50'; Lunin (yellow card) 69'; Omeruo (yellow card) 81' | Stadium: Campo de Fútbol de Vallecas; Attendance: 8,372; Referee: Alejandro Hernández Hernández |

== Statistics ==
=== Appearances and goals ===
Last updated on 8 March 2019.

| No. | Pos | Nat | Player | Total | | La Liga | | Copa del Rey | |
| No. | Pos | Nat | Player | Apps | Goals | Apps | Goals | Apps | Goals |
Goalkeepers
| 1 | GK | (Spain) ESP | Alberto García | 12 | 0 | 11 | 0 | 1 | 0 |
| 13 | GK | (North Macedonia) MKD | Stole Dimitrievski | 16 | 0 | 15 | 0 | 1 | 0 |
| 30 | GK | (Spain) ESP | Miguel Morro | 0 | 0 | 0 | 0 | 0 | 0 |
Defenders
| 2 | DF | (Spain) ESP | Tito | 7 | 0 | 4+2 | 0 | 1 | 0 |
| 5 | DF | (Spain) ESP | Catena | 0 | 0 | 0 | 0 | 0 | 0 |
| 7 | DF | (Spain) ESP | Alexandre Moreno | 25 | 0 | 25 | 0 | 0 | 0 |
| 16 | DF | (Spain) ESP | Jordi Amat | 25 | 0 | 25 | 0 | 0 | 0 |
| 17 | DF | (Peru) PER | Luis Advíncula | 24 | 1 | 22+1 | 1 | 1 | 0 |
| 20 | DF | (Uruguay) URU | Emiliano Velázquez | 15 | 0 | 10+3 | 0 | 2 | 0 |
| 21 | DF | (Senegal) SEN | Abdoulaye Ba | 19 | 1 | 17+1 | 1 | 1 | 0 |
| 23 | DF | (Spain) ESP | Álex Gálvez | 11 | 1 | 10 | 1 | 0+1 | 0 |
| 28 | DF | (Spain) ESP | Sergio Akieme | 1 | 0 | 1 | 0 | 0 | 0 |
Midfielders
| 4 | MF | (Spain) ESP | Álvaro Medrán | 13 | 1 | 6+6 | 1 | 1 | 0 |
| 6 | MF | (Spain) ESP | Gorka Elustondo | 5 | 0 | 3+2 | 0 | 0 | 0 |
| 10 | MF | (Democratic Republic of the Congo) COD | Gaël Kakuta | 10 | 1 | 9+1 | 1 | 0 | 0 |
| 11 | MF | (Spain) ESP | Adri Embarba | 26 | 3 | 21+5 | 3 | 0 | 0 |
| 12 | MF | (France) FRA | Giannelli Imbula | 22 | 1 | 19+1 | 1 | 2 | 0 |
| 15 | MF | (Spain) ESP | Mario Suárez | 4 | 0 | 2+2 | 0 | 0 | 0 |
| 18 | MF | (Spain) ESP | Álvaro García | 25 | 4 | 10+13 | 3 | 1+1 | 1 |
| 22 | MF | (Spain) ESP | José Ángel Pozo | 19 | 2 | 6+11 | 2 | 2 | 0 |
| 27 | MF | (Spain) ESP | Santi Comesaña | 22 | 1 | 22 | 1 | 0 | 0 |
| 32 | MF | (Spain) ESP | Javi Rubio | 0 | 0 | 0 | 0 | 0 | 0 |
Forwards
| 8 | FW | (Argentina) ARG | Óscar Trejo | 24 | 1 | 22+1 | 1 | 1 | 0 |
| 9 | FW | (Spain) ESP | Raúl de Tomás | 24 | 10 | 22+1 | 10 | 0+1 | 0 |
| 14 | FW | (Portugal) POR | Bebé | 18 | 1 | 3+13 | 1 | 2 | 0 |
| 24 | FW | (Spain) ESP | Javi Guerra | 2 | 0 | 0+2 | 0 | 0 | 0 |
| 25 | FW | (Argentina) ARG | Franco Di Santo | 3 | 0 | 0+2 | 0 | 1 | 0 |
| 29 | FW | (Spain) ESP | Sergio Moreno | 1 | 0 | 0+1 | 0 | 0 | 0 |
Players who have made an appearance this season but have left the club
| 5 | DF | (Spain) ESP | José Antonio Dorado | 3 | 0 | 1 | 0 | 2 | 0 |
| 15 | FW | (Spain) ESP | Álex Alegría | 11 | 1 | 0+9 | 0 | 2 | 1 |
| 19 | MF | (Guinea) GUI | Lass Bangoura | 1 | 0 | 0 | 0 | 0+1 | 0 |
| 26 | DF | (Spain) ESP | José León | 0 | 0 | 0 | 0 | 0 | 0 |
