= Abdoulaye Ba =

Senegalese footballer (born 1991)

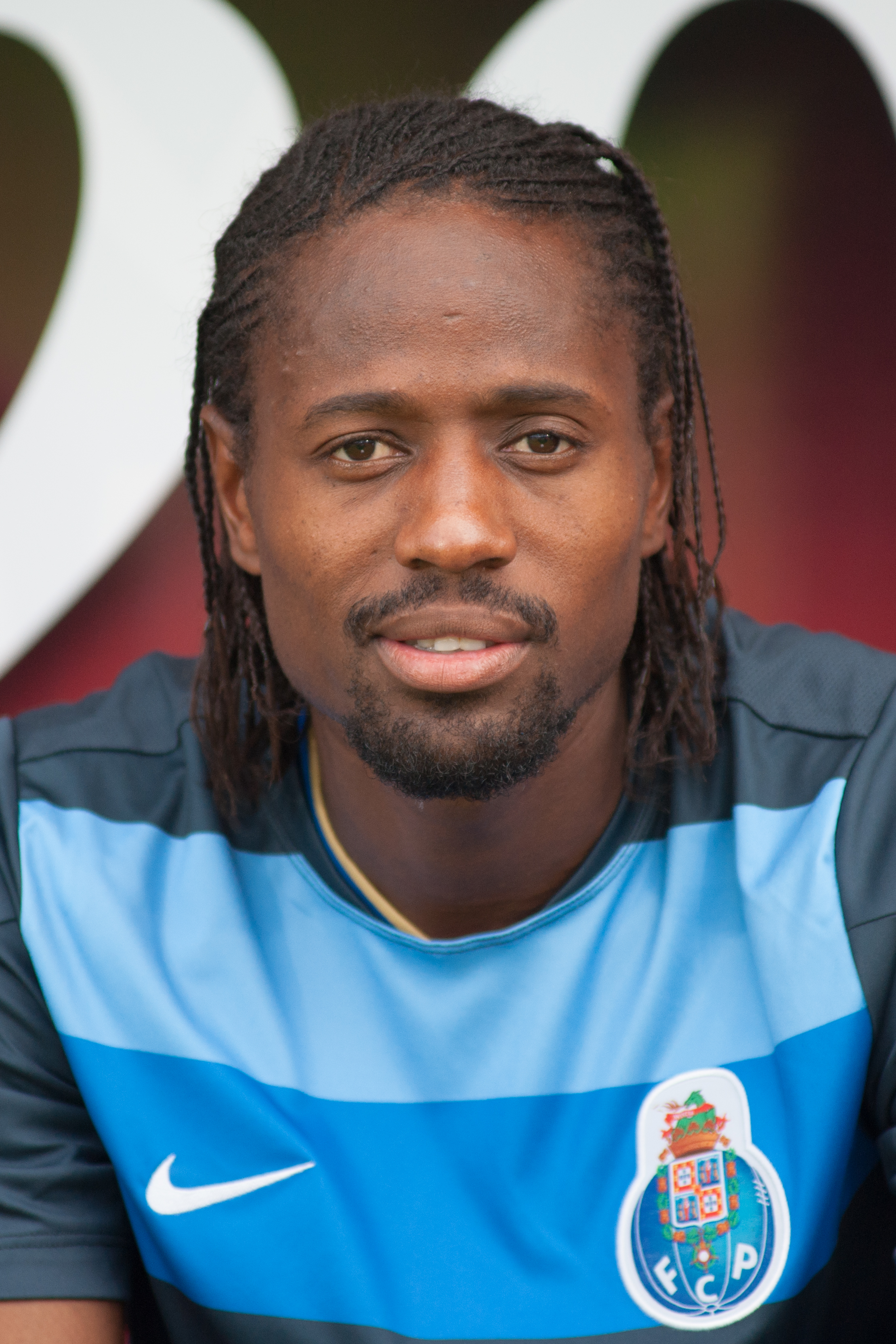
- Ba with Porto in 2013

Personal information
- Full name: Abdoulaye Ba
- Date of birth: 1 January 1991 (age 35)
- Place of birth: Saint-Louis, Senegal
- Height: 1.97 m (6 ft 6 in)
- Position: Centre-back

Youth career
- ASC Linguère
- 2008–2010: Porto

Senior career*
| Years | Team | Apps | (Gls) |
| 2010–2017 | Porto | 15 | (0) |
| 2010–2011 | → Covilhã (loan) | 24 | (9) |
| 2011–2012 | → Académica (loan) | 21 | (1) |
| 2012–2013 | Porto B | 9 | (2) |
| 2013–2014 | → Vitória Guimarães (loan) | 6 | (0) |
| 2014–2015 | → Rayo Vallecano (loan) | 20 | (0) |
| 2015–2016 | → Fenerbahçe (loan) | 6 | (1) |
| 2016 | → Alanyaspor (loan) | 10 | (1) |
| 2017 | → 1860 Munich (loan) | 15 | (3) |
| 2017–2020 | Rayo Vallecano | 44 | (1) |
| 2020 | → Deportivo La Coruña (loan) | 3 | (0) |
| 2020 | Dinamo București | 3 | (0) |
| 2021 | Moreirense | 13 | (0) |
| 2021–2022 | Arouca | 20 | (0) |
| 2022–2023 | Sabah | 22 | (2) |
| 2023–2024 | Tondela | 23 | (2) |
| 2024–2025 | Al-Faisaly | 20 | (3) |

International career
| 2011–2012 | Senegal U23 | 4 | (1) |
| 2012–2013 | Senegal | 6 | (0) |
- * Club domestic league appearances and goals as of 19:09, 16 February 2026 (UTC)

Abdoulaye Ba (born 1 January 1991) is a Senegalese professional footballer who plays as a centre-back.

== Club career ==
Born in Saint-Louis, Ba joined FC Porto's academy in 2008, aged 17. He spent his first two seasons as a senior on loan to two other Portuguese clubs, S.C. Covilhã in the Segunda Liga and Académica de Coimbra of the Primeira Liga. He made his debut in the latter competition on 15 August 2011 in a 2–1 away win over U.D. Leiria, also playing the full 90 minutes against Sporting CP in the final of the Taça de Portugal, which ended 1–0 for the Students.

In September 2012, Porto bought back 25% of Ba's economic rights for €750,000 from investor "Pearl Design Holding Limited", with his value being estimated at €3 million at that time. He made his first league appearance for the Dragons on 2 November of that year, coming on as a substitute for the injured Maicon in the first half of an eventual 5–0 home victory over C.S. Marítimo.

Ba was sent off for two bookable offences in the final of the Taça da Liga against S.C. Braga on 13 April 2013, the second of which also resulted in a penalty and the game's only goal, scored by Alan in the last minute of the first half. On 3 September, he moved to fellow top-division team Vitória S.C. for one year.

On 1 February 2014, Ba returned to Porto after appearing sparingly with the Minho Province side. On 4 August, he joined La Liga's Rayo Vallecano also in a temporary deal. In the following summer more of the same, as he moved to Fenerbahçe SK.

For 2016–17, Ba continued in the Turkish Süper Lig, joining Alanyaspor also on loan. After a spell at TSV 1860 Munich marred by injury problems, even though he was first choice when available, he returned to Rayo on 30 August 2017 after agreeing to a four-year contract.

Ba returned to the Spanish second tier on 11 March 2020, signing for Deportivo de La Coruña on a short loan due to Michele Somma's serious injury. On 8 October, he joined Romanian Liga I club FC Dinamo București on a one-year deal, leaving however after only two months.

Ba settled rarely the following years, representing in quick succession Moreirense FC, F.C. Arouca (both in the Portuguese top flight), Sabah FC (Azerbaijan Premier League), C.D. Tondela (Portugal, division two) and Al-Faisaly FC (Saudi First Division League).

== International career ==
Ba represented Senegal at the 2012 Summer Olympics. He had won his first cap for the full side on 29 February of that year, in a 0–0 friendly draw with South Africa.

== Personal life ==
Ba's older brothers, Mamadou and Pape Samba, were also footballers.

== Career statistics ==
=== Club ===
As of match played 28 May 2023

Appearances and goals by club, season and competition
| Club | Season | League | | | National cup (Note: Includes Taça de Portugal, Copa del Rey, Turkish Cup, DFB-Pokal and Azerbaijan Cup) | | League cup (Note: Includes Taça da Liga) | | Continental | | Other | | Total | |
| Club | Season | Division | Apps | Goals | Apps | Goals | Apps | Goals | Apps | Goals | Apps | Goals | Apps | Goals |
|---|---|---|---|---|---|---|---|---|---|---|---|---|---|---|
| Covilhã (loan) | 2010–11 | Liga de Honra | 24 | 9 | — | | 3 | 0 | — | | — | | 27 | 9 |
| Académica (loan) | 2011–12 | Primeira Liga | 22 | 1 | 4 | 1 | — | | — | | — | | 26 | 2 |
| Porto | 2012–13 | Primeira Liga | 6 | 0 | 2 | 0 | 3 | 0 | 3 (Note: Appearances in UEFA Champions League) | 0 | — | | 14 | 0 |
| Porto | 2013–14 | Primeira Liga | 9 | 0 | — | | — | | — | | — | | 9 | 0 |
| Porto | Total | 15 | 0 | 2 | 0 | 3 | 0 | 3 | 0 | — | | 23 | 0 | |
| Porto B | 2012–13 | Segunda Liga | 9 | 2 | — | | — | | — | | — | | 9 | 2 |
| Vitória Guimarães (loan) | 2013–14 | Primeira Liga | 6 | 0 | — | | 1 | 0 | 5 (Note: Appearances in UEFA Europa League) | 1 | — | | 12 | 1 |
| Rayo Vallecano (loan) | 2014–15 | La Liga | 20 | 0 | — | | — | | — | | — | | 20 | 0 |
| Fenerbahçe (loan) | 2015–16 | Süper Lig | 6 | 1 | 7 | 0 | — | | 5 | 0 | — | | 18 | 1 |
| Alanyaspor (loan) | 2016–17 | Süper Lig | 10 | 1 | — | | — | | — | | — | | 10 | 1 |
| 1860 Munich (loan) | 2016–17 | 2. Bundesliga | 15 | 3 | 1 | 0 | — | | — | | 2 (Note: Appearances in 2. Bundesliga relegation play-offs) | 0 | 18 | 3 |
| Rayo Vallecano | 2017–18 | Segunda División | 18 | 0 | 0 | 0 | — | | — | | — | | 18 | 0 |
| Rayo Vallecano | 2018–19 | La Liga | 26 | 1 | 1 | 0 | — | | — | | — | | 27 | 1 |
| Rayo Vallecano | Total | | 44 | 1 | 1 | 0 | — | | — | | — | | 45 | 1 |
| Deportivo (loan) | 2019–20 | Segunda División | 3 | 0 | — | | — | | — | | — | | 3 | 0 |
| Dinamo București | 2020–21 | Liga I | 3 | 0 | — | | — | | — | | — | | 3 | 0 |
| Moreirense | 2020–21 | Primeira Liga | 12 | 0 | — | | — | | — | | — | | 12 | 0 |
| Moreirense | 2021–22 | Primeira Liga | 1 | 0 | — | | — | | — | | — | | 1 | 0 |
| Moreirense | Total | | 13 | 0 | — | | — | | — | | — | | 13 | 0 |
| Arouca | 2021–22 | Primeira Liga | 20 | 0 | — | | — | | — | | — | | 20 | 0 |
| Sabah | 2022–23 | Azerbaijan Premier League | 22 | 2 | 1 | 0 | — | | — | | — | | 23 | 2 |
| Career Total | | | 232 | 20 | 16 | 1 | 7 | 0 | 13 | 1 | 2 | 0 | 270 | 22 |

=== International ===
Appearances and goals by national team and year
| National team | Year | Apps | Goals |
|---|---|---|---|
| Senegal | 2012 | 5 | 0 |
| Senegal | 2013 | 1 | 0 |
| Total | | 6 | 0 |

== Honours ==
Académica

- Taça de Portugal: 2011–12

Porto

- Primeira Liga: 2012–13
- Taça da Liga runner-up: 2012–13

Rayo Vallecano

- Segunda División: 2017–18
