= Álex Gálvez =

Spanish footballer

Personal information
- Full name: Alejandro Gálvez Jimena
- Date of birth: 6 June 1989 (age 37)
- Place of birth: Granada, Spain
- Height: 1.88 m (6 ft 2 in)
- Position: Centre-back

Team information
- Current team: Arenas

Youth career
- 2004–2007: Albacete
- 2007–2008: Villarreal

Senior career*
Years	Team	Apps	(Gls)
2008–2009	Villarreal C	0	(0)
2008–2009	→ Onda (loan)	26	(3)
2009–2010	Villanovense	31	(3)
2010–2012	Sporting Gijón B	51	(4)
2011–2012	Sporting Gijón	12	(2)
2012–2014	Rayo Vallecano	54	(2)
2014–2016	Werder Bremen	41	(2)
2016–2018	Eibar	23	(1)
2018	→ Las Palmas (loan)	18	(0)
2018–2019	Rayo Vallecano	17	(1)
2019–2021	Qatar SC	35	(1)
2021–2023	Ibiza	21	(0)
2023	Al-Khor	6	(0)
2023–2024	Recreativo	31	(1)
2025–	Arenas	27	(3)
- * Club domestic league appearances and goals as of 12:01, 14 July 2026 (UTC)

Alejandro "Álex" Gálvez Jimena (born 6 June 1989) is a Spanish professional footballer who plays for Tercera Federación club Arenas CD. Mainly a central defender, he can also play as a defensive midfielder.

== Career ==
=== Early career ===
Born in Granada, Andalusia, Gálvez played youth football for Albacete Balompié and Villarreal CF. He was loaned by the latter to farm team CD Onda in the Tercera División, in what was his senior debut.

In the following two seasons, Gálvez played in the Segunda División B with CF Villanovense and Sporting de Gijón's reserves, being relegated on both occasions but reinstated in 2010–11.

=== Sporting Gijón ===
On 13 December 2011, Gálvez made his debut with Sporting's main squad in a Copa del Rey match against RCD Mallorca (1–0 away win, 2–1 aggregate loss). The following 15 January, again as a starter and a stopper, he made his first La Liga appearance for the Asturians, scoring the first goal of the game in an eventual 2–1 home victory over Málaga CF.

=== Rayo Vallecano ===
Gálvez agreed to terms with Rayo Vallecano on 18 July 2012, on a two-year deal. He scored his first official goal for his new team on 20 October 2013, from a 30-metre free kick for the match's only at UD Almería.

In late May 2013, the Madrid outskirts club rejected a €2 million offer from Borussia Dortmund for Gálvez's playing rights.

=== Werder Bremen ===
On 13 May 2014, after consecutively helping Rayo retain their top-flight status, free agent Gálvez signed a three-year contract with SV Werder Bremen in Germany. For most of the first half of his first season he was deployed in defensive midfield by coach Robin Dutt, but under the former's successor Viktor Skrypnyk he became a constant in the centre of defence, until injuries limited him to five appearances from January to May 2015.

Continuing injury problems over the summer break proved detrimental to pre-season training for Gálvez, as he was mostly used as a backup for Assani Lukimya at the beginning of the 2015–16 campaign.

=== Eibar ===
On 3 August 2016, Gálvez agreed to a three-year deal with SD Eibar in the Spanish top division. Mostly a backup option in his early spell, he was loaned to fellow league club UD Las Palmas on 29 December 2017.

Gálvez terminated his contract on 30 August 2018.

=== Return to Rayo ===
On 31 August 2018, one day after becoming a free agent, Gálvez returned to former club Rayo Vallecano after agreeing to a one-year contract. He started in all his league appearances, scoring in a 2–1 away defeat to Girona FC in an eventual relegation as last.

=== Ibiza ===
On 22 July 2021, after two years abroad with Qatar SC, Gálvez signed for two seasons with second-tier newcomers UD Ibiza. He missed the first months of his first due to a meniscus injury, and was sent off twice shortly after returning.

== Career statistics ==
As of match played 1 July 2022

Appearances and goals by club, season and competition
Club	Season	League			National cup		Other		Total	
Club	Season	Division	Apps	Goals	Apps	Goals	Apps	Goals	Apps	Goals
Villanovense	2009–10	Segunda División B	31	3	0	0	—		31	3
Sporting Gijón B	2010–11	Segunda División B	34	3	—		—		34	3
Sporting Gijón B	2011–12	Segunda División B	17	1	—		—		17	1
Sporting Gijón B	Total		51	4	0	0	0	0	51	1
Sporting Gijón	2011–12	La Liga	12	2	2	0	—		14	2
Rayo Vallecano	2012–13	La Liga	28	0	2	0	—		30	0
Rayo Vallecano	2013–14	La Liga	26	2	4	0	—		30	2
Rayo Vallecano	Total		54	2	6	0	0	0	60	2
Werder Bremen	2014–15	Bundesliga	20	1	2	0	—		22	1
Werder Bremen	2015–16	Bundesliga	21	1	3	0	—		24	1
Werder Bremen	Total		41	2	5	0	0	0	46	2
Eibar	2016–17	La Liga	19	0	5	0	—		24	0
Eibar	2017–18	La Liga	4	1	2	0	—		6	1
Eibar	Total		23	1	7	0	0	0	30	1
Las Palmas (loan)	2017–18	La Liga	18	0	1	0	—		19	0
Rayo Vallecano	2018–19	La Liga	17	1	1	0	—		18	1
Qatar SC	2019–20	Qatar Stars League	20	0	0	0	3 (Note: Appearances in Qatar Cup)	0	23	0
Qatar SC	2020–21	Qatar Stars League	15	1	1	0	3	0	19	1
Qatar SC	Total		35	1	1	0	6	0	42	1
Ibiza	2021–22	Segunda División	13	0	0	0	—		13	0
Career total			295	16	23	0	6	0	324	15
