= Saúl (footballer, born 1994) =

Spanish footballer (born 1994)

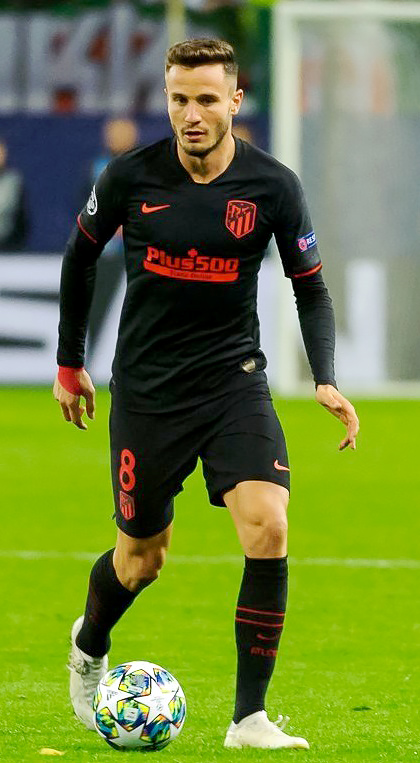
- Saúl playing for Atlético Madrid in 2019

Personal information
- Full name: Saúl Ñíguez Esclápez
- Date of birth: 21 November 1994 (age 32)
- Place of birth: Elche, Spain
- Height: 1.84 m (6 ft 0 in)
- Position: Midfielder

Team information
- Current team: Flamengo
- Number: 8

Youth career
- 2006–2008: Real Madrid
- 2008–2010: Atlético Madrid

Senior career*
Years	Team	Apps	(Gls)
2010–2013	Atlético Madrid B	70	(8)
2012–2025	Atlético Madrid	295	(30)
2013–2014	→ Rayo Vallecano (loan)	34	(2)
2021–2022	→ Chelsea (loan)	10	(0)
2024–2025	→ Sevilla (loan)	24	(1)
2025–	Flamengo	30	(0)

International career^{‡}
2009	Spain U16	4	(1)
2010–2011	Spain U17	9	(2)
2012	Spain U18	3	(0)
2012–2013	Spain U19	11	(0)
2013	Spain U20	8	(0)
2013–2017	Spain U21	25	(9)
2016–2019	Spain	19	(3)
Medal record
Men's football
Representing Spain
UEFA European Under-21 Championship
Runner-up	2017 Poland	Team
UEFA European Under-19 Championship
Winner	2012 Estonia	Team
UEFA European Under-17 Championship
Runner-up	2010 Liechtenstein	Team
- * Club domestic league appearances and goals as of 21 November 2026 ‡ National team caps and goals as of 23:50, 18 November 2019 (UTC)

Saúl Ñíguez Esclápez (born 21 November 1994), often known simply as Saúl, is a Spanish professional footballer who plays as a midfielder for Campeonato Brasileiro Série A club Flamengo. A versatile player, he can also be deployed as a box-to-box midfielder or a left-back.

After coming through Atlético Madrid's youth academy, Saúl went on to appear in more than 400 competitive matches for the club, winning the 2020–21 La Liga, two Europa League titles, while he was also a Champions League runner-up in 2016. He also spent time on loan at fellow La Liga sides Rayo Vallecano and Sevilla, as well as Premier League club Chelsea in 2021–22. In 2025, he left Atlético and joined Brazilian club Flamengo, winning both the Copa Libertadores and Série A in his first season.

Having represented Spain at various youth levels, Saúl helped the under-21 team finish second in the 2017 UEFA European Under-21 Championship, being top scorer in the process. He made his debut for the senior team in 2016 and was part of the team at the 2018 FIFA World Cup.

== Club career ==
=== Atlético Madrid ===
Born in Elche, Valencian Community, Saúl moved to Real Madrid at the age of 11 before switching to cross-city rivals Atlético Madrid in 2008. He made his senior debut in the 2010–11 season, appearing for the reserve team in the Segunda División B. His first goal came on 10 April 2011 in a 3–1 away win against Extremadura, his only of the season in an eventual midtable finish.

In July 2011, Saúl joined the Atlético main squad for pre-season training. On 8 March 2012, at the age of just 17 years and 108 days, he made his debut with the Atlético first team, playing the last six minutes of a 3–1 home win against Beşiktaş in the UEFA Europa League. His second appearance came on 20 September, again as a substitute and in the Europa League, this time against Hapoel Tel Aviv. Three days later, he scored both goals for Atlético B in a 2–1 away derby win over Real Madrid C.

Saúl made his La Liga debut on 21 April 2013, playing two minutes in a 1–0 win away to Sevilla after replacing fellow youth graduate Koke. Again from the bench, he appeared in his second league match with the main squad on 4 May, against Deportivo La Coruña in a 0–0 draw.

On 21 July 2013, Saúl joined Rayo Vallecano on loan for the 2013–14 season. After returning, he featured in both legs of the 2014 Supercopa de España in which Atlético defeated Real Madrid, starting in the first match.

In a Madrid derby on 7 February 2015, Saúl replaced the injured Koke after ten minutes, and scored his team's second goal shortly after through a bicycle kick, in a 4–0 win. From the 2015–16 season onwards, after the departure of Mario Suárez and the injury of Tiago Mendes, Saúl became a nuclear midfield element for the Diego Simeone-led team.

On 25 February 2015 in a UEFA Champions League round of 16 game against Bayer Leverkusen, Saúl suffered kidney trauma and internal bleeding after a clash with Kyriakos Papadopoulos. He was rushed to hospital and remained there for four days, with Atlético club president Enrique Cerezo describing his kidney as "destroyed". He returned a month later, but continued to suffer from the injury – for a period he played with an internal catheter, and for two years afterwards urinated blood after every training session and match. Doctors suggested he rest for months whilst it healed, but Saúl preferred to continue playing. Eventually after continued frustration he requested for the kidney to be removed, but was persuaded against it by assistant coach Germán Burgos. Only in April 2017 did he publicly reveal the extent of his injury in an interview given to Diario AS, admitting to having played for "two seasons" under extremely painful circumstances, and that he had risked his health continuing to play.

On 27 April 2016, Saúl played 85 minutes in the first leg of the semi-finals of the UEFA Champions League against FC Bayern Munich, and also scored the only goal at the Vicente Calderón Stadium with an individual effort. Starting in the final against Real Madrid, he played the entire 120 minutes and successfully converted his attempt in the penalty shoot-out, in a 5–3 loss. The following 18 April, in the same competition but in the quarter-final, he scored through a header to help Atlético to a 1–1 draw away to Leicester City.

On 1 July 2017, Saúl signed a new nine-year contract with Atlético. He made nine appearances in the 2017–18 Europa League, scoring three goals for the eventual champions.

Saúl started his 250th match for the club on 18 August 2019, in a win over Getafe. In the 2020 Supercopa de España Final against Real Madrid, which ended 0–0 after extra time, both he and Thomas Partey missed their shoot-out attempts in a 4–1 defeat.

On 18 February 2020, Saúl scored from close range in the fourth minute of the 2019–20 Champions League's round-of-16 first leg – his tenth goal in the competition– against defending champions Liverpool to ensure a 1–0 home win for the hosts. He also featured in the second leg at Anfield, playing the entire 3–2 extra-time victory.

On 30 June 2020, Saúl scored twice from penalties in a 2–2 draw away to Barcelona, as Atlético managed that number of goals against that opposition in a league match for the first time under Simeone.

==== Loan to Chelsea ====
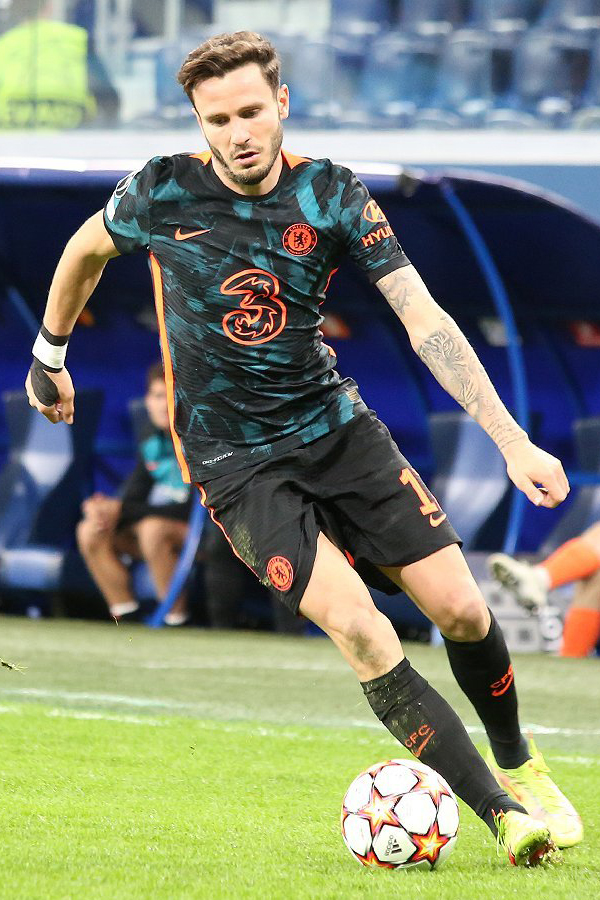
Saúl with Chelsea in 2021

On 31 August 2021, Saúl joined Premier League club Chelsea on loan for the remainder of the 2021–22 season, with an option to make the transfer permanent upon the completion of the loan. He made his Premier League debut on 11 September, in a 3–0 win against Aston Villa, but received criticism from fans for his performance. He won the Club World Cup with Chelsea on 12 February 2022, coming on as a 76th minute substitute to replace Callum Hudson-Odoi in a 2–1 final victory against Palmeiras. He scored his only goal of the season against Luton Town in a 3–2 FA Cup win on 2 March 2022. Saúl posted his goodbye to Chelsea and the club's fans on 7 June 2022 as his loan spell ended and he returned to Atlético Madrid.

==== Return to Atlético Madrid ====
On 24 September 2023, Saúl provided two assists and was named Man of the Match in a 3–1 victory over rivals Real Madrid, which also marked his 300th match in La Liga.

==== Loan to Sevilla ====
On 15 July 2024, Sevilla announced the signing of Saúl on loan for the duration of the 2024–25 season, with the possibility of a further extension.

=== Flamengo ===
On 23 July 2025, Campeonato Brasileiro Série A club Flamengo officially signed Saúl on a free transfer until December 2028 after he terminated his contract with Atlético Madrid. Later that year, he won the Copa Libertadores title after his club's 1–0 victory over Palmeiras in the final, becoming the third Spaniard to achieve this feat following Raúl Amarilla and Pablo Marí.

== International career ==
=== Youth career ===
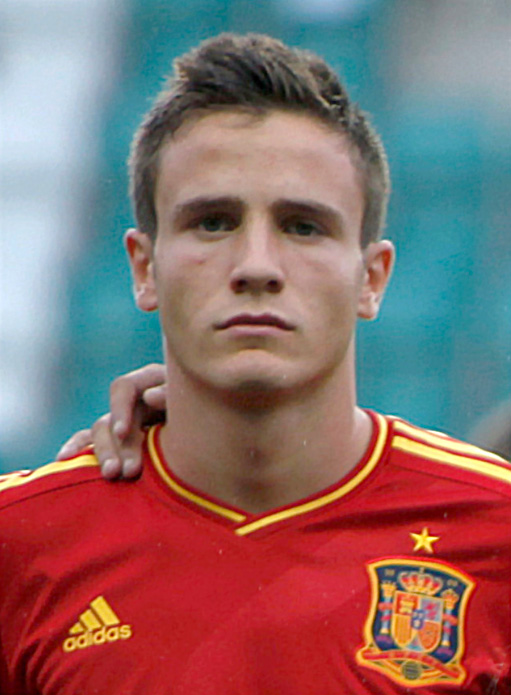
Saúl with Spain U19 in 2012

Saúl earned 47 caps for Spain, all youth levels comprised. He experienced individual and collective success in the under-19 team, winning the 2012 UEFA European Under-19 Championship and being named in the Team of the Tournament.

=== Senior career ===
On 26 May 2015, Saúl was called to the senior team for a friendly with Costa Rica and a UEFA Euro 2016 qualifying match against Belarus, but did not make his debut on either occasion. He, Sergio Rico and Lucas Vázquez were the three uncapped players in a provisional squad for the final tournament in France, but was eventually cut from the final squad alongside Isco.

Saúl made his debut on 1 September 2016, playing 15 minutes in a 2–0 friendly win away to Belgium. He was crowned top scorer at the 2017 UEFA European Under-21 Championship, notably scoring a hat-trick to help Spain beat Italy 3–1 in the semi-final.

Back with the full team, Saúl was selected in the squad chosen by manager Julen Lopetegui for the 2018 FIFA World Cup in Russia. Following Fernando Hierro replacing the latter shortly before the tournament, he was an unused member in an eventual round-of-16 exit.

Under new coach Luis Enrique, Saúl scored his first goal for his country on 8 September 2018, equalising in an eventual 2–1 win against England for the 2018–19 UEFA Nations League A at Wembley Stadium. He also scored against Croatia in the following fixture three days later, a 6–0 victory in his hometown of Elche in the same competition.

== Style of play ==
A midfielder by trade, Saúl was deployed as a centre-back during his spell at Rayo Vallecano. Spanish football journalist Guillem Balagué stated that he suits several styles of play, citing his ability to play "Simeone style" (in reference to Atlético manager Diego Simeone) and "Barcelona style", summing up with "We have never had a midfielder like this".

Following Luis Enrique's appointment as Spain manager in 2018, Diario AS' Alfredo Relaño remarked that "Saúl is the player to move the ball forward with purpose and attempt to finalise long passages of possession", adding that "The new centre of the park for Spain (where so much happens for the national side) is now defined by him, a box-to-box player and one never afraid to try his luck in front of goal", Sid Lowe of The Guardian opined that "now he embodies the shift, technique and talent but athleticism too, blessed of impeccable timing, arriving in the area".

== Personal life ==
Saúl comes from a football family: his father, Boria, played several years with Elche as a striker. His brothers, Aarón and Jony, are also footballers where together they opened a football club based in the Spanish city of Elche named Costa City Club which has a very clear objective: to develop young players aged between 4 and 18 years through sport but also with food education and education.

Saúl was one of the stars of the Amazon Prime television documentary series Six Dreams, recorded during the 2017–18 season. In June 2020, he announced that he and his brother Aarón would be starting a new youth project with Nike called Club Costa City, in his hometown.

== Career statistics ==
=== Club ===
As of match played 21 November 2026

Appearances and goals by club, season and competition
Club	Season	League			National cup (Note: Includes Copa del Rey, FA Cup, Copa do Brasil)		League cup (Note: Includes EFL Cup)		Continental		Other		Total	
Club	Season	Division	Apps	Goals	Apps	Goals	Apps	Goals	Apps	Goals	Apps	Goals	Apps	Goals
Atlético Madrid B	2010–11	Segunda División B	22	1	—		—		—		—		22	1
Atlético Madrid B	2011–12	Segunda División B	22	1	—		—		—		—		22	1
Atlético Madrid B	2012–13	Segunda División B	26	6	—		—		—		—		26	6
Atlético Madrid B	Total		70	8	—		—		—		—		70	8
Atlético Madrid	2011–12	La Liga	0	0	0	0	—		1 (Note: Appearance(s) in UEFA Europa League)	0	—		1	0
Atlético Madrid	2012–13	La Liga	2	0	2	0	—		7	0	0	0	11	0
Atlético Madrid	2014–15	La Liga	24	4	4	0	—		5 (Note: Appearances in UEFA Champions League)	0	2 (Note: Appearance(s) in Supercopa de España)	0	35	4
Atlético Madrid	2015–16	La Liga	31	4	4	2	—		13	3	—		48	9
Atlético Madrid	2016–17	La Liga	33	4	8	1	—		12	4	—		53	9
Atlético Madrid	2017–18	La Liga	36	2	5	0	—		15 (Note: Six appearances and one goal in UEFA Champions League, nine appearances and three goals in UEFA Europa League)	4	—		56	6
Atlético Madrid	2018–19	La Liga	33	4	3	0	—		8	1	1 (Note: Appearance in UEFA Super Cup)	1	45	6
Atlético Madrid	2019–20	La Liga	35	6	1	0	—		9	1	2	0	47	7
Atlético Madrid	2020–21	La Liga	33	2	2	0	—		6	0	—		41	2
Atlético Madrid	2021–22	La Liga	3	0	—		—		—		—		3	0
Atlético Madrid	2022–23	La Liga	31	3	2	0	—		5	0	—		38	3
Atlético Madrid	2023–24	La Liga	34	1	4	0	—		10	1	1	0	49	2
Atlético Madrid	Total		295	30	35	3	—		91	14	6	1	427	48
Rayo Vallecano (loan)	2013–14	La Liga	34	2	3	0	—		—		—		37	2
Chelsea (loan)	2021–22	Premier League	10	0	3	1	4	0	5	0	1 (Note: Appearance in FIFA Club World Cup)	0	23	1
Sevilla (loan)	2024–25	La Liga	24	1	2	0	—		—		—		26	1
Flamengo	2025	Série A	16	0	2	0	—		4 (Note: Appearances in Copa Libertadores)	0	2 (Note: Appearances in FIFA Intercontinental Cup)	0	24	0
Flamengo	2026	Série A	14	0	1	0	—		4	0	0	0	19	0
Flamengo	Total		30	0	3	0	—		8	0	2	0	43	0
Career total			463	41	46	4	4	0	104	14	9	1	626	60

=== International ===
As of match played 18 November 2019

Appearances and goals by national team and year
National team	Year	Apps	Goals
Spain	2016	1	0
Spain	2017	6	0
Spain	2018	8	2
Spain	2019	4	1
Total		19	3

As of match played 18 November 2019
Spain score listed first, score column indicates score after each Saúl goal.

List of international goals scored by Saúl
No.	Date	Venue	Cap	Opponent	Score	Result	Competition	Ref
1	8 September 2018	Wembley Stadium, London, England	11	England	1–1	2–1	2018–19 UEFA Nations League A	
2	11 September 2018	Martínez Valero, Elche, Spain	12	Croatia	1–0	6–0	2018–19 UEFA Nations League A	
3	12 October 2019	Ullevaal Stadion, Oslo, Norway	18	Norway	1–0	1–1	UEFA Euro 2020 qualifying	

== Honours ==
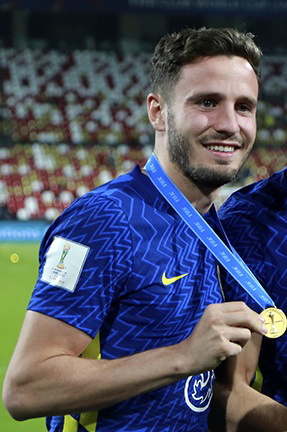
Saúl celebrating the win of the 2021 Club World Cup with Chelsea

Atlético Madrid

- La Liga: 2020–21
- Copa del Rey: 2012–13
- Supercopa de España: 2014
- UEFA Europa League: 2011–12, 2017–18
- UEFA Super Cup: 2018
- UEFA Champions League runner-up: 2015–16

Chelsea

- FIFA Club World Cup: 2021
- EFL Cup runner-up: 2021–22

Flamengo

- FIFA Challenger Cup: 2025
- FIFA Derby of the Americas: 2025
- Copa Libertadores: 2025
- Campeonato Brasileiro Série A: 2025, 2026

Spain U19

- UEFA European Under-19 Championship: 2012

Individual

- UEFA European Under-19 Championship Team of the Tournament: 2012
- UEFA European Under-21 Championship Golden Boot: 2017
- UEFA European Under-21 Championship Team of the Tournament: 2017
- UEFA Europa League Squad of the Season: 2017–18
