= Rubén Ramiro =

Spanish footballer

Personal information
- Full name: Rubén Ramiro Pastor
- Date of birth: 16 April 1993 (age 33)
- Place of birth: Madrid, Spain
- Height: 1.76 m (5 ft 9 1/2 in)
- Position: Striker

Team information
- Current team: E D Moratalaz

Youth career
- 2003–2012: Rayo Vallecano

Senior career*
Years	Team	Apps	(Gls)
2011–2015	Rayo Vallecano B	110	(16)
2012–2014	Rayo Vallecano	2	(0)
2015–2016	Celta B	21	(1)
2016–	Ávila	6	(2)
- * Club domestic league appearances and goals as of 25 September 2016

Rubén Ramiro Pastor (born 16 April 1993) is a Spanish footballer who plays for Real Ávila CF as a striker.

== Club career ==
Born in Madrid, Ramiro joined his hometown club Rayo Vallecano's youth system at the age of ten. He made his first senior appearances with the B-side, in Segunda División B.

On 2 September 2012 Ramiro made his first-team – and La Liga – debut, playing 27 minutes in a 0–0 home draw against Sevilla FC. On 18 July 2015 he moved to another reserve team, Celta de Vigo B also in the third tier.

On 4 July 2016, Ramiro joined Real Ávila in Tercera División.
