= Joaquín Larrivey =

Argentine footballer (born 1984)

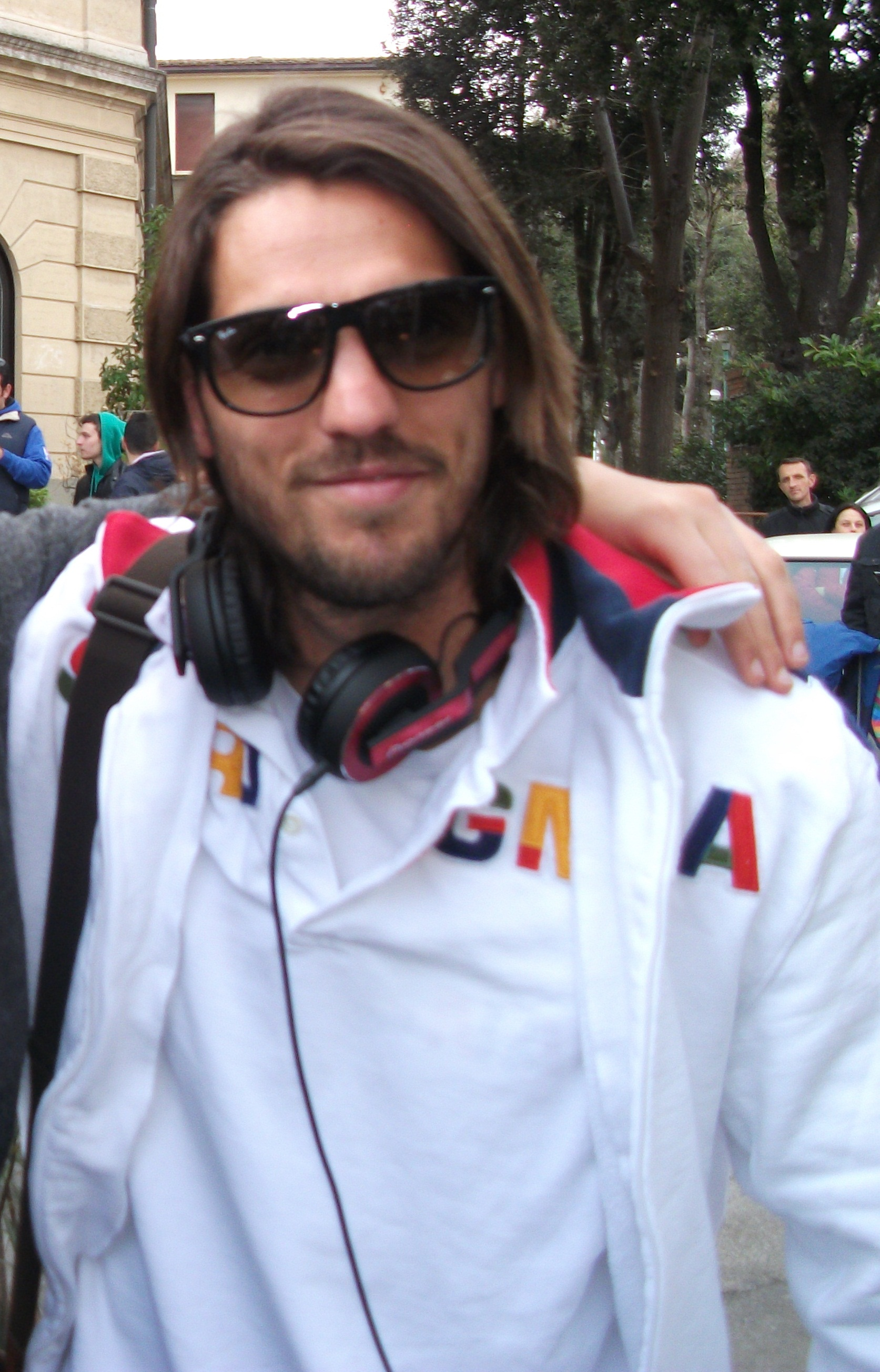
- Larrivey with Cagliari in 2012

Personal information
- Full name: Joaquín Oscar Larrivey
- Date of birth: 20 August 1984 (age 42)
- Place of birth: Gualeguay, Argentina
- Height: 1.86 m (6 ft 1 in)
- Position: Centre forward

Team information
- Current team: Deportes Concepción
- Number: 32

Youth career
- Huracán

Senior career*
| Years | Team | Apps | (Gls) |
| 2004–2007 | Huracán | 94 | (39) |
| 2007–2012 | Cagliari | 96 | (12) |
| 2009 | → Vélez Sársfield (loan) | 16 | (3) |
| 2010–2011 | → Colón (loan) | 20 | (4) |
| 2012–2013 | Atlante | 14 | (2) |
| 2013–2014 | Rayo Vallecano | 35 | (12) |
| 2014–2015 | Celta | 35 | (11) |
| 2015–2016 | Baniyas | 37 | (18) |
| 2017–2018 | JEF United Chiba | 71 | (30) |
| 2019 | Cerro Porteño | 29 | (12) |
| 2020–2021 | Universidad de Chile | 55 | (39) |
| 2022–2023 | Cosenza | 35 | (9) |
| 2023 | Südtirol | 13 | (1) |
| 2023–2024 | Magallanes | 43 | (26) |
| 2025– | Deportes Concepción | 41 | (23) |
- * Club domestic league appearances and goals as of 10 February 2025

Joaquín Oscar Larrivey (Spanish pronunciation: [xoaˈkin lariˈβej]; born 20 August 1984) is an Argentine professional footballer who plays as a centre forward for Chilean club Deportes Concepción.

He is nicknamed el Bati, for his physical resemblance to former footballer Gabriel Batistuta. Larrivey also holds a European Union passport as a second nationality.

== Biography ==
Larrivey was born on 20 August 1984 in Gualeguay, Argentina. He began his career in Argentina with Huracán and quickly became an important player for the side. Larrivey was signed by Italian Serie A side Cagliari in June 2007 on a 4-year contract. On 12 February 2009 Vélez Sársfield of Argentine Primera División signed him on loan until the end of the season. He started successfully at Vélez scoring in his debut game against Tigre. He also scored against Godoy Cruz and Rosario Central. However, after this last one (which was in the 7th game of the Clausura tournament) he was held scoreless. On 1 July 2009, Larrivey returned to Cagliari. On 5 August 2010, he was loaned to Club Atlético Colón.

In 2011, Joaquin Larrivey returned to Cagliari again, this time to take a first team place. After the departure of Alessandro Matri who was sold to Juventus FC and Robert Acquafresca who returned to Genoa after his 1-year loan, Larrivey and Nenê became the first choice strikers. He was assigned the number 9 shirt before the beginning of the season. On 21 August 2011, Larrivey scored a hat-trick in a 5–1 win over U.C. AlbinoLeffe in the Coppa Italia, becoming only the second player to do so in the history of Cagliari, together with legend "Gigi" Riva. On 28 November 2012 Larrivey left Cagliari .

On 17 December 2012 Larrivey was presented as a new player for Mexican club Atlante. He was signed to form the attack with Chilean Esteban Paredes. On 27 January 2013 he scored his first goals with the club recording a brace against Chiapas in a 4–3 victory.

In January 2020, Larrivey moved to Chile and signed with Universidad de Chile.

On 3 February 2022, Larrivey joined Serie B side Cosenza on a deal until the end of the season. On 31 January 2023, Larrivey's contract with Cosenza was terminated by mutual consent.

On 2 February 2023, Larrivey signed with Südtirol, also in Serie B.

In June 2023, Larrivey returned to Chile and joined Magallanes in the Primera B (second level). In 2025, he switched to Deportes Concepción.

== Personal life ==
He is the son-in-law of Gerardo Reinoso, an Argentine former professional football player.

In July 2026, Larrivey got Chilean nationality by residence.

== Honours ==
Vélez Sársfield

- Primera División Argentina: Clausura 2009

Individual

- Liga de Ascenso Best Player: 2025
