= Pape Samba Ba =

Senegalese footballer

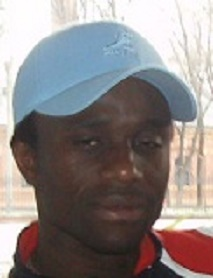
- Pape Samba Ba (2008)

Personal information
- Full name: Pape Samba Ba
- Date of birth: 1 March 1982 (age 44)
- Place of birth: Saint-Louis, Senegal
- Height: 1.88 m (6 ft 2 in)

Senior career*
Years	Team	Apps	(Gls)
- ASC Jeanne d'Arc
2004	Shamkir	8	(2)
2005	Karvan	7	(1)
2005–2006	Lech Poznań	18	(0)
2006–2007	Górnik Polkowice	11	(0)
2008–2009	Odra Opole	25	(2)
2009	Znicz Pruszków	6	(0)
2010	Pogoń Siedlce	13	(0)
2011	KSZO Ostrowiec	13	(0)

International career
	Senegal	7	(0)
- * Club domestic league appearances and goals

Pape Samba Ba (born 1 March 1982 in Saint-Louis) is a Senegalese former professional footballer who played as a midfielder.

== Career ==
Ba has previously played with Polish clubs Lech Poznań and Górnik Polkowice. He played also for some Azerbaijani teams.

In February 2011, Ba signed a one-and-a-half-year contract with KSZO Ostrowiec.

=== International ===
He was a part of the Senegalese national team.
