= 2012–13 Rayo Vallecano season =

Rayo Vallecano
2012–13 season
- President: Raúl Martín Presa
- Head coach: Paco Jémez
- Stadium: Estadio Teresa Rivero
- La Liga: 8th
- Copa del Rey: Round of 32
- Top goalscorer: League: Piti (18); All: Piti (18)
Home colours	Away colours	Third colours

The 2012–13 Rayo Vallecano season was the 79th season in club history.

== Competitions ==
=== Legend ===
Win Draw Loss Postponed

=== La Liga ===
==== League table ====
Pos	Team	Pld	W	D	L	GF	GA	GD	Pts	Qualification or relegation
6	Málaga	38	16	9	13	53	50	+3	57	(Note: Málaga was excluded from participating in any UEFA club competition in 2013–14 season as a punishment for not complying with UEFA Financial Fair Play Regulations. Málaga appealed against this UEFA ban, but the Court of Arbitration for Sport confirmed the decision of the UEFA Club Financial Control Body.)
7	Real Betis	38	16	8	14	57	56	+1	56	Qualification for the Europa League play-off round (Note: Since the 2012–13 Copa del Rey champions Atlético Madrid and runners-up Real Madrid qualified for the 2013–14 UEFA Champions League, the 5th, 6th and 7th placed teams qualified for the group stage, play-off round, and third qualifying round of the 2013–14 UEFA Europa League respectively.)
8	Rayo Vallecano	38	16	5	17	50	66	−16	53	(Note: Rayo Vallecano was excluded from participating in any UEFA club competition for the next season after RFEF denied them a "UEFA licence" because they didn't meet the requirements as they were immersed in a creditor contest. They appealed to CAS in June 2013 and on 11 July that decision was confirmed. The team placed behind them, Sevilla, took their spot at the Europa League third qualifying round.)
9	Sevilla	38	14	8	16	58	54	+4	50	Qualification for the Europa League third qualifying round
10	Getafe	38	13	8	17	43	57	−14	47	

Source: La Liga
Rules for classification: 1st points; 2nd head-to-head points; 3rd head-to-head goal difference; 4th goal difference; 5th number of goals scored; 7th Fair-play points

==== Matches ====
20 August 2012 1	Rayo Vallecano	1 – 0	Granada	Madrid
21:00	Trashorras 90+5'	Summary		Stadium: Campo de Fútbol de Vallecas; Attendance: 9,000; Referee: Antonio Mateu Lahoz (Valencian Community)

25 August 2012 1	Real Betis	1 – 2	Rayo Vallecano	Seville
21:00	Molina 4'	Summary	Piti 2'; Baptistão 62'	Stadium: Estadio Benito Villamarín; Attendance: 29,313; Referee: Miguel Ángel Ayza Gámez (Valencian Community)

2 September 2012 3	Rayo Vallecano	0 – 0	Sevilla	Madrid
12:00		Summary		Stadium: Campo de Fútbol de Vallecas; Attendance: 14,000; Referee: Carlos Clos Gómez (Aragon)

16 September 2012 4	Atlético Madrid	4 – 3	Rayo Vallecano	Madrid
21:30	Suárez 29'; Koke 49'; Turan 51'; Falcao 56' (pen.)	Summary	Delibašić 82', 85'; Baptistão 89'	Stadium: Estadio Vicente Calderón; Attendance: 42,000; Referee: Xavier Estrada Fernández (Catalonia)

24 September 2012 5	Rayo Vallecano	0 – 2	Real Madrid	Madrid
19:45	Domínguez (yellow card) 42'; Casado (yellow card) 60' (yellow-red card) 90+3'; Amat (yellow card) 69'		Essien (yellow card) 5'; Benzema 13'; Arbeloa (yellow card) 19'; Alonso (yellow card) 61'; Ronaldo 70' (pen.)	Stadium: Campo de Fútbol de Vallecas; Attendance: 15,000; Referee: David Fernández Borbalán (Andalusia)
Note: Originally scheduled for 23 September but was postponed due to floodlight failure.

20 December 2012 17	Rayo Vallecano	3 – 0	Levante	Madrid
21:00	Fuego (yellow card) 20'; Domínguez (yellow card) 49'; Nacho 59'; Piti 80'; Vázquez 90+4'	Summary	Martins (yellow card) 29'; Míchel (yellow card) 53'; Iborra (yellow card) 79'; Barkero (yellow card) 84'	Stadium: Campo de Fútbol de Vallecas; Attendance: 11,000; Referee: Antonio Mateu Lahoz (Valencian Community)

=== Copa del Rey ===
Round of 32	v

== Squad ==
=== Minutes played ===
2

=== Starting 11 ===
No. Position Player 2 Spain DF Tito 5 Spain DF Álex Gálvez 6 Spain DF Rodri 8 Spain MF Adrián 9 Spain MF José Carlos 14 Spain DF Anaitz Arbilla No. Position Player 17 Spain MF Roberto Trashorras 19 Guinea FW Lass 25 Spain GK David Cobeño Colombia DF Johan Mojica (on loan from Colombia Llaneros F.C.) Spain MF Raúl Baena Mexico FW Nery Castillo
