= Tito (footballer, born July 1985) =

Spanish footballer

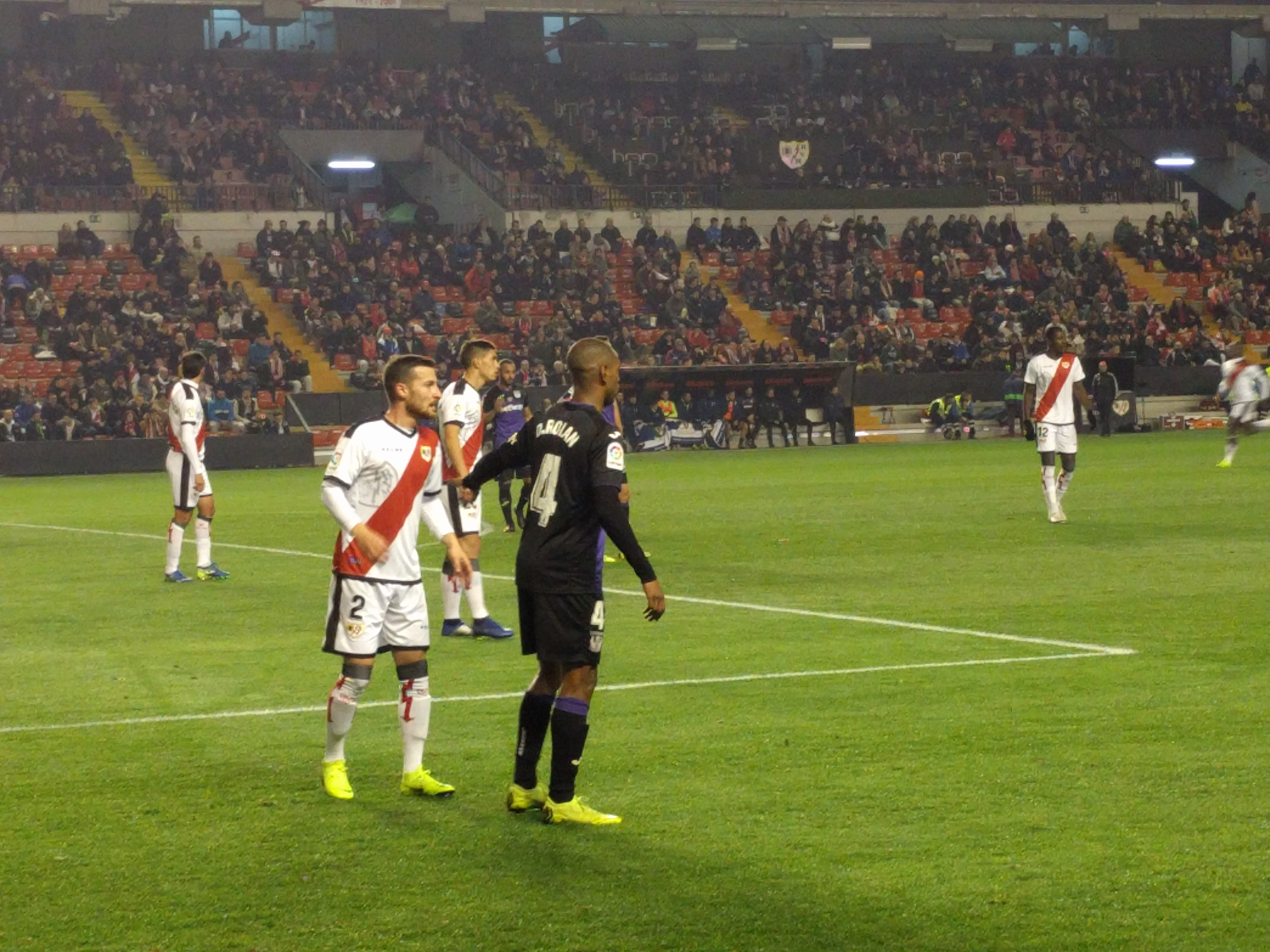
- Tito (left) in action for Rayo Vallecano in 2018

Personal information
- Full name: Roberto Román Triguero
- Date of birth: 11 July 1985 (age 41)
- Place of birth: Madrid, Spain
- Height: 1.74 m (5 ft 9 in)
- Position: Right-back

Youth career
- 2002–2003: Alcalá

Senior career*
Years	Team	Apps	(Gls)
2003–2004	Alcalá	36	(1)
2004–2006	Mallorca B	26	(0)
2006–2009	Alcorcón	69	(1)
2009–2016	Rayo Vallecano	182	(5)
2016–2017	Granada	12	(0)
2017	→ Leganés (loan)	11	(0)
2017–2018	Leganés	9	(0)
2018–2020	Rayo Vallecano	40	(0)
2021–2022	Complutense	46	(4)
2022–2024	Alcalá	53	(5)
Total		484	(16)
- * Club domestic league appearances and goals

Roberto Román Triguero (born 11 July 1985), known as Tito, is a Spanish former professional footballer who played as a right-back.

He appeared in 202 La Liga matches over eight seasons (three goals), with Rayo Vallecano (two spells), Granada and Leganés.

== Club career ==
Born in Madrid, Tito spent his first six years as a senior player in lowly clubs in his native region, also representing RCD Mallorca B in the Segunda División B and Tercera División. In August 2009, due to a clause in his contract which allowed him to leave for free if any Segunda División team required his services, he joined another side from the capital, Rayo Vallecano, for two seasons. He appeared in only ten games in his second year as they returned to La Liga after an eight-year absence, but subsequently became first choice.

Tito scored his first goal in the Spanish top flight on 7 April 2012, his team's last in a 6–0 home win over of CA Osasuna. He started in all of his 36 league appearances during the campaign, totaling 3,161 minutes as they managed to stay afloat.

On 20 December 2015, Tito and teammate Raúl Baena were sent off before the 30 minute mark of an eventual 10–2 away loss against Real Madrid. On 4 July 2016, after Rayo's top-tier relegation, the former signed a two-year deal with Granada CF. He was loaned to fellow top-tier CD Leganés the following 31 January, being bought outright on 6 June.

Tito returned to Rayo Vallecano on 29 July 2018, with the free agent signing a one-year contract. He finished his career aged 39, after two seasons apiece with amateurs AD Complutense and RSD Alcalá.
