= 2014–15 La Liga =

Spanish football league season

La Liga
- Season: 2014–15
- Dates: 23 August 2014 – 23 May 2015
- Champions: Barcelona; 23rd title
- Relegated: Elche; Almería; Córdoba
- Champions League: Barcelona; Real Madrid; Atlético Madrid; Valencia; Sevilla (as Europa League winners)
- Europa League: Villarreal; Athletic Bilbao
- Matches: 380
- Goals: 1,009 (2.66 per match)
- Top goalscorer: Cristiano Ronaldo (48 goals)
- Best goalkeeper: Claudio Bravo (0.51 goals/match)
- Biggest home win: Real Madrid 9–1 Granada (5 April 2015)
- Biggest away win: Córdoba 0–8 Barcelona (2 May 2015)
- Highest scoring: Deportivo La Coruña 2–8 Real Madrid (20 September 2014); Real Madrid 9–1 Granada (5 April 2015); Real Madrid 7–3 Getafe (23 May 2015)
- Longest winning run: 12 matches Real Madrid
- Longest unbeaten run: 14 matches Barcelona
- Longest winless run: 20 matches Córdoba
- Longest losing run: 10 matches Córdoba
- Highest attendance: 98,760; Barcelona 2–1 Real Madrid (22 March 2015)
- Lowest attendance: 3,500; Getafe 2–1 Celta Vigo (26 January 2015)
- Total attendance: 10,161,726
- Average attendance: 26,741

The 2014–15 La Liga season (known as the Liga BBVA for sponsorship reasons) was the 84th season of the premier association football league in Spain. The campaign began on 23 August 2014, and concluded on 24 May 2015.

Barcelona won its 23rd title on 17 May 2015 after defeating defending champions Atlético Madrid at the Vicente Calderón Stadium, and also equalled the all-time record goal difference of +89 (110 goals scored and 21 conceded), originally set by Real Madrid in the 2011–12 season. Barcelona won the title with 94 points, two more than Real Madrid.

== Teams ==
=== Promotion and relegation (pre-season) ===
A total of 20 teams contest the league, including 17 sides from the 2013–14 season and three promoted from the 2013–14 Segunda División. This includes the two top teams (Eibar and Deportivo La Coruña) from the Segunda División, and the winner of the play-offs, Córdoba.

Eibar became the first club from Segunda División to achieve promotion to La Liga after its 1–0 victory over Alavés on 25 May 2014. Eibar made their La Liga debut in the 2014–15 season.

Deportivo La Coruña won promotion back to La Liga after one season in Segunda División with a 1–0 victory over Real Jaén on 31 May 2014.

Córdoba won the promotion play-off against Las Palmas and returned to the top level after 42 years.

=== Stadia and locations ===
Location of teams in 2014–15 La Liga

Team	Location	Stadium	Capacity
Almería	Almería	Juegos Mediterráneos	21,350
Athletic Bilbao	Bilbao	San Mamés	53,289
Atlético Madrid	Madrid	Vicente Calderón	54,907
Barcelona	Barcelona	Camp Nou	99,786
Celta Vigo	Vigo	Balaídos	31,800
Córdoba	Córdoba	El Arcángel	21,822
Deportivo La Coruña	A Coruña	Riazor	34,600
Eibar	Eibar	Ipurua	6,000
Elche	Elche	Martínez Valero	36,017
Espanyol	Barcelona	Power8 Stadium	40,500
Getafe	Getafe	Coliseum Alfonso Pérez	17,393
Granada	Granada	Nuevo Los Cármenes	23,156
Levante	Valencia	Ciutat de València	26,354
Málaga	Málaga	La Rosaleda	30,044
Rayo Vallecano	Madrid	Vallecas	14,708
Real Madrid	Madrid	Santiago Bernabéu	81,044
Real Sociedad	San Sebastián	Anoeta	32,076
Sevilla	Seville	Ramón Sánchez Pizjuán	45,500
Valencia	Valencia	Mestalla	55,000
Villarreal	Villarreal	El Madrigal	25,000

=== Personnel and sponsorship ===
Team	Head coach	Captain	Kit manufacturer	Shirt sponsor
Almería	(Spain) Miguel Rivera	(Spain) Corona	Nike	Urcisol.com, Costa de Almería^{1}, Vita Hoteliers^{3}
Athletic Bilbao	(Spain) Ernesto Valverde	(Spain) Carlos Gurpegui	Nike	Petronor/BBK (only in UEFA matches), BBK^{2}
Atlético Madrid	(Argentina) Diego Simeone	(Spain) Gabi	Nike	Azerbaijan Land of Fire, Plus500^{1}, Huawei^{2}
Barcelona	(Spain) Luis Enrique	(Spain) Xavi	Nike	Qatar Airways, UNICEF^{1} ^{4}, Beko^{2}
Celta Vigo	(Argentina) Eduardo Berizzo	(Spain) Borja Oubiña	Adidas	Citroën, Estrella Galicia 0,0^{1} ^{3}, Abanca^{3}
Córdoba	(Spain) José Antonio Romero	(Spain) Abel Gómez	Acerbis	RD Impagos, Supermercados Piedra^{1}, Diputación de Córdoba^{3}
Deportivo La Coruña	(Spain) Víctor Fernández	(Spain) Manuel Pablo	Lotto	Estrella Galicia 0,0, Abanca^{1}
Eibar	(Spain) Gaizka Garitano	(Spain) Txema Añibarro	Hummel	Hierros Servando, Gipuzkoa^{1}/Wiko^{1} ^{3}, Eibar Innovación Berrikuntza^{2}
Elche	(Spain) Fran Escribá	(Spain) Edu Albácar	Kelme	Gioseppo, Amix^{1}, Modalia^{3}
Espanyol	(Spain) Sergio González	(Spain) Sergio García	Puma	Power8, Riviera Maya^{2} ^{3}
Getafe	(Spain) Pablo Franco	(Spain) Jaime Gavilán	Joma	Tecnocasa Group, UEDBet/UED^{1} ^{3}
Granada	(Spain) José Ramón Sandoval	(Spain) Diego Mainz	Joma	Solver Sports Capital, Banco Mare Nostrum^{1}, Doyen Sports^{1} ^{3}, Coviran^{1}, Caja Rural Granada^{2}, Herogra^{3}, Tejidos Malagón^{3}
Levante	(Spain) Lucas Alcaraz	(Spain) Juanfran	Nike	East United, Diputació de València^{1}
Málaga	(Spain) Javi Gracia	(Portugal) Duda	Nike	UNESCO^{5}, Benahavis^{1}
Rayo Vallecano	(Spain) Paco Jémez	(Spain) Roberto Trashorras	Erreà	Qbao.com, Nevir^{1}, Halcon Viajes^{3}
Real Madrid	(Italy) Carlo Ancelotti	(Spain) Iker Casillas	Adidas	Fly Emirates
Real Sociedad	(Scotland) David Moyes	(Spain) Xabi Prieto	Adidas	Qbao.com, Kutxa^{1}, Canal+^{2}
Sevilla	(Spain) Unai Emery	(Spain) Fernando Navarro	Warrior	Visit Malaysia
Valencia	(Portugal) Nuno Espírito Santo	(Spain) Dani Parejo	Adidas	Gol Televisión^{1}
Villarreal	(Spain) Marcelino	(Spain) Bruno	Xtep	Pamesa Cerámica, Endavant

1. On the back of shirt.
2. On the sleeves.
3. On the shorts.
4. Barcelona makes a donation to UNICEF to display the charity's logo on the club's kit.
5. Málaga makes a donation to UNESCO in order to display the charity's logo on the club's kit.
6. Referee kits are now being made by Adidas, sponsored by Würth, and Nike has a new match ball, the Ordem LFP.
7. Additionally, 14 teams showed the logo of Sockatyes in their socks since matchday 8 as a result of a sponsorship agreement with the LFP (all except Athletic Bilbao, FC Barcelona, Real Madrid, Real Sociedad, Sevilla and Valencia). Also, in these agreement those teams showed the logo of PES2015 during the last 7 matchdays.

=== Managerial changes ===
Team	Outgoing manager	Manner of departure	Date of vacancy	Position in table	Replaced by	Date of appointment
Celta Vigo	(Spain) Luis Enrique	Resigned	15 May 2014	Pre-season	(Argentina) Eduardo Berizzo	2 June 2014
Málaga	(Germany) Bernd Schuster	End of contract	16 May 2014	Pre-season	(Spain) Javi Gracia	30 May 2014
Espanyol	(Mexico) Javier Aguirre	End of contract	16 May 2014	Pre-season	(Spain) Sergio González Soriano	28 May 2014
Barcelona	(Argentina) Gerardo Martino	Resigned	17 May 2014	Pre-season	(Spain) Luis Enrique	19 May 2014
Granada	(Spain) Lucas Alcaraz	End of contract	28 May 2014	Pre-season	(Spain) Joaquín Caparrós	28 May 2014
Levante	(Spain) Joaquín Caparrós	Signed by Granada	28 May 2014	Pre-season	(Spain) José Luis Mendilibar	30 May 2014
Valencia	(Argentina) Juan Antonio Pizzi	Sacked	2 July 2014	Pre-season	(Portugal) Nuno Espírito Santo	4 July 2014
Deportivo La Coruña	(Spain) Fernando Vázquez	Sacked	8 July 2014	Pre-season	(Spain) Víctor Fernández	10 July 2014
Córdoba	(Spain) Albert Ferrer	Sacked	20 October 2014	20th	(Serbia) Miroslav Đukić	20 October 2014
Levante	(Spain) José Luis Mendilibar	Sacked	20 October 2014	19th	(Spain) Lucas Alcaraz	21 October 2014
Real Sociedad	(Spain) Jagoba Arrasate	Sacked	2 November 2014	19th	(Scotland) David Moyes	10 November 2014
Almería	(Spain) Francisco	Sacked	9 December 2014	17th	(Spain) Juan Ignacio Martínez	12 December 2014
Getafe	(Romania) Cosmin Contra	Signed by Guangzhou R&F	18 December 2014	13th	(Spain) Quique Sánchez Flores	5 January 2015
Granada	(Spain) Joaquín Caparrós	Sacked	13 January 2015	20th	(Spain) Abel Resino	19 January 2015
Getafe	(Spain) Quique Sánchez Flores	Resigned	26 February 2015	13th	(Spain) Pablo Franco	11 March 2015
Córdoba	(Serbia) Miroslav Đukić	Sacked	16 March 2015	20th	(Spain) José Antonio Romero	16 March 2015
Almería	(Spain) Juan Ignacio Martínez	Sacked	5 April 2015	18th	(Spain) Sergi Barjuán	6 April 2015
Deportivo La Coruña	(Spain) Víctor Fernández	Sacked	8 April 2015	17th	(Spain) Víctor Sánchez	8 April 2015
Granada	(Spain) Abel Resino	Sacked	1 May 2015	19th	(Spain) José Ramón Sandoval	1 May 2015

== Overview ==
On 2 May, Córdoba were relegated with three games left to play in the season, after losing 0–8 at home against Barcelona. Eight days later, Villarreal confirmed sixth place and an entry into the UEFA Europa League with Joel Campbell's winning goal against Elche.

Barcelona, playing with a three-man attack of Lionel Messi, Neymar and Luis Suárez under new manager Luis Enrique, won the title on 17 May with a goal by Messi to defeat holders Atlético Madrid at the Vicente Calderón Stadium. It came exactly a year after Atlético had won their league title at Barcelona's Camp Nou. Real Madrid secured second place on the same day as Barcelona won the title, with a 1–4 win at Espanyol. In the end, Barcelona amassed 94 points, while Real Madrid finished just two points behind, with 92.

The battle for the Champions League was settled in the last ten minutes of the season. Valencia, in fourth place with 74 points, went into the last match of the season at relegation-threatened Almería, facing all three possibilities of direct qualification to the group stage of the Champions League, qualification to the play-off round, or missing out on the Champions League altogether. Valencia won the match 3–2 to secure fourth place, as Atlético Madrid, three points ahead, drew at Granada. Sevilla, with a 3–2 win at Málaga, achieved a record 76 points total without Champions League qualification, finishing fifth. Sevilla however qualified for the Champions League by winning the 2015 UEFA Europa League Final.

Earlier in the season, on 7 February, Atlético Madrid achieved a 4–0 victory over city rivals Real Madrid. It was Real's biggest loss since a 5–0 loss to Barcelona in November 2010.

Despite finishing the season in the 13th position, on 5 June, Elche was relegated to Segunda División due to its financial struggles. Newcomers Eibar, who finished the season in the 18th position, took Elche's place in 2015–16 La Liga.

== League table ==
Pos	Team	Pld	W	D	L	GF	GA	GD	Pts	Qualification or relegation
1	Barcelona (C)	38	30	4	4	110	21	+89	94	Qualification for the Champions League group stage
2	Real Madrid	38	30	2	6	118	38	+80	92	Qualification for the Champions League group stage
3	Atlético Madrid	38	23	9	6	67	29	+38	78	Qualification for the Champions League group stage
4	Valencia	38	22	11	5	70	32	+38	77	Qualification for the Champions League play-off round
5	Sevilla	38	23	7	8	71	45	+26	76	Qualification for the Champions League group stage (Note: Sevilla qualified for the Champions League group stage by winning the 2014–15 UEFA Europa League. As a result, the fifth-placed spot for the Europa League group stage they earned was vacated without replacement as per UEFA regulations.)
6	Villarreal	38	16	12	10	48	37	+11	60	Qualification for the Europa League group stage (Note: Since the winners of the 2014–15 Copa del Rey, Barcelona, qualified for European competition based on league position, the spot awarded to the cup winners (Europa League group stage) was passed to the sixth-placed team, and the spot awarded to the sixth-placed team (Europa League third qualifying round) was passed to the seventh-placed team.)
7	Athletic Bilbao	38	15	10	13	42	41	+1	55	Qualification for the Europa League third qualifying round
8	Celta Vigo	38	13	12	13	47	44	+3	51	
9	Málaga	38	14	8	16	42	48	−6	50	
10	Espanyol	38	13	10	15	47	51	−4	49 (Note: Espanyol ahead on head-to-head record; Rayo Vallecano–Espanyol 1–3, Espanyol–Rayo Vallecano 1–1.)	
11	Rayo Vallecano	38	15	4	19	46	68	−22	49	
12	Real Sociedad	38	11	13	14	44	51	−7	46	
13	Elche (Note: Elche administratively relegated by the LFP.) (R)	38	11	8	19	35	62	−27	41	Relegation to Segunda División
14	Levante	38	9	10	19	34	67	−33	37 (Note: Levante ahead on head-to-head record; Levante–Getafe 1–1, Getafe–Levante 0–1.)	
15	Getafe	38	10	7	21	33	64	−31	37	
16	Deportivo La Coruña	38	7	14	17	35	60	−25	35 (Note: Head-to-head record: Deportivo 7 pts, Granada 6 pts, Eibar 2 pts)	
17	Granada	38	7	14	17	29	64	−35	35	
18	Eibar	38	9	8	21	34	55	−21	35	
19	Almería (Note: Almería was docked 3 points due to an unpayment of a transfer.) (R)	38	8	8	22	35	64	−29	29	Relegation to Segunda División
20	Córdoba (R)	38	3	11	24	22	68	−46	20	Relegation to Segunda División

Source: La Liga
Rules for classification: 1) points; 2) head-to-head points; 3) head-to-head goal difference; 4) goal difference; 5) number of goals scored; 6) fair-play points; 7) playoff match
(C) Champions; (R) Relegated

== Results ==
Home \ Away	ALM	ATH	ATM	FCB	CEL	CÓR	RCD	EIB	ELC	ESP	GET	GCF	LEV	MCF	RVA	RMA	RSO	SFC	VCF	VIL
Almería		0–1	0–1	1–2	2–2	1–1	0–0	2–0	2–2	1–1	1–0	3–0	1–4	1–2	0–1	1–4	2–2	0–2	2–3	0–0
Athletic Bilbao	2–1		1–4	2–5	1–1	0–1	1–1	0–0	1–2	3–1	4–0	0–1	3–0	1–1	1–0	1–0	1–1	1–0	1–1	4–0
Atlético Madrid	3–0	0–0		0–1	2–2	4–2	2–0	2–1	3–0	2–0	2–0	2–0	3–1	3–1	3–1	4–0	2–0	4–0	1–1	0–1
Barcelona	4–0	2–0	3–1		0–1	5–0	2–2	3–0	3–0	5–1	6–0	6–0	5–0	0–1	6–1	2–1	2–0	5–1	2–0	3–2
Celta Vigo	0–1	1–2	2–0	0–1		1–0	2–1	0–1	1–1	3–2	3–1	0–0	3–0	1–0	6–1	2–4	2–2	1–1	1–1	1–3
Córdoba	1–2	0–1	0–2	0–8	1–1		0–0	1–1	0–2	0–0	1–2	2–0	0–0	1–2	1–2	1–2	1–1	1–3	1–2	0–2
Deportivo La Coruña	0–1	1–0	1–2	0–4	0–2	1–1		2–0	1–0	0–0	1–2	2–2	2–0	0–1	2–2	2–8	0–0	3–4	3–0	1–1
Eibar	5–2	0–1	1–3	0–2	0–1	3–0	0–1		0–1	0–2	2–1	1–1	3–3	1–0	1–2	0–4	1–0	1–3	0–1	1–1
Elche	1–0	2–3	0–2	0–6	0–1	2–2	4–0	0–2		2–1	0–1	1–1	1–0	1–2	2–0	0–2	1–0	0–2	0–4	2–2
Espanyol	3–0	1–0	0–0	0–2	1–0	1–0	0–0	1–2	1–1		2–0	2–1	2–1	2–2	1–1	1–4	2–0	1–2	1–2	1–1
Getafe	1–0	1–2	0–1	0–0	2–1	1–1	2–1	1–1	0–0	2–1		1–2	0–1	1–0	1–2	0–3	0–1	2–1	0–3	1–1
Granada	0–0	0–0	0–0	1–3	1–1	2–0	2–1	0–0	1–0	1–2	1–1		0–1	1–0	0–1	0–4	1–1	1–1	1–1	0–0
Levante	2–1	0–2	2–2	0–5	0–1	1–0	0–0	2–1	0–0	2–2	1–1	2–1		4–1	0–2	0–5	1–1	1–2	2–1	0–2
Málaga	1–2	1–0	2–2	0–0	1–0	2–0	1–1	2–1	1–2	0–2	3–2	2–1	0–0		4–0	1–2	1–1	2–3	1–0	1–1
Rayo Vallecano	2–0	2–1	0–0	0–2	1–0	0–1	1–2	2–3	2–3	1–3	2–0	3–1	4–2	1–0		0–2	2–4	0–1	1–1	2–0
Real Madrid	3–0	5–0	1–2	3–1	3–0	2–0	2–0	3–0	5–1	3–0	7–3	9–1	2–0	3–1	5–1		4–1	2–1	2–2	1–1
Real Sociedad	1–2	1–1	2–1	1–0	1–1	3–1	2–2	1–0	3–0	1–0	1–2	0–3	3–0	0–1	0–1	4–2		4–3	1–1	0–0
Sevilla	2–1	2–0	0–0	2–2	1–0	3–0	4–1	0–0	3–0	3–2	2–0	5–1	1–1	2–0	2–0	2–3	1–0		1–1	2–1
Valencia	3–2	0–0	3–1	0–1	1–1	3–0	2–0	3–1	3–1	3–1	1–0	4–0	3–0	3–0	3–0	2–1	2–0	3–1		0–0
Villarreal	2–0	2–0	0–1	0–1	4–1	0–0	3–0	1–0	1–0	0–3	2–1	2–0	1–0	2–1	4–2	0–2	4–0	0–2	1–3	

Source: La Liga
Legend: Blue = home team win; Yellow = draw; Red = away team win.

== Season statistics ==
=== Scoring ===
- First goal of the season:
  (Spain) Luis Alberto for Málaga against Athletic Bilbao (23 August 2014)
- Last goal of the season:
  (Brazil) Marcelo for Real Madrid against Getafe (23 May 2015)

=== Top goalscorers ===
The Pichichi Trophy is awarded by newspaper Marca to the player who scores the most goals in a season.

Rank	Player	Club	Goals
1	(Portugal) Cristiano Ronaldo	Real Madrid	48
2	(Argentina) Lionel Messi	Barcelona	43
3	(France) Antoine Griezmann	Atlético Madrid	22
3	(Brazil) Neymar	Barcelona	22
5	(Colombia) Carlos Bacca	Sevilla	20
6	(Spain) Aritz Aduriz	Athletic Bilbao	18
7	(Spain) Alberto Bueno	Rayo Vallecano	17
8	(Uruguay) Luis Suárez	Barcelona	16
9	(France) Karim Benzema	Real Madrid	15
10	(Spain) Sergio García	Espanyol	14
10	(Brazil) Jonathas	Elche	14

=== Top assists ===
Rank	Player	Club	Assists
1	(Argentina) Lionel Messi	Barcelona	18
2	(Portugal) Cristiano Ronaldo	Real Madrid	16
3	(Uruguay) Luis Suárez	Barcelona	14
4	(Spain) Nolito	Celta Vigo	13
4	(Colombia) James Rodríguez	Real Madrid	13
6	(France) Karim Benzema	Real Madrid	10
6	(Spain) Koke	Atlético Madrid	10
8	(Wales) Gareth Bale	Real Madrid	9
8	(Russia) Denis Cheryshev	Villarreal	9
8	(Spain) Sergio García	Espanyol	9
8	(Spain) Isco	Real Madrid	9

=== Hat-tricks ===
Player	For	Against	Result	Date	Reference
(Portugal) Cristiano Ronaldo	Real Madrid	Deportivo La Coruña	8–2 (A)	20 September 2014	Report
(Portugal) Cristiano Ronaldo^{4}	Real Madrid	Elche	5–1 (H)	23 September 2014	Report
(Brazil) Neymar	Barcelona	Granada	6–0 (H)	27 September 2014	Report
(Portugal) Cristiano Ronaldo	Real Madrid	Athletic Bilbao	5–0 (H)	5 October 2014	Report
(Argentina) Lionel Messi	Barcelona	Sevilla	5–1 (H)	22 November 2014	Report
(Mexico) Carlos Vela	Real Sociedad	Elche	3–0 (H)	28 November 2014	Report
(Portugal) Cristiano Ronaldo	Real Madrid	Celta Vigo	3–0 (H)	6 December 2014	Report
(Argentina) Lionel Messi	Barcelona	Espanyol	5–1 (H)	7 December 2014	Report
(France) Antoine Griezmann	Atlético Madrid	Athletic Bilbao	4–1 (A)	21 December 2014	Report
(Argentina) Lionel Messi	Barcelona	Deportivo La Coruña	4–0 (A)	18 January 2015	Report
(Spain) David Barral	Levante	Málaga	4–1 (H)	7 February 2015	Report
(Argentina) Lionel Messi	Barcelona	Levante	5–0 (H)	15 February 2015	Report
(Spain) Alberto Bueno^{4}	Rayo Vallecano	Levante	4–2 (H)	28 February 2015	Report
(Argentina) Lionel Messi	Barcelona	Rayo Vallecano	6–1 (H)	8 March 2015	Report
(Spain) David Barral	Levante	Almería	4–1 (A)	4 April 2015	Report
(Portugal) Cristiano Ronaldo^{5}	Real Madrid	Granada	9–1 (H)	5 April 2015	Report
(Spain) Santi Mina^{4}	Celta Vigo	Rayo Vallecano	6–1 (H)	11 April 2015	Report
(Uruguay) Luis Suárez	Barcelona	Córdoba	8–0 (A)	2 May 2015	Report
(Portugal) Cristiano Ronaldo	Real Madrid	Sevilla	3–2 (A)	2 May 2015	Report
(Portugal) Cristiano Ronaldo	Real Madrid	Espanyol	4–1 (A)	17 May 2015	Report
(Portugal) Cristiano Ronaldo	Real Madrid	Getafe	7–3 (H)	23 May 2015	Report

^{4} Player scored four goals
^{5} Player scored five goals
(H) – Home; (A) – Away

=== Discipline ===
- Most yellow cards (club): 115
  - Almería
- Most yellow cards (player): 15
  - Víctor Sánchez (Espanyol)
- Most red cards (club): 9
  - Almería
- Most red cards (player): 2
  - Marcos Angeleri (Málaga)
  - Sebastián Dubarbier (Almería)
  - Michel (Almería)
  - Raúl Navas (Eibar)
  - Federico Piovaccari (Eibar)

== Attendance ==
Pos	Team	Total	High	Low	Average	Change
1	Barcelona	1,475,013	98,760	60,005	77,632	+7.9%
2	Real Madrid	1,395,280	85,450	63,634	73,436	+2.9%
3	Atlético Madrid	884,106	54,069	37,000	46,532	+0.3%
4	Valencia	832,798	51,200	36,763	43,831	+24.7%
5	Athletic Bilbao	772,054	48,437	28,000	40,634	+20.9%
6	Sevilla	591,030	40,355	19,925	31,107	+1.4%
7	Málaga	422,714	29,025	16,181	22,248	−0.9%
8	Real Sociedad	419,996	28,748	14,836	22,105	−5.0%
9	Elche	411,691	31,512	14,162	21,668	−13.5%
10	Deportivo La Coruña	404,223	30,334	14,167	21,275	−4.0%^{1}
11	Celta de Vigo	363,629	25,274	14,386	19,138	−9.1%
12	Espanyol	355,128	30,253	12,710	18,691	−4.8%
13	Granada	313,151	20,848	14,338	16,482	+7.3%
14	Villarreal	303,336	23,000	9,788	15,965	−1.9%
15	Córdoba	296,721	21,495	7,619	15,617	+39.2%^{1}
16	Levante	290,022	23,506	10,558	15,264	−0.2%
17	Rayo Vallecano	201,988	14,070	7,776	10,631	+4.6%
18	Almería	198,238	13,950	8,575	10,434	+2.1%
19	Getafe	139,854	10,591	4,570	7,361	+7.9%
20	Eibar	90,754	6,065	4,008	4,777	+58.1%^{1}
	League total	10,161,726	98,760	4,008	26,741	+1.5%

Updated to games played on 23 May 2015
Notes:
1: Team played last season in Segunda División

== Awards ==
=== Seasonal ===
La Liga's governing body, the Liga Nacional de Fútbol Profesional, honoured the competition's best players and coach with the La Liga Awards.

Award	Recipient
Best Player	(Argentina) Lionel Messi (Barcelona)
Best Coach	(Spain) Luis Enrique (Barcelona)
Best Goalkeeper	(Chile) Claudio Bravo (Barcelona)
Best Defender	(Spain) Sergio Ramos (Real Madrid)
Best Midfielder	(Colombia) James Rodríguez (Real Madrid)
Best Forward	(Argentina) Lionel Messi (Barcelona)

=== Team of the Year ===

Team of the Year
Goalkeeper	(Chile) Claudio Bravo (Barcelona)			
Defence	(Brazil) Dani Alves (Barcelona)	(Spain) Gerard Piqué (Barcelona)	(Argentina) Nicolás Otamendi (Valencia)	(Spain) Jordi Alba (Barcelona)
Midfield	(Poland) Grzegorz Krychowiak (Sevilla)		(Colombia) James Rodríguez (Real Madrid)	(Croatia) Ivan Rakitić (Barcelona)
Attack	(Argentina) Lionel Messi (Barcelona)		(France) Antoine Griezmann (Atlético Madrid)	(Portugal) Cristiano Ronaldo (Real Madrid)

=== Monthly ===
Month	Manager of the Month		Player of the Month		Reference
Month	Manager	Club	Player	Club	Reference
September	(Portugal) Nuno Espírito Santo	Valencia	(Spain) Nolito	Celta Vigo	
October	(Italy) Carlo Ancelotti	Real Madrid	(France) Karim Benzema	Real Madrid	
November	(Spain) Ernesto Valverde	Athletic Bilbao	(Mexico) Carlos Vela	Real Sociedad	
December	(Portugal) Nuno Espírito Santo	Valencia	(Argentina) Luciano Vietto	Villarreal	
January	(Spain) Unai Emery	Sevilla	(France) Antoine Griezmann	Atlético Madrid	
February	(Portugal) Nuno Espírito Santo	Valencia	(Spain) Alberto Bueno	Rayo Vallecano	
March	(Spain) Ernesto Valverde	Athletic Bilbao	(Spain) Vitolo	Sevilla	
April	(Italy) Carlo Ancelotti	Real Madrid	(France) Antoine Griezmann	Atlético Madrid	
May	(Spain) José Ramón Sandoval	Granada	(Portugal) Cristiano Ronaldo	Real Madrid	
