= 2015–16 La Liga =

Spanish football league season

La Liga
- Season: 2015–16
- Dates: 21 August 2015 – 15 May 2016
- Champions: Barcelona; 24th title
- Relegated: Rayo Vallecano; Getafe; Levante
- Champions League: Barcelona; Real Madrid; Atlético Madrid; Villarreal; Sevilla (as Europa League winners)
- Europa League: Athletic Bilbao; Celta Vigo
- Matches: 380
- Goals: 1,043 (2.74 per match)
- Top goalscorer: Luis Suárez (40 goals)
- Best goalkeeper: Jan Oblak (0.47 goals per match)
- Biggest home win: Real Madrid 10–2 Rayo Vallecano (20 December 2015)
- Biggest away win: Deportivo La Coruña 0–8 Barcelona (20 April 2016)
- Highest scoring: Real Madrid 10–2 Rayo Vallecano (20 December 2015)
- Longest winning run: 12 matches Barcelona; Real Madrid
- Longest unbeaten run: 23 matches Barcelona
- Longest winless run: 13 matches Deportivo La Coruña; Getafe
- Longest losing run: 7 matches Getafe
- Highest attendance: 98,902; Barcelona 1–2 Real Madrid (2 April 2016)
- Lowest attendance: 4,215; Eibar 5–1 Granada (18 January 2016)
- Total attendance: 10,554,764
- Average attendance: 27,775

The 2015–16 La Liga season (known as the Liga BBVA for sponsorship reasons) was the 85th since its establishment. Barcelona were the defending champions. The season began on 21 August 2015, and concluded on 15 May 2016.

Barcelona successfully retained the title (their 24th Liga overall) following a 3–0 win against Granada on the final matchday. Barcelona, Real Madrid and Atlético Madrid were engaged in an intense title race, with the three teams finishing with 91, 90 and 88 points respectively.

Barcelona's Luis Suárez finished as the league's top scorer, becoming the first player apart from Lionel Messi or Cristiano Ronaldo to do so since the 2008–09 season.

== Teams ==
=== Promotion and relegation (pre-season) ===
A total of twenty teams contested the league, including seventeen sides from the 2014–15 season and three promoted from the 2014–15 Segunda División. This included the two top teams from the Segunda División, Real Betis and Sporting Gijón, and the winners of the play-offs, Las Palmas.

Almería and Córdoba were relegated to 2015–16 Segunda División in the previous season, after spending two and one years in La Liga, respectively. Elche was administratively relegated despite finishing in 13th. Following the competition rules, Eibar, who finished 18th, remained in the league.

Real Betis was the first team from the Segunda División to achieve promotion, after a one-year absence from La Liga, on 24 May 2015 after winning 3–0 over Alcorcón.

On 7 June 2015, Sporting Gijón secured promotion on the final matchday, after their 3–0 win against Betis allowed the club to leapfrog Girona, who drew their final match and could not retain second place and automatic promotion. Sporting returned to the top level after three years.

Las Palmas achieved promotion on 21 June 2015, after defeating Zaragoza in the promotion play-off final on away goals. Las Palmas won the second 2–0 leg at home after losing the first leg away 3–1, and returned to the first division after thirteen years away. They also became the first island team to play in La Liga since Mallorca's relegation from the top flight in the 2012–13 season. During those thirteen seasons, the club spent two of them in the third-tier Segunda División B.

=== Stadiums and locations ===
Location of teams in 2015–16 La Liga
Location of teams in 2015–16 La Liga (Canary Islands)

Team	Location	Stadium	Capacity
Athletic Bilbao	Bilbao	San Mamés	53,289
Atlético Madrid	Madrid	Vicente Calderón	54,907
Barcelona	Barcelona	Camp Nou	99,354
Celta Vigo	Vigo	Balaídos	30,000
Deportivo La Coruña	A Coruña	Riazor	34,600
Eibar	Eibar	Ipurua	6,267
Espanyol	Barcelona	RCDE Stadium	40,500
Getafe	Getafe	Coliseum Alfonso Pérez	17,393
Granada	Granada	Nuevo Los Cármenes	23,156
Las Palmas	Las Palmas	Gran Canaria	32,150
Levante	Valencia	Ciutat de València	26,354
Málaga	Málaga	La Rosaleda	30,044
Rayo Vallecano	Madrid	Vallecas	14,708
Real Betis	Seville	Benito Villamarín	52,500
Real Madrid	Madrid	Santiago Bernabéu	85,454
Real Sociedad	San Sebastián	Anoeta	32,076
Sevilla	Seville	Ramón Sánchez Pizjuán	42,500
Sporting Gijón	Gijón	El Molinón	29,029
Valencia	Valencia	Mestalla	55,000
Villarreal	Villarreal	El Madrigal	24,890

=== Personnel and sponsorship ===
Team	Head coach	Captain	Kit	Shirt sponsor
Athletic Bilbao	(Spain) Ernesto Valverde	(Spain) Carlos Gurpegui	Nike	Kutkabank
Atlético Madrid	(Argentina) Diego Simeone	(Spain) Gabi	Nike	Plus500, Azerbaijan Land of Fire^{1}, Huawei^{2}
Barcelona	(Spain) Luis Enrique	(Spain) Andrés Iniesta	Nike	Qatar Airways, Beko^{2}, UNICEF^{4}
Celta Vigo	(Argentina) Eduardo Berizzo	(Spain) Hugo Mallo	Adidas	Citroën, Estrella Galicia 0,0^{1} ^{3}, Abanca^{3}
Deportivo La Coruña	(Spain) Víctor Sánchez	(Spain) Manuel Pablo	Lotto	Estrella Galicia 0,0, Abanca^{1}, 西甲欢乐多^{5}
Eibar	(Spain) José Luis Mendilibar	(Spain) Daniel García	Puma	AVIA, Wiko^{1} ^{3}, Eibar Energia Hiria^{2}
Espanyol	(Romania) Constantin Gâlcă	(Spain) Javi López	Joma	Power8/Rastar, Riviera Maya^{2} ^{3}
Getafe	(Argentina) Juan Esnáider	(Spain) Pedro León	Joma	Tecnocasa Group, Gedesco^{1}
Granada	(Spain) José González	(Spain) Diego Mainz	Joma	Solver Sports Capital, Banco Mare Nostrum^{1}, Coviran^{1}, Caja Rural Granada^{2}
Las Palmas	(Spain) Quique Setién	(Spain) David García	Acerbis	Gran Canaria, Grupo DISA^{1}, Islas Canarias^{1}/Air Europa^{1}, CajaSur^{2}, BeCordial Hotels & Resorts^{3}, Binter^{3}/Domingo Alonso^{3}, Volkswagen^{3}
Levante	(Spain) Rubi	(Spain) Juanfran	Nike	East United/BetEast, Baleària^{1}, Valencia^{1}, BetEast^{2}
Málaga	(Spain) Javi Gracia	(Portugal) Duda	Nike	Benahavis^{1}
Rayo Vallecano	(Spain) Paco Jémez	(Spain) David Cobeño	Kelme	Qbao.com, Halcón Viajes^{3}
Real Betis	(Uruguay) Gus Poyet	(Spain) Jorge Molina	Adidas	UED Sports, Wiko^{1} ^{3}
Real Madrid	(France) Zinedine Zidane	(Spain) Sergio Ramos	Adidas	Fly Emirates
Real Sociedad	(Spain) Eusebio Sacristán	(Spain) Xabi Prieto	Adidas	Qbao.com, Kutxabank^{1}, Canal+^{2}
Sevilla	(Spain) Unai Emery	(Spain) José Antonio Reyes	New Balance	Reale Seguros^{6}, Andalucía^{1} ^{6}, ZTE^{3} ^{6}
Sporting Gijón	(Spain) Abelardo Fernández	(Spain) Alberto Lora	Kappa	Gijón, Ternera Asturiana^{2}, Telecable^{3}, Nissan^{3}
Valencia	(Spain) Pako Ayestarán	(Spain) Paco Alcácer	Adidas	Codere (only in UEFA matches), Gol Televisión/beIN Sports^{1}, Codere^{2}
Villarreal	(Spain) Marcelino	(Spain) Bruno Soriano	Xtep	Pamesa Cerámica, Endavant

1. On the back of shirt.
2. On the sleeves.
3. On the shorts.
4. Barcelona made a donation to UNICEF in order to display the charity's logo on the back of the club's kit.
5. Deportivo had a phrase in Chinese characters on the back of its shorts meaning "La Liga is Diverse".
6. Sevilla featured these sponsors only for the 2016 Copa del Rey Final.
7. Referee kits were made by Adidas, sponsored by Würth, and Nike had a new match ball, the Ordem LFP.
8. Additionally, 14 teams showed the logo of Sockatyes in their socks as a result of a sponsorship agreement with the LFP (all except Athletic Bilbao, FC Barcelona, Real Madrid, Real Sociedad, Sevilla and Valencia). Also, in these agreement those teams showed the logo of EA Sports since matchday 13.

=== Managerial changes ===
Team	Outgoing manager	Manner of departure	Date of vacancy	Position in table	Replaced by	Date of appointment
Real Madrid	(Italy) Carlo Ancelotti	Sacked	25 May 2015	Pre-season	(Spain) Rafael Benítez	3 June 2015
Getafe	(Spain) Pablo Franco	Sacked	1 June 2015	Pre-season	(Spain) Fran Escribá	26 June 2015
Eibar	(Spain) Gaizka Garitano	Mutual consent	30 June 2015	Pre-season	(Spain) José Luis Mendilibar	30 June 2015
Las Palmas	(Spain) Paco Herrera	Sacked	19 October 2015	19th	(Spain) Quique Setién	19 October 2015
Levante	(Spain) Lucas Alcaraz	Sacked	26 October 2015	20th	(Spain) Rubi	27 October 2015
Real Sociedad	(Scotland) David Moyes	Sacked	9 November 2015	16th	(Spain) Eusebio Sacristán	9 November 2015
Valencia	(Portugal) Nuno Espírito Santo	Resigned	29 November 2015	9th	(England) Gary Neville	2 December 2015
Espanyol	(Spain) Sergio González	Sacked	14 December 2015	12th	(Romania) Constantin Gâlcă	14 December 2015
Real Madrid	(Spain) Rafael Benítez	Sacked	4 January 2016	3rd	(France) Zinedine Zidane	4 January 2016
Real Betis	(Spain) Pepe Mel	Sacked	10 January 2016	15th	(Spain) Juan Merino (caretaker)	3 February 2016
Granada	(Spain) José Ramón Sandoval	Sacked	22 February 2016	20th	(Spain) José González	22 February 2016
Valencia	(England) Gary Neville	Sacked	30 March 2016	14th	(Spain) Pako Ayestarán	30 March 2016
Getafe	(Spain) Fran Escribá	Sacked	11 April 2016	19th	(Argentina) Juan Esnáider	12 April 2016
Real Betis	(Spain) Juan Merino	End of caretaker spell	9 May 2016	14th	(Uruguay) Gus Poyet	9 May 2016

== Overview ==
On 14 May 2016, Barcelona won their second consecutive and 24th overall La Liga title, following a 3–0 win over Granada at the Estadio Nuevo Los Cármenes on the final matchday. Real Madrid finished one point behind Barcelona as runners-up, having gone on a twelve-match win streak to close out the season. Atlético Madrid ended the season three points off the top in third place, having been eliminated from title contention after a loss to Levante on the penultimate matchday.

Levante were the first team to be mathematically relegated to the Segunda División, following a 1–3 loss against Málaga on 2 May 2016. On 15 May 2016, Sporting Gijón ensured they would remain in the top flight after defeating Villarreal 2–0 and taking advantage of Getafe's loss against Real Betis, which saw Getafe relegated from La Liga for the first time in club history. Rayo Vallecano also went down despite winning their final match of the season.

== League table ==
=== Standings ===
Pos	Team	Pld	W	D	L	GF	GA	GD	Pts	Qualification or relegation
1	Barcelona (C)	38	29	4	5	112	29	+83	91	Qualification for the Champions League group stage
2	Real Madrid	38	28	6	4	110	34	+76	90	Qualification for the Champions League group stage
3	Atlético Madrid	38	28	4	6	63	18	+45	88	Qualification for the Champions League group stage
4	Villarreal	38	18	10	10	44	35	+9	64	Qualification for the Champions League play-off round
5	Athletic Bilbao	38	18	8	12	58	45	+13	62	Qualification for the Europa League group stage (Note: Since the winners of the 2015–16 Copa del Rey, Barcelona, qualified for European competition based on league position, the spot awarded to the cup winners (Europa League group stage) was passed to the sixth-placed team and the spot awarded to the sixth-placed team (Europa League third qualifying round) was passed to the seventh-placed team.)
6	Celta Vigo	38	17	9	12	51	59	−8	60	Qualification for the Europa League group stage
7	Sevilla	38	14	10	14	51	50	+1	52	Qualification for the Champions League group stage (Note: Sevilla qualified for the Champions League group stage by winning the 2015–16 UEFA Europa League. Based on their league position (7th), they would have received the spot above to enter the Europa League third qualifying round. This spot was vacated without replacement as per UEFA regulations.)
8	Málaga	38	12	12	14	38	35	+3	48 (Note: Málaga finished ahead of Real Sociedad on head-to-head record; Málaga 3–1 Real Sociedad, Real Sociedad 1–1 Málaga.)	
9	Real Sociedad	38	13	9	16	45	48	−3	48	
10	Real Betis	38	11	12	15	34	52	−18	45	
11	Las Palmas	38	12	8	18	45	53	−8	44 (Note: Las Palmas finished ahead of Valencia on head-to-head record; Valencia 1–1 Las Palmas, Las Palmas 2–1 Valencia.)	
12	Valencia	38	11	11	16	46	48	−2	44	
13	Espanyol	38	12	7	19	40	74	−34	43 (Note: Espanyol finished ahead of Eibar on head-to-head goal difference; Eibar 2–1 Espanyol, Espanyol 4–2 Eibar.)	
14	Eibar	38	11	10	17	49	61	−12	43	
15	Deportivo La Coruña	38	8	18	12	45	61	−16	42	
16	Granada	38	10	9	19	46	69	−23	39 (Note: Granada finished ahead of Sporting Gijón on head-to-head record; Granada 2–0 Sporting Gijón, Sporting Gijón 3–3 Granada.)	
17	Sporting Gijón	38	10	9	19	40	62	−22	39	
18	Rayo Vallecano (R)	38	9	11	18	52	73	−21	38	Relegation to Segunda División
19	Getafe (R)	38	9	9	20	37	67	−30	36	Relegation to Segunda División
20	Levante (R)	38	8	8	22	37	70	−33	32	Relegation to Segunda División

Source: La Liga, Soccerway
Rules for classification: 1) Points; 2) Head-to-head points; 3) Head-to-head goal difference; 4) Goal difference; 5) Goals scored; 6) Fair-play points; 7) Play-off.
(C) Champions; (R) Relegated

=== Results ===
Home \ Away	ATH	ATM	FCB	CEL	RCD	EIB	ESP	GET	GCF	LPA	LEV	MCF	RVA	RBB	RMA	RSO	SFC	RSG	VCF	VIL
Athletic Bilbao		0–1	0–1	2–1	4–1	5–2	2–1	3–1	1–1	2–2	2–0	0–0	1–0	3–1	1–2	0–1	3–1	3–0	3–1	0–0
Atlético Madrid	2–1		1–2	2–0	3–0	3–1	1–0	2–0	3–0	1–0	1–0	1–0	1–0	5–1	1–1	3–0	0–0	1–0	2–1	0–0
Barcelona	6–0	2–1		6–1	2–2	3–1	5–0	6–0	4–0	2–1	4–1	1–0	5–2	4–0	1–2	4–0	2–1	6–0	1–2	3–0
Celta Vigo	0–1	0–2	4–1		1–1	3–2	1–0	0–0	2–1	3–3	4–3	1–0	3–0	1–1	1–3	1–0	1–1	2–1	1–5	0–0
Deportivo La Coruña	2–2	1–1	0–8	2–0		2–0	3–0	0–2	0–1	1–3	2–1	3–3	2–2	2–2	0–2	0–0	1–1	2–3	1–1	1–2
Eibar	2–0	0–2	0–4	1–1	1–1		2–1	3–1	5–1	0–1	2–0	1–2	1–0	1–1	0–2	2–1	1–1	2–0	1–1	1–2
Espanyol	2–1	1–3	0–0	1–1	1–0	4–2		1–0	1–1	1–0	1–1	2–0	2–1	0–3	0–6	0–5	1–0	1–2	1–0	2–2
Getafe	0–1	0–1	0–2	0–1	0–0	1–1	3–1		1–2	4–0	3–0	1–0	1–1	1–0	1–5	1–1	1–1	1–1	2–2	2–0
Granada	2–0	0–2	0–3	0–2	1–1	1–3	1–1	3–2		3–2	5–1	0–0	2–2	1–1	1–2	0–3	2–1	2–0	1–2	1–3
Las Palmas	0–0	0–3	1–2	2–1	0–2	0–2	4–0	4–0	4–1		0–0	1–1	0–1	1–0	1–2	2–0	2–0	1–1	2–1	0–0
Levante	2–2	2–1	0–2	1–2	1–1	2–2	2–1	3–0	1–2	3–2		0–1	2–1	0–1	1–3	0–4	1–1	0–0	1–0	1–0
Málaga	0–1	1–0	1–2	2–0	2–0	0–0	1–1	3–0	2–2	4–1	3–1		1–1	0–1	1–1	3–1	0–0	1–0	1–2	0–1
Rayo Vallecano	0–3	0–2	1–5	3–0	1–3	1–1	3–0	2–0	2–1	2–0	3–1	1–2		0–2	2–3	2–2	2–2	2–1	0–0	2–1
Real Betis	1–3	0–1	0–2	1–1	1–2	0–4	1–3	2–1	2–0	1–0	1–0	0–1	2–2		1–1	1–0	0–0	1–1	1–0	1–1
Real Madrid	4–2	0–1	0–4	7–1	5–0	4–0	6–0	4–1	1–0	3–1	3–0	0–0	10–2	5–0		3–1	4–0	5–1	3–2	3–0
Real Sociedad	0–0	0–2	1–0	2–3	1–1	2–1	2–3	1–2	3–0	0–1	1–1	1–1	2–1	2–1	0–1		2–0	0–0	2–0	0–2
Sevilla	2–0	0–3	2–1	1–2	1–1	1–0	2–0	5–0	1–4	2–0	3–1	2–1	3–2	2–0	3–2	1–2		2–0	1–0	4–2
Sporting Gijón	0–2	2–1	1–3	0–1	1–1	2–0	2–4	1–2	3–3	3–1	0–3	1–0	2–2	1–2	0–0	5–1	2–1		0–1	2–0
Valencia	0–3	1–3	1–1	0–2	1–1	4–0	2–1	2–2	1–0	1–1	3–0	3–0	2–2	0–0	2–2	0–1	2–1	0–1		0–2
Villarreal	3–1	1–0	2–2	1–2	0–2	1–1	3–1	2–0	1–0	0–1	3–0	1–0	2–1	0–0	1–0	0–0	2–1	2–0	1–0	

Source: La Liga
Legend: Blue = home team win; Yellow = draw; Red = away team win.

== Season statistics ==
=== Scoring ===
- First goal of the season:
  (Spain) Salva Sevilla for Espanyol against Getafe (22 August 2015)
- Last goal of the season:
  (Spain) Álvaro Medrán for Getafe against Real Betis (15 May 2016)

=== Top goalscorers ===
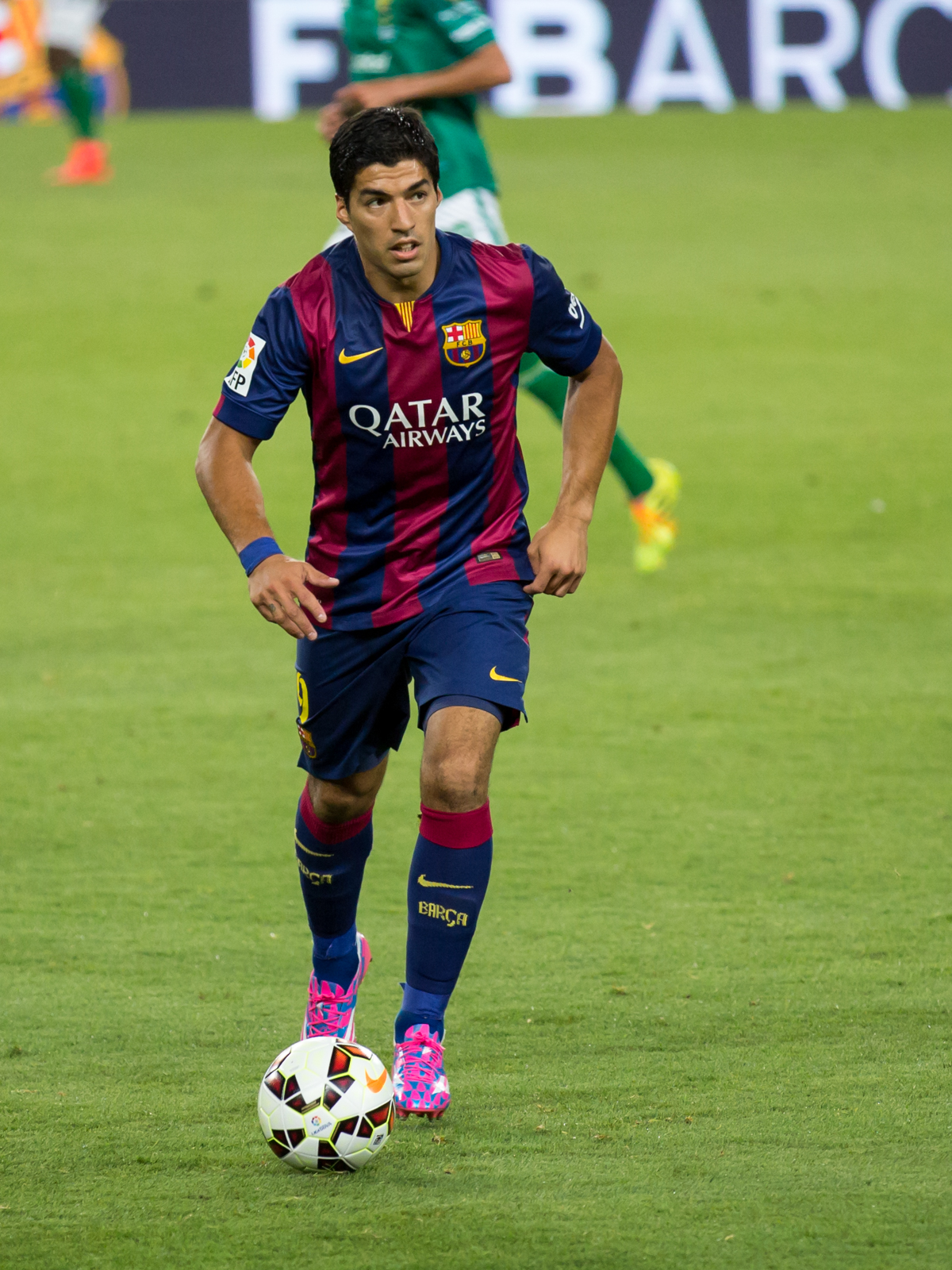
Barcelona's Luis Suárez won the Pichichi Trophy, with his 40 goals in the season also enough for the European Golden Shoe.

Rank	Player	Club	Goals
1	(Uruguay) Luis Suárez	Barcelona	40
2	(Portugal) Cristiano Ronaldo	Real Madrid	35
3	(Argentina) Lionel Messi	Barcelona	26
4	(France) Karim Benzema	Real Madrid	24
4	(Brazil) Neymar	Barcelona	24
6	(France) Antoine Griezmann	Atlético Madrid	22
7	(Spain) Aritz Aduriz	Athletic Bilbao	20
8	(Wales) Gareth Bale	Real Madrid	19
8	(Spain) Rubén Castro	Real Betis	19
10	(Spain) Borja Bastón	Eibar	18

=== Top assists ===
Rank	Player	Club	Assists
1	(Argentina) Lionel Messi	Barcelona	16
1	(Uruguay) Luis Suárez	Barcelona	16
3	(Spain) Koke	Atlético Madrid	14
4	(Brazil) Neymar	Barcelona	12
5	(Portugal) Cristiano Ronaldo	Real Madrid	11
6	(Spain) Marco Asensio	Espanyol	10
6	(Wales) Gareth Bale	Real Madrid	10
6	(Germany) Toni Kroos	Real Madrid	10
6	(Spain) Roberto Soldado	Villarreal	10
10	(Spain) Jonathan Viera	Las Palmas	9

=== Zamora Trophy ===
The Ricardo Zamora Trophy was awarded by newspaper Marca to the goalkeeper with the lowest ratio of goals conceded to matches played. A goalkeeper had to play at least 28 matches of 60 or more minutes to be eligible for the trophy.

Rank	Player	Club	Goals against	Matches	Average
1	(Slovenia) Jan Oblak	Atlético Madrid	18	38	0.47
2	(Chile) Claudio Bravo	Barcelona	22	32	0.69
3	(France) Alphonse Areola	Villarreal	26	32	0.81
4	(Costa Rica) Keylor Navas	Real Madrid	28	34	0.82
5	(Spain) Gorka Iraizoz	Athletic Bilbao	37	36	1.03

=== Hat-tricks ===
Player	For	Against	Result	Date	Reference
(Portugal) Cristiano Ronaldo^{5}	Real Madrid	Espanyol	6–0 (A)	12 September 2015	Report
(Spain) Imanol Agirretxe	Real Sociedad	Granada	3–0 (A)	22 September 2015	Report
(Brazil) Charles	Málaga	Real Sociedad	3–1 (H)	3 October 2015	Report
(Brazil) Neymar^{4}	Barcelona	Rayo Vallecano	5–2 (H)	17 October 2015	Report
(France) Kevin Gameiro	Sevilla	Getafe	5–0 (H)	24 October 2015	Report
(Uruguay) Luis Suárez	Barcelona	Eibar	3–1 (H)	25 October 2015	Report
(Spain) Aritz Aduriz	Athletic Bilbao	Rayo Vallecano	3–0 (A)	29 November 2015	Report
(Paraguay) Antonio Sanabria	Sporting Gijón	Las Palmas	3–1 (H)	6 December 2015	Report
(Wales) Gareth Bale^{4}	Real Madrid	Rayo Vallecano	10–2 (H)	20 December 2015	Report
(France) Karim Benzema	Real Madrid	Rayo Vallecano	10–2 (H)	20 December 2015	Report
(Argentina) Lionel Messi	Barcelona	Granada	4–0 (H)	9 January 2016	Report
(Wales) Gareth Bale	Real Madrid	Deportivo La Coruña	5–0 (H)	9 January 2016	Report
(Uruguay) Luis Suárez	Barcelona	Athletic Bilbao	6–0 (H)	17 January 2016	Report
(Paraguay) Antonio Sanabria	Sporting Gijón	Real Sociedad	5–1 (H)	22 January 2016	Report
(Portugal) Cristiano Ronaldo	Real Madrid	Espanyol	6–0 (H)	31 January 2016	Report
(Uruguay) Luis Suárez	Barcelona	Celta Vigo	6–1 (H)	14 February 2016	Report
(Spain) Aritz Aduriz	Athletic Bilbao	Deportivo La Coruña	4–1 (H)	2 March 2016	Report
(Argentina) Lionel Messi	Barcelona	Rayo Vallecano	5–1 (A)	3 March 2016	Report
(Portugal) Cristiano Ronaldo^{4}	Real Madrid	Celta Vigo	7–1 (H)	5 March 2016	Report
(Uruguay) Luis Suárez^{4}	Barcelona	Deportivo La Coruña	8–0 (A)	20 April 2016	Report
(Spain) Paco Alcácer	Valencia	Eibar	4–0 (H)	20 April 2016	Report
(Morocco) Youssef El-Arabi	Granada	Levante	5–1 (H)	21 April 2016	Report
(Uruguay) Luis Suárez^{4}	Barcelona	Sporting Gijón	6–0 (H)	23 April 2016	Report
(Uruguay) Luis Suárez	Barcelona	Granada	3–0 (A)	14 May 2016	Report

^{4} Player scored four goals
^{5} Player scored five goals
(H) – Home; (A) – Away

=== Discipline ===
- Most yellow cards (club): 136
  - Granada
- Most yellow cards (player): 17
  - Rubén Pérez (Granada)
- Most red cards (club): 10
  - Rayo Vallecano
- Most red cards (player): 2
  - Aythami Artiles (Las Palmas)
  - Gustavo Cabral (Celta Vigo)
  - Nacho Cases (Sporting Gijón)
  - Deyverson (Levante)
  - Sergio Ramos (Real Madrid)
  - Víctor Sánchez (Espanyol)
  - Simão (Levante)

=== Overall ===
- Most wins - Barcelona (29)
- Fewest wins - Deportivo La Coruña and Levante (8)
- Most draws - Deportivo La Coruña (18)
- Fewest draws - Barcelona and Atlético Madrid (4)
- Most losses - Levante (22)
- Fewest losses - Real Madrid (4)
- Most goals scored - Barcelona (112)
- Fewest goals scored - Real Betis (34)
- Most goals conceded - Espanyol (74)
- Fewest goals conceded - Atlético Madrid (18)

== Attendance ==
Pos	Team	Total	High	Low	Average	Change
1	Barcelona	1,486,763	98,902	65,531	78,251	+0.8%
2	Real Madrid	1,286,433	80,148	61,564	67,707	−7.8%
3	Atlético Madrid	820,812	51,933	29,737	43,201	−7.2%
4	Athletic Bilbao	797,268	47,785	37,552	41,961	+3.3%
5	Valencia	709,329	47,217	27,876	37,333	−14.8%
6	Real Betis	686,700	46,061	24,879	36,142	+18.0%^{1}
7	Sevilla	646,007	40,395	21,915	34,000	+9.3%
8	Sporting Gijón	440,723	28,140	19,536	23,196	+20.1%^{1}
9	Deportivo La Coruña	437,148	29,666	16,185	23,008	+8.1%
10	Las Palmas	402,922	28,414	15,819	21,206	+32.4%^{1}
11	Málaga	401,292	28,290	13,909	21,121	−5.1%
12	Real Sociedad	386,468	27,484	12,755	20,340	−8.0%
13	Espanyol	348,353	27,395	12,461	18,334	−1.9%
14	Celta Vigo	342,272	24,519	13,584	18,014	−5.9%
15	Villarreal	318,573	23,450	12,843	16,767	+5.0%
16	Granada	301,361	20,552	12,711	15,861	−3.8%
17	Levante	259,258	22,424	9,225	13,645	−10.6%
18	Rayo Vallecano	218,308	13,775	9,301	11,490	+8.1%
19	Getafe	138,861	12,772	4,532	7,308	−0.7%
20	Eibar	98,868	5,941	4,215	5,204	+8.9%
	League total	10,527,719	98,902	4,215	27,705	+3.6%

Notes:
1: Team played last season in Segunda División.

== Awards ==
=== Seasonal ===
La Liga's governing body, the Liga Nacional de Fútbol Profesional, honoured the competition's best players and coach with the La Liga Awards.

Award	Recipient
Best Player	(France) Antoine Griezmann (Atlético Madrid)
Best Coach	(Argentina) Diego Simeone (Atlético Madrid)
Best Goalkeeper	(Slovenia) Jan Oblak (Atlético Madrid)
Best Defender	(Uruguay) Diego Godín (Atlético Madrid)
Best Midfielder	(Croatia) Luka Modrić (Real Madrid)
Best Forward	(Argentina) Lionel Messi (Barcelona)

=== Team of the Year ===

Team of the Year
Goalkeeper	(Slovenia) Jan Oblak (Atlético Madrid)			
Defence	(Spain) Sergio Ramos (Real Madrid)	(Spain) Gerard Piqué (Barcelona)	(Uruguay) Diego Godín (Atlético Madrid)	(Brazil) Marcelo (Real Madrid)
Midfield	(Spain) Andrés Iniesta (Barcelona)		(Croatia) Luka Modrić (Real Madrid)	(Spain) Sergio Busquets (Barcelona)
Attack	(Argentina) Lionel Messi (Barcelona)		(Uruguay) Luis Suárez (Barcelona)	(Portugal) Cristiano Ronaldo (Real Madrid)

=== Monthly ===
Month	Manager of the Month		Player of the Month		Reference
Month	Manager	Club	Player	Club	Reference
September	(Spain) Marcelino	Villarreal	(Spain) Nolito	Celta Vigo	
October	(Spain) Ernesto Valverde	Athletic Bilbao	(Spain) Borja Bastón	Eibar	
November	(Argentina) Diego Simeone	Atlético Madrid	(Brazil) Neymar	Barcelona	
December	(Spain) Javi Gracia	Málaga	(Spain) Lucas Pérez	Deportivo La Coruña	
January	(Spain) Unai Emery	Sevilla	(Argentina) Lionel Messi	Barcelona	
February	(Spain) Eusebio Sacristán	Real Sociedad	(Venezuela) Miku	Rayo Vallecano	
March	(Spain) Quique Setién	Las Palmas	(Spain) Aritz Aduriz	Athletic Bilbao	
April	(France) Zinedine Zidane	Real Madrid	(Spain) Koke	Atlético Madrid	
May	(Spain) Luis Enrique	Barcelona	(Uruguay) Luis Suárez	Barcelona	

== Broadcasting rights ==
Telefónica purchased the exclusive television broadcasting rights to telecast the 2015–16 season in Spain. Sky Sports had exclusive rights in the United Kingdom, and beIN Sports had exclusive rights to air the season in various countries, including the United States, Canada, MENA, France and the Middle East. KBSN Sports had the exclusive television broadcasting rights in South Korea, apart from internet broadcasting.
