= San Mamés Stadium (2013) =

Football stadium in Bilbao, Spain that opened in 2014

San Mamés
- La Catedral; Katedrala

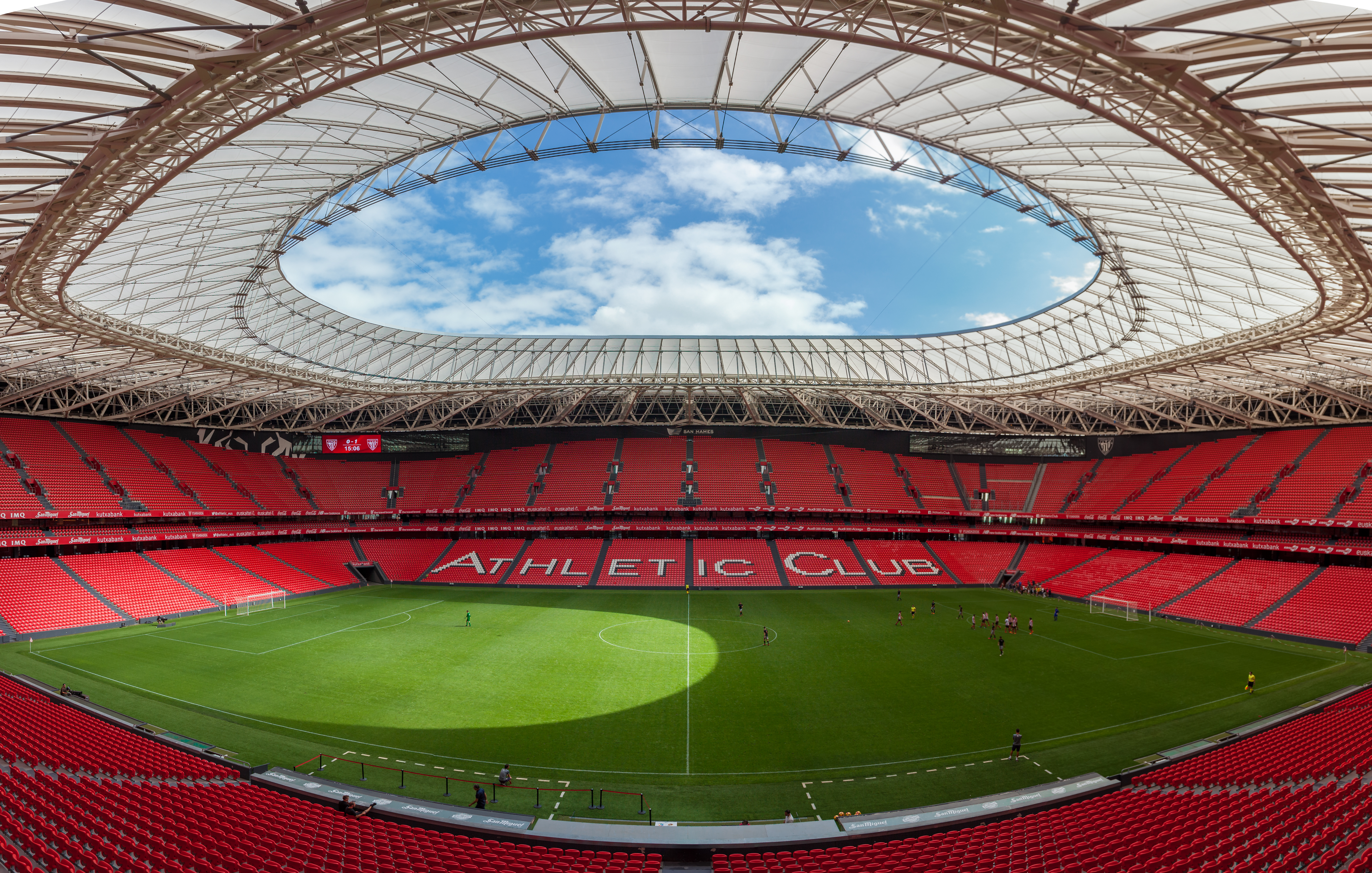
- UEFA
- Interactive map of San Mamés
- Full name: San Mamés
- Location: Bilbao, Basque Country, Spain
- Coordinates: 43°15′51″N 2°57′01″W
- Owner: San Mamés Barria, S.L.
- Operator: Athletic Bilbao
- Capacity: 53,331
- Surface: Grass hybrid
- Record attendance: (Football) 52,114 (Athletic Bilbao vs Rangers, 17 April 2025) (Rugby) 52,282 (Leinster vs Racing 92, 12 May 2018)
- Field size: 105 m × 68 m (344 ft × 223 ft)
- Public transit: San Mamés; San Mamés

Construction
- Groundbreaking: 26 May 2010
- Built: 16 September 2013 (1st phase); 25 August 2014 (complete stadium)
- Opened: 16 September 2013
- Cost: €211 million
- Architects: IDOM; César Azkarate
- Project manager: IDOM

Tenants
- Athletic Bilbao (2013–present); Athletic Bilbao B (2015–2016); Basque Country national football team (2013–present)

The San Mamés Stadium (also known as Nuevo San Mamés or San Mames Barria) is an all-seater football stadium in Rafael Moreno Pitxitxi Kalea, Bilbao, Basque Country, Spain. Inaugurated on 16 September 2013, the stadium replaced the "old" San Mamés as the home of Athletic Bilbao. With a capacity of 53,331 seats, San Mamés is the seventh-largest stadium in Spain and the largest in the Basque Country.

== History ==
=== Planning and construction ===
The first stages of planning occurred as early as 2004, with initial contracts signed late on in 2006, after receiving approval to build in March 2006. The new stadium was to be built next to the existing San Mamés on land that was occupied until 2003 by the Bilbao International Trade Fair.

On 26 May 2010 at 12:00, the ground-breaking ceremony took place at San Mamés. The event was attended by: the Lehendakari of the Basque Country, Patxi López; the Deputy-General of Biscay, José Luis Bilbao; the Mayor of Bilbao, Iñaki Azkuna; the Chairman of Bilbao Bizkaia Kutxa, Mario Fernández; the President of the Royal Spanish Football Federation, Ángel María Villar and the President of Athletic Club, Fernando García Macua.

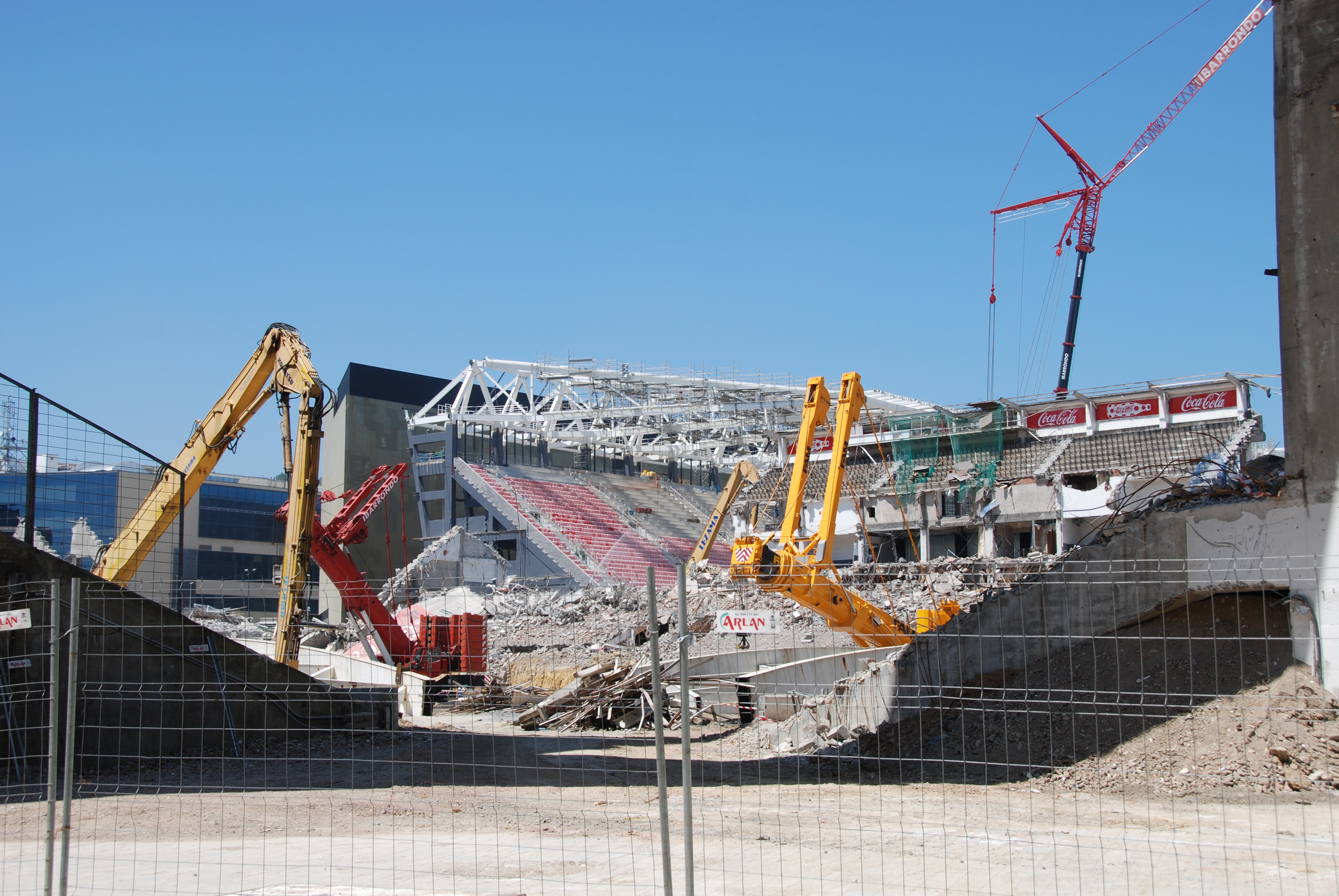
Old stadium demolished with new stadium rising behind, June 2013

In a symbolic display, a piece of turf and a brick from the facade were removed from the old stadium and carried to the adjacent construction site by a human chain including famous players Iribar, Larrazábal, Iturraspe and Muniain as well as members of the youth system, the women's team, the reserve team and its oldest and youngest registered supporters.

Initially, three-quarters of the new stadium were built and then matches took place in it, while the old one was demolished to make room to complete the new arena.

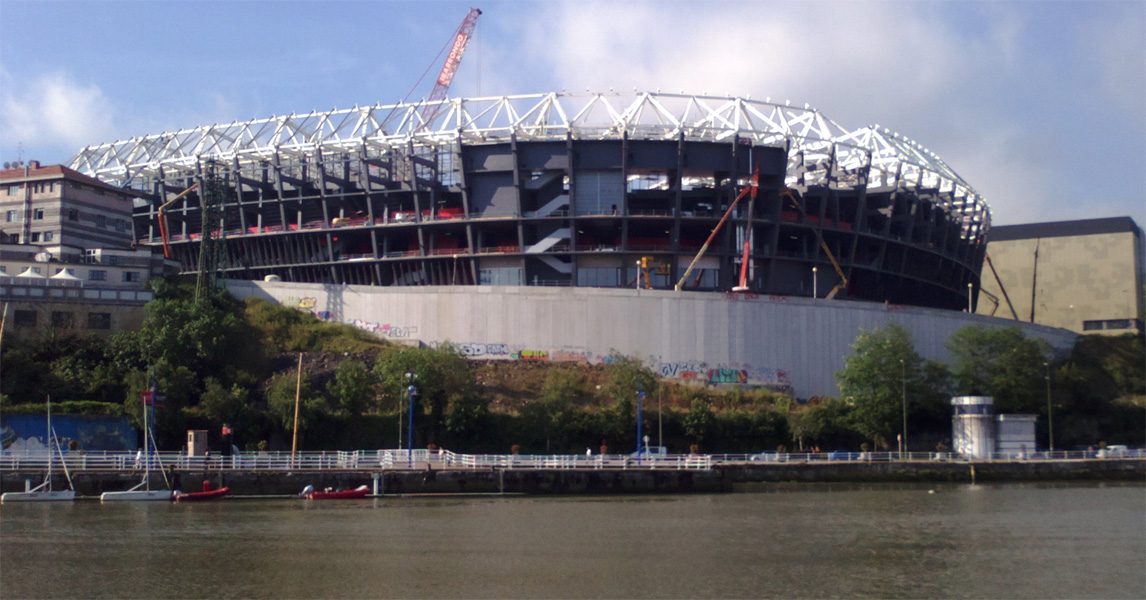
Construction in progress, June 2013

Despite the economical woes the country was going through at the time, especially the Basque people, 52.6% of the total €211 million (£178 million) cost of the stadium was paid by public institution—some by the Basque Government (€50m), some by the Bilbao City Council (€11m) and some by the Biscay Provincial Council (€50m including land), as well as Athletic (€50m including land) and BBK/Kutxabank (€50m), on the proviso that the stadium would include facilities for use by the public such as a sports centre. It had been believed that the European Commission were investigating this use of public funds for any possible impropriety in the deal, but in late 2013 it was confirmed by Joaquín Almunia, the commissioner for competition at the time (and an Athletic supporter from Bilbao), that no such case was being pursued.

=== Initial opening ===
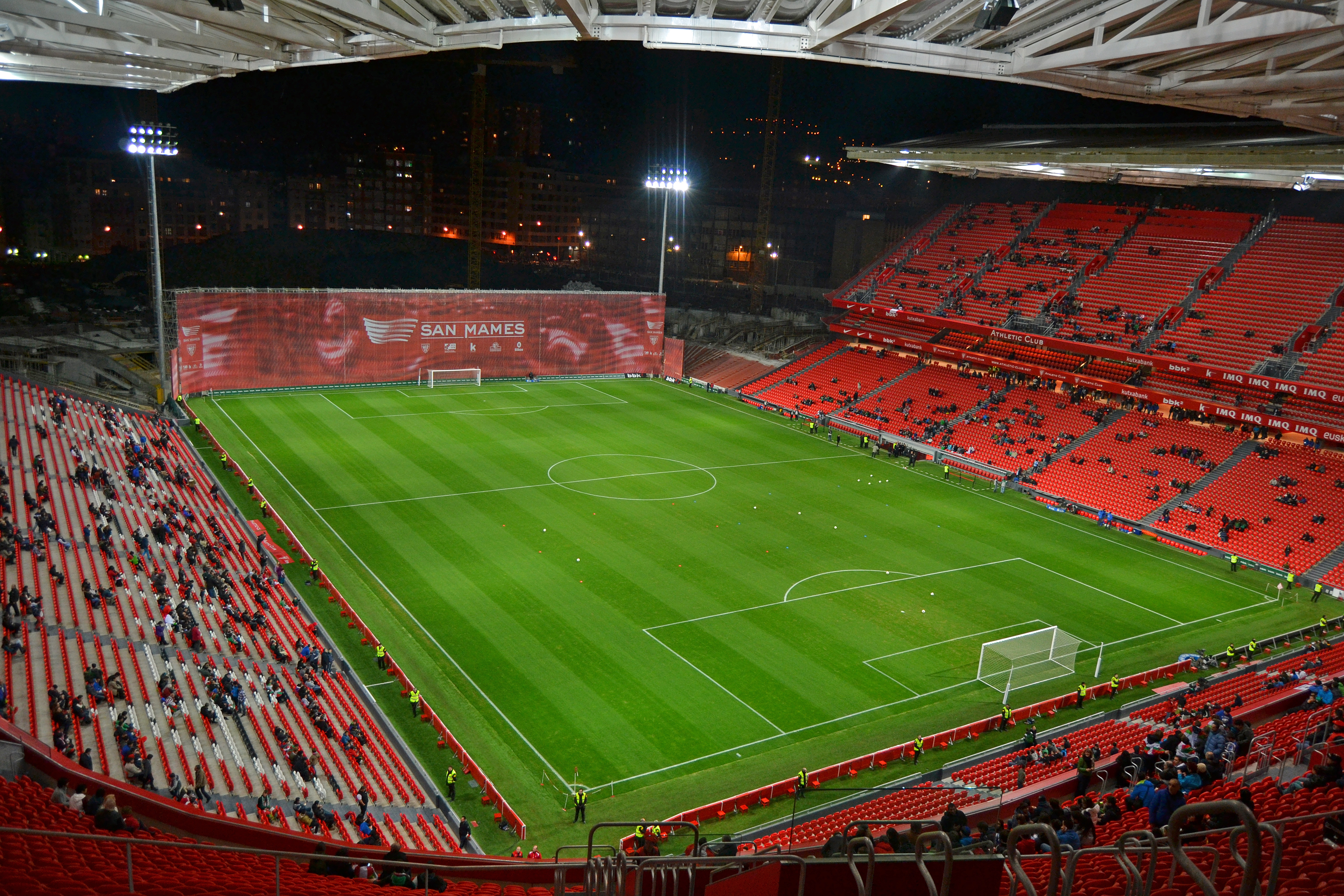
Partially completed, December 2013

San Mamés was inaugurated on 16 September 2013, 102 days after the final game at the old stadium. At that time the official capacity of the partially completed arena was 35,686. The first match was a league match played at 22:00 between the hosts Athletic Club and Celta Vigo, which the local team won 3–2. A crowd of 33,000 was in attendance. The distinction of being the first ever goalscorer at the stadium went to Celta's Charles, while the first Athletic scorer was Mikel San José a few minutes later. Prior to the match, the captains of each of the club's age group teams, club captain Carlos Gurpegui and president Josu Urrutia took part in a short presentation accompanied by a traditional Aurresku dance.

The Celta match was Athletic's second home fixture of that season. As the new stadium was not quite ready, their opening game of the campaign (a 2–0 win over Osasuna) was played at Anoeta in Donostia-San Sebastián, home of rivals Real Sociedad.

=== Completion ===
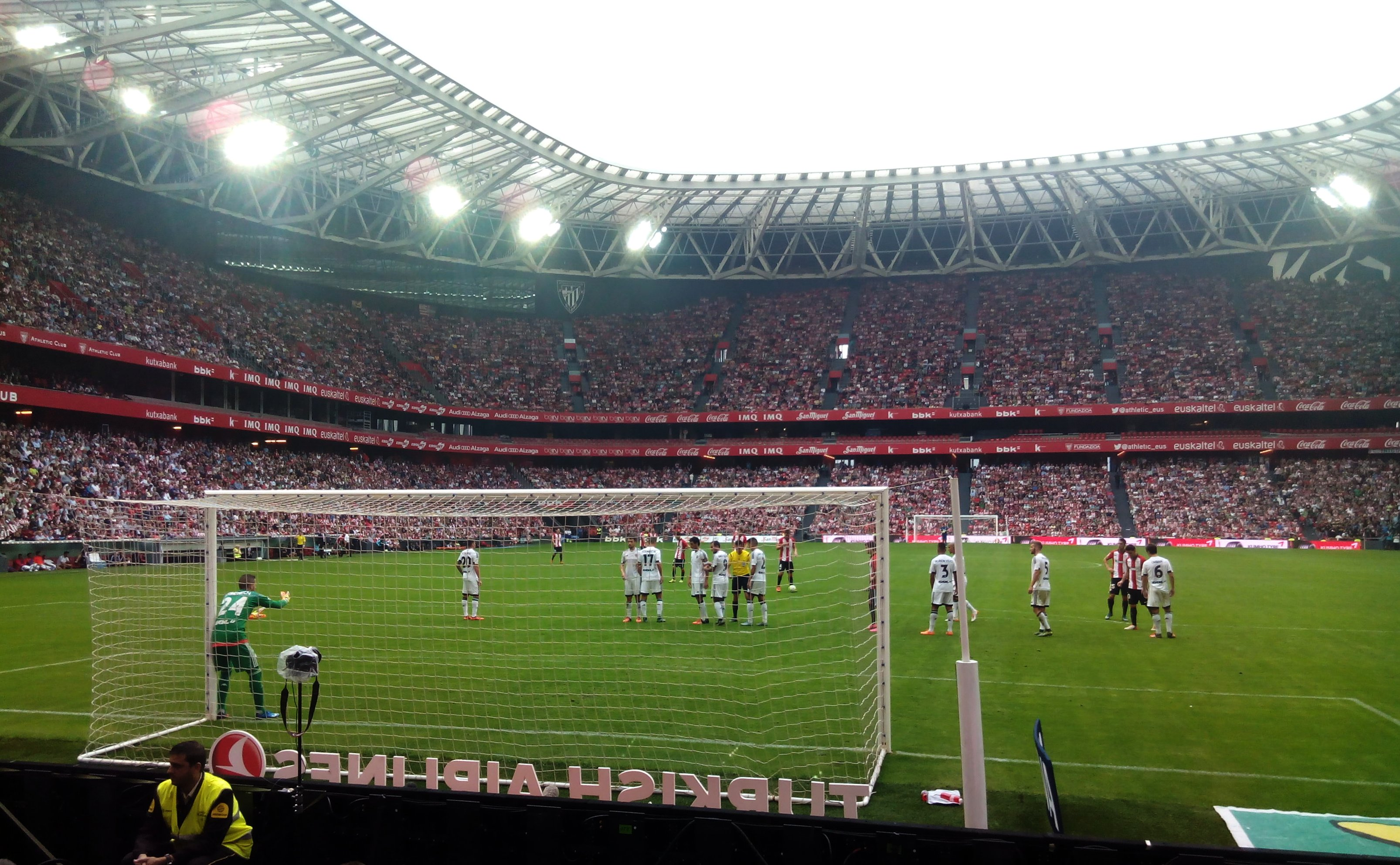
Athletic in action, 2015, showing the roof prior to its 2017 enlargement

The first match in the stadium under its full capacity was a Champions League playoff tie against Napoli on 27 August 2014, attended by 49,017. Athletic won 3–1 to progress to the group stage of the competition.

=== Roof extension ===
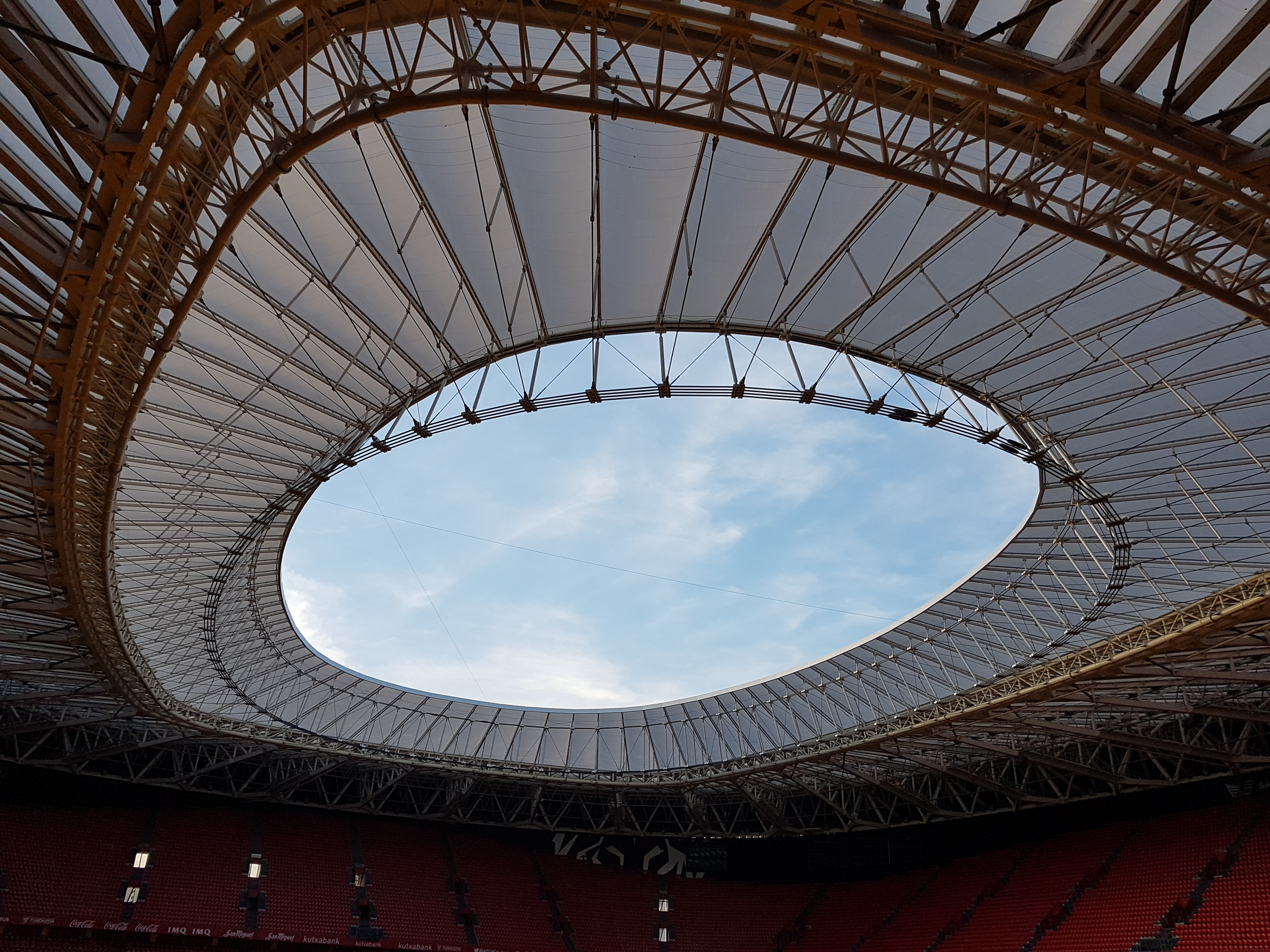
View up to the extended roof (2017)

Since the stadium's opening, supporters had frequently voiced their displeasure at the roof, which did not protect all seats from Bilbao's frequently rainy conditions. Towards the end of the 2015–16 season, throughout the summer break and at the outset of 2016–17, extensions were added to the roof at a cost (borne solely by the club) of €12.6 million, estimated to increase the effectiveness against wet weather by 70%. On 20 November 2016 the works were completed and the roof extension was fully functional in the 1–0 victory against Villarreal in a La Liga match. The lack of sunlight onto the pitch from the roof is offset by internal lighting modules which maintain the condition and growth of the turf, a system used in other Spanish stadiums. The extension design won an international structural engineering award in 2017.

== Stadium features ==
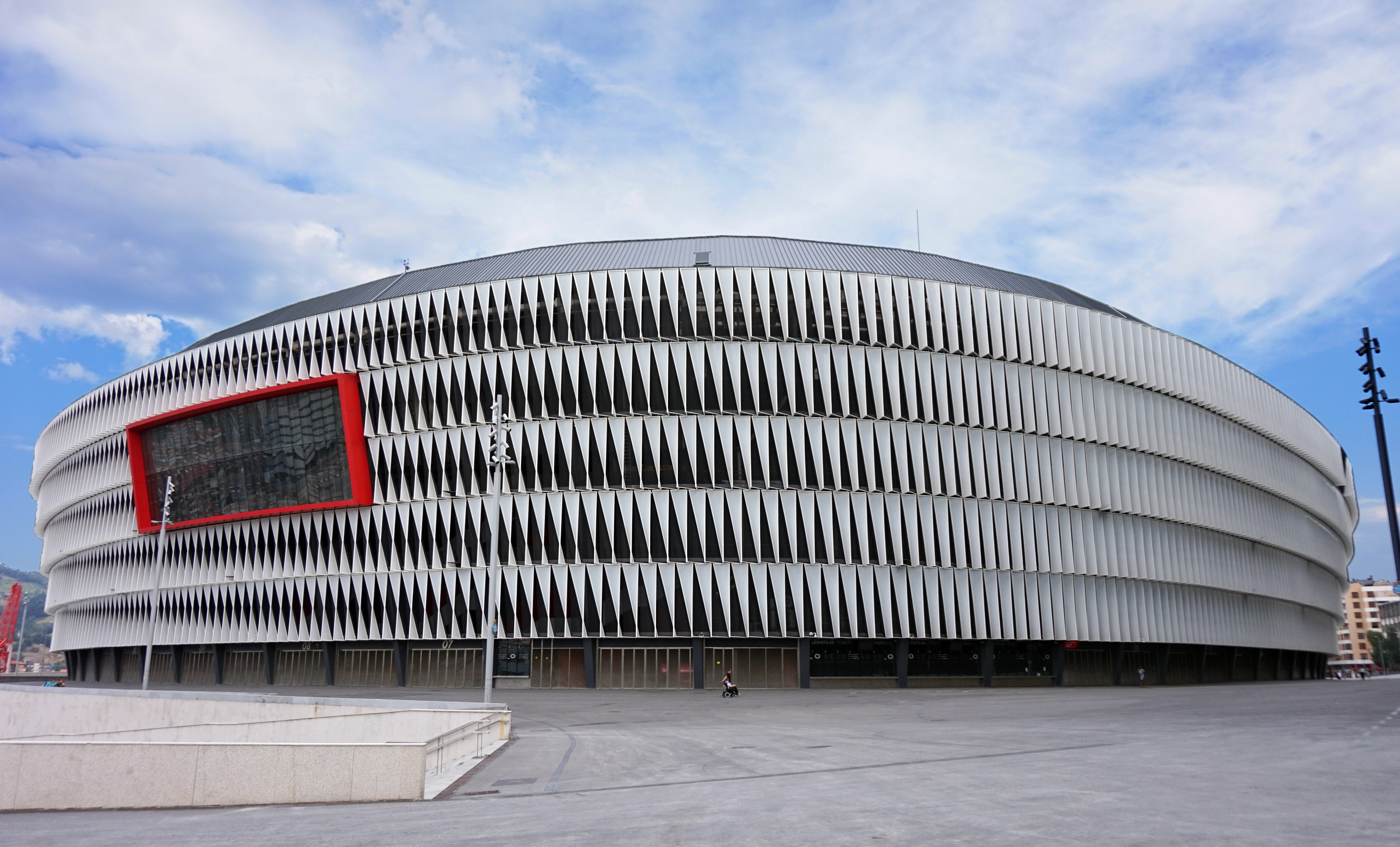
The stadium facade by daylight

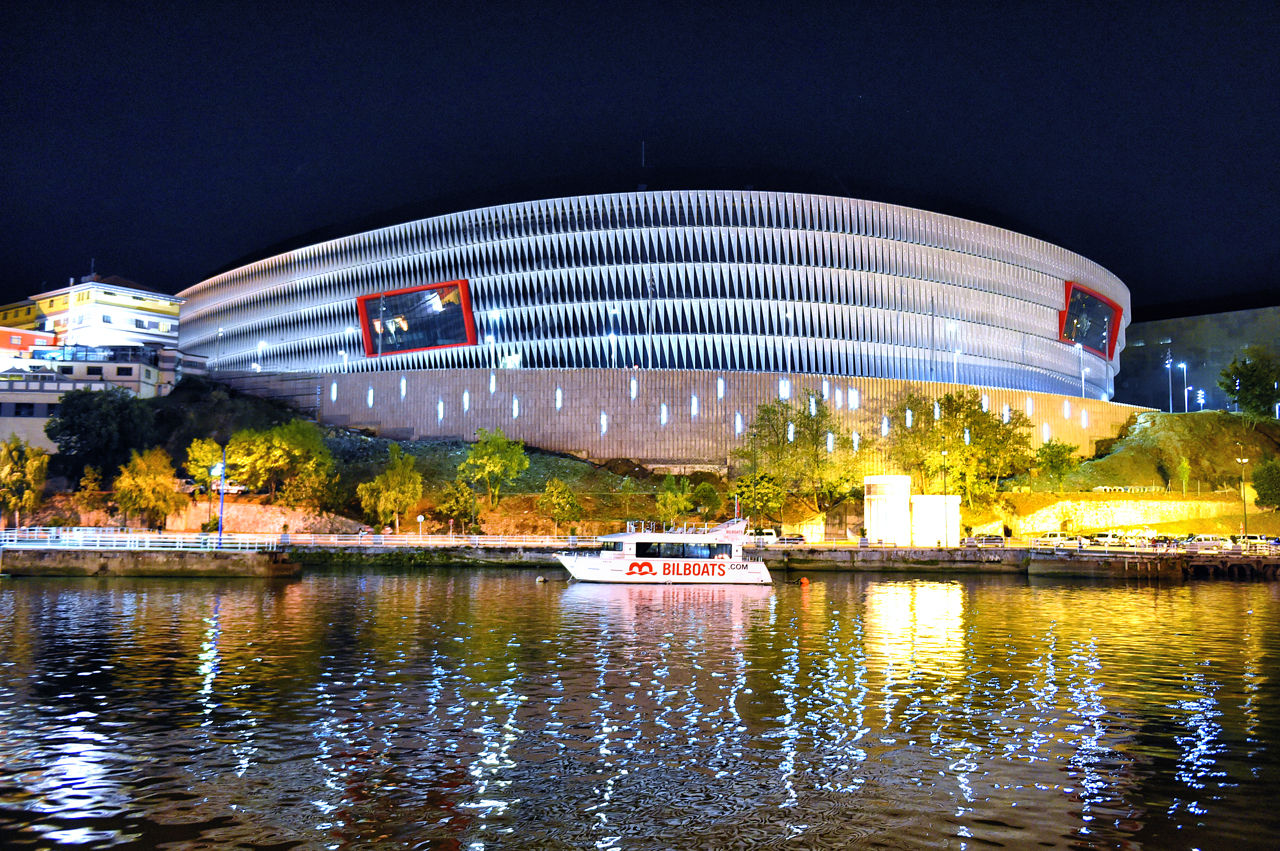
The facade at night, illuminated

The stadium is equipped with a sophisticated lighting system on its exterior which can be programmed to illuminate the hundreds of panels on its facade (which by day are white) in solid colours, or to show flashing or moving graphics (such as when a goal is scored, or the UEFA Champions League star-ball motif when Athletic qualified for that competition). It has similarities in this respect with the Allianz Arena in Munich.

It is also situated closer to the Nervión than its predecessor, overlooking the river from a high bank. Its elevated position presents a striking image of the stadium, particularly when illuminated.

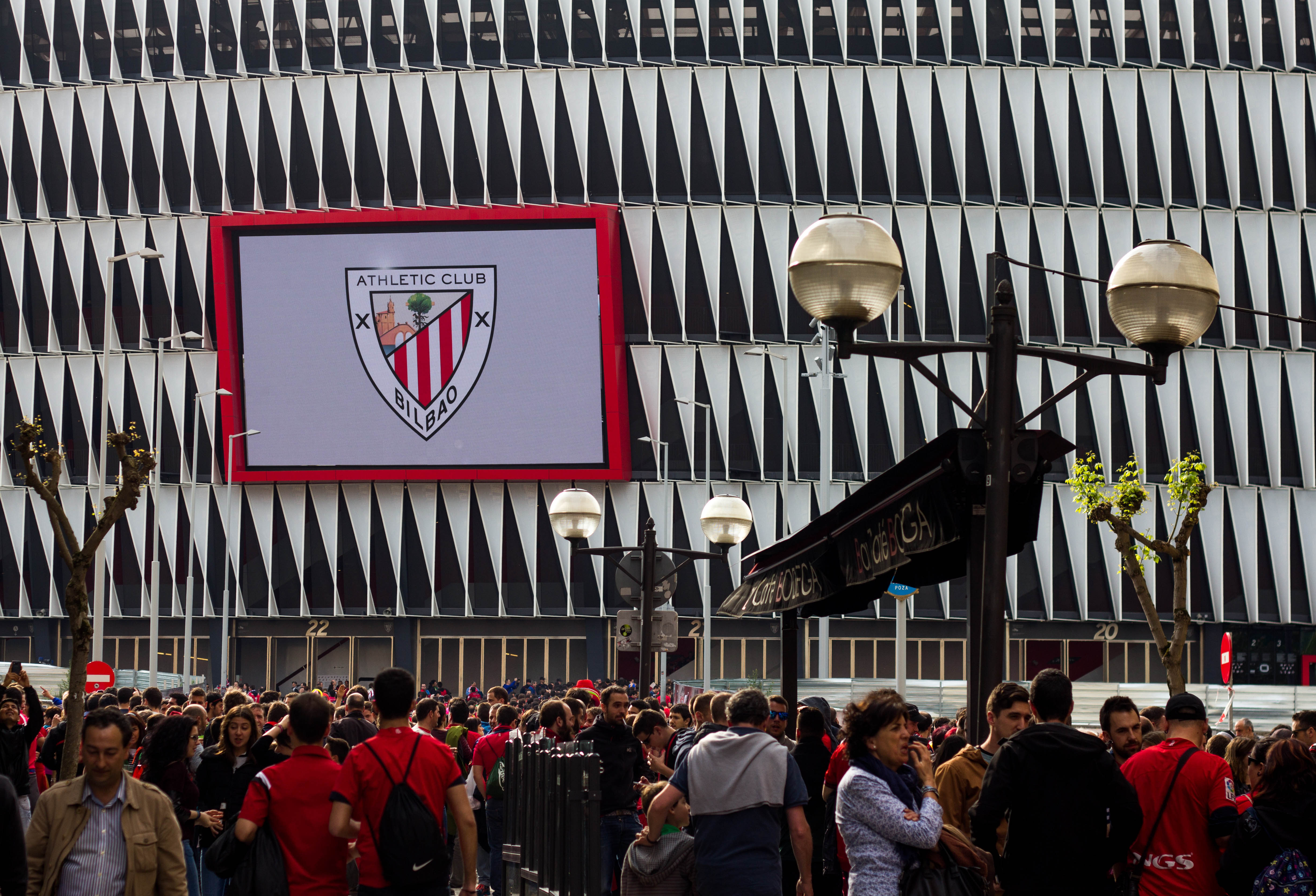
External video screen

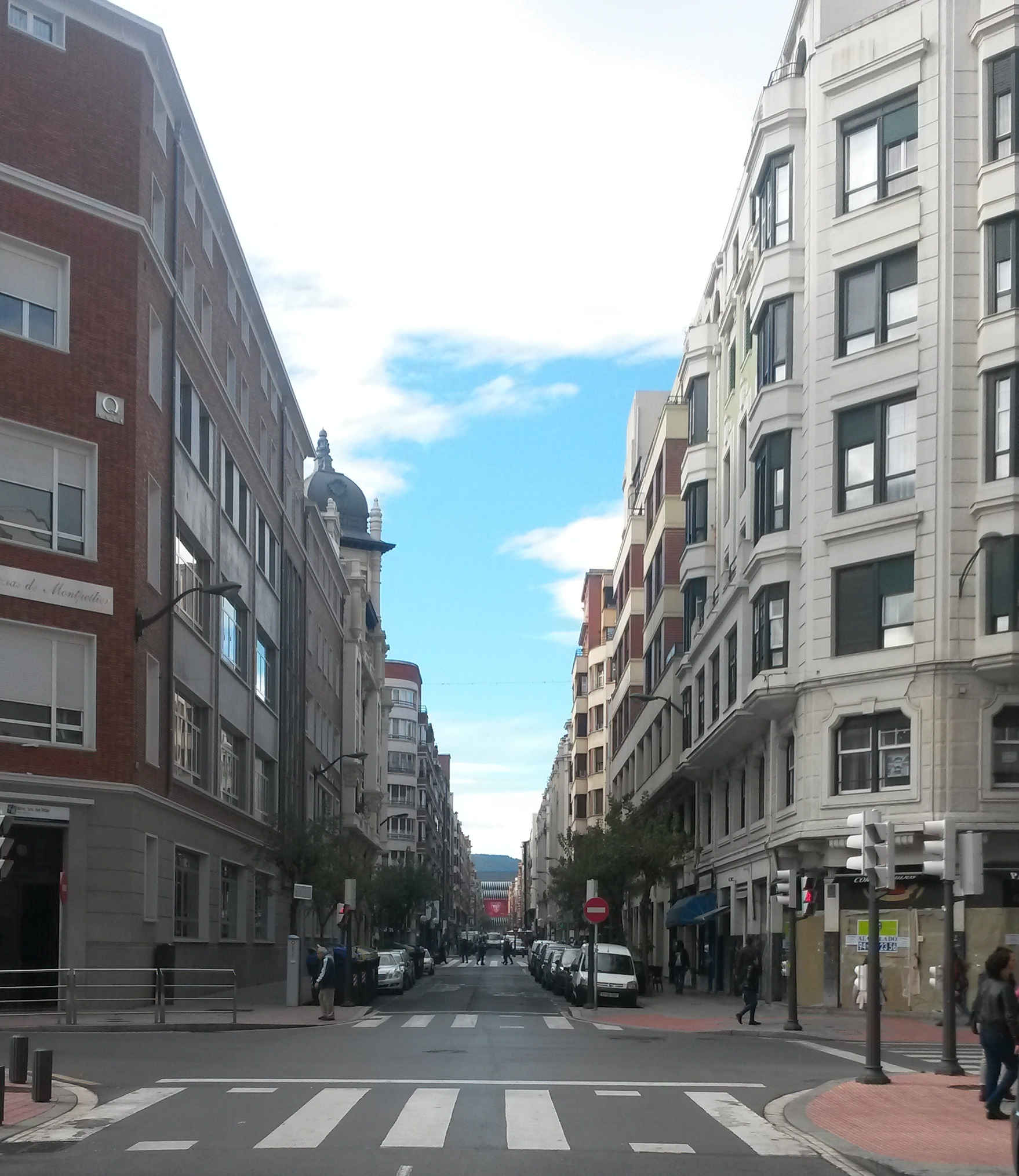
View looking west along the Pozas towards the screen, 2014

The stadium also features a giant external video screen (15.5m X 9.8m), placed in a prominent position at the same point where the original San Mamés featured a large club crest. It looks onto the Pozas, a street running to the stadium from the heart of the city which is a popular walking route for fans on matchdays and is lined with Athletic-themed bars.

It is a club tradition for captains of teams visiting the Athletic ground for the first time pay homage to the fallen idol of its early years, Pichichi, by leaving a bouquet of flowers at a bust of the player. In the old stadium, this was situated near the directors' box. Despite concerns that this iconic feature might not be accommodated at the new stadium, a suitable spot was identified at the entrance to the players' tunnel, allowing the tradition to continue at the new location from 2013 onwards.

In August 2017, Athletic opened their new club museum at the stadium. The feature had been absent since the closure of the old stadium over four years earlier. Among the prominent features of the museum is a stuffed lion (the club nickname) 'won' from the president of Alavés in 1984 after he lost a bet with the Athletic directors that the club would not be able to repeat their 1982–83 La Liga win the following season.

Safe standing rail seats were installed in part of the north stand in 2019, later expanded into a 'singing section' across the whole lower tier at that end of the ground in 2022.

As part of the club's 125th anniversary celebrations in 2023, a subtle feature was unveiled in the open space outside the stadium depicting the exact placement of the goal lines of the old pitch, followed later by a statue of the appearance record holder José Ángel Iribar.

== Special events and information ==
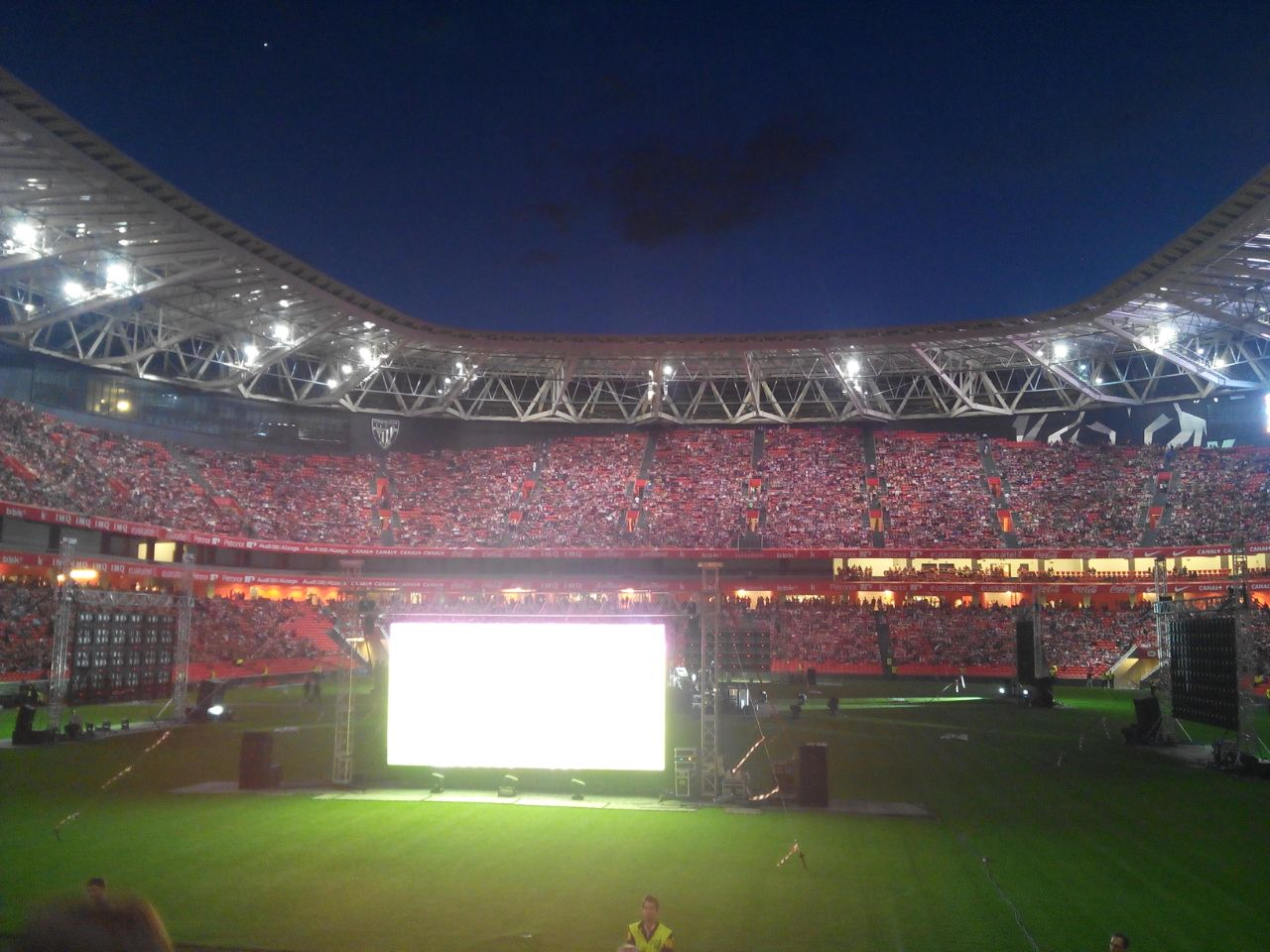
'Beam back' of 2015 Copa del Rey Final

The new San Mamés was the venue for three friendly fixtures played by the unofficial Basque Country team between 2013 and 2016.

A 'beam back' event was held at the stadium in May 2015 for the 2015 Copa del Rey final for fans who could not attend the game in Barcelona, with giant video screens installed on the pitch that the spectators could view from the stands.

On 5 November 2015, San Mamés was awarded as the Sports Building of the Year in the World Architecture Festival held in Singapore.

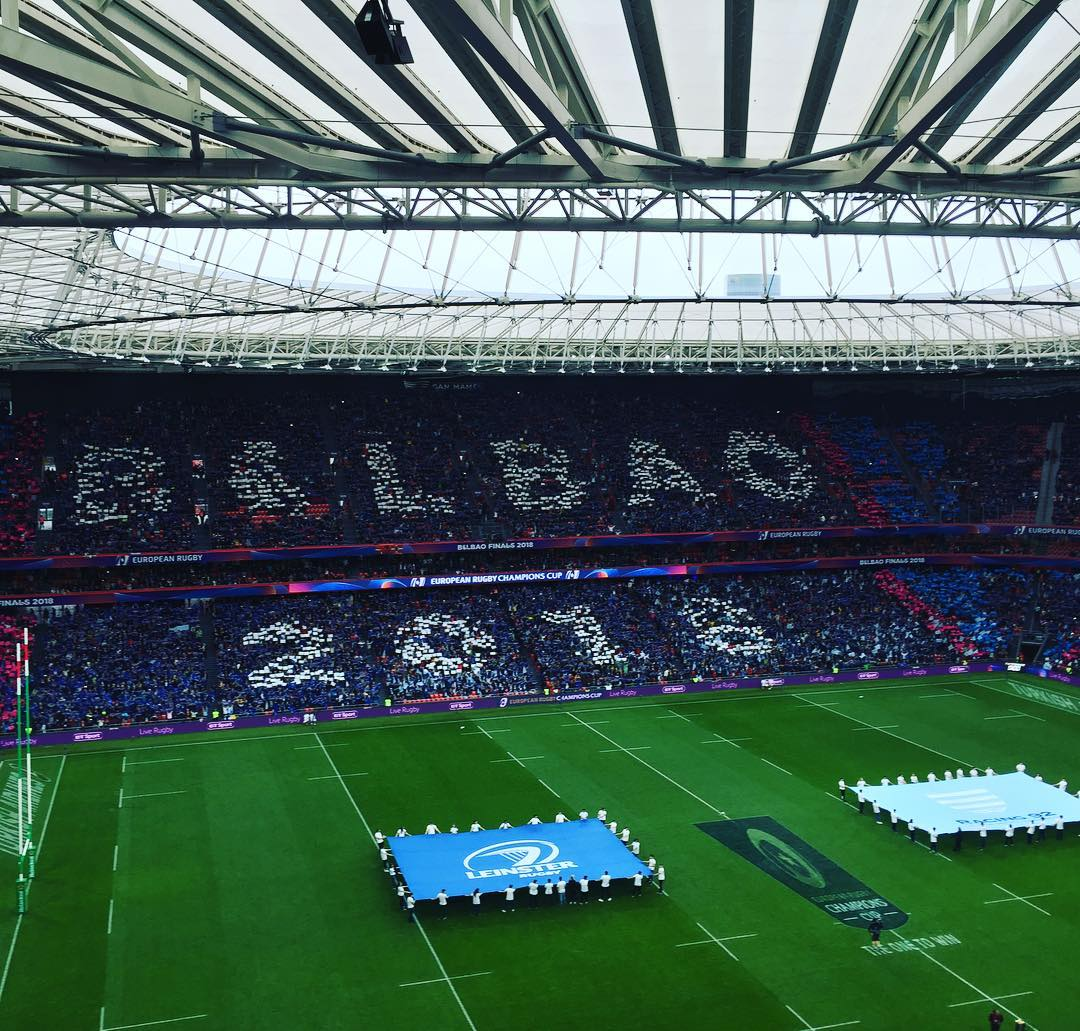
Card stunt at the rugby finals, May 2018

In 2017, there was a realistic possibility that the stadium could host the Copa del Rey final for the first time after Alavés from nearby Vitoria-Gasteiz qualified for the showpiece game to face Barcelona. However, the stadium's controlling agency announced that it would not be feasible to accommodate the final on 27 May due to holding a Guns N' Roses concert on 30 May. The Copa final was subsequently assigned to the Vicente Calderón Stadium in Madrid, the 14th time that venue has hosted the final but significant due to it being one of the last matches prior to its replacement by the rebuilt Estadio Metropolitano.

The stadium hosted a MTV World Stage concert headlined by Berri Txarrak, Muse and Crystal Fighters on 3 November 2018, as part of the events related to the 2018 MTV Europe Music Awards being held in Bilbao.

On 30 January 2019, San Mamés hosted a Copa de la Reina match between Athletic Bilbao and Atlético Madrid that beat the Spanish attendance record for a women's football match with 48,121 spectators.

The neutralised start of stage 13 in the 2019 Vuelta a España included a lap of the pitch by the race director's car followed by the riders. Although a large crowd had gathered outside the stadium, the public were not allowed inside to view the event. Two cyclists (Edward Theuns and Pierre Latour) dismounted to mime taking a penalty. A similar event had preceded stage 5 of the 2017 Tour of the Basque Country. The Grand Départ (race start) of the 2023 Tour de France took place outside the stadium.

=== UEFA Euro 2020 and 2025 UEFA Europa League Final ===
On 19 September 2014, San Mamés was selected as one of the 13 venues to host matches at UEFA Euro 2020. It was to host three group stage matches and one round of 16 match in the tournament. Spain would have played all their group matches at the stadium, the first time the national team played in the Basque Country for more than 50 years (the old San Mamés hosted six games between 1921 and 1967 and a single fixture was played in San Sebastián in 1923). However, ultimately San Mamés was replaced by La Cartuja in Seville due to the COVID-19 pandemic in Spain, with infection rates higher in the Basque Country than in Andalusia at the time of making final arrangements for the tournament in April 2021.

On 16 July 2021, the UEFA Executive Committee announced that due to the withdrawal of hosting rights for Euro 2020, San Mamés was given hosting rights for the 2024 UEFA Women's Champions League final and the 2025 UEFA Europa League final. This was part of a settlement agreement by UEFA to recognise the efforts and financial investment made to host UEFA Euro 2020.

The 2025 UEFA Europa League final was hosted at the stadium, which Tottenham Hotspur won, defeating Premier League rivals Manchester United 1-0. The only goal of the match was scored by Brennan Johnson.

=== Rugby Champions Cup and Challenge Cup Finals ===
The stadium hosted the 2018 finals of the European Rugby Challenge Cup and Champions Cup. The match between Leinster and Racing 92 set the stadium single-game attendance record at 52,282.

The finals returned to the stadium in 2026 with Bordeaux Bègles beating Leinster 41–19 in the Champions Cup Final and Montpellier beating Ulster 59–26 in the Challenge Cup Final. The Champions Cup Final attendance beat the previous record coming in at 52,327.

In October 2026, the Spanish Rugby Federation announced their intention to bid for the 2035 Rugby World Cup with the San Mamés Stadium, among the list of names proposed for hosting tournament fixtures.

=== Concerts ===
Concerts at San Mamés Stadium
Date	Artist	Tour	Attendance
30 May 2017	Guns N' Roses	Not in This Lifetime... Tour	27,955
11 June 2022	Fito & Fitipaldis	Cada vez cadáver Tour	46,822
3 July 2022	Metallica	Metallica 2021–2022 Tour	TBA

== Access ==
The stadium is well served by public transport: it is located across the street from the city's Termibus regional bus station, and has a dedicated station—San Mamés—which links the tram, metro and commuter rail networks. The major AP-8 road is also nearby. The stadium is also within a reasonable walking distance from most areas of the city centre, e.g. approximately 2 km from Casco Viejo (the old town).

Preceded by Murrayfield; Edinburgh	European Rugby Champions Cup; Final venue 2017–18	Succeeded by St. James' Park; Newcastle
Preceded by Viola Park; Vienna	UEFA Women's Champions League; Final venue 2024	Succeeded by Philips Stadion; Eindhoven
Preceded by Aviva Stadium; Dublin	UEFA Europa League; Final venue 2025	Succeeded by Beşiktaş Stadium; Istanbul
