= José Antonio Romero =

Spanish football manager

Personal information
- Full name: José Antonio Romero Morilla
- Date of birth: 26 December 1959 (age 66)
- Place of birth: La Roda de Andalucía, Spain
- Height: 1.78 m (5 ft 10 in)

Managerial career
- Years: Team
- 2004–2005: Córdoba B
- 2005–2009: Montilla
- 2009–2011: Córdoba (youth)
- 2013–2015: Córdoba B
- 2015: Córdoba (interim)

José Antonio Romero Morilla (born 11 June 1980) is a Spanish football manager.

== Manager career ==
Born in La Roda de Andalucía, Seville, Andalusia, Romero made his managerial debuts with Córdoba CF B, after being linked with the club for more than 20 years. On 29 June 2006 he was appointed Montilla CF manager, remaining in charge for three seasons but failing to achieve a promotion.

In 2009 Romero returned to Córdoba CF, now named as manager of the youth sides. Two years later, after taking the side to an impressive run in Copa del Rey Juvenil, he was appointed director of the youth setup.

On 15 October 2013 Romero returned to the Verdiblancos' reserve team, replacing fired Pepe Puche. On 16 March 2015, after Miroslav Đukić's dismissal, he was named interim manager of the main squad in La Liga.

Romero appeared in his first professional match on the 22nd, a 1–3 away loss against Real Sociedad. After failing to win a single match and suffering relegation as dead last, he was relieved from his duties, being named director of the club's Ciudad Deportiva.
