= Neinor Homes =

Spanish real estate company

- ISIN: ES0105251005
- Industry: real estate
- Founded: 2015; 11 years ago in Bilbao, Spain
- Founder: Kutxabank & Lone Star Funds
- Headquarters: Bilbao, Basque Country (Spain)
- Key people: Borja García-Egotxeaga (CEO)
- Website: www.neinorhomes.com

Neinor Homes S.A. is a Spanish real estate company headquartered in Bilbao, specializing in the development, promotion, and management of residential properties across Spain.

== History ==
Founded in its current form in May 2015, the company emerged after the investment firm Lone Star Funds acquired the residential development arm of the Basque bank Kutxabank, an entity with a history in the sector dating back to 1988. In March 2017, Neinor Homes completed an initial public offering (IPO) on the Spanish stock exchanges, marking the first time a residential developer in Spain had gone public since the 2008 financial crisis.

The company’s business model has evolved from traditional homebuilding to a diversified residential platform. In 2021, Neinor Homes significantly expanded its market share by merging with Quabit Inmobiliaria, and in late 2025, it further consolidated its leadership through the acquisition of a majority stake in Aedas Homes.

== Operations ==
The company focuses its operations on high-demand regions, including Madrid, Catalonia, the Basque Country, Andalusia, and the Balearic Islands.

In January 2026, Neinor Homes manages a substantial land bank capable of developing over 40,000 units and has expanded into the Build-to-Rent (BTR) market and third-party asset management. The firm frequently utilizes BREEAM environmental certifications for its developments and is led by CEO Borja García-Egotxeaga.

== Ownership ==
Among notable shareholders are notably Juan Pepa and Felipe Morenés via their investment vehicle, Stoneshield Capital. These figures maintain an active role in the firm's governance alongside other major institutional investors, including Adar Capital Partners and Orion Capital Managers.
