= CajaSur =

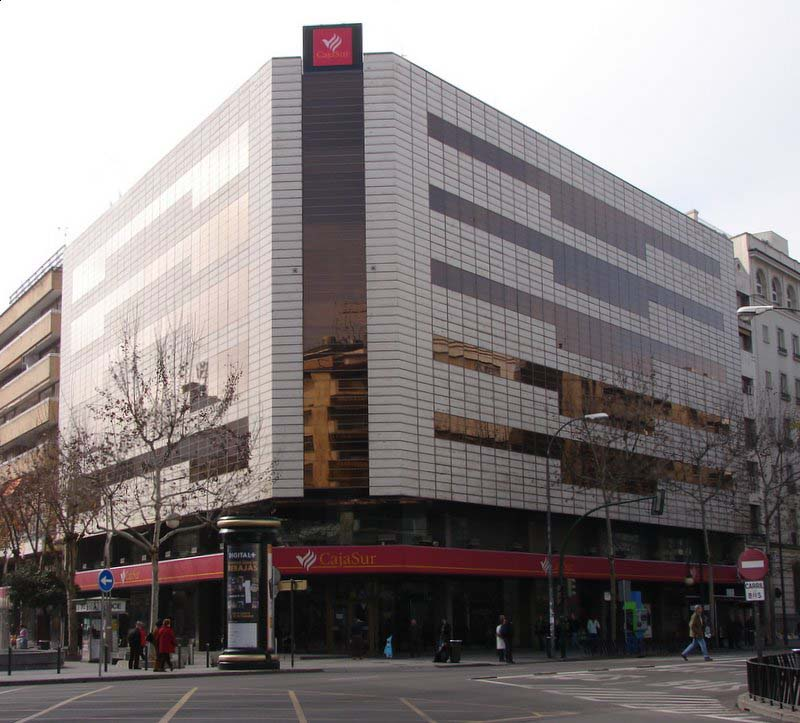
- Company type: Caja de ahorros
- Industry: Financial services
- Founded: 1864; 162 years ago
- Headquarters: Córdoba, Spain
- Products: Banking services
- Website: portal.cajasur.es/cs/Satellite/cajasur/es/particulares_0/

CajaSur is a Spanish savings bank that is owned by Kutxabank. It has offices in Andalusia and Extremadura.

== History ==
Until 2011, CajaSur was a Spanish savings bank, run by the priests in the Catholic Church, located in Córdoba, Spain. It was seized in May 2010 and defaulted in December 2010.

== See also ==
- List of banks in Spain
