= Kutxa =

Spanish bank

Gipuzkoa Donostia Kutxa
- Industry: Financial services
- Founded: 1990
- Headquarters: San Sebastián, Basque Autonomous Community, Spain
- Key people: Xabier Iturbe (chairman)
- Products: Banking, insurance
- Website: www.kutxa.net
- Footnotes / references BIC/SWIFT code: CGGKES22 (up to 2014)

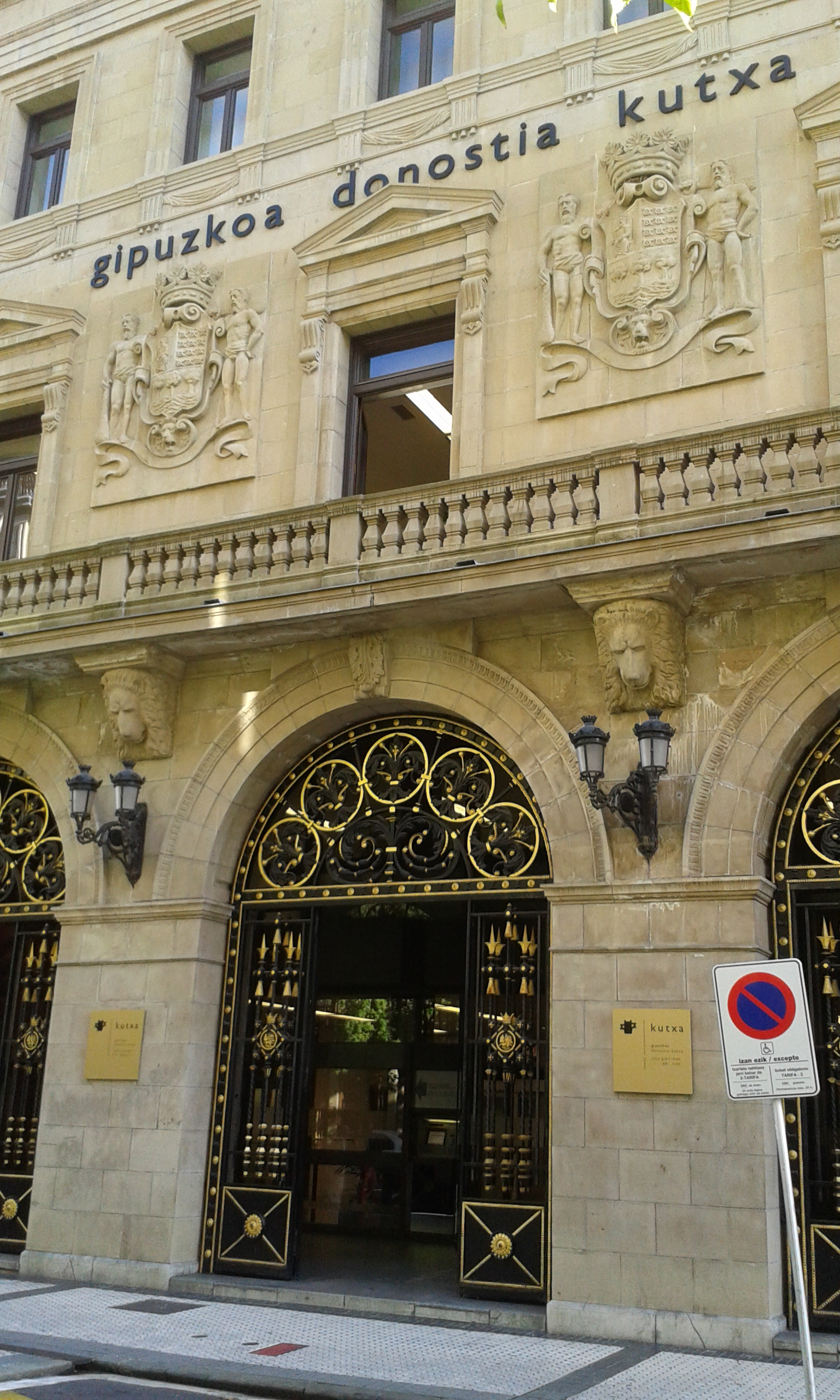
Main entrance to Kutxa headquarters in San Sebastián

The Kutxa (pronounced [ˈkutʃa]; short for Basque: Gipuzkoa eta Donostiako Aurrezki Kutxa "Savings Bank of Gipuzkoa and San Sebastián") is a savings bank mainly operating within a regional scope in the Gipuzkoa province of Spain. Its Spanish name is Caja de Ahorros y Monte de Piedad de Gipuzkoa y San Sebastián but it was re-branded as Kutxa. On 1 January 2012 it merged with other Basque financial entities (a "loose merger"), Bilbao Bizkaia Kutxa (BBK) and Caja Vital Kutxa, to form Kutxabank.

== Government ==
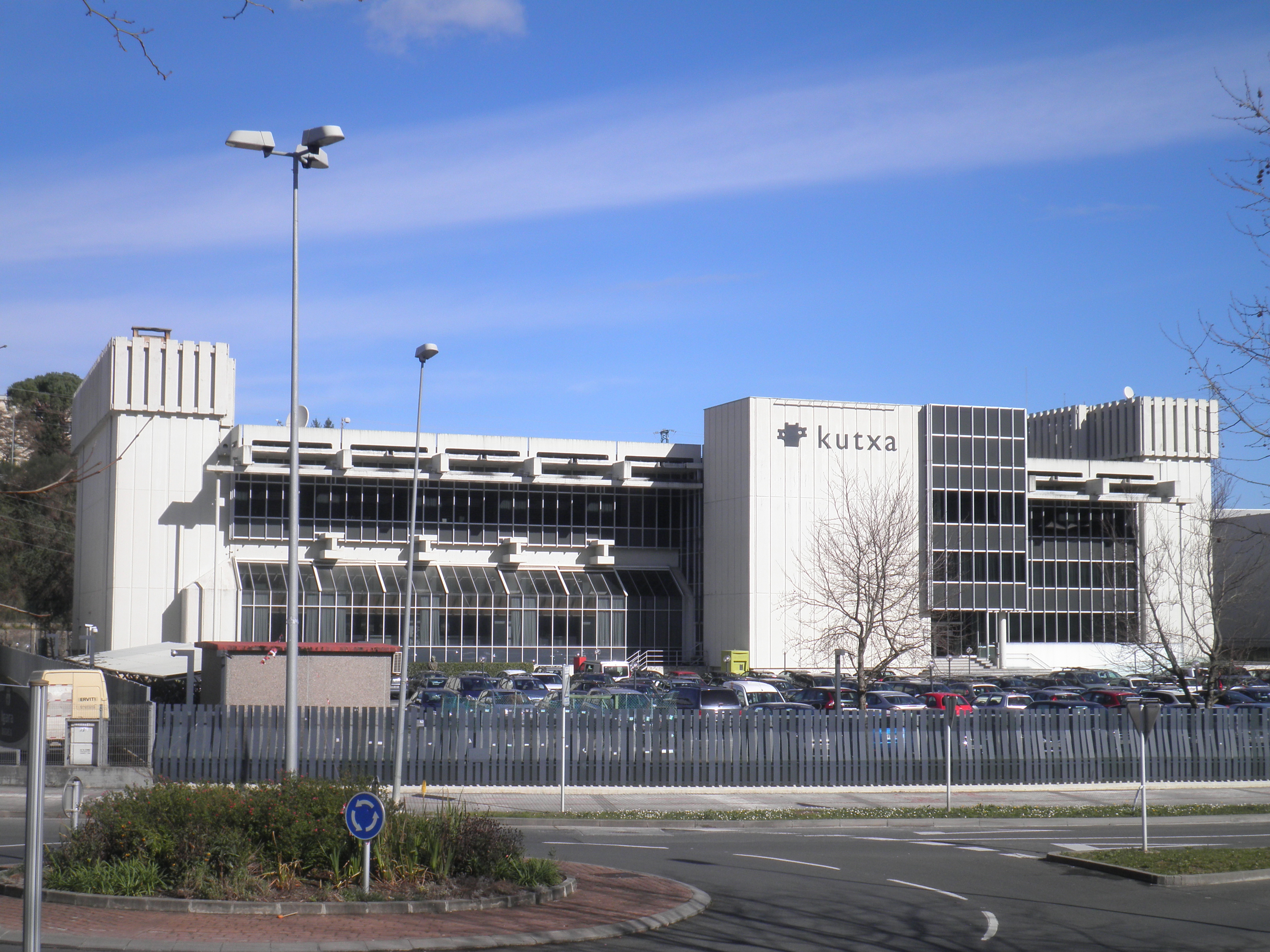
Kutxa building in San Sebastián

Kutxa, like the rest of Basque savings banks, was founded in the years following the definite loss of the charters (1876) in the middle of growing industrial development and new business opportunities. It constitutes a financial entity with entrenched roots in the social and economic fabric of Gipuzkoa, featuring an intricate system of management and internal control organs:

- The General Assembly: 79 seats representing the founding agencies (14 seats), private depositors (36), town councils where the savings bank holds branches (14), operative staff (6), organizations representing collective interests (4), and those representing the historic territory of Gipuzkoa (5). It holds a regular session once a year.
- Administration Board: Deputy organ appointed by the General Assembly in charge of the administration and management of the financial institution, as well as its Community Fund (“Gizarte Ekintza/Obra Social”). Its 15 independent deputies are elected by the General Assembly.
- Investment Commission: It holds the responsibility of notifying the Administration Board of strategic and stable investments due for approval.
- Audits Commission: An informative and consultive organ in charge of monitoring election and appointment processes, renewal and cover of vacants occurring in the Institutional Governing Organs, as well as informing the Control Commission as set out by the Act 11/2011, 14 June, of the Savings Bank of the Basque Autonomous Community.
- Community Fund Commission: Organ in charge of ensuring the due operation of the Community Fund.

== History ==
The origins of Kutxa go back to 1879, when the ‘’Caja de Ahorros y Monte de Piedad Municipal de San Sebastián’’ was founded in the city of San Sebastián with a view to providing credit for business. In 1896 the ‘’Caja de Ahorros Provincial de Guipúzcoa’’ followed. In 1990 both entities merged into a single savings bank, hereafter known by the commercial name of Kutxa. In 2006 it had 128 offices in Gipuzkoa, where it was the first financial entity, and some other 145 offices out of this territory. It then commenced a steady expansion period. Its staff amounted in 2006 to above 2,500 employees. However, since the eruption of the economic crisis (2008) and the savings banks’ merger, Kutxa has undergone a restructuring, cutting down significantly the amount and distribution of Kutxa branches.

== Latest developments ==
The move to form Kutxabank in 2012 did not result in a full-blown merger. Instead the management boards of each savings bank opted to keep their own identity and certain autonomy, a decision coming in for strong objections led by circles close to the Basque nationalist left, who initially opposed any convergences but eventually advocated for a complete merger.

After the bankruptcy of a number of Spanish banks and their rescue by the Spanish public coffers, the European financial institutions conditioned a bailout to Spain on a requirement to the Madrid Government to transform the organizational structure of the savings banks and the liberalization of their capital share, exposing them to the domestic and international financial market.

The General Assembly, united in session held on 23 October 2014, decided the conversion of Kutxa into a bank foundation and passed new statutes regulating the institution. The decision supported by the representatives of political parties PNV, PSE, PP, union CCOO, and association Pixkanaka, followed like decisions made by their peer financial institutions in Álava (Vital Kutxa) and Biscay (BBK). A proposal to convert Kutxa into a regular foundation put forward by the Regional Government of Gipuzkoa and representatives of EH Bildu was rejected after heated debate. On 26 October 2014, the results of the latest stress test carried out by the European Central Bank on European banks confirmed Kutxabank, integrated by Kutxa, as the healthiest financial institution in Spain (data for late 2013), doubling the minimum requirements imposed by the European test.

== Companies of which Kutxa holds shares ==
Kutxa holds shares of a wide variety of companies (investment funds, financial ones, insurances, industry, services, etc.). Among the most significant shares are an 11% of the Construcciones y Auxiliar de Ferrocarriles (C.A.F.), 22.98% of Euskaltel, 9.98% of Banco Guipuzcoano, 3,01% of Zeltia, 5% of Grupo Recoletos, 3% of NH Hotels, 17% of Ingelectric, 41,73% of Ibermática, etc.

== Criticism ==
Despite their remarkable performance in the Basque and Spanish context, the Basque savings banks have got directly entangled in the general measures exacted by the Spanish Government on banking. The 2013 governmental decisions, reportedly meant to target bankrupt and mismanaged financial institutions, made no operative distinctions between healthy or corrupt banks. The central government's measures also point to additional political implications in that they may overrule existing Basque attributions and powers on banking and foundations, as set out on the Basque Statute of Autonomy.

The Conservative Spanish Government has pointed to a necessity for transparent and efficient management, but it is itself badly affected by corruption scandals by 2015 (arrest of Rodrigo Rato, former Bankia president, ex-vice Prime Minister, and ex-president of the IMF). The two main Basque political parties, as well as grass-roots associations have voiced their concern for the transformation of the institution.

The Basque branch of the Socialists has not opposed the move, while the Basque Nationalist Party has seen no legal option out, begrudgingly accepting a conversion of Kutxa into a bank foundation. Meanwhile, EH Bildu, the leading political force in Gipuzkoa has bitterly criticized the new course of Kutxa on the grounds that the re-foundation of the institution releases internal control organs, and calls into question the effective continuity of the Community Fund. The left-wing Basque nationalists cite in that respect the mismanagement and failure of Caja Navarra in Navarre, one that refused to join a merger of Basque-Navarrese savings banks in the 2000s.

== See also ==
- List of banks in Spain
