= Bilbao Bizkaia Kutxa =

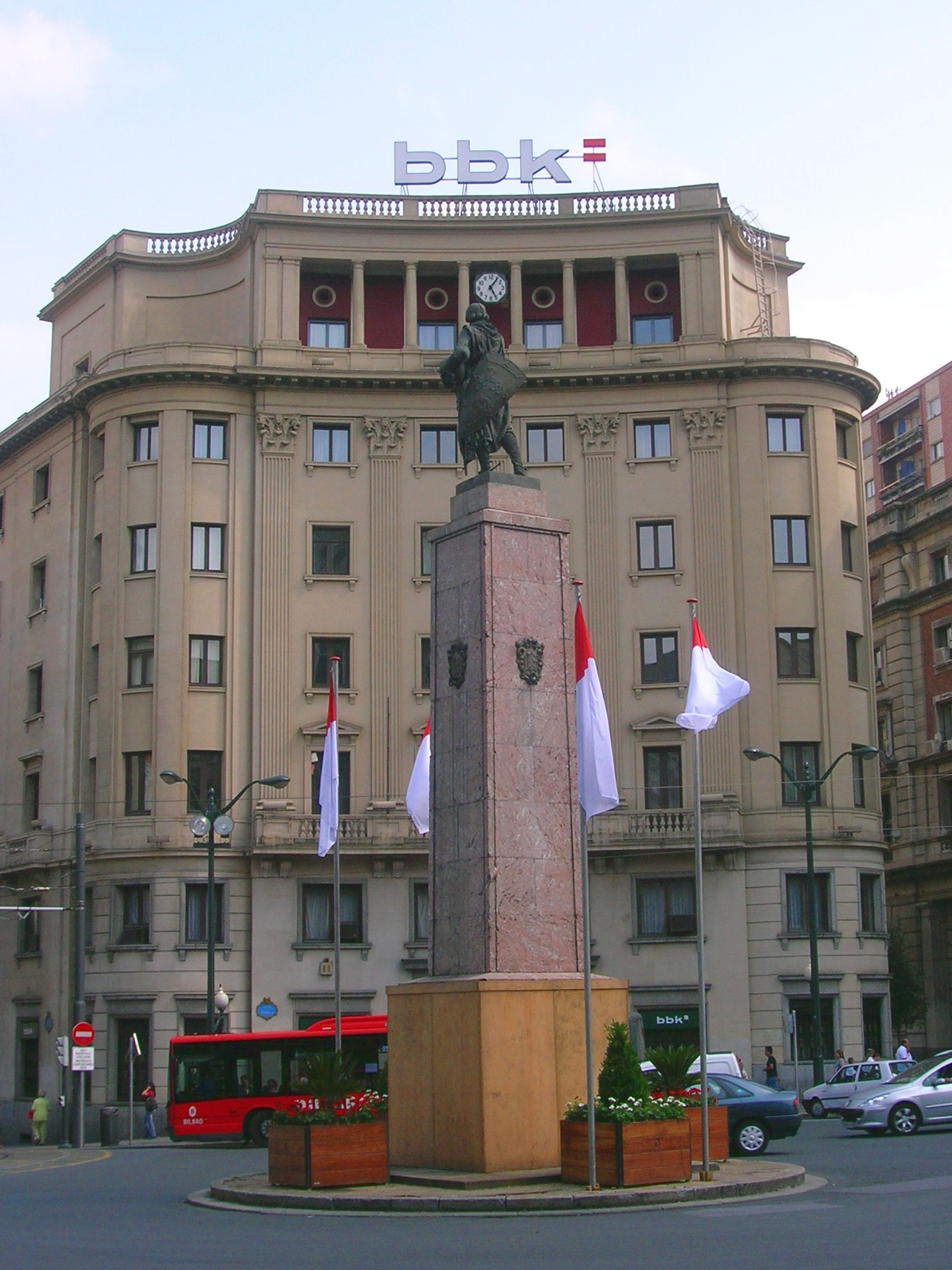
- Industry: Financial services
- Founded: 1990
- Headquarters: Bilbao, Spain
- Key people: Mario Fernandez (Chairman)
- Products: Banking, insurance
- Website: www.bbk.es

Bilbao Bizkaia Kutxa (BBK) was a bank in Spain. On June 30, 2014, the General Assembly of BBK approved the transformation of the entity into a banking foundation, in accordance with the Law on Savings Banks and Banking Foundations.

In Biscay, the name "BBK" is maintained as a trademark of Kutxabank, an entity of which the foundation owns part of the shareholding (as of December 2023, 57%).

== History ==
(Basque for 'Bilbao Biscay Savings Bank') was a Spanish savings bank based in the province of Biscay in the Basque Country, Spain. Its full name was Bilbao Bizkaia Kutxa, Aurrezki Kutxa eta Bahitetxea (in Spanish Caja Bilbao Vizcaya, Caja de Ahorros y Monte de Piedad). It was formed in 1990 when the Caja de Ahorros Municipal de Bilbao and the Bizkaiko Aurrezki Kutxa-Caja de Ahorros Vizcaína were merged. The company headquarters were in Bilbao. On 1 January 2012 it merged with other Basque financial entities (a "loose merger"), Kutxa and Caja Vital Kutxa, to form Kutxabank.

BBK won a bid to take over CajaSur on 16 July 2010. The transaction created the 7th largest financial institution of Spain.

The savings bank had minority investments in the following companies: Iberdrola 6,84%, Euskaltel 33,99%, Enagas 5%, Red Eléctrica 2,2%.

On September 16, 2011, the extraordinary assembly of BBK approved the creation of Kutxabank, through which it has been conducting its financial activities since January 1, 2012. Kutxabank was established through a SIP (Sistema Institucional de Protección) alongside Caja Vital and Kutxa.

On June 30, 2014, the General Assembly of BBK approved the transformation of the entity into a banking foundation, in accordance with the Law on Savings Banks and Banking Foundations.

== See also ==
- List of banks in Spain
