= Kutxabank =

Spanish bank

Kutxabank, S.A.
- Company type: Sociedad Anónima
- Industry: Financial services
- Predecessor: Bilbao Bizkaia Kutxa; Gipuzkoa Donostia Kutxa; Caja Vital Kutxa
- Founded: 1 January 2012; 14 years ago
- Headquarters: Bilbao, Spain
- Key people: Gregorio Villalabeitia Galarraga (Chairman), Francisco Javier García Lurueña (CEO)
- Products: Universal banking, insurance, investment holdings
- Net income: ▲€330.5 million (2022)
- Total assets: €71.138 billion (Q1 2026)
- Number of employees: ▼5,343 (2022)
- Website: www.kutxabank.com

Kutxabank is a Spanish bank founded and based in Bilbao. It was officially created on 1 January 2012 out of the merger of three Basque financial institutions operating in their respective provinces: Bilbao Bizkaia Kutxa (BBK), based in Bilbao; Gipuzkoa Donostia Kutxa (Kutxa), based in San Sebastián; and Caja Vital Kutxa (Vital) based in Vitoria-Gasteiz.

As required by the Spanish Government's bank merger deadline, all three institutions ceased to exist as savings banks after a long period of internal deliberation and integration. Kutxabank operates in Andalusia and Extremadura with the brand CajaSur.

Kutxabank has been designated as a Significant Institution since the entry into force of European Banking Supervision in late 2014, and as a consequence is directly supervised by the European Central Bank.

== History ==
The European stress test measuring solvency in periods of credit crisis showed that Kutxabank ranked first in Spain, standing out as the soundest financial institution (data published in October 2014). A report issued by the European Bank Authority in December 2020 considered Kutxabank the most solvent bank in Spain, also ranking higher than the European average.

== See also ==
- List of banks in the euro area
- List of banks in Spain
- Neinor Homes, former Kutxabank real estate agency
