= Ruiz-Mateos, el primer fenómeno viral =

Spanish television series

- Genre: Docuseries
- Written by: Àlex Solà
- Directed by: Roger Gual
- Country of origin: Spain
- Original language: Spanish
- No. of seasons: 1
- No. of episodes: 4

Production
- Running time: c. 50 minutes
- Production companies: RTVE; Lavinia Audiovisual

Original release
- Network: RTVE Play
- Release: 27 October 2021

Ruiz-Mateos, el primer fenómeno viral is a four-part streaming television docuseries directed by Roger Gual focusing on the figure of Spanish businessman José María Ruiz-Mateos. It was released on RTVE Play on 27 October 2021.

== Premise ==
A winemaking businessman from Jerez de la Frontera with connections to the Opus Dei thriving in the years of the Transition, José María Ruiz-Mateos was the founder of Rumasa, which became a holding of hundreds of companies employing a considerable workforce and constituting a 2% share of the Spanish GDP in the early 1980s. Investigated due to banking irregularities, the whole holding (which turned out to be financially unsustainable) was expropiated outright in 1983 on the basis of massive tax avoidance and the impending bankruptcy. From then on, Ruiz Mateos launched an all-out propaganda war against the Government of Spain in order to keep the public attention (a media circus consisting of stagings such as threatening politicians, punching the finance minister Miguel Boyer, dressing up as Superman or asking one of his many daughters to throw a cake to Isabel Preysler). After fleeing from justice twice, he served as member of the European Parliament from 1989 to 1994. He also put his wife, Teresa Rivero, at the helm of Rayo Vallecano. Eventually, he got to rebuild a new holding, Nueva Rumasa, which committed fraud in 2011, scamming millions of euros to small investors in a large-scale pyramid scheme.

Ruiz Mateos is thus portrayed throughout the series as an early case of viral phenomenon predating the popularization of social media.

== Production ==
Produced by RTVE in collaboration with Lavinia Audiovisual, the series was written by Àlex Solà and directed by Roger Gual. Besides footage from archives, the documentary features interviews to close acquaintances and collaborators of Ruiz Mateos, journalists, and victims of his scams, as well as politicians such as government spokesperson Eduardo Sotillos or minister Carlos Solchaga.

The musical score include songs by Ladilla Rusa, Los Punsetes and Astrud.

== Release ==
The full docuseries was released on RTVE Play on 27 October 2021.
