= Teresa Rivero =

Spanish businesswoman (born 1935)

María Teresa Rivero de Sánchez-Romate, dowager marquess of Olivara (born 19 May 1935), is a Spanish businesswoman. She was the president of Rayo Vallecano from 1994 to 2011, succeeding her husband José María Ruiz-Mateos, and was the first woman to be a president of a La Liga football club. The club's Vallecas Stadium was named after her from 2004 to the club's sale to Raúl Martín Presa in 2011.

== Biography ==
=== Early life and family ===
Rivero was born in Jerez de la Frontera as the youngest of eight children in a wealthy family. Her father was a lawyer, and her mother wished to raise her daughters to be housewives like her. Against her family's wishes, Rivero moved to Madrid at age 21 to study medicine. She studied at the house of a friend, whose brother José María Ruiz-Mateos began a relationship with her.

After two years of dating, Rivero married Ruiz-Mateos, who was also originally from Andalusia. The couple had seven daughters whom they raised to be housewives, and six sons trained to inherit the business interests of their father. The six sons were convicted of fraud and misappropriation of funds relating to the purchase of hotels.

=== Presidency of Rayo Vallecano ===
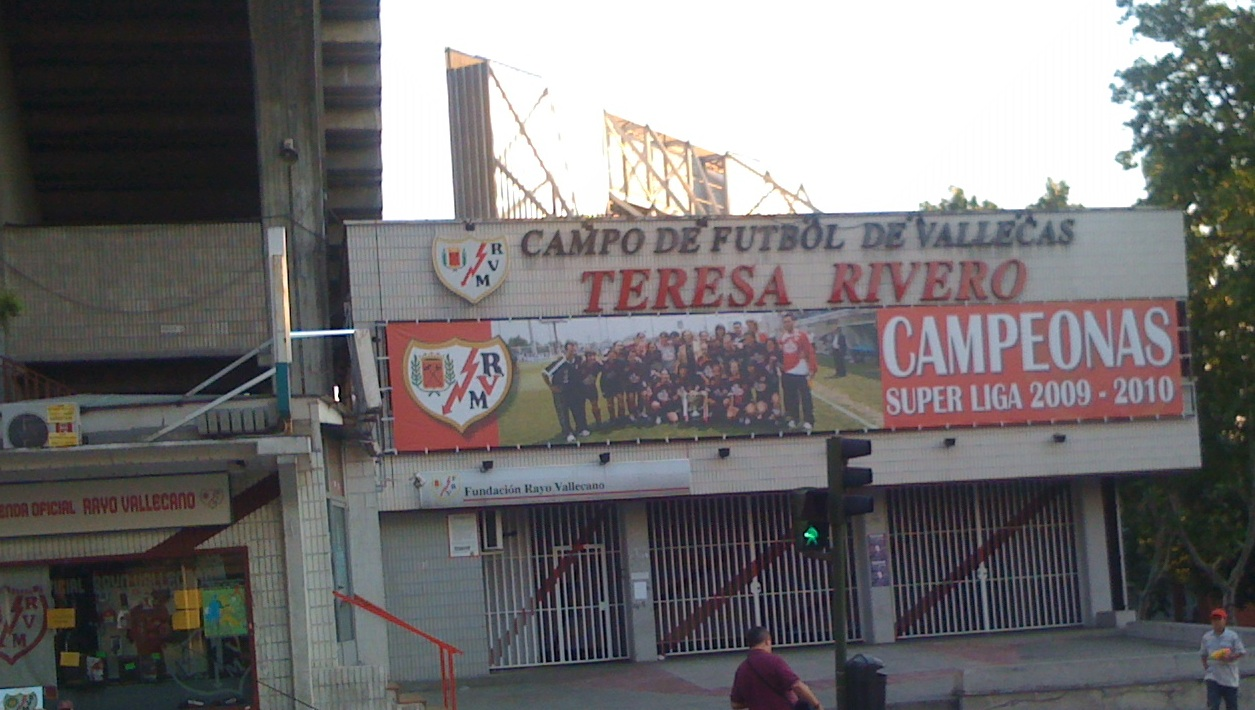
Entrance to the Vallecas Stadium showing the name of Teresa Rivero and marking the Rayo Vallecano women's team's 2008–09 league success.

On 12 January 1994, Ruiz-Mateos, as majority shareholder in Rayo Vallecano, named Rivero as his successor as club president. She became the first woman to preside over a La Liga club. Rivero said at her appointment that she did not know about nor care about football, a statement she would later repeat in court as defence against tax fraud charges from her presidency. During her presidency, the club led the league for four matchdays in 1999–2000 and qualified for the UEFA Cup in 2000–01, losing in the quarter-finals to compatriots Deportivo Alavés.

In 2002, Rivero signed Brazilian Milene Domingues, known as "Ronaldinha" for her relationship with Brazilian footballer Ronaldo who had moved to the Spanish capital to play for Real Madrid. The Royal Spanish Football Federation (RFEF) rules at the time prohibited foreign women from playing competitive games, but Domingues was signed to promote the club and other Ruiz-Mateos assets such as Dhul puddings. Rivero introduced Domingues by saying that she would "breed like a rabbit" like her and have twelve children, as she already had one.

Rayo Vallecano's Vallecas Stadium was renamed after Rivero in 2004, remaining that way until the sale of the club from Ruiz-Mateos to Raúl Martín Presa in May 2011. In February, the club had been one of ten Ruiz-Mateos companies to enter bankruptcy proceedings.

In September 2018, Rivero was sentenced to seven years in prison and a fine of €17 million for tax fraud committed as president of Rayo Vallecano between 2009 and 2010.

The Ruiz-Mateos and Rivero era at Rayo Vallecano is documented in the 2021 RTVE series Ruiz-Mateos, el primer fenómeno viral.
