= Naval Computer and Telecommunications Area Master Station Atlantic, Detachment Rota, Spain =

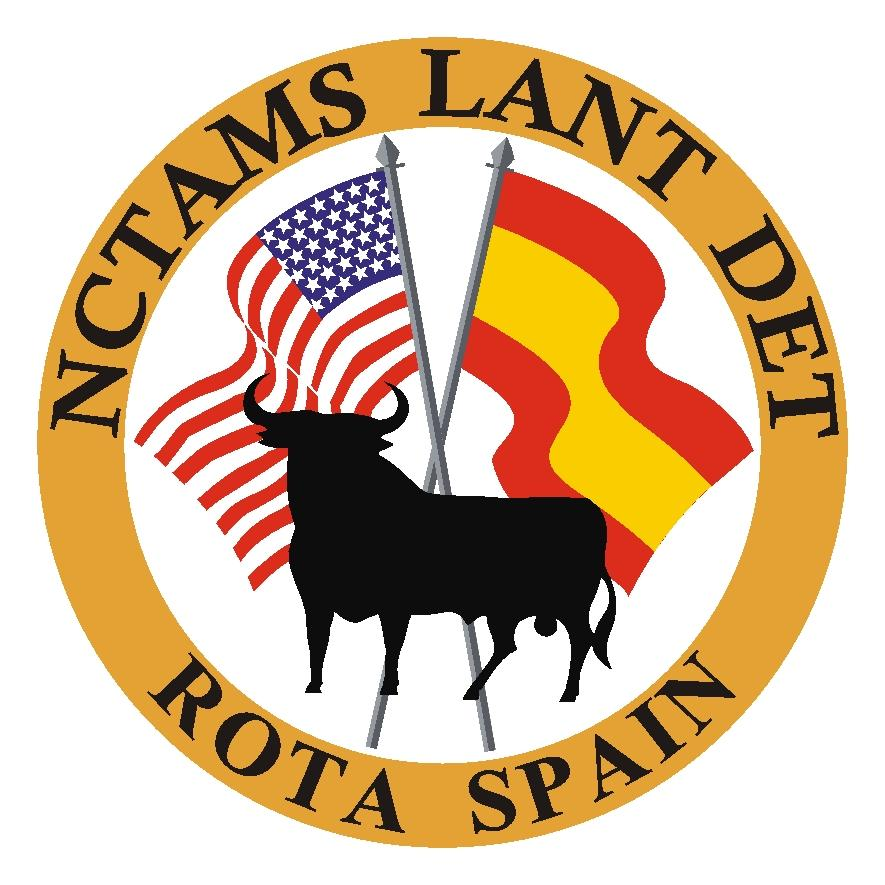
- Detachment Crest
- Active: 31 May 1963 to present
- Country: United States of America
- Branch: United States Navy
- Type: Shore
- Role: Communications Support
- Size: 110
- Nickname: NCTAMS LANT Det Rota
- Mottos: Command for People, People for Mission

Commanders
- Officer in Charge (OIC): Chief Warrant Officer 5 Veronica Hanna

== Mission ==
To provide responsive, resilient, and secure computer and telecommunications services enabling information superiority for U.S. Naval Station (NAVSTA) Rota, Spain, its tenant commands, and other U.S. and coalition forces within the Iberian Peninsula as directed.

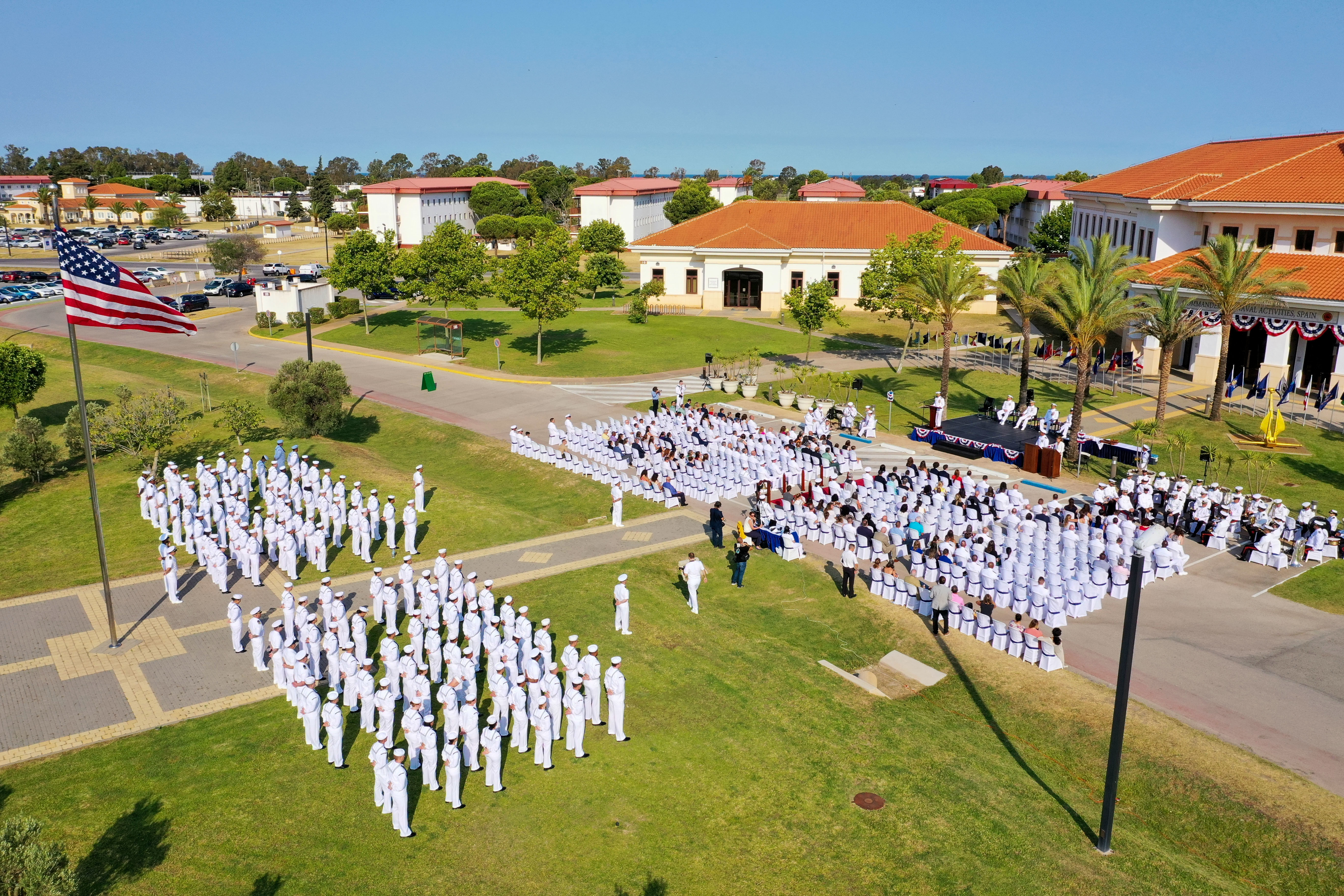
naval station Rota, Spain (July 14, 2022) Sailors assigned stand in formation during a change of command ceremony where Capt. Teague Suarez relieved Capt. David Baird as commander.

== History ==
Construction of what was then called “Naval Communications Station Spain” began on 19 December 1961 on the Spanish Naval base in Rota, Spain. The communications station became fully operational on 31 May 1963 and was subject to several reorganizations and name changes over the years to include:

7 October 1991 - Name changed to “Naval Computer and Telecommunications Station Spain (NCTS Spain)” to reflect the increased use of computers and telecommunications to carry out its mission.

1 October 1993 – Organization was downgraded from a Command to a Detachment, reporting directly to Naval Computer and Telecommunications Area Master Station Mediterranean (NCTAMS MED) in Naples, Italy as a result of region-wide U.S. military reorganizations following the end of the Cold War. This also resulted in a name change to “Naval Computer and Telecommunications Area Master Station Mediterranean, Detachment Rota, Spain (NCTAMS MED Det Rota)”.

1 October 1997 - Changed name to “Naval Computer and Telecommunications Area Master Station Europe and Central, Detachment Rota, Spain (NCTAMS EURCENT Det Rota)” to reflect the broader area of responsibility for the regional command in Naples that then included Europe and Southwest Asia (aka Central).

1 December 2004 – Navy-wide reorganization of communications stations resulted in NCTAMS EURCENT in Naples being downgraded to an O-5 command with regional responsibility and authority for Europe and Southwest Asia shifting to Naval Computer and Telecommunications Area Master Station Atlantic (NCTAMS LANT or NCTL) in Norfolk, VA. Subsequently, the communications station in Rota renamed to “Naval Computer and Telecommunications Area Master Station Atlantic, Detachment Rota, Spain (NCTAMS LANT Det Rota or NCTL Det Rota)”.

1 October 2015 – Operational Control (OPCON) of NCTL Det Rota was shifted from NCTL HQ in Norfolk, VA to Naval Computer and Telecommunications Station Naples, Italy (NCTS Naples), which was once again an O-6 Command. Administrative Control (ADCON) remained with NCTL HQ.

14 July 2022 – Capt. Teague J. Suarez relieved Capt. David S. Baird as commander, U.S. Naval Activities Spain and commanding officer of Naval Station Rota during a change of command ceremony in front of the installations headquarters.

== Awards ==
Operational Support for Communications in the Atlantic Region (OSCAR) Award recipient for years 2006, 2008, 2010, 2011, 2012 (award program ceased in 2013)

DISA EUR Facility of the Year Award for: 1. CAT II DISN Transmission Facility for 2010, 2011, 2014 2. CAT V DSN End Office Telephone Switch for 1994, 1995, 1996, 2000 (runner up), 2011 (runner up), 2014 (runner up) 3. CAT IX DSCS SATCOM for 1999, 2003 (runner up), 2007 (runner up), 2008, 2010 (runner up). NOTE: SATCOM mission disestablished 2010/2011.

Enlisted Information Dominance Warfare Specialist (EIDWS) Pennant in 2014

“Golden Anchor” Retention Excellence Award for 2015
