= Caturla =

Caturla is a surname. Notable people with the surname include:

- Alejandro García Caturla (1906–1940), Cuban composer
- Antonio Vidal Caturla (1923–1999), Spanish footballer
- Eduardo Caturla (born 1953), Spanish football manager
- Manuel Torres Caturla (born 1989), Spanish footballer
- María Luisa Caturla (1888–1984), Spanish art historian
- Teté Caturla (1937–2023), Cuban singer
