= Ruiz-Mateos Group =

Party of Labor and Employment–Ruiz-Mateos Group Partido del Trabajo y Empleo-Agrupación Ruiz-Mateos
- Leader: José María Ruiz-Mateos
- Secretary-General: Carmen Lovelle Alen
- Founded: 1989
- Dissolved: 1995
- Headquarters: C/ Velázquez, 19 - 4. D, Madrid
- Ideology: Right-wing populism
- Political position: Right-wing

The Party of Labor and Employment–Ruiz-Mateos Group (Spanish: Partido del Trabajo y Empleo–Agrupación Ruiz-Mateos), better known as Ruiz-Mateos Group (Spanish: Agrupación Ruiz-Mateos), was a Spanish political party founded by businessman José María Ruiz-Mateos following the collapse and expropriation of his Rumasa holding company. It was enrolled in the register of political parties with the Spanish Ministry of the Interior on August 30, 1989.

The leaders of the party were Ruiz-Mateos, his son in law Carlos Perrau of Pinninck (vice president) and Carmen Lovelle Alen (general secretary).

== History ==
In February 1983, the government of Spain ordered the expropriation of the Rumasa group of companies led by José María Ruiz-Mateos, for unpaid social security taxes and accounting irregularities. Ruiz-Mateos was convicted of mismanagement of corporate finances, and started a long legal battle with the Spanish state and the then Minister of Economy, Miguel Boyer, to try to reclaim his companies and obtain compensation.

Ruiz-Mateos entered politics to get the Rumasa case tried before the Supreme Court. On March 21, 1986, he founded the Social Action party (Acción Social), publicly presented on May 7, 1987, as a candidate of which he ran for a seat in the European Parliament elections of 1987. He got only 116,761 votes, not enough to win a seat.

Two years later, Ruiz-Mateos was nominated to run in the European Parliament elections of 1989 as a candidate of the "Ruiz-Mateos Group", a political party he created with a center-right populist platform opposed to the socialist government of Felipe González. A month before the election, the businessman had assaulted Miguel Boyer in the corridors of a courthouse, and he consequently conducted his entire electoral campaign under a warrant of arrest. In the final tally, Ruiz-Mateos Group placed sixth, accruing 608,000 votes and 2 MEPs: Ruiz-Mateos himself and his son-in-law, Carlos Perreau de Pinninck. Thanks to that seat, Ruiz-Mateos achieved his goal of judicial immunity. He also took his case to the Supreme Court of Spain, which ruled against him in 1991.

During his five years as an MEP, Ruiz-Mateos served as vice president of the European Democratic Alliance (EDA-RDE) and delegate for relations with Switzerland.

Following ts success in the EU elections, the Ruiz-Mateos Group was registered as a political party in Spain on August 30, 1989 and Ruiz-Mateos ran for election to the Congress of Deputies in the Spanish general election of 1989. He won no seat, however, and the party gained no representation in the municipal elections of 1991 or the 1993 general election. In 1994 the party was outside the European Parliament, and in 1995 Ruiz-Mateos dropped out of the municipal elections, according to the candidate himself, "to not subtract votes" from the People's Party. While it has fielded no candidates since then, the party is still registered as a political party with the Ministry of the Interior.
