= Milene Domingues =

Brazilian footballer

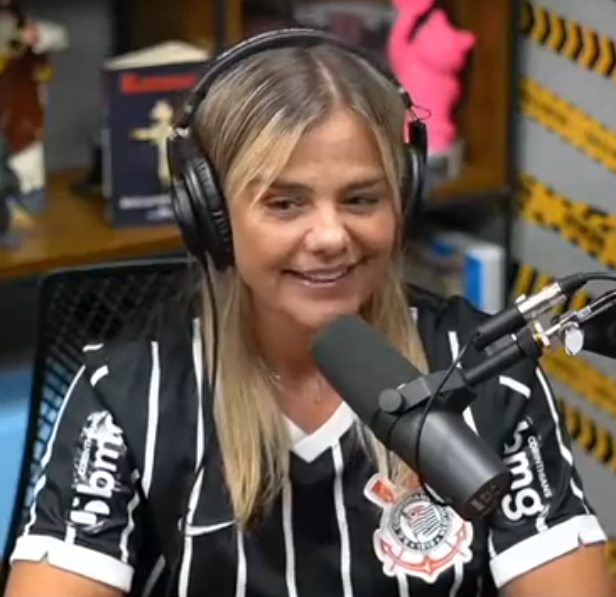
- In a 2021 interview

Personal information
- Full name: Milene Domingues Aganzo
- Date of birth: 18 June 1979 (age 47)
- Place of birth: São Paulo, Brazil
- Height: 1.67 m (5 ft 6 in)
- Position: Midfielder

Senior career*
Years	Team	Apps	(Gls)
1994–2001	SC Corinthians		
2001–2002	ASD Fiammamonza		
2002–2004	Rayo Vallecano		
2004–2007	AD Torrejón CF		
2007–2009	CF Pozuelo		

International career
2004	Brazil		
- * Club domestic league appearances and goals

Milene Domingues Aganzo (born 18 June 1979), also known as Mika, is a Brazilian former footballer who played as a midfielder.

== Career ==
Born in São Paulo, Domingues played in a promotional futsal team of models run by the Flash Book modeling agency. In 1994 this team formed the basis of a new SC Corinthians women's team. She finished her playing career with CF Pozuelo de Alarcón. The ex-model holds the women's record for ball juggling.

In September 2002, Domingues transferred from ASD Fiammamonza of Italy's Serie A to Rayo Vallecano in Spain's Superliga. The transfer was for £200,000, a record in Spanish women's football. The rules in Spain at the time did not permit foreign women to play competitive matches, and Rayo club president Teresa Rivero admitted that the transfer was for promoting the club and Dhul puddings, also owned by her husband José María Ruiz-Mateos.

At international level she was included in the Brazil women's national football team for the 2003 FIFA Women's World Cup. Her inclusion was somewhat surprising and coach Paulo Gonçalves emphasised that she was not a first choice: "Milene is going with us, but she is between the 19th and 20th player." Despite Milene's poor physical conditioning, Brazil's selectors felt she would attract interest from the media and public. She remained an unused substitute in all four matches as Brazil were eliminated in the quarter finals.

She did participate in Brazil's next match in April 2004, under their new coach René Simões, an unofficial friendly against Texas A&M Aggies women's soccer at Aggie Soccer Stadium.

== Personal life ==
She is a devout Buddhist and active member of Soka Gakkai International. She was married to football star Ronaldo from April 1999 to September 2003. Together they have one son, Ronald. Due to her marriage to Ronaldo, some fans nicknamed her Ronaldinha, but she has opposed this and prefers to be called Milene or Mika.
