= Raúl Martín Presa =

Spanish businessman (born 1977)

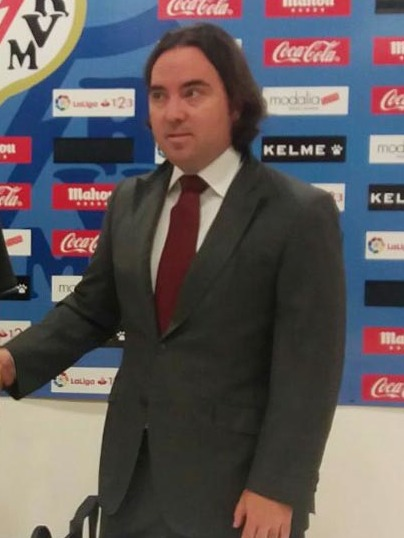
Martín Presa in 2017

Raúl Santiago Martín Presa (born 1977) is a Spanish businessman. He has been president of Rayo Vallecano since 2011.

Martín Presa bought Rayo Vallecano from José María Ruiz-Mateos and succeeded the latter's wife Teresa Rivero as club president. During his tenure, the club has won promotion three times to La Liga, and has been relegated twice. The club reached the Copa del Rey semi-final in 2022 and reached the UEFA Conference League final in 2026. His club was also the first from Spain to own an American franchise, with Rayo OKC competing in one season of the North American Soccer League before folding in 2016.

During his ownership of Rayo Vallecano, Martín Presa has had difficult relations with fans and players. Tensions have existed for economic, personal and political reasons.

== Early life ==
Born in Madrid, Martín Presa's father and uncle were both footballers, the former with Atlético Madrid. He graduated from business courses at ICADE and the Charles III University of Madrid. As of May 2011, he was a board member of at least nine companies in the Community of Madrid and Seville, and held eight patents for automated advertising displays.

== Career ==
=== Takeover of Rayo Vallecano (2011) ===
In May 2011, he completed a takeover of Rayo Vallecano, the club he supported and had been a member of for over a decade; he bought 98.6% of the shares from José María Ruiz-Mateos, whose wife Teresa Rivero was the club president. Sources have estimated he paid between €500 and €1,000 for the club, who were valued at between €50 million and €70 million but affected by debt. The club voluntarily entered bankruptcy proceedings weeks later, with Martín Presa calling the decision a legal obligation; it left the proceedings in November 2013.

Rayo were relegated at the end of the 2015–16 La Liga season. In March 2019, Martín Presa publicly attacked former sporting director Felipe Miñambres for leaving in the aftermath, and an unnamed defender for allegedly throwing a crucial match against Granada CF.

In September 2016, in a television discussion, Martín Presa said that the situation with recently fired Villarreal CF manager Marcelino García Toral was like that of the murder-suicide pilot of Germanwings Flight 9525, in that the company was not responsible for the actions of the employee. García Toral interpreted the statement as comparing him directly to the pilot, and said he would sue if Martín Presa did not retract. Martín Presa apologised and said his statement was misinterpreted.

=== Ownership of Rayo OKC (2016) ===
During Martín Presa's presidency, Rayo Vallecano became the first Spanish team to become majority owners of a professional American team; Rayo OKC from Oklahoma City in the North American Soccer League had a name, kit and logo based on the Vallecas-based side. The decision to buy an American franchise was considered unusual due to Rayo Vallecano's small budget.

In August 2016, halfway through the American team's debut season, the club replaced its head coach despite being one point off top spot and cut employee salaries; this was interpreted as an action due to Rayo Vallecano's relegation from La Liga. The team travelled by bus despite its nearest rival being 12 hours away, and a minority shareholder removed the turf that he had bought himself, as he feared the administration would sell it. Martín Presa administered the team despite being in the United States on a tourist visa, and not a work permit. In 2019, Rayo Vallecano's shareholders sued Martín Presa over alleged mismanagement of the American franchise.

=== Tensions with supporters (2019–present) ===
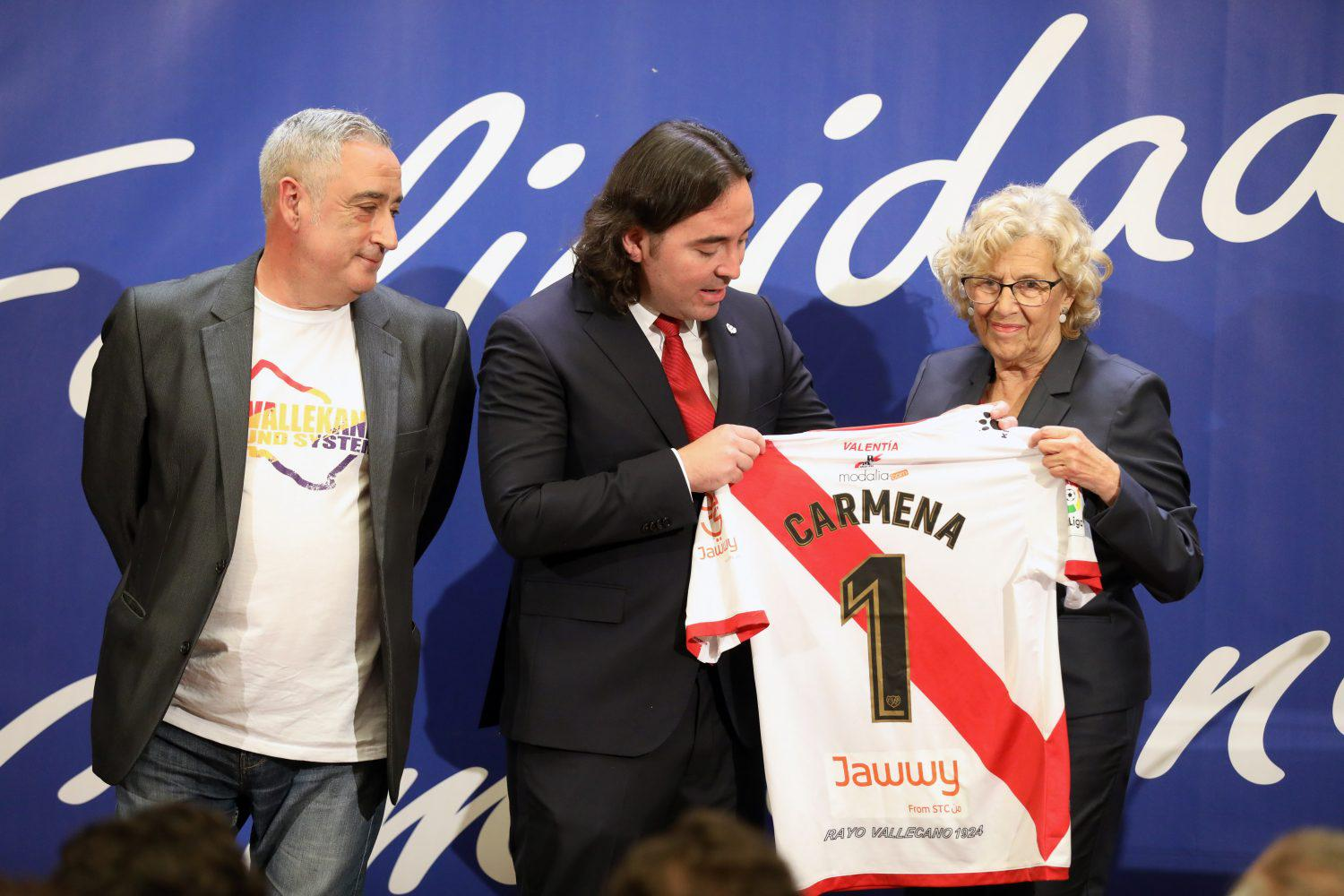
Vallecas councillor Paco Pérez, Martín Presa and Mayor of Madrid Manuela Carmena mark Rayo Vallecano's promotion to La Liga in 2018

Rayo won promotion as champions of the 2017–18 Segunda División, but were instantly relegated. In August 2019, death threats were painted on the stadium by fans unhappy with increased membership fees for the upcoming second-tier season.

Martín Presa has had a strained relationship with the Bukaneros, the left-wing ultra group of Rayo supporters. He initially paid for their away travel, but withdrew the offer, and has repeatedly faced calls from them for his resignation. In May 2020, his side refused to train for the resumption of professional football after the COVID-19 shutdown, due to breakdown in relationship with him for reasons including pay cuts.

In 2022, Martín Presa defended the hiring of Carlos Santiso as Rayo Vallecano Femenino manager after the coach had made telephone calls encouraging gang rape; Martín Presa said "We sign professionals, not people here". In April 2021, Martín Presa invited Vox leader Santiago Abascal and the party's Community of Madrid leader Rocío Monasterio to watch Rayo in the executive box at the Campo de Fútbol de Vallecas; the decision was opposed by fans. In March 2022, Vox's spokesman in the Assembly of Madrid defended Martín Presa from criticism by the Bukaneros. Diario AS columnist Alfredo Relaño described Rayo as a "divided team" that year for the tension between president and supporters, despite being in the Copa del Rey semi-finals for the first time in 40 years.

When negotiating for the transfer of the forward Raúl de Tomás in September 2022, an incident occurred between the player's representatives and Martín Presa. The representatives called the police, alleging assault, while Martín Presa made his own complaint of the same offence against the representatives.

National newspaper El Mundo commented on Rayo's centenary in May 2024 that issues around Martín Presa were overshadowing the celebration. Fans were protesting against his plans to move to a new stadium, which he said was due to the current stadium being unsatisfactory and it being cheaper to relocate than to renovate. Midfielder Óscar Trejo had resigned as captain the previous October alleging poor treatment of players and other employees, and Martín Presa was also accused by fans of failing to invest in the club's women's team, which had endured two consecutive relegations. The club finished 8th in the 2024–25 La Liga and qualified for the UEFA Conference League, the first European qualification for 25 years.
