= Francisco Luque =

Spanish sculptor (born 1948)

- Born: Francisco Luque Palma; 1948 (age 77–78); Santaella, Spain
- Known for: sculptor

Francisco Luque Palma (born 1948) is a Spanish sculptor.

== Biography ==
Born in 1948, at the beginning of the 70s he starts his studies at the School of Applied Arts in Cordoba, Spain and starts participating in collective expositions in the region of Córdoba and Jaén. He is mostly autodidactic, splitting his time between teaching activities and artistic activities. In 1992, he joins a graphic work group for expanding his artistic techniques. Luque has a long and broad expositive trajectory and a full curriculum. Some of his works are part of the permanent collection of important art galleries and museums in Madrid, Valencia, Sevilla, A Coruña, Murcia, Pamplona and Córdoba. His work can be seen regularly in both collective and personal expositions and in the permanent collections of important art galleries and museums in Spain.

== Style ==
The sculpture style of Francisco Luque is based on a utopic ideal of human beauty where shapes are revealed through peculiar adoptions of the concepts of volume and space. His work usually talks about the nudity body or the female figure. His Venus are exuberant. It is possible to see in his works a strong disproportion in the elements, with solid and exuberant forms, that the artist develops imprinting in them a characteristic stamp and style with a very warm and tender spirit. According to some critics, this particular style is inspired in the new trends for esthetics with no or little relation to classical or academic models. Clearly influenced by the graphic work of Peter Paul Rubens, the sculptures of Francisco Luque represent women overflowing sensuality and carnality, transmitting warmth through the shape. The disproportion detected in his human figures, opposite to the canon of conventional beauty, puts him closer to Fernando Botero full of tenderness and serenity. In the sculptures of Francisco Luque, the close and defined painting stroke characteristic of Fernando Botero is transformed in smoothness and curves, which enclosed in themselves the female spirit, main motif of the artist.

== Work and recognition ==
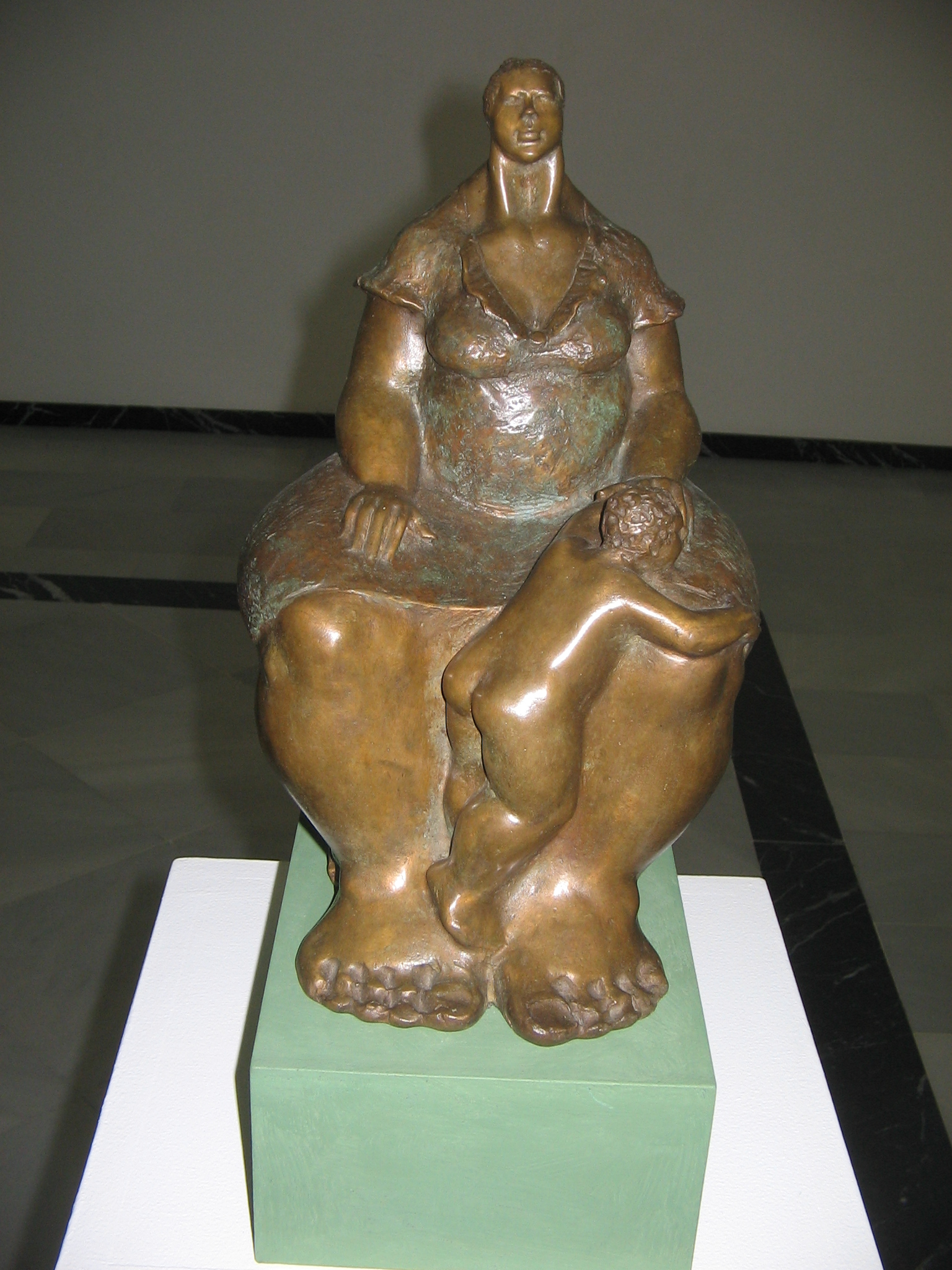
Motherhood

Francisco Luque's work has received a number of awards and recognitions (First Prize of the National of Painting and Sculpture of Valdepeñas; First Prize in Sculpture of the XXV Anniversary of the Arts Circle of Pozoblanco, Pozoblanco; Second Prize of Sculpture in the X International Contest of Villa de Rota, Rota; and Honorary Mention of the Sculpture Contest Club 63, Jaén; among others). His sculptures are part of the permanent exposition in the Museo Diocesano Bellas Artes of Córdoba, in the Museo Ruiz Mateos, Cadiz, in the National Library in Madrid and in the City Hall of Santaella among others. An example of his monumental work can be seen in the promenade of his hometown, Santaella.
