= Santaella =

- Municipality
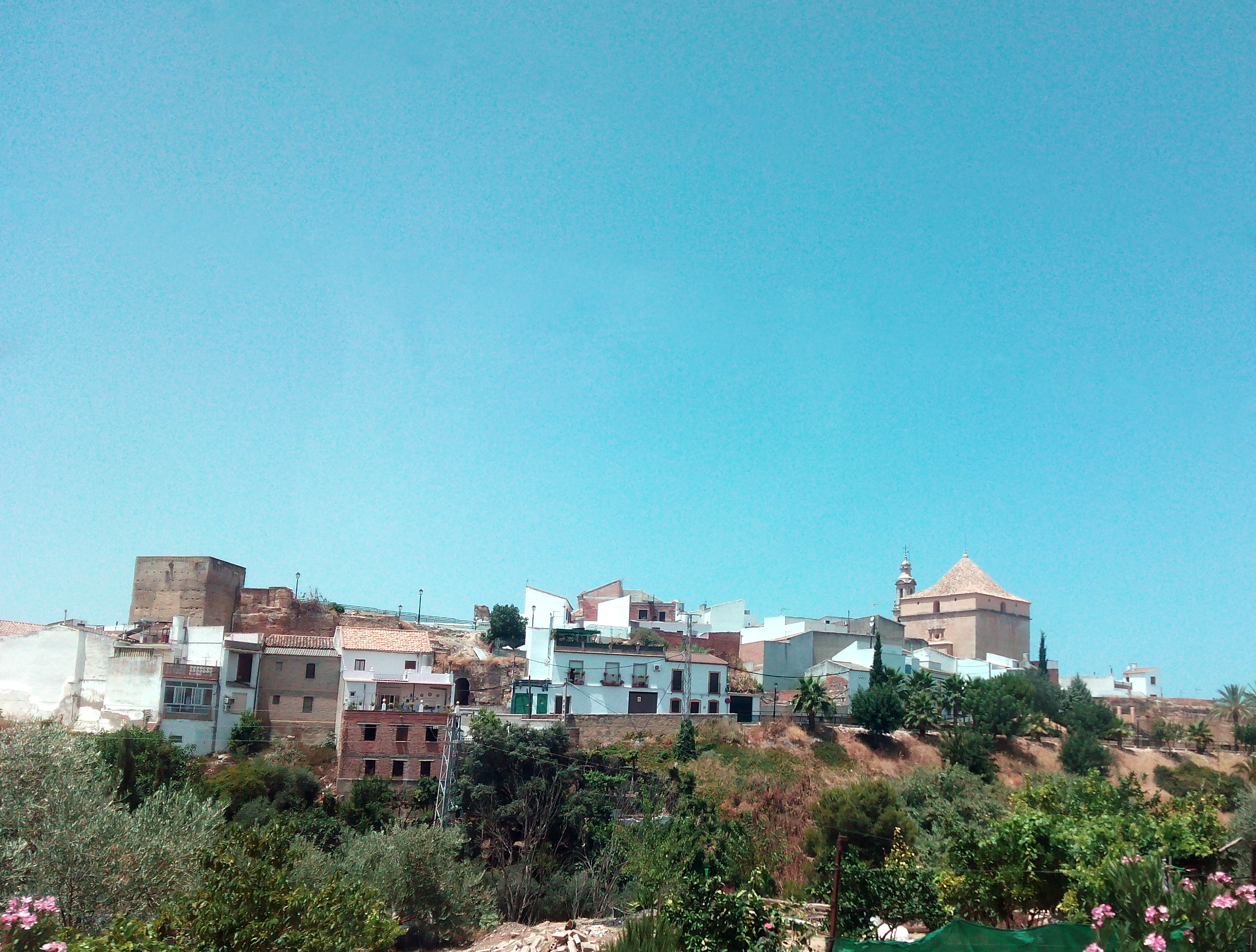
- View of Santaella

- Seal
- Interactive map of Santaella
- Coordinates: 38°34′N 4°50′W
- Country: Spain
- Province: Córdoba
- Municipality: Santaella

Area
  - Total: 272 km^{2} (105 sq mi)
- Elevation: 238 m (781 ft)

Population (2025-01-01)
  - Total: 4,641
  - Density: 17.1/km^{2} (44.2/sq mi)
- Time zone: UTC+1 (CET)
  - Summer (DST): UTC+2 (CEST)
- Website: www.santaella.es

Santaella is a municipality located in the province of Córdoba, Spain. According to the 2024 census (INE), the village has a population of 4655 inhabitants.

== History ==
The lands of Santaella have attracted men since its more remote times. Settlements in Santaella date from as early as around 150,000 BC. These settlements have been maintained uninterrupted to our days. Fertile countryside with good water supplies constituted the basis one where different towns and cultures arrive. Among other inhabitants, the pre-Roman natives, the Roman civilization, the barbaric towns and the Hispanic-Moslem world outstand as relevant in Santaella actual configuration. All of them left their traces in the actual city. It was re-conquered by the king Fernando III toward 1240. Then, Santaella was yielded to the Counsel of Cordoba by its son Alfonso X. Felipe II grants its jurisdictional independence, to pass, later, to be erected in marquisate, recovering its independence in 1735.

== Art and culture ==
Among others, the Arabian walls, the homage tower and the Asuncion Church from the 17th century stand out for their relevance and beauty. As part of its artistic development, many upcoming Spanish painters and sculptors are developing their work in Santaella, with the sculptor Francisco Luque as a known representative.

== See also ==
- List of municipalities in Córdoba
