= Eduardo Caturla =

Spanish football manager (born 1953)

Personal information
- Full name: Eduardo Caturla Vázquez
- Date of birth: 25 November 1953 (age 72)
- Place of birth: Madrid, Spain

Managerial career
- Years: Team
- 1980–1981: Parla
- 1982–1984: Pegaso
- 1984–1985: Rayo Vallecano
- 1985–1986: Calvo Sotelo
- 1986–1987: Atlético Madrid B
- 1987–1989: Getafe
- 1989: Salamanca
- 1990–1991: Valdepeñas
- 1991: Mérida
- 1992–1993: Valdepeñas
- 1994: Talavera
- 1994–1997: Carabanchel
- 1997–1998: Fuenlabrada
- 1998–1999: Alcalá
- 1999–2000: Cacereño
- 2001–2002: Santa Ana

Eduardo Caturla Vázquez (born 25 November 1953) is a Spanish former football manager. His managerial career, beginning in his late 20s, was mostly spent in the lower leagues, besides spells in the Segunda División with Salamanca (1989) and Mérida (1991).

== Career ==
Born in Madrid, Caturla was managing Pegaso before signing for Rayo Vallecano of Segunda División B in June 1984. He achieved promotion in his only season, but subsequently said that he wanted to remain as manager only if the new president could solve the club's financial issues.

Caturla moved in June 1985 to Calvo Sotelo, newly relegated to the third tier. A year later, with the club having gone down another division, he returned to the national capital and became manager of Atlético Madrileño, the reserve team of Atlético Madrid. In July 1987, he moved on to Getafe and was replaced by Iselín Santos Ovejero.

In March 1989 Caturla reached the Segunda División for the first time, signing for Salamanca for the rest of the season. The club from Castile and León paid compensation to Getafe for him to succeed José Luis García Traid. On his debut on 2 March, he won 2–0 at home to Figueres. He was sacked by the Charros at the end of October for not meeting the expectations of the board.

Caturla's only other spell in the second tier was for the first 11 games of 1991–92, in charge of Mérida. He was sacked in November, with the executive saying that it was to prevent his "suffering", and he was replaced by former Real Madrid player Juanito in his first managerial job. Caturla called the decision "unfair, hasty and even strange".

As president of the Royal Spanish Football Federation's Committee of Managers, Caturla spoke out against unlicenced managers, accusing them of "professional intrusion". In September 2018, he and former players Fernando Giner and Vicente Engonga were named delegates to the Spain national team.
