= Rumasa =

Spanish holding company

José María Ruiz-Mateos S.A
- Company type: Sociedad Anónima
- Founded: Pozuelo de Alarcón, Spain
- Founder: José María Ruiz-Mateos
- Fate: Liquidated
- Number of employees: 65,000 (1983)

José María Ruiz-Mateos Sociedad Anónima (Rumasa) was a holding company founded by Spanish entrepreneur José María Ruiz Mateos and expropriated by the Spanish government on February 23, 1983.

In 1982 Rumasa constituted 2% of the Spanish GDP. The 700 different businesses with 65000 employees forming the holding, from banks to hotels, were partitioned and reprivatizated.

Ruiz Mateos fled the country days after the expropriation and was later jailed in Spain. The expropriation was ruled constitutional by the Spanish Constitutional Court in 1986. Ruíz Mateos was acquitted by the Spanish Supreme Court in 1999, though he has never been compensated by the Spanish state.

Ruiz Mateos later founded "Nueva Rumasa" ("New Rumasa" ), which filed for bankruptcy in 2011 after issuing a series of highly controversial IOUs .

== Sponsorship ==
Between 1999 and 2005, Rumasa was the main kit sponsor of Spanish football club Rayo Vallecano.
