= Rota, Spain =

Rota
- Town
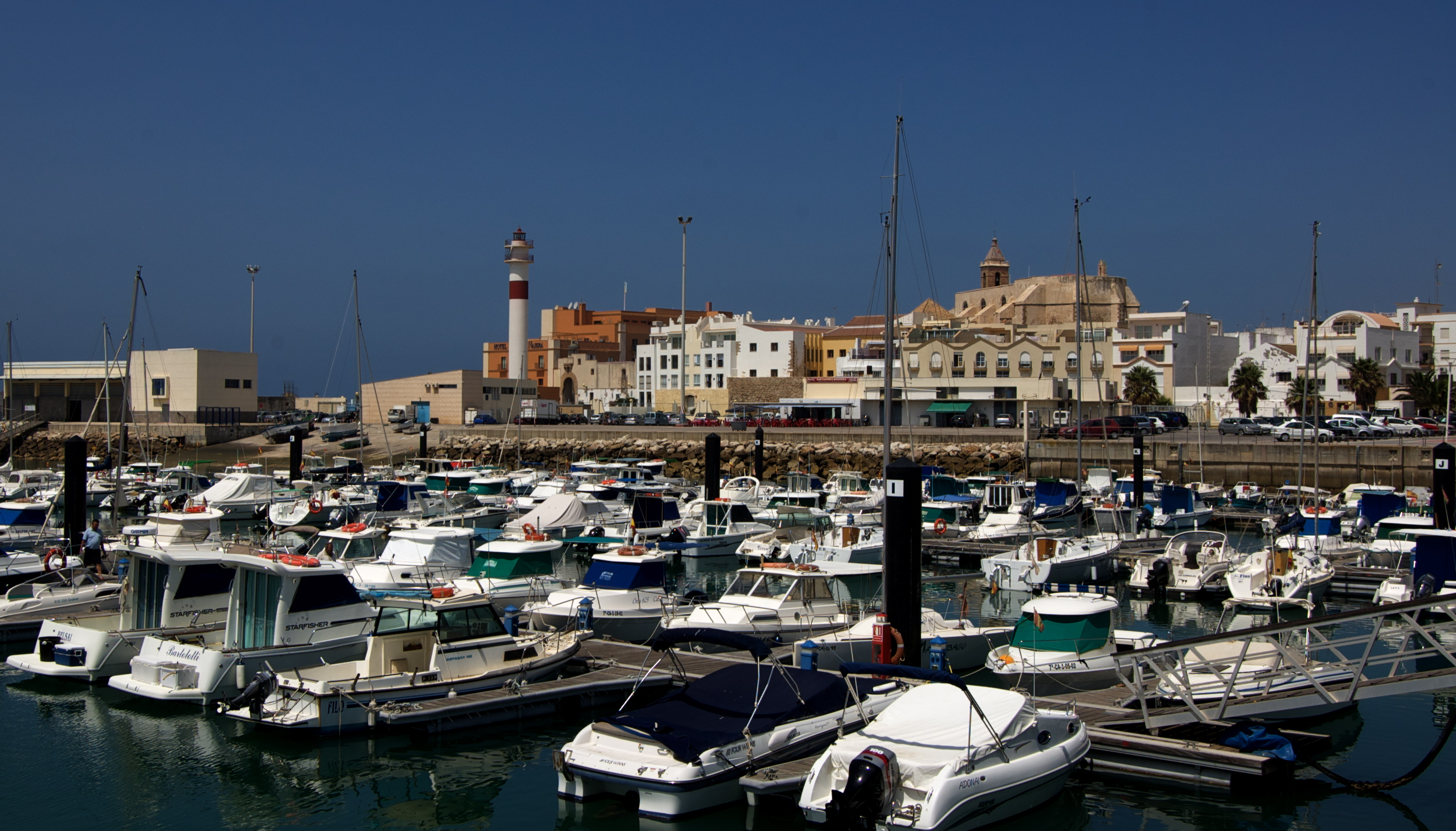
- Rota port

- Flag Coat of arms

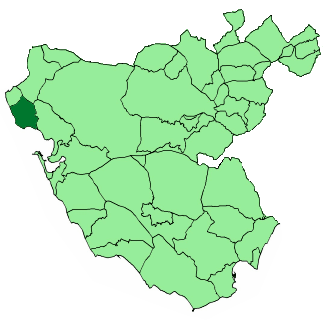
- Location of Rota

- Location in Andalusia
- Coordinates: 36°37′N 6°21′W
- Country: Spain
- Province: Cádiz

Government
  - Mayor: José Javier Ruiz Arana PSOE

Area
  - Total: 84 km^{2} (32 sq mi)
  - Land: 84 km^{2} (32 sq mi)
  - Water: 0.00 km^{2} (0 sq mi)

Population (2025-01-01)
  - Total: 29,289
  - Density: 350/km^{2} (900/sq mi)
- Demonym: Roteño
- Time zone: UTC+1 (CET)
  - Summer (DST): UTC+2 (CEST)
- Website: www.aytorota.es

Rota is a municipality and town in the Province of Cádiz, Andalusia, Spain. Its surface area is 84 km^{2} and is bordered by the towns of Chipiona, Sanlúcar de Barrameda and El Puerto de Santa María. It is located near the city of Jerez de la Frontera and is 36 kilometers away from the provincial capital, Cádiz. It had in the year 2009 28,516 inhabitants, with a density of 339 inhabitants / km^{2}. It belongs to two associations, the Association of Municipalities of Cádiz Bay along with the municipalities of Cádiz, Jerez de la Frontera, El Puerto de Santa María, San Fernando, Chiclana de la Frontera and Puerto Real; and the Association of Municipalities of the Lower Guadalquivir that comprises municipalities of Northwest Coast of Andalusia.

Located along the Bay of Cádiz in the Atlantic Ocean, it is halfway between Portugal and Gibraltar, is predominantly a tourist town, a vacation/holiday destination for travelers from all over Europe. During the low season, its main business activity is the fishing industry. In the municipality is located the Naval Station Rota, which is the largest source of employment to the municipality. It also served as a transoceanic abort landing site for the Space Shuttle program.

== History ==
Archaeological evidence suggests that there was a Bronze Age settlement on the present site of Rota. The current town was founded by the Phoenicians at approximately the same time as Cádiz. Rota is assumed to be the same city known as Astaroth of the Tartesian empire. It later passed to the Romans, who knew the town as Speculum Rotae.

Following the arrival of the Moors in Spain, the city became known as Rabita Rutta ("watchtower of Rota"), from which it derives its present name. In 1217, the city was raided by a group of Frisian Crusaders en route to the Holy Land. From 1248 onwards, the Moors were gradually expelled from Spain, and the city became Christian. In 1297, Sancho IV awarded the town to Alonso Pérez de Guzmán in honour of his defence of Tarifa. Later, Pérez de Guzmán gave it to his daughter, Isabel, as a wedding present when she married Fermin Ponce de León, Maestre of Alcántara and First Lord of Marchena. Construction of the Castillo de la Luna (Castle of the Moon) had begun in 1295, two years prior to the bequest to Pérez de Guzmán, as part of Sancho IV's effort to develop strong coastal defenses, especially near the entrance to the Mediterranean Sea. During the Middle Ages, the town was an important port for trading with North Africa. In 1780 the 11th Duke of Arcos died without issue, and the city was rendered to the Duke of Osuna.

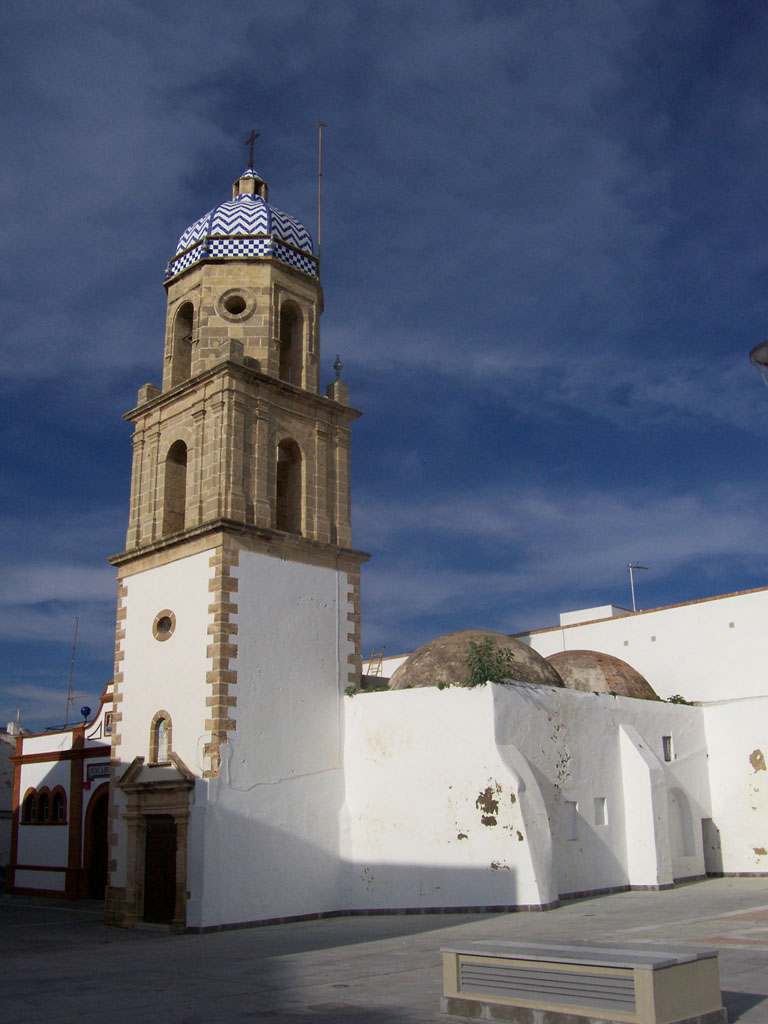
Tower of the Convent of La Merced

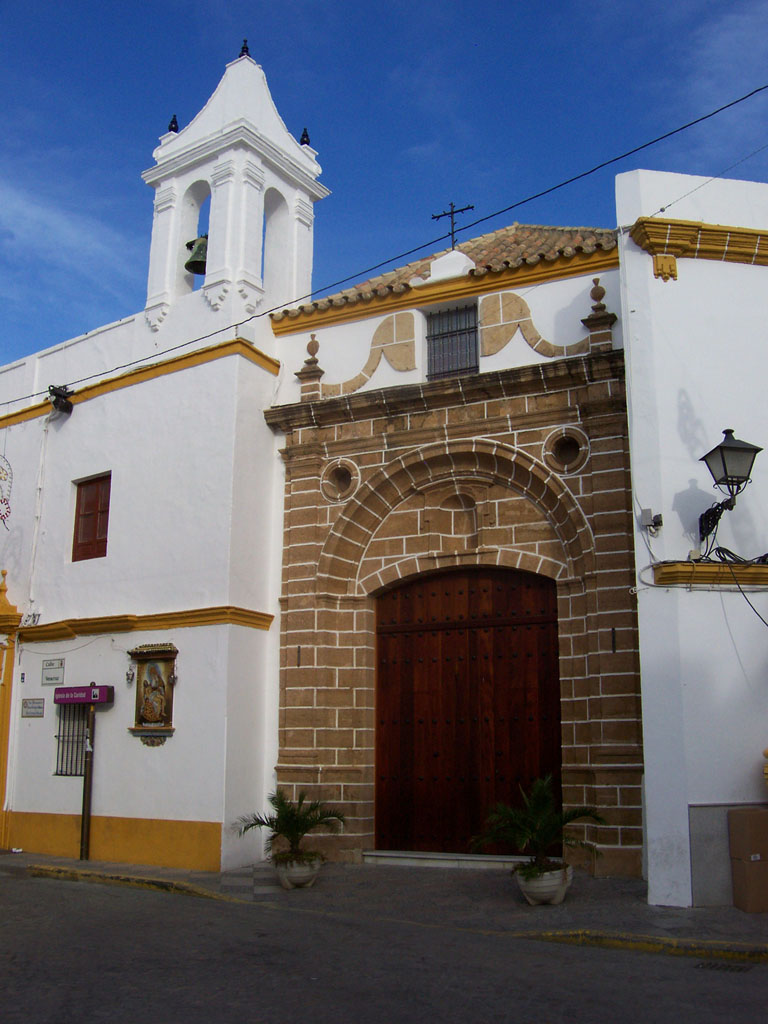
Capilla de la Caridad, Rota

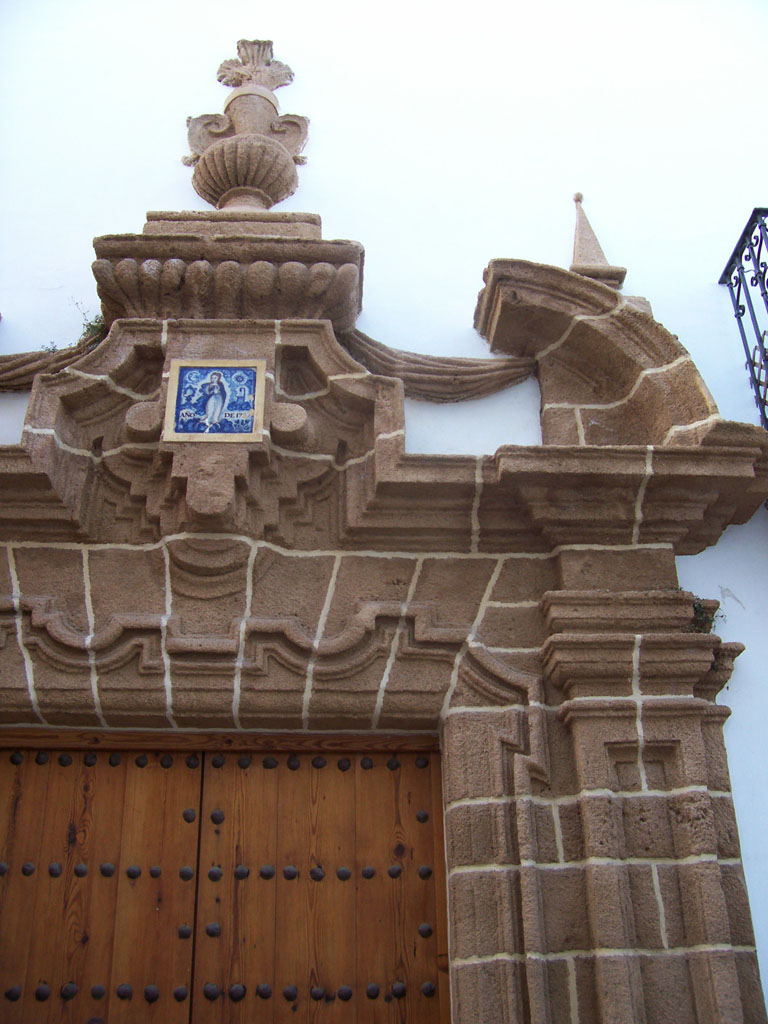
Piedra ostinera (shell limestone) cover

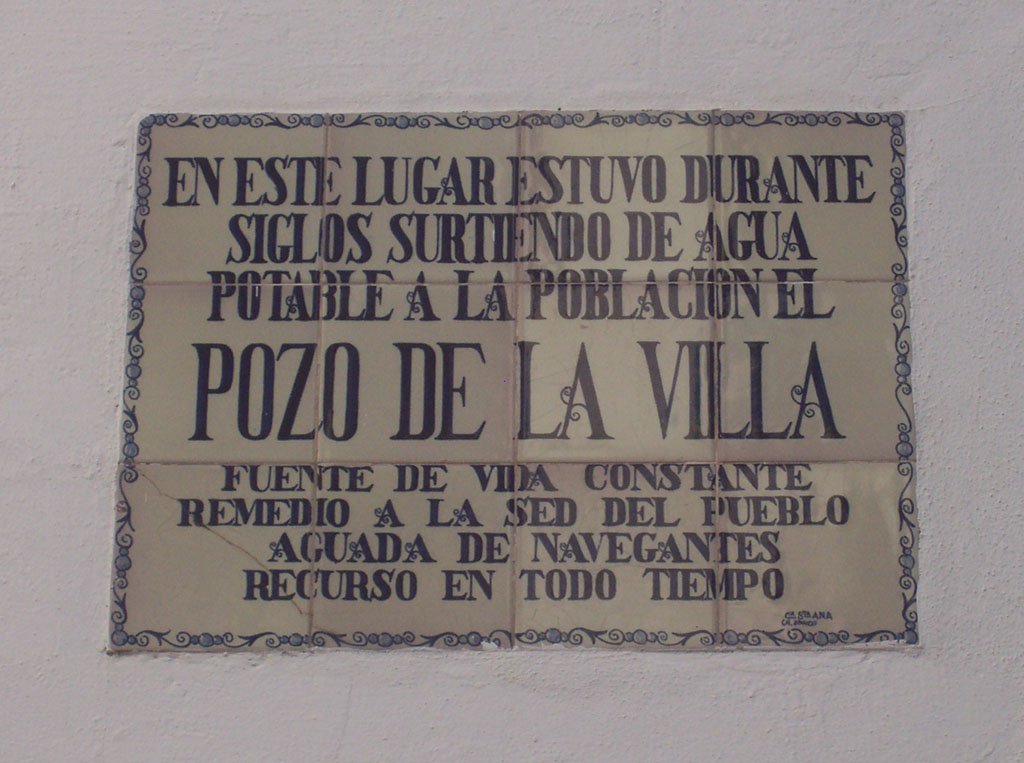
Tile of Pozo (well water) de la Villa

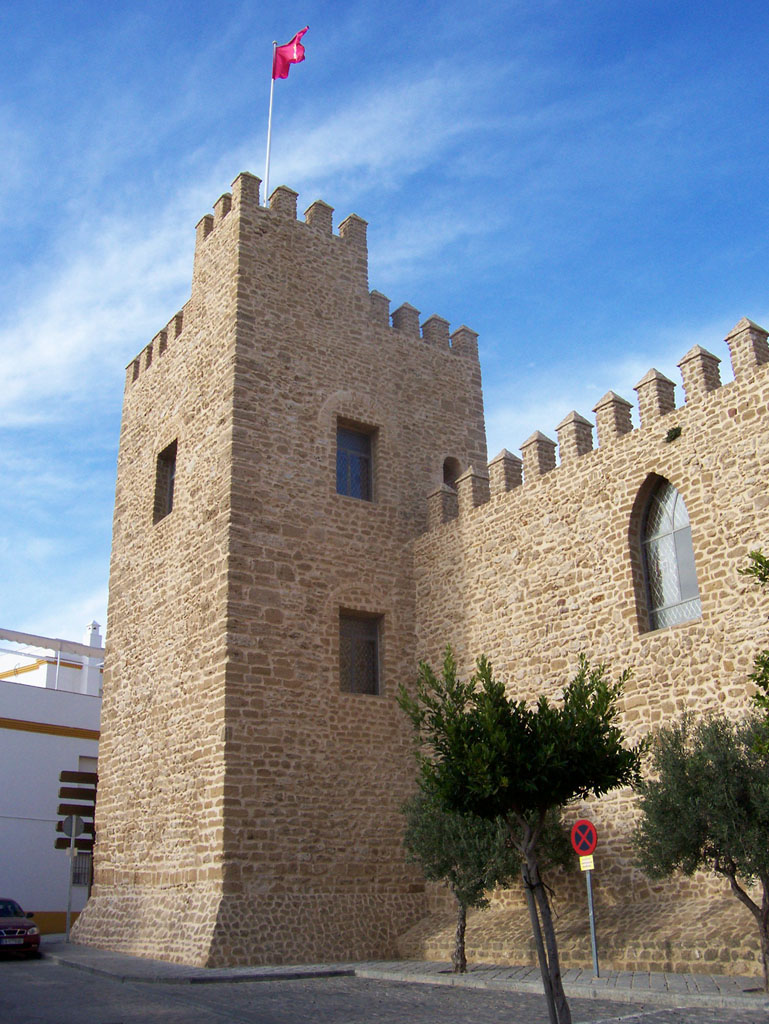
Castillo de la Luna

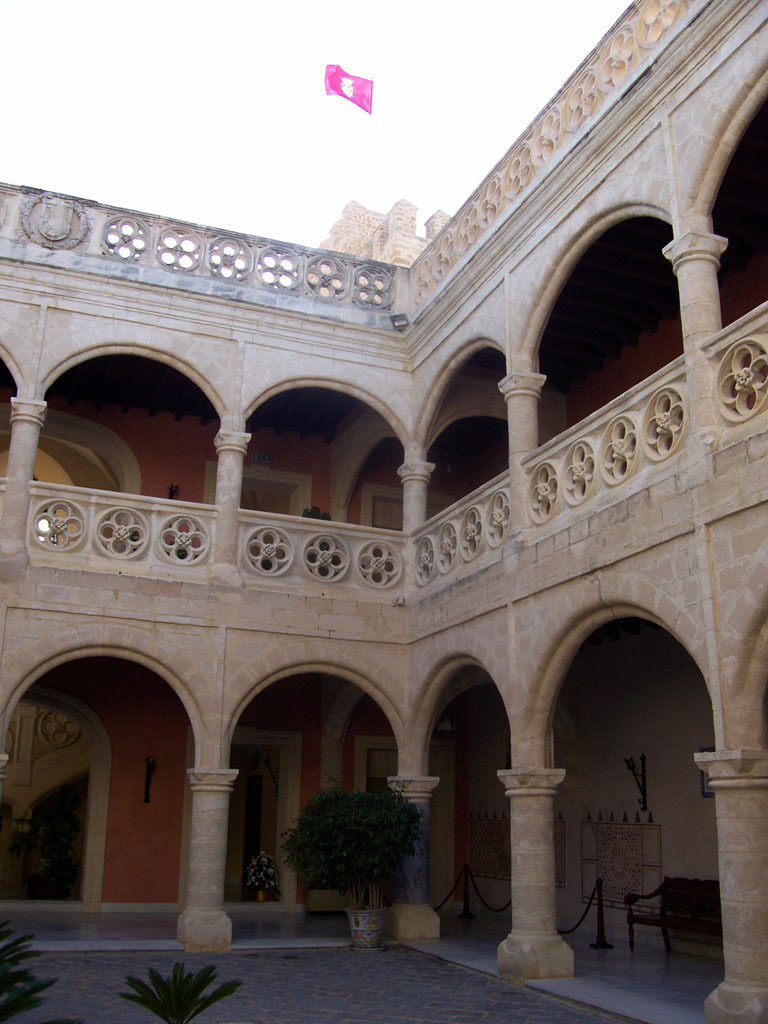
Castillo de la Luna

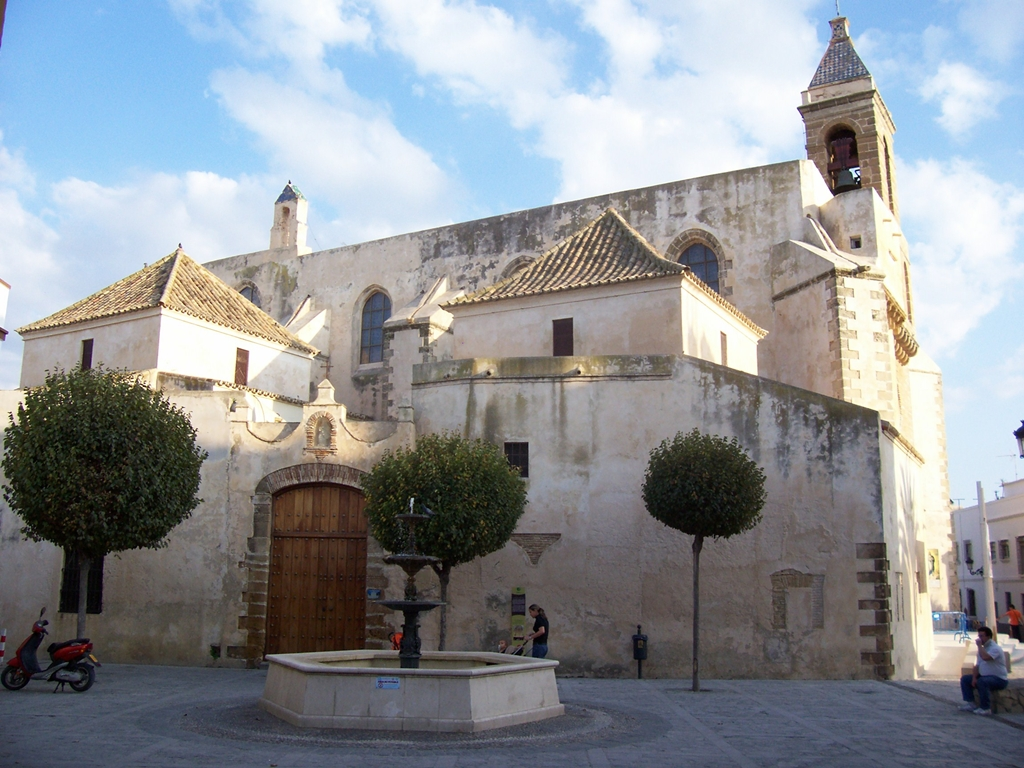
Parroquia de Nuestra Señora de la O

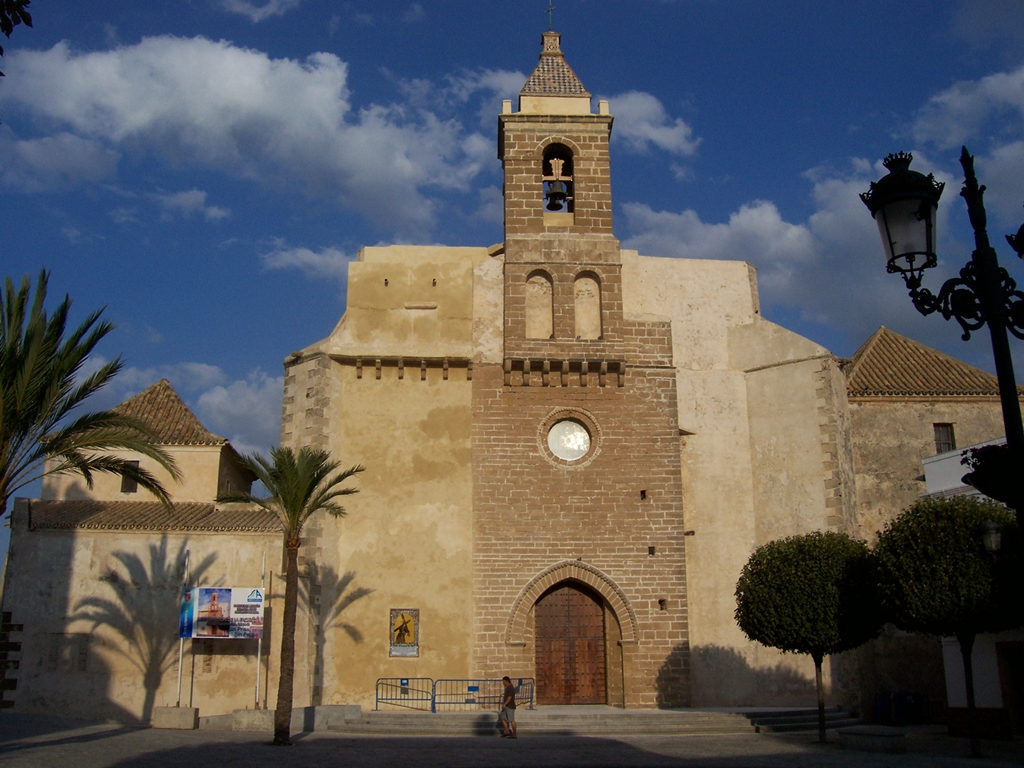
Parroquia de Nuestra Señora de la O

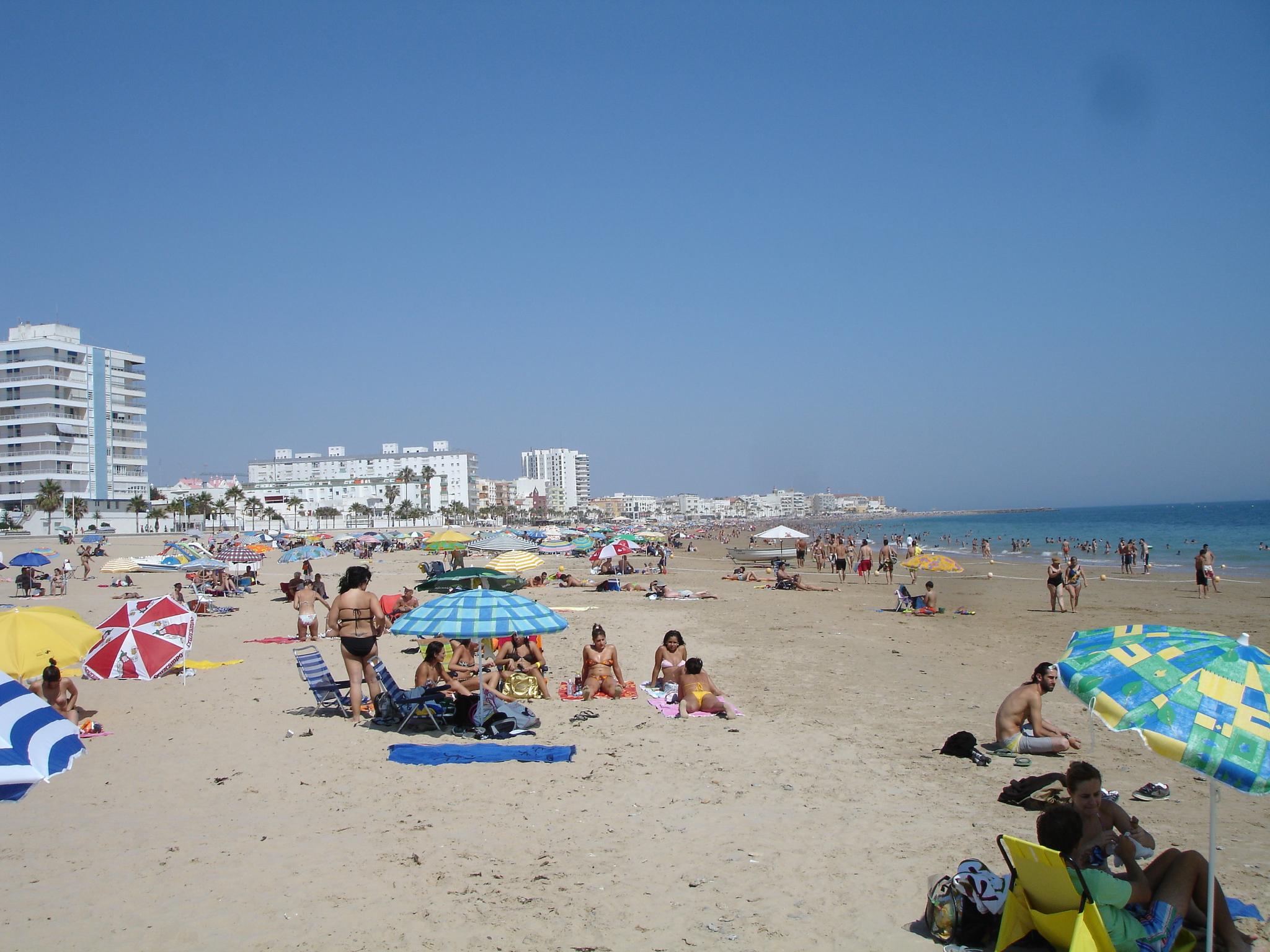
Beach

== Economy ==
Rota is primarily a resort town, offering eight hotels and nearly two thousand beds. It is a summer destination for tourists from all over Europe. During the off-season, its main commercial activity centres on the fishing industry.

Rota is also the location of the Rota naval base, a joint Spanish Navy and United States Navy base opened in 1955 which also hosts United States Marine Corps and United States Air Force units. It is also the usual first and last port of call for U.S. Navy vessels on their way to and from the Mediterranean Sea. The base once contributed up to 80 percent of Rota's economy directly or indirectly, but a significant decrease in the American presence since about 1995 and the city's modern infrastructure, which enables remaining employees at the base to commute easily from surrounding towns and cities has resulted in the base giving way to tourism as the leading source of revenue.

The surrounding area is used for agriculture. The predominant crops are cotton and sunflowers, as well as sweet green bell peppers, tomatoes, and pumpkins.

== Climate ==
Rota has a hot-summer mediterranean climate (Köppen Csa) with mild winters and hot summers. Rota has significant maritime influences from the Atlantic Ocean. The average temperature during the coldest month (January) is around 11 °C (52 °F) while the average temperature during the hottest month (August) is around 25 °C (77 °F). Rota is very sunny, as the annual sunshine hours are above 3,000h. The average sea temperature is around 16 °C (61 °F) during the winter and around 23 °C (73 °F) during the summer.

Climate data for Rota averages. Rota Base Naval 1991-2020 normals, 1988-2025 extremes, 21 metres (69 ft)
Month	Jan	Feb	Mar	Apr	May	Jun	Jul	Aug	Sep	Oct	Nov	Dec	Year
Record high °C (°F)	23.9 (75.0)	25.2 (77.4)	30.1 (86.2)	33.0 (91.4)	38.2 (100.8)	40.8 (105.4)	42.2 (108.0)	42.7 (108.9)	41.0 (105.8)	33.8 (92.8)	27.7 (81.9)	24.8 (76.6)	42.7 (108.9)
Mean daily maximum °C (°F)	16.2 (61.2)	17.4 (63.3)	19.7 (67.5)	21.5 (70.7)	24.6 (76.3)	27.8 (82.0)	30.4 (86.7)	30.7 (87.3)	28.0 (82.4)	24.7 (76.5)	19.9 (67.8)	17.0 (62.6)	23.2 (73.7)
Daily mean °C (°F)	11.4 (52.5)	12.4 (54.3)	14.7 (58.5)	16.5 (61.7)	19.5 (67.1)	22.7 (72.9)	24.9 (76.8)	25.3 (77.5)	22.9 (73.2)	19.7 (67.5)	15.1 (59.2)	12.5 (54.5)	18.1 (64.6)
Mean daily minimum °C (°F)	6.5 (43.7)	7.3 (45.1)	9.6 (49.3)	11.5 (52.7)	14.3 (57.7)	17.5 (63.5)	19.4 (66.9)	19.8 (67.6)	17.8 (64.0)	14.7 (58.5)	10.3 (50.5)	7.8 (46.0)	13.0 (55.5)
Record low °C (°F)	−4.7 (23.5)	−2.3 (27.9)	0.4 (32.7)	3.6 (38.5)	6.8 (44.2)	10.8 (51.4)	11.5 (52.7)	13.3 (55.9)	10.3 (50.5)	6.2 (43.2)	0.0 (32.0)	−1.6 (29.1)	−4.7 (23.5)
Average precipitation mm (inches)	66.9 (2.63)	51.4 (2.02)	57.5 (2.26)	45.6 (1.80)	31.3 (1.23)	4.7 (0.19)	0.5 (0.02)	2.0 (0.08)	26.0 (1.02)	80.6 (3.17)	87.5 (3.44)	81.1 (3.19)	535.1 (21.05)
Average precipitation days (≥ 1 mm)	6.2	5.6	6.4	5.7	3.2	0.7	0.2	0.3	2.3	6.1	6.9	7.1	50.7
Average relative humidity (%)	76.2	72.3	69.5	66.9	63.1	61.9	62	63.8	68.3	71.9	74.2	77.2	68.9
Mean monthly sunshine hours	177.2	191.6	238.4	266.6	323.8	351.1	375.4	343.8	271.7	228.5	181.5	162.5	3,112.1
Source 1: AEMET OpenData / AEMET
Source 2: NCEI

== Demographics ==
demographic vertical bar chart of Rota between 1842 and 2021
De jure census population, according to the INE.
De facto census population, according to the INE.

== Culinary ==
A traditional dish is the arranque made with chopped bread, tomatoes, green peppers, garlic, salt and olive oil. The local wine, known as tintilla, is made with dark, ripe grapes. It can be found in the numerous bodegas spread over the old town, one of them being El Gato which produces its own wine.

Spanish, Andalucian, Cádiz, and Rota gastronomic delights are many and varied. Most Spanish people enjoy dishes such as caracoles (snails), menudo (tripe soup), chicharrón (deep fried pork rinds), a variety of wines, and of course gazpacho (cold tomato soup taken as a drink).

== Arts ==
The Foundation Ruiz Mateos delivers a biannual award called Villa de Rota in the field of the plastic arts, music and literature. This constitutes nowadays an extensive art collection which is being shown in the Museum Ruiz Mateos since opened its doors on 4 February 2005. This museum gathers a total of 102 works composed of oil paintings, watercolors, engravings and sculptures, and includes all first prizes awarded in the course of the national contests "Villa de Rota" as well as individual donations received. Among other artists, Antonio Utrera, Francisco Luque and Dominika Grisgrabed have won the contest.

== Politics ==
Traditionally the town has four predominant parties: People's Party, Spanish Socialist Workers' Party, United Left, and the local Roteños Unidos (United Rotanians). While there are occasional independent parties, the only one to successfully enter the Town Council is Roteños Unidos.

== Sports ==
Rota has two football (soccer) teams: CD Rota and UD Roteña, and also a basketball team: C.D. Don Bosco 88.

== See also ==
- Category:People from Rota, Spain
- Costa de la Luz
- La Rábida Friary
- Naval Station Rota Spain
- List of municipalities in Cádiz
