= Rayo Vallecano =

Association football club in Spain

- Full name: Rayo Vallecano de Madrid, S.A.D.
- Nicknames: Los Franjirrojos (The Red Sashes); Rayito (Little lightning bolt); Orgullo de la clase obrera (The Pride of the Working class); El Matagigantes (The Giant-killer)
- Founded: 29 May 1924; 102 years ago as Agrupación Deportiva El Rayo
- Stadium: Vallecas Stadium
- Capacity: 14,708
- Coordinates: 40°23′30.6″N 3°39′30.9″W
- Owner: Raúl Martín Presa
- President: Raúl Martín Presa
- Head coach: Beñat San José
- League: La Liga
- 2025–26: La Liga, 8th of 20
- Website: rayovallecano.es
Home colours	Away colours	Third colours

Rayo Vallecano de Madrid, S.A.D. (Spanish pronunciation: [ˈraʝo βaʎeˈkano ðe maˈðɾið]), (Note: In isolation, Vallecano is pronounced [baʎeˈkano].) often abbreviated to Rayo (Spanish for "lightning bolt"), is a professional football club based in the Puente de Vallecas district of Madrid, Spain. The club competes in La Liga, the top flight of Spanish football.

Founded on 29 May 1924, the club is known for its sociocultural tradition, recognized for representing the barrio-local culture and its working-class status. Its home matches have been played at the 14,708-capacity Campo de Fútbol de Vallecas stadium since 1976.

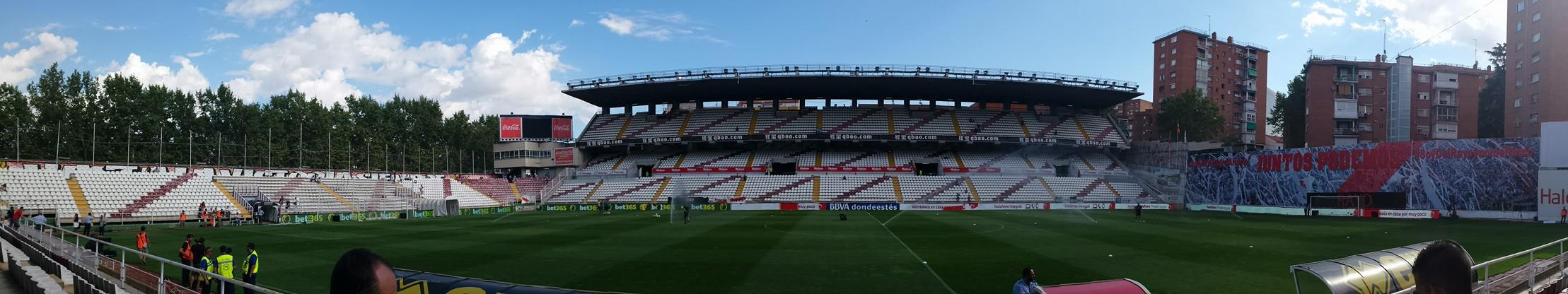
Rayo Vallecano home stadium Vallecas.

During its history, Rayo has spent 22 seasons in the top-flight, and has played in two European competitions, the UEFA Cup in the 2000–01 season and the 2025–26 UEFA Conference League. The club won the 2017–18 Segunda División. By historical performance, Rayo is the third best club in Community of Madrid, after Real Madrid and Atlético Madrid.

== History ==
=== Establishment and early years ===
Rayo Vallecano was founded on 29 May 1924 in the hometown of Prudencia Priego, wife of the club's first president Julián Huerta. Greatly inspired by Argentina's River Plate, in 1949, after an agreement with Atlético Madrid, a red diagonal stripe was added to the team's kit, and the club reached Tercera División for the first time in its history.

=== Yo-yo years ===
One of the perennial yo-yo clubs of Spanish football, and always in the shadow of the two biggest clubs in the city (Real Madrid and Atlético Madrid), Rayo Vallecano spent many years during the 1980s and 1990s moving back and forth between La Liga and Segunda División. The 1983–84 season was the worst during the 1980s. The club finished in the last position in Segunda División and was relegated to Segunda División B.

Due to a tragedy Rayo Vallecano turned out to be Laurie Cunningham's last club; he was killed in a car crash just outside Madrid in 1989, after a sole season. He had recently won an F.A. Cup winners medal with Wimbledon F.C. in England the previous year and had also represented neighbours Real Madrid for four years.

They appeared to have consolidated their top flight status after gaining promotion in 1999, and the team's most successful season came in 2000–01 when they reached the quarter-finals of the UEFA Cup, going out only to eventual runners-up Alavés; Rayo finished ninth in the previous campaign, but entered the competition via the fair play draw.

=== 2003–11: Segunda División and below ===
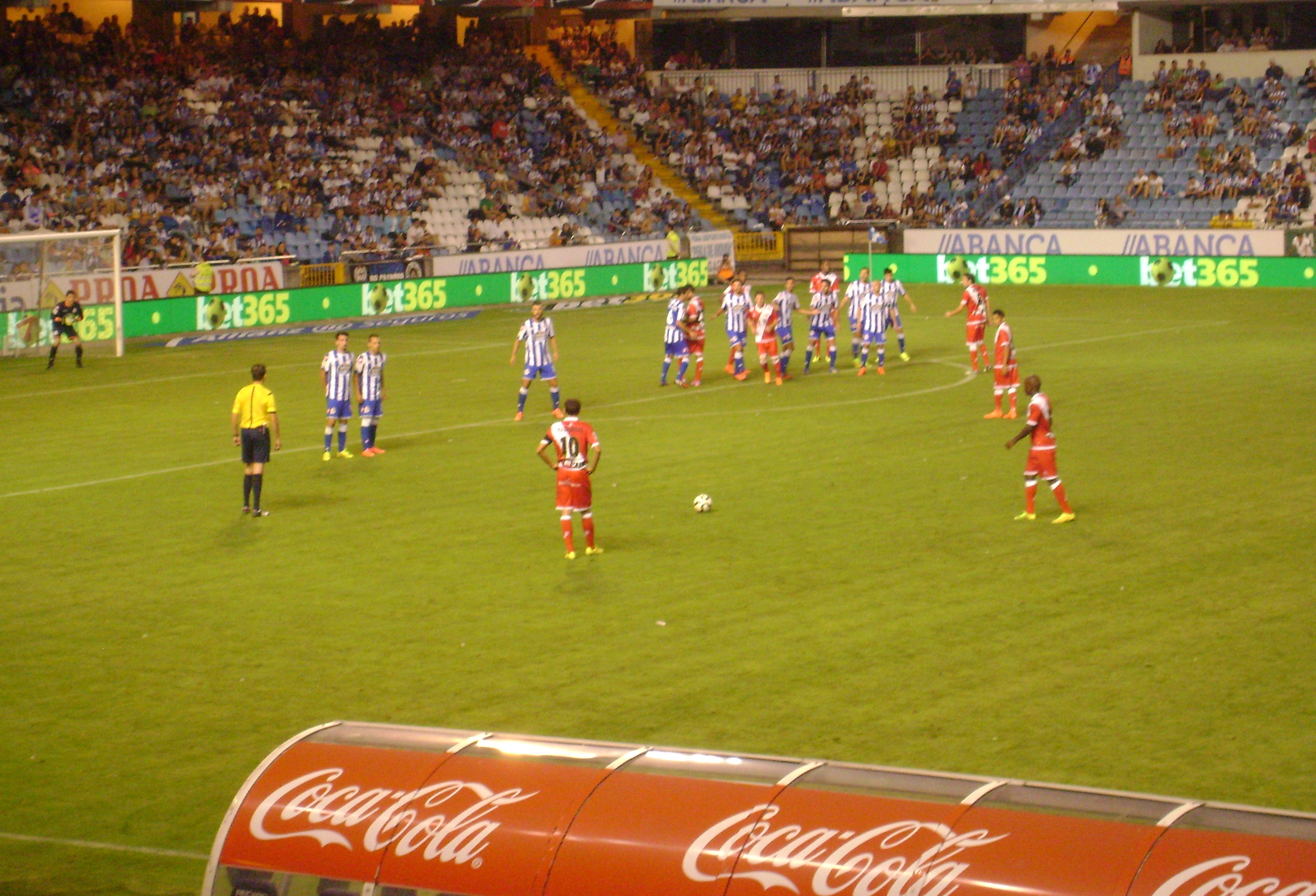
Deportivo de La Coruña vs. Rayo Vallecano

However, the club shortly thereafter fell on hard times, enduring successive relegations in 2003 and 2004. For 2005–06 manager Míchel, a Real Madrid legend in the 1980s and '90s, was hired.

Rayo finished the 2006–07 season in second place in Segunda División B, winning the promotion play-off semifinal but losing in the final to Eibar (1–2 aggregate). The following campaign, the team returned to division two after a four-year absence after a victorious run in the playoffs, disposing of Benidorm in the semi-final and Zamora in the last game 2–1 on aggregate.

In its first seasons back in the second tier of Spanish football, Rayo finished comfortably, often either in or just outside the promotion places. In 2010–11, the team ranked in second position and returned to the top flight after an eight-year absence, only trailing champions Real Betis in spite of very serious economic problems.

=== 2011–: La Liga and Segunda División yo-yo, and European football ===
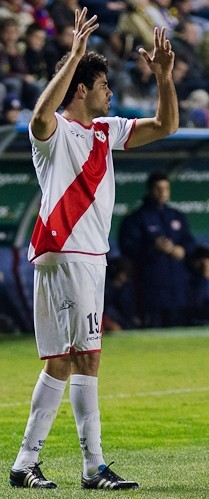
Diego Costa with Rayo Vallecano in 2012

Chart of Rayo Vallecano league performance 1929–present

In March 2014, Huawei agreed to sponsor Rayo Vallecano for two league matches against Real Madrid and Athletic Bilbao.

In August 2015, Rayo Vallecano purchased the majority of Oklahoma City FC, a NASL expansion franchise which had yet to officially play a game renaming the club to Rayo OKC, despite the stadium increasingly needing work. It was the first ever entry of a Spanish club into the American sports market and mirrored a 2013 sponsorship agreement with Qbao in terms of expanding the club's profile overseas. Rayo OKC folded after a year due to Rayo Vallecano's relegation from La Liga and a dispute between the co-owners led to less finance for the U.S. side.

In May 2016, Rayo Vallecano were relegated to the Segunda División, finishing 18th in the 2015–16 La Liga season. This ended their five-year streak in La Liga, their longest ever stay in the top-flight. Their first season back in the second division was a poor one, with both problems on the field and off, and they finished in 12th position. Rayo went through three managers in the 2016–17 Segunda División season before finally settling on club legend Míchel. He revived the club from the relegation places to 12th, almost making the playoffs.

At the start of the 2017–18 Segunda División season, the club appointed their recently retired goalkeeper David Cobeño as the sporting director of the club. They secured their promotion with a 1–0 over CD Lugo with one game remaining. That season the club won Segunda División with 76 points in 42 games.

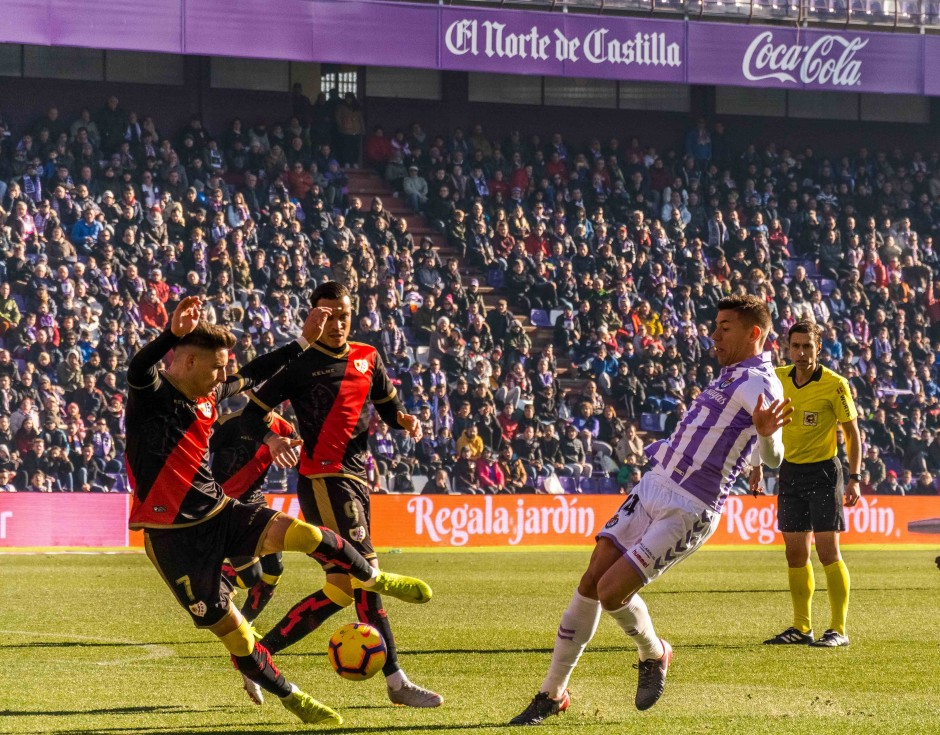
Rayo players during an away La Liga fixture versus Real Valladolid in January 2019

On 20 March 2019, the club appointed Paco Jémez as head coach, and on 4 May, Rayo was relegated back to the Segunda División after losing 4–1 to Levante UD, eventually finishing last.

In August 2020, the club appointed Andoni Iraola as head coach. They finished sixth and won promotion in the playoffs against Girona FC; despite losing the first leg at home 1–2, the team came back to win the second leg 2–0 away to claim a place in La Liga for 2021–22. In February 2022, Iraola's side defeated RCD Mallorca to make the semi-finals of the Copa del Rey; it was the second time in club history and first since 1982. The club finished 12th in La Liga. This was a big achievement as they were by far the league's smallest team, and most had predicted that they would be relegated. They once again qualified for European football after 24 years, entering into the UEFA Conference League play-offs by finishing 8th in 2024-25 season. They went on to make their debut appearances in a major UEFA competition group or league phase by reaching the 2025–26 UEFA Conference League league phase. They finished the league phase in fifth place (out of 36) qualifying directly to the round of 16, and subsequently qualified for their first-ever European semi-final and final.

On 27 May 2026 in their first ever European final, they lost 1-0 to Crystal Palace.

== Previous names ==
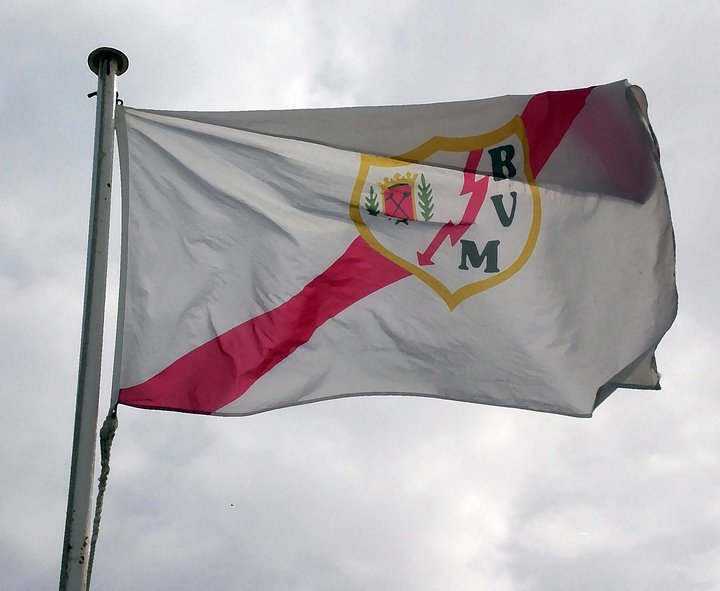
Flag with the club's crest at Ciudad Deportiva Rayo Vallecano

- Agrupación Deportiva El Rayo (29 May 1924 – 13 November 1947)
- Agrupación Deportiva Rayo Vallecano (13 November 1947 – 1995)
- Rayo Vallecano de Madrid (1995–present)

N.B. Affiliate of Atlético Madrid in 1949–50

== Club culture and supporters ==
Rayo Vallecano is a football club based in the Vallecas neighbourhood of Madrid, traditionally considered a working-class area with a strong leftist identity. Vallecas was a Republican stronghold during the Spanish Civil War and grew significantly under the Franco regime as it received migrants from other parts of Spain, many of whom had experienced economic hardship or political repression. The club is closely associated with the local community, and both the neighbourhood and the club maintain a distinct identity, often emphasised through the alternative spelling "Vallekas".

Consequently, Rayo Vallecano’s supporters, particularly the ultras group Bukaneros, are often left-wing, anti-fascist, and politically active. In the stands, they regularly display banners, flags, and visual displays expressing opposition to racism, fascism, homophobia, and the commercialisation of football, while also supporting women's rights, workers' rights, and international solidarity, including pro-Palestine messaging. Chants often carry political content, and fans have a tradition of imaginative collective protest, such as mocking league decisions on match scheduling or highlighting perceived exploitation of supporters. Republican flags, Che Guevara images, and the Spanish Civil War slogan "¡No pasarán!" are commonly displayed at games. In 2014 the club and fan base aided Carmen Martinez Ayudo, an 85-year-old local woman, after she was evicted from her home, and flew banners reading "The evictions of a sick state, the solidarity of a working-class neighbourhood" displayed at the following match.

In late March 2012, the Rayo squad took one day off training to join demonstrations supporting the 2011–12 Spanish protests.

The fanbase actively enforces its political views; In February 2017, Ukrainian player Roman Zozulya left the club after one training session due to chants by Rayo fans accusing him of far-right affiliations; Zozulya denied any such associations and returned to his parent club Real Betis. Following the training ground incident, Rayo Vallecano fans continued to target Roman Zozulya in December 2019 during a Segunda División match against Albacete Balompié, whom Zozulya eventually moved to. The match was abandoned at half-time after home supporters chanted "Zozulya, you are a Nazi!". The league, both clubs, and the referee agreed to suspend the game to protect players and uphold competition values. Rayo's president, Raúl Martín Presa, publicly condemned the chants and met with Zozulya to express support and respect.

Supporters of the club have come into conflict with clubs of opposing ideologies: Rayo Vallecano fans have violently clashed with right-wing nationalist supporters, including Polish clubs Jagiellonia Białystok and Lech Poznań, during encounters that both occurred in 2025.

In September 2025, members of the Bukaneros were reported to have acted as part of a security detail escorting Podemos leaders Ione Belarra and Irene Montero during pro-Palestinian protests at the end of a stage of Vuelta a España in Madrid. The group was coordinated by lawyer Erlantz Ibarrondo, a long-standing figure on the Spanish radical left, and included other Bukaneros supporters. The protests involved clashes with police, with 22 officers injured and two people arrested, and led to the suspension of the stage finish and award ceremony in Plaza de Cibeles. The Bukaneros and legal team were present to prevent the political leaders from being crowded or attacked by other demonstrators.

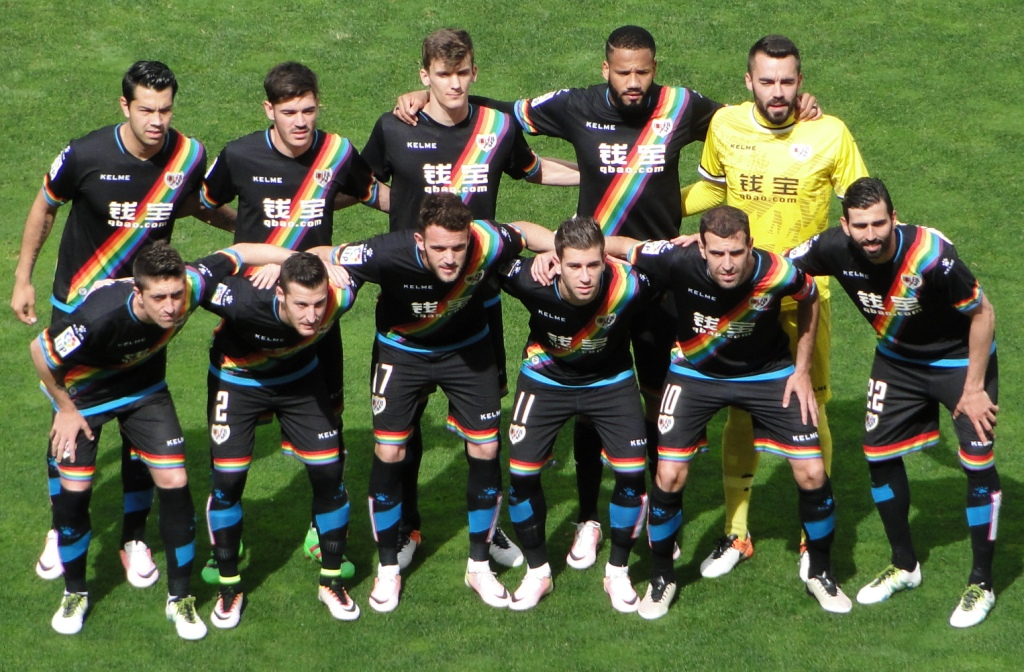
Kits featuring rainbow symbolism used by Rayo Vallecano in 2015/2016 to represent various causes. Los Bukaneros criticised the concept on the basis that they did not believe the management at the club was doing enough to support those causes.

The fanbase is independent and frequently opposes the club's management. Rayo Vallecano's fans do not have a good relationship with the current owner Raúl Martín Presa and regularly chant for him to leave. In July 2015, Rayo Vallecano unveiled a new kit featuring a rainbow, with each colour representing a different social cause: red for those fighting cancer, orange for disability integration, yellow for hope, green for environmental protection, blue against child abuse, indigo against domestic abuse, and violet for LGBTQ+ equality. Part of the proceeds from kit sales were pledged to these causes. While broadly praised by the public, the Bukaneros criticised it as cynical and superficial move by management and accused management of not genuinely supporting those causes.

=== Anthems and songs ===
Although most people recognise the supporting songs by ska-punk band Ska-P (Rayo Vallecano and Como un rayo), Rayo Vallecano has an official anthem which played at their home stadium before matches.

The club is also known for chanting the song "La Vida Pirata" (English: "The Pirate Life"), a song about pirates, which the Bukaneros are named after.

== Honours ==
=== League ===
- Segunda División (2nd tier)
  - Winners (1): 2017–18
- Tercera División (3rd tier)
  - Winners (2): 1955–56, 1964–65
- Segunda División B (3rd tier)
  - Winners (2): 1984–85, 2007–08

== Season to season ==
Season	Tier	Division	Place	Copa del Rey
1940–41	5	2ª Reg.	2nd	
1941–42	4	1ª Reg.	4th	
1942–43	4	1ª Reg.	3rd	
1943–44	4	1ª Reg.	7th	
1944–45	5	2ª Reg.	2nd	
1945–46	4	1ª Reg.	5th	
1946–47	4	1ª Reg.	10th	
1947–48	4	1ª Reg.	6th	
1948–49	4	1ª Reg.	3rd	
1949–50	3	3ª	14th	
1950–51	3	3ª	13th	
1951–52	3	3ª	9th	
1952–53	3	3ª	7th	
1953–54	3	3ª	17th	
1954–55	3	3ª	2nd	
1955–56	3	3ª	1st	
1956–57	2	2ª	12th	
1957–58	2	2ª	6th	
1958–59	2	2ª	14th	First round
1959–60	2	2ª	5th	First round

Season	Tier	Division	Place	Copa del Rey
1960–61	2	2ª	16th	First round
1961–62	3	3ª	3rd	
1962–63	3	3ª	2nd	
1963–64	3	3ª	3rd	
1964–65	3	3ª	1st	
1965–66	2	2ª	9th	First round
1966–67	2	2ª	6th	First round
1967–68	2	2ª	4th	Round of 32
1968–69	2	2ª	9th	
1969–70	2	2ª	6th	Round of 32
1970–71	2	2ª	5th	Round of 32
1971–72	2	2ª	8th	Fourth round
1972–73	2	2ª	11th	Third round
1973–74	2	2ª	14th	Round of 16
1974–75	2	2ª	8th	Fourth round
1975–76	2	2ª	9th	Second round
1976–77	2	2ª	3rd	Third round
1977–78	1	1ª	10th	Third round
1978–79	1	1ª	15th	Round of 16
1979–80	1	1ª	16th	Quarter-finals

Season	Tier	Division	Place	Copa del Rey
1980–81	2	2ª	5th	Quarter-finals
1981–82	2	2ª	7th	Semi-finals
1982–83	2	2ª	9th	Round of 16
1983–84	2	2ª	20th	Third round
1984–85	3	2ª B	1st	Third round
1985–86	2	2ª	15th	Fourth round
1986–87	2	2ª	5th	First round
1987–88	2	2ª	5th	Round of 32
1988–89	2	2ª	2nd	First round
1989–90	1	1ª	20th	Second round
1990–91	2	2ª	11th	Fifth round
1991–92	2	2ª	2nd	Fourth round
1992–93	1	1ª	14th	Fourth round
1993–94	1	1ª	17th	Fourth round
1994–95	2	2ª	2nd	Quarter-finals
1995–96	1	1ª	19th	Third round
1996–97	1	1ª	18th	Quarter-finals
1997–98	2	2ª	8th	Second round
1998–99	2	2ª	5th	First round
1999–2000	1	1ª	9th	Quarter-finals

Season	Tier	Division	Place	Copa del Rey
2000–01	1	1ª	14th	Round of 16
2001–02	1	1ª	11th	Quarter-finals
2002–03	1	1ª	20th	Round of 64
2003–04	2	2ª	21st	Round of 64
2004–05	3	2ª B	3rd	Round of 64
2005–06	3	2ª B	5th	Third round
2006–07	3	2ª B	2nd	Round of 16
2007–08	3	2ª B	1st	Third round
2008–09	2	2ª	5th	Round of 32
2009–10	2	2ª	11th	Round of 16
2010–11	2	2ª	2nd	Third round
2011–12	1	1ª	15th	Round of 32
2012–13	1	1ª	8th	Round of 32
2013–14	1	1ª	12th	Round of 16
2014–15	1	1ª	11th	Round of 32
2015–16	1	1ª	18th	Round of 16
2016–17	2	2ª	12th	Third round
2017–18	2	2ª	1st	Second round
2018–19	1	1ª	20th	Round of 32
2019–20	2	2ª	7th	Round of 16

Season	Tier	Division	Place	Copa del Rey
2020–21	2	2ª	6th	Round of 16
2021–22	1	1ª	12th	Semi-finals
2022–23	1	1ª	11th	Round of 32
2023–24	1	1ª	17th	Round of 16
2024–25	1	1ª	8th	Round of 16
2025–26	1	1ª	8th	Round of 16
2026–27	1	1ª		TBD

- 24 seasons in La Liga
- 38 seasons in Segunda División
- 5 seasons in Segunda División B
- 11 seasons in Tercera División (third level before 1977–78)

== European history ==
Season	Round	Opponent	Home	Away	Aggregate
2000–01 UEFA Cup	Qualifying round	(Andorra) Constel·lació Esportiva	6–0	10–0	16–0
2000–01 UEFA Cup	First round	(Norway) Molde	1–1	1–0	2–1
2000–01 UEFA Cup	Second round	(Denmark) Viborg	1–0	1–2	2–2 (a)
2000–01 UEFA Cup	Third round	(Russia) Lokomotiv Moscow	2–0	0–0	2–0
2000–01 UEFA Cup	Fourth round	(France) Bordeaux	4–1	2–1	6–2
2000–01 UEFA Cup	Quarter-finals	(Spain) Alavés	2–1	0–3	2–4
2025–26 UEFA Conference League	Play-off round	(Belarus) Neman Grodno	4–0	1–0	5–0
2025–26 UEFA Conference League	League phase	(North Macedonia) Shkëndija	2–0	—N/a	5th
2025–26 UEFA Conference League	League phase	(Sweden) BK Häcken	—N/a	2–2	5th
2025–26 UEFA Conference League	League phase	(Poland) Lech Poznań	3–2	—N/a	5th
2025–26 UEFA Conference League	League phase	(Slovakia) Slovan Bratislava	—N/a	1–2	5th
2025–26 UEFA Conference League	League phase	(Poland) Jagiellonia Białystok	—N/a	2–1	5th
2025–26 UEFA Conference League	League phase	(Kosovo) Drita	3–0	—N/a	5th
2025–26 UEFA Conference League	Round of 16	(Turkey) Samsunspor	0–1	3–1	3–2
2025–26 UEFA Conference League	Quarter-finals	(Greece) AEK Athens	3–0	1–3	4–3
2025–26 UEFA Conference League	Semi-finals	(France) Strasbourg	1–0	1–0	2–0
2025–26 UEFA Conference League	Final	(England) Crystal Palace	0–1 (N)		

== Current squad ==
As of 3 September 2026

Note: Flags indicate national team as defined under FIFA eligibility rules; some limited exceptions apply. Players may hold more than one non-FIFA nationality.

No.	Pos.	Nation	Player
1	GK	ESP	Dani Cárdenas
2	DF	ROU	Andrei Rațiu
3	DF	ALB	Marash Kumbulla (on loan from Roma)
4	MF	ESP	Pedro Díaz
5	DF	ITA	Luiz Felipe
6	MF	SEN	Pathé Ciss
7	FW	ESP	Isi Palazón (vice-captain)
8	MF	ESP	Unai López
9	FW	BRA	Alemão
10	FW	ESP	Sergio Camello
11	FW	ANG	Randy Nteka
13	GK	ARG	Augusto Batalla
14	MF	GEO	Giorgi Tsitaishvili

No.	Pos.	Nation	Player
15	DF	ESP	Mujaid Sadick (on loan from Genk)
17	DF	ESP	Adrià Pedrosa (on loan from Sevilla)
18	MF	ESP	Álvaro García
19	FW	ESP	Jorge de Frutos
20	DF	ALB	Iván Balliu
21	FW	ESP	Fran Pérez
22	DF	ESP	Pelayo Fernández
23	MF	ESP	Óscar Valentín (captain)
24	DF	FRA	Florian Lejeune
25	GK	IDN	Emil Audero (on loan from Como)
33	DF	NED	Jozhua Vertrouwd
36	MF	ESP	Gnangoro Bouare
37	MF	ESP	Rayane Belaid

=== Reserve team ===
Note: Flags indicate national team as defined under FIFA eligibility rules; some limited exceptions apply. Players may hold more than one non-FIFA nationality.

No.	Pos.	Nation	Player
26	DF	ESP	Marco de las Sías
27	DF	ESP	Sergio Lozano
28	MF	ESP	Samu Becerra

No.	Pos.	Nation	Player
30	GK	ESP	Adrián Molina
31	MF	ESP	Marco Román
34	MF	ESP	Iván Alonso

=== Other players under contract ===
Note: Flags indicate national team as defined under FIFA eligibility rules; some limited exceptions apply. Players may hold more than one non-FIFA nationality.

No.	Pos.	Nation	Player
—	FW	ESP	Raúl de Tomás

=== Out on loan ===
Note: Flags indicate national team as defined under FIFA eligibility rules; some limited exceptions apply. Players may hold more than one non-FIFA nationality.

No.	Pos.	Nation	Player
—	FW	CMR	Etienne Eto'o (at Racing Ferrol until 30 June 2027)

=== Current technical staff ===
Position	Staff
Head coach	(Spain) Beñat San José
Assistant coach	(Spain) Iban Fagoaga
Technical assistant	(Spain) Alejandro Hernández
Equipment manager	(Spain) Kiko Jiménez (Spain) José Vargas
Delegate	(Spain) Miguel Ortiz
Goalkeeper coach	(Spain) Alberto González (Spain) Pedro Moncayo
Fitness coach	(Spain) Gastón Lloverás
Analyst	(Spain) Ángel Dongil
Rehab fitness coach	(Spain) Eduardo Sánchez
Physiotherapist	(Spain) Miguel Ángel Martín (Aruba) Marcos Marín
Doctor	(Spain) Giovanni Mazzocca (Aruba) Carlos Beceiro

Last updated: 5 August 2026
Source: Rayo Vallecano

== Notable players ==
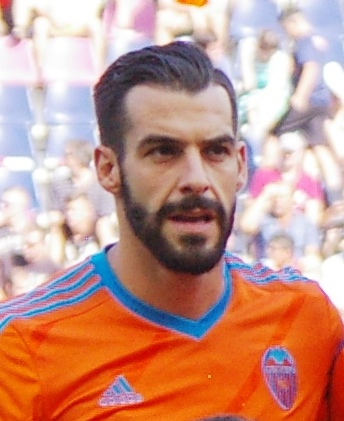
Álvaro Negredo

Note: this list includes players that have played at least 100 league games and/or have reached international status.

- (Andorra) Ildefons Lima
- (Argentina) Francisco Cerro
- (Argentina) Franco Di Santo
- (Argentina) Alejandro Domínguez
- (Argentina) Leonel Galeano
- (Argentina) Paulo Gazzaniga
- (Argentina) Sebastián Saja
- (Argentina) Óscar Trejo
- (Armenia) Aras Özbiliz
- (Angola) Manucho
- (Austria) Toni Polster
- (Bosnia and Herzegovina) Elvir Baljić
- (Bosnia and Herzegovina) Elvir Bolić
- (Brazil) Guilherme
- (Chile) Jorge Valdivia
- (Chile) Fernando Vergara
- (China) Zhang Chengdong
- (Colombia) Johan Mojica
- (Costa Rica) Hernán Medford
- (Croatia) Stjepan Andrijašević
- (Democratic Republic of the Congo) Gaël Kakuta
- (Denmark) Søren Andersen
- (Denmark) Nicki Bille
- (England) Laurie Cunningham
- (Equatorial Guinea) Sergio Akieme
- (Equatorial Guinea) Iván Zarandona
- (Ghana) Derek Boateng
- (Guinea) Lass Bangoura
- (Indonesia) Jordi Amat
- (Israel) Idan Tal
- (Mali) Ousseynou Cissé
- (Mexico) Javier Aquino
- (Mexico) Nery Castillo
- (Mexico) Guillermo Mendizábal
- (Mexico) Hugo Sánchez
- (Montenegro) Andrija Delibašić
- (Netherlands) Dave van den Bergh
- (Nigeria) Uche Agbo
- (Nigeria) Wilfred Agbonavbare
- (North Macedonia) Stole Dimitrievski
- (Norway) Jan Berg
- (Peru) Luis Advíncula
- (Peru) Christian Cueva
- (Portugal) Licá
- (Portugal) Paulo Torres
- (Portugal) Zé Castro
- (Saudi Arabia) Abdulmajeed Al-Sulaiheem
- (Romania) Răzvan Raț
- (Russia) Viktor Onopko
- (Senegal) Abdoulaye Ba
- (Senegal) Mohamed Diamé
- (Serbia) Ivan Tomić
- (Serbia) Josip Višnjić
- (Spain) Miguel Albiol
- (Spain) Antonio Amaya
- (Spain) Gregorio Benito
- (Spain) Bolo
- (Spain) Raúl Bravo
- (Spain) Antonio Calderón
- (Spain) Rubén Cano
- (Spain) Luis Cembranos
- (Spain) David Cobeño
- (Spain) Coke
- (Spain) Juan José Collantes
- (Spain) Pedro Contreras
- (Spain) Diego Costa
- (Spain) Cota
- (Spain) Ramón de Quintana
- (Spain) Adri Embarba
- (Spain) Felines
- (Spain) Patxi Ferreira
- (Spain) Javi Fuego
- (Spain) Ricardo Gallego
- (Spain) Antonio García Navajas
- (Spain) Antonio Guzmán
- (Spain) Pablo Hernández
- (Spain) Carlos Llorens
- (Spain) Diego Llorente
- (Spain) Julen Lopetegui
- (Spain) Míchel
- (Spain) Michu
- (Spain) José María Movilla
- (Spain) Juan Muñiz
- (Spain) Álvaro Negredo
- (Spain) Saúl Ñíguez
- (Spain) Pepín
- (Spain) Roberto Peragón
- (Spain) Piti
- (Spain) Abel Resino
- (Spain) Onésimo Sánchez
- (Spain) Pablo Sanz
- (Spain) Mario Suárez
- (Spain) Raúl Tamudo
- (Spain) Roberto Trashorras
- (Spain) Toni Jiménez
- (Spain) José Luis Veloso
- (Ukraine) Roman Zozulya
- (United States) Kasey Keller
- (Uruguay) Sebastián Fernández
- (Uruguay) Álvaro Gutiérrez
- (Uruguay) Josemir Lujambio
- (Uruguay) Fernando Morena
- (Uruguay) Emiliano Velázquez
- (Venezuela) Julio Álvarez
- (Venezuela) Dani Hernández
- (Venezuela) Miku
- (Venezuela) Daniel Noriega

== Coaches ==
Dates	Name
1944–46	(Spain) Cayetano Sardinero
1946–47	(Spain) Julián Antón
1947–48	(Spain) Luis Pérez
1948–49	(Spain) Tomás Rodríguez Rubio
1949–50	(Spain) Ramón de la Fuente
1950–51	(Spain) Anselmo Nogales
1951–52	(Spain) Félix Huete
1952–53	(Spain) Lorenzo Sánchez Villar
1954–55	(Spain) Cándido Machado
1953–54	(Spain) Patricio Sánchez Calleja
1954–55	(Spain) Manuel Alepuz
1955–56	(Spain) Cándido Machado
1956–58	(Spain) Ramón Colón
1958	(Spain) Cándido Machado
1958–59	(Argentina) Lino Taioli
1959	(Paraguay) Heriberto Herrera
1959–60	(Spain) Ramón Colón
1960	(Spain) Alfonso Aparicio
1960–61	(Spain) Martín Camino
1961	(Spain) Ramón Cobo
1961	(Spain) Joseíto
1961–64	(Spain) Herrero
1964–67	(Spain) Pedro Eguiluz
July 1967 – June 1969	(Spain) José Antonio Olmedo
July 1969 – Feb 1971	(Spain) Manuel Peñalva
Feb 1971 – Jun 1972	(Spain) Enrique Orizaola

Dates	Name
Jul 1972 – Jan 1973	(Spain) Manuel Vences
Jan 1973 – Jun 1974	(Spain) José Antonio Olmedo
Jun 1974 – Jun 1975	(Uruguay) Héctor Núñez
Jun 1975 – Feb 1976	(Argentina) (Spain) Alfredo Di Stéfano
Feb – Jun 1976	(Spain) José Antonio Olmedo
Jul 1976 – Jun 1977	(Spain) García Verdugo
Jun 1977 – Jun 1978	(Uruguay) Héctor Núñez
Jul 1978 – Jun 1979	(Spain) Eduardo González
Jun 1979 – Feb 1980	(Uruguay) Héctor Núñez
Feb – Jun 1980	(Spain) Rafael Iriondo
Jun 1980 – Dec 1981	(Spain) Eduardo González
Dec 1981 – Jun 1982	(Spain) Manuel Peñalva
Jun 1982 – Jun 1983	(Spain) Juanjo García
Jul – Nov 1983	(Spain) Máximo Hernández
Nov 1983 – Jun 1984	(Spain) Antonio Ruiz
1984–85	(Spain) Eduardo Caturla
1985–87	(Uruguay) Héctor Núñez
Jul 1987 – Jan 1990	(Spain) Felines
Jan – Jun 1990	(Spain) Emilio Cruz
Jul 1990 – Feb 1992	(Spain) Eusebio Ríos
Feb 1992 – Jun 1993	(Spain) José Antonio Camacho
Jul – Nov 1993	(Spain) Felines
Nov 1993 – Feb 1994	(Spain) Fernando Zambrano
Feb – Nov 1994	(Spain) David Vidal
Nov 1994 – Jun 1995	(Spain) Paquito
Jun – Oct 1995	(Spain) Pedro Mari Zabalza

Dates	Name
Oct 1995 – Apr 1996	(Spain) Marcos Alonso
July 1996 – Feb 1997	(Spain) Paquito
Feb – Mar 1997	(Spain) Fernando Zambrano
Mar – Jun 1997	(Spain) Máximo Hernández
1997–98	(Spain) Josu Ortuondo
Jul 1998 – Jun 2001	(Spain) Juande Ramos
Jul – Oct 2001	(Spain) Andoni Goikoetxea
Oct 2001 – Jun 2002	(Spain) Gregorio Manzano
July 2002 – Jan 2003	(Spain) Fernando Vázquez
Feb – Apr 2003	(Paraguay) Gustavo Benítez
Apr – Jun 2003	(Spain) Antonio Iriondo
Jun – Nov 2003	(Spain) Julen Lopetegui
Nov 2003 – Feb 2004	(Argentina) Jorge D'Alessandro
Feb – Jun 2004	(Spain) Txetxu Rojo
Jun 2004 – Jun 2005	(Spain) Carlos Orúe
Jul 2005 – Jun 2006	(Spain) Míchel
Jun 2006 – Feb 2010	(Spain) Pepe Mel
Feb – Jun 2010	(Spain) Felipe Miñambres
Jul 2010 – Jun 2012	(Spain) José Ramón Sandoval
Jul 2012 – May 2016	(Spain) Paco Jémez
Jun – Nov 2016	(Spain) José Ramón Sandoval
Nov 2016 – Feb 2017	(Spain) Rubén Baraja
Feb 2017 – Mar 2019	(Spain) Míchel
Mar 2019 – Aug 2020	(Spain) Paco Jémez
Aug 2020 – Jun 2023	(Spain) Andoni Iraola
Jul 2023 – Feb 2024	(Spain) Francisco

== Club presidents ==
Dates	Name
1924–26	Julián Huerta
1926–27	José Montoya
1927–28	Galo Andrés
1929–30	José Antonio Sánchez
1930–31	Anastasio Sánchez
1931–36	Ángel Martínez

Dates	Name
1939–43	Miguel Rodríguez Alzola
1943–46	Ezequiel Huerta
1946–48	José Rodríguez Rubio
1948–55	Miguel Rodríguez Alzola
1955–58	Jerónimo Martínez
1958–61	Tomás Esteras

Dates	Name
1961–65	Iván Roiz
1965–73	Pedro Roiz
1973–78	Marcelino Gil
1978–80	Francisco Encinas
1980–81	Luis Quer
1981–89	Francisco Fontán

Dates	Name
1989–91	Pedro García Jiménez
1991–94	José María Ruiz Mateos
1994–2011	Teresa Rivero
2011–	Raúl Martín Presa

== Stadium ==
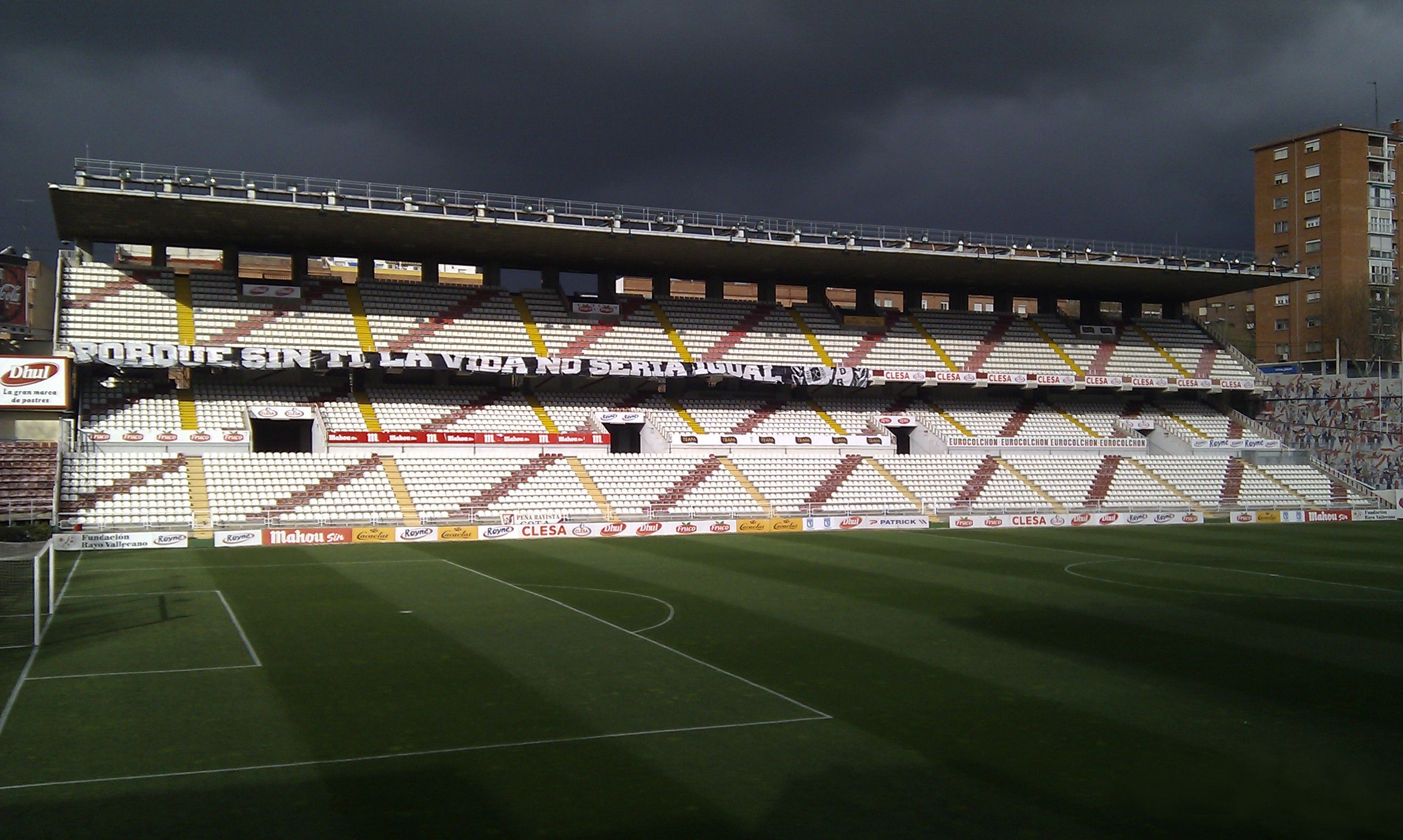
Campo de Fútbol de Vallecas

Campo de Fútbol de Vallecas is a football stadium located on Calle Payaso Fofó 1, Vallecas. Opened on 10 May 1976, at first it was called "New Stadium Vallecas", but in January 2004, 13 years after the arrival of the Ruiz-Mateos family in 1991, it changed denominations, as the wife was also named by her husband, businessman José María, the first woman president of an elite football team.

It has a capacity of 14,708 spectators in an all-seated format and dimensions of 100×67 m. after the enlargement of the width and the reduction of the length of the pitch after the remodelling of the grandstands, compulsory due to the elimination of the fences surrounding the pitch. The pitch is one the smallest in La Liga. Additionally, one of the goal ends does not have a grandstand, just a big wall with information panels.

In June 2009, the club announced plans for the construction of a new stadium. Nevertheless, the Autonomous Community of Madrid, owner of the stadium, has not any plan as far as it is known in 2023.
