= José María Ruiz-Mateos =

Spanish businessman and politician (1931–2015)

José María Ruiz-Mateos y Jiménez de Tejada
- Marquis of Olivara; Lord of Tejada
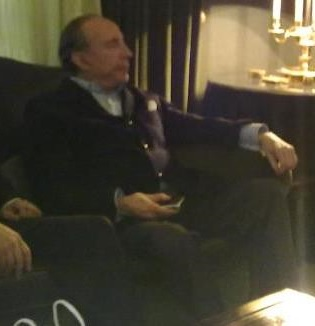
- Born: 11 April 1931; Rota, Spain
- Died: 7 September 2015 (aged 84); El Puerto de Santa María, Spain

José María Ruiz-Mateos y Jiménez de Tejada (11 April 1931 – 7 September 2015) was a Spanish businessman and politician.

== Biography ==
He began by exporting wine to England. As the son of a small sherry producer, he managed to sign a monster contract in 1964, becoming the exclusive supplier to John Harvey & Sons. As this required more sherry wine than his family bodega could supply, he started buying other wineries. At the heart of his wine group was the company Bodegas Internacionales.

He founded the conglomerate Rumasa (Ruiz Mateos Sociedad Anónima) and had considerable influence in Spanish society. The group included several banks, hotels, wineries, supermarkets and luxury stores, insurance companies, construction firms... In 1983, the government of Spain (the Socialist Party was in office at the time and led by Felipe González) expropriated the company. The government alleged that Rumasa had failed to pay millions of pesetas in mandatory taxes to the national treasury. The government also claimed that Rumasa was in virtual bankruptcy and that it was still afloat thanks solely to imaginative accounting by the auditing department of the company. Ruiz Mateos disagreed with this assessment. He sued the government for compensation, but lost in court.

He was imprisoned on charges of currency smuggling, fraud and tax evasion.

After several years in jail, he went back into public life, became the owner of the Rayo Vallecano football (soccer) team in 1991, and formed his own political party, as part of which he was elected to the European Parliament in 1989 and consequently achieved the judicial immunity that he was looking for. He also founded a new holding company, New Rumasa, with 16,000 employees. There have been multiple and various court rulings on the Rumasa case both in Spain and outside Spain; the Supreme Court and the Constitutional Court have both spoken on numerous judgments. Ruíz Mateos was acquitted in 1999 by the Spanish Supreme Court.

He was a well-known member of Opus Dei, though he was expelled from the group in 1986.

Ruíz Mateos was the father of 13 sons and daughters.

On 17 February 2011 the ten largest companies within the Nueva Rumasa group were declared in default and unable to make payments to their creditors after the Spanish Social Security, Royal Bank of Scotland and others requested that liens be placed on the companies' assets, nearly twenty-eight years to the day on which his original holding company, Rumasa, was expropriated by the Spanish government.

== Foundation Ruiz Mateos ==
The Ruiz-Mateos Foundation was created in 1978 under the sponsorship of the Ruiz-Mateos family, for the stated purpose of developing cultural pursuits, especially the visual arts, music and literature. The foundation runs competitions annually, and awards a prize called the "Villa de Rota" in each of these three areas. The Foundation's collection of contemporary art is funded by the competition entrance fees and by the donations of exhibitors who use its exhibition rooms. Among other artists, the museum exhibits works by Manuel Benitez Reyes, Wenceslao Robles and Francisco Luque. The Foundation museum, created in 2005, is located in an old family house built in 1865.
