= 2011–12 Levante UD season =

Levante UD
2011–12 season
- President: Quico Catalán
- Head coach: Juan Ignacio Martínez
- Stadium: Ciutat de València
- La Liga: 6th
- Copa del Rey: Quarter-finals
- Top goalscorer: League: Arouna Koné (15); All: Arouna Koné (17)
Home colours	Away colours	Third colours

The 2011–12 season was the 71st season in Levante's history and their second consecutive season in La Liga.

Under the leadership of the new manager Juan Ignacio Martínez, who replaced Luis García Plaza, the club aimed to stay in the top flight of Spanish football for another season — a clause was even added to extend the contract for one more season in the event of avoiding relegation. However, their initial goals were far surpassed, finishing 6th and making its maiden qualification for European competition.

Other notable achievements this season include a win at home against Real Madrid, sparking a seven-game winning streak — the club's longest in the First Division of Spanish football — which led to the top table for the first time in the club's history, after a 0-3 win at Villarreal.

Levante competed in the 2011–12 La Liga and the 2011–12 Copa del Rey where they entered in the Round of 32.

== Squad ==
=== Squad information ===
Updated 26 January 2012

No.	Nationality	Name	Date of birth (age)	Signed in	Signed from	Apps.	Goals	Notes
Goalkeepers
1	(Uruguay)	Gustavo Munúa	27 January 1978 (age 48)	2010	Málaga	24	0	
13	(Costa Rica)	Keylor Navas	15 December 1986 (age 39)	2011	Albacete	0	0	On loan
Defenders
3	(Spain)	Nano	7 July 1980 (age 46)	2010	Betis	34	3	
5	(Spain)	Héctor Rodas	7 March 1988 (age 38)	2009	Youth system	31	2	
11	(Brazil)	Pedro Botelho	14 December 1989 (age 36)	2012	(England) Arsenal	0	0	On loan
12	(Spain)	Juanfran	15 July 1976 (age 50)	2010	(Greece) AEK Athens	44	0	
15	(Spain)	Asier del Horno	19 January 1981 (age 45)	2011	Valencia	22	2	
17	(Spain)	Javi Venta	13 December 1975 (age 50)	2010	Villarreal	35	0	
18	(Spain)	Sergio Ballesteros (C)	4 September 1975 (age 51)	2008	Mallorca	113	2	
19	(Spain)	Pedro López	1 November 1983 (age 43)	2011	Valladolid	1	0	
22	(Argentina)	Gustavo Cabral	14 October 1985 (age 41)	2011	(Argentina) Arsenal de Sarandí	0	0	On loan
Midfielders
4	(Spain)	Javier Farinós	29 March 1978 (age 48)	2011	Hércules	1	0	
6	(Spain)	Miguel Pallardó	5 September 1986 (age 40)	2008	Getafe	86	2	
7	(Spain)	José Barkero	27 April 1979 (age 47)	2011	Numancia	6	1	
10	(Spain)	Vicente Iborra	16 January 1988 (age 38)	2008	Youth system	99	5	
14	(Spain)	Xavi Torres	27 November 1986 (age 39)	2010	Málaga	37	0	On loan
16	(Spain)	Marc Mateu	16 June 1990 (age 36)	2008	Youth system	12	0	
20	(Spain)	Juanlu	8 May 1980 (age 46)	2009	Betis	70	14	
23	(Cape Verde)	Valdo	23 April 1981 (age 45)	2010	Espanyol	31	2	
Forwards
2	(Ivory Coast)	Arouna Koné	11 November 1983 (age 42)	2011	Sevilla	5	1	On loan
8	(Spain)	Óscar Serrano	30 September 1981 (age 45)	2012	Racing Santander	0	0	
9	(Spain)	Rafa Jordà	11 January 1984 (age 42)	2010	Hércules	34	7	
21	(Spain)	Rubén Suárez	19 February 1979 (age 47)	2008	Elche	96	30	
24	(Spain)	Carlos Aranda	27 July 1980 (age 46)	2011	Osasuna	2	0	
25	(Morocco)	Nabil El Zhar	27 August 1986 (age 40)	2011	(England) Liverpool	2	0	

=== Transfers ===
==== In ====
Pos	Player	From	Type	Source
GK	(Costa Rica) Keylor Navas	Albacete	Loan	LevanteUD.com
DF	(Argentina) Gustavo Cabral	(Argentina) Arsenal de Sarandí	Loan	LevanteUD.com
DF	(Spain) Asier del Horno	Valencia	Transfer	LevanteUD.com
DF	(Spain) Pedro López	Valladolid	Transfer	LevanteUD.com
MF	(Spain) Javier Farinós	Hércules	Transfer	LevanteUD.com
MF	(Spain) Miguel Pallardó	Getafe	Transfer	LevanteUD.com
MF	(Spain) José Barkero	Numancia	Transfer	LevanteUD.com
MF	(Spain) Marc Mateu	Badajoz	Loan return	
FW	(Ecuador) Felipe Caicedo	(England) Manchester City	Transfer	LevanteUD.com
FW	(Spain) Carlos Aranda	Osasuna	Transfer	LevanteUD.com
FW	(Morocco) Nabil El Zhar	(England) Liverpool	Transfer	LevanteUD.com
FW	(Brazil) Pedro Botelho	(England) Arsenal	Loan	LevanteUD.com
FW	(Spain) Óscar Serrano	Racing Santander	Free	LevantedUD.com

==== Out ====
Pos	Player	To	Type	Source
FW	(Ecuador) Felipe Caicedo	(Russia) Lokomotiv Moscow	Transfer	LevanteUD.com
DF	(Spain) Cerra	Córdoba	Transfer	
MF	(Spain) Gorka Larrea	Numancia	Transfer	
GK	(Spain) Manolo Reina	Cartagena	Transfer	
FW	(Brazil) Wellington Silva	(England) Arsenal	Loan return	

== Statistics ==
=== Team Stats ===
No.	Pos	Nat	Player	Total		La Liga		Copa del Rey	
No.	Pos	Nat	Player	Apps	Goals	Apps	Goals	Apps	Goals
1	GK	(Uruguay) URU	Gustavo Munúa	19	0	18	0	1	0
13	GK	(Costa Rica) CRC	Keylor Navas	4	0	0	0	4	0
3	DF	(Spain) ESP	Nano	18	2	16	2	2	0
5	DF	(Spain) ESP	Héctor Rodas	1	0	0	0	1	0
11	DF	(Brazil) BRA	Pedro Botelho	1	0	0	0	1	0
12	DF	(Spain) ESP	Juanfran	16	0	15	0	1	0
15	DF	(Spain) ESP	Asier del Horno	9	0	7	0	2	0
17	DF	(Spain) ESP	Javi Venta	18	0	15	0	3	0
18	DF	(Spain) ESP	Sergio Ballesteros	20	2	18	1	2	1
19	DF	(Spain) ESP	Pedro López	11	0	8	0	3	0
22	DF	(Argentina) ARG	Gustavo Cabral	6	0	1	0	5	0
28	DF	(Spain) ESP	Iván López	2	0	0	0	2	0
30	DF	(Spain) ESP	José Higón	4	0	1	0	3	0
4	MF	(Spain) ESP	Javier Farinós	13	0	13	0	0	0
6	MF	(Spain) ESP	Miguel Pallardó	10	0	5	0	5	0
7	MF	(Spain) ESP	José Barkero	20	4	17	3	3	1
10	MF	(Spain) ESP	Vicente Iborra	21	1	16	0	5	1
14	MF	(Spain) ESP	Xavi Torres	19	1	17	1	2	0
16	MF	(Spain) ESP	Marc Mateu	0	0	0	0	0	0
20	MF	(Spain) ESP	Juanlu	16	6	14	6	2	0
23	MF	(Cape Verde) CPV	Valdo	18	2	17	2	1	0
2	FW	(Ivory Coast) CIV	Arouna Koné	21	7	17	6	4	1
8	FW	(Spain) ESP	Óscar Serrano	1	0	0	0	1	0
9	FW	(Spain) ESP	Rafa Jordà	3	0	0	0	3	0
21	FW	(Spain) ESP	Rubén Suárez	22	6	17	4	5	2
24	FW	(Spain) ESP	Carlos Aranda	12	1	10	0	2	1
25	FW	(Morocco) MAR	Nabil El Zhar	13	1	9	0	4	1
34	FW	(Spain) ESP	Roger	4	1	1	0	3	1

Updated 27 January.

=== Discipline ===
No.	Pos	Player	Yellow card	Yellow-red card	Red card
1	GK	(Uruguay) Gustavo Munúa	3	0	0
13	GK	(Costa Rica) Keylor Navas	1	0	0
3	DF	(Spain) Nano	6	0	1
5	DF	(Spain) Héctor Rodas	1	1	0
11	DF	(Brazil) Pedro Botelho	1	0	0
12	DF	(Spain) Juanfran	3	1	1
15	DF	(Spain) Asier del Horno	4	0	0
17	DF	(Spain) Javi Venta	6	0	0
18	DF	(Spain) Sergio Ballesteros	7	0	0
19	DF	(Spain) Pedro López	2	0	0
22	DF	(Argentina) Gustavo Cabral	1	0	0
4	MF	(Spain) Javier Farinós	3	0	0
6	MF	(Spain) Miguel Pallardó	1	0	0
7	MF	(Spain) José Barkero	6	0	0
10	MF	(Spain) Vicente Iborra	7	0	0
14	MF	(Spain) Xavi Torres	5	0	0
16	MF	(Spain) Marc Mateu	0	0	0
20	MF	(Spain) Juanlu	6	0	0
23	MF	(Cape Verde) Valdo	3	0	0
2	FW	(Ivory Coast) Arouna Koné	2	0	0
8	FW	(Spain) Óscar Serrano	1	1	0
9	FW	(Spain) Rafa Jordà	0	0	0
21	FW	(Spain) Rubén Suárez	3	0	0
24	FW	(Spain) Carlos Aranda	1	0	0
25	FW	(Morocco) Nabil El Zhar	3	0	0

Updated 29 January

== Competitions ==
=== Pre-season ===
Kickoff times are in CET.

23 July 2011 Friendly	Cercle Brugge (Belgium)	1–1	(Spain) Levante	Bruges, Belgium
17:00	D'haene 37'	Report	Barkero 9'	Stadium: Jan Breydel Stadium; Referee: Brinckman Jurgen (Belgium)

24 July 2011 Friendly	Lierse (Belgium)	2–6	(Spain) Levante	Lier, Belgium
13:00	Torres 21' (o.g.); Wesley 61' (pen.)	Report	Welington 15'; Torres 27'; Jordà 36', 83', 88'; Farinós 51'	Stadium: Herman Vanderpoortenstadion; Referee: Stevens Valere (Belgium)

26 July 2011 Friendly	NAC Breda (Netherlands)	0–0	(Spain) Levante	Breda, Netherlands
19:00				Stadium: Rat Verlegh Stadion; Referee: Maarten Ketting (Netherlands)
Note: Match suspended in the 57th minute due to a brawl between players.

30 July 2011 Friendly	Teruel (Spain)	3–2	(Spain) Levante	Teruel, Spain
14:00	Chirri 14'; Carlos David 45'; Monforte 54' (pen.)	Report	Barkero 23' (pen.), 37'	Stadium: Pinilla; Referee: Luis López Muñoz (Aragon)

2 August 2011 Trofeo Ágora	Levante (Spain)	0–2	(Uruguay) Peñarol	Valencia, Spain
15:45		Report	Palacios 44'; Silvia 81'	Stadium: Ciutat de València; Referee: Barberá Fuentes (Valencian Community)

5 August 2011 Friendly	Bolton Wanderers (England)	0–1	(Spain) Levante	Bolton, England
21:00		Report	Iborra 79'	Stadium: Reebok Stadium; Attendance: 5,172; Referee: John Moss (England)

9 August 2011 Friendly	Albacete (Spain)	1–1	(Spain) Levante	Albacete, Spain
15:30	Calle 29' (pen.)	Report	Suárez 65'	Stadium: Carlos Belmonte; Referee: Luis Collado López (Castile-La Mancha)

12 August 2011 Friendly	Parma (Italy)	1–0	(Spain) Levante	Parma, Italy
14:45	Pellè 30'	Report		Stadium: Stadio Ennio Tardini; Attendance: 2,245; Referee: Brighi di Cesena (Italy)

=== La Liga ===
==== League table ====
Pos	Team	Pld	W	D	L	GF	GA	GD	Pts	Qualification or relegation
4	Málaga	38	17	7	14	54	53	+1	58	Qualification for the Champions League play-off round
5	Atlético Madrid	38	15	11	12	53	46	+7	56	Qualification for the Europa League group stage (Note: Atlético Madrid won the 2011–12 UEFA Europa League and thus secured the title holder spot in the group stage of the 2012–13 UEFA Europa League.)
6	Levante	38	16	7	15	54	50	+4	55	Qualification for the Europa League play-off round (Note: Athletic Bilbao qualified for the third qualifying round of the 2012–13 UEFA Europa League as runners-up of the 2011–12 Copa del Rey to Barcelona, who have qualified for the 2012–13 UEFA Champions League. Consequently, Levante entered the play-off round.)
7	Osasuna	38	13	15	10	44	61	−17	54	
8	Mallorca	38	14	10	14	42	46	−4	52	

Source: ESPN
Rules for classification: 1st points; 2nd head-to-head points; 3rd head-to-head goal difference; 4th head-to-head goals scored; 5th goal difference; 6th number of goals scored; 7th Fair-play points

==== Results summary ====
Overall								Home						Away					
Pld	W	D	L	GF	GA	GD	Pts	W	D	L	GF	GA	GD	W	D	L	GF	GA	GD
38	16	8	14	55	50	+5	56	11	3	5	33	19	+14	5	5	9	22	31	−9

Last updated: 13 May 2012.
Source: Competitive Matches

==== Results by round ====
Round	1	2	3	4	5	6	7	8	9	10	11	12	13	14	15	16	17	18	19	20	21	22	23	24	25	26	27	28	29	30	31	32	33	34	35	36	37	38
Ground	H	A	A	H	A	H	A	H	A	H	A	H	A	H	A	H	A	H	A	A	H	H	A	H	A	H	A	H	A	H	A	H	A	H	A	H	A	H
Result	D	D	D	W	W	W	W	W	W	W	L	L	L	W	L	W	L	D	L	L	L	D	L	L	W	W	L	W	W	L	D	W	L	L	D	W	L	W
Position	4	9	11	8	6	3	2	2	1	1	3	4	4	4	4	4	4	4	4	6	4	4	4	7	4	4	4	4	4	4	4	4	5	5	5	6	6	6

Source: La Liga
A = Away; H = Home; W = Win; D = Draw; L = Loss

==== Matches ====
Kickoff times are in CET.

21 August 2011 1	Levante	v	Zaragoza	Valencia
--:--				Stadium: Ciutat de València
Note: Postponed due to AFE strike after failing to reach a collective bargaining agreement with the LFP.

28 August 2011 2	Getafe	1–1	Levante	Getafe
18:00	Rodríguez (yellow card) 39'; Lopo (yellow card) 45'; Miku 62'; Torres (yellow card) 68'; Lacen (yellow card) 86'; Sarabia (yellow card) 90+1'	Report	Suárez (yellow card) 44'; Juanfran (yellow card) 45'; Juanlu 77'; Barkero (yellow card) 90+3'	Stadium: Coliseum Alfonso Pérez; Attendance: 7,000; Referee: Ignacio Iglesias Villanueva (Galicia)

11 September 2011 3	Racing Santander	0–0	Levante	Santander
16:00	Osmar (yellow card) 45'; Kouli Diop (yellow card) 52' (yellow-red card) 81'; Acosta (yellow card) 63'	Report	Iborra (yellow card) 59'; Barkero (yellow card) 73'	Stadium: El Sardinero; Attendance: 10,500; Referee: Alberto Undiano Mallenco (Navarre)

18 September 2011 4	Levante	1–0	Real Madrid	Valencia
20:00	Valdo (yellow card) 38'; Juanlu (yellow card) 39'; Ballesteros (yellow card) 40'; Venta (yellow card) 43'; Koné 68'; Torres (yellow card) 78'; Suárez (yellow card) 81'; Pallardó (yellow card) 87'; Munúa (yellow card) 90+4'	Report	Khedira (yellow card) 25' (yellow-red card) 40'; Di María (yellow card) 39'; Pepe (yellow card) 78'; Coentrão (yellow card) 90+4'	Stadium: Ciutat de València; Attendance: 25,354; Referee: Javier Turienzo Álvarez (Castile and León)

21 September 2011 5	Rayo Vallecano	1–2	Levante	Vallecas
20:00	Delibašić (yellow card) 39'; Piti (yellow card) 47'; Tamudo 72'; Botelho (red card) 77'	Report	Valdo 10'; P. López (yellow card) 25'; Ballesteros 29'; Munúa (yellow card) 88'	Stadium: Teresa Rivero; Attendance: 14,015; Referee: Carlos Clos Gómez (Aragon)

25 September 2011 6	Levante	3–1	Espanyol	Valencia
16:00	Suárez 14' (pen.), 58' (pen.); Juanlu (yellow card) 53'; Barkero 76'	Report	Fonte (yellow card) 13'; Forlín (yellow card) 39'; Amat (red card) 57'; Moreno 73'; Pandiani (red card) 81'; S. García (yellow card) 85'; Márquez (yellow card) 86'	Stadium: Ciutat de València; Attendance: 10,398; Referee: Miguel Pérez Lasa (Basque Country)

2 October 2011 7	Real Betis	0–1	Levante	Seville
16:00	Pereira (yellow card) 46'; Iriney (yellow card) 72'	Report	Venta (yellow card) 24'; Nano (yellow card) 28'; Juanlu 33', (yellow card) 45+3'; Barkero (yellow card) 58'	Stadium: Benito Villamarín; Attendance: 22,000; Referee: José González González (Castile and León)

16 October 2011 8	Levante	3–0	Málaga	Valencia
18:00	Barkero 14', (yellow card) 17'; Nano (yellow card) 21'; Juanlu 30', (yellow card) 39'; Koné 41'	Report	Caballero (red card) 27'	Stadium: Ciutat de València; Attendance: 13,108; Referee: César Muñiz Fernández (Asturias)

23 October 2011 9	Villarreal	0–3	Levante	Villarreal
22:00	Ruben (yellow card) 72'; Rossi (yellow card) 76'	Report	Torres (yellow card) 22'; Juanlu 16', 43'; Koné 58'	Stadium: El Madrigal; Attendance: 18,900; Referee: Carlos Delgado Ferreiro (Basque Country)

26 October 2011 10	Levante	3–2	Real Sociedad	Valencia
22:00	Koné (yellow card) 19'; Valdo (yellow card) 38', (goal) 69'; Nano 56'; Suárez 90+3'; Juanfran (red card) 90+4'	Report	Estrada 4'; De la Bella (yellow card) 77'; I. Martínez 86'	Stadium: Ciutat de València; Attendance: 12,347; Referee: Ignacio Iglesias Villanueva (Galicia)
Note: Juanfran was sent off after being substituted.

30 October 2011 11	Osasuna	2–0	Levante	Pamplona
16:00	Cejudo 40', (yellow card) 41' (yellow-red card) 59'; Nino 44'; García (yellow card) 62'	Report	Iborra (yellow card) 49'; Del Horno (yellow card) 83'; Valdo (yellow card) 87'	Stadium: Reyno de Navarra; Attendance: 15,399; Referee: Eduardo Iturralde González (Basque Country)

5 November 2011 12	Levante	0–2	Valencia	Valencia
22:00	Iborra (yellow card) 36'; Ballesteros (yellow card) 40'; Munúa (yellow card) 40'; Torres (yellow card) 42'; Nano (yellow card) 49'; Aranda (yellow card) 62'	Report	Venta 31' (o.g.); Alba (yellow card) 38'; T. Costa 50'; Rami (yellow card) 51'; Piatti (yellow card) 90+2'	Stadium: Ciutat de València; Attendance: 19,114; Referee: del Cerro Grande (Community of Madrid)

20 November 2011 13	Atlético Madrid	3–2	Levante	Madrid
20:00	Turan (yellow card) 15'; Adrián (yellow card) 40', (goal) 74'; Domínguez (yellow card) 52'; Pizzi 68'; Diego 83'	Report	El Zhar (yellow card) 34'; Torres 72'; Iborra (yellow card) 89'; Suárez 90+2'	Stadium: Vicente Calderón; Attendance: 27,000; Referee: Pérez Montero (Andalusia)

27 November 2011 14	Levante	4–0	Sporting Gijón	Valencia
16:00	Barkero 20', (yellow card) 70'; Juanlu (yellow card) 42', (goal) 47'; Venta (yellow card) 44'; Koné 52', 62'	Report	Botía (yellow card) 28'; Novo (yellow card) 66'	Stadium: Ciutat de València; Attendance: 11,287; Referee: Paradas Romero (Andalusia)

3 December 2011 15	Barcelona	5–0	Levante	Barcelona
20:00	Fàbregas 3', 32', (yellow card) 45'; Cuenca 36'; Messi 53'; Sánchez 59'; Valdés (yellow card) 90'	Report	Venta (yellow card) 26'; Ballesteros (yellow card) 32'; Del Horno (yellow card) 42'	Stadium: Camp Nou; Attendance: 79,361; Referee: Teixeira Vitienes (Cantabria)

10 December 2011 16	Levante	1–0	Sevilla	Valencia
18:00	Juanlu (yellow card) 45+2'; Nano 56'; Ballesteros (yellow card) 62'	Report	Trochowski (yellow card) 39'; Navarro (yellow card) 45+2'; Navas (yellow card) 74'; Spahić (yellow card) 90+2'	Stadium: Ciutat de València; Attendance: 11,131; Referee: Alvarez Izquierdo (Catalan)

18 December 2011 17	Granada	2–1	Levante	Granada
16:00	Siqueira 35' (pen.); Abel 45'; Jara (yellow card) 74'	Report	Venta (yellow card) 32'; Barkero (yellow card) 33'; Juanfran (yellow card) 39'; Koné 60'; Farinós (yellow card) 80'; Nano (yellow card) 90+2' (red card) 90+5'	Stadium: Los Cármenes; Attendance: 15,000; Referee: Carlos del Cerro Grande (Community of Madrid)

7 January 2012 18	Levante	0–0	Mallorca	Valencia
18:00	P. López (yellow card) 24'; Farinós (yellow card) 68'	Report	Pina (yellow card) 57'; Cendrós (yellow card) 62'; Pereira (yellow card) 90+4'	Stadium: Ciutat de València; Attendance: 10,660; Referee: Undiano Mallenco (Navarre)

15 January 2012 19	Athletic Bilbao	3–0	Levante	Bilbao
18:00	Amorebieta 11'; Llorente 40'; Aurtenetxe (yellow card) 46'; Herrera (yellow card) 64'; San José 90'	Report	Torres (yellow card) 21'; Juanfran (yellow card) 61' (yellow-red card) 89'; Del Horno (yellow card) 67'; Farinós (yellow card) 75'; Ballesteros (yellow card) 90+3'	Stadium: San Mamés; Attendance: 35,000; Referee: Velasco Carballo (Community of Madrid)

22 January 2012 1	Levante	0–0	Zaragoza	Valencia
20:45		Report		Stadium: Ciutat de València; Attendance: 10,065; Referee: Fernández Borbalán (Andalusia)

29 January 2012 21	Levante	1–2	Getafe	Valencia
16:00	Del Horno (yellow card) 86'; Suárez 90+1' (pen.)	Report	Güiza 32', (yellow card) 52'; Masilela (yellow card) 61'; Castro 82'; Lopo (red card) 90'	Stadium: Ciutat de València; Attendance: 13,230; Referee: Teixeira Vitienes (Cantabria)

4 February 2012 22	Levante	1–1	Racing Santander	Valencia
18:00	Koné 23'; Torres (yellow card) 34'; Juanfran (yellow card) 90'	Summary	González (yellow card) 38'; Arana 61'	Stadium: Ciutat de València; Attendance: 7,658; Referee: Carlos Delgado Ferreiro

12 February 2012 23	Real Madrid	4–2	Levante	Madrid
21:30	Ramos (yellow card) 36'; Ronaldo 45' (pen.), 50', 57'; Pepe (yellow card) 49'; Benzema 66'; Arbeloa (yellow card) 84'	Summary	Cabral 5'; Serrano (yellow card) 34'; Iborra (yellow card) 37' (yellow-red card) 43'; Koné 63'; Cabral (yellow card) 86'	Stadium: Santiago Bernabéu; Attendance: 71,000; Referee: Alberto Undiano Mallenco

19 February 2012 24	Levante	3–5	Rayo Vallecano	Valencia
19:45	Koné (yellow card) 41'; Farinós (yellow card) 41'; Barkero 50' (pen.) Del Horno (yellow card) 65'; Suárez 79', 90+2'; Torres (yellow card) 83'; Cabral (yellow card) 83'	Summary	Tito (yellow card) 11'; Bangoura 35', 70', (yellow card) 28'; Pulido (yellow card) 49'; Costa 62', 63', (yellow card) 67'; Delibašić 85'	Stadium: Ciutat de València; Attendance: 9,457; Referee: Eduardo Iturralde González (Basque Country)

26 February 2012 25	Espanyol	1–2	Levante	Cornellà de Llobregat
21:00	Weiss (yellow card) 51'; Uche 75'	Summary	Juanfran (yellow card) 13'; Valdo 24'; Munúa (yellow card) 52'; Barkero (yellow card) 58'; Torres (yellow card) 59'; Suárez 89'; Farinós (yellow card) 90+2'	Stadium: Cornellà-El Prat; Attendance: 20,000; Referee: Carlos del Cerro Grande

5 March 2012 26	Levante	3–1	Real Betis	Valencia
21:00	P. López (yellow card) 12'; Barkero 34'; Ballesteros (yellow card) 36'; Torres 42'; Koné 51'; Iborra (yellow card) 67'; Valdo (yellow card) 72'; Juanfran (yellow card) 85'	Summary	Molina 44'; Sevilla (yellow card) 46'; Fabricio (yellow card) 57'; Pereira (yellow card) 64'	Stadium: Ciutat de València; Attendance: 12,000; Referee: Xavier Estrada Fernández

10 March 2012 27	Málaga	1–0	Levante	Málaga
18:00	Rondón 51'	Report		Stadium: La Rosaleda

18 March 2012 28	Levante	1–0	Villarreal	Valencia
18:00	Valdo (yellow card) 14'; Venta (yellow card) 45'; Juanfran (yellow card) 85'; Torres 90+2'	Summary	Zapata (yellow card) 6'; Castellani (yellow card) 45+1'; Martinuccio (yellow card) 75'; Pérez (yellow card) 84'; Nilmar (yellow card) 86'; Marchena (yellow card) 89' (yellow-red card) 90'	Stadium: Ciutat de València; Attendance: 14,000; Referee: Carlos Clos Gómez

21 March 2012 29	Real Sociedad	1–3	Levante	San Sebastián
20:00	Vela 6'; Elustondo (yellow card) 28' (yellow-red card) 57'; Estrada (yellow card) 53'; González (yellow card) 90+1'	Summary	Barkero 12' (pen.) (yellow card) 85'; Navarro (yellow card) 41'; Koné 45'; Farinós (yellow card) 54'; Botelho (yellow card) 59'; P. López (yellow card) 76'; Juanfran (yellow card) 77'; Torres 90+4'	Stadium: Anoeta; Attendance: 20,722; Referee: Alfonso Álvarez Izquierdo

25 March 2012 30	Levante	0–2	Osasuna	Valencia
16:00	Torres (yellow card) 62'; Venta (yellow card) 70'	Summary	García 16' (yellow card) 59'; Nino 79'; Rovérsio (yellow card) 83'	Stadium: Ciutat de València; Attendance: 9,000; Referee: Carlos del Cerro Grande

1 April 2012 31	Valencia	1–1	Levante	Valencia
18:00	Feghouli (yellow card) 18'; Hernández (yellow card) 25'; Parejo (yellow card) 34'; Jonas 35'; Aduriz (yellow card) 90+4'	Summary	Cabral (yellow card) 25'; Juanfran (yellow card) 52'; Koné 54'; Barkero (yellow card) 66'	Stadium: Mestalla; Attendance: 40,000; Referee: David Fernández Borbalán

8 April 2012 32	Levante	2–0	Atlético Madrid	Valencia
16:00	Valdo 1', (yellow card) 86'; Koné 9', (yellow card) 41'; Ballesteros (yellow card) 34'; Juanfran (yellow card) 45'	Summary	Turan (yellow card) 34'; Diego (yellow card) 34'; Salvio (yellow card) 49'; Suárez (yellow card) 68'; Miranda (yellow card) 72' (yellow-red card) 83'; Gabi (yellow card) 90+4'	Stadium: Ciutat de València; Attendance: 12,000; Referee: Ignacio Iglesias

11 April 2012 33	Sporting Gijón	3–2	Levante	Gijón
20:00	Trejo 22'; Lora (yellow card) 30', (goal) 74'; Barral (yellow card) 37'; Botía (yellow card) 51'; Órfila (yellow card) 62'; Cases (yellow card) 78'; Sangoy 84'	Summary	Valdo 16'; Koné 63'	Stadium: El Molinón; Attendance: 16,000; Referee: Miguel Pérez Lasa

14 April 2012 34	Levante	1–2	Barcelona	Valencia
22:00	Barkero 23' (pen.); Botelho (yellow card) 45'; Iborra (yellow card) 67'; Cabral (yellow card) 69'; Valdo (yellow card) 70'; Juanfran (yellow card) 71'	Summary	Busquets (yellow card) 23'; Adriano (yellow card) 39'; Messi 64', 72' (pen.)	Stadium: Ciutat de València; Attendance: 25,000; Referee: José Antonio Teixeira Vitienes

21 April 2012 35	Sevilla	1–1	Levante	Seville
22:30	Escudé (yellow card) 20'; Negredo 21'; Medel (yellow card) 40'; Manu (yellow card) 89'	Summary	Iborra (yellow card) 19'; Koné 29', (yellow card) 29'; Venta (yellow card) 86'; Valdo (yellow card) 89'; El Zhar (yellow card) 90+3'	Stadium: Ramón Sánchez Pizjuán; Attendance: 28,000; Referee: Carlos Velasco Carballo

28 April 2012 36	Levante	3–1	Granada	València
18:00 CET (UTC+01)	Koné 46', (yellow card) 47'; Torres 73'; Valdo 84'	Summary	Geijo (yellow card) 45+2'; López (yellow card) 50'; Ighalo 67'; Júlio César (yellow card) 83'	Stadium: Ciutat de València; Attendance: 15,000; Referee: José Luis González González

2 May 2012 20	Zaragoza	1–0	Levante	Zaragoza
20:00 CET (UTC+01)	Oriol 11'; Álvarez (yellow card) 27'; Lafita (yellow card) 61'; Postiga (yellow card) 78'; Roberto (yellow card) 86'; García (yellow card) 86'	Summary	Iborra (yellow card) 55'; Cabral (yellow card) 73'; Botelho (yellow card) 78'; Valdo (yellow card) 88'; Torres (yellow card) 90+3'	Stadium: La Romareda; Attendance: 28,000; Referee: Xavier Estrada Fernández

5 May 2012 37	Mallorca	1–0	Levante	Palma
21:00 CET (UTC+01)	Pina 54'; Pereira (yellow card) 90+3'	Summary	Iborra (yellow card) 60'; Munúa (yellow card) 83'; Botelho (yellow card) 90+4'	Stadium: Son Moix; Attendance: 19,000; Referee: Ignacio Iglesias

13 May 2012 38	Levante	3–0	Athletic Bilbao	Valencia
20:00 CET (UTC+01)	Ghezzal (yellow card) 45', (goal) 45', 67'; Farinós 88' (pen.)	Report	Amorebieta (yellow card) 87'	Stadium: Ciutat de València; Attendance: 12,000; Referee: Carlos Clos Gómez

=== Copa del Rey ===
Kickoff times are in CET.

==== Round of 32 ====
13 December 2011 First Leg	Deportivo	3–1	Levante	A Coruña
21:00	Álvarez 13'; Saúl 36', 80'; Vázquez (yellow card) 90+2'	Report	Rodas (yellow card) 73' (yellow-red card) 84'; Aranda 78'	Stadium: Riazor; Attendance: 9,000; Referee: Xavier Estrada Fernández (Catalan)

21 December 2011 Second Leg	Levante	4–1 (a.e.t.) (5–4 agg.)	Deportivo	Valencia
21:00	El Zhar 14', (yellow card) 118'; Ballesteros 38', (yellow card) 40'; Suárez 80', (yellow card) 94'; Koné 101'; Navas (yellow card) 110'	Report	Álvarez 24' (pen.), (yellow card) 26'; Saúl (yellow card) 32' (yellow-red card) 36'; Bodipo (yellow card) 40'; Lux (yellow card) 55'; Borja (yellow card) 60' (yellow-red card) 119'; Aythami (yellow card) 69'; Seoane (yellow card) 104'; Valerón (yellow card) 110'	Stadium: Ciutat de València; Attendance: 8,500; Referee: José Paradas Romero (Andalusia)

==== Round of 16 ====
3 January 2012 First Leg	Alcorcón	2–1	Levante	Alcorcón
21:00	Borja 13', (yellow card) 36'; Expósito (yellow card) 33'; Nagore 52'; Rueda (yellow card) 59'	Report	Pallardó 24'; Nano (yellow card) 37'; El Zhar (yellow card) 76'; Iborra (yellow card) 77'; Cabral (yellow card) 87'; Koné (yellow card) 90+3'	Stadium: Santo Domingo; Attendance: 2,000; Referee: Pedro Pérez Montero (Andalusia)

11 January 2012 Second Leg	Levante	4–0 (5–2 agg.)	Alcorcón	Valencia
20:00	Barkero 23'; Roger 45'; Iborra 52', (yellow card) 63'; Nano (yellow card) 54'; Suárez 66'; Venta (yellow card) 90'	Report	Abraham (yellow card) 32'; Mora (yellow card) 50'; Babin (yellow card) 77'; Miguélez (yellow card) 80'; Riera (yellow card) 86'	Stadium: Ciutat de València; Attendance: 10,000; Referee: Álvarez Izquierdo (Catalonia)

==== Quarter-finals ====
19 January 2012 First Leg	Valencia	4–1	Levante	Valencia
21:30	Jonas 24', (yellow card) 82'; Soldado 31', (yellow card) 73'; Piatti 45+2'; Feghouli (yellow card) 74'; Alves (yellow card) 83'; T. Costa (yellow card) 90+3', (goal) 90+4'	Report	Torres (yellow card) 33'; Koné 37'; Cabral (yellow card) 54'; Roger (yellow card) 56'; El Zhar (yellow card) 79'; Juanfran (yellow card) 80'; Iborra (yellow card) 90+1'	Stadium: Mestalla; Attendance: 40,000; Referee: José Paradas Romero (Andalusia)

26 January 2012 Second Leg	Levante	0–3 (1–7 agg.)	Valencia	Valencia
21:30	Botelho (yellow card) 22'; Serrano (yellow card) 38' (yellow-red card) 72'; Ballesteros (yellow card) 45+1'; Del Horno (yellow card) 57'; Iborra (yellow card) 60'; Torres (yellow card) 87'	Report	Aduriz 25'; Piatti 30', 85'; Banega (yellow card) 74'	Stadium: Ciutat de València; Attendance: 12,100; Referee: Ignacio Iglesias Villanueva (Galicia)
