= 2011–12 Málaga CF season =

Málaga
2011–12 season
- President: Sheikh Abdullah Al Thani
- Manager: Manuel Pellegrini
- Stadium: La Rosaleda
- La Liga: 4th
- Copa del Rey: Round of 16
- Top goalscorer: League: Salomón Rondón (11); All: Salomón Rondón (11)
- Highest home attendance: 30,000
- Lowest home attendance: 6,000

The 2011–12 season was the 80th season in Málaga CF's history and their 31st season in La Liga, the top division of Spanish football. It covers a period from 1 July 2011 to 30 June 2012.

Málaga competed for an ambitious run in La Liga and entered the Copa del Rey in the Round of 32.

== Players ==
=== Squad information ===
The numbers are established according to the official website:www.malagacf.es and www.lfp.es

Updated 29 April 2012

N	Pos.	Nat.	Name	Age	EU	Since	App	Goals	Ends	Transfer fee	Notes
1	GK	(Spain)	Rubén Martínez	28	EU	2010	10	0	2014	€1.25M	
2	RB	(Spain)	Jesús Gámez (VC)	27	EU	2005	208	1	2014	Youth system	
3	CB	(Brazil)	Weligton (captain)	32	Non-EU	2007	141	6	2012	Free	
4	CB	(Portugal)	Hélder Rosário	32	EU	2007	68	3	2012	Free	
5	CB	(Argentina)	Martín Demichelis	31	EU	2011 (Winter)	50	2	2014	€3M	Second nationality: Italy
6	DM	(Spain)	Ignacio Camacho	22	EU	2011 (Winter)	24	1	2014	€1.5M	
7	RW	(Spain)	Joaquín	30	EU	2011	21	2	2014	€4.2M	
8	DM	(France)	Jérémy Toulalan	28	EU	2011	25	3	2015	€11M	
9	CF	(Netherlands)	Ruud van Nistelrooy	35	EU	2011	24	4	2012	Free	
11	AM	(Uruguay)	Sebastián Fernández	27	EU	2010	59	12	2015	€3.6M	Second nationality: Spain
12	RW	(Spain)	Santi Cazorla	27	EU	2011	34	8	2016	€21M	
13	GK	(Argentina)	Willy Caballero	30	EU	2011 (Winter)	43	0	2016	€900K	Second nationality: Spain
14	CB	(Netherlands)	Joris Mathijsen	32	EU	2011	26	0	2013	€2.5M	
15	LB	(Spain)	Nacho Monreal	26	EU	2011	28	0	2016	€6M	
16	DM	(Italy)	Enzo Maresca	32	EU	2011 (Winter)	39	4	2012	Free	
17	LW	(Portugal)	Duda (VC)	32	EU	2008	203	30	2013	Free	
18	LW	(Portugal)	Eliseu	28	EU	2010	129	15	2014	€2M	
19	AM	(Brazil)	Júlio Baptista	30	EU	2011 (Winter)	15	10	2013	€2.5M	Second nationality: Spain
20	AM	(Argentina)	Diego Buonanotte	24	EU	2011	9	0	2016	€4.5M	Second nationality: Italy
21	RB	(Spain)	Sergio Sánchez	26	EU	2011	15	0	2015	€2.8M	
22	AM	(Spain)	Isco	22	EU	2011	29	5	2017	€6M	
23	CF	(Venezuela)	Salomón Rondón	23	Non-EU	2010	62	23	2013	€3.5M	
24	CB	(Argentina)	Javier Malagueño	29	EU	2010	0	0	2012	€945K	Second nationality: Italy
25	GK	(Cameroon)	Carlos Kameni	28	EU	2012 (Winter)	5	0	2014	Free	Second nationality: France
26	CF	(Spain)	Juanmi	19	EU	2010	28	5	2015	Youth system	
27	RM	(Spain)	Francisco Portillo	22	EU	2010	19	0	2015	Youth system	
28	CM	(Spain)	Recio	21	EU	2011	30	2	2015	Youth system	

=== Transfers ===
==== In ====
No.	Pos.	Nat.	Name	Age	EU	Moving from	Type	Transfer window	Ends	Transfer fee	Source
5	CB	(Argentina)	Martín Demichelis	30	EU	Bayern Munich (Germany)	Transfer	Summer	2014	€3M	Zonamalaguista.com
9	ST	(Netherlands)	Ruud van Nistelrooy	34	EU	Hamburg (Germany)	Transfer	Summer	2012	Free	Marca.com
15	LB	(Spain)	Nacho Monreal	25	EU	Osasuna	Transfer	Summer	2016	€6M	Marca.com
14	CB	(Netherlands)	Joris Mathijsen	31	EU	Hamburger SV (Germany)	Transfer	Summer	2013	€1M	Diariosur.es
8	DM	(France)	Jérémy Toulalan	27	EU	Lyon (France)	Transfer	Summer	2015	€10M	AS.com
21	RB	(Spain)	Sergio Sánchez	25	EU	Sevilla	Transfer	Summer	2015	€2.8M	Marca.com
7	RW	(Spain)	Joaquín	29	EU	Valencia	Transfer	Summer	2013	€4.2M	AS.com
	DM	(Spain)	Xavi Torres	24	EU	Levante	Loan return	Summer	2013	N/A	
	RM	(Spain)	Javi López	23	EU	Ponferradina	Loan return	Summer	2013	N/A	
	RM	(Spain)	Jordi Pablo	21	EU	Cartagena	Loan return	Summer	2013	N/A	
	MF	(Spain)	Dani Toribio	22	EU	Ponferradina	Loan return	Summer	2012	N/A	
	MF	(Spain)	David González	21	EU	Cádiz	Loan return	Summer	2011	N/A	
	MF	(Spain)	Edu Ramos	19	EU	Leganés	Loan return	Summer	2012	N/A	
20	AM	(Argentina)	Diego Buonanotte	23	EU	River Plate (Argentina)	Loan return	Summer	2016	N/A	
	ST	(Portugal)	Edinho	28	EU	Marítimo (Portugal)	Loan return	Summer	2013	N/A	
22	MF	(Spain)	Isco	19	EU	Valencia	Transfer	Summer	2017	€6M	AS.com
12	MF	(Spain)	Santi Cazorla	26	EU	Villarreal	Transfer	Summer	2017	€19M	Malagacf.com
25	GK	(Cameroon)	Carlos Kameni	27	EU	Espanyol	Transfer	Winter	2014	Free	AS.com

Total expenditure: ▼€52 million

==== Out ====
No.	Pos.	Nat.	Name	Age	EU	Moving to	Type	Transfer window	Transfer fee	Source
	GK	(Spain)	Francesc Arnau	36	EU		Retirement	Summer	Free	
	DF	(Denmark)	Patrick Mtiliga	30	EU	Nordsjælland (Denmark)	End of contract	Summer	Free	
	GK	(Brazil)	Rodrigo Galatto	28	EU	Free agent	Contract cancellation	Summer	Free	Foromalaguistas.com
21	ST	(Ghana)	Quincy Owusu-Abeyie	25	EU	Al Sadd (Qatar)	Loan return	Summer	N/A	
13	GK	(Spain)	Sergio Asenjo	22	EU	Atlético Madrid	Loan return	Summer	N/A	
4	LB	(Spain)	Manu Torres	21	EU	Cartagena	Transfer	Summer	Free	Laverdad.es
20	RB	(Spain)	Manolo Gaspar	30	EU	Cartagena	Transfer	Summer	Free	Laopiniondemurcia.es
	RM	(Spain)	Javi López	23	EU	Real Jaén	Loan	Summer	N/A	AS.com
	MF	(Spain)	Daniel Toribio	22	EU	Free agent	Contract cancellation	Summer	Free	Málaga.com
	MF	(Spain)	Edu Ramos	19	EU	Villarreal B	Transfer	Summer	Free	As.com
	MF	(Spain)	David González	21	EU	Free agent	Contract cancellation	Summer	Free	Oviedista.com
22	MF	(Brazil)	Sandro Silva	27	Non-EU	Internacional (Brazil)	Loan	Summer	N/A	Malagacf.com
	MF	(Spain)	Xavi Torres	24	EU	Levante	Loan	Summer	N/A	Diariosur.es
	MF	(Spain)	Jordi Pablo	21	EU	Free agent	Contract cancellation	Summer	Free	Malagacf.com
	AM	(Spain)	Fernando	47	EU	Free agent	Contract cancellation	Summer	Free	Esfutbol.net
10	MF	(Spain)	Apoño	27	EU	Zaragoza	Loan	Winter	N/A	Eldesmarquemalaga.es
	CB	(Denmark)	Kris Stadsgaard	41	EU	Copenhagen (Denmark)	Transfer	Winter	Free	Eldesmarquemalaga.es
	ST	(Portugal)	Edinho	44	EU	Académica (Portugal)	Loan	Winter	N/A	Málagacf.com

Total income: ▲€0 million

== Club ==
=== Coaching staff ===
Position	Staff
Head coach	(Chile) Manuel Pellegrini
2nd coach	(Argentina) Rubén Cousillas
Technical assistant	(Spain) Enrique Ruiz
General manager	(Spain) Fernando Hierro
Sporting Director	(Spain) Antonio Fernández
Physical trainer	(Spain) José Cabello
Goalkeepers coach	(Spain) Xabi Mancisidor
Physical readaptor	(Spain) Fernando Lacomba
Head of medical services	(Spain) Juan Carlos Pérez Frías
Masseuse	(Spain) Marcelino Torrontegui
Physiotherapists	(Spain) Luis Barbado, Hugo Camarero
Team delegate	(Spain) Vicente Valcarce
Field delegates	(Spain) Giráldez Carrasco, Miguel Zambrana, Juan Carlos Salcedo

Source: Malagacf.com

== Competitions ==
=== La Liga ===
==== League table ====
Pos	Team	Pld	W	D	L	GF	GA	GD	Pts	Qualification or relegation
2	Barcelona	38	28	7	3	114	29	+85	91	Qualification for the Champions League group stage
3	Valencia	38	17	10	11	59	44	+15	61	Qualification for the Champions League group stage
4	Málaga	38	17	7	14	54	53	+1	58	Qualification for the Champions League play-off round
5	Atlético Madrid	38	15	11	12	53	46	+7	56	Qualification for the Europa League group stage (Note: Atlético Madrid won the 2011–12 UEFA Europa League and thus secured the title holder spot in the group stage of the 2012–13 UEFA Europa League.)
6	Levante	38	16	7	15	54	50	+4	55	Qualification for the Europa League play-off round (Note: Athletic Bilbao qualified for the third qualifying round of the 2012–13 UEFA Europa League as runners-up of the 2011–12 Copa del Rey to Barcelona, who have qualified for the 2012–13 UEFA Champions League. Consequently, Levante entered the play-off round.)

Source: ESPN
Rules for classification: 1st points; 2nd head-to-head points; 3rd head-to-head goal difference; 4th head-to-head goals scored; 5th goal difference; 6th number of goals scored; 7th Fair-play points

==== Results summary ====
Overall								Home						Away					
Pld	W	D	L	GF	GA	GD	Pts	W	D	L	GF	GA	GD	W	D	L	GF	GA	GD
38	17	7	14	54	53	+1	58	13	3	3	35	21	+14	4	4	11	19	32	−13

Last updated: 13 May 2012.
Source: Competitive matches

==== Results by round ====
Round	1	2	3	4	5	6	7	8	9	10	11	12	13	14	15	16	17	18	19	20	21	22	23	24	25	26	27	28	29	30	31	32	33	34	35	36	37	38
Ground	H	A	H	A	H	A	H	A	H	A	H	A	A	H	A	H	A	H	A	A	H	A	H	A	H	A	H	A	H	A	H	H	A	H	A	H	A	H
Result	L	L	W	W	W	D	W	L	L	L	W	D	W	W	L	D	L	D	L	L	W	L	W	L	W	W	W	D	W	W	L	W	L	D	D	W	L	W
Position	10	15	8	6	3	6	4	6	6	9	6	6	5	5	6	6	7	6	8	4	8	8	7	9	6	6	4	5	5	4	4	3	4	4	4	4	4	4

Updated to match(es) played on 13 May 2012. Source: La Liga
A = Away; H = Home; W = Win; D = Draw; L = Loss

==== Matches ====
28 August 2011 2	Sevilla	2–1	Málaga	Seville
22:00 CEST	Negredo 2', 26', (yellow card) 53'; Medel (yellow card) 55'; Cáceres (yellow card) 80'	Report	Van Nistelrooy (yellow card) 29'; Cazorla 81'	Stadium: Ramón Sánchez Pizjuán; Attendance: 35,000; Referee: Carlos Delgado Ferreiro

12 September 2011 3	Málaga	4–0	Granada	Málaga
21:00 CEST	Cazorla 5', 48'; Joaquín 24', 73', (yellow card) 73'; Duda (yellow card) 50'	Report	Jara (yellow card) 55'; Martins (yellow card) 65'	Stadium: La Rosaleda; Attendance: 28,000; Referee: Miguel Ayza Gámez

17 September 2011 4	Mallorca	0–1	Málaga	Palma
18:00 CEST	Cáceres (yellow card) 44'; Flores (yellow card) 56'	Report	Cáceres 39' (o.g.); Toulalan (yellow card) 68'	Stadium: Iberostar; Attendance: 13,000; Referee: Miguel Pérez Lasa

21 September 2011 5	Málaga	1–0	Athletic Bilbao	Málaga
20:00 CEST	Cazorla 62', (yellow card) 76'	Report	Iturraspe (yellow card) 61'; Toquero (yellow card) 84'; Martínez (yellow card) 88'	Stadium: La Rosaleda; Attendance: 20,976; Referee: Fernando Teixeira Vitienes

25 September 2011 6	Zaragoza	0–0	Málaga	Zaragoza
22:00 CEST	Meira (yellow card) 66'	Report	Sánchez (yellow card) 49'	Stadium: La Romareda; Attendance: 18,000; Referee: Xavier Estrada Fernández

1 October 2011 7	Málaga	3 − 2	Getafe	Málaga
22:00 CEST	Baptista (yellow card) 18', (goal) 90+2'; Van Nistelrooy 64'; Eliseu (yellow card) 77'; Maresca 88'	Report	Pedro León (yellow card) 28', (goal) 55'; Güiza (yellow card) 40'; Lopo (yellow card) 40'; Lacen (yellow card) 41' (yellow-red card) 76'; Barrada (yellow card) 67'; Miku 75'; Rodríguez (yellow card) 89'; Ríos (yellow card) 90+4'	Stadium: La Rosaleda; Attendance: 25,000; Referee: Alfonso Álvarez Izquierdo

16 October 2011 8	Levante	3−0	Málaga	Valencia
18:00 CEST	Barkero 14', (yellow card) 17'; Nano (yellow card) 21'; Juanlu 30', (yellow card) 39'; Koné 41'	Report	Caballero (red card) 27'	Stadium: Ciutat de València; Attendance: 13,108; Referee: César Muñiz Fernández

22 October 2011 9	Málaga	0−4	Real Madrid	Málaga
20:00 CEST	Eliseu (yellow card) 25'	Report	Higuaín 11'; Ronaldo 24', 28', 38'	Stadium: La Rosaleda; Attendance: 26,000; Referee: Antonio Mateu Lahoz

26 October 2011 10	Rayo Vallecano	2−0	Málaga	Madrid
20:00 CEST	Botelho 7'; Tito (yellow card) 41'; Figueras (yellow card) 44'; Tamudo 70'	Report	Toulalan (yellow card) 29'; Eliseu (red card) 36'; Joaquín (yellow card) 81'; Gámez (yellow card) 83'	Stadium: Campo de Vallecas; Attendance: 10,000; Referee: Miguel Ayza Gámez

30 October 2011 11	Málaga	2−1	Espanyol	Málaga
22:00 CEST	Rondón 5', (yellow card) 90+4'; Apoño 73' (pen.)	Report	Weiss (yellow card) 14'; Forlín (yellow card) 19'; Galán (yellow card) 42'; Vázquez 45'; Romaric (yellow card) 72'; Álvarez (yellow card) 72'	Stadium: La Rosaleda; Attendance: 26,000; Referee: Carlos Delgado Ferreiro

5 November 2011 12	Betis	0−0	Málaga	Seville
20:00 CET	Isidoro (yellow card) 89'; Ezequiel (yellow card) 90+1'	Report	Duda (yellow card) 74'	Stadium: Benito Villamarín; Attendance: 36,000; Referee: Fernando Teixeira Vitienes

21 November 2011 13	Racing Santander	1−3	Málaga	Santander
21:00 CET	Arana (yellow card) 9', (goal) 70'; Francis (yellow card) 26'; Álvaro (yellow card) 87'	Report	Isco 48'; Toulalan (yellow card) 51'; Álvaro 65' (o.g.); Duda (yellow card) 74'; Fernández 89'	Stadium: El Sardinero; Attendance: 14,000; Referee: Eduardo Iturralde González

28 November 2011 14	Málaga	2−1	Villarreal	Málaga
21:00 CET	Toulalan 5', (yellow card) 65' (yellow-red card) 75'; Isco 40'; Caballero (yellow card) 79'; Buonanotte (yellow card) 88'	Report	Ruben 16', (yellow card) 45+2'; Ángel (yellow card) 33'; Bruno (yellow card) 35'; Rodríguez (yellow card) 72'; Pérez (yellow card) 87'	Stadium: La Rosaleda; Attendance: 25,000; Referee: Carlos Velasco Carballo

4 December 2011 15	Real Sociedad	3−2	Málaga	San Sebastián
16:00 CET	Demichelis 10' (o.g.); Griezmann (yellow card) 76'; Vela 89'; Ifrán 90+1', (yellow card) 90+2'	Report	Rondón 19'; Isco (yellow card) 24'; Monreal (yellow card) 38'; Fernández 58'; Sánchez (yellow card) 63'	Stadium: Anoeta; Attendance: 22,000; Referee: Javier Turienzo Álvarez

11 December 2011 16	Málaga	1−1	Osasuna	Málaga
18:00 CET	Sánchez (yellow card) 65'; Juanmi 69'; Joaquín (yellow card) 87'	Report	Satrústegui (yellow card) 20'; Baldé 33'	Stadium: La Rosaleda; Attendance: 22,000; Referee: Xavier Estrada Fernández

18 December 2011 17	Valencia	2−0	Málaga	Valencia
21:30 CET	Banega (yellow card) 31'; Soldado 36', 61'; Albelda (yellow card) 39'; Miguel (yellow card) 59'; Hernández (yellow card) 87'	Report	Mathijsen (yellow card) 43'; Demichelis (yellow card) 72'	Stadium: Mestalla; Attendance: 39,000; Referee: Ignacio Iglesias Villanueva

7 January 2012 18	Málaga	0−0	Atlético Madrid	Málaga
22:00 CET	Demichelis (yellow card) 58'; Sánchez (yellow card) 62'; Apoño (yellow card) 90+2'	Report	Domínguez (yellow card) 22'; Diego (yellow card) 28'; Tiago (yellow card) 60'; Falcao (yellow card) 66'; Perea (yellow card) 90'	Stadium: La Rosaleda; Attendance: 30,000; Referee: José Antonio Teixeira Vitienes

15 January 2012 19	Sporting Gijón	2−1	Málaga	Gijón
19:45 CET	Gálvez 36'; Castro (yellow card) 46'; Eguren (yellow card) 71'; Juan Pablo (yellow card) 83'; Trejo (yellow card) 85', (goal) 90+2'; Cases (yellow card) 86'	Report	Mathijsen (yellow card) 8'; Toulalan (yellow card) 11'; Isco (yellow card) 86'; Van Nistelrooy 88'	Stadium: El Molinón; Attendance: 22,000; Referee: Carlos del Cerro Grande

22 January 2012 1	Málaga	1−4	Barcelona	Málaga
18:00 CET	Camacho (yellow card) 62'; Rondón 85'	Report	Messi 32', 50', 80'; Sánchez 47'	Stadium: La Rosaleda; Attendance: 28,900; Referee: Alberto Undiano Mallenco

29 January 2012 21	Málaga	2−1	Sevilla	Málaga
21:30 CET	Weligton 8', (yellow card) 69'; Fernández (yellow card) 10', (goal) 19'; Sánchez (yellow card) 24'; Demichelis (yellow card) 35'; Isco (yellow card) 74' (yellow-red card) 79'	Report	Luna 15', (yellow card) 84'; Negredo (yellow card) 21'; Rakitić (yellow card) 44'; Spahić (yellow card) 63'; Medel (yellow card) 74'; Perotti (yellow card) 84'; Escudé (yellow card) 90'	Stadium: La Rosaleda; Attendance: 28,000; Referee: César Muñiz Fernández

6 February 2012 22	Granada	2−1	Málaga	Granada
21:00 CET	M. Rico (yellow card) 22'; Gómez (yellow card) 31'; Yebda (yellow card) 45+2'; Ighalo 57'; Nyom (yellow card) 75'; López 81'	Report	Gámez (yellow card) 13'; Rondón 68'; Demichelis (red card) 84'	Stadium: Los Cármenes; Attendance: 15,000; Referee: Antonio Mateu Lahoz

12 February 2012 23	Málaga	3−1	Mallorca	Málaga
16:00 CET	Fernández 10'; Recio (yellow card) 38'; Toulalan 54'; Rondón 67'; Weligton (yellow card) 87'	Report	Pereira 4'; Flores (yellow card) 75'; Alfaro (yellow card) 82'	Stadium: La Rosaleda; Attendance: 20,000; Referee: Miguel Ayza Gámez

19 February 2012 24	Athletic Bilbao	3−0	Málaga	Bilbao
16:00 CET	Iraola (yellow card) 15'; Herrera (yellow card) 21'; Amorebieta 57'; San José 60'; Toquero 61'; Muniain (yellow card) 65'; De Marcos (yellow card) 86'	Report	Weligton (yellow card) 21'	Stadium: San Mamés

25 February 2012 25	Málaga	5−1	Zaragoza	Málaga
20:00 CET	Fernández 45+1'; Toulalan (yellow card) 63'; Da Silva 67' (o.g.); Demichelis 77'; Isco 79'; Rondón 88'	Report	Lanzaro (yellow card) 7'; Pintér (yellow card) 15'; Aranda 23'; Álvarez (yellow card) 74'	Stadium: La Rosaleda; Attendance: 26,000; Referee: Javier Turienzo Álvarez

3 March 2012 26	Getafe	1−3	Málaga	Getafe
18:00 CET	Valera (yellow card) 32'; Castro 42'; Lacen (yellow card) 53'; Mané (yellow card) 77'	Report	Isco (yellow card) 13'; Recio (yellow card) 44'; Eliseu 57'; Toulalan 81'; Rondón (yellow card) 85'; Mathijsen (yellow card) 89'; Cazorla 90+2'	Stadium: Coliseum Alfonso Pérez; Attendance: 8,000; Referee: Alberto Undiano Mallenco

10 March 2012 27	Málaga	1−0	Levante	Málaga
18:00 CET	Rondón 51'; Fernández (yellow card) 90+1'; Duda (yellow card) 90+4'; Toulalan (yellow card) 90+5'	Report	P. López (yellow card) 29'; Del Horno (yellow card) 85'; Ballesteros (yellow card) 87'	Stadium: La Rosaleda; Attendance: 23,000; Referee: Ignacio Iglesias Villanueva

18 March 2012 28	Real Madrid	1−1	Málaga	Madrid
21:30 CET	Benzema 35'; Khedira (yellow card) 63'; Pepe (yellow card) 87'	Report	Sánchez (yellow card) 53'; Cazorla 90+2'	Stadium: Santiago Bernabéu; Attendance: 73,000; Referee: Miguel Ayza Gámez

22 March 2012 29	Málaga	4−2	Rayo Vallecano	Málaga
22:00 CET	Gámez (yellow card) 4'; Rondón 25', 58'; Maresca 69', (yellow card) 70'; Caballero (yellow card) 84'; Duda 86'	Report	Costa 5' (pen.), (yellow card) 21'; Arribas (yellow card) 11'; Tito (yellow card) 31'; Casado (yellow card) 34'; Trashorras 84' (pen.)	Stadium: La Rosaleda; Attendance: 22,000; Referee: Antonio Mateu Lahoz

25 March 2012 30	Espanyol	1−2	Málaga	Cornellà de Llobregat
16:00 CET	Coutinho 23'; Vilà (yellow card) 27'; López (yellow card) 53'; Baena (yellow card) 53'	Report	Demichelis (yellow card) 52', (goal) 77'; Van Nistelrooy 75'	Stadium: Cornellà-El Prat; Attendance: 24,000; Referee: Carlos Clos Gómez

31 March 2012 31	Málaga	0−2	Betis	Málaga
22:00 CET	Weligton (yellow card) 39'	Report	Nacho (yellow card) 34'; Castro 40'; Dorado 45+1', (yellow card) 56'; Nélson (yellow card) 67'; Fabricio (yellow card) 72'	Stadium: La Rosaleda; Attendance: 23,000; Referee: Fernando Teixeira Vitienes

9 April 2012 32	Málaga	3−0	Racing Santander	Málaga
21:00 CEST	Isco (yellow card) 16', (goal) 21'; Mathijsen (yellow card) 62'; Cazorla 64'; Van Nistelrooy 84'; Demichelis (yellow card) 90'	Report	Francis (red card) 3'; Cisma (yellow card) 55'; Diop (yellow card) 53'	Stadium: La Rosaleda; Attendance: 28,000; Referee: Carlos del Cerro Grande

12 April 2012 33	Villarreal	2−1	Málaga	Villarreal
21:00 CEST	Senna 83' (pen.); Pérez 90+4'	Report	Duda (yellow card) 33'; Eliseu (yellow card) 58'; Cazorla 65'; Kameni (red card) 81'; Camacho (yellow card) 90+3'; Van Nistelrooy (yellow card) 90+5'	Stadium: El Madrigal; Attendance: 14,000; Referee: Alfonso Álvarez Izquierdo

15 April 2012 34	Málaga	1−1	Real Sociedad	Málaga
16:00 CEST	Isco 19'; Mathijsen (yellow card) 89'; Demichelis (yellow card) 90+1'	Report	González (yellow card) 26' (yellow-red card) 45'; Prieto 48'	Stadium: La Rosaleda; Attendance: 28,000; Referee: José González González

23 April 2012 35	Osasuna	1−1	Málaga	Pamplona
21:00 CEST	Cejudo (yellow card) 12'; Nino 53'; Damià (yellow card) 83'	Report	Van Nistelrooy (yellow card) 64'; Cazorla 67'	Stadium: Reyno de Navarra; Attendance: 13,939; Referee: Carlos Delgado Ferreiro

29 April 2012 36	Málaga	1−0	Valencia	Málaga
18:00 CEST	Camacho (yellow card) 16', (goal) 27'; Demichelis (yellow card) 44'; Isco (yellow card) 47'	Report	Maduro (yellow card) 20'; Feghouli (yellow card) 42' (yellow-red card) 61'; T. Costa (yellow card) 65'; Alba (yellow card) 89'	Stadium: La Rosaleda; Attendance: 22,000; Referee: Fernando Teixeira Vitienes

2 May 2012 20	Barcelona	4−1	Málaga	Barcelona
20:00 CET	Puyol 13'; Messi 35' (pen.), 59' (pen.), 64'; Pedro (yellow card) 68'; Fàbregas (yellow card) 83'	Report	Rondón 26'; Camacho (yellow card) 57'; Duda (yellow card) 58'	Stadium: Camp Nou; Attendance: 67,854; Referee: Javier Turienzo Álvarez

5 May 2012 37	Atlético Madrid	2−1	Málaga	Madrid
21:00 CEST	Suárez (yellow card) 33'; Koke 69', (yellow card) 88'; Diego (yellow card) 73'; Tiago (yellow card) 77'; Adrián 79'; Turan (yellow card) 81'; Salvio (yellow card) 90'	Report	Eliseu 38'; Weligton (yellow card) 78'; Sánchez (yellow card) 89'	Stadium: Vicente Calderón; Attendance: 25,000; Referee: César Muñiz Fernández

13 May 2012 38	Málaga	1−0	Sporting de Gijón	Málaga
--:-- CEST	Camacho (yellow card) 28'; Cazorla (yellow card) 33'; Rondón 49'; Isco (yellow card) 70' (yellow-red card) 89'	Report	Suárez (yellow card) 24'; Menéndez (yellow card) 35'; Lora (yellow card) 53'; Gálvez (yellow card) 59'; Botía (yellow card) 71'	Stadium: La Rosaleda

=== Copa del Rey ===
==== Round of 32 ====
13 December 2011 First leg	Getafe	0−1	Málaga	Getafe
21:00 CET		Report	Juanmi 84'	Stadium: Coliseum Alfonso Pérez; Attendance: 6,000; Referee: Alberto Undiano Mallenco

21 December 2011 Second leg	Málaga	2−2 (3−2 agg.)	Getafe	Málaga
21:00 CET	Van Nistelrooy 45'; Buonanotte 86'	Report	Caballero 51' (o.g.); Mané 79'	Stadium: La Rosaleda; Attendance: 5,000; Referee: Carlos Clos Gómez

==== Round of 16 ====
3 January 2012 First leg	Real Madrid	3−2	Málaga	Madrid
22:00 CET	Khedira 67'; Higuaín 69'; Benzema 77'	Report	Sánchez 9'; Demichelis 28'	Stadium: Santiago Bernabéu; Attendance: 80,000; Referee: Fernando Teixeira Vitienes

10 January 2012 Second leg	Málaga	0−1 (2−4 agg.)	Real Madrid	Málaga
22:00 CET		Report	Benzema 72'	Stadium: La Rosaleda; Attendance: 27,000; Referee: Miguel Ángel Pérez Lasa

== Pre-season and friendlies ==
16 July 2011	Horadada	1–4	Málaga	Alicante
11:00 CEST	Muñoz 55'	Report	Duda 30'; Van Nistelrooy 64', 90'; Maiquez 84' (o.g.)	Stadium: Campoamor; Attendance: 1,000; Referee: Francisco Márquez Gordo

20 July 2011	Málaga	6–1	Al Rayyan	Marbella (Málaga)
20:00 CEST	Demichelis 12'; Buonanotte 16'; Van Nistelrooy 40'; Maresca 42'; Joaquín 52'; Toni 69'	Report	Al-Ali 47'	Stadium: Marbella Football Center; Attendance: 1,100; Referee: José Luis Paradas Romero

23 July 2011	Xerez	0–1	Málaga	Jerez de la Frontera (Cádiz)
21:30 CEST		Report	Samu 51'	Stadium: Chapín; Attendance: 16,416; Referee: Jesús Gil Manzano

27 July 2011	Utrecht	0–3	Málaga	Utrecht
19:00 CEST		Report	Duda 7'; Baptista 42'; Van Nistelrooy 75'	Stadium: Galgenwaard; Attendance: 3,500; Referee: Eric Braamhaar (Netherlands)

29 July 2011	Roda	1–2	Málaga	Kerkrade
19:30 CEST	Vuković 52'	Report	Baptista 27' (pen.); Buonanotte 90'	Stadium: Parkstad Limburg; Attendance: 5,300; Referee: Ed Janssen (Netherlands)

31 July 2011	Feyenoord	0–2	Málaga	Rotterdam
14:30 CEST		Report	Monreal 48'; Stadsgaard 86'	Stadium: De Kuip; Attendance: 50,000; Referee: Tom van Sichem (Netherlands)

5 August 2011	Málaga	3−1	Sporting CP	Cádiz
22:00 CEST	Baptista 37', 75'; Van Nistelrooy 41'	Report	Carrillo 60'	Stadium: Ramón de Carranza; Attendance: 10,000; Referee: Pedro Pérez Montero

6 August 2011	Cádiz	2−0	Málaga	Cádiz
22:00 CEST	Juanjo 76'; Dioni 90+2'	Report		Stadium: Ramón de Carranza; Attendance: 6,691; Referee: Javier Turienzo Álvarez

13 August 2011	Málaga	4−0	Peñarol	Málaga
21:30 CEST	Baptista 22'; Van Nistelrooy 43', 48'; Fernández 71'	Report		Stadium: La Rosaleda; Attendance: 16,000; Referee: José Luis Paradas Romero

30 November 2011	Málaga	0−0	Xerez	Nerja
		Report		Stadium: Campo Municipal de Nerja; Referee: José Luis Paradas Romero

15 February 2012	Málaga	2−2	Spartak Moscow	Málaga
	Portillo 23'; Maresca 34'	Report	Emenike 31', 42'	Stadium: La Rosaleda; Attendance: 5500; Referee: Mario Melero López

13 March 2012	Málaga	1−1	Djurgården	Málaga
	Buonanotte 86'		Toivio 82'	Stadium: La Rosaleda

== Statistics ==
=== Goals ===
R	Player	Position	League	Copa del Rey	Total
1	(Venezuela) Salomón Rondón	CF	11	0	11
2	(Spain) Santi Cazorla	LW	9	0	9
3	(Uruguay) Sebastián Fernández	CF	5	0	5
3	(Spain) Isco	AM	5	0	5
3	(Netherlands) Ruud van Nistelrooy	CF	4	1	5
6	(France) Jérémy Toulalan	DM	3	0	3
6	(Argentina) Martín Demichelis	CB	2	1	3
8	(Spain) Joaquín	RW	2	0	2
8	(Italy) Enzo Maresca	DM	2	0	2
8	(Portugal) Eliseu	LB	2	0	2
8	(Spain) Juanmi	CF	1	1	2
12	(Spain) Apoño	DM	1	0	1
12	(Brazil) Júlio Baptista	AM	1	0	1
12	(Brazil) Weligton	CB	1	0	1
12	(Portugal) Duda	LW	1	0	1
12	(Spain) Ignacio Camacho	DM	1	0	1
12	(Argentina) Diego Buonanotte	AM	0	1	1
12	(Spain) Sergio Sánchez	RB	0	1	1

Last updated: 13 May 2012
Source: Match reports in Competitive matches

== See also ==
- 2011–12 Copa del Rey
- 2011–12 La Liga
