= Valdo (footballer, born 1981) =

Spanish footballer (born 1981)

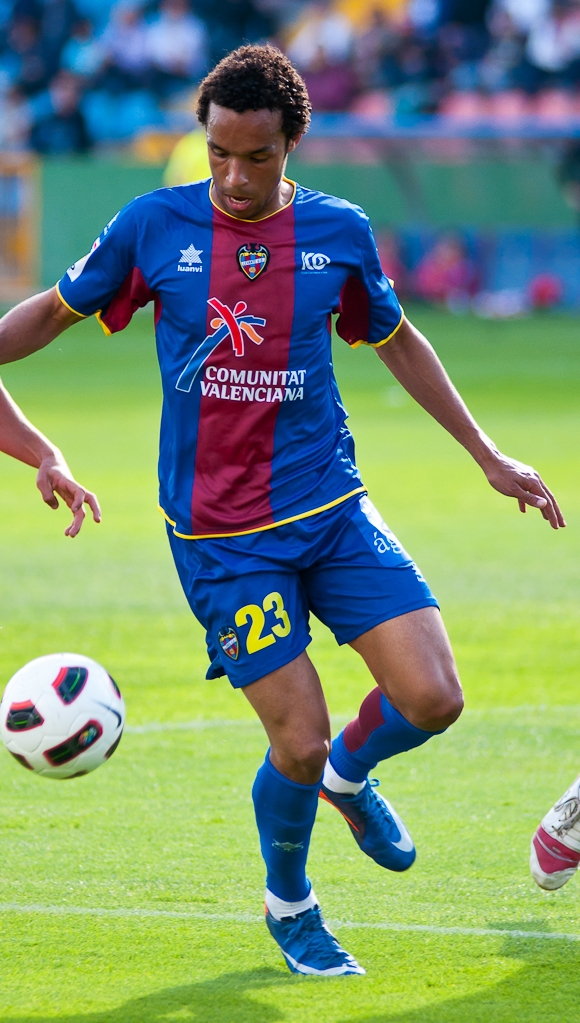
- Valdo in action for Levante in 2011

Personal information
- Full name: Valmiro Lopes Rocha
- Date of birth: 23 April 1981 (age 45)
- Place of birth: Villablino, Spain
- Height: 1.84 m (6 ft 0 in)
- Position: Winger

Youth career
- 1993–2001: Pozuelo

Senior career*
Years	Team	Apps	(Gls)
2001–2003	Real Madrid B	60	(8)
2002–2003	Real Madrid	1	(0)
2003	→ Osasuna (loan)	13	(1)
2003–2007	Osasuna	107	(18)
2007–2009	Espanyol	42	(5)
2009–2010	→ Málaga (loan)	19	(2)
2010–2012	Levante	63	(8)
2012–2013	Atlante	4	(0)
2013	→ Levante (loan)	13	(0)
2014	Asteras Tripoli	9	(0)
2015	Racing Santander	1	(0)
2015	Atlético Kolkata	9	(1)
2016–2017	Lealtad	19	(1)
2017–2018	Peña Sport	33	(6)
2019–2020	Izarra	32	(1)

International career
2003	Spain U21	6	(3)
2011	Cape Verde	2	(1)
- * Club domestic league appearances and goals as of 26 February 2020

Valmiro Lopes Rocha (born 23 April 1981), known as Valdo, is a former Cape Verdean professional footballer who played mainly as a winger.

Valdo had played for several clubs in La Liga during his professional career, notably Osasuna, Espanyol and Levante. Over 12 seasons in the competition, he appeared in 258 matches and scored 34 goals.

== Early years ==
Valdo was born in Villablino, León, in the region of Laciana, where his parents had moved after migrating from Cape Verde to work in the coal mines.

He started playing football with the amateur side CF Pozuelo de Alarcón in Madrid and stayed there for the following seven years.

A Spanish Movie, Llenos de Gracias, is loosely based on his early years and how he was discovered while playing for a local soccer team.

== Club career ==
=== Real Madrid / Osasuna ===
In 2001, Real Madrid signed him for its reserve teams. He played in 2001–02 with Real Madrid Castilla and, also during that season, received first-team opportunities in La Liga, the Copa del Rey and the UEFA Champions League, with the Merengues eventually winning the latter competition. In January 2003, Valdo moved to the league club CA Osasuna, first on loan, where he developed as a top division player, scoring five goals in 35 games in his first full season. On 11 April 2004, he scored in a 3–0 away win against his former club.

In the 2005–06 season, although he featured much less mainly due to a groin ailment, Valdo scored in a 2–1 home victory over FC Barcelona on 12 March 2006, as Osasuna qualified for the first time for the Champions League qualifying rounds. After the demotion to the UEFA Cup, he helped the team reach the last-four against Sevilla FC, scoring twice in ten matches.

=== Espanyol ===
RCD Espanyol signed Valdo at the end of 2006–07 to a four-year deal. He played his first game for the Barcelona-based side against CF Peralada during the pre-season.

On 14 July 2009, after having appeared sparingly, Valdo moved to Málaga CF in a season-long loan. After being dropped from the squad for several months due to his bad performances, he was brought back on 27 February 2010; he scored his first goal for the club against Barcelona on the same day, but Málaga lost 1–2 away at Camp Nou.

=== Levante ===
On 13 August 2010, Valdo left Espanyol and signed with Levante UD, reuniting with his Málaga teammates Gustavo Munúa and Xavi Torres. He contributed heavily during his first season – 2,119 minutes, 25 starts – as Levante retained their top-flight status, scoring against Getafe CF in a 2–0 home win and Villarreal CF for a 1–0 away victory.

Valdo was even more important in 2011–12 and scored on six occasions as Levante qualified for the Europa League for the first time ever after finishing sixth. Two of those goals near the end of the season, in home defeats of Atlético Madrid (2–0) and Granada CF (3–1).

=== Later career ===
After leaving Levante, Valdo rarely settled with a club, playing in quick succession with Asteras Tripoli in Greece, Racing de Santander of Spain and Atlético de Kolkata of the Indian Super League. On 1 September 2016, he returned to Spain to sign for CD Lealtad.

== International career ==
Valdo played for the Spanish under-21s in the early 2000s. In late August 2011, aged 30, he was called up by the Cape Verde national team for a match against Mali on 3 September, for the 2012 Africa Cup of Nations qualificatiers, and made his debut in the 0–3 away loss.

== Career statistics ==
=== Club ===
As of 8 October 2015

Club	Season	League			Cup		Other		Total	
Club	Season	Division	Apps	Goals	Apps	Goals	Apps	Goals	Apps	Goals
Real Madrid	2001–02	La Liga	1	0	0	0	2 (Note: Appearances in UEFA Champions League)	0	3	0
Real Madrid	2002–03	La Liga	0	0	1	0	0	0	1	0
Real Madrid	Total		1	0	1	0	2	0	4	0
Osasuna (loan)	2002–03	La Liga	13	1	0	0	—		13	1
Osasuna	2003–04	La Liga	35	5	1	0	—		36	5
Osasuna	2004–05	La Liga	27	5	6	2	—		33	7
Osasuna	2005–06	La Liga	19	2	0	0	2 (Note: Appearances in UEFA Cup)	0	21	2
Osasuna	2006–07	La Liga	26	6	1	0	12 (Note: Appearances in UEFA Cup and UEFA Champions League)	2	39	8
Osasuna	Total		120	19	8	2	14	2	142	23
Espanyol	2007–08	La Liga	31	4	3	0	—		34	4
Espanyol	2008–09	La Liga	11	1	5	2	—		16	3
Espanyol	Total		42	5	8	2	—		50	7
Málaga (loan)	2009–10	La Liga	19	2	3	0	—		22	2
Levante	2010–11	La Liga	29	2	4	0	—		33	2
Levante	2011–12	La Liga	34	6	1	0	—		35	6
Levante	Total		63	8	5	0	—		68	8
Atlante	2012–13	Ascenso MX	4	0	2	0	—		6	0
Levante (loan)	2012–13	La Liga	13	0	0	0	3 (Note: Appearances in UEFA Europa League)	0	16	0
Asteras Tripoli	2013–14	Super League Greece	9	0	0	0	—		9	0
Racing Santander	2014–15	Segunda División	1	0	0	0	—		1	0
Atlético Kolkata	2015	Indian Super League	2	1	—		—		2	1
Career total			274	33	27	4	19	2	320	41

=== International goals ===
#	Date	Venue	Opponent	Score	Result	Competition
1.	8 October 2011	Estádio da Várzea, Praia, Cape Verde	Zimbabwe	2–1	Win	2012 Africa Cup of Nations qualification

== Honours ==
Osasuna

- Copa del Rey runner-up: 2004–05
