= José Higón =

Spanish footballer

Personal information
- Full name: José Marco Higón
- Date of birth: 22 May 1991 (age 35)
- Place of birth: Valencia, Spain
- Height: 1.73 m (5 ft 8 in)
- Position: Winger

Youth career
- 2004–2010: Levante

Senior career*
Years	Team	Apps	(Gls)
2010–2014	Levante B	116	(18)
2010–2012	Levante	2	(0)
2014–2015	Doxa	4	(0)
2015	Alzira	9	(2)
2015	Paterna	10	(1)
2015–2016	Torrevieja	23	(6)
2016–2017	Hospitalet	33	(3)
2017	Peralada	0	(0)
2017–2018	Coruxo	40	(6)
2018–2019	Badajoz	39	(6)
2019–2020	UCAM Murcia	15	(3)
2020	Melilla	6	(1)
2020–2021	Ebro	1	(0)
2021	El Ejido		
2022	Bogotá		
2022-2023	La Unión		
2023-2024	Kilmore		
- * Club domestic league appearances and goals as of 20:18, 8 December 2020 (UTC)

José Marco Higón (born 22 May 1991) is a Spanish footballer .

== Club career ==
Born in Valencia, Higón joined local Levante UD's youth academy in 2004, aged 13. Six years later he was promoted to the reserve team, playing in Tercera División.

On 27 October 2010, Higón made his first-team debut in a Copa del Rey match against Xerez CD, starting and playing 77 minutes in a 3–2 away win (4–4 aggregate success). He first appeared in La Liga on 7 January 2012, coming on as a substitute for Nabil El Zhar for the last 12 minutes of a 0–0 home draw against RCD Mallorca.

After leaving the Estadi Ciutat de València, Higón competed exclusively in his country's lower leagues. The exception to this was in the 2014–15 season, when he appeared rarely for Cypriot First Division club Doxa Katokopias FC before returning to his homeland.
