= Óscar Serrano (footballer) =

Spanish footballer

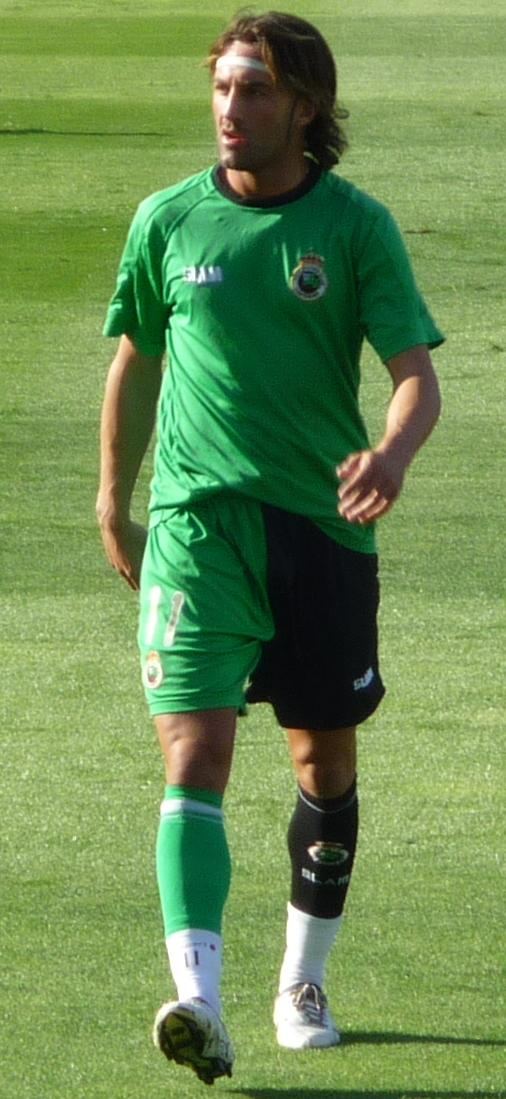
- Serrano with Racing Santander in 2009

Personal information
- Full name: Óscar Serrano Rodríguez
- Date of birth: 30 September 1981 (age 45)
- Place of birth: Blanes, Spain
- Height: 1.78 m (5 ft 10 in)
- Position: Winger

Youth career
- Blanes
- 1997–1999: Barcelona
- 1999–2000: Vilobí

Senior career*
Years	Team	Apps	(Gls)
2000–2001	Vilobí	23	(8)
2001–2002	Guixols	33	(22)
2002–2004	Figueres	58	(5)
2004–2005	Espanyol	30	(2)
2005–2012	Racing Santander	177	(13)
2012–2013	Levante	6	(0)
2013–2014	Alavés	16	(1)
Total		343	(51)

International career
2004–2010	Catalonia	7	(0)
- * Club domestic league appearances and goals

Óscar Serrano Rodríguez (born 30 September 1981) is a Spanish former professional footballer who played as a left winger.

He spent most of his career with Racing de Santander, appearing in 206 competitive matches over six and a half seasons and scoring 16 goals. In La Liga, he also played for Espanyol and Levante.

== Club career ==
Born in Blanes, Girona, Catalonia, Serrano was still playing amateur football already in his 20s but, in July 2004, he went straight out of Segunda División B club UE Figueres to La Liga with neighbouring RCD Espanyol, for only €180.000, being an important attacking element in his only season (22 starts, 1.933 minutes of action) to help the latter to finish fifth and qualify for the UEFA Cup.

Serrano signed with Racing de Santander for the 2005–06 campaign, appearing in 34 matches with three goals in his third year as the Cantabrians achieved a first ever UEFA Cup qualification. A skilled player with a volatile temperament, he was booked an average of ten times in his first four years, also being sent off in four games.

Serrano played 33 matches in 2009–10, scoring three times as Racing again retained their league status. On 25 April 2010, during a home loss against Villarreal CF, he sustained a serious anterior cruciate ligament injury which would sideline him until December; he celebrated his comeback by netting in a 1–0 away win over RCD Mallorca – in the 90th minute – having taken the pitch two minutes before, but relapsed shortly after, being limited to only four league appearances as his team again managed to stay afloat.

Upon recovering full fitness, Serrano never managed to return to starting duties again. On 24 January 2012, he terminated his contract with Racing and joined fellow top-tier side Levante UD, being sent off in his first game, a 0–3 home defeat to Valencia CF in the quarter-finals of the Copa del Rey (7–1 on aggregate).

In August 2013, following a successful trial, Serrano agreed to a contract with Deportivo Alavés in the Segunda División. He scored his only goal for the Basques on 14 December, closing the 2–1 home victory against CD Lugo.
