= Nano Rivas =

Spanish footballer and manager (born 1980)

Nano
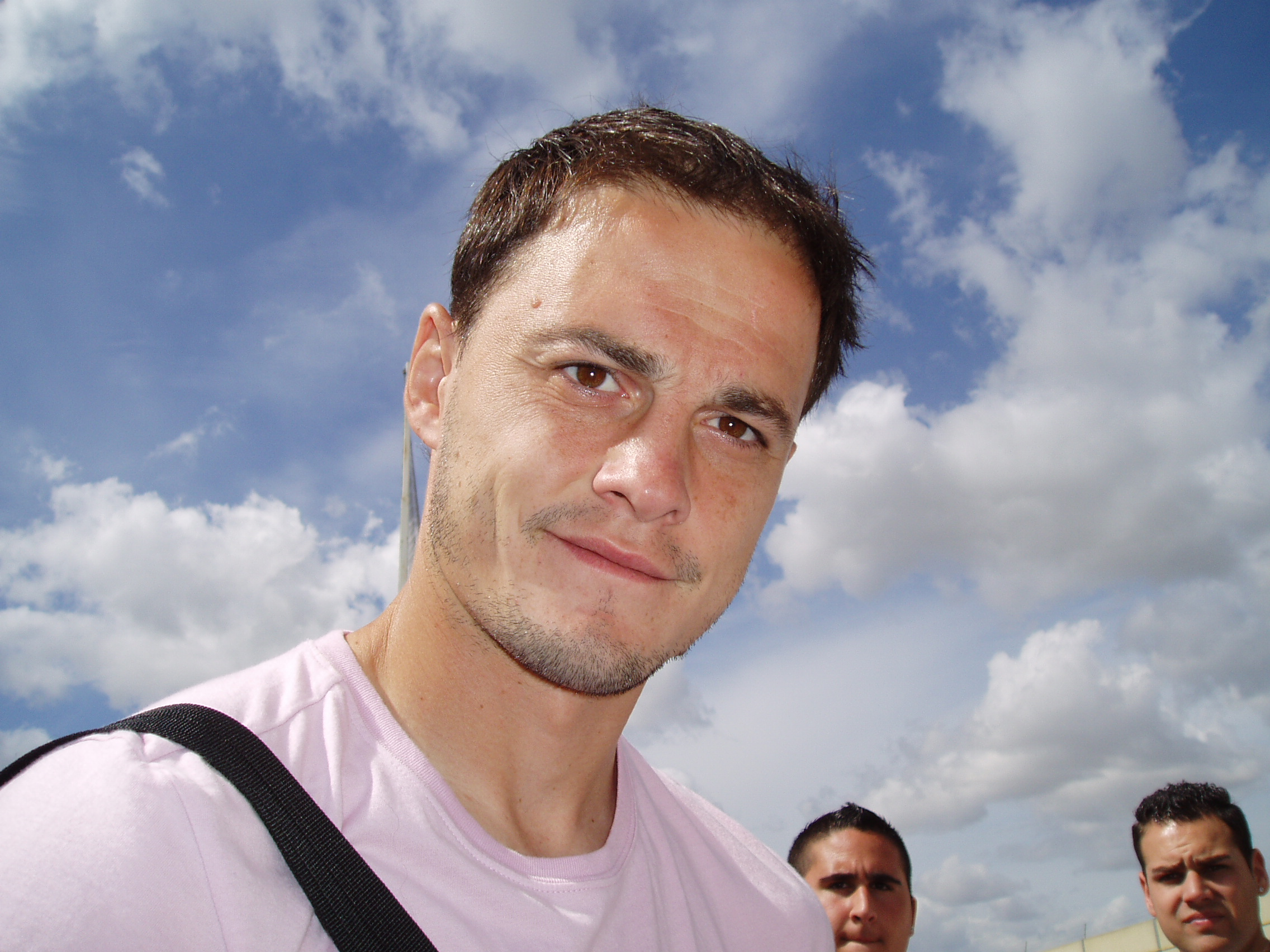
- Nano as a Betis player in 2008

Personal information
- Full name: Victoriano Rivas Álvaro
- Date of birth: 7 July 1980 (age 46)
- Place of birth: Ciudad Real, Spain
- Height: 1.85 m (6 ft 1 in)
- Position: Defender

Team information
- Current team: Leganés (assistant)

Youth career
- Manchego
- Atlético Madrid

Senior career*
Years	Team	Apps	(Gls)
1998–2000	Amorós	44	(3)
2000–2003	Atlético Madrid B	52	(1)
2002–2003	→ Getafe (loan)	26	(2)
2003–2005	Getafe	71	(5)
2005–2010	Betis	41	(2)
2008–2009	→ Valladolid (loan)	12	(0)
2010–2012	Levante	49	(4)
2012–2013	Guizhou Renhe	54	(2)
Total		349	(19)

Managerial career
- 2015–2016: Gimnàstic (assistant)
- 2016–2017: Getafe B
- 2017: Gimnàstic
- 2018: Gimnàstic
- 2018–2019: Roeselare
- 2019: Shanghai Shenhua (assistant)
- 2022–2023: Getafe (assistant)
- 2024: San Fernando
- 2024–2025: Collado Villalba
- 2025–: Leganés (assistant)
- * Club domestic league appearances and goals

Victoriano Rivas Álvaro (Spanish pronunciation: [biɣtoˈɾjano ˈriβas ˈalβaɾo]; born 7 July 1980), known as Nano [ˈnano], is a Spanish former professional footballer who played mainly as a central defender. He is the assistant manager of Segunda División club Leganés.

He appeared in 138 La Liga matches over seven seasons while scoring ten goals, mainly in representation of Betis (three years) and Levante (two). He also represented in the competition Getafe and Valladolid.

== Playing career ==
Born in Ciudad Real, Castilla–La Mancha, Nano made his professional debut with Atlético Madrid's reserves, spending two full seasons with the Segunda División B side. In 2002–03 he was loaned to Getafe CF in the Segunda División, before moving to the club on a permanent deal in summer 2003; an undisputed starter with the Madrid outskirts team, he scored four goals in 37 games in the 2004–05 campaign, their first ever in La Liga.

Nano joined Real Betis in July 2005. He was set to have a promising season before being injured in the UEFA Champions League group-stage fixture against Chelsea at the Manuel Ruiz de Lopera on 1 November, in his only appearance in the competition, as he was sidelined for five months; he also featured once in the UEFA Cup and made 14 league appearances in his first year, playing a further 21 matches for a side that finished 16th in 2006–07.

Established as first-choice alongside veteran Juanito in the 2007–08 campaign, Nano scored in the first matchday against Recreativo de Huelva (1–1 away draw), but suffered a severe knee injury against Deportivo de La Coruña on 16 September 2007, which made him miss six months. Upon return from injury, he netted another important goal for the Andalusians, in a 1–1 draw at former club Getafe on 18 May 2008.

On 1 September 2008, a one-year loan deal was agreed as Nano joined Real Valladolid in a season-long move. He appeared scarcely throughout his spell, as both stopper and left-back, and his return to Betis would be even more unassuming as it consisted of one league match (18 minutes), with the team failing to return to the top division.

In August 2010, aged 30, Nano signed for Levante UD. First-choice during his first season, he scored in a 2–0 home win over Atlético Madrid on 4 December.

Nano started in all the games for the Valencian Community side in the first half of 2011–12, as they spent the vast majority of that period in Champions League qualification positions. In very late January 2012, however, he was sold to Guizhou Renhe F.C. of the Chinese Super League.

Nano announced his retirement in February 2014. On 6 July of the following year, he was appointed Vicente Moreno's assistant manager at Gimnàstic de Tarragona.

== Coaching career ==
On 25 May 2016, Nano was named Getafe CF B manager. He returned to Gimnàstic roughly one year later, being appointed at the main squad for the remainder of the season.

Having managed to narrowly avoid relegation, Nano left Nàstic in June 2017. The following 29 January, however, he replaced the fired Rodri at the helm of the same club, but was himself dismissed on 13 May.

Nano was hired by K.S.V. Roeselare of the Belgian First Division B in November 2018, replacing his compatriot Jordi Condom. Only two months later he left to assist Quique Sánchez Flores at Shanghai Shenhua F.C. and was replaced by a third Spaniard, his former Betis teammate Juanito.

On 29 April 2024, after several years of inactivity, Nano was named manager of Primera Federación side San Fernando CD; he replaced the sacked Alfredo Santaelena.

== Career statistics ==
Appearances and goals by club, season and competition
Club	Season	League			Cup		Continental		Other		Total	
Club	Season	Division	Apps	Goals	Apps	Goals	Apps	Goals	Apps	Goals	Apps	Goals
Getafe (loan)	2002–03	Segunda División	26	2	0	0	—		—		26	2
Getafe	2003–04	Segunda División	34	1	0	0	—		—		34	1
Getafe	2004–05	La Liga	37	4	2	0	—		—		39	4
Getafe	Total		71	5	2	0	—		—		73	5
Betis	2005–06	La Liga	13	0	0	0	4	0	1	0	18	0
Betis	2006–07	La Liga	21	0	3	0	—		—		24	0
Betis	2007–08	La Liga	6	2	1	0	—		—		7	2
Betis	2009–10	Segunda División	1	0	0	0	—		—		1	0
Betis	Total		41	2	4	0	4	0	1	0	51	2
Valladolid (loan)	2008–09	La Liga	12	0	4	0	—		—		16	0
Levante	2010–11	La Liga	32	2	1	0	—		—		33	2
Levante	2011–12	La Liga	17	2	2	0	—		—		19	2
Levante	Total		49	4	3	0	—		—		52	4
Guizhou Renhe	2012	Chinese Super League	29	0	5	0	—		—		34	0
Guizhou Renhe	2013	Chinese Super League	25	2	5	1	6	0	—		36	3
Guizhou Renhe	Total		54	2	10	1	6	0	—		70	3
Career total			253	15	23	1	10	0	1	0	287	16

== Managerial statistics ==
As of match played 25 May 2024

Managerial record by team and tenure
Team	Nat	From	To	Record								Ref
Team	Nat	From	To	G	W	D	L	GF	GA	GD	Win %	Ref
Getafe B	(Spain)	25 May 2016	20 May 2017	38	17	9	12	54	35	+19	44.74	
Gimnàstic	(Spain)	20 May 2017	22 June 2017	3	3	0	0	5	1	+4	100.00	
Gimnàstic	(Spain)	29 January 2018	13 May 2018	15	4	3	8	8	13	−5	26.67	
Roeselare	(Belgium)	12 November 2018	8 January 2019	6	2	2	2	7	7	+0	33.33	
San Fernando	(Spain)	29 April 2024	4 June 2024	4	2	1	1	4	3	+1	50.00	
Total				66	28	15	23	78	59	+19	42.42	—

== Honours ==
Guizhou Renhe

- Chinese FA Cup: 2013
