= Javi Venta =

Spanish footballer (born 1975)

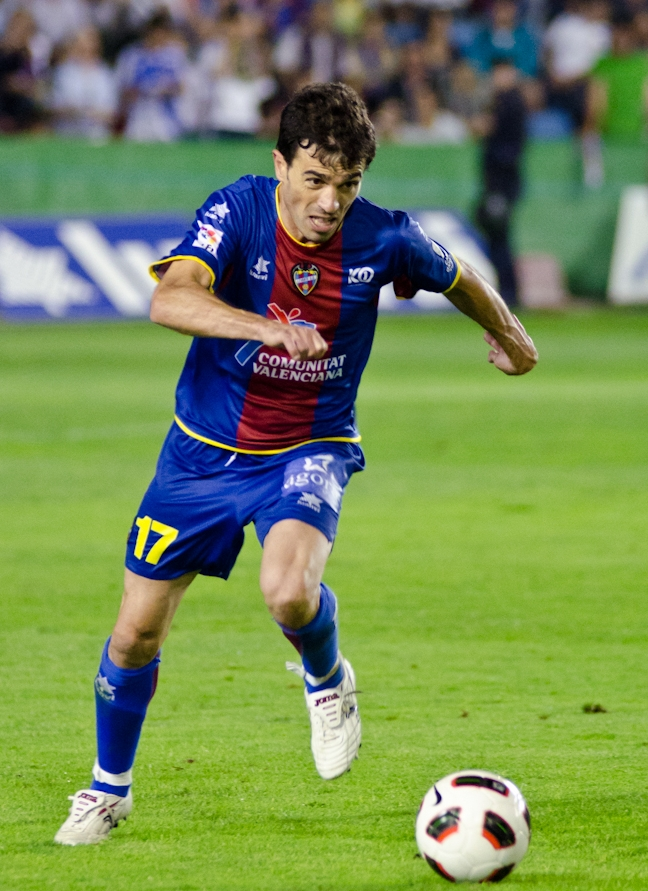
- Venta in action for Levante

Personal information
- Full name: Javier Rodríguez Venta
- Date of birth: 13 December 1975 (age 50)
- Place of birth: Pola de Siero, Spain
- Height: 1.80 m (5 ft 11 in)
- Position: Right-back

Youth career
- 1981–1992: Romanón
- 1992–1995: Oviedo

Senior career*
Years	Team	Apps	(Gls)
1995–1997	Oviedo B		
1996–1997	→ Marino (loan)	20	(0)
1997–1999	Gimnástica	66	(3)
1999–2010	Villarreal	182	(1)
1999–2000	→ Onda (loan)		
2000–2001	→ Racing Ferrol (loan)	39	(0)
2001–2002	→ Tenerife (loan)	29	(1)
2010–2012	Levante	59	(0)
2012–2013	Villarreal	15	(0)
2013	Brentford	1	(0)
Total		411	(5)

International career
2001–2002	Asturias	2	(0)
- * Club domestic league appearances and goals

Javier 'Javi' Rodríguez Venta (born 13 December 1975) is a Spanish former professional footballer who played as a right-back.

He amassed La Liga totals of 270 matches and two goals over 11 seasons, mainly with Villarreal (eight years). He also appeared in the competition with Tenerife and Levante, and had a brief abroad spell in England with Brentford.

== Club career ==
=== Early years ===
Venta was born in Pola de Siero, Asturias. After playing his early career with modest Spanish clubs he was bought in 1999 by Villarreal CF, but would spend the next three seasons with the farm team (CD Onda) and on loan stints.

He made his La Liga debut in the latter predicament in the 2001–02 season, playing 29 league games for CD Tenerife who ranked second-bottom.

=== Villarreal and Levante ===
In 2002–03, Venta returned to Villarreal and went on to become a steady first-choice throughout the season. In the 2004–05 campaign, he appeared in 32 matches as the Valencian side achieved a club-high third place; he was subsequently named by Spain manager Luis Aragonés in his provisional 27-man squad for the 2006 FIFA World Cup, but did not make the final cut.

In late April 2010, it was announced that both the 34-year-old Venta and Robert Pires would be leaving Villarreal. During three years he constantly fought for first-choice status with Ángel López, with both appearing in roughly the same number of games. In late August he signed for one year with Levante UD, returned to the top division after a two-year absence.

Venta started in 25 of his 26 appearances in his second season, totalling 2,224 minutes of action as Levante finished sixth and qualified for the UEFA Europa League for the first time in its history. He did not have an offer to renew his expiring contract, however, and returned to Villarreal for a second stint.

=== Brentford ===
On 11 July 2013, aged 37, Venta moved abroad for the first time in his career, joining Football League One club Brentford on a one-year deal with an option to extend to a second season depending on appearances. He scored his only goal for the club in a 5–3 win against AFC Wimbledon in that season's Football League Trophy on 3 September, which also marked his fourth and final overall appearance; he had his contract terminated by mutual consent on the 30th, and returned to Spain for personal reasons.

== Honours ==
Villarreal

- UEFA Intertoto Cup: 2003, 2004
