= Nabil El Zhar =

Moroccan-French footballer (born 1986)

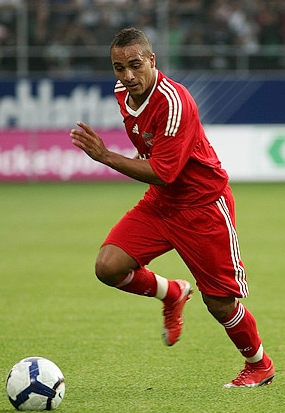
- El Zhar playing for Liverpool in 2009

Personal information
- Full name: Nabil El Zhar
- Date of birth: 27 August 1986 (age 40)
- Place of birth: Alès, France
- Height: 1.70 m (5 ft 7 in)
- Position: Winger

Youth career
- 1996–1999: Alès
- 1999–2004: Nîmes
- 2004–2006: Saint-Étienne

Senior career*
Years	Team	Apps	(Gls)
2006–2011	Liverpool	21	(0)
2010–2011	→ PAOK (loan)	24	(2)
2011–2015	Levante	94	(7)
2015–2017	Las Palmas	32	(4)
2017–2019	Leganés	61	(6)
2019–2021	Al Ahli	41	(15)
2022–2023	Muaither	17	(11)

International career
2004–2008	Morocco U20	8	(3)
2008–2014	Morocco	10	(2)
- * Club domestic league appearances and goals as of 14:30, 8 May 2023 (UTC)

Nabil El Zhar (Arabic: نبيل الزهر; born 27 August 1986) is a former professional footballer who played as a right winger.

He finished his formation at Liverpool, playing sparingly for the club and more consistently on loan at PAOK in 2010–11. He then moved to Spain, spending four La Liga seasons at Levante, before having stints with Las Palmas and Leganés. In 2019, he moved to Qatar where he played first for Al Ahli, and later for Muaither.

El Zhar earned 10 international caps for Morocco from 2008 to 2014.

== Club career ==
=== Youth ===
Born in Alès, Gard, El Zhar began his football career with OAC Alès, a local youth team. From there he moved to Nîmes Olympique, then switched again to AS Saint-Étienne.

=== Liverpool ===
He signed for Liverpool in October 2006 and made his debut for their reserve team against Newcastle in a reserves match on 3 October 2006.

El Zhar made his first team debut on 29 November 2006 in goalless draw against Portsmouth at Anfield, replacing Luis García after 72 minutes. He went on to make two more appearances in the 2006–07 season.

He made his first Liverpool start in a League Cup tie against Cardiff City on 31 October 2007, in which he scored his first goal for the club in a 2–1 home win. El Zhar was moved from the number 42 shirt to the number 31 shirt for the start of the 2008–09 campaign.

El Zhar contributed a first assist on 18 October 2008, coming on for Andrea Dossena with his team 2–1 down against Wigan Athletic. He set up Albert Riera for the equaliser and the game finished 3–2 to Liverpool. On 27 February 2009, he made his first league start for the Reds against Middlesbrough in a 2–0 loss.

On 11 July 2009, he signed a new contract extension to his current Liverpool contract that would have kept him at Anfield until 2012.

==== Loan to PAOK ====
On 31 August 2010, El Zhar completed a loan switch to Greek side PAOK for the upcoming season and was handed the number 7 shirt on his arrival. He made his debut for the club on 16 September in a 1–1 UEFA Europa League group game against Club Brugge, and featured in all five other matches in the group, as the team lost in the last 32 to PFC CSKA Moscow.

El Zhar played 24 matches as the club from Thessaloniki came fourth in the league, scoring in a 2–2 away draw with Atromitos F.C. and a 2–1 victory over Panathinaikos F.C. at the Toumba Stadium.

=== Levante ===
On 18 August 2011, Liverpool announced that El Zhar had been released from his contract and that he was expected to complete a move to Spanish side Levante UD where he would sign a contract to keep him at the Estadi Ciutat de València for two years. He made his La Liga debut ten days later, coming on as a substitute for Pedro López in a 1–1 away draw against Getafe CF. He made 22 appearances across the campaign for the team from Valencia, as they came sixth and qualified for the UEFA Europa League.

El Zhar scored his first goal in the main category of Spanish football on 19 August 2012, netting the first in a 1–1 home draw against Atlético Madrid. Four days later, he came off the bench at Fir Park in a European play-off, and scored the conclusive goal in a 2–0 win over Motherwell. On 26 October 2013, he netted twice in a 4–0 home win over RCD Espanyol.

On 26 August 2015, he rescinded his contract with the Granotes.

=== Las Palmas ===
Hours after rescinding with Levante, El Zhar signed a two-year deal with UD Las Palmas, newly promoted to the top tier. He made his debut on 30 August, a late substitute as his new team hosted a goalless draw with his previous employer. On 6 December, he recorded his first goal for the team from the Canary Islands, equalising in a 3–1 loss at Sporting de Gijón.

=== Leganés ===
On 31 January 2017, El Zhar signed a one-and-a-half-year contract at CD Leganés, halfway through their debut top-flight season.

=== Al Ahli ===
On 30 May 2019, El Zhar agreed to join Qatari club Al Ahli SC.

== International career ==
Although born in France, El Zhar chose to play internationally for the country of his parents, Morocco. However, he did represent France at youth level. El Zhar played in the 2005 FIFA World Youth Championship, and Morocco got to the semi-finals, where they were defeated 3–0 by Nigeria. Morocco ended the tournament in fourth place after a 2–1 loss to Brazil.

On 26 March 2008, made his full international debut for Morocco against Belgium at the Stade Roi Baudouin; he came on at half time in place of Youssouf Hadji and scored in a 4–1 victory. That 21 June, he scored his first competitive goal for the Lions of the Atlas, concluding a 2–0 win over Rwanda in qualification for the 2010 FIFA World Cup.

=== International goals ===
Scores and results list Morocco's goal tally first.

No.	Date	Venue	Opponent	Score	Result	Competition
1.	26 March 2008	King Baudouin Stadium, Brussels, Belgium	Belgium	2–0	2–0	Friendly
2.	21 June 2008	Stade Mohamed V, Casablanca, Morocco	Rwanda	2–0	2–0	2010 FIFA World Cup qualification

== Honours ==
Muaither

- Qatari Second Division: 2022–23
