= José Barkero =

Spanish footballer (born 1979)

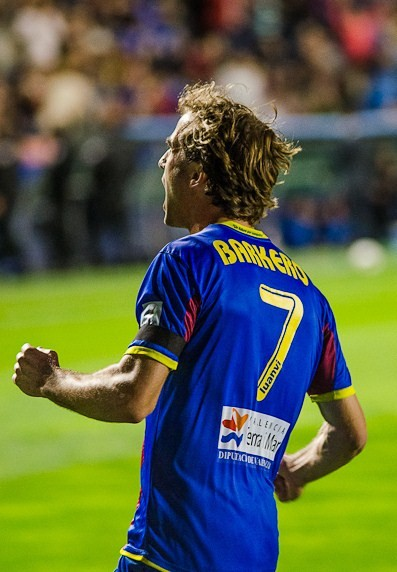
- Barkero celebrates a goal for Levante in 2012

Personal information
- Full name: José Javier Barkero Saludes
- Date of birth: 27 April 1979 (age 47)
- Place of birth: Aretxabaleta, Spain
- Height: 1.80 m (5 ft 11 in)
- Position: Attacking midfielder

Youth career
- 1985–1991: Aretxabaleta
- 1991–1996: Real Sociedad

Senior career*
Years	Team	Apps	(Gls)
1996–1999	Real Sociedad B	96	(28)
1998–2006	Real Sociedad	62	(6)
2000	→ Toulouse (loan)	3	(0)
2001–2002	→ Eibar (loan)	41	(6)
2004	→ Poli Ejido (loan)	20	(0)
2006–2008	Albacete	66	(13)
2008–2011	Numancia	114	(33)
2011–2013	Levante	60	(12)
2013–2014	Zaragoza	29	(3)
Total		491	(101)

International career
1997–1998	Spain U18	13	(3)
1999	Spain U20	7	(2)
1999–2000	Spain U21	2	(0)

Managerial career
- 2016: Aretxabaleta
Medal record
Representing Spain
Men's football
FIFA World Youth Championship
Winner	1999 Nigeria
- * Club domestic league appearances and goals

José Javier Barkero Saludes (born 27 April 1979) is a Spanish former professional footballer. A left-footed attacking midfielder, he possessed a powerful long-range shot.

He amassed La Liga totals of 159 games and 30 goals over one decade, representing in the competition Real Sociedad, Numancia and Levante. He added 233 matches and 43 goals in the Segunda División in eight seasons, with five clubs including the second.

== Club career ==
Born in Aretxabaleta, Gipuzkoa, Barkero was a product of Real Sociedad's youth system, playing one game with the first team in 1998–99. Over eight seasons, he appeared sporadically for the Basque club – 17 La Liga matches maximum, in 2005–06 – and served loans at SD Eibar, Polideportivo Ejido and France's Toulouse FC.

For the 2006–07 campaign, Barkero joined Albacete Balompié in the Segunda División, where he remained two seasons as an undisputed starter. He scored 11 goals in his second year.

After CD Numancia achieved promotion to the top flight, Barkero moved to the side from Soria on a three-year contract in June 2008. On 14 September, he netted from a wonderful long-range strike in a 4–3 away defeat against Real Madrid, and added four more goals in the first 12 games. He finished his first season as their top scorer at 12, but they were relegated as second-bottom.

Barkero scored 15 times for Numancia in the 2010–11 campaign, leading his team in that department in an eventual mid-table finish. Aged 32, he returned to the top division for 2011–12, agreeing to a two-year deal at Levante UD.

Barkero netted five league goals in his second season with the Valencians (seven in all competitions). However, late into the campaign, he also accused teammates Sergio Ballesteros, Juanlu and Gustavo Munúa of lack of commitment during a 4–0 home loss to Deportivo de La Coruña, which led to several match fixing allegations.

In February 2015, after one season with Real Zaragoza in the second tier, the 35-year-old Barkero decided to retire from football after not being able to find a new club.

== International career ==
Barkero scored twice to help Spain win the 1999 FIFA World Youth Championship, including once in the 4–0 final win over Japan.

== Honours ==
Spain U20

- FIFA World Youth Championship: 1999
