= Juanlu (footballer, born 1980) =

Spanish footballer

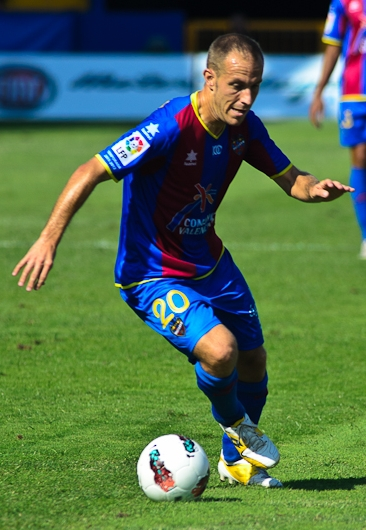
- Juanlu with Levante in 2011

Personal information
- Full name: Juan Luis Gómez López
- Date of birth: 8 May 1980 (age 46)
- Place of birth: Málaga, Spain
- Height: 1.72 m (5 ft 7 1/2 in)
- Position: Midfielder

Youth career
- Don Benito

Senior career*
Years	Team	Apps	(Gls)
2000	Don Benito	1	(0)
2001	Mármol Macael		
2002–2004	Almería	55	(10)
2004	→ Alicante (loan)	15	(1)
2004–2005	Numancia	27	(2)
2005–2009	Betis	3	(0)
2006	→ Albacete (loan)	17	(3)
2006–2007	→ Osasuna (loan)	18	(1)
2007–2008	→ Córdoba (loan)	30	(5)
2009–2013	Levante	112	(21)
2013–2014	Kalloni	7	(0)
2014	Córdoba	13	(0)
Total		298	(43)
- * Club domestic league appearances and goals

Juan Luis Gómez López (born 8 May 1980), commonly known as Juanlu, is a Spanish former professional footballer who played as a left midfielder.

In a senior career that lasted 14 years, he amassed La Liga totals of 122 matches and 14 goals over seven seasons, representing in the competition Numancia, Betis, Osasuna and Levante. He added 136 games and 25 goals in the Segunda División.

== Club career ==
=== Almería ===
Born in Málaga, Juanlu began his career at amateurs CD Don Benito and Mármol Macael CD before signing with neighbouring UD Almería of Segunda División, being first-choice in his first season but only a backup – seven games, none complete – in the second.

During his time at the Andalusia side, Juanlu also had a loan stint at Alicante CF in the Segunda División B.

=== Betis ===
Juanlu made his La Liga debut in the 2004–05 campaign, playing 27 league matches for CD Numancia (two goals, scoring against Real Betis in the league opener on 28 August, in a 1–1 home draw). Upon being relegated, he joined Betis on a six-year contract.

During his time, Juanlu was also loaned to Albacete Balompié and CA Osasuna; unhappy at his lack of first team opportunities in Seville, he showed satisfaction upon his move to Navarre: "I am happy because this deal is good for everyone, especially for me because I've joined a team that's in the Champions League qualifying round." He was relatively utilised in the league, and added six appearances with two goals in the UEFA Cup, including the only in the second leg of the quarter-finals against Bayer 04 Leverkusen.

In August 2007, again on loan, Juanlu moved to another second-division side, Córdoba CF, scoring five goals during the season as they barely avoided relegation. He returned to Betis in July 2008, and was told to look for a new club.

=== Levante ===
After one year out of football, training but not registered, Juanlu broke ties with Betis on 12 June 2009, agreeing to a one-year deal at Levante UD on 28 July. In his first season, the veteran enjoyed his best year, scoring for the first time in double digits as the Valencian Community team returned to the top division two years later.

Juanlu appeared in 28 games in 2010–11 as Levante retained their league status, netting three times. On 23 October 2011, he scored a brace in a 3–0 away win over Villarreal CF as they led the league early into the campaign. In late December, however, whilst playing against Deportivo de La Coruña in the round of 32 of the Copa del Rey, he suffered fibula and ankle ligament fracture following a challenge by Borja, going on to be sidelined for three months.

Juanlu scored twice in 2012–13, in another escape from relegation. One of those goals came on 26 May 2013 at the San Mamés Stadium in a 1–0 defeat of Athletic Bilbao, in what was the last goal ever in the ground. Later that season, he was accused by teammate José Barkero of lack of commitment during a 0–4 home loss to Deportivo alongside Sergio Ballesteros and Gustavo Munúa, which led to several match fixing allegations.

=== Later career ===
On 27 August 2013, aged 33, Juanlu moved abroad for the first time in his career, joining compatriot Jonan García at newly promoted Greek club Kalloni FC. He returned to both Spain and Córdoba in January 2014, going on to appear in 16 competitive matches during the campaign in a top-division promotion after a 42-year absence.
