= Gustavo Munúa =

Uruguayan footballer and manager (born 1978)

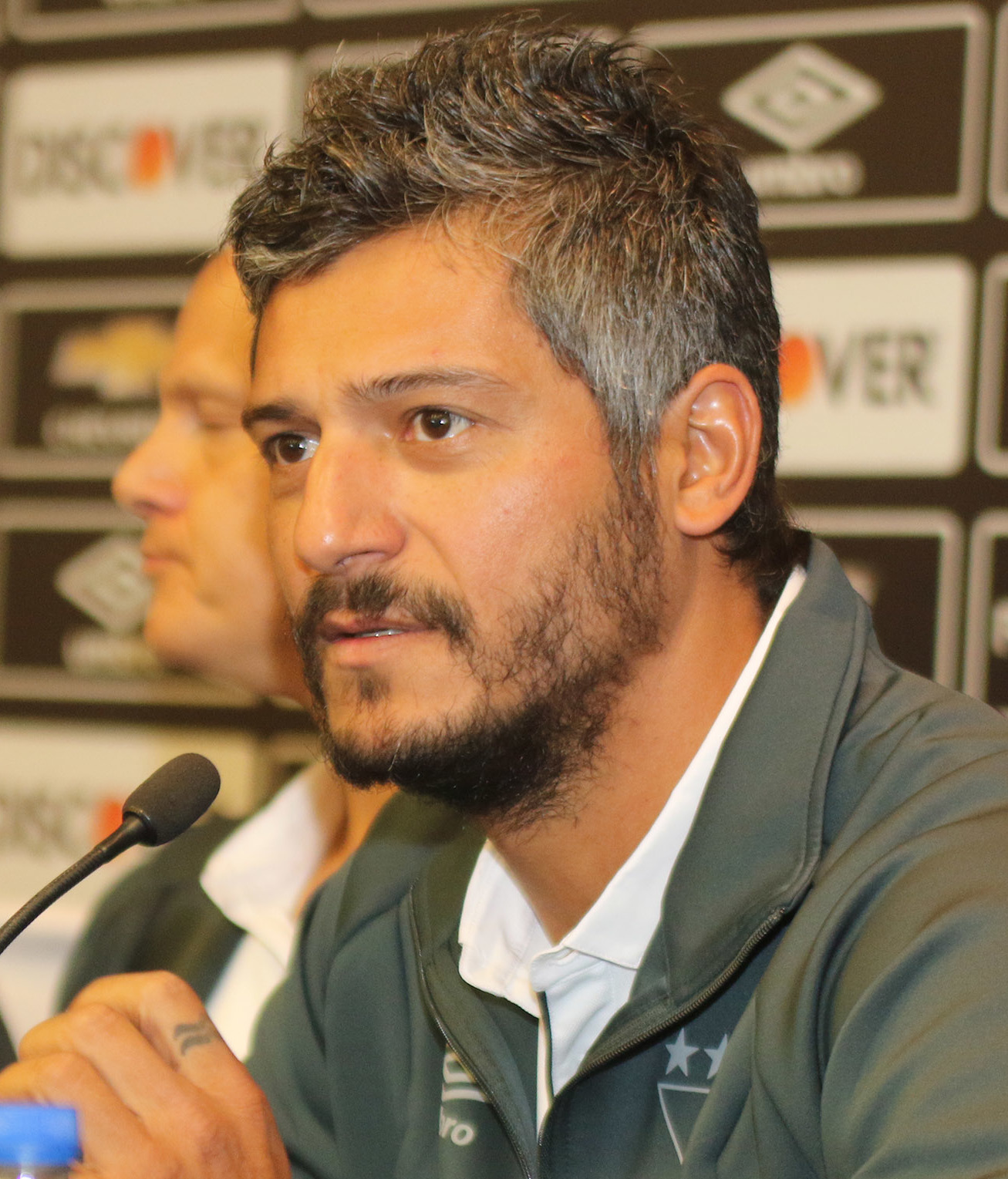
- Munúa presented as coach of LDU in 2017

Personal information
- Full name: Gustavo Adolfo Munúa Vera
- Date of birth: 27 January 1978 (age 48)
- Place of birth: Montevideo, Uruguay
- Height: 1.88 m (6 ft 2 in)
- Position: Goalkeeper

Youth career
- 1986–1997: Nacional

Senior career*
Years	Team	Apps	(Gls)
1997–2003	Nacional	102	(3)
2003–2009	Deportivo La Coruña	27	(0)
2009–2010	Málaga	38	(0)
2010–2013	Levante	86	(0)
2013–2014	Fiorentina	0	(0)
2014–2015	Nacional	41	(0)
Total		294	(3)

International career
1998–2004	Uruguay	21	(0)

Managerial career
- 2015–2016: Nacional
- 2016–2017: LDU
- 2017–2018: Deportivo B
- 2018–2019: Cartagena
- 2019–2020: Nacional
- 2021–2023: Unión Santa Fe
- 2023: Murcia
- 2024: Banfield
- * Club domestic league appearances and goals

Gustavo Adolfo Munúa Vera (born 27 January 1978) is a Uruguayan former professional footballer who played as a goalkeeper, currently a manager.

After starting out at Nacional he spent most of his career in Spain, mainly at Deportivo de La Coruña where he could never be a starter in six seasons. He also played in the country for Málaga and Levante, being first choice and appearing in 151 La Liga matches over one decade.

An Uruguayan international for six years, Munúa represented the country at the 2002 World Cup. As manager, he had two spells at Nacional and also worked in the top divisions of Ecuador and Argentina.

== Club career ==
=== Nacional ===
Born in Montevideo, Munúa started his career at local Nacional, where he won four Uruguayan Primera División titles in a row. He held the record of being the first goalkeeper to score in Uruguayan football, when he netted from a free kick in a league win against Central Español.

Munúa later scored three goals from penalties, both in the league and the Copa Libertadores.

=== Deportivo ===
Munúa left Nacional in 2003, joining La Liga side Deportivo de La Coruña on a six-year contract, where he struggled to gain first-choice status. From 2003 to 2006, he was barred by Spanish international José Francisco Molina and, subsequently, faced stiff competition from Israel's Dudu Aouate.

In January 2008, after regaining first-choice from Aouate, both goalkeepers were involved in a post-training punching session that resulted in both being suspended for the match against Villarreal, as well as subsequent league games. In February, due to B-team goalkeeper Fabri's inexperience, both players were reinstated in the squad, although the Israeli regained his lost spot.

After having started the following season, as Aouate, deemed surplus to requirements, Munúa eventually returned to back-up status, as Aouate was sold to Mallorca and Fabri returned to the reserves. On 25 January 2009, due to the forced absence of new first-choice Dani Aranzubia (sent off the previous week against Barcelona), he returned to action for his only appearance of the campaign, a 1–0 loss at Real Madrid.

=== Málaga and Levante ===
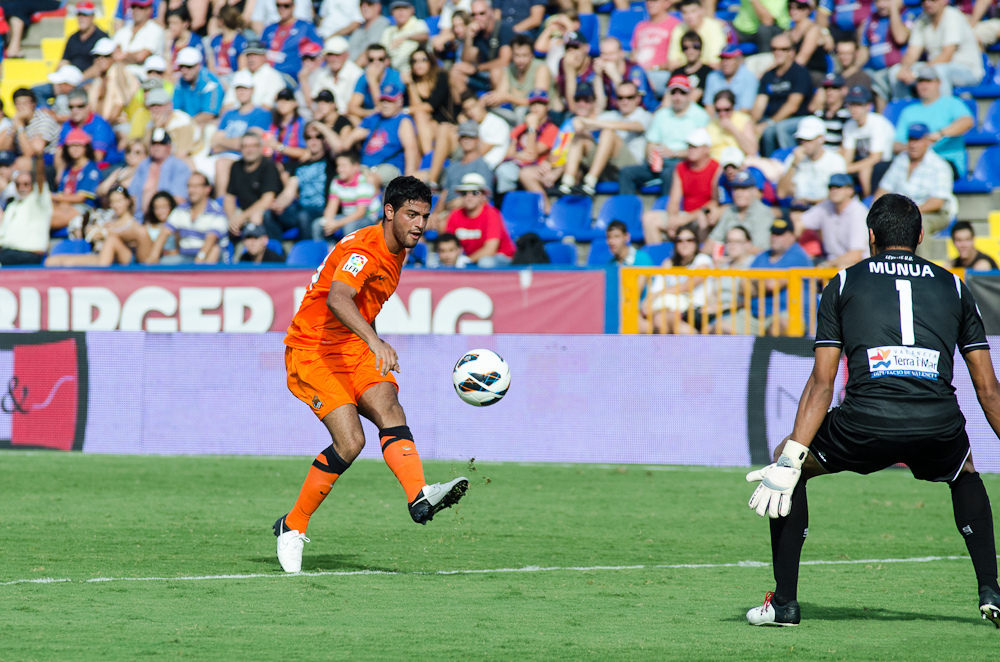
Munúa facing a shot from Real Sociedad's Carlos Vela in 2012

On 28 June 2009, Munúa signed a one-year deal with Málaga. He was first choice from the beginning at his new club, appearing in all the league games in his first year as the Andalusians barely avoided relegation (17th position).

After only one season, Munúa rejected a new contract offer and was released on 26 May 2010. On 6 August he signed with Levante, returned to the top flight after two years, making his official debut on 28 August in a 1–4 home defeat to Sevilla.

Munúa was a starter for the Valencian Community side throughout the vast majority of his spell. However, late into his third season, he, alongside Sergio Ballesteros and Juanlu, was accused by teammate José Barkero of lack of commitment during a 4–0 home loss against Deportivo, which led to several match fixing allegations.

=== Later years ===
In January 2014, after a brief spell with Fiorentina which consisted of two UEFA Europa League appearances, the 36-year-old Munúa returned to his country and Nacional.

== International career ==
Munúa made his debut for Uruguay aged 20, in a friendly match with Chile on 24 May 1998. As a backup, he represented the nation at the 2001 Copa América and the 2002 FIFA World Cup.

== Coaching career ==
After winning the 2015 national championship with the latter, as team captain, Munúa was announced as Álvaro Gutiérrez's replacement as head coach. The following season, he resigned in June 2016 due to a poor showing in the Clausura tournament.

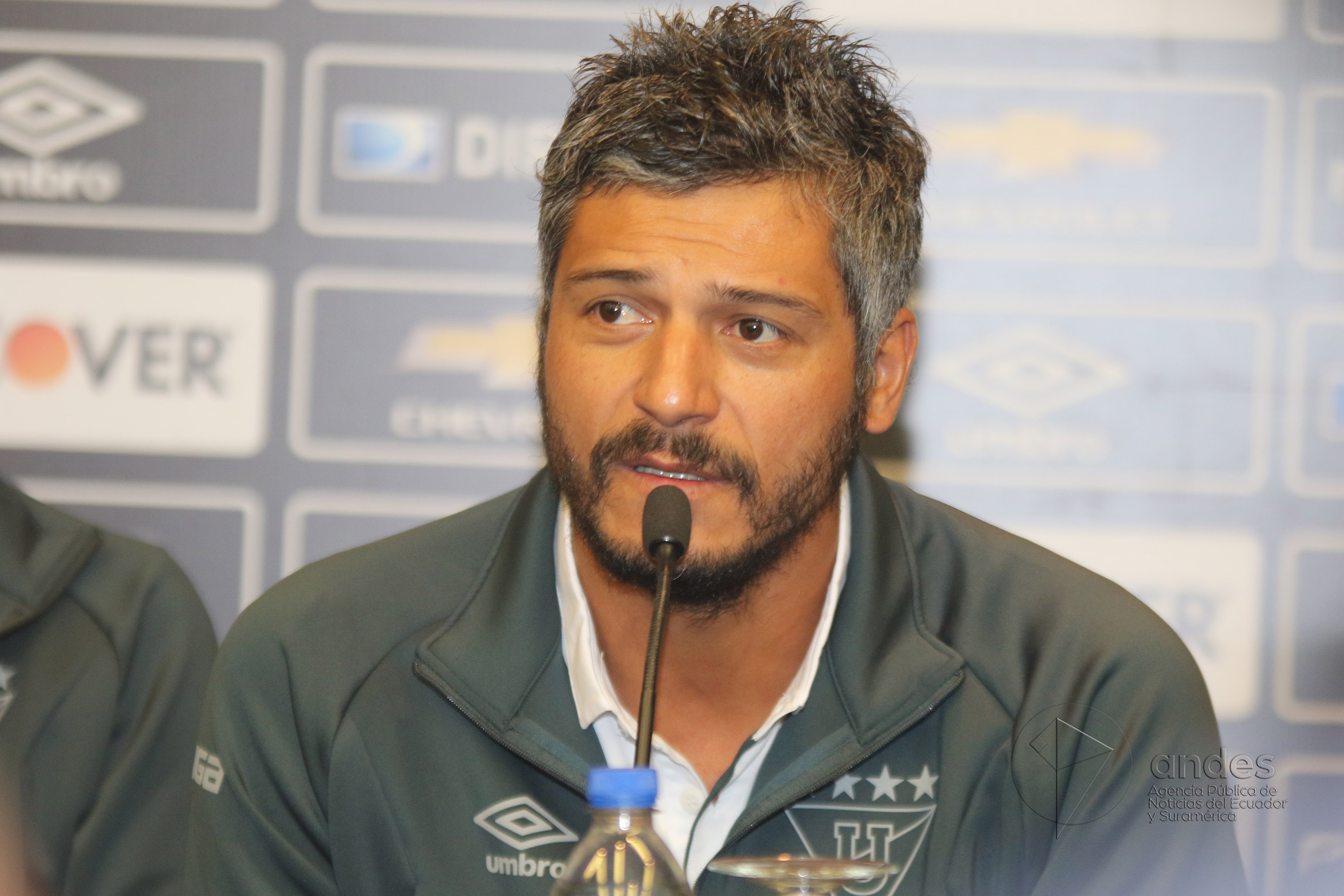
Munúa being presented at L.D.U. Quito

In December 2016, Munúa was named manager of Ecuador's L.D.U. Quito. He was dismissed at the end of July, having won one of 20 league matches, but also reached the knockout stages of the Copa Sudamericana with victories over Defensor Sporting and Club Bolívar.

On 7 November 2017, Munúa returned to his former club Deportivo as manager of their reserves in the Segunda División B. In his one season in the dugout, the club reached the play-offs where they lost on away goals to Extremadura after a 3–3 aggregate draw.

Munúa joined fellow third division side Cartagena on 10 July 2018. He again took his team to the post-season, this time being eliminated 3–1 in the semi-finals by Ponferradina.

On 22 December 2019, Munúa took advantage of a contract clause allowing him to leave for a top-flight or foreign team, and returned to Nacional for the upcoming season; he mentioned the necessity of being nearer his two teenage children. He was relieved of his job on 15 October 2020, after losing the Apertura final to Rentistas.

In October 2021, Munúa was hired at Unión de Santa Fe, ranked 14th in the Argentine Primera División. He led the team to the last 16 of the 2022 Copa Sudamericana, losing 4–1 on aggregate to his former team Nacional. On 4 April 2023, he was dismissed, with one win and four losses leaving the team second from bottom after nine games of the new season.

== Career statistics ==
Appearances and goals by club, season and competition
Club	Season	League			Cup		Continental		Other		Total	
Club	Season	Division	Apps	Goals	Apps	Goals	Apps	Goals	Apps	Goals	Apps	Goals
Nacional	1997	Uruguayan Primera División	1	0	—		1	0	—		2	0
Nacional	1998	Uruguayan Primera División	11	0	—		8	0	—		19	0
Nacional	1999	Uruguayan Primera División	11	0	—		0	0	—		11	0
Nacional	2000	Uruguayan Primera División	0	0	—		1	0	—		1	0
Nacional	2001	Uruguayan Primera División	27	0	—		1	0	—		28	0
Nacional	2002	Uruguayan Primera División	33	1	—		10	0	—		43	1
Nacional	2003	Uruguayan Primera División	19	2	—		8	0	—		27	2
Nacional	Total		102	3	—		29	0	—		131	3
Deportivo La Coruña	2003–04	La Liga	5	0	4	0	1	0	—		10	0
Deportivo La Coruña	2004–05	La Liga	17	0	2	0	2	0	—		21	0
Deportivo La Coruña	2005–06	La Liga	0	0	0	0	0	0	—		0	0
Deportivo La Coruña	2006–07	La Liga	0	0	6	0	—		—		6	0
Deportivo La Coruña	2007–08	La Liga	4	0	2	0	—		—		6	0
Deportivo La Coruña	2008–09	La Liga	1	0	0	0	0	0	—		1	0
Deportivo La Coruña	Total		27	0	14	0	3	0	—		44	0
Málaga	2009–10	La Liga	38	0	0	0	—		—		38	0
Levante	2010–11	La Liga	20	0	4	0	—		—		24	0
Levante	2011–12	La Liga	37	0	2	0	—		—		39	0
Levante	2012–13	La Liga	29	0	0	0	0	0	—		29	0
Levante	Total		86	0	6	0	0	0	—		92	0
Fiorentina	2013–14	Serie A	0	0	0	0	2	0	—		2	0
Nacional	2013–14	Uruguayan Primera División	15	0	—		5	0	—		20	0
Nacional	2014–15	Uruguayan Primera División	26	0	—		2	0	1	0	29	0
Nacional	Total		41	0	—		7	0	1	0	92	0
Career total			294	3	20	0	41	0	1	0	356	3

=== International ===
Appearances and goals by national team and year
National team	Year	Apps	Goals
Uruguay	1998	1	0
Uruguay	2000	0	0
Uruguay	2001	5	0
Uruguay	2002	3	0
Uruguay	2003	8	0
Uruguay	2004	4	0
Uruguay	2005	0	0
Total		21	0

== Managerial statistics ==
As of 11 November 2024

Managerial record by team and tenure
Team	Nat	From	To	Record								Ref
Team	Nat	From	To	G	W	D	L	GF	GA	GD	Win %	Ref
Nacional	(Uruguay)	29 June 2015	5 June 2016	44	20	14	10	67	50	+17	45.45	
LDU	(Ecuador)	13 December 2016	3 July 2017	22	2	11	9	23	35	−12	9.09	
Deportivo B	(Spain)	7 November 2017	28 May 2018	27	13	5	9	31	25	+6	48.15	
Cartagena	(Spain)	10 July 2018	22 December 2019	63	36	15	12	93	46	+47	57.14	
Nacional	(Uruguay)	22 December 2019	16 October 2020	22	11	7	4	36	24	+12	50.00	
Unión Santa Fe	(Argentina)	27 September 2021	4 April 2023	72	23	19	30	78	83	−5	31.94	
Murcia	(Spain)	1 July 2023	8 November 2023	12	5	2	5	11	13	−2	41.67	
Banfield	(Argentina)	22 June 2024	12 November 2024	18	4	7	7	17	22	−5	22.22	
Total				280	114	80	86	356	298	+58	40.71	—

== Honours ==
Nacional

- Uruguayan Primera División: 1998, 2000, 2001, 2002, 2014–15

Uruguay

- FIFA U-20 World Cup runner-up: 1997
