= Carlos Aranda =

Spanish professional footballer (born 1980)

Personal information
- Full name: Carlos Reina Aranda
- Date of birth: 27 July 1980 (age 46)
- Place of birth: Málaga, Spain
- Height: 1.85 m (6 ft 1 in)
- Position: Forward

Youth career
- Real Madrid

Senior career*
Years	Team	Apps	(Gls)
1999–2000	Real Madrid C	32	(14)
2000–2002	Real Madrid B	37	(16)
2002	Numancia	13	(3)
2002	Villarreal	8	(1)
2003	Numancia	15	(5)
2003–2004	Albacete	25	(8)
2004–2006	Sevilla	16	(1)
2005–2006	→ Albacete (loan)	24	(4)
2006–2007	Murcia	26	(11)
2007–2008	Granada 74	15	(2)
2008–2009	Numancia	20	(6)
2009–2011	Osasuna	49	(9)
2011	Levante	10	(0)
2012–2013	Zaragoza	24	(2)
2013	Granada	17	(1)
2013–2014	Las Palmas	24	(6)
2014–2015	Numancia	8	(2)
Total		363	(91)

International career
1998	Spain U17	3	(1)
- * Club domestic league appearances and goals

Carlos Reina Aranda (born 27 July 1980) is a Spanish former professional footballer who played mainly as a forward.

He amassed La Liga totals of 169 games and 28 goals over 11 seasons after emerging from Real Madrid's youth academy, representing in the competition Villarreal, Albacete, Sevilla, Numancia, Osasuna, Levante, Zaragoza and Granada. He added 125 matches and 33 goals in the Segunda División, in a 17-year senior career.

== Club career ==
Aranda was born in Málaga, Andalusia. A product of Real Madrid's youth system, he never appeared, however, in any La Liga matches with the first team. He played, however, a small part in two UEFA Champions League-winning squads, appearing against Molde FK (1999–2000) and FC Lokomotiv Moscow (2001–02).

In January 2002, Aranda moved to CD Numancia, being instrumental in helping the Soria club to barely retain its Segunda División status. This prompted a move at the end of the season to Villarreal CF on a five-year contract but, as opportunities were scarce with the Valencian Community side, he returned to Numancia in January 2003.

Aranda joined Sevilla FC in 2004–05, scoring in his UEFA Cup debut, a 2–0 home win over Alemannia Aachen on 4 November 2004. He was relatively used during the campaign, but was deemed surplus to requirements after the arrivals of Luís Fabiano, Frédéric Kanouté and Javier Saviola, and left for Albacete Balompié on loan – he had already represented the Castilla–La Mancha team the previous season.

Aranda's second spell with Albacete finished on a sour note, as he was accused of unprofessional behaviour by the club. He responded claiming he had been forced to appear at a press conference to show repentance for his actions.

After being instrumental in Real Murcia CF's return to the top flight in 2007 by netting 11 goals, squad second-best behind Iván Alonso, Aranda had an unassuming spell with Granada 74 CF. After spending the first months of 2008–09 training with lowly CF Gavà, in December 2008 he signed with Numancia for a third stint, appearing and scoring regularly but suffering top-division relegation.

On 16 July 2009, Aranda moved to CA Osasuna as part of a deal that saw Kike Sola move in the opposite direction, on loan for a season. In his second year with the Navarrese, he scored four times but also struggled with injuries and loss of form, and Sola also returned to the starting XI, eventually finishing as top scorer.

In July 2011, aged 31, Aranda signed for Levante UD. In January of the following year, after having received very little playing time, he joined fellow top-tier side Real Zaragoza. On 25 February 2012, he put the visitors ahead at hometown's Málaga CF, who eventually won 5–1.

Aranda switched clubs again in the winter transfer window of 2013, signing for his eighth in the Spanish main division, Granada CF, the most for any player.

== Honours ==
Real Madrid

- UEFA Champions League: 1999–2000, 2001–02
