= Sergio Ballesteros =

Spanish footballer

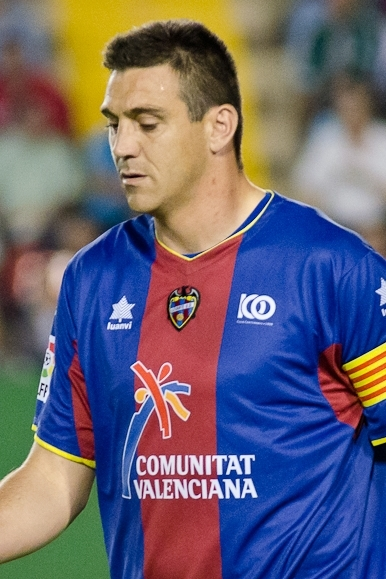
- Ballesteros in action for Levante in 2011

Personal information
- Full name: Sergio Martínez Ballesteros
- Date of birth: 4 September 1975 (age 51)
- Place of birth: Burjassot, Spain
- Height: 1.88 m (6 ft 2 in)
- Position: Centre-back

Youth career
- Levante

Senior career*
Years	Team	Apps	(Gls)
1994–1996	Levante	36	(4)
1996	→ Tenerife (loan)	6	(0)
1996–2000	Tenerife	86	(4)
2000–2001	Rayo Vallecano	36	(2)
2001–2004	Villarreal	81	(1)
2004–2008	Mallorca	103	(1)
2008–2013	Levante	174	(3)
Total		522	(15)

International career
1996–1998	Spain U21	12	(0)
1997	Spain U23	3	(0)
- * Club domestic league appearances and goals

Sergio Martínez Ballesteros (born 4 September 1975) is a Spanish former professional footballer who played as a central defender.

He started and finished his 19-year career with Levante, amassing La Liga totals of 387 games and eight goals over 15 seasons. He also represented in the competition Tenerife (four years), Rayo Vallecano, Villarreal (three) and Mallorca (four).

== Club career ==
Born in Burjassot, Valencian Community, Ballesteros came through the ranks of local Levante UD. In January 1996 he moved on loan to the Canary Islands' CD Tenerife, making his La Liga debut on 3 January in a 2–0 home win against Racing de Santander. After making the move permanent he went on to become an important defensive player, also starting to garner a reputation as a tough, sometimes to excess, central defender: in the 1998–99 season, as Tenerife ranked second-bottom, he was sent off twice in just eight appearances.

For the 2000–01 campaign, Ballesteros moved to Rayo Vallecano in Madrid, collecting ten yellow cards in his only season and playing all the games and minutes in the team's quarter-final run in the UEFA Cup. He subsequently spent three years at Villarreal CF, being an important defensive element as the club consolidated in the main division.

From 2004 to 2008, Ballesteros represented RCD Mallorca also in the top flight, receiving eight additional marching orders in 113 first-team appearances. In July 2008 the 33-year-old was deemed surplus to requirements and released, re-joining Levante, recently relegated to the Segunda División, after 13 years.

Veteran Ballesteros rarely missed a match for the Granotas the following seasons, playing 34 matches in 2010–11 (one goal, against CA Osasuna in a 2–1 home win) as the team finally retained their top-flight status. He fared even better the following campaign – also finding the net once, at Rayo Vallecano in a 2–1 victory– to help the side finish sixth and qualify for the Europa League for the first time ever.

Ballesteros was again a starter and team captain in 2012–13. However, late into the campaign, he, alongside Juanlu and Gustavo Munúa, was accused by teammate José Barkero of lack of commitment during a 0–4 home loss to Deportivo de La Coruña, which led to several match fixing allegations.

== Honours ==
Levante

- Segunda División B: 1995–96

Villarreal

- UEFA Intertoto Cup: 2003, 2004

Spain U21

- UEFA European Under-21 Championship: 1998
