= Pedro Botelho (footballer, born 1989) =

Brazilian footballer

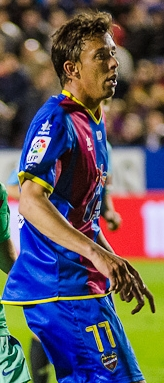

Personal information
- Full name: Pedro Roberto da Silva Botelho
- Date of birth: 14 December 1989 (age 36)
- Place of birth: Salvador, Brazil
- Height: 1.86 m (6 ft 1 in)
- Positions: Left back; midfielder

Team information
- Current team: Betim

Youth career
- 2002–2004: Galícia
- 2005–2007: Figueirense

Senior career*
Years	Team	Apps	(Gls)
2007–2012	Arsenal	0	(0)
2007–2009	→ Salamanca (loan)	36	(0)
2009–2010	→ Celta (loan)	27	(1)
2010–2011	→ Cartagena (loan)	39	(4)
2011–2012	→ Rayo Vallecano (loan)	11	(1)
2012	→ Levante (loan)	14	(0)
2012–2016	Atlético Paranaense	41	(4)
2014–2015	→ Atlético Mineiro (loan)	18	(1)
2016	→ Estoril (loan)	11	(1)
2017	Boavista-RJ	0	(0)
2017	CRB	10	(0)
2018	Vitória	5	(1)
2018	São Bento	4	(0)
2020–2021	Rio Branco	23	(1)
2022	Real Noroeste	26	(0)
2023	Nova Venécia	14	(1)
2023	Portuguesa-RJ	17	(1)
2024	Rio Branco-ES	15	(0)
2024	Portuguesa-RJ	11	(0)
2025	Desportiva Ferroviária	23	(0)
2026	Jataiense	10	(0)
2026-	Joinville	9	(0)
2026	→ Betim (loan)	4	(0)
- * Club domestic league appearances and goals as of 2 October 2018

Pedro Roberto da Silva Botelho (born 14 December 1989) is a Brazilian professional footballer who plays for Betim. Mainly a left back, he can also play as a left midfielder.

He was bought by Arsenal before his 18th birthday but never appeared competitively for the club, playing in Spain for the duration of his contract and being released in 2012.

== Football career ==
Born in Salvador, Bahia, Botelho began playing professionally with Figueirense Futebol Clube. In July 2007 a deal was agreed with Premier League side Arsenal, which brought the player to the Emirates Stadium. However, he was immediately loaned out to UD Salamanca of Segunda División for the remainder of the season – this was because he needed a work permit to play in England.

In July 2008, Botelho returned to Arsenal for pre-season training before moving again to Salamanca in August, for another season-long loan. Due to differences with the Spanish club's coaching staff, his second spell was cut short.

On 23 July 2009, Botelho went on loan again and also in the Spanish second tier, joining RC Celta de Vigo for the upcoming campaign. He helped the Galicians knock Villarreal CF out of the Copa del Rey, winning a late penalty in the second leg which ended with a 1–0 away triumph (2–1 aggregate) in the round-of-16.

Botelho returned to the Spanish second division on 23 July 2010, joining FC Cartagena on a season-long loan after an application for a work permit was denied. Another loan happened in the following campaign as he made his La Liga debut with Rayo Vallecano, first appearing in the competition on 28 August 2011 by starting as a left midfielder in a 1–1 away draw against Athletic Bilbao.

After an irregular spell in Madrid which also included personal issues, Botelho finished the campaign at fellow league club Levante UD, joining the team on 20 January 2012. On 23 July, having failed to appear officially for Arsenal, he returned to Brazil and joined Clube Atlético Paranaense on a permanent deal; the latter team also loaned him on two occasions, to Clube Atlético Mineiro and G.D. Estoril Praia.

Botelho settled rarely in the following years, representing Boavista Sport Club, Clube de Regatas Brasil, Esporte Clube Vitória and Esporte Clube São Bento in his homeland while alternating between the Série A and the Série B championships.

On 29 November 2019 it was confirmed, that Botelho had signed with Rio Branco after having been without club since October 2018.

== Honours ==
Atlético Mineiro

- Copa do Brasil: 2014
- Campeonato Mineiro: 2015
- Recopa Sudamericana: 2014
