= Xavi Torres =

Spanish footballer (born 1986)

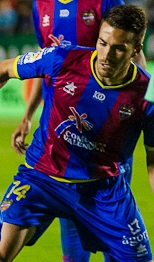
- Torres with Levante in 2012

Personal information
- Full name: Xavier Torres Buigues
- Date of birth: 21 November 1986 (age 39)
- Place of birth: Xàbia, Spain
- Height: 1.82 m (6 ft 0 in)
- Position: Defensive midfielder

Youth career
- 1994–2006: Villarreal

Senior career*
Years	Team	Apps	(Gls)
2005–2006	Villarreal B		
2006–2007	Alicante	33	(4)
2007–2009	Barcelona B	59	(5)
2009	Barcelona	2	(0)
2009–2012	Málaga	11	(1)
2010–2012	→ Levante (loan)	69	(5)
2012–2013	Getafe	35	(0)
2013–2016	Betis	48	(2)
2016–2017	Sporting Gijón	17	(0)
2017–2018	Perth Glory	24	(4)
2018–2019	Elche	29	(6)
2019–2020	Al-Arabi	32	(6)
2020–2023	Lugo	98	(6)
Total		457	(39)
- * Club domestic league appearances and goals

Xavier "Xavi" Torres Buigues (born 21 November 1986) is a Spanish former professional footballer who played as a defensive midfielder.

Brought up at Barcelona, he went on to amass La Liga totals of 156 games and six goals over eight seasons, with that club, Málaga, Levante, Getafe, Betis and Sporting de Gijón.

== Club career ==
=== Early years ===
Born in Xàbia, Alicante, Valencian Community, Torres spent his entire youth career at Villarreal CF. He made his professional debut at another club in the region, Alicante CF, in the 2006–07 edition of Segunda División B.

=== Barcelona ===
Torres signed for FC Barcelona in July 2007, after Villarreal bought him back from Alicante. He spent the vast majority of his two-year spell with the reserve team, which he helped to return to the third division in his debut campaign as the Catalans were coached by young Pep Guardiola.

Torres made his La Liga debut on 17 May 2009, appearing for the already crowned champions in a 2–1 away loss against RCD Mallorca. At the end of the match, the player said that he was very grateful to Guardiola – promoted to first-team manager the previous summer – for giving him an opportunity to play in the main squad; it would be the first of two appearances.

=== Málaga ===
On 17 June 2009, Málaga CF signed Torres on a free transfer for four seasons. He scored his first goal with the Andalusians on 30 August, closing a 3–0 home victory over Atlético Madrid in the 89th minute, in the season's opener.

Torres made his Málaga debut as a starter on 13 September 2009, in a 1–0 defeat at Deportivo de La Coruña, being replaced by Victor Obinna in the 84th minute. However, he appeared rarely in his first year and, on 7 June 2010, was loaned to recently promoted side Levante UD. His first competitive match for the latter took place on 28 August, when he featured the entire 1–4 home loss against Sevilla FC.

=== Levante ===
In early December 2010, Torres was linked with a potential move to Everton, but nothing came of it. He rarely missed a game for Levante – being the second-most used player in the squad – as the Valencian team finally retained their top-division status. In July 2011, the move was extended for a further season.

Torres scored his first goal for the Granotas on 20 November 2011, in a 3–2 away loss to Atlético Madrid. He ended the campaign with five, as they finished sixth and qualified for the UEFA Europa League for the first time ever.

=== Getafe ===
On 31 May 2012, Levante activated the €300,000 buying option it had on Torres, offering the player a four-year contract which he refused. On 1 August, following lengthy negotiations, he signed a four-year deal with fellow top-flight Getafe CF for a fee of approximately €500,000.

Torres started in most of his league appearances for the Madrid outskirts club (37 official matches during the season), his first being on 26 August 2012 in the 2–1 home victory over Real Madrid where he featured 90 minutes.

=== Betis ===
On 7 August 2013, Torres signed for four seasons with Real Betis. He scored his first competitive goal 22 days later, the last in a 6–0 home rout of FK Baumit Jablonec in the Europa League playoff round. In December, however, he suffered an Achilles tendon injury in a game against HNK Rijeka in the same competition and was sidelined for the rest of the campaign, which ended with relegation to the second tier.

=== Later career ===
Torres terminated his contract with Betis on 15 August 2016, and joined Sporting de Gijón on a one-year deal shortly after. One year and ten days later, after suffering relegation, the 30-year-old moved abroad for the first time in his career, on a one-year contract at Australian club Perth Glory FC.

On 31 July 2018, Torres returned to Spain and its second division by agreeing to a contract with Elche CF. In August 2019, he went back overseas to sign for Al-Arabi SC of the Kuwaiti Premier League, under his former Levante manager Juan Ignacio Martínez.

On 14 September 2020, the free agent Torres moved to second-tier CD Lugo on a one-year deal.

== Career statistics ==
As of match played on 14 April 2018

Club statistics
Club	Season	League			Cup		Continental		Other		Total	
Club	Season	Division	Apps	Goals	Apps	Goals	Apps	Goals	Apps	Goals	Apps	Goals
Alicante	2006–07	Segunda División B	33	4	1	0	—		4 (Note: Appearances in Segunda División B play-offs)	0	38	4
Barcelona B	2008–09	Segunda División B	26	1	—		—		—		26	1
Barcelona	2008–09	La Liga	2	0	0	0	0	0	0	0	2	0
Málaga	2009–10	La Liga	11	1	4	0	—		—		15	1
Levante (loan)	2010–11	La Liga	35	0	3	0	—		—		38	0
Levante (loan)	2011–12	La Liga	34	5	3	0	—		—		37	5
Levante (loan)	Total		69	5	6	0	—		—		75	5
Getafe	2012–13	La Liga	35	0	2	0	—		—		37	0
Betis	2013–14	La Liga	10	0	1	0	6 (Note: Appearances in UEFA Europa League)	1	—		17	1
Betis	2014–15	Segunda División	26	2	2	0	—		—		28	2
Betis	2015–16	La Liga	12	0	2	0	—		—		14	0
Betis	Total		48	2	5	0	6	1	—		59	3
Sporting Gijón	2016–17	La Liga	17	0	2	0	—		—		19	0
Perth Glory	2017–18	A-League	24	4	0	0	—		—		24	4
Career total			265	17	20	0	6	1	4	0	295	18

== Honours ==
Barcelona

- La Liga: 2008–09

Betis

- Segunda División: 2014–15

Al-Arabi

- Kuwait Emir Cup: 2019–20
