= 2010–11 Granada CF season =

Granada
2010–11 season
- President: Quique Pina
- Head coach: Fabri
- Stadium: Nuevo Los Cármenes
- Segunda División: 5th (promoted)
- Copa del Rey: Third round
- Biggest win: Granada 5–0 Xerez; Granada 6–1 Gimnàstic
- Biggest defeat: Barcelona B 4–0 Granada
Home colours	Away colours	Third colours

The 2010–11 season was Granada CF's 80th season in existence and the club's first season back in the second division of Spanish football since 1988.

== Players ==
=== First-team squad ===
As of 31 January 2011.

Note: Flags indicate national team as defined under FIFA eligibility rules; some limited exceptions apply. Players may hold more than one non-FIFA nationality.

No.	Pos.	Nation	Player
1	GK	ESP	José Juan
2	DF	FRA	Allan Nyom (on loan from Udinese)
3	DF	ESP	Rubén Párraga
5	DF	ESP	Diego Mainz (on loan from Udinese)
7	FW	NGA	Odion Ighalo (on loan from Udinese)
8	MF	ESP	Granada
9	MF	ESP	Carlos Calvo (on loan from Udinese)
10	MF	ESP	Juan José Collantes
11	MF	ESP	Dani Benítez (on loan from Udinese)
12	DF	ESP	Iñigo López
13	GK	ESP	Roberto
14	MF	ESP	Mikel Rico

No.	Pos.	Nation	Player
15	DF	BRA	Guilherme Siqueira (on loan from Udinese)
17	MF	CHI	Fabián Orellana (on loan from Udinese)
18	DF	ESP	Manuel Lucena (captain)
19	MF	ESP	Juande (on loan from Betis)
20	FW	ESP	Álex Cruz
21	MF	ESP	Óscar Pérez (on loan from Udinese)
22	FW	SUI	Alexandre Geijo (on loan from Udinese)
23	MF	ESP	Abel
24	FW	COL	Luis Muriel (on loan from Udinese)
25	DF	GHA	Jonathan Mensah (on loan from Udinese)
30	GK	ESP	Rafa

=== Out on loan ===
Note: Flags indicate national team as defined under FIFA eligibility rules; some limited exceptions apply. Players may hold more than one non-FIFA nationality.

No.	Pos.	Nation	Player
—	DF	ESP	Jonathan Rosales (at Guijuelo)
—	MF	ESP	Pedro Barrancos (at UD Logroñés)
—	FW	URU	Matías Alonso (at Cerro)

== Pre-season and friendlies ==
Win Draw Loss

24 July 2010 Friendly	Motril	3–1	Granada	Motril, Spain
CEST (UTC+2)

29 July 2010 Friendly	Maracena	0–2	Granada	Maracena, Spain
CEST (UTC+2)

4 August 2010 Friendly	Puente Tocinos	0–7	Granada	La Manga, Spain
CEST (UTC+2)		Report		Referee: Alcaraz Fructuoso

7 August 2010 Friendly	Alicante	1–1	Granada	La Manga, Spain
CEST (UTC+2)		Report

9 August 2010 Friendly	Jumilla	0–0	Granada	La Manga, Spain
CEST (UTC+2)		Report

12 August 2010 Friendly	Granada	0–1	Hércules	Almuñécar, Spain
21:00 CEST (UTC+2)		Report	Portillo 75'	Stadium: Municipal Francisco Bonet; Attendance: 3,500; Referee: José Luis Paradas Romero

14 August 2010 Trofeo Memorial Juan Rojas	Almería	2–0	Granada	Almería, Spain
CEST (UTC+2)	Ulloa 51'; Goitom 82'	Report		Stadium: Estadio de los Juegos Mediterráneos; Attendance: 4,700; Referee: José Luis Paradas Romero

18 August 2010 Los Cármenes Trophy	Granada	1–0	Málaga	Granada, Spain
CEST (UTC+2)	Geijo	Report		Stadium: Nuevo Los Cármenes

21 August 2010 Friendly	Granada	0–1	Almería	Granada, Spain
21:00 CEST (UTC+2)		Report	Valeri 41'	Stadium: Nuevo Los Cármenes; Attendance: 5,000; Referee: Chávez García

24 November 2010 3rd Antonio Puerta Trophy	Sevilla	1–1 (2–4 p)	Granada	Sevilla, Spain
22:00 CET	José Carlos 58'; Cigarini (yellow card) 79'		Calvo 9'	Stadium: Ramón Sánchez Pizjuán; Attendance: 3,000; Referee: Mariscal Sánchez
	Penalties
	Renato (penalty scored); Campaña (penalty missed); José Carlos (penalty missed); Rodri (penalty scored)		(penalty scored) Siqueira; (penalty scored) Pérez; (penalty scored) Abel; (penalty scored) Lucena

== Competitions ==
=== Overall record ===
Competition	First match	Last match	Starting round	Final position	Record							
Competition	First match	Last match	Starting round	Final position	Pld	W	D	L	GF	GA	GD	Win %
Segunda División	29 August 2010	4 June 2011	Matchday 1	5th	42	18	14	10	71	47	+24	42.86
Segunda División promotion play-offs	8 June 2011	18 June 2011	Semi-finals	Winners	4	1	2	1	2	2	+0	25.00
Copa del Rey	1 September 2010	8 September 2010	Second round	Third round	2	1	1	0	0	0	+0	50.00
Total					48	20	17	11	73	49	+24	41.67

Source: Soccerway

=== Segunda División ===
==== League table ====
Pos	Team	Pld	W	D	L	GF	GA	GD	Pts	Promotion, qualification or relegation
3	Barcelona B (Note: Barcelona B could not participate in the play-offs as they are Barcelona's reserve team, so the seventh positioned team qualified for the play-offs.)	42	20	11	11	85	62	+23	71	
4	Elche	42	18	15	9	55	42	+13	69	Qualification to promotion play-offs
5	Granada (P)	42	18	14	10	71	47	+24	68	Qualification to promotion play-offs
6	Celta de Vigo	42	17	16	9	62	43	+19	67	Qualification to promotion play-offs
7	Valladolid	42	19	9	14	65	51	+14	66	Qualification to promotion play-offs

Source: FBref – 2010–2011 Segunda Stats
Rules for classification: 1st points; 2nd head-to-head points; 3rd head-to-head goal difference; 4th head-to-head goals scored; 5th goal difference; 6th number of goals scored; 7th Fair-play points
(P) Promoted

==== Results by round ====
Round	1	2	3	4	5	6	7	8	9	10	11	12	13	14	15	16	17	18	19	20	21	22	23	24	25	26	27	28	29	30	31	32	33	34	35	36	37	38	39	40	41	42
Ground	A	H	A	H	A	H	A	H	A	H	A	H	A	H	A	H	A	H	A	A	H	H	A	H	A	H	A	H	A	H	A	H	A	H	A	H	A	H	A	H	H	A
Result	L	L	L	W	D	W	W	D	D	W	L	W	L	D	D	W	D	W	L	D	W	W	W	W	D	W	L	L	D	D	D	W	L	W	D	W	W	W	L	W	D	D
Position	21	22	21	17	16	14	10	10	12	8	9	7	8	10	11	9	8	7	8	7	6	5	5	4	4	4	4	4	5	6	7	5	6	6	6	5	5	3	4	3	4	5

Source: BDFutbol
A = Away; H = Home; W = Win; D = Draw; L = Loss

==== Matches ====
29 August 2010 1	Real Betis	4–1	Granada	Seville
CEST (UTC+2)				Stadium: Benito Villamarín

5 September 2010 2	Granada	0–1	Valladolid	Granada
CEST (UTC+2)				Stadium: Nuevo Los Cármenes

11 September 2010 3	Albacete	2–1	Granada	Albacete
CEST (UTC+2)				Stadium: Carlos Belmonte

19 September 2010 4	Granada	2–0	Ponferradina	Granada
CEST (UTC+2)				Stadium: Nuevo Los Cármenes

25 September 2010 5	Las Palmas	1–1	Granada	Las Palmas
CEST (UTC+2)				Stadium: Estadio Gran Canaria

3 October 2010 6	Granada	2–1	Girona	Granada
CEST (UTC+2)				Stadium: Nuevo Los Cármenes

10 October 2010 7	Salamanca	1–2	Granada	Villares de la Reina
CEST (UTC+2)				Stadium: Helmántico Stadium

17 October 2010 8	Granada	1–1	Rayo Vallecano	Granada
CEST (UTC+2)				Stadium: Nuevo Los Cármenes

23 October 2010 9	Celta Vigo	1–1	Granada	Vigo
CEST (UTC+2)				Stadium: Balaídos

30 October 2010 10	Granada	5–0	Xerez	Granada
CEST (UTC+2)				Stadium: Nuevo Los Cármenes

6 November 2010 11	Cartagena	2–1	Granada	Cartagena
CET (UTC+1)				Stadium: Cartagonova

13 November 2010 12	Granada	4–1	Barcelona B	Granada
CET (UTC+1)				Stadium: Nuevo Los Cármenes

21 November 2010 13	Numancia	3–2	Granada	Soria
CET (UTC+1)				Stadium: Nuevo Estadio Los Pajaritos

28 November 2010 14	Granada	1–1	Córdoba	Granada
CET (UTC+1)				Stadium: Nuevo Los Cármenes

12 December 2010 16	Granada	6–1	Gimnàstic	Granada
CET (UTC+1)				Stadium: Nuevo Los Cármenes

18 December 2010 17	Huesca	0–0	Granada	Huesca
CET (UTC+1)				Stadium: El Alcoraz

2 January 2011 18	Granada	1–0	Alcorcón	Granada
CET (UTC+1)				Stadium: Nuevo Los Cármenes

7 January 2011 19	Villarreal B	2–1	Granada	Villarreal
CET (UTC+1)				Referee: Miranda Torres

16 January 2011 20	Elche	0–0	Granada	Elche
CET (UTC+1)				Stadium: Martínez Valero

22 January 2011 21	Granada	2–1	Recreativo	Granada
CET (UTC+1)				Stadium: Nuevo Los Cármenes

26 January 2011 15	Tenerife	2–2	Granada	Santa Cruz de Tenerife
CET (UTC+1)				Stadium: Heliodoro Rodríguez López

30 January 2011 22	Granada	3–0	Real Betis	Granada
CET (UTC+1)				Stadium: Nuevo Los Cármenes

5 February 2011 23	Valladolid	2–3	Granada	Valladolid
CET (UTC+1)				Stadium: José Zorrilla; Referee: Amoedo Chas

11 February 2011 24	Granada	3–0	Albacete	Granada
CET (UTC+1)				Stadium: Nuevo Los Cármenes; Referee: Piñeiro Crespo

20 February 2011 25	Ponferradina	0–0	Granada	Ponferrada
CET (UTC+1)				Stadium: El Toralín

26 February 2011 26	Granada	5–2	Las Palmas	Granada
CET (UTC+1)				Stadium: Nuevo Los Cármenes

1 March 2011 27	Girona	2–0	Granada	Girona
CET (UTC+1)				Stadium: Montilivi

5 March 2011 28	Granada	0–1	Salamanca	Granada
CET (UTC+1)				Stadium: Nuevo Los Cármenes

13 March 2011 29	Rayo Vallecano	1–1	Granada	Madrid
CET (UTC+1)				Stadium: Vallecas; Referee: Valdés Aller

20 March 2011 30	Granada	1–1	Celta Vigo	Granada
CET (UTC+1)				Stadium: Nuevo Los Cármenes

27 March 2011 31	Xerez	1–1	Granada	Jerez de la Frontera
CET (UTC+1)				Stadium: Estadio Municipal de Chapín

2 April 2011 32	Granada	2–1	Cartagena	Granada
CEST (UTC+2)				Stadium: Nuevo Los Cármenes; Referee: Santiago Jaime Latre

8 April 2011 33	Barcelona B	4–0	Granada	Barcelona
CEST (UTC+2)				Stadium: Mini Estadi

16 April 2011 34	Granada	2–0	Numancia	Granada
CEST (UTC+2)				Stadium: Nuevo Los Cármenes

23 April 2011 35	Córdoba	1–1	Granada	Córdoba
CEST (UTC+2)				Stadium: Estadio Nuevo Arcángel

1 May 2011 36	Granada	2–1	Tenerife	Granada
CEST (UTC+2)				Stadium: Nuevo Los Cármenes

8 May 2011 37	Gimnàstic	0–3	Granada	Tarragona
CEST (UTC+2)				Stadium: Nou Estadi de Tarragona

12 May 2011 38	Granada	2–0	Huesca	Granada
CEST (UTC+2)				Stadium: Nuevo Los Cármenes

15 May 2011 39	Alcorcón	2–0	Granada	Alcorcón
CEST (UTC+2)				Stadium: Estadio Municipal de Santo Domingo; Referee: Valdés Aller

20 May 2011 40	Granada	3–0	Villarreal B	Granada
CEST (UTC+2)				Stadium: Nuevo Los Cármenes; Referee: Prieto Iglesias

29 May 2011 41	Granada	3–3	Elche	Granada
CEST (UTC+2)				Stadium: Nuevo Los Cármenes; Referee: Miranda Torres

4 June 2011 42	Recreativo	0–0	Granada	Huelva
CEST (UTC+2)				Stadium: Estadio Nuevo Colombino; Referee: Ocón Arraiz

=== Copa del Rey ===
1 September 2010 Second round	Albacete	0–2	Granada	Albacete
21:30 CEST (UTC+2)			Geijo 40', 43'	Stadium: Estadio Carlos Belmonte; Referee: Jorge Valdés Aller

8 September 2010 Third round	Granada	2–2 (a.e.t.) (4–5 p)	Real Betis	Granada
21:00 CEST (UTC+2)	Benítez 38' (pen.), 46'		Emana 62'; Castro 73'	Stadium: Nuevo Los Cármenes; Referee: José Luis Lesma López
	Penalties
	Pérez (penalty scored); Lucena (penalty scored); Barrancos (penalty scored); Geijo (penalty missed); Muriel (penalty scored)		(penalty scored) Caffa; (penalty scored) Sevilla; (penalty scored) Castro; (penalty scored) Emana; (penalty scored) Dorado
