= 2011–12 Granada CF season =

Granada
2011–12 season
- President: Quique Pina
- Head coach: Fabri González
- Stadium: Nuevo Los Cármenes
- La Liga: 17th
- Copa del Rey: Round of 32
- Top goalscorer: League: Guilherme Siqueira (6); All: Guilherme Siqueira (7)
- Highest home attendance: 22,524
- Lowest home attendance: 16,000

The 2011–12 season was the 78th season in Granada CF's history and their 18th season in La Liga, the top division of Spanish football. It covered a period from 1 July 2011 to 30 June 2012.

Granada finished the season in 17th place in the league, managing to stay in the top flight of the Spanish football. It entered the Copa del Rey in the Round of 32 where it lost to Real Sociedad 3–5 on aggregate.

== Players ==
=== Squad information ===
| N | Pos. | Nat. | Name | Age | EU | Since | App | Goals | Ends | Transfer fee | Notes |
|---|---|---|---|---|---|---|---|---|---|---|---|
| 1 | GK | (Spain) | José Juan | 46 | EU | 2009 | 22 | 0 | 2012 | Free | |
| 2 | RB | (Cameroon) | Allan Nyom | 38 | EU | 2009 | 88 | 1 | 2014 | Free | on loan from Udinese |
| 3 | CB | (France) | Noé Pamarot | 47 | EU | 2011 | 3 | 0 | 2013 | Free | |
| 4 | CM | (Spain) | Fran Rico | 39 | EU | 2011 | 10 | 1 | 2015 | €1M | |
| 5 | CB | (Spain) | Diego Mainz (vice-captain) | 43 | EU | 2009 | 76 | 8 | 2012 | Free | on loan from Udinese |
| 6 | LB | (Brazil) | Guilherme Siqueira | 40 | EU | 2010 | 53 | 3 | 2015 | Free | Second nationality: Italy |
| 7 | CF | (Nigeria) | Odion Ighalo | 37 | Non-EU | 2010 (Winter) | 64 | 23 | 2012 | Free | on loan from Udinese |
| 8 | CB | (Spain) | Íñigo López | 44 | EU | 2010 | 49 | 2 | 2012 | €100K | |
| 9 | CM | (France) | Yohan Mollo | 37 | EU | 2011 | 7 | 0 | 2015 | €1M | |
| 10 | AM | (Spain) | Jaime Romero | 36 | EU | 2011 | 8 | 0 | 2012 | Free | on loan from Udinese |
| 11 | LW | (Spain) | Dani Benítez | 39 | EU | 2009 | 90 | 19 | 2012 | Free | on loan from Udinese |
| 12 | RW | (Argentina) | Franco Jara | 38 | Non-EU | 2011 | 14 | 0 | 2012 | Free | on loan from Benfica |
| 13 | GK | (Spain) | Roberto | 47 | EU | 2010 | 60 | 0 | 2013 | Free | |
| 14 | AM | (Spain) | Mikel Rico | 42 | EU | 2010 | 62 | 3 | 2013 | €400K | |
| 15 | CB | (Senegal) | Pape Diakhaté | 42 | EU | 2011 | 9 | 0 | 2016 | €4.5M | Second nationality: France |
| 16 | LW | (Portugal) | Jorge Ribeiro | 45 | EU | 2011 | 1 | 0 | 2013 | Free | |
| 17 | CM | (Portugal) | Carlos Martins | 44 | EU | 2011 | 12 | 1 | 2012 | Free | on loan from Benfica |
| 18 | CB | (Spain) | Manuel Lucena (captain) | 43 | EU | 2002 | 243 | 21 | 2013 | Free | |
| 19 | CM | (Algeria) | Hassan Yebda | 42 | EU | 2011 | 11 | 0 | 2014 | Free | Second nationality: France |
| 20 | CF | (Nigeria) | Ikechukwu Uche | 42 | Non-EU | 2011 | 17 | 1 | 2012 | Free | on loan from Villarreal |
| 21 | RB | (Spain) | David Cortés | 47 | EU | 2011 | 4 | 0 | 2013 | Free | |
| 22 | CF | (Switzerland) | Álex Geijo | 44 | EU | 2010 | 50 | 28 | 2012 | Free | on loan from Udinese |
| 23 | DM | (Spain) | Abel | 44 | EU | 2010 | 63 | 4 | 2012 | Free | |
| 24 | DM | (Spain) | Moisés Hurtado | 45 | EU | 2011 | 7 | 0 | 2013 | Free | |
| 25 | GK | (Brazil) | Júlio César | 40 | EU | 2011 | 1 | 0 | 2012 | Free | on loan from Benfica / Second nat.: Italy |
| 26 | CM | (Ghana) | Richard Boateng | 34 | Non-EU | 2011 | 0 | 0 | 2012 | Free | |

- Last updated: 21 December 2011
- Source: Granadacf.es, Players transfer, Wikipedia players' articles (for player numbers, appearances, and goals)
- Ordered by squad number.

=== Out on loan ===
Note: Flags indicate national team as defined under FIFA eligibility rules; some limited exceptions apply. Players may hold more than one non-FIFA nationality.

| No. | Pos. | Nation | Player |
|---|---|---|---|
| — | DF | ESP | David de Coz (at Cádiz) |
| — | DF | COL | Jeison Murillo (at Cádiz) |
| — | MF | ESP | Pedro Barrancos (at Cádiz) |
| — | MF | ESP | Goku (at Burgos) |
| — | MF | ESP | Toti (at Cádiz) |

| No. | Pos. | Nation | Player |
|---|---|---|---|
| — | FW | NGR | Kabiru Akinsola (at Cádiz) |
| — | FW | SCO | Ikechi Anya (at Cádiz) |
| — | FW | ESP | Álex Cruz (at Sabadell) |
| — | FW | CHI | Fabián Orellana (at Celta Vigo) |
| — | FW | ESP | Juanjo (at Cádiz) |

== Club ==
=== Coaching staff ===
| Position | Staff |
|---|---|
| Head coach | Fabri González |
| Assistant coach | Javi García |
| Fitness coaches | José Alfonso Morcillo |
| Goalkeepers coach | Iñaki García |
| Team delegate | Pedro David "Peki" Navarro |
| Match delegate | Ángel González Segura |
| Equipment managers | Jesús Pérez, Antonio Hidalgo |

Source: Granadacf.es

=== Team stats ===
| No. | Pos. | Name | La Liga | | | Copa del Rey | | | Total | | | Discipline | | |
| No. | Pos. | Name | Apps | Ass | Goals | Apps | Ass | Goals | Apps | Ass | Goals | Yellow card | Yellow-red card | Red card |
|---|---|---|---|---|---|---|---|---|---|---|---|---|---|---|
| 1 | GK | (Spain) José Juan | 0 | 0 | 0 | 0 | 0 | 0 | 0 | 0 | 0 | 0 | 0 | 0 |
| 13 | GK | (Spain) Roberto | 16 | 0 | 0 | 1 | 0 | 0 | 17 | 0 | 0 | 3 | 0 | 0 |
| 25 | GK | (Brazil) Júlio César | 0 | 0 | 0 | 1 | 0 | 0 | 1 | 0 | 0 | 0 | 0 | 0 |
| 2 | DF | (Cameroon) Allan Nyom | 15 | 0 | 0 | 1 | 0 | 0 | 16 | 0 | 0 | 5 | 0 | 0 |
| 3 | DF | (France) Noé Pamarot | 2 | 0 | 0 | 1 | 0 | 0 | 3 | 0 | 0 | 1 | 0 | 0 |
| 5 | DF | (Spain) Diego Mainz | 11 | 0 | 0 | 0 | 0 | 0 | 11 | 0 | 0 | 2 | 0 | 0 |
| 6 | DF | (Brazil) Guilherme Siqueira | 16 | 1 | 2 | 2 | 0 | 1 | 18 | 1 | 3 | 4 | 0 | 0 |
| 8 | DF | (Spain) Iñigo López | 11 | 0 | 1 | 1 | 0 | 0 | 12 | 0 | 1 | 0 | 0 | 0 |
| 15 | DF | (Senegal) Pape Diakhaté | 8 | 0 | 0 | 0 | 0 | 0 | 8 | 0 | 0 | 1 | 0 | 0 |
| 16 | DF | (Portugal) Jorge Ribeiro | 0 | 0 | 0 | 1 | 0 | 0 | 1 | 0 | 0 | 0 | 0 | 0 |
| 18 | DF | (Spain) Manuel Lucena | 1 | 0 | 0 | 1 | 0 | 0 | 2 | 0 | 0 | 0 | 0 | 0 |
| 21 | DF | (Spain) David Cortés | 3 | 0 | 0 | 1 | 0 | 0 | 4 | 0 | 0 | 2 | 0 | 0 |
| 4 | MF | (Spain) Fran Rico | 9 | 0 | 1 | 1 | 0 | 0 | 10 | 0 | 1 | 4 | 0 | 0 |
| 9 | MF | (France) Yohan Mollo | 6 | 0 | 0 | 1 | 0 | 0 | 7 | 0 | 0 | 0 | 0 | 0 |
| 10 | MF | (Spain) Jaime Romero | 6 | 0 | 0 | 2 | 0 | 0 | 8 | 0 | 0 | 0 | 1 | 0 |
| 11 | MF | (Spain) Dani Benítez | 13 | 0 | 0 | 2 | 2 | 0 | 15 | 2 | 0 | 2 | 1 | 0 |
| 14 | MF | (Spain) Mikel Rico | 14 | 1 | 1 | 2 | 0 | 0 | 16 | 1 | 1 | 1 | 0 | 0 |
| 17 | MF | (Portugal) Carlos Martins | 12 | 1 | 1 | 0 | 0 | 0 | 12 | 1 | 1 | 3 | 0 | 0 |
| 19 | MF | (Algeria) Hassan Yebda | 11 | 0 | 0 | 0 | 0 | 0 | 11 | 0 | 0 | 3 | 0 | 0 |
| 23 | MF | (Spain) Abel | 16 | 0 | 1 | 1 | 0 | 0 | 17 | 0 | 1 | 0 | 0 | 0 |
| 24 | MF | (Spain) Moisés Hurtado | 5 | 0 | 0 | 1 | 0 | 0 | 6 | 0 | 0 | 2 | 0 | 0 |
| 26 | MF | (Ghana) Richard Boateng | 0 | 0 | 0 | 0 | 0 | 0 | 0 | 0 | 0 | 0 | 0 | 0 |
| 7 | FW | (Nigeria) Odion Ighalo | 9 | 1 | 1 | 1 | 0 | 0 | 10 | 1 | 1 | 1 | 0 | 0 |
| 12 | FW | (Argentina) Franco Jara | 12 | 2 | 0 | 2 | 0 | 0 | 14 | 2 | 0 | 3 | 0 | 0 |
| 20 | FW | (Nigeria) Ikechukwu Uche | 15 | 0 | 1 | 1 | 0 | 0 | 16 | 0 | 1 | 2 | 0 | 0 |
| 22 | FW | (Switzerland) Álex Geijo | 12 | 0 | 1 | 2 | 0 | 2 | 14 | 0 | 3 | 1 | 0 | 0 |

Las updated: 21 December 2011

== Pre-season ==
| 21 July 2011 I Trofeo Hoteles M.A. | Granada | 1–0 | Atlético Madrid | Granada |
| 21:00 (CEST) | Romero | Report | | Stadium: Los Cármenes; Attendance: 8,000; Referee: Chávez García |

| 21 July 2011 I Trofeo Hoteles M.A. | Granada | 0–0 (aet) (4–3 p) | Beşiktaş | Granada |
| 23:00 (CEST) | | Report | | Stadium: Los Cármenes; Attendance: 8,000; Referee: David Fernández Borbalán |
| | Penalties |
| | Felipe (penalty scored); Benítez (penalty scored); F. Rico (penalty missed); Calvo (penalty scored) | | Almeida (penalty scored); Fernandes (penalty scored); Hološko (penalty missed); Kavlak (penalty missed) |

| 27 July 2011 III Memorial M.Prieto | Maracena | 0–4 | Granada | Maracena |
| 21:15 (CEST) | | Report | Alonso 16'; Goku 19'; Calvo 32' (pen.); Ighalo 72' | Stadium: Ciudad Deportiva; Attendance: 15,000; Referee: José Paradas Romero |

| 30 July 2011 Friendly | Jaén | 1–2 | Granada | Jaén |
| 21:00 (CEST) | Cascón 3' | Report | Servando 77' (o.g.); Fabios 84' (o.g.) | Stadium: La Victoria; Attendance: 2,000; Referee: Ramón del Olmo Codes |

| 3 August 2011 Triangular Friendly | Lorca | 0–1 | Granada | Lorca |
| 20:00 (CEST) | | Report | Ighalo 29' | Stadium: Francisco Artés Carrasco; Attendance: 600; Referee: Romero Pérez |

| 3 August 2011 Triangular Friendly | Totana | 0–4 | Granada | Lorca |
| 21:00 (CEST) | | Report | Ikechi 2'; Alonso 15'; Ikechi 25'; Felipe 45' | Stadium: Francisco Artés Carrasco; Attendance: 600; Referee: Villalba Gabaldón |

| 6 August 2011 Friendly | Almería | 1–1 | Granada | La Manga |
| 19:00 (CEST) | Ulloa | Report | Boateng | Stadium: Complejo Hyatt de La Manga |

| 10 August 2011 Friendly | Hércules | 0–1 | Granada | La Manga |
| 19:00 (CEST) | | Report | Ighalo 32' | Stadium: Complejo Hyatt de La Manga; Attendance: 100; Referee: López Martínez |

| 12 August 2011 Friendly | Cádiz | 4–2 | Granada | La Manga |
| 18:30 (CEST) | Góngonra 11'; Goikoetxea 41'; Akinsola 66'; Barrancos 74' | Report | Romero 28'; Lucena 61' | Stadium: Complejo Hyatt de La Manga; Referee: Nicolás Espejo |

== Friendlies ==
| 5 October 2011 Friendly | Loja | 2–3 | Granada | Loja |
| 21:00 (CEST) | Álvaro Santos 19'; David Gámiz 72' | Report | Abel 37'; Geijo 40'; Lucena 50' | Stadium: Medina Lauxa; Attendance: 1,250; Referee: Jacob Yáñez Megías |

== Competitions ==
=== La Liga ===
==== League table ====
| Pos | Team | Pld | W | D | L | GF | GA | GD | Pts | Qualification or relegation |
|---|---|---|---|---|---|---|---|---|---|---|
| 15 | Rayo Vallecano | 38 | 13 | 4 | 21 | 53 | 73 | −20 | 43 (Note: RVA 0–0 ZAR; ZAR 1–2 RVA) | |
| 16 | Zaragoza | 38 | 12 | 7 | 19 | 36 | 61 | −25 | 43 | |
| 17 | Granada | 38 | 12 | 6 | 20 | 35 | 56 | −21 | 42 | |
| 18 | Villarreal (R) | 38 | 9 | 14 | 15 | 39 | 53 | −14 | 41 | Relegation to the Segunda División |
| 19 | Sporting Gijón (R) | 38 | 10 | 7 | 21 | 42 | 69 | −27 | 37 | Relegation to the Segunda División |

Source: ESPN
Rules for classification: 1st points; 2nd head-to-head points; 3rd head-to-head goal difference; 4th head-to-head goals scored; 5th goal difference; 6th number of goals scored; 7th Fair-play points
(R) Relegated

==== Results summary ====
| Overall | | | | | | | | Home | | | | | | Away | | | | | |
| Pld | W | D | L | GF | GA | GD | Pts | W | D | L | GF | GA | GD | W | D | L | GF | GA | GD |
|---|---|---|---|---|---|---|---|---|---|---|---|---|---|---|---|---|---|---|---|
| 38 | 12 | 6 | 20 | 35 | 56 | −21 | 42 | 7 | 5 | 6 | 20 | 19 | +1 | 5 | 1 | 14 | 15 | 37 | −22 |

Last updated: 13 May 2012.
Source: Competitive matches

==== Results by round ====
| Round | 2 | 3 | 4 | 5 | 6 | 7 | 8 | 9 | 10 | 11 | 12 | 13 | 14 | 15 | 16 | 17 | 18 | 19 | 1 | 21 | 22 | 23 | 24 | 25 | 26 | 27 | 28 | 29 | 29 | 31 | 32 | 33 | 34 | 35 | 36 | 20 | 37 | 38 |
|---|---|---|---|---|---|---|---|---|---|---|---|---|---|---|---|---|---|---|---|---|---|---|---|---|---|---|---|---|---|---|---|---|---|---|---|---|---|---|
| Ground | H | A | H | A | H | A | H | A | H | A | H | H | A | H | A | H | A | H | A | A | H | A | H | A | H | A | H | A | H | A | A | H | A | H | A | H | H | A |
| Result | L | L | W | L | D | L | D | L | L | W | D | D | W | W | L | W | W | L | L | W | W | W | L | W | L | L | L | W | L | L | W | D | D | L | W | L | L | L |
| Position | 17 | 20 | 15 | 16 | 17 | 19 | 18 | 18 | 20 | 19 | 19 | 17 | 16 | 12 | 15 | 13 | 13 | 17 | 17 | 17 | 17 | 17 | 17 | 17 | 17 | 17 | 17 | 17 | 17 | 17 | 17 | 17 | 17 | 17 | 17 | 17 | 17 | 17 |

Source: La Liga
A = Away; H = Home; W = Win; D = Draw; L = Loss

==== Matches ====
| 27 August 2011 2 | Granada | 0–1 | Real Betis | Granada |
| 22:00 (CEST) | Pamarot (yellow card) 5'; Benítez (yellow card) 34' | Report | 87' Castro; (yellow card) 15' Iriney; (yellow card) 54' Dorado | Stadium: Nuevo Los Cármenes; Attendance: 16,000; Referee: Miguel Pérez Lasa |

| 12 September 2011 3 | Málaga | 4–0 | Granada | Málaga |
| 21:00 (CEST) | Cazorla 3', 48'; Joaquín 24', 72', (yellow card) 72'; Duda (yellow card) 50' | Report | (yellow card) 55' Jara; (yellow card) 64' Martins | Stadium: La Rosaleda; Attendance: 28,000; Referee: Miguel Ayza Gámez |

| 17 September 2011 4 | Granada | 1–0 | Villarreal | Granada |
| 18:00 (CEST) | Uche 55'; Martins (yellow card) 6'; Yebda (yellow card) 16'; Hurtado (yellow card) 26'; Mainz (yellow card) 50'; M. Rico (yellow card) 75'; Diakhaté (yellow card) 77'; Nyom (yellow card) 89' | Report | (yellow card) 35' Catalá; (yellow card) 89' Musacchio | Stadium: Nuevo Los Cármenes; Attendance: 20,000; Referee: Xavier Estrada Fernández |

| 21 September 2011 5 | Real Sociedad | 1–0 | Granada | San Sebastián |
| 20:00 (CEST) | Estrada (yellow card) 58', (goal) 64'; Agirretxe (yellow card) 17'; Griezmann (yellow card) 77'; Illarramendi (yellow card) 78'; I. Martínez (yellow card) 78' | (Report) | (yellow card) 32' Siqueira; (yellow card) 54' Jara | Stadium: Anoeta; Referee: Alfonso Álvarez Izquierdo |

| 25 September 2011 6 | Granada | 1–1 | Osasuna | Granada |
| 18:00 (CEST) | F. Rico 63', (yellow card) 70'; Yebda (yellow card) 41'; Hurtado (yellow card) 44' | Report | 28' García; (yellow card) 26' Rubén; (yellow card) 34' Damià; (yellow card) 56' Sola | Stadium: Nuevo Los Cármenes; Attendance: 21,000; Referee: José Teixeira Vitienes |

| 1 October 2011 7 | Valencia | 1–0 | Granada | Valencia |
| 20:00 (CEST) | Canales 4'; Mathieu (yellow card) 66'; Jonas (yellow card) 89' | Report | | Stadium: Mestalla; Attendance: 36,000; Referee: Eduardo Iturralde González |

| 15 October 2011 8 | Granada | 0–0 | Atlético Madrid | Granada |
| 22:00 (CEST) | F. Rico (yellow card) 24'; Martins (yellow card) 41'; Nyom (yellow card) 67'; Roberto (yellow card) 75' | Report | (yellow card) 27' Gabi; (yellow card) 49' Tiago; (yellow card) 52' Juanfran; (yellow card) 75' Miranda; (yellow card) 78' Assunção | Stadium: Nuevo Los Cármenes; Attendance: 21,800; Referee: Javier Turienzo Álvarez |

| 22 October 2011 9 | Sporting Gijón | 2–0 | Granada | Gijón |
| 18:00 (CEST) | Barral 5', (yellow card) 68'; De las Cuevas (yellow card) 28'; Castro 41' | Report | (yellow card) 21' Nyom | Stadium: El Molinón; Referee: Ignacio Iglesias Villanueva |

| 25 October 2011 10 | Granada | 0–1 | Barcelona | Granada |
| 20:00 (CEST) | Uche (yellow card) 2'; Romero (yellow card) 33' (red card) 53'; F. Rico (yellow card) 34'; Benítez (yellow card) 62' (red card) 89'; Nyom (yellow card) 86' | Report | (yellow card) 26' Alves; 32' Xavi; (yellow card) 61' Busquets; (yellow card) 65' Cuenca; (yellow card) 89' Keita | Stadium: Nuevo Los Cármenes; Attendance: 22,000; Referee: César Muñiz Fernández |

| 31 October 2011 11 | Sevilla | 1–2 | Granada | Seville |
| 21:00 (CEST) | Manu 1'; Medel (yellow card) 28' | Report | (yellow card) 6' Siqueira; 78' Geijo; 87' M. Rico | Stadium: Ramón Sánchez Pizjuán; Attendance: 38,000; Referee: Antonio Mateu Lahoz |

| 6 November 2011 12 | Granada | 0–0 | Racing Santander | Granada |
| 16:00 (CEST) | F. Rico (yellow card) 34'; Roberto (yellow card) 36'; Uche (yellow card) 38'; Mainz (yellow card) 60' | Report | (yellow card) 43' Arana; (yellow card) 51' Munitis; (yellow card) 64' Cisma; (red card) 87' Nahuelpan; (yellow card) 88' Toño; (yellow card) 89' Francis | Stadium: Nuevo Los Cármenes; Attendance: 22,524; Referee: Carlos Velasco Carballo |

| 20 November 2011 13 | Granada | 2–1 | Mallorca | Granada |
| 22:00 (CEST) | Benítez (yellow card) 17'; Jara (yellow card) 39'; Siqueira 54'; Martins 58', (yellow card) 59' | Report | 22' Víctor; (yellow card) 48' Nsue | Stadium: Nuevo Los Cármenes; Attendance: 22,524; Referee: Carlos Clos Gómez |
Note: Called off mid-way through the second half after an assistant referee was hit by an umbrella thrown from the crowd.

| 27 November 2011 14 | Athletic Bilbao | 0–1 | Granada | Bilbao |
| 19:45 (CEST) | Aurtenetxe (yellow card) 44'; Muniain (yellow card) 44' | Report | 31' López; (yellow card) 32' Nyom; (yellow card) 40' Yebda; (yellow card) 43' Siqueira; (yellow card) 84' Roberto | Stadium: San Mamés; Attendance: 36,000; Referee: Alberto Undiano Mallenco |

| 5 December 2011 15 | Granada | 1–0 | Zaragoza | Granada |
| 21:30 (CEST) | Ighalo 44'; Jara (yellow card) 16'; Cortés (yellow card) 22' | Report | (yellow card) 6' Zuculini; (yellow card) 26' Abraham | Stadium: Nuevo Los Cármenes; Attendance: 21,500; Referee: Carlos Delgado Ferreiro |

| 7 December 2011 13 | Granada | 2–2 | Mallorca | Granada |
| 19:30 (CEST) | Siqueira 54'; Martins 58'; Cortés (yellow card) 88' | Report | 22' Víctor; 65' Hemed; (yellow card) 75' Nunes; (yellow card) 75' Pablo | Stadium: Nuevo Los Cármenes; Attendance: 0 Referee: Carlos Clos Gómez |

| 11 December 2011 16 | Getafe | 1–0 | Granada | Getafe |
| 16:00 (CEST) | Casquero 77', (yellow card) 80'; Castro (yellow card) 34'; Míchel (yellow card) 57'; Valera (yellow card) 73' | Report | (yellow card) 67' Siqueira; (yellow card) 74' Ighalo | Stadium: Alfonso Pérez; Attendance: 10,500; Referee: José González González |

| 18 December 2011 17 | Granada | 2–1 | Levante | Granada |
| 16:00 (CEST) | Siqueira 33' (pen.); Abel 44'; Jara (yellow card) 73' | Report; Report 2 | 59' Koné; (yellow card) 31' Venta; (yellow card) 32' Barkero; (yellow card) 38' Juanfran; (yellow card) 80' Farinós; (yellow card) 89' Nano | Stadium: Nuevo Los Cármenes; Attendance: 21,500; Referee: Carlos del Cerro Grande |

| 7 January 2012 18 | Real Madrid | 5–1 | Granada | Madrid |
| 20:00 (CEST) | Benzema 19', 50'; Ramos 34'; Higuaín 47', (yellow card) 60'; Ronaldo 89' | Summary | M. Rico 22'; Roberto (yellow card) 24' | Stadium: Santiago Bernabéu; Attendance: 72,000; Referee: César Muñiz Fernández |

| 14 January 2012 19 | Granada | 1–2 | Rayo Vallecano | Granada |
| --:-- (CEST) | Geijo (yellow card) 60'; Nyom (yellow card) 61'; M. Rico (yellow card) 64'; Benítez (yellow card) 69'; Jara (yellow card) 72'; F. Rico 88'; López (red card) 90+3' | Summary | Michu 26'; Movilla (yellow card) 36'; Piti 53'; Casado (yellow card) 72'; Tamudo (yellow card) 73' | Stadium: Nuevo Los Cármenes; Attendance: 22,500; Referee: Miguel Ayza Gámez |

| 21 January 2012 1 | Espanyol | 3–0 | Granada | Cornellà de Llobregat |
| --:-- (CEST) | Baena 26', (yellow card) 77'; Verdú 45+1' (pen.); Fonte 80' | Summary | Nyom (yellow card) 45'; Jara (yellow card) 82'; Romero (yellow card) 85' | Stadium: Cornellà-El Prat; Attendance: 18,000; Referee: Carlos del Cerro Grande |

| 29 January 2012 21 | Real Betis | 1–2 | Granada | Seville |
| --:-- (CEST) | Sevilla (yellow card) 19'; Pereira 81'; Nacho (yellow card) 88'; Mario (yellow card) 90' | Summary | Ighalo 13'; Yebda (yellow card) 21'; Carlos Martins 40'; Romero (yellow card) 80'; Ighalo (yellow card) 82'; Benítez (yellow card) 85'; López (yellow card) 88'; Júlio César (yellow card) 90+4' | Stadium: Benito Villamarín; Attendance: 32,000; Referee: Javier Turienzo Álvarez |

| 6 February 2012 22 | Granada | 2–1 | Málaga | Granada |
| 21:00 (CEST) | M. Rico (yellow card) 22'; Gómez (yellow card) 31'; Yebda (yellow card) 45+2'; Ighalo 57'; Nyom (yellow card) 75'; López 81' | Report | Gámez (yellow card) 13'; Rondón 68'; Demichelis (red card) 84' | Stadium: Nuevo Los Cármenes; Attendance: 15,000; Referee: Antonio Mateu Lahoz |

| 12 February 2012 23 | Villarreal | 3–1 | Granada | Villarreal |
| 19:45 (CEST) | Ruben 16'; Cani (yellow card) 53'; Valero 64'; Júlio César 73' (o.g.); Marchena (yellow card) 90+1' | Report | Ighalo (yellow card) 30'; Jara (yellow card) 32'; López 50'; Diakhaté (yellow card) 71' (yellow-red card) 88' | Stadium: El Madrigal; Attendance: 21,000; Referee: Miguel Pérez Laza |

| 19 February 2012 24 | Granada | 4–1 | Real Sociedad | Granada |
| 12:00 (CEST) | López 12', (yellow card) 45+2'; F. Rico (yellow card) 45+1'; Siqueira (yellow card) 49' (yellow-red card) 86'; Jara 57'; Uche 62', 87' | Report | González 10'; Llorente (yellow card) 14'; I. Martínez (yellow card) 15'; Illarramendi (red card) 45'; Cadamuro-Bentaïba (yellow card) 77'; Ifrán (yellow card) 78' | Stadium: Nuevo Los Cármenes; Attendance: 21,000; Referee: Fernando Teixeira Vitienes |

| 26 February 2012 25 | Osasuna | 2–1 | Granada | Pamplona |
| 18:00 (CEST) | Nekounam 26', (yellow card) 84'; Lekić 29'; Puñal (yellow card) 34' (yellow-red card) 74'; Lolo (yellow card) 83'; García (yellow card) 90+4' | Summary | M. Rico 31'; Jara (yellow card) 34'; Martins (yellow card) 79'; Henrique (yellow card) 88'; Roberto (yellow card) 90+3' | Stadium: El Sadar; Attendance: 18,000; Referee: Xavier Estrada Fernández |

| 4 March 2012 26 | Granada | 0–1 | Valencia | Granada |
| 18:00 (CEST) | Benítez (yellow card) 34'; F. Rico (yellow card) 90'; Jara (yellow card) 90'; Siqueira (yellow card) 90+6' | Report | Feghouli (yellow card) 17', (goal) 32'; T. Costa (yellow card) 40'; Rami (yellow card) 51'; Soldado (yellow card) 53'; Alba (yellow card) 66'; Ruiz (yellow card) 68'; Mathieu (yellow card) 74'; Topal (yellow card) 81' | Stadium: Nuevo Los Cármenes; Attendance: 12,000; Referee: Eduardo Iturralde González |

| 11 March 2011 27 | Atlético Madrid | 2–0 | Granada | Madrid |
| 12:00 (CEST) | Miranda 38'; Koke (yellow card) 60'; Godín (yellow card) 73'; Falcao 90+1' | Report | Nyom (yellow card) 53'; Gómez (yellow card) 63'; Henrique (red card) 83' | Stadium: Vicente Calderón; Attendance: 45,000; Referee: Antonio Mateu Lahoz |

| 17 March 2012 28 | Granada | 2–1 | Sporting Gijón | Granada |
| 18:00 (CEST) | Martins 3', (red card) 90+4'; Siqueira 24' | Report | Gálvez (yellow card) 55'; Colunga 90+3' | Stadium: Nuevo Los Cármenes; Attendance: 12,000; Referee: Miguel Pérez Lasa |

| 20 March 2012 29 | Barcelona | 5–3 | Granada | Barcelona |
| 21:00 (CEST) | Xavi 4'; Messi 17', 67', 86'; Keita (yellow card) 48'; Alves (yellow card) 61' (yellow-red card) 88'; Tello 82'; Mascherano (yellow card) 89' | Report | Ighalo (yellow card) 10'; Bénitez (yellow card) 34'; Mainz 55'; Cortés (yellow card) 59'; Siqueira 62' (pen.), 89' (pen.); Hurtado (yellow card) 64'; Gómez (yellow card) 66'; Geijo (yellow card) 90+1'; Abel (yellow card) 90+3' | Stadium: Camp Nou; Attendance: 62,401; Referee: José Teixeira Vitienes |

| 26 March 2012 30 | Granada | 0–3 | Sevilla | Granada |
| 21:00 (CEST) | Gómez (yellow card) 8'; Benítez (yellow card) 35'; Jara (yellow card) 38'; Nyom (yellow card) 84' | Report | Manu (yellow card) 16', (goal) 54', 90+4'; Negredo 39'; Navarro (yellow card) 66'; Coke (yellow card) 70'; Medel (yellow card) 85' | Stadium: Nuevo Los Cármenes; Attendance: 16,000; Referee: César Muñiz Fernández |

| 31 March 2012 31 | Racing Santander | 0–1 | Granada | Santander |
| 18:00 (CEST) | Colsa (yellow card) 40'; Cisma (yellow card) 69'; Bernardo (yellow card) 88'; Fernández (yellow card) 88' | Report | Mainz (yellow card) 55'; Roberto (yellow card) 76'; Siqueira 89' (pen.) | Stadium: El Sardinero; Attendance: 15,960; Referee: Miguel Ayza Gámez |

| 8 April 2012 32 | Mallorca | 0–0 | Granada | Palma |
| 16:00 (CEST) | Flores (yellow card) 10'; Tejera (yellow card) 63'; Pereira (yellow card) 68'; Cendrós (yellow card) 71' | Report | Hurtado (yellow card) 32' | Stadium: Iberostar; Attendance: 13,000; Referee: Carlos Delgado Ferreiro |

| 11 April 2012 33 | Granada | 2–2 | Athletic Bilbao | Granada |
| 20:00 (CEST) | Romero 2', (red card) 39'; Nyom (yellow card) 63'; Geijo 74'; Gómez (yellow card) 87' | Report | Iturraspe (yellow card) 48'; Amorebieta (yellow card) 60'; Llorente 81'; Susaeta 87'; De Marcos (yellow card) 90+2' | Stadium: Nuevo Los Cármenes; Attendance: 22,500; Referee: Alberto Undiano Mallenco |

| 15 April 2012 34 | Zaragoza | 1–0 | Granada | Zaragoza |
| 16:00 (CEST) | Dujmović 6'; Álvarez (yellow card) 59'; Da Silva (yellow card) 80'; Paredes (yellow card) 82' | Report | Geijo (yellow card) 30'; Nyom (yellow card) 63'; Jara (yellow card) 87' | Stadium: La Romareda; Attendance: 24,000; Referee: Carlos del Cerro Grande |

| 22 April 2012 35 | Granada | 1–0 | Getafe | Granada |
| 12:00 (CEST) | Gómez (yellow card) 6'; Jara 18'; Benítez (yellow card) 31' | Report | Ríos (yellow card) 36'; Güiza (yellow card) 90+2' | Stadium: Nuevo Los Cármenes; Attendance: 21,000; Referee: Miguel Ayza Gámez |

| 28 April 2012 36 | Levante | 3–1 | Granada | Valencia |
| 18:00 (CEST) | Koné 46', (yellow card) 47'; Torres 73'; Valdo 84' | Report | Geijo (yellow card) 45+2'; López (yellow card) 50'; Ighalo 67'; Júlio César (yellow card) 83' | Stadium: Ciutat de València; Attendance: 15,000; Referee: José González González |

| 1 May 2012 20 | Granada | 2–1 | Espanyol | Granada |
| 18:00 (CEST) | Ighalo 29', 35' | Report | Vilà 54' | Stadium: Nuevo Los Cármenes; Attendance: 21,000; Referee: Antonio Mateu Lahoz |

| 5 May 2012 37 | Granada | 1–2 | Real Madrid | Granada |
| 21:00 (CEST) | Jara 5', (yellow card) 61'; Hurtado (yellow card) 79' (red card) 90+5'; Benítez (yellow card) 80'; Cortés (yellow card) 88'; Gómez (yellow card) 90+2'; Siqueira (red card) 90+5' | Report | Albiol (yellow card) 25'; Higuaín (yellow card) 65'; Alonso (yellow card) 72'; Marcelo (yellow card) 80'; Ronaldo 81' (pen.); Cortés 90+3' (o.g.) | Stadium: Nuevo Los Cármenes; Attendance: 22,000; Referee: Carlos Clos Gómez |

| 13 May 2012 38 | Rayo Vallecano | 1–0 | Granada | Madrid |
| 20:00 (CEST) | Casado (yellow card) 19'; Piti (yellow card) 85'; Tamudo 90+1', (yellow card) 90+2' | Report | | Stadium: Campo de Fútbol de Vallecas; Attendance: 10,000; Referee: Alberto Undiano Mallenco |

=== Copa del Rey ===
==== Round of 32 ====
| 13 December 2011 First leg | Real Sociedad | 4–1 | Granada | San Sebastián |
| 21:00 (CEST) | Griezmann 4'; Prieto 7', 63'; Ifrán 90'; Mariga (yellow card) 29' | Report | Geijo 72' | Stadium: Anoeta; Attendance: 18,000; Referee: Ayza Ayza Gámez |

| 21 December 2011 Second leg | Granada | 2–1 (3–5 agg.) | Real Sociedad | Granada |
| 21:00 (CET) | Siqueira 18' (pen.); Geijo 65', (yellow card) 89'; Benítez (yellow card) 86' | Report | I. Martínez (yellow card) 17'; Agirretxe 82' | Stadium: Nuevo Los Cármenes; Attendance: 18,000; Referee: Antonio Mateu Lahoz |

== See also ==
- 2011–12 Copa del Rey
- 2011–12 La Liga
