= Allan Nyom =

Cameroonian footballer (born 1988)

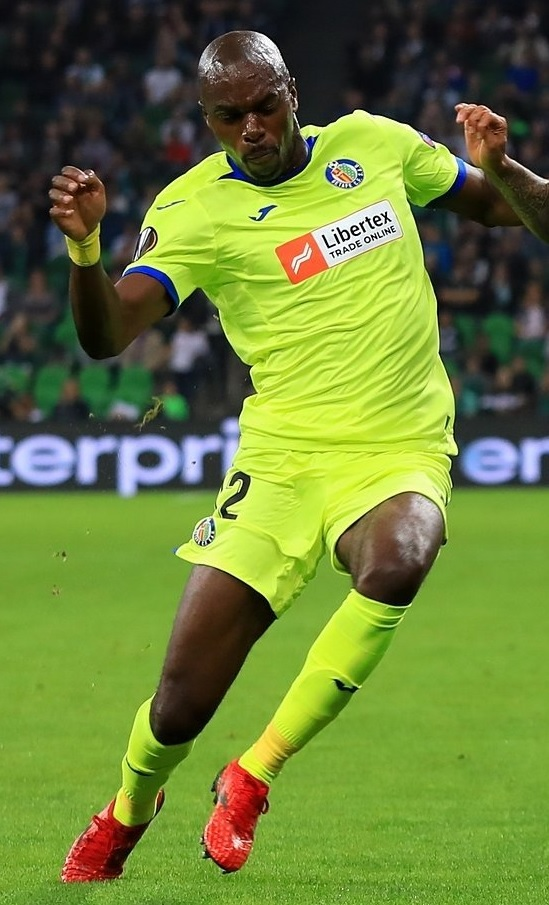
- Nyom playing for Getafe in 2019

Personal information
- Full name: Allan-Roméo Nyom
- Date of birth: 10 May 1988 (age 38)
- Place of birth: Neuilly-sur-Seine, France
- Height: 1.90 m (6 ft 3 in)
- Position: Right-back

Youth career
- Choisy-le-Roi
- 2005–2008: Nancy

Senior career*
Years	Team	Apps	(Gls)
2008–2009	Arles-Avignon	37	(0)
2009–2015	Udinese	0	(0)
2009–2015	→ Granada (loan)	204	(2)
2015–2016	Watford	32	(0)
2016–2019	West Bromwich Albion	63	(0)
2018–2019	→ Leganés (loan)	23	(1)
2019–2022	Getafe	70	(2)
2022–2024	Leganés	83	(2)
2024–2026	Getafe	35	(1)

International career^{‡}
2011–2019	Cameroon	18	(0)
- * Club domestic league appearances and goals as of 27 May 2026 ‡ National team caps and goals as of 12 October 2019

Allan-Roméo Nyom (born 10 May 1988) is a former professional footballer who played as a right-back.

He spent most of his career with Granada, appearing in 220 competitive games during six seasons, four in La Liga. He also played professionally in England, with Watford and West Bromwich Albion.

Born in France, Nyom has been a Cameroonian international since 2011. He represented the nation at the 2014 World Cup.

== Club career ==
=== Early years, Granada ===
Born in Neuilly-sur-Seine, France, Nyom only played amateur football in the country, competing in the reserves championship with AS Nancy-Lorraine and appearing for AC Arles-Avignon in the Championnat National. In the summer of 2009 he was signed by Udinese Calcio from Italy, and was immediately loaned to Granada CF in Spain as part of the partnership agreement between both clubs.

Nyom quickly became an undisputed first-choice with the Andalusia side, helping them promote from Segunda División B to La Liga in just two seasons. He made his debut in the latter competition on 27 August 2011, in a 0–1 home loss against neighbours Real Betis.

Nyom renewed his contract with Udinese in late May 2013, but continued playing with Granada. He scored his first and only goal in the Spanish top flight on 25 October 2014, putting the visitors ahead in a 1–1 draw at SD Eibar.

=== Watford ===
On 14 July 2015, Nyom signed for newly promoted Premier League team Watford on a four-year contract from Udinese. He made his debut on 8 August, starting in a 2–2 draw at Everton.

=== West Bromwich Albion ===
On 31 August 2016, Nyom joined fellow Premier League team West Bromwich Albion for an undisclosed fee. After establishing himself in the starting lineup he got his first assist in a 4–0 home win against Burnley, on 22 November.

Nyom returned to the Spanish top flight in the summer of 2018, signing with CD Leganés on a season-long loan deal. He made his debut for the club on 16 September, playing 85 minutes in a 0–1 home loss against Villarreal CF. He scored his only goal for them three months later, in a 1–1 draw to Getafe CF also at Estadio Municipal de Butarque.

=== Getafe ===
On 24 July 2019, after his loan spell with Lega ended, Nyom joined Getafe on a two-year contract with an option for another – West Bromwich continued to complain to FIFA asking for £2.7million compensation. On 28 January 2022, he terminated his contract with the club.

=== Leganés ===
Nyom returned to Leganés on 28 January 2022, signing a 18-month contract.

=== Getafe ===
On 8 October 2024, Nyom returned to Getafe, signing a contract until the end of the season.

== International career ==
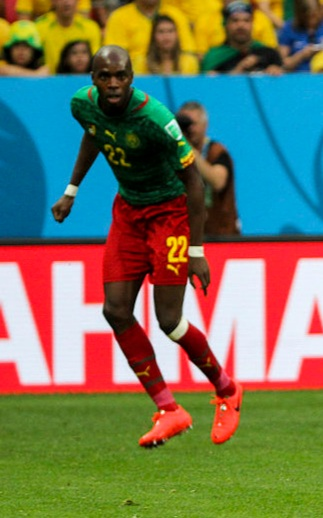
Nyom in 2014 FIFA World Cup against Brazil

Nyom opted to represent Cameroon internationally, and earned his first cap on 11 November 2011 in a 3–1 friendly win against Sudan. He was selected by manager Volker Finke for his 2014 FIFA World Cup squad, and made his debut in the tournament on 23 June against Brazil with the "Indomitable Lions" already eliminated from the knockout phase after two losses. He provided the cross for Joël Matip's equalizer shortly before the 30-minute mark, but the hosts eventually won 4–1.

== Career statistics ==
=== Club ===
As of match played 13 December 2024

Appearances and goals by club, season and competition
Club	Season	League			National cup (Note: Includes Copa del Rey, FA Cup)		League cup (Note: Includes EFL Cup)		Other		Total	
Club	Season	Division	Apps	Goals	Apps	Goals	Apps	Goals	Apps	Goals	Apps	Goals
Arles-Avignon	2008–09	Championnat National	37	0			0	0	0	0	37	0
Udinese	2009–10	Serie A	0	0	0	0	—		—		0	0
Granada (loan)	2009–10	Segunda División B	30	0	0	0	—		2 (Note: Appearances in Segunda División B promotion play-offs)	0	32	0
Granada (loan)	2010–11	Segunda División	39	1	2	0	—		4 (Note: Appearances in Segunda División promotion play-offs)	0	45	1
Granada (loan)	2011–12	La Liga	32	0	1	0	—		—		33	0
Granada (loan)	2012–13	La Liga	35	0	1	0	—		—		36	0
Granada (loan)	2013–14	La Liga	34	0	2	0	—		—		36	0
Granada (loan)	2014–15	La Liga	34	1	4	0	—		—		38	1
Granada (loan)	Total		204	2	10	0	—		6	0	220	2
Watford	2015–16	Premier League	32	0	4	0	0	0	—		36	0
Watford	2016–17	Premier League	0	0	0	0	1	0	—		1	0
Watford	Total		32	0	4	0	1	0	—		37	0
West Bromwich Albion	2016–17	Premier League	32	0	0	0	0	0	—		32	0
West Bromwich Albion	2017–18	Premier League	29	0	2	0	2	0	—		33	0
West Bromwich Albion	2018–19	Championship	2	0	0	0	0	0	—		2	0
West Bromwich Albion	Total		63	0	2	0	2	0	—		67	0
Leganés (loan)	2018–19	La Liga	23	1	2	0	—		—		25	1
Getafe	2019–20	La Liga	34	2	1	0	—		9 (Note: Appearances in UEFA Europa League)	0	44	2
Getafe	2020–21	La Liga	31	0	1	0	—		—		32	0
Getafe	2021–22	La Liga	5	0	2	0	—		—		7	0
Getafe	Total		70	2	4	0	—		9	0	83	2
Leganés	2021–22	Segunda División	16	1	0	0	—		—		16	1
Leganés	2022–23	Segunda División	36	1	1	0	—		—		37	1
Leganés	2023–24	Segunda División	31	0	2	1	—		—		33	1
Leganés	Total		83	2	3	1	—		—		86	3
Getafe	2024–25	La Liga	7	1	1	0	—		—		8	1
Career total			519	8	26	1	3	0	15	0	563	9

== Honours ==
Granada

- Segunda División B: 2009–10

Leganés

- Segunda División: 2023–24
