= Odion Ighalo =

Nigerian footballer (born 1989)

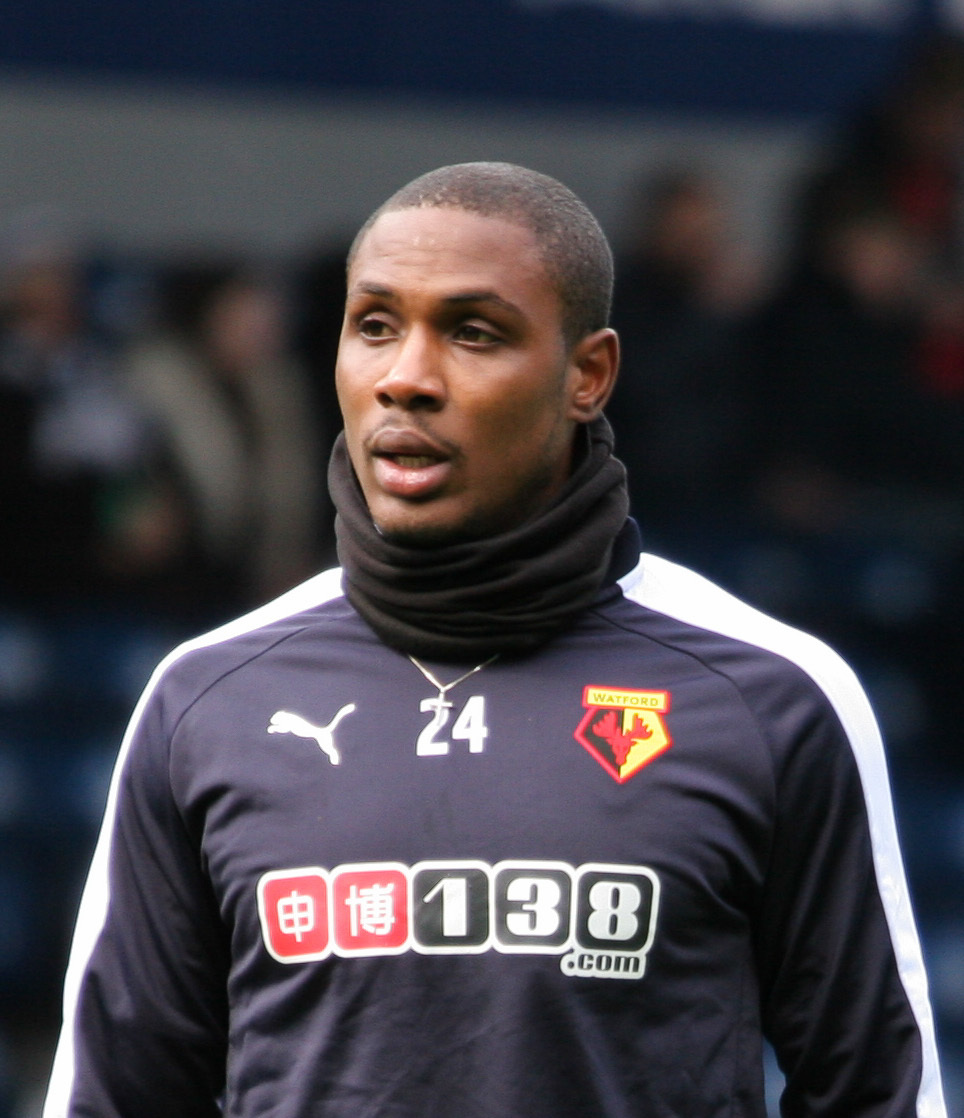
- Ighalo with Watford in 2016

Personal information
- Full name: Odion Jude Ighalo
- Date of birth: 16 June 1989 (age 37)
- Place of birth: Lagos, Nigeria
- Height: 1.85 m (6 ft 1 in)
- Position: Striker

Youth career
- 2000–2005: Prime

Senior career*
Years	Team	Apps	(Gls)
2005	Prime	5	(0)
2006	Julius Berger	10	(5)
2007–2008	Lyn	20	(9)
2008–2014	Udinese	6	(1)
2009–2010	→ Granada (loan)	26	(16)
2010–2011	→ Cesena (loan)	3	(0)
2011–2014	→ Granada (loan)	95	(16)
2014	→ Watford (loan)	8	(3)
2014–2017	Watford	82	(34)
2017–2018	Changchun Yatai	55	(36)
2019–2021	Shanghai Shenhua	17	(10)
2020–2021	→ Manchester United (loan)	12	(0)
2021–2022	Al-Shabab	31	(21)
2022–2023	Al-Hilal	40	(31)
2023–2025	Al-Wehda	63	(21)

International career^{‡}
2009	Nigeria U20	3	(0)
2015–2022	Nigeria	37	(16)
Medal record
Representing Nigeria
Men's football
Africa Cup of Nations
Third place	2019 Egypt
- * Club domestic league appearances and goals as of 26 May 2025 ‡ National team caps and goals as of 29 March 2022

Odion Jude Ighalo (born 16 June 1989) is a Nigerian professional footballer who plays as a forward.

After starting his career at Nigerian clubs Prime and Julius Berger, Ighalo moved to Norwegian club Lyn in 2007. A year later, he was signed by Italian club Udinese, spending most of his tenure on two separate loan spells with Spanish club Granada. In 2014, he signed for Championship club Watford and was integral in the club's promotion to the Premier League in the 2014–15 season. In January 2017, Ighalo joined Chinese Super League club Changchun Yatai for a reported £20 million, before moving onto Shanghai Shenhua. In January 2020, Ighalo returned to the Premier League, joining Manchester United on loan, initially until the end of the 2019–20 season; the loan was then extended until January 2021.

Ighalo made his debut for the Nigeria national team in March 2015 against Uganda. He represented the nation at the 2018 World Cup and was the highest goalscorer in the 2019 Africa Cup of Nations qualification campaign. He eventually led Nigeria to a third-place finish at the 2019 Africa Cup of Nations, where he finished in the competition's Team of the Tournament and was crowned top scorer.

== Club career ==
=== Early career ===
Born and raised in Ajegunle, Lagos, Ighalo played in his country with Prime and Julius Berger, where he was discovered by FIFA agent Marcelo Houseman who recommended him to Atta Aneke, being subsequently taken on trial by Norway's Lyn.

He made his Tippeligaen debut on 16 September 2007 at the age of just 18, scoring in a 2–0 home win against Viking. He scored six goals in 13 matches in his second year to help his team to the seventh position, and subsequently arose interest from other clubs in the country, with Brann reporting Lyn to the Norwegian Football Federation for unfairness in the negotiation process.

=== Udinese and Granada ===
On 30 July 2008, Ighalo signed for Udinese in Italy, moving alongside teammate Jo Inge Berget and agreeing to a five-year contract. He appeared rarely in Serie A in his debut season, scoring against Cagliari in a 6–2 home routing. Four of his five league appearances came as a late substitute.

Ighalo was loaned to Granada in the summer of 2009, as part of the partnership agreement between Udinese and the Spaniards. He scored 17 times in his first year (playoffs included) and five in the second, as both seasons ended in promotion; this was interspersed with a brief loan stint back in Italy, with Cesena.

Ighalo continued playing with Granada in the following years, still owned by the Udine club. He played his first La Liga match on 27 August 2011, starting and playing the full 90 minutes in a 0–1 home loss to Real Betis.

=== Watford ===
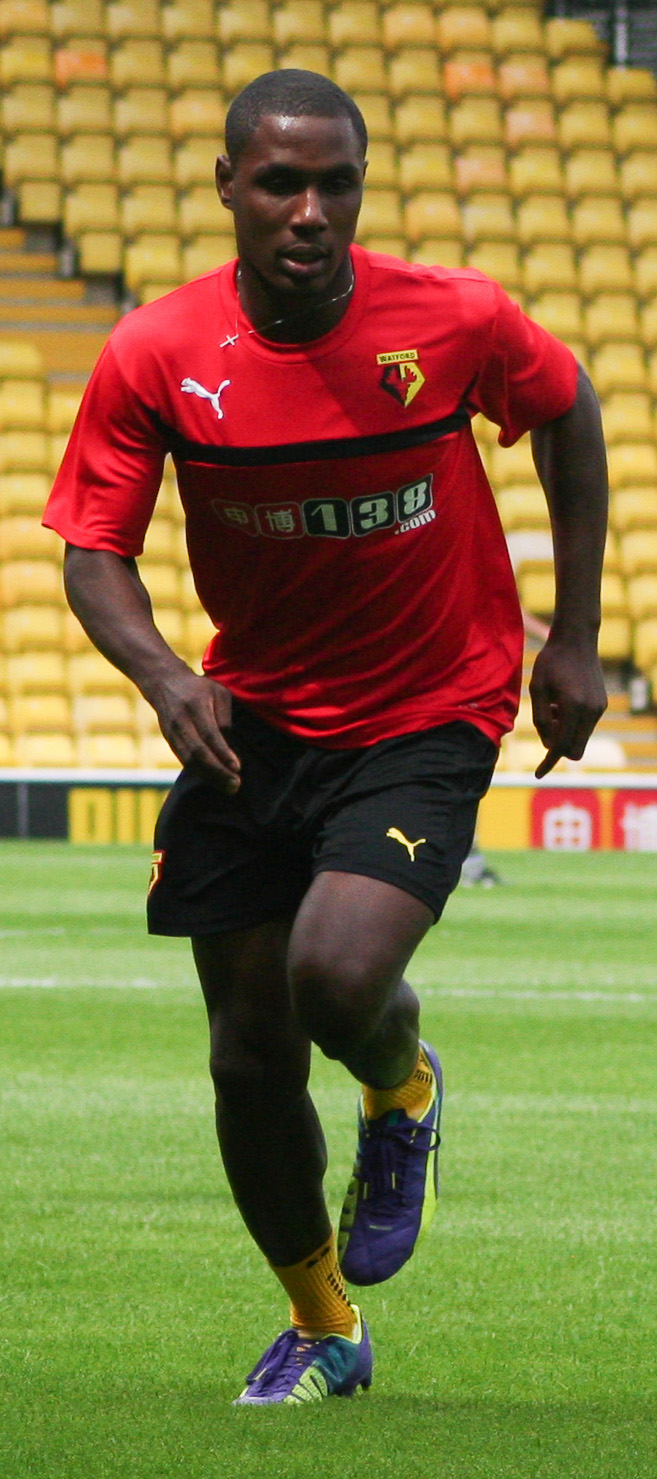
Ighalo warming up for Watford in 2014

Ighalo joined Watford on a season-long loan deal from Udinese, on 29 July 2014. He made his debut for the English club in the first round of the League Cup away to Stevenage on 12 August, and scored his first goal in the Championship against Brentford on 30 September by tucking the ball home after his initial penalty was saved by David Button, in a 2–1 home win.

On 24 October 2014, Watford terminated Ighalo's loan and re-signed him on a permanent deal the same day after Udinese released him from his contract. Exactly three months later, he scored four second-half goals and was voted man of the match in a 7–2 home routing of Blackpool, who led 0–2 at half time; he took his league tally to 14 on 10 February 2015, after netting a brace to help his team come from behind at Brentford to win it 2–1 – his second came through an injury-time header.

Ighalo scored in his Premier League debut on 8 August 2015, replacing José Manuel Jurado 16 minutes from time and putting the visitors ahead 2–1 in an eventual 2–2 draw away against Everton for the season opener. He netted twice in a 2–0 home win over West Ham United on 31 October, reaching seven goals for the season and becoming the highest club scorer in the competition after just 11 matches. On 20 December, Ighalo scored in a Watford victory for the fourth consecutive time, netting a brace in a 3–0 win over Liverpool. His five-goal haul earned him December's Premier League Player of the Month, while his manager Quique Sánchez Flores won the equivalent award.

Ighalo broke a 599-minute personal scoring drought on 13 March 2016, with a goal in a 2–1 win against holders Arsenal in the quarter-finals of the FA Cup, putting the Hornets into the last four for the first time in nine years. On 12 August he signed a new five-year contract but, the following season, he scored just one league goal and did not find the net in any of his last 15 games.

=== Changchun Yatai ===
On 31 January 2017, Ighalo joined Chinese Super League club Changchun Yatai for a reported £20 million. He ranked second in the scoring charts in his second season at 21, but his team suffered relegation.

=== Shanghai Shenhua ===
Ighalo transferred to Shanghai Shenhua on 14 February 2019. In March, he said he turned down a move to Barcelona the previous month.

In March 2020, he was offered a contract extension worth over £400,000 a week by Shenhua.

==== Loan to Manchester United ====
On 31 January 2020, Ighalo returned to the Premier League, joining Manchester United on loan until the end of the season. In doing so, he became the first Nigerian player, and the seventh African, to join the club. After the move was confirmed, Ighalo revealed that he had taken a pay cut to make the move happen, calling it a "dream" to join the club he has long supported. He opted to wear the number 25 shirt, previously worn by United's first and longest-serving African player, Quinton Fortune of South Africa.

His presence within the first team was initially blocked as a precautionary measure due to ongoing fears over the COVID-19 outbreak in China. After three substitute appearances, Ighalo made his full debut for United in their Europa League round-of-32 second-leg match against Club Brugge on 27 February. He scored his first United goal, which was also his maiden goal in a European competition, as the hosts won 5–0. A week later, he scored his first brace for the club as United beat Derby County 3–0 in the FA Cup. In United's final game before the suspension of football due to the COVID-19 pandemic, Ighalo scored a half-volley after juggling the ball in a 5–0 win over LASK; it was voted United's goal of the month for March.

With football suspended due to the COVID-19 pandemic and Ighalo's loan set to expire at the end of May, United announced that they had agreed to extend Ighalo's loan deal until 30 January 2021. On 26 January 2021, Ighalo posted a farewell message on social media, ahead of his imminent departure from United at the end of the month. United confirmed Ighalo's departure the following day.

=== Al Shabab ===
On 4 February 2021, Ighalo joined Saudi Professional League club Al Shabab on a two-and-a-half-year contract.

=== Al-Hilal ===
On 29 January 2022, he signed for Saudi club Al-Hilal. He finished his first season as the league's top scorer with 24 goals. On 26 February 2023, he scored four goals in a 7–0 win over Al-Duhail in the Champions League semi-final.

=== Al-Wehda ===
On 15 August 2023, Ighalo joined Al-Wehda on a free transfer.

== International career ==
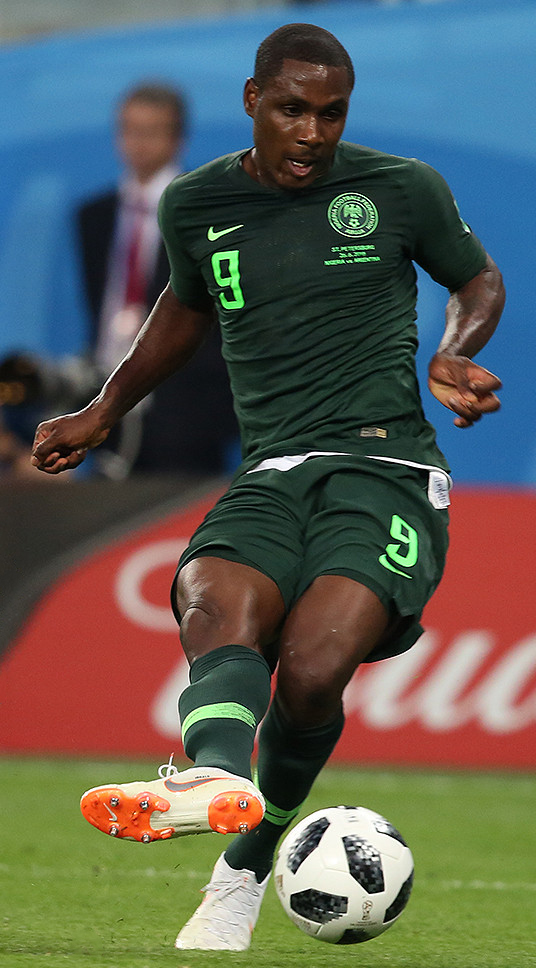
Ighalo playing for Nigeria at the 2018 World Cup

On 24 March 2015, after a series of strong performances for Watford, newly appointed Nigeria interim coach Daniel Amokachi selected Ighalo for the first time, and the latter stated, "I feel good because it is my dream to play for my country". He won his first cap two days later, starting in a 0–1 friendly home loss to Uganda.

Ighalo was initially named as one of three overage players in Nigeria's squad for the 2016 Olympic tournament, but he eventually did not make the trip to Brazil. In June 2018, he was named in the 23-man squad for the upcoming edition of the FIFA World Cup in Russia, making his first appearance in the competition by playing 73 minutes in the 0–2 group stage defeat against Croatia; in October, he revealed that his family had received death threats after he failed to score in the tournament.

Ighalo scored seven goals in the 2019 Africa Cup of Nations qualification campaign, the most by any player, to help Nigeria qualify for the finals in Egypt later that year. He was included in Gernot Rohr's squad, taking part in all the matches and finding the net against Burundi in the group phase (1–0), Cameroon in the round of 16 (3–2 win), Algeria in the semi-finals (1–2 loss) and Tunisia in the third-place playoff (1–0). At the end of the competition, he announced his retirement from the international scene.

Ighalo was recalled to the Nigeria team for the 2021 Africa Cup of Nations but his club, Al Shabab, blocked him from taking part.

== Personal life ==
Ighalo is a devout Christian, who also often dedicates part of his wages for Nigerian charitable organisations to help impoverished children, schools and widows below the poverty line. He is a lifelong Manchester United supporter. Ighalo has three children, two sons and one daughter. On 22 June 2021, He was unveiled as an Ambassador of the National Principal's Cup in Abuja by the Ministry of Youth and Sports Development, Sunday Dare.

In 2016, Ighalo was accused, by The Public Prosecutor's Office of Granada, Spain, along with 94 other people (including footballer Diego Buonanotte), of participating in a corruption scheme involving the standard written driving test. The scheme involved manipulating the tests to ensure that those involved passed the written exam.

== Career statistics ==
=== Club ===
As of match played 26 May 2025

Appearances and goals by club, season and competition
Club	Season	League			National cup (Note: Includes Coppa Italia, Copa del Rey, FA Cup, Chinese FA Cup, King Cup)		League cup (Note: Includes EFL Cup)		Continental		Other		Total	
Club	Season	Division	Apps	Goals	Apps	Goals	Apps	Goals	Apps	Goals	Apps	Goals	Apps	Goals
Prime	2005	Nigeria National League	5	0	0	0	—		—		—		5	0
Julius Berger	2006	Nigeria National League	10	5	0	0	—		—		—		10	5
Lyn	2007	Tippeligaen	7	3	0	0	—		—		—		7	3
Lyn	2008	Tippeligaen	13	6	0	0	—		—		—		13	6
Lyn	Total		20	9	0	0	—		—		—		20	9
Udinese	2008–09	Serie A	6	1	0	0	—		—		—		6	1
Granada (loan)	2009–10	Segunda División B	26	16	0	0	—		—		2 (Note: Appearances in Segunda División B play-offs)	1	28	17
Cesena (loan)	2010–11	Serie A	3	0	1	0	—		—		—		4	0
Granada (loan)	2010–11	Segunda División	21	4	0	0	—		—		4 (Note: Appearances in Segunda División play-offs)	1	25	5
Granada (loan)	2011–12	La Liga	30	6	1	0	—		—		—		31	6
Granada (loan)	2012–13	La Liga	28	5	2	1	—		—		—		30	6
Granada (loan)	2013–14	La Liga	16	2	2	2	—		—		—		18	4
Granada (loan)	Total		95	17	5	3	—		—		4	1	104	21
Watford	2014–15	Championship	35	20	1	0	2	0	—		—		38	20
Watford	2015–16	Premier League	37	15	5	2	0	0	—		—		42	17
Watford	2016–17	Premier League	18	1	1	0	1	1	—		—		20	2
Watford	Total		90	37	7	2	3	1	—		—		100	40
Changchun Yatai	2017	Chinese Super League	27	15	0	0	—		—		—		27	15
Changchun Yatai	2018	Chinese Super League	28	21	0	0	—		—		—		28	21
Changchun Yatai	Total		55	36	0	0	—		—		—		55	36
Shanghai Shenhua	2019	Chinese Super League	17	10	2	0	—		—		—		19	10
Manchester United (loan)	2019–20	Premier League	11	0	3	3	—		5 (Note: Appearances in UEFA Europa League)	2	—		19	5
Manchester United (loan)	2020–21	Premier League	1	0	0	0	2	0	1 (Note: Appearance in UEFA Champions League)	0	—		4	0
Manchester United (loan)	Total		12	0	3	3	2	0	6	2	—		23	5
Al Shabab	2020–21	Saudi Pro League	13	9	0	0	—		0	0	—		13	9
Al Shabab	2021–22	Saudi Pro League	18	12	1	1	—		0	0	—		19	13
Al Shabab	Total		31	21	1	1	—		0	0	0	0	32	22
Al-Hilal	2021–22	Saudi Pro League	13	12	3	2	—		4 (Note: Appearances in AFC Champions League)	2	2 (Note: Appearances in FIFA Club World Cup)	1	22	17
Al-Hilal	2022–23	Saudi Pro League	27	19	4	2	—		3	5	4	0	38	26
Al-Hilal	Total		40	31	7	4	—		8	7	5	1	58	42
Al-Wehda	2023–24	Saudi Pro League	31	15	2	1	—		—		1 (Note: Appearance in Saudi Super Cup)	0	34	16
Al-Wehda	2024–25	Saudi Pro League	32	6	2	1	—		—		—		34	7
Al-Wehda	Total		63	21	4	2	—		—		1	0	68	23
Career total			473	204	30	15	5	1	14	9	12	3	533	232

=== International ===
As of match played 29 March 2022

Appearances and goals by national team and year
National team	Year	Apps	Goals
Nigeria	2015	7	2
Nigeria	2016	5	1
Nigeria	2017	3	1
Nigeria	2018	10	6
Nigeria	2019	10	6
Nigeria	2021	1	0
Nigeria	2022	1	0
Total		37	16

Scores and results list Nigeria's goal tally first.

List of international goals scored by Odion Ighalo
No.	Date	Venue	Cap	Opponent	Score	Result	Competition
1	13 June 2015	Ahmadu Bello, Kaduna, Nigeria	3	Chad	2–0	2–0	2017 Africa Cup of Nations qualification
2	11 October 2015	Edmond Machtens, Brussels, Belgium	5	Cameroon	3–0	3–0	Friendly
3	31 May 2016	Josy Barthel, Luxembourg City, Luxembourg	11	Luxembourg	3–1	3–1	Friendly
4	1 September 2017	Godswill Akpabio, Uyo, Nigeria	13	Cameroon	1–0	4–0	2018 FIFA World Cup qualification
5	8 September 2018	Stade Linité, Victoria, Seychelles	23	Seychelles	3–0	3–0	2019 Africa Cup of Nations qualification
6	13 October 2018	Ahmadu Bello, Kaduna, Nigeria	24	Libya	1–0	4–0	2019 Africa Cup of Nations qualification
7	13 October 2018	Ahmadu Bello, Kaduna, Nigeria	24	Libya	2–0	4–0	2019 Africa Cup of Nations qualification
8	13 October 2018	Ahmadu Bello, Kaduna, Nigeria	24	Libya	3–0	4–0	2019 Africa Cup of Nations qualification
9	16 October 2018	Taïeb Mhiri, Sfax, Tunisia	25	Libya	1–0	3–2	2019 Africa Cup of Nations qualification
10	16 October 2018	Taïeb Mhiri, Sfax, Tunisia	25	Libya	3–2	3–2	2019 Africa Cup of Nations qualification
11	22 March 2019	Stephen Keshi, Asaba, Nigeria	26	Seychelles	1–0	3–1	2019 Africa Cup of Nations qualification
12	22 June 2019	Alexandria Stadium, Alexandria, Egypt	29	Burundi	1–0	1–0	2019 Africa Cup of Nations
13	6 July 2019	Alexandria Stadium, Alexandria, Egypt	32	Cameroon	1–0	3–2	2019 Africa Cup of Nations
14	6 July 2019	Alexandria Stadium, Alexandria, Egypt	32	Cameroon	2–2	3–2	2019 Africa Cup of Nations
15	14 July 2019	International Stadium, Cairo, Egypt	34	Algeria	1–1	1–2	2019 Africa Cup of Nations
16	17 July 2019	Al Salam Stadium, Cairo, Egypt	35	Tunisia	1–0	1–0	2019 Africa Cup of Nations

== Honours ==
Watford

- Football League Championship runner-up: 2014–15

Shanghai Shenhua

- Chinese FA Cup: 2019

Al-Hilal

- Saudi Pro League: 2021–22
- King Cup: 2022–23
- AFC Champions League runner-up: 2022
- FIFA Club World Cup runner-up: 2022

Nigeria

- Africa Cup of Nations third place: 2019

Individual

- Premier League Player of the Month: December 2015
- Africa Cup of Nations Team of the Tournament: 2019
- Africa Cup of Nations Golden Boot: 2019
- Saudi Pro League Player of the Month: April & May 2021, March 2022
- Saudi Pro League Team of the Year: 2021–22, 2022–23
- Saudi Pro League Top Scorer: 2021–22
