= Roberto Fernández (footballer, born 1979) =

Spanish footballer

Roberto
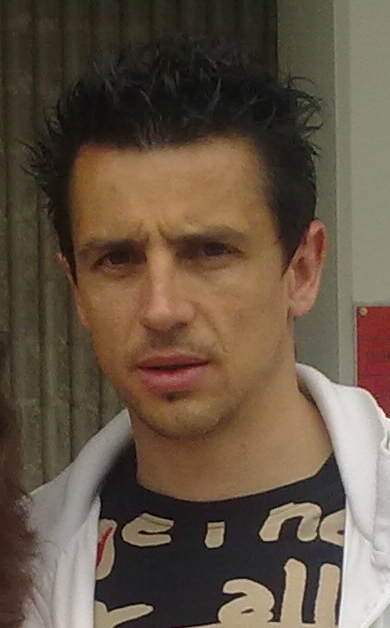
- Roberto in 2010

Personal information
- Full name: Roberto Fernández Alvarellos
- Date of birth: 25 January 1979 (age 47)
- Place of birth: Chantada, Spain
- Height: 1.81 m (5 ft 11 1/2 in)
- Position: Goalkeeper

Youth career
- Celta

Senior career*
Years	Team	Apps	(Gls)
1997–2002	Celta B	151	(0)
2002–2008	Sporting Gijón	197	(0)
2008–2010	Osasuna	28	(0)
2010–2015	Granada	131	(0)
2015–2018	Lugo	23	(0)
Total		530	(0)

Managerial career
- 2022–2023: Lugo (youth)
- 2023: Polvorín
- * Club domestic league appearances and goals

Roberto Fernández Alvarellos (born 25 January 1979), known simply as Roberto, is a Spanish former professional footballer who played as a goalkeeper.

== Club career ==
Roberto was born in Chantada, Province of Lugo. After several years struggling at RC Celta de Vigo, never making it past its B team, he moved to Sporting de Gijón in 2002. Save for his first season, when he was backup to Juanjo Valencia, he was a starter during his spell, winning the Ricardo Zamora Trophy in the 2005–06 campaign by conceding only 31 goals in 38 games whilst going unbeaten for 825 minutes with the Segunda División club.

In June 2008, after playing all the league matches but one to help Sporting return to the top division after a ten-year absence, Roberto also moved to La Liga, signing a three-year contract with CA Osasuna. After spending his first year on the bench, he eventually beat competition from veteran Ricardo (formerly of Manchester United) and became first choice, but lost it again in the 2009–10 season, appearing almost exclusively in the Copa del Rey – he took the field in the league's last two rounds, with the Navarrese already safe from relegation.

On 14 July 2010, Roberto was released by Osasuna and signed a three-year deal with Granada CF, returned to the second tier after 22 years. He only missed two games in the regular season in his first year, then starred in the play-offs in an eventual second consecutive promotion for the Andalusians.

Roberto started in three of the four following seasons, all spent in the top flight. He joined CD Lugo on 17 July 2015, after his contract expired.

On 1 June 2018, after spent the majority of his spell with the Galicians as second choice, Roberto announced his retirement at the age of 39.

== Career statistics ==
Appearances and goals by club, season and competition
Club	Season	League			National cup		Continental		Other		Total	
Club	Season	Division	Apps	Goals	Apps	Goals	Apps	Goals	Apps	Goals	Apps	Goals
Celta	2000–01	La Liga	0	0	0	0	0	0	—		0	0
Celta	2001–02	La Liga	0	0	0	0	0	0	—		0	0
Celta	Total		0	0	0	0	0	0	—		0	0
Sporting Gijón	2002–03	Segunda División	1	0	0	0	—		—		1	0
Sporting Gijón	2003–04	Segunda División	39	0	1	0	—		—		40	0
Sporting Gijón	2004–05	Segunda División	39	0	0	0	—		—		39	0
Sporting Gijón	2005–06	Segunda División	38	0	1	0	—		—		39	0
Sporting Gijón	2006–07	Segunda División	39	0	0	0	—		—		39	0
Sporting Gijón	2007–08	Segunda División	41	0	0	0	—		—		41	0
Sporting Gijón	Total		197	0	2	0	—		—		199	0
Osasuna	2008–09	La Liga	26	0	1	0	—		—		27	0
Osasuna	2009–10	La Liga	2	0	6	0	—		—		8	0
Osasuna	Total		28	0	7	0	—		—		35	0
Granada	2010–11	Segunda División	40	0	0	0	—		0	0	40	0
Granada	2011–12	La Liga	22	0	1	0	—		—		23	0
Granada	2012–13	La Liga	14	0	2	0	—		—		16	0
Granada	2013–14	La Liga	32	0	0	0	—		—		32	0
Granada	2014–15	La Liga	23	0	2	0	—		—		25	0
Granada	Total		131	0	5	0	—		0	0	136	0
Lugo	2015–16	Segunda División	5	0	1	0	—		—		6	0
Lugo	2016–17	Segunda División	14	0	1	0	—		—		15	0
Lugo	2017–18	Segunda División	4	0	2	0	—		—		6	0
Lugo	Total		23	0	4	0	—		—		27	0
Career total			379	0	18	0	0	0	0	0	397	0
