= Goku (footballer) =

Spanish footballer

Personal information
- Full name: Francisco Javier Martín Medina
- Date of birth: 1 April 1990 (age 36)
- Place of birth: Almuñécar, Spain
- Height: 1.71 m (5 ft 7 1/2 in)
- Position: Midfielder

Youth career
- Poli Ejido

Senior career*
Years	Team	Apps	(Gls)
2009–2010	Poli Ejido B	6	(0)
2010	Cádiz B	3	(0)
2010	Los Marinos	5	(1)
2010–2013	Granada B	57	(4)
2011	Granada	1	(0)
2011–2012	→ Burgos (loan)	13	(0)
2012	→ Alcalá (loan)	1	(0)
2013	Murcia B	10	(0)
2013–2015	Almuñécar	56	(6)
2015–2016	Comarca Mármol	30	(0)
2016–2017	Formentera	14	(1)
2017–2018	Motril	38	(1)
2018	Mancha Real	29	(2)
2018–2019	Juventud Sexitana	6	(1)
2019–2022	Motril	83	(3)
2023	Almuñécar City		
2023–2024	Málaga City	24	(1)
- * Club domestic league appearances and goals

Francisco Javier Martín Medina (born 1 April 1990), commonly known as Goku, is a Spanish former footballer who played as a central midfielder. Besides Spain, he has played in Poland.

== Club career ==
Born in Almuñécar, Granada, Andalusia, Goku finished his graduation in Polideportivo Ejido's youth setup, and made his senior debuts with the reserve team in the 2009–10 season. After a brief stint at Cádiz CF B, being released on 7 April 2010 due to indiscipline reasons, he moved to lowly UD Los Marinos.

In the 2010 summer Goku joined another reserve team, Granada CF B in the lower leagues. He made his first team debut on 4 June of the following year, coming on as a second-half substitute for Abel Gómez in a 0–0 away draw against Recreativo de Huelva in the Segunda División championship.

In August 2011 Goku renewed with the club and was immediately loaned to Segunda División B side Burgos CF. He subsequently joined RSD Alcalá on 1 February 2012 also in a temporary deal, after being deemed surplus to requirements by his previous club.

Goku returned to the Rojiblancos in July 2012, and subsequently extended his contract for a further season. He signed for Real Murcia Imperial in June 2013, but rescinded his link in November and immediately joined AD Almuñécar 77. He spent the rest of his career no higher than the Tercera División, and was part of SD Formentera's side that reached the last 32 of the Copa del Rey in 2016–17.
