= Henrique Almeida =

Brazilian footballer (born 1991)

Personal information
- Full name: Henrique Almeida Caixeta Nascentes
- Date of birth: 27 May 1991 (age 35)
- Place of birth: Brasília, Brazil
- Height: 1.77 m (5 ft 10 in)
- Position: Forward

Team information
- Current team: Gama

Youth career
- 2006–2007: Atlético Paranaense
- 2007–2009: São Paulo

Senior career*
Years	Team	Apps	(Gls)
2009–2012	São Paulo	30	(4)
2010	→ Vitória (loan)	17	(4)
2012	→ Granada (loan)	6	(0)
2012	→ Sport Recife (loan)	16	(4)
2013–2015	Botafogo	34	(4)
2014	→ Bahia (loan)	25	(2)
2015	→ Coritiba (loan)	20	(12)
2016–2019	Grêmio	27	(2)
2017	→ Coritiba (loan)	45	(12)
2018	→ Giresunspor (loan)	12	(4)
2018	→ Belenenses SAD (loan)	15	(5)
2019	→ Chapecoense (loan)	12	(3)
2020	Goiás	4	(0)
2021	Chapecoense	10	(0)
2022–2023	América Mineiro	45	(9)
2023–2024	Vila Nova	57	(9)
2025	Portuguesa	8	(0)
2025	Amazonas	30	(6)
2026–	Gama	23	(4)

International career
2011	Brazil U20	16	(9)
- * Club domestic league appearances and goals as of 19 November 2026

Henrique Almeida Caixeta Nascentes (born 27 May 1991), known as Henrique Almeida, is a Brazilian professional footballer who plays as a forward for Gama.

== Club career ==
Born in Brasília, Federal District, Henrique Almeida began his career as a goalkeeper in futsal, but later moved to a forward position when transitioning to the fields. He joined São Paulo's youth setup from Atlético Paranaense.

After impressing in the 2009 Copa São Paulo de Futebol Júnior, Henrique Almeida made his first team debut on 8 March of that year, coming on as a second-half substitute for Aislan in a 2–0 Campeonato Paulista away loss to Mogi Mirim. Rarely used, he only scored his first goal on 18 February 2010, netting his side's third in a 3–1 home win over Grêmio Barueri.

On 19 July 2010, Henrique Almeida was presented at Vitória on loan for the remainder of the year. He scored his first goals for the side on 15 August, netting a brace in a 4–2 home win over Santos, and despite scoring a further two goals, suffered team relegation.

Back to São Paulo, Henrique Almeida spent several months away on international duty, later declaring he would leave the club in August as he was "out of contract". However, he returned to the club shortly after, as his contract was running until 2013.

On 17 January 2012, it was announced São Paulo had agreed a fee to sell Henrique Almeida to English club QPR, subject to a work permit. Six days later, however, news broke of the collapse of the deal due to the work permit not being granted to the player, and he moved to La Liga side Granada on loan on 31 January.

On 25 May 2012, after featuring rarely at Granada, Henrique Almeida joined Sport Recife also in a temporary deal. The following 2 January, he signed a four-year contract with Botafogo, after the club bought 50% of his economic rights.

In April 2014, Henrique Almeida was loaned to Bahia until the end of the year. Back to Fogão for the 2015 season, he only featured in five matches before moving out to Coritiba also in a temporary deal.

Henrique Almeida scored a career-best 12 goals in only 20 matches for Coxa, before joining Grêmio on a four-year contract on 3 February 2016. After only three goals in the year, he returned to Coritiba on 17 January 2017, also on loan.

On 28 January 2018, after suffering relegation, Henrique Almeida moved to Turkish side Giresunspor on a six-month loan deal. Another loans to Portuguese club Belenenses SAD and Chapecoense followed, being also relegated with the latter.

Henrique Almeida signed for Goiás on 6 January 2020, playing in four matches before suffering an Achilles tendon injury. On 20 August 2021, he returned to Chape on a short-term deal, again suffering relegation.

On 19 January 2022, Henrique Almeida was announced at América Mineiro. He renewed his link for a further year on 19 October, but left in July 2023 to join Vila Nova.

On 3 January 2025, Henrique Almeida was announced at Portuguesa.

== International career ==
Henrique Almeida represented Brazil at under-20 level in the 2011 South American Youth Championship and the 2011 FIFA U-20 World Cup. At the latter tournament, he scored Brazil's 200th goal in the competition, being also awarded the Golden Ball and the Golden Shoe.

== Career statistics ==
As of 21 February 2025

Appearances and goals by club, season and competition
Club	Season	League			State league (Note: Includes in Campeonato Paulista, Campeonato Carioca, Campeonato Gaúcho, Campeonato Paranaense, Campeonato Goiano)		National cup (Note: Includes Copa do Brasil, Turkish Cup, Taça de Portugal)		Continental		Other		Total	
Club	Season	Division	Apps	Goals	Apps	Goals	Apps	Goals	Apps	Goals	Apps	Goals	Apps	Goals
São Paulo	2009	Série A	3	0	1	0	—		—		—		4	0
São Paulo	2010	Série A	0	0	7	1	—		0	0	—		7	1
São Paulo	2011	Série A	12	1	7	2	1	0	—		—		20	3
São Paulo	Total		15	1	15	3	1	0	0	0	—		31	4
Vitória (loan)	2010	Série A	17	4	—		—		—		—		17	4
Granada (loan)	2011–12	La Liga	6	0	—		—		—		—		6	0
Sport Recife (loan)	2012	Série A	16	4	—		—		—		—		16	4
Botafogo	2013	Série A	13	0	6	0	4	0	—		—		23	0
Botafogo	2014	Série A	0	0	13	4	0	0	5 (Note: Appearance(s) in Copa Libertadores)	1	—		18	5
Botafogo	2015	Série B	1	0	1	0	3	0	—		—		5	0
Botafogo	Total		14	0	20	4	7	0	5	1	—		46	5
Bahia (loan)	2014	Série A	25	2	—		3	1	3 (Note: Appearance(s) in Copa Sudamericana)	1	—		31	4
Coritiba (loan)	2014	Série A	20	12	—		—		—		—		20	12
Grêmio	2016	Série A	17	1	10	1	1	0	4	1	1 (Note: Appearance(s) in Primeira Liga (Brazil))	0	33	3
Coritiba (loan)	2017	Série A	32	7	13	5	2	0	—		—		47	12
Giresunspor (loan)	2017–18	TFF First League	12	4	—		2	0	—		—		14	4
Belenenses SAD (loan)	2018–19	Primeira Liga	15	5	—		1	0	—		3 (Note: Appearance(s) in Taça da Liga)	0	19	5
Chapecoense (loan)	2019	Série A	12	3	—		—		—		—		12	3
Goiás	2020	Série A	0	0	4	0	0	0	—		—		4	0
Chapecoense	2021	Série A	10	0	—		—		—		—		10	0
América Mineiro	2022	Série A	28	6	8	2	4	0	5	0	—		45	8
América Mineiro	2023	Série A	4	0	5	1	1	0	1	0	—		11	1
América Mineiro	Total		32	6	13	3	5	0	6	0	—		56	9
Villa Nova	2023	Série B	15	1	—		—		—		—		15	1
Villa Nova	2024	Série B	32	6	10	2	—		—		6 (Note: Appearance(s) in Copa Verde)	0	48	8
Villa Nova	Total		47	7	10	2	—		—		6	0	63	9
Portuguesa	2025	Série D	0	0	8	0	0	0	—		—		8	0
Career Total			290	56	93	18	22	1	18	3	10	0	433	78

== Honours ==
Botafogo

- Campeonato Carioca: 2013

Grêmio

- Copa do Brasil: 2016

Coritiba

- Campeonato Paranaense: 2017

Amazonas

- Campeonato Amazonense: 2025

Brazil U20

- South American Youth Championship: 2011
- FIFA U-20 World Cup: 2011

Individual

- FIFA U-20 World Cup Golden Ball: 2011
- FIFA U-20 World Cup Golden Shoe: 2011
