= Los Cármenes Trophy =

Trofeo Los Cármenes
- Founded: 1973
- Region: Europe
- Teams: 4 (1973–1975); 3 (1976–1989, 1992, 1994, 2011); 2 (1990–2010, 2012–)
- Related competitions: UEFA Cup
- Current champions: (United Arab Emirates) Al-Ain
- Most championships: (Spain) Granada (23 titles)

Los Cármenes Trophy, commonly known in Spanish as Trofeo Los Cármenes, and also historically known as Trofeo Granada, is an annual club football competition founded by Granada in the summer of 1973, at a rate to remain at the gates to contest the next season's UEFA Cup. During its more than 30 editions, it was played at the Estadio de Los Cármenes since 1995. With the demolition of the stadium, the event was then played on the Nuevo Los Cármenes.

== History ==
The first edition brought rivals Málaga, Peñarol and OFK Belgrade.

The edition XXXIII, disputed in 15 August 2009, was the first under the name Trofeo Los Cármenes, which faced Granada against newly promoted to First Division Xerez, with the result being 0–1, with the only goal scored by Antoñito.

Played on 18 August 2010, the XXXIV edition, was a single match that pitted Granada with Malaga, and in it the home side took the trophy after the 1-0 goal by former ex-malaguist Alex Geijo.

The XXXV edition in 2011 was a triangular tournament between Atlético Madrid, Beşiktaş and Granada.

Other names that the trophy has had are Trofeo Ciudad de la Alhambra, Trofeo Ciudad de Granada, Trofeo Granada Alhambra, Trofeo Hoteles MA, and Trofeo Diputación de Granada.

== Results ==
Edition	Name	Year	Champion	Final	Runner-up	3rd Place	4th Place
I	Trofeo Granada	1973	(Socialist Federal Republic of Yugoslavia) OFK Belgrade	4–0	(Uruguay) Peñarol	(Spain) Granada	(Spain) CD Málaga
II	Trofeo Granada	1974	(Spain) Granada	5–1	(Spain) CD Málaga	(Hungary) Vasas SC	(Portugal) Os Belenenses
III	Trofeo Granada	1975	(Portugal) Boavista	1–0	(Spain) Salamanca	(Spain) Granada	(Romania) Sportul Bucarest
IV	Trofeo Granada	1976	(Spain) Granada	No final	(Argentina) San Lorenzo	(Uruguay) Peñarol	–
V	Trofeo Ciudad de la Alhambra	1977	(Spain) Granada	No final	(Bulgaria) Levski Sofia	(Hungary) Újpest	–
VI	Trofeo Ciudad de la Alhambra	1978	(Spain) Granada	No final	(Spain) CD Málaga	(Netherlands) Sparta Rotterdam	–
VII	Trofeo Ciudad de la Alhambra	1979	(Spain) CD Málaga	No final	Morocco	(Spain) Granada	–
VIII	Trofeo Ciudad de la Alhambra	1980	(Spain) Granada	No final	(Spain) Hércules	(Spain) Almería	–
IX	Trofeo Ciudad de la Alhambra	1981	(Spain) Real Betis	No final	(Spain) Granada	(Spain) Almería	–
X	Trofeo Granada	1982	(Spain) Hércules	No final	(Spain) Granada	(Spain) Las Palmas	–
XI	Trofeo Granada	1983	(Spain) Granada	No final	(Romania) Politehnica Timișoara	(Spain) Salamanca	–
XII	Trofeo Granada	1984	(Spain) CD Málaga	No final	(Spain) Granada	(Portugal) Salgueiros	–
XIII	Trofeo Granada	1985	(Hungary) Haladás	No final	(Spain) Granada	Morocco U-20	–
XIV	Trofeo Granada	1986	(Spain) Granada	No final	(Spain) Real Murcia	(Spain) CD Málaga	–
XV	Trofeo Granada	1987	(Spain) Real Betis	No final	(Spain) Granada	(Argentina) Independiente	–
XVI	Trofeo Granada	1988	(Spain) Granada	No final	(Portugal) Académica de Coimbra	(Spain) Rayo Vallecano	–
XVII	Trofeo Granada	1989	(Uruguay) Danubio	No final	(Spain) CD Málaga	(Spain) Granada	–
XVIII	Trofeo Granada	1990	(Spain) Granada	4–2	(Soviet Union) Dynamo Moscow	–	–
XIX	Trofeo Granada	1991	(Spain) CD Málaga	2–1	(Spain) Granada	–	–
XX	Trofeo Granada	1992	(Spain) Atlético Marbella	No final	(Spain) Granada	(Morocco) ASFAR	–
XXI	Trofeo Granada	1993	(Spain) Granada	1–0	(Spain) Real Madrid Castilla	–	–
XXII	Trofeo Granada	1994	(Spain) Rayo Vallecano	No final	(Spain) Granada	(Spain) Valencia Mestalla	–
XXIII	Trofeo Granada	1995	(Spain) Granada	4–1	(Spain) Real Betis	–	–
XXIV	Trofeo Ciudad de Granada	1996	(Paraguay) Cerro Porteño	1–1 (p)	(Spain) Granada	–	–
XXV	Trofeo Granada	1997	(Spain) Real Jaén	2–0	(Spain) Granada	–	–
XXVI	Trofeo Granada	1998	(Spain) Granada	1–1 (p)	(Spain) Málaga CF	–	–
XXVII	Trofeo Granada	1999	(Spain) Rayo Vallecano	0–0 (p)	(Spain) Granada	–	–
XXVIII	Trofeo Granada	2002	(Spain) Granada	1–0	(Spain) Málaga CF	–	–
XXIX	Trofeo Granada Alhambra	2003	(Spain) Atlético Madrid	4–1	(Spain) Granada	–	–
XXX	Trofeo Granada Alhambra	2005	(Spain) Málaga CF	4–1	(Spain) Granada	–	–
XXXI	Trofeo Granada Alhambra	2006	(Spain) Granada	3–1	(Spain) Málaga CF	–	–
XXXII	Trofeo Granada Alhambra	2007	(Spain) Real Betis	1–0	(Spain) Granada	–	–
XXXIII	Trofeo Los Cármenes	2009	(Spain) Xerez	1–0	(Spain) Granada	–	–
XXXIV	Trofeo Los Cármenes	2010	(Spain) Granada	1–0	(Spain) Málaga CF	–	–
XXXV	Trofeo Hoteles MA	2011	(Spain) Granada	No final	(Turkey) Beşiktaş	(Spain) Atlético Madrid	–
XXXVI	Trofeo Diputación de Granada	2012	(Spain) Granada	2–1	(Portugal) Vitória de Guimarães	–	–
XXXVII	Trofeo Diputación de Granada	2013	(Portugal) Os Belenenses	0–0 (p)	(Spain) Granada	–	–
XXXVIII	Trofeo Diputación de Granada	2014	(Spain) Granada	4–1	(Spain) Atlético Tetuán	–	–
XXXIX	Trofeo Diputación de Granada	2015	(Spain) Granada	2–0	(Italy) Udinese	–	–
XL	Trofeo Diputación de Granada	2016	(Spain) Sevilla	2–0	(Spain) Granada	–	–
XLI	Trofeo Ciudad de Granada	2017	(Spain) Granada	1–0	(Spain) Málaga	–	–
XLII	Trofeo Ciudad de Granada	2018	(Spain) Málaga	0–0	(Spain) Granada	–	–
XLIII	Trofeo Ciudad de Granada	2019	(Spain) Granada	2–1	(Spain) Sevilla	–	–
XLIV	Trofeo Ciudad de Granada	2021	(Spain) Granada	3–1	(Spain) Málaga	–	–
XLV	Trofeo Ciudad de Granada	2022	(Spain) Málaga	1–1 (p)	(Spain) Granada	–	–
XLVI	Trofeo Ciudad de Granada	2024	(Spain) Granada	1–1 (p)	(Saudi Arabia) Al-Wehda	–	–
XLVII	Trofeo Ciudad de Granada	2025	(United Arab Emirates) Al-Ain	3–0	(Spain) Granada	–	–

== Performances ==
Team	Titles	Year/s
(Spain) Granada	23	1974, 1976, 1977, 1978, 1980, 1983, 1986, 1988, 1990, 1993, 1995, 1998, 2002, 2006, 2010, 2011, 2012, 2014, 2015, 2017, 2019, 2021, 2024
(Spain) CD Málaga / Málaga CF	6	1979, 1984, 1991, 2005, 2018, 2022
(Spain) Real Betis	3	1981, 1987, 2007
(Spain) Rayo Vallecano	2	1994, 1999
(Serbia) OFK Belgrade	1	1973
(Portugal) Boavista	1	1975
(Spain) Hércules	1	1982
(Hungary) Haladás	1	1985
(Uruguay) Danubio	1	1989
(Spain) Atlético Marbella	1	1992
(Paraguay) Cerro Porteño	1	1996
(Spain) Real Jaén	1	1997
(Spain) Atlético Madrid	1	2003
(Spain) Xerez	1	2009
(Portugal) Os Belenenses	1	2013
(Spain) Sevilla	1	2016
(United Arab Emirates) Al-Ain	1	2025

== See also ==
- Teresa Herrera Trophy
- Villa de Madrid trophy
- Ramón de Carranza Trophy
- Trofeo Costa del Sol
- Trofeo Colombino
