= Óscar Pérez (footballer, born 1981) =

Spanish footballer

Personal information
- Full name: Óscar Pérez Bovela
- Date of birth: 27 August 1981 (age 45)
- Place of birth: Oviedo, Spain
- Height: 1.78 m (5 ft 10 in)
- Position: Midfielder

Youth career
- 1993–1999: Oviedo

Senior career*
| Years | Team | Apps | (Gls) |
| 1999–2002 | Oviedo B | 56 | (7) |
| 2000–2003 | Oviedo | 14 | (2) |
| 2003–2004 | Eibar | 35 | (1) |
| 2004–2005 | Córdoba | 16 | (0) |
| 2006 | Bolton Wanderers | 0 | (0) |
| 2006–2009 | Tenerife | 86 | (7) |
| 2009 | Udinese | 0 | (0) |
| 2009–2013 | Granada | 39 | (1) |
| 2011–2012 | → Cádiz (loan) | 31 | (4) |
| 2012–2013 | → Racing Santander (loan) | 30 | (2) |
| 2014 | Ratchaburi | | |
| 2014–2017 | Caudal | 96 | (18) |
| 2017–2018 | Marino | 31 | (4) |
| Total | | 434 | (46) |
- * Club domestic league appearances and goals

Óscar Pérez Bovela (born 27 August 1981) is a Spanish former professional footballer who played as a midfielder.

== Club career ==
Pérez was born in Oviedo, Asturias. He started his professional career with hometown club Real Oviedo, but was not very successful there, playing only 14 games with the main squad over three seasons as they consecutively dropped two divisions.

Pérez then continued his career in the Segunda División where, in the 2004–05 campaign, another relegation befell, with Córdoba CF. In late January 2006, with the Andalusians in the Segunda División B, he moved to England with Bolton Wanderers, but did not manage any first-team appearances.

After being released in May 2006 with four other players, Pérez returned to Spain, signing with CD Tenerife. As the Canary Islands side returned to the top flight in 2009 after seven years, he appeared in 29 matches (although only three complete), scoring once.

In July 2009, Pérez was bought by Udinese Calcio in Italy with compatriot Iván Amaya, but both were immediately transferred to Granada CF as seven other players, after the two clubs' partnership agreement. In his first season, he contributed 16 games as the team returned to division two after an absence of more than 20 years.

In late July 2011, Pérez joined Cádiz CF of the third tier in a season-long loan.
