= 2012–13 Granada CF season =

Granada
2012–13 season
- President: Quique Pina
- Head coach: Lucas Alcaraz
- Stadium: Nuevo Los Cármenes
- La Liga: 15th
- Copa del Rey: Round of 32
- Top goalscorer: League: Youssef El-Arabi (8 goals); All: Youssef El-Arabi (8 goals)

The 2012–13 Granada CF season was the 79th season in club history and their 19th season in La Liga, the top division of Spanish football. It covered a period from 1 July 2012 to 30 June 2013.

== Matches ==
=== Legend ===
Win Draw Loss Postponed

=== La Liga ===
1	v

2	v

3	v

4	v

=== Copa del Rey ===
Round of 32	v
