= Manuel Lucena =

Spanish footballer

Manolo Lucena
Personal information
- Full name: Manuel Lucena Medina
- Date of birth: 18 November 1982 (age 43)
- Place of birth: Granada, Spain
- Height: 1.86 m (6 ft 1 in)
- Position: Centre-back

Youth career
- 2000–2001: Imperio Albolote

Senior career*
Years	Team	Apps	(Gls)
2001–2002	Arenas		
2002–2005	Granada	64	(4)
2004–2005	→ Marino (loan)	32	(6)
2005	Sporting Gijón	3	(0)
2006–2013	Granada	181	(15)
2013–2014	Mirandés	11	(0)
Total		291	(25)
- * Club domestic league appearances and goals

Manuel 'Manolo' Lucena Medina (born 18 November 1982) is a Spanish former professional footballer who played as a central defender.

His career was mainly associated with Granada, whom he represented in all four major levels of Spanish football.

== Club career ==
Lucena was born in Granada, Andalusia. In 2002 he signed for his hometown's Granada CF, at the time in the Tercera División. After two years as a starter, he was loaned to Marino de Luanco of Segunda División B, being first-choice in his only season as the Asturias club narrowly avoided relegation.

In the summer of 2005, Lucena joined Sporting de Gijón in the Segunda División. In January 2006, with only three league appearances to his credit – seven minutes in total – he returned to Granada, scoring five goals as the team promoted from the fourth division.

Lucena remained a key player in the next three third-tier campaigns, never appearing in less than 32 league games and occasionally pitching in at defensive midfielder. In 2009–10, already as captain, he contributed 26 matches and one goal en route to a return to division two after 22 years.

In late June 2011, after a second consecutive promotion for Granada, with him as the club's only player from the region of Granada, Lucena renewed his contract for a further two seasons. He made his La Liga debut on 27 August in a 0–1 home loss against Real Betis (90 minutes played), but totalled only nine official games over two seasons, being released subsequently.

Lucena retired at the end of the 2013–14 campaign at the age of 31, following a spell with CD Mirandés in the second tier. In February 2015, he returned to Granada as match delegate.
