= José Juan =

Spanish footballer (born 1979)

Personal information
- Full name: José Juan Figueiras García
- Date of birth: 25 January 1979 (age 47)
- Place of birth: Vigo, Spain
- Height: 1.82 m (6 ft 0 in)
- Position: Goalkeeper

Youth career
- Colegio Hogar San Roque

Senior career*
Years	Team	Apps	(Gls)
1998–1999	Valladolid B	1	(0)
1999–2002	Ourense	10	(0)
2002–2004	Celta B	68	(0)
2003	Celta	1	(0)
2004–2005	Ourense	20	(0)
2005–2007	Ciudad Murcia	53	(0)
2007–2008	Granada 74	6	(0)
2008–2009	Águilas	37	(0)
2009–2012	Granada	20	(0)
2012–2017	Lugo	132	(0)
2017–2019	Elche	51	(0)
2019–2022	Alcoyano	82	(0)
2022–2024	Athletic Torrellano	53	(0)
Total		534	(0)
- * Club domestic league appearances and goals

José Juan Figueiras García (born 25 January 1979), known as José Juan, is a Spanish former professional footballer who played as a goalkeeper.

== Club career ==
Born in Vigo, Province of Pontevedra, Galicia, José Juan played one match in La Liga with RC Celta de Vigo in the 2002–03 season, which consisted of 37 minutes in a 2–2 home draw against Racing de Santander after coming on as a substitute for Pablo Cavallero, who was sent off (he replaced field player José Ignacio de facto).

After having joined Ciudad de Murcia in January 2005, José Juan spent three and a half years with the Segunda División club – renamed Granada 74 CF in 2007 – and had a lengthy spell in the Segunda División B, with stints at CD Ourense (two), Celta de Vigo B and Granada CF. He won the Ricardo Zamora Trophy in the 2004–05 campaign whilst at Ourense.

In August 2012, after two consecutive promotions at Granada (losing his place after the first), José Juan signed for second division team CD Lugo of his native region. After five seasons of regular football, playing 135 games in all, he dropped down a tier to join Elche CF, who won promotion in the 2017–18 campaign with a play-off win over Villarreal CF B.

On 27 June 2019, free agent José Juan signed a one-year contract with Tercera División club CD Alcoyano, aged 40. He contributed 29 appearances in his first season, play-offs included, in a promotion.

José Juan put on a Player of the match performance in a Copa del Rey match against Real Madrid on 20 January 2021, a 2–1 victory in the round of 32. On 14 December that year, in the second round of the next tournament, he saved two penalties in the 3–1 shootout defeat of top-flight Levante UD.

In summer 2022, José Juan joined amateurs Athletic Club Torrellano.

== Career statistics ==
Appearances and goals by club, season and competition
Club	Season	League			National cup		Europe		Other		Total	
Club	Season	Division	Apps	Goals	Apps	Goals	Apps	Goals	Apps	Goals	Apps	Goals
Valladolid B	1998–99	Segunda División B	1	0	—		—		—		1	0
Ourense	1999–2000	Segunda División B	1	0	—		—		—		1	0
Ourense	2000–01	Segunda División B	0	0	—		—		2	0	2	0
Ourense	2001–02	Segunda División B	9	0	—		—		—		9	0
Ourense	Total		10	0	—		—		2	0	12	0
Celta B	2002–03	Segunda División B	36	0	—		—		—		36	0
Celta B	2003–04	Segunda División B	32	0	—		—		6	0	38	0
Celta B	Total		68	0	—		—		6	0	74	0
Celta	2002–03	La Liga	1	0	0	0	0	0	—		11	0
Celta	2003–04	La Liga	0	0	1	0	0	0	—		15	0
Celta	Total		1	0	1	0	0	0	—		224	0
Ourense	2004–05	Segunda División	20	0	3	0	—		—		23	0
Ciudad Murcia	2004–05	Segunda División	15	0	0	0	—		—		15	0
Ciudad Murcia	2005–06	Segunda División	17	0	0	0	—		—		17	0
Ciudad Murcia	2006–07	Segunda División	21	0	1	0	—		—		22	0
Ciudad Murcia	Total		53	0	1	0	—		—		54	0
Granada 74	2007–08	Segunda División	6	0	3	0	—		—		9	0
Águilas	2008–09	Segunda División B	37	0	1	0	—		—		38	0
Granada	2009–10	Segunda División B	17	0	0	0	—		4	0	21	0
Granada	2010–11	Segunda División	3	0	2	0	—		—		5	0
Granada	2011–12	La Liga	0	0	0	0	—		—		0	0
Granada	Total		20	0	2	0	—		4	0	26	0
Lugo	2012–13	Segunda División	11	0	1	0	—		—		12	0
Lugo	2013–14	Segunda División	27	0	1	0	—		—		28	0
Lugo	2014–15	Segunda División	29	0	0	0	—		—		29	0
Lugo	2015–16	Segunda División	37	0	1	0	—		—		38	0
Lugo	2016–17	Segunda División	28	0	0	0	—		—		28	0
Lugo	Total		132	0	3	0	—		—		135	0
Elche	2017–18	Segunda División B	15	0	1	0	—		—		16	0
Elche	2018–19	Segunda División	36	0	1	0	—		6	0	43	0
Elche	Total		51	0	2	0	—		6	0	59	0
Alcoyano	2019–20	Tercera División	27	0	1	0	—		2	0	30	0
Alcoyano	2020–21	Segunda División B	18	0	4	0	—		5	0	27	0
Alcoyano	2021–22	Primera División RFEF	37	0	3	0	—		—		40	0
Alcoyano	Total		82	0	8	0	—		7	0	97	0
Athletic Torrellano	2022–23	Tercera Federación	24	0	—		—		—		24	0
Athletic Torrellano	2023–24	Tercera Federación	29	0	—		—		—		29	0
Athletic Torrellano	Total		53	0	—		—		—		53	0
Career total			534	0	24	0	0	0	25	0	582	0
