= Dani Benítez =

Spanish footballer

Personal information
- Full name: Daniel González Benítez
- Date of birth: 7 April 1987 (age 39)
- Place of birth: Palma, Spain
- Height: 1.81 m (5 ft 11 in)
- Position: Midfielder

Youth career
- Juventud Sallista Inca
- 2001–2004: Mallorca

Senior career*
Years	Team	Apps	(Gls)
2004–2007	Mallorca B		
2007–2009	Mallorca	0	(0)
2007–2008	→ Pontevedra (loan)	31	(1)
2008–2009	→ Elche (loan)	29	(1)
2009–2014	Udinese	0	(0)
2009–2014	→ Granada (loan)	115	(18)
2016	Alcorcón	0	(0)
2016–2017	Racing Ferrol	24	(6)
2017–2019	AEL Limassol	29	(2)
2019–2021	Poblense	37	(3)
2021–2022	Sant Julià	10	(2)
2022–2024	Arenas	47	(12)
2024–2025	Huétor Tájar	26	(3)
Total		348+	(48+)
- * Club domestic league appearances and goals

Daniel "Dani" González Benítez (born 7 April 1987) is a Spanish former professional footballer who played as a left midfielder.

== Club career ==
Born in Palma de Mallorca, Benítez began his career in the youth ranks of RCD Mallorca, but never appeared for the first team officially. He spent the 2007–08 season on loan to Pontevedra CF of Segunda División B, and the following campaign with Segunda División side Elche CF, also on loan, before being released.

In the summer of 2009, Benítez signed for Udinese Calcio in Italy; he and seven other players were immediately transferred to Granada CF as part of the clubs' partnership agreement. In his second season he scored a career-best ten goals in 36 games as the Andalusians achieved a second consecutive promotion, returning to La Liga after 35 years. His volatile character led to his receiving of 13 yellow cards and two red.

Benítez failed to find the net during 2011–12, starting in 26 of his 30 league appearances. On 5 May 2012, after the 1–2 home loss against Real Madrid, he threw a bottle at the referee, Carlos Clos Gómez, which hit him in the face, for which he received a three-month suspension.

Upon his return to action, Benítez struggled heavily with injury problems. On 27 March 2014, it was announced he had failed a doping test in a match against Real Betis held the previous month, in which he was sent off after just 15 minutes on the pitch, cocaine being the illegal substance he had allegedly consumed.

On 9 January 2016, after nearly 20 months without a club, Benítez joined AD Alcorcón of the second division. He left on 28 June after making no official appearances, moving to third-tier Racing de Ferrol on a one-year contract one month later.

In July 2019, following a two-year spell in the Cypriot First Division with AEL Limassol, the 32-year-old Benítez returned to both his country and his native region by agreeing to a deal at amateurs UD Poblense.
