= Pedro Barrancos =

Spanish footballer

Personal information
- Full name: Pedro José Barrancos Miras
- Date of birth: 10 March 1988 (age 38)
- Place of birth: Murcia, Spain
- Height: 1.81 m (5 ft 11 1/2 in)
- Position: Forward

Team information
- Current team: Orihuela

Youth career
- Murcia

Senior career*
Years	Team	Apps	(Gls)
2006	Murcia	1	(0)
2005–2007	Murcia B	2	(0)
2007–2008	Sangonera	32	(7)
2008–2010	Murcia B	60	(4)
2010–2012	Granada	0	(0)
2011	→ Logroñés (loan)	2	(1)
2012	→ Cádiz (loan)	1	(0)
2012	→ Caravaca (loan)	14	(1)
2012–2013	UCAM Murcia	7	(0)
2013	Iraklis Psachna	14	(1)
2013–2014	UCAM Murcia	28	(8)
2014–2015	Arroyo	20	(1)
2015–	Orihuela	0	(0)
- * Club domestic league appearances and goals as of 26 January 2015

Pedro José Barrancos Miras (born 10 March 1988) is a Spanish professional footballer who plays for Orihuela CF as a forward.

== Club career ==
Born in Murcia, Barrancos was a Real Murcia youth graduate. On 17 June 2006, without even appearing for the reserves he made his professional debut, playing the last 16 minutes of a 0–1 away loss against Sporting de Gijón in the Segunda División.

In the 2008 summer Barrancos was loaned to Tercera División's Sangonera Atlético CF, appearing regularly and winning promotion at the end of the campaign. On 16 June 2010, he signed a four-year deal with Granada CF, newly promoted to the second level.

After appearing only in a Copa del Rey match against Real Betis for the Andalusians, Barrancos was loaned to Segunda División B club UD Logroñés on 28 December, until the end of the season. He subsequently served another temporary spell at Cádiz CF and Caravaca CF, and on 1 August 2012 he rescinded his link, joining UCAM Murcia CF a day later.

On 9 January 2013 Barrancos moved abroad for the first time in his career, joining Greek Football League side Iraklis Psachna F.C. In June, however, he returned to his native country and joined former club UCAM Murcia, now in the fourth level.

On 20 July 2014 Barrancos moved to Arroyo CP, in the third division. In January of the following year he rescinded his link and moved to fourth level's Orihuela CF.
