= Abel Gómez =

Spanish footballer (born 1982)

Abel
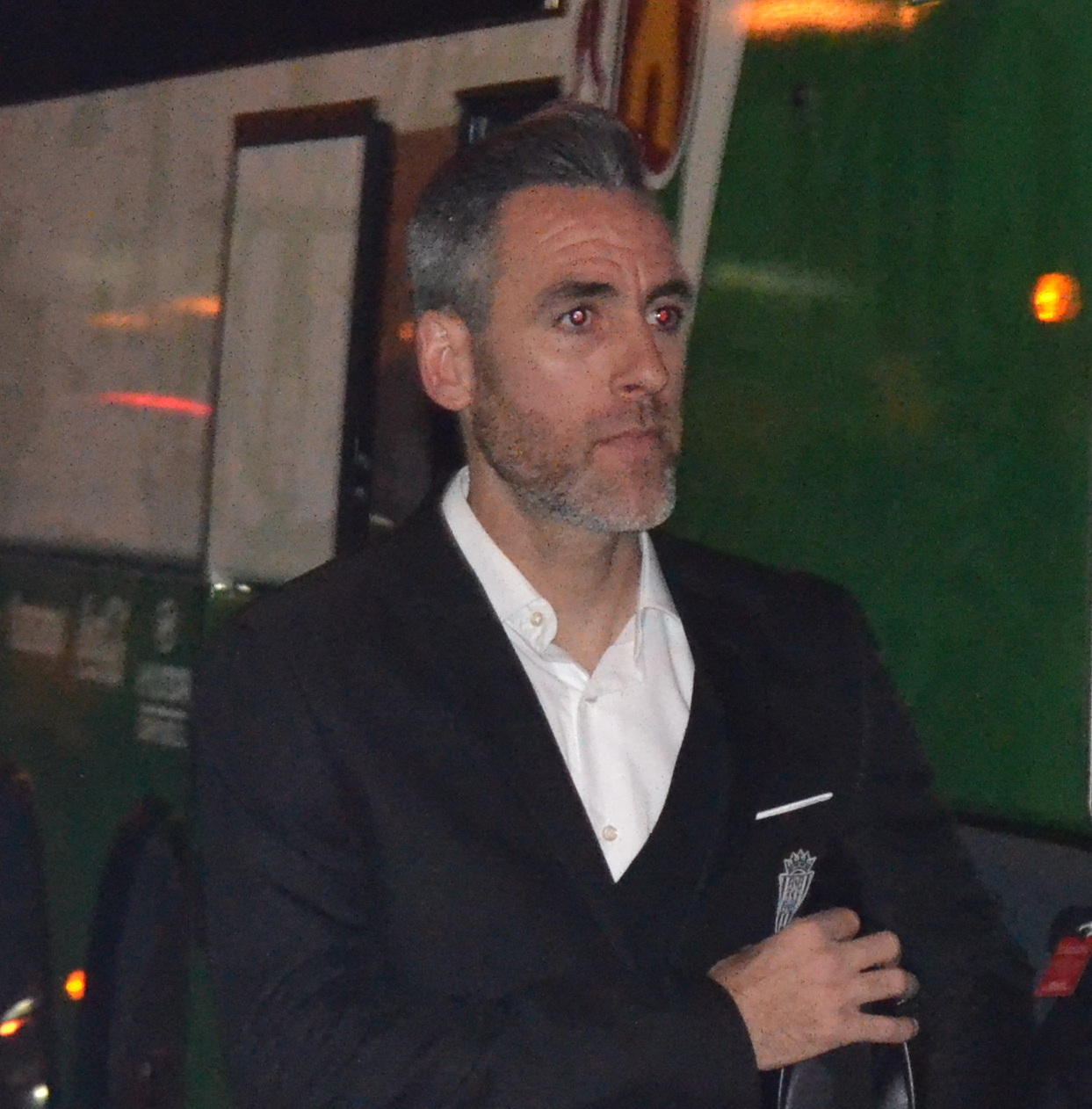
- Abel in 2015

Personal information
- Full name: Abel Gómez Moreno
- Date of birth: 20 February 1982 (age 44)
- Place of birth: Seville, Spain
- Height: 1.82 m (6 ft 0 in)
- Position: Midfielder

Youth career
- 1988–1998: Atlético Monachil
- 1998–1999: Granada 74
- 1999–2000: Sevilla

Senior career*
Years	Team	Apps	(Gls)
2000–2004	Sevilla B	97	(16)
2004–2006	Málaga B	68	(7)
2006–2008	Murcia	65	(9)
2008	Steaua București	2	(0)
2009–2010	Xerez	32	(0)
2010–2012	Granada	74	(4)
2012–2015	Córdoba	98	(7)
2015–2017	Cádiz	36	(2)
2017–2018	Lorca	24	(3)
2018	UCAM Murcia	11	(1)
2018–2019	Sanluqueño	21	(2)
Total		528	(51)

Managerial career
- 2019–2020: Sanluqueño
- 2021–2022: Rayo Majadahonda
- 2022–2024: Recreativo
- 2025: Antequera
- * Club domestic league appearances and goals

Abel Gómez Moreno (born 20 February 1982), known simply as Abel as a player, is a Spanish former professional footballer who played as a midfielder, currently a manager.

He totalled 351 matches and 30 goals across the two major levels of Spanish football, 102 and six being in La Liga where he represented Murcia, Xerez, Granada and Córdoba.

Gómez started working as a manager in 2019.

== Playing career ==
Abel was born in Seville. After beginning professionally with Sevilla FC's B team, he joined Andalusian neighbours Málaga CF in the same situation, helping to a two-year Segunda División stint.

The following season, Abel signed for Real Murcia CF, being instrumental in their return to La Liga after a three-year absence, although they would be immediately relegated. He joined FC Steaua București that summer, leaving after only four months. He returned to Spain and its second division with Xerez CD in late January 2009, still being able to appear in 15 games (12 starts) in the club's first-ever promotion to the top flight.

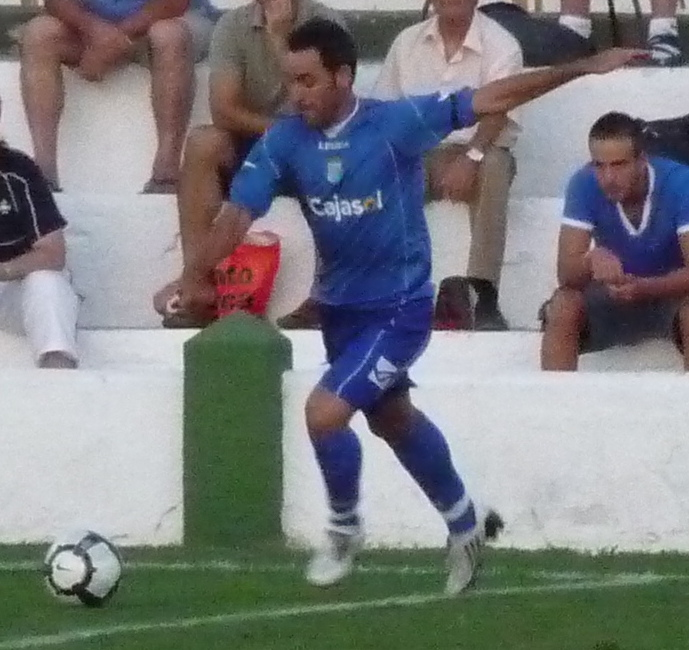
Abel in action for Xerez in 2009

Abel contributed roughly the same numbers – although in a full season – as Xerez were immediately relegated. In August 2010 he moved to another side in that region and tier, recently promoted Granada CF. In his debut campaign he only missed one league match in 42 (3,366 minutes of action), helping to a top-division return after an absence of 35 years.

For 2012–13, Abel returned to division two with neighbouring Córdoba CF. He scored five goals in his second season, which ended in promotion after more than four decades.

Abel earned another promotion in the 2015–16 campaign, with Segunda División B team Cádiz CF. In the last days of the 2017 January transfer window, the 35-year-old signed with Lorca FC.

On 31 January 2018, after helping the side to achieve a first-ever promotion to the second tier, Abel cut ties with Lorca and joined UCAM Murcia CF hours later. In July that year, he moved across the third division to Atlético Sanluqueño CF.

== Coaching career ==
Gómez retired in January 2019 to replace the fired Rafa Carrillo as his last club's manager. On 9 March 2020, he was dismissed after six consecutive losses.

In March 2021, Gómez was named coach of third division team CF Rayo Majadahonda. On 22 June 2022, he took over Segunda Federación's Recreativo de Huelva, leading them to a second consecutive promotion at the end of the season.

On 21 December 2024, Gómez was sacked by Recreativo, placed inside the relegation zone. The following 16 June, he was appointed at fellow Primera Federación side Antequera CF, being relieved of his duties on 24 November.

== Career statistics ==
Appearances and goals by club, season and competition
Club	Season	League			Cup		Other		Total	
Club	Season	Division	Apps	Goals	Apps	Goals	Apps	Goals	Apps	Goals
Sevilla B	1999–2000	Segunda División B	1	0	—		—		1	0
Sevilla B	2001–02	Segunda División B	23	0	—		—		23	0
Sevilla B	2002–03	Segunda División B	36	6	—		—		36	6
Sevilla B	2003–04	Segunda División B	37	10	—		6 (Note: Appearances in promotion play-offs)	0	43	10
Sevilla B	Total		97	16	—		6	0	103	16
Málaga B	2004–05	Segunda División	35	3	—		—		35	3
Málaga B	2005–06	Segunda División	33	4	—		—		33	4
Málaga B	Total		68	7	—		—		68	7
Murcia	2006–07	Segunda División	35	4	1	0	—		36	4
Murcia	2007–08	La Liga	30	5	1	0	—		31	5
Murcia	Total		65	9	2	0	—		67	9
Steaua București	2008–09	Liga I	2	0	0	0	—		2	0
Xerez	2008–09	Segunda División	15	0	0	0	—		15	0
Xerez	2009–10	La Liga	17	0	2	0	—		19	0
Xerez	Total		32	0	2	0	—		34	0
Granada	2010–11	Segunda División	41	3	2	0	4	0	47	3
Granada	2011–12	La Liga	33	1	1	0	—		34	1
Granada	Total		74	4	3	0	4	0	81	1
Córdoba	2012–13	Segunda División	37	2	4	0	—		41	2
Córdoba	2013–14	Segunda División	39	5	1	1	4	0	44	6
Córdoba	2014–15	La Liga	22	0	1	0	—		23	0
Córdoba	Total		98	7	6	1	4	0	108	8
Cádiz	2015–16	Segunda División B	32	2	3	0	4	0	39	2
Cádiz	2016–17	Segunda División	4	0	1	0	—		5	0
Cádiz	Total		36	2	4	0	4	0	44	2
Lorca	2016–17	Segunda División B	14	0	0	0	2	1	16	1
Lorca	2017–18	Segunda División	10	3	1	0	—		11	3
Lorca	Total		24	3	1	0	2	1	27	4
UCAM Murcia	2017–18	Segunda División B	11	1	0	0	—		11	1
Sanluqueño	2018–19	Segunda División B	21	2	0	0	—		21	2
Career total			528	51	18	1	20	1	566	53

== Managerial statistics ==
As of match played 22 November 2025

Managerial record by team and tenure
Team	Nat	From	To	Record								Ref
Team	Nat	From	To	G	W	D	L	GF	GA	GD	Win %	Ref
Sanluqueño	(Spain)	22 January 2019	9 March 2020	45	14	13	18	35	45	−10	31.11	
Rayo Majadahonda	(Spain)	9 March 2021	13 June 2022	50	26	6	18	65	62	+3	52.00	
Recreativo	(Spain)	22 June 2022	21 December 2024	96	39	33	24	104	88	+16	40.63	
Antequera	(Spain)	16 June 2025	24 November 2025	14	2	8	4	13	14	−1	14.29	
Career Total				205	81	60	64	217	209	+8	39.51	—
