= Nuevo Estadio de Los Cármenes =

Multi use stadium in Granada, Spain (opened 1995)

Los Cármenes
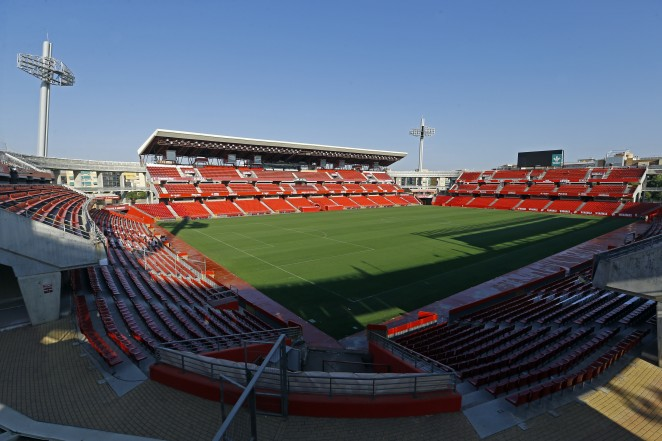
- UEFA
- Interactive map of Los Cármenes
- Full name: Nuevo Estadio de Los Cármenes
- Location: Calle Pintor Manuel Maldonado, s/n. 18008 - Granada, Spain
- Coordinates: 37°9′11″N 3°35′45″W
- Owner: Ayuntamiento de Granada
- Capacity: 21,600
- Surface: Grass
- Field size: 105 × 68 m

Construction
- Built: 1993–1995
- Opened: 16 May 1995
- Renovated: 2011

Tenants
- Granada CF (1995–present); CP Granada 74 (2002–2004); Granada Atlético CF (2005–2009); Spain national football team (selected matches)

Nuevo Estadio de Los Cármenes ([esˈtaðjo ˈnweβo los ˈkaɾmenes]) is a multi-use stadium in Granada, Spain. Currently, it is used mostly for football matches. The stadium has a capacity of 21,600 and was built in 1995 to be the home ground of Granada CF, the main football club of the city.

== History ==
The stadium opened on 16 May 1995. On 6 June 1995, Real Madrid and Bayer Leverkusen contested the first match at the new stadium. Real Madrid won the match with a final score of 1:0. Peter Dubovský scored the goal.

The first official match was an under-21 contest between Spain and Armenia. The final result was 4-0, with the goals scored by Óscar, Roberto, Morales and Raúl.

Granada CF played the first match on 22 August during the celebration of the XXIII Granada Trophy when they beat Real Betis by a score of 4–1. After the promotion of Granada CF to La Liga in 2019, the stadium was renovated: there were improvements of lighting and pitch quality, aesthetic change in the stand and a new fan shop opening.

== Location ==
This stadium is located in Zaidín, a suburb south of the city of Granada. It is very well-connected with the Circunvalación highway and with Camino de Ronda, one of the more important streets of the city. It was constructed by the side of Palacio Municipal de Deportes de Granada.

== Spain ==
The Spain national team has played nine times in Granada (in both stadiums, Los Cármenes and Nuevo Los Cármenes), four of them were official. They are still undefeated in the city, with eight victories, the last against North Macedonia winning 4-0 in a 2018 World Cup qualifying match.

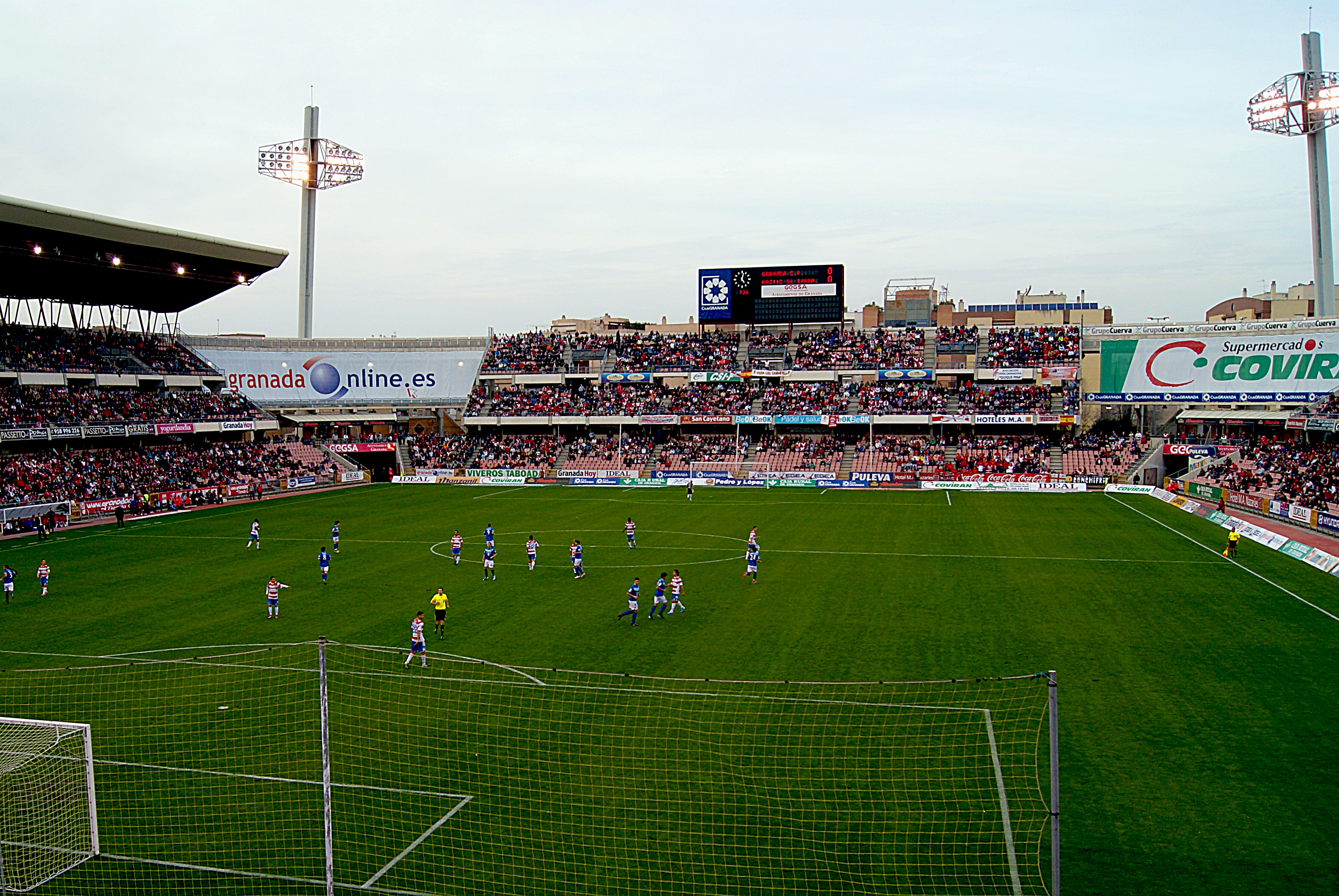
Estadio Nuevo Los Cármenes

=== Official matches ===
6 September 1995
UEFA Euro 1996 qualifying

Spain	6–0	Cyprus
Guerrero 45'; Alfonso 51'; Pizzi 75', 79'; Hierro 78'; Caminero 83'

Nuevo Los Cármenes, Granada
Attendance: 16,150
Referee: Dick Jol (Netherlands)

25 March 2011
22:00 UTC+1
UEFA Euro 2012 qualifying

Spain	2–1	Czech Republic
Villa 69', 73' (pen.)	Report	Plašil 29'

Nuevo Los Cármenes, Granada
Attendance: 16,400
Referee: Viktor Kassai (Hungary)

12 November 2016
20:45
2018 FIFA World Cup qualification Group G

Spain	4–0	North Macedonia
Velkovski 34' (o.g.); Vitolo 63'; Monreal 84'; Aduriz 85'	Report (FIFA); Report (UEFA)

Nuevo Los Cármenes, Granada
Attendance: 23,000
Referee: Robert Schörgenhofer (Austria)
