= Alexandre Geijo =

Footballer (born 1982)

Álex Geijo
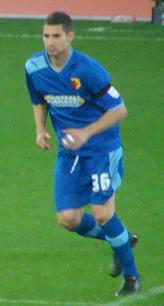
- Geijo with Watford in 2013

Personal information
- Full name: Alexandre Geijo Pazos
- Date of birth: 11 March 1982 (age 44)
- Place of birth: Geneva, Switzerland
- Height: 1.88 m (6 ft 2 in)
- Position: Striker

Youth career
- Galaica-Onex
- 1995–2000: Grand-Lancy

Senior career*
Years	Team	Apps	(Gls)
2000–2001	Neuchâtel Xamax	11	(1)
2001–2005	Málaga B	122	(51)
2003–2005	Málaga	15	(0)
2005–2007	Xerez	71	(20)
2007–2009	Levante	53	(15)
2009–2010	Racing Santander	19	(1)
2010–2015	Udinese	17	(1)
2010–2012	→ Granada (loan)	60	(26)
2012–2013	→ Watford (loan)	20	(2)
2013–2014	→ Mallorca (loan)	27	(1)
2015–2016	Brescia	36	(11)
2016–2019	Venezia	75	(18)
2019–2021	Sanluqueño	39	(6)
Total		565	(153)
- * Club domestic league appearances and goals

Alexandre "Álex" Geijo Pazos (born 11 March 1982) is a former professional footballer who played as a striker.

He amassed Segunda División totals of 216 matches and 70 goals over seven seasons, representing five clubs in the process. He added eight goals from 90 appearances in La Liga, with Málaga, Levante, Racing de Santander and Granada, and also played in his birth nation of Switzerland, Italy (all three major levels) and England.

== Club career ==
The son of Spaniards who immigrated to Switzerland, Geijo was born in Geneva. He started his professional career in his country of birth with Neuchâtel Xamax FCS in 2000, moving the following year to Spain where he began playing with Málaga CF, with little individual success (15 matches in three seasons, playing mostly for the reserves), being released in summer 2005.

For the next two years, Geijo played in the Segunda División with another Andalusian club, Xerez CD, where he blossomed into a useful attacking player, scoring 13 goals in his first season. For the 2007–08 campaign, he joined Levante UD: in a team severely hindered by financial problems, and eventually relegated from La Liga, he finished as the second team goal scorer at five, behind Mustapha Riga's eight.

Geijo started his second year strong, netting ten second-tier goals before the end of 2008. However, he missed the remainder of the season due to a serious fibula injury, after an awkward fall in a training session.

On 28 July 2009, Geijo joined Racing de Santander for four years; still recovering from injury, he nonetheless completed a successful medical. His only goal only arrived on 24 January 2010, but it was a crucial one, as the Cantabrians beat Sporting de Gijón away by a single goal. However, on 1 February, he signed with Udinese Calcio, rejoining former Levante coach Gianni De Biasi.

In July 2010, inserted in a partnership between Granada CF and Udinese, Geijo was loaned by the Italians in a season-long move. On 30 October he put three past former team Xerez in a 5–0 home win and, on 13 November, he scored all of his team's goals in a 4–1 home victory over FC Barcelona B. He finished the campaign with 24 goals (fourth-best in the competition) and his team achieved a second consecutive promotion, reaching the top flight after 35 years.

Geijo started 2011–12 injured, with Granada languishing in the table's bottom three for most of the first months. On 31 October 2011 he scored his first goal of the campaign, equalising an eventual 2–1 away defeat of Sevilla FC in a local derby.

On 9 August 2012, Geijo joined Football League Championship club Watford on a season-long loan. He scored his first goal on 27 November, playing the full 90 minutes in a 4–1 win at Sheffield Wednesday.

Geijo only scored once for Udinese in the Serie A, in the 2–2 away draw with U.C. Sampdoria on 21 December 2014. He remained in the country subsequently, with Brescia Calcio in the Serie B and Venezia F.C. in the Serie C, winning promotion with the latter in 2017.

Geijo retired in August 2021 at the age of 39, after two seasons in his country's Segunda División B with Atlético Sanluqueño CF.
