= 2014–15 RCD Espanyol season =

RCD Espanyol
2014–15 season
- President: Joan Collet
- Head coach: Sergio
- Stadium: Cornellà-El Prat
- La Liga: 10th
- Copa del Rey: Semi-final
- Top goalscorer: League: Sergio García (14); All: Sergio García; Cristhian Stuani (15)
Home colours	Away colours	Third colours

The 2014–15 RCD Espanyol season was the club's 113th season in its history and its 80th in the top-tier.

== Transfers ==
In:

No.	Pos.	Nation	Player
23	DF	ESP	Anaitz Arbilla (from Rayo Vallecano)
20	FW	ECU	Felipe Caicedo (from Al-Jazira)
22	DF	ESP	Álvaro (from Zaragoza)
24	MF	ESP	Paco Montañés (from Zaragoza)
6	MF	ESP	Salva Sevilla (from Betis)
—	MF	ESP	Lucas Vázquez (on loan from Real Madrid Castilla)

Out:

No.	Pos.	Nation	Player
—	DF	ESP	Joan Capdevila (to North East United)
—	FW	POR	Simão (unattached)

== Current squad ==
As of 1 September 2014

Note: Flags indicate national team as defined under FIFA eligibility rules; some limited exceptions apply. Players may hold more than one non-FIFA nationality.

No.	Pos.	Nation	Player
1	GK	ESP	Germán
2	DF	BRA	Felipe Mattioni
3	DF	ESP	Raúl Rodríguez
4	MF	ESP	Víctor Sánchez
5	DF	ESP	Víctor Álvarez
6	MF	ESP	Salva Sevilla
7	MF	ESP	Álex Fernández
8	FW	URU	Cristhian Stuani
9	FW	ESP	Sergio García (captain)
10	MF	ESP	Abraham
11	MF	ESP	Manuel Lanzarote
12	DF	ESP	Carlos Clerc
13	GK	ESP	Kiko Casilla (4th captain)

No.	Pos.	Nation	Player
14	MF	ESP	José Cañas
15	DF	MEX	Héctor Moreno
16	DF	ESP	Javi López (vice-captain)
17	MF	ESP	Lucas Vázquez (on loan from Real Madrid)
18	DF	ESP	Juan Rafael Fuentes
19	DF	ARG	Diego Colotto (3rd captain)
20	FW	ECU	Felipe Caicedo
22	DF	ESP	Álvaro
23	DF	ESP	Anaitz Arbilla
24	MF	ESP	Paco Montañés
25	GK	ESP	Pau López
28	MF	ESP	Joan Jordán
29	FW	ESP	Jairo Morillas

=== Out on loan ===
Note: Flags indicate national team as defined under FIFA eligibility rules; some limited exceptions apply. Players may hold more than one non-FIFA nationality.

No.	Pos.	Nation	Player
—	MF	ESP	Christian Alfonso (at Girona until 30 June 2015)
—	MF	ESP	Cristian Gómez (at Girona until 30 June 2015)
—	MF	ESP	Sergio Tejera (at Alavés until 30 June 2015)
—	FW	CGO	Thievy Bifouma (at Almería until 30 June 2015)

== Statistics ==
=== Appearances and goals ===
Updated as of 30 May 2015.

No.	Pos	Nat	Player	Total		La Liga		Copa del Rey	
No.	Pos	Nat	Player	Apps	Goals	Apps	Goals	Apps	Goals
2	DF	(Brazil) BRA	Felipe Mattioni	8	0	0+5	0	2+1	0
4	MF	(Spain) ESP	Víctor Sánchez	39	4	29+5	3	4+1	1
5	DF	(Spain) ESP	Víctor Álvarez	26	0	15+3	0	8	0
6	MF	(Spain) ESP	Salva Sevilla	30	0	17+9	0	0+4	0
8	FW	(Uruguay) URU	Cristhian Stuani	45	15	15+22	12	6+2	3
9	FW	(Spain) ESP	Sergio García	41	15	34+1	14	6	1
10	MF	(Spain) ESP	Abraham	27	1	16+6	1	4+1	0
13	GK	(Spain) ESP	Kiko Casilla	37	0	37	0	0	0
14	MF	(Spain) ESP	José Cañas	34	0	24+5	0	5	0
15	DF	(Mexico) MEX	Héctor Moreno	26	1	18+1	1	7	0
16	DF	(Spain) ESP	Javi López	33	0	25+3	0	5	0
17	MF	(Spain) ESP	Lucas Vázquez	39	4	30+3	3	5+1	1
18	DF	(Spain) ESP	Juan Rafael Fuentes	24	0	21+1	0	2	0
19	DF	(Argentina) ARG	Diego Colotto	26	1	22+1	1	2+1	0
20	FW	(Ecuador) ECU	Felipe Caicedo	40	12	25+10	9	2+3	3
22	DF	(Spain) ESP	Álvaro	42	1	34+2	1	5+1	0
23	DF	(Spain) ESP	Anaitz Arbilla	32	1	25+3	1	4	0
24	MF	(Spain) ESP	Paco Montañés	28	1	11+14	1	1+2	0
25	GK	(Spain) ESP	Pau López	10	0	1+1	0	8	0
27	DF	(Spain) ESP	Rubén Duarte	15	0	11	0	4	0
28	MF	(Spain) ESP	Joan Jordán	5	0	1+2	0	0+2	0
29	FW	(Spain) ESP	Jairo Morillas	4	1	0+3	0	0+1	1
30	DF	(Ivory Coast) CIV	Eric Bailly	5	0	4+1	0	0	0
32	MF	(Spain) ESP	Julián Luque	2	0	0+1	0	0+1	0
Players who have made an appearance or had a squad number this season but have been loaned out or transferred
1	GK	(Spain) ESP	Germán	0	0	0	0	0	0
3	DF	(Spain) ESP	Raúl Rodríguez	3	0	0+1	0	2	0
7	MF	(Spain) ESP	Álex Fernández	7	0	2+3	0	2	0
11	MF	(Spain) ESP	Manuel Lanzarote	2	0	0	0	2	0
12	DF	(Spain) ESP	Carlos Clerc	2	0	0	0	2	0
14	MF	(Spain) ESP	David López	1	0	1	0	0	0

== Competitions ==
=== Overall ===
Competition	Started round	Final position / round	First match	Last match
La Liga	—		August 2014	May 2015
Copa del Rey	Round of 32		December 2014	

Updated to match played June 2014
Source: Competitions

=== La Liga ===
==== League table ====
Pos	Team	Pld	W	D	L	GF	GA	GD	Pts
8	Celta Vigo	38	13	12	13	47	44	+3	51
9	Málaga	38	14	8	16	42	48	−6	50
10	Espanyol	38	13	10	15	47	51	−4	49 (Note: Espanyol ahead on head-to-head record; Rayo Vallecano–Espanyol 1–3, Espanyol–Rayo Vallecano 1–1.)
11	Rayo Vallecano	38	15	4	19	46	68	−22	49
12	Real Sociedad	38	11	13	14	44	51	−7	46

Source: La Liga
Rules for classification: 1) points; 2) head-to-head points; 3) head-to-head goal difference; 4) goal difference; 5) number of goals scored; 6) fair-play points; 7) playoff match

==== Matches ====
Kickoff times are in CET. Win Draw Loss

23 August 2014 1	Almería	1–1	Espanyol	Almería
23:00	Soriano 52'	Report	Arbilla (yellow card) 17' (yellow-red card) 32'; García (yellow card) 63', (goal) 90+4'; Sánchez (yellow card) 84'	Stadium: Juegos Mediterráneos; Referee: Alejandro Hernández Hernández

30 August 2014 2	Espanyol	1–2	Sevilla	Barcelona
23:00	Colotto (yellow card) 30'; Casilla (yellow card) 56'; Stuani 61'; Sánchez (yellow card) 64'; Vázquez (yellow card) 90'	Report	Bacca 34'; Iborra 54'	Stadium: Cornellà-El Prat; Referee: Alberto Undiano Mallenco

14 September 2014 3	Valencia	3–1	Espanyol	Valencia
17:00	Piatti 7'; Parejo 63'; Alcácer 73'; Barragán (yellow card) 82'	Report	Álvaro (yellow card) 75'; García 90+1' (pen.)	Stadium: Mestalla; Attendance: 38,500; Referee: Carlos Clos Gómez

20 September 2014 4	Espanyol	2–2	Málaga	Málaga
20:00	Caicedo 16'; López (yellow card) 39'; Stuani 88', (yellow card) 90+1'; Sevilla (yellow card) 90+3'	Report	Camacho 53', (yellow card) 70'; Sánchez (yellow card) 60'; Darder (yellow card) 75'; Duda (yellow card) 89'; Kameni (yellow card) 89'; Duda 90+3'	Stadium: La Rosaleda; Attendance: 12,600; Referee: Ignacio Iglesias Villanueva

25 September 2014 5	Espanyol	2–0	Getafe	Barcelona
19:00	Álvarez (yellow card) 62'; García 66'; Stuani 83'		Arroyo (yellow card) 75'; Míchel (yellow card) 82'	Stadium: Cornellà-El Prat; Referee: David Fernández Borbalán

28 September 2014 6	Córdoba	0-0	Espanyol	Córdoba
21:00	Crespo (yellow card) 25'; Ekeng (yellow card) 55'		Cañas (yellow card) 12'; Fuentes (yellow card) 36'; Álvaro (yellow card) 68'; Vázquez (yellow card) 81'; Mattioni (yellow card) 86'; Sánchez (yellow card) 89'	Stadium: Nuevo Arcángel; Attendance: 24,000

5 October 2014 7	Espanyol	2–0	Real Sociedad	Barcelona
19:00 CEST	Vázquez 7'; Cañas (yellow card) 28'; López (yellow card) 33'; Fuentes (yellow card) 47'; Sánchez (yellow card) 65'; Álvaro (yellow card) 69'; Colotto (yellow card) 86'; Stuani 90+2'	Summary	Gaztañaga (yellow card) 51'; González (yellow card) 56'	Stadium: Cornellà-El Prat; Attendance: 18,326; Referee: Mario Melero López

19 October 2014 8	Atlético Madrid	2–0	Espanyol	Madrid
12:00	Tiago 43'; Suárez 72'	Report		Stadium: Vicente Calderón; Attendance: 54,069; Referee: Iñaki Vicandi Garrido

26 October 2014 9	Espanyol	0–0	Deportivo La Coruña	Barcelona
17:00	Sánchez (yellow card) 52'; Álvaro (yellow card) 79'		Luisinho (yellow card) 37'; Medunjanin (yellow card) 53'; Postiga (yellow card) 69'; Insua (yellow card) 80'	Stadium: Cornellà-El Prat; Attendance: 21,000

2 November 2014 10	Elche	2–1	Espanyol	Elche
21:00	Pašalić (yellow card) 14'; Jonathan 19', 52', (yellow card) 84'; Cisma (yellow card) 31' (yellow-red card) 85'; Rodrigues (yellow card) 61' (yellow-red card) 75'		Cañas (yellow card) 26'; Álvaro (yellow card) 46'; Stuani 86' (pen.)	Stadium: Manuel Martínez Valero; Attendance: 21,472

9 November 2014 11	Espanyol	1–1	Villarreal	Barcelona
17:00	Álvarez (yellow card) 16'; García (yellow card) 83'; Stuani (yellow card) 83'; Colotto 90'		Mario 26'; Trigueros (yellow card) 36'; Cheryshev (yellow card) 43'; Costa (yellow card) 51'	Stadium: Cornellà-El Prat; Attendance: 22,000

21 November 2014 12	Athletic Bilbao	3–1	Espanyol	Bilbao
19:45	Aduriz 29', (yellow card) 61'; Viguera 44'; Iturraspe 78'		Vázquez (yellow card) 52'; Caicedo (yellow card) 61'; López (yellow card) 62'; Sevilla (yellow card) 75'; García (yellow card) 76'; Sánchez 84'	Stadium: San Mamés; Attendance: 28,000; Referee: Mario Melero López

29 November 2014 13	Espanyol	2–1	Levante	Barcelona
17:00	Caicedo 19'; García 34'; Cañas (yellow card) 85'; Arbilla (yellow card) 90'		Morales 12'; Ivanschitz (yellow card) 24'; Navarro (yellow card) 50'; Barral (yellow card) 81'	Stadium: Cornellà-El Prat; Attendance: 12,723; Referee: Carlos del Cerro Grande

7 December 2014 14	Barcelona	5–1	Espanyol	Barcelona
16:00	Lionel Messi 45', 50', 81'; Piqué 53'; Pedro 77'		García 13'; Sevilla (yellow card) 29'; Vázquez (yellow card) 52'; Álvaro (yellow card) 69'; Arbilla (yellow card) 79'	Stadium: Camp Nou; Attendance: 76,057; Referee: Ignacio Iglesias Villanueva

14 December 2014 15	Espanyol	2–1	Granada	Barcelona
11:00	Cañas (yellow card) 19'; Caicedo 34'; Sánchez (yellow card) 71'; Stuani 90'		Juan Carlos (yellow card) 41' (yellow-red card) 82'; Murillo (yellow card) 59'; El-Arabi 61'; Yuste (yellow card) 83'; Piti (yellow card) 88'; Mainz (yellow card) 89'	Stadium: Cornellà-El Prat; Attendance: 18,405; Referee: Santiago Jaime Latre

20 December 2014 16	Rayo Vallecano	1–3	Espanyol	Madrid
21:00	Baena (yellow card) 34'; Insúa (yellow card) 40'; Baptistão 45'; Quini (yellow card) 90'		García 9', 90+5'; Sevilla (yellow card) 17'; Bailly (yellow card) 29'; Álvaro (yellow card) 67]'; Stuani (yellow card) 72' (yellow-red card) 81'; Vázquez 76', (yellow card) 79'	Stadium: Campo de Vallecas; Attendance: 7,776; Referee: Juan Martínez Munuera

4 January 2015 17	Espanyol	1–2	Eibar	Barcelona
18:00	Caicedo 80'; Arbilla (yellow card) 83'		Manu 34'; Bóveda 38'; Ekiza (yellow card) 50'	Stadium: Cornellà-El Prat; Attendance: 19,136; Referee: Antonio Mateu Lahoz

10 January 2015 18	Real Madrid	3–0	Espanyol	Madrid
15:00	Rodríguez 12'; Bale 28'; Coentrão (red card) 51'; Ronaldo (yellow card) 52'; Nacho 77'		Fuentes (yellow card) 27'; Sánchez (yellow card) 58'; Arbilla (yellow card) 70'; Montañés (yellow card) 76'	Stadium: Santiago Bernabéu; Attendance: 74,896; Referee: David Fernández Borbalán

17 January 2015 19	Espanyol	1–0	Celta Vigo	Barcelona
21:00	Arbilla (yellow card) 54'; Cañas (yellow card) 58'; Álvaro (yellow card) 73'; Caicedo 90'		Fontàs (yellow card) 61'; Hernández (yellow card) 82'; Nolito (yellow card) 85'	Stadium: Cornellà-El Prat; Attendance: 12,710; Referee: Eduardo Prieto Iglesias

25 January 2015 20	Espanyol	3–0	Almería	Barcelona
18:00	Stuani 37', 40'; Abraham (yellow card) 51'; Cañas (yellow card) 58'; Caicedo 74'		Thomas (yellow card) 39'	Stadium: Cornellà-El Prat; Attendance: 16,792; Referee: Alberto Undiano Mallenco

1 February 2015 21	Sevilla	3–2	Espanyol	Seville
18:00	Vidal (yellow card) 12'; Beto (yellow card) 15'; Figueiras 27', (yellow card) 56'; Vitolo 35'; Iborra (yellow card) 38'; Arribas (yellow card) 45'; Banega (yellow card) 66'; Bacca (yellow card) 81'; Aspas 89', (yellow card) 89'		Cañas (yellow card) 13'; Stuani 15'; Sánchez (yellow card) 21', (goal) 77'; Casilla (red card) 40'; Vázquez (yellow card) 45+2'	Stadium: Ramón Sánchez Pizjuán; Attendance: 27,955; Referee: José González González

8 February 2015 22	Espanyol	1–2	Valencia	Barcelona
18:00	Álvarez (yellow card) 56'; Sánchez (yellow card) 61'; Moreno (yellow card) 82'; Montañés (yellow card) 84'; García 89', (yellow card) 90+2'		Pérez (yellow card) 34'; Piatti 62'; Gomes (yellow card) 82'; Pau 85' (o.g.); Orbán (yellow card) 90+1'; Negredo (yellow card) 90+2'	Stadium: Cornellà-El Prat; Attendance: 18,752; Referee: Mario Melero López

14 February 2015 23	Málaga	0–2	Espanyol	Málaga
21:00	Darder (yellow card) 47'; Amrabat (yellow card) 51'; Camacho (yellow card) 54'		Abraham (yellow card) 7'; Sánchez (yellow card) 23'; Álvaro 40'; Arbilla (yellow card) 61'; Stuani (yellow card) 76'; López (yellow card) 81'; Colotto (red card) 81'; Casilla (yellow card) 82'; García (yellow card) 90+1', (goal) 90+3'	Stadium: La Rosaleda; Attendance: 16,181; Referee: Jesús Gil Manzano

20 February 2015 24	Getafe	2–1	Espanyol	Getafe
19:45	J. Rodríguez (yellow card) 29'; Sarabia 33'; Lacen (yellow card) 47'; Vázquez 57'; Alexis (yellow card) 71'		López (yellow card) 30'; Duarte (yellow card) 60'; Cañas (yellow card) 62'; Arbilla 89'	Stadium: Coliseum Alfonso Pérez; Attendance: 9,614; Referee: Santiago Jaime Latre

27 February 2015 25	Espanyol	1–0	Córdoba	Barcelona
19:45	Moreno (yellow card) 11'; Fuentes (yellow card) 19'; Abraham 43'; Cañas (yellow card) 59'; Sánchez (yellow card) 83'; S. García (yellow card) 86'		Pantić (yellow card) 54'; Zuculini (yellow card) 65'; Andone (yellow card) 75'; B. García (yellow card) 86'	Stadium: Cornellà-El Prat; Attendance: 17,128; Referee: Carlos del Cerro Grande

8 March 2015 26	Real Sociedad	1–0	Espanyol	San Sebastián
16:00	Canales 38'; Bergara (yellow card) 84'; Pardo (yellow card) 90+2'		Sánchez (yellow card) 50'; Moreno (yellow card) 77'; Colotto (yellow card) 84'	Stadium: Anoeta; Attendance: 23,329; Referee: Eduardo Prieto Iglesias

14 March 2015 27	Espanyol	0–0	Atlético Madrid	Barcelona
15:00	Álvaro (yellow card) 8'; Sánchez (yellow card) 38'; López (yellow card) 60'		Gabi (yellow card) 42'; Miranda (red card) 45'; Tiago (yellow card) 57'; García (yellow card) 78'	Stadium: Cornellà-El Prat; Attendance: 22,538; Referee: Iñaki Vicandi Garrido

22 March 2015 28	Deportivo La Coruña	0–0	Espanyol	A Coruña
11:00	Lopo (yellow card) 34'; Sidnei (yellow card) 39'; Borges (yellow card) 50'; Bergantiños (yellow card) 70'		Sánchez (yellow card) 8'; López (yellow card) 30'; Duarte (yellow card) 43'; Álvaro (yellow card) 88'	Stadium: Riazor; Attendance: 19,957; Referee: Fernando Teixeira Vitienes

6 April 2015 29	Espanyol	1–1	Elche	Barcelona
19:00	García 17'; Sevilla (yellow card) 26'; Moreno (yellow card) 46'; Fuentes (yellow card) 65'		Adrián (yellow card) 33'; Mosquera (yellow card) 73'; José Ángel (yellow card) 75'; Herrera 77'	Stadium: Cornellà-El Prat; Attendance: 13,892; Referee: Pedro Pérez Montero

9 April 2015 30	Villarreal	0–3	Espanyol	Villarreal
21:00	Pina (yellow card) 34'		Caicedo 24', 68'; Álvaro (yellow card) 33'; Sánchez 79'	Stadium: El Madrigal; Attendance: 11,830; Referee: Carlos del Cerro Grande

12 April 2015 31	Espanyol	1–0	Athletic Bilbao	Barcelona
16:00	Stuani (yellow card) 33'; García 40'; Álvarez (yellow card) 88'		Laporte (yellow card) 38'; De Marcos (yellow card) 86'	Stadium: Cornellà-El Prat; Attendance: 19,054; Referee: David Fernández Borbalán

17 April 2015 32	Levante	2–2	Espanyol	Valencia
19:45	Simão Mate 21'; José Mari (yellow card) 64'; Víctor 87'		Vázquez 18'; Caicedo 45+1'; Sánchez (yellow card) 73'; López (yellow card) 75'; Duarte (yellow card) 89'	Stadium: Ciutat de València; Attendance: 17,062; Referee: Mario Melero López

25 April 2015 33	Espanyol	0–2	Barcelona	Barcelona
15:00	García (yellow card) 23'; Álvaro (yellow card) 59'; Arbilla (yellow card) 62'; Vázquez (yellow card) 73'; Cañas (yellow card) 80'; Moreno (yellow card) 90+1' (yellow-red card) 90+1'		Neymar 17'; Messi 25'; Alba (yellow card) 54' (yellow-red card) 55'; Alves (yellow card) 58'; Busquets (yellow card) 83'	Stadium: Cornellà-El Prat; Attendance: 30,253; Referee: Antonio Mateu Lahoz

30 April 2015 34	Granada	1–2	Espanyol	Granada
21:00	Candeias (yellow card) 62'; Mainz 73'; Martins (yellow card) 77'		Fuentes (yellow card) 32'; García (yellow card) 38', (goal) 45'; Casilla (yellow card) 79'	Stadium: Nuevo Los Cármenes; Attendance: 15,097; Referee: Carlos Velasco Carballo

3 May 2015 35	Espanyol	1–1	Rayo Vallecano	Barcelona
11:00	Arbilla (yellow card) 57'; Sánchez (yellow card) 64'; Moreno 80'; Duarte (yellow card) 87'; Cañas (yellow card) 90+4' (yellow-red card) 90+4'		Insúa 29'; Toño (yellow card) 64'	Stadium: Cornellà-El Prat; Attendance: 16,479; Referee: Fernando Teixeira Vitienes

8 May 2015 36	Eibar	0–2	Espanyol	Eibar
19:45	D. García (yellow card) 37'; Añibarro (yellow card) 56'		S. García 29', (yellow card) 56'; Casilla (yellow card) 49'; Stuani 60'; Arbilla (yellow card) 65'; Sánchez (yellow card) 86'	Stadium: Ipurua; Attendance: 5,648; Referee: José Antonio Teixeira Vitienes

17 May 2015 37	Espanyol	1–4	Real Madrid	Barcelona
18:00	Caicedo (yellow card) 18'; Sánchez (yellow card) 55'; Stuani 73'		Pepe (yellow card) 23'; Ronaldo 59', 83', 90+1'; Carvajal (yellow card) 68'; Marcelo (yellow card) 74', (goal) 79'	Stadium: Cornellà-El Prat; Attendance: 30,180; Referee: Juan Martínez Munuera

23 May 2015 38	Celta Vigo	3–2	Espanyol	Vigo
17:30	Sergio (red card) 20'; Fernández (yellow card) 28'; Mallo 38'; Mina (yellow card) 45+3'; Cabral 58'; Nolito 77'		García 23'; Stuani 48'; Álvaro (yellow card) 89'	Stadium: Balaídos; Attendance: 18,385; Referee: Carlos del Cerro Grande

=== Copa del Rey ===
==== Round of 32 ====
2 December 2014 First leg	Alavés	0–2	Espanyol	Vitoria-Gasteiz
19:00			Fernández (yellow card) 23'; Stuani 36', 90'	Stadium: Mendizorrotza; Attendance: 7,313; Referee: Alberto Undiano Mallenco

17 December 2014 Second leg	Espanyol	1–0	Alavés	Barcelona
19:00	Mattioni (yellow card) 32'; Morillas 64'		Manu (yellow card) 78'	Stadium: Cornellà-El Prat

==== Round of 16 ====
7 January 2015 First leg	Valencia	2–1	Espanyol	Valencia
21:00	Gayà 11'; Negredo 86' (pen.); Vezo (yellow card) 89'		Abraham (yellow card) 53'; Stuani 60'; Álvaro (yellow card) 85'; García (yellow card) 90'	Stadium: Mestalla; Attendance: 35,000; Referee: Alberto Undiano Mallenco

13 January 2015 Second leg	Espanyol	2–0	Valencia	Barcelona
19:00	Cañas (yellow card) 5'; Álvarez (yellow card) 45'; Caicedo 79', 89', (yellow card) 80'		Mustafi (red card) 14'; Vezo (yellow card) 37'; De Paul (yellow card) 51'; Barragán (yellow card) 79'	Stadium: Cornellà-El Prat; Attendance: 16,950; Referee: Ignacio Iglesias Villanueva

==== Quarter-finals ====
22 January 2015 First leg	Espanyol	3–1	Sevilla	Barcelona
21:00	Montañés (yellow card) 12'; Caicedo 18', (yellow card) 38'; Álvaro (yellow card) 56'; Arbilla (yellow card) 60'; García 74', (yellow card) 85'; Sánchez (yellow card) 75'; Vázquez 81'; Stuani (yellow card) 83'		Arribas (yellow card) 62'; Pareja (yellow card) 73'; Bacca 90+1'	Stadium: Cornellà-El Prat; Attendance: 9,500; Referee: Jesús Gil Manzano

29 January 2015 Second leg	Sevilla	1–0	Espanyol	Seville
21:00	Bacca (yellow card) 27'; Pareja (yellow card) 38'; Carriço (yellow card) 57'; Figueiras 88'		Arbilla (yellow card) 12'; Álvaro (yellow card) 54'; Álvarez (yellow card) 57'	Stadium: Ramón Sánchez Pizjuán; Attendance: 41,000; Referee: Juan Martínez Munuera

==== Semi-finals ====
11 February 2015 First leg	Athletic Bilbao	1–1	Espanyol	Bilbao
21:00	Aduriz 11'; Gurpegui (yellow card) 41'; Aurtenetxe (yellow card) 77'; Herrerín (yellow card) 85'		Sánchez 35'; Montañés (yellow card) 90+1'	Stadium: San Mamés; Attendance: 26,000; Referee: Carlos del Cerro Grande

24 March 2015 Second leg	Espanyol	0–2	Athletic Bilbao	Barcelona
21:00	Cañas (yellow card) 9'; Moreno (yellow card) 37'; Stuani (yellow card) 44'; Arbilla (yellow card) 66'; Álvaro (yellow card) 87'		De Marcos (yellow card) 8'; Aduriz (yellow card) 13'; Etxeita 41'	Stadium: Cornellà-El Prat

==== Results summary ====
Overall								Home						Away					
Pld	W	D	L	GF	GA	GD	Pts	W	D	L	GF	GA	GD	W	D	L	GF	GA	GD
2	0	1	1	2	3	−1	1	0	0	1	1	2	−1	0	1	0	1	1	0

Last updated: 12 September 2014.
Source: Competitive matches

==== Results by round ====
Round	1	2	3	4	5	6	7	8	9	10	11	12	13	14	15	16	17	18	19	20	21	22	23	24	25	26	27	28	29	30	31	32	33	34	35	36	37	38
Ground	A	H	A	H	H	A	H	A	H	A	H	A	H	A	H	A	H	A	H	H	A																	
Result	D	L	L	D	W	D	W	L	D	L	D	L	W	L	W	W	L	L	W	W																		
Position	8	16	19	18	11	12	8	11	10	13	12	14	12	13	11	10	10	10	9	9																		

Updated to match(es) played on 12 September 2014. Source:
A = Away; H = Home; W = Win; D = Draw; L = Loss
