= 2014–15 Granada CF season =

Granada
2014–15 season
- President: John Purdy
- Head coach: Joaquín Caparrós (until 16 January); Abel Resino (from 19 January); José Ramón Sandoval (from 1 May)
- Stadium: Nuevo Los Cármenes
- La Liga: 17th
- Copa del Rey: Round of 32
- Top goalscorer: League: Youssef El-Arabi (8); All: Youssef El-Arabi (8)
- Highest home attendance: 21,800 (vs Real Madrid, 01 November 2014)
- Lowest home attendance: 14,800 (vs Deportivo, 23 August 2014)
Home colours	Away colours	Third colours

The 2014–15 Granada CF season was the club's 83rd season in its history and its 21st in the top-tier.

== Squad ==
As 3 November 2014.

Squad no.	Name	Nationality	Position	Date of birth (age)	Note
Goalkeepers
1	Oier	(Spain)	GK	14 September 1989 (age 37)	
13	Roberto	(Spain)	GK	25 January 1979 (age 47)	
35	Stole Dimitrievski	(North Macedonia)	GK	25 December 1993 (age 32)	On loan from Udinese
Defenders
2	Allan Nyom	(Cameroon)	RB	10 May 1988 (age 38)	On loan from Udinese
3	Luís Martins	(Portugal)	LB	10 June 1992 (age 34)	
5	Diego Mainz (captain)	(Spain)	CB	29 December 1982 (age 43)	
6	Jean-Sylvain Babin	(Martinique)	CB	14 October 1986 (age 40)	
12	Dany Nounkeu	(Cameroon)	CB	11 April 1986 (age 40)	On loan from Galatasaray
22	Dimitri Foulquier	(France)	RB	23 March 1993 (age 33)	
24	Jeison Murillo	(Colombia)	CB	27 May 1992 (age 34)	
Midfielders
4	Fran Rico	(Spain)	CM/DM	3 August 1987 (age 39)	
7	Héctor Yuste	(Spain)	DM/CB	12 January 1988 (age 38)	
8	Javi Márquez	(Spain)	CM/AM/DM	11 May 1986 (age 40)	
10	Piti (vice-captain)	(Spain)	AM/LW/RW	26 May 1981 (age 45)	
14	Eddy	(Spain)	AM	2 August 1992 (age 34)	On loan from Murcia
16	Manuel Iturra	(Chile)	DM/CM	23 June 1984 (age 42)	
17	Abdoul Sissoko	(France)	DM/CM	20 March 1990 (age 36)	On loan from Udinese
19	Daniel Larsson	(Sweden)	RW/AM	25 January 1987 (age 39)	
20	Juankar	(Spain)	LW/LM	30 March 1990 (age 36)	On loan from Braga
26	Sulayman Marreh	(The Gambia)	DM/CB	15 January 1996 (age 30)	
Forwards
9	Youssef El-Arabi	(Morocco)	ST	3 February 1987 (age 39)	
11	Riki	(Spain)	ST	11 August 1980 (age 46)	
18	Jhon Córdoba	(Colombia)	ST	11 May 1993 (age 33)	
21	Alfredo Ortuño	(Spain)	ST	21 January 1991 (age 35)	
23	Rubén Rochina	(Spain)	ST	23 March 1991 (age 35)	
27	Darwin Machís	(Venezuela)	ST	7 February 1993 (age 33)	
29	Isaac Success	(Nigeria)	ST	7 January 1996 (age 30)	On loan from Udinese

== Transfers ==
=== Transfer In ===
No.	Pos.	Nat.	Name	Age	EU	Moving from	Type	Transfer window	Ends	Transfer fee	Source
6	DF	(Martinique)	Jean-Sylvain Babin	40	EU	Alcorcón (Spain)	Transfer	Summer	2018		
6	MF	(Spain)	Juan Carlos	36	EU	Braga (Portugal)	Loan	Summer	June 2015		
18	FW	(Colombia)	Jhon Córdoba	33	Non-EU	Querétaro (Mexico)	Transfer	Summer	2019		
19	FW	(Sweden)	Daniel Larsson	39	EU	Valladolid (Spain)	Transfer	Summer	2017		
8	MF	(Spain)	Javi Márquez	40	EU	Mallorca	Transfer	Summer	2017		
1	GK	(Spain)	Oier	37	EU	Barcelona	Transfer	Summer	2018		
21	FW	(Spain)	Alfredo Ortuño	35	EU	Girona	Loan return	Summer	2018		
23	FW	(Spain)	Rubén Rochina	35	EU	Blackburn Rovers (England)	Transfer	Summer	2018		
17	MF	(France)	Abdoul Sissoko	36	EU	Udinese (Italy)	Loan	Summer	June 2015		
7	DF	(Spain)	Héctor Yuste	38	EU	Hércules	Loan return	Summer			

=== Transfer out ===
No.	Pos.	Nat.	Name	Age	EU	Moving to	Type	Transfer window	Transfer fee	Source
	DF	(Colombia)	Brayan Angulo	37	Non-EU	Ludogorets Razgrad (Bulgaria)	Transfer	Summer	1.25M	
	FW	(Algeria)	Yacine Brahimi	36	Non-EU	Porto (Portugal)	Transfer	Summer	6.5M	
	MF	(France)	Alexandre Coeff	34	EU	Udinese (Italy)	Loan return	Summer	Free	
	FW	(Nigeria)	Odion Ighalo	37	Non-EU	Udinese (Italy)	Loan return	Summer	Free	
	GK	(Greece)	Orestis Karnezis	41	EU	Udinese (Italy)	Loan return	Summer	Free	

== Pre-season and friendlies ==
Win Draw Lose Postpone

18 July 2014 Pre-season	AD Almuñécar	0–8	Granada	Almuñécar, Andalusia, Spain
21:00 CEST			Sulayman 10'; Machís 26'; El-Arabi 28'; Piti 39'; Ortuño 50'; Clifford 51'; Buonanotte (65 p); Babin 75'	Stadium: Francisco Bonet de Almuñécar; Attendance: 2,500; Referee: Antonio Sánchez (Spain)

25 July 2014 Pre-season	La Hoya Lorca	0–2	Granada	Lorca, Region of Murcia, Spain
20:00 CEST			Ortuño 68', 83'	Stadium: Francisco Artés Carrasco; Attendance: 1,500; Referee: Lozano Reina (Spain)

26 July 2014 Pre-season	Granada	P–P	Blackpool	La Manga, Region of Murcia, Spain
17:00 CEST				Stadium: La Manga

30 July 2014 Pre-season	Albacete	2–2	Granada	Albacete, Castile-La Mancha, Spain
20:30 CEST	Chumbi 34'; Henares 71'		Success 28'; El-Arabi 31'	Stadium: Carlos Belmonte; Attendance: 5,000; Referee: Luis Collado (Spain)

4 August 2014 Pre-season	Recreativo Huelva	0–2	Granada	Lepe, Andalusia, Spain
20:00 CEST			El-Arabi 23'; Machís 42'	Stadium: Ciudad de Lepe; Attendance: 1,000; Referee: Rodríguez Varela (Spain)

8 August 2014 Pre-season	1. FC Köln	0–1	Granada	Cologne, North Rhine-Westphalia, Germany
17:00 CEST			El-Arabi 50' (pen.)	Stadium: RheinEnergieStadion; Attendance: 3,000; Referee: Sascha Stegemann (Germany)

10 August 2014 Pre-season	Mainz 05	0–1	Granada	Mainz, Rhineland-Palatinate, Spain
18:00 CEST			Ortuño 24'	Stadium: Bruchwegstadion; Attendance: 2,000; Referee: Robert Kempter (Germany)

14 August 2014 Pre-season	Granada	4–1	Moghreb Tétouan	Granada, Andalusia, Spain
21:00 CEST	Machís 3'; El-Arabi 27'; Babin 33', 36'		Fall 62'	Stadium: Nuevo Los Cármenes; Attendance: 13,000; Referee: Carlos del Cerro (Spain)

19 February 2015 Friendly	CSKA Moscow	0–0	Granada	Marbella, Andalusia, Spain
17:00 CET		Report		Stadium: Estadio Municipal de Marbella

== Competitions ==
=== Overall ===
Competition	Started round	Current position / round	Final position / round	First match	Last match
La Liga	—	17th	17th	23 August 2014	24 May 2015
Copa del Rey	Round of 32	Round of 16	Round of 16	3 December 2014	14 January 2015

Updated to match played 10 November 2014
Source: Competitions

=== La Liga ===
==== League table ====
Pos	Team	Pld	W	D	L	GF	GA	GD	Pts	Qualification or relegation
15	Getafe	38	10	7	21	33	64	−31	37 (Note: Levante ahead on head-to-head record; Levante–Getafe 1–1, Getafe–Levante 0–1.)	
16	Deportivo La Coruña	38	7	14	17	35	60	−25	35 (Note: Head-to-head record: Deportivo 7 pts, Granada 6 pts, Eibar 2 pts)	
17	Granada	38	7	14	17	29	64	−35	35	
18	Eibar	38	9	8	21	34	55	−21	35	
19	Almería (Note: Almería was docked 3 points due to an unpayment of a transfer.) (R)	38	8	8	22	35	64	−29	29	Relegation to Segunda División

Source: La Liga
Rules for classification: 1) points; 2) head-to-head points; 3) head-to-head goal difference; 4) goal difference; 5) number of goals scored; 6) fair-play points; 7) playoff match
(R) Relegated

==== Results summary ====
Overall								Home						Away					
Pld	W	D	L	GF	GA	GD	Pts	W	D	L	GF	GA	GD	W	D	L	GF	GA	GD
11	2	4	5	6	17	−11	10	1	1	3	2	7	−5	1	3	2	4	10	−6

Last updated: 10 November 2014.
Source: Matches

==== Results by round ====
Round	1	2	3	4	5	6	7	8	9	10	11	12	13	14	15	16	17	18	19	20	21	22	23	24	25	26	27	28	29	30	31	32	33	34	35	36	37	38
Ground	H	A	H	A	H	A	A	H	A	H	A	H																										
Result	W	L	D	W	L	L	L	L	D	L	D																											
Position	5	4	6	5	8	11	13	14	14	15	14																											

Updated to match(es) played on 10 November 2014. Source: Matches
A = Away; H = Home; W = Win; D = Draw; L = Loss

==== Matches ====
Kickoff times are in CET and CEST

23 August 2014 1	Granada	2–1	Deportivo La Coruña	Granada
21:00	Rochina 55'; El-Arabi (yellow card) 67'; Babin 77'	Report	20' Cavaleiro; (yellow card) 41' Luisinho; (yellow card) 57' Lopo; (yellow card) 76' J. Rodríguez	Stadium: Nuevo Los Cármenes; Attendance: 14,800; Referee: Iñaki Vicandi Garrido

31 August 2014 2	Elche	1–1	Granada	Elche
22:00	Suárez (yellow card) 48'; Rodrigues (yellow card) 57'; Albácar (yellow card) 86'; Mosquera (yellow card) 89'; Lombán 90+1'	Report	(yellow card) 34' Iturra; (yellow card) 54', (goal) 81' Rico; (yellow card) 55' Rochina; (yellow card) 87' Yuste	Stadium: Manuel Martínez Valero; Attendance: 20,025; Referee: Ignacio Iglesias Villanueva

14 September 2014 3	Granada	0–0	Villarreal	Granada
21:00	Machís (yellow card) 60'; Córdoba (yellow card) 87'; Nyom (yellow card) 90+3'	Report	(yellow card) 71' Vietto; (yellow card) 78' Trigueros	Stadium: Nuevo Los Cármenes; Attendance: 21,000; Referee: Carlos del Cerro Grande

20 September 2014 4	Athletic Bilbao	0–1	Granada	Bilbao
18:00	Iraola (yellow card) 38'; Aduriz (yellow card) 86'	Report	39' Córdoba; (yellow card) 48' Nyom; (yellow card) 55' Rochina; (yellow card) 62' Foulquier; (yellow card) 87' Yuste	Stadium: San Mamés; Attendance: 33,000; Referee: José Antonio Teixeira Vitienes

24 September 2014 5	Granada	0–1	Levante	Granada
21:00	Rico (yellow card) 62'; Success (yellow card) 83'	Report	(yellow card) 10' Diop; (yellow card) 29' Camarasa; 46', (yellow card) 80' García; (yellow card) 63' Navarro; (yellow card) 69' Rodas; (yellow card) 86' Jesús	Stadium: Nuevo Los Cármenes; Attendance: 15,731; Referee: Alfonso Álvarez Izquierdo

27 September 2014 6	Barcelona	6–0	Granada	Barcelona
18:00	Neymar 25', 44', 65'; Rakitić 42'; Messi 61', 81'; Alves (yellow card) 81'	Report	(yellow card) 34' Rico; (yellow card) 84' Foulquier; (yellow card) 89' Eddy	Stadium: Camp Nou; Attendance: 72,596; Referee: Juan Martínez Munuera

4 October 2014 7	Málaga	2–1	Granada	Málaga
22:00	Amrabat (yellow card) 15'; Santa Cruz 60'; Angeleri (red card) 72'; Antunes 80' (pen.)	Report	1', (yellow card) 90+1' El-Arabi; (yellow card) 19' Piti; (yellow card) 21' Iturra; (yellow card) 25' Foulquier	Stadium: La Rosaleda; Attendance: 19,000; Referee: Carlos Velasco Carballo

17 October 2014 8	Granada	0–1	Rayo Vallecano	Granada
21:00	Marreh (yellow card) 45+1'; Nyom (yellow card) 69'; Piti (yellow card) 72'; Rico (yellow card) 80'	Report	(yellow card) 38' Pereira; (yellow card) 38' Amaya; (yellow card) 53' Ba; (yellow card) 86' Insúa; (yellow card) 89' Baena; 90+3' Manucho	Stadium: Nuevo Los Cármenes; Attendance: 19,000; Referee: Santiago Jaime Latre

25 October 2014 9	Eibar	1 – 1	Granada	Eibar
22:00	Navas (yellow card) 14'; Bóveda (yellow card) 19', (goal) 37'; Abraham (yellow card) 57'	Report	8' Nyom; (yellow card) 23' Foulquier; (yellow card) 25' Córdoba; (yellow card) 49' Murillo; (yellow card) 79' Rico	Stadium: Ipurua; Attendance: 4,838; Referee: Antonio Mateu Lahoz

1 November 2014 10	Granada	0–4	Real Madrid	Granada
17:00	Eddy (yellow card) 39'	Report	2' Ronaldo; 31', 87' Rodríguez; 54' Benzema	Stadium: Nuevo Los Cármenes; Attendance: 21,800; Referee: José González González

8 November 2014 11	Celta Vigo	0–0	Granada	Vigo
22:00	Orellana (yellow card) 16'	Report	(yellow card) 35' Roberto; (yellow card) 36' Iturra; (yellow card) 58' Juan Carlos; (yellow card) 60' Rico; (yellow card) 72' Nyom	Stadium: Balaídos; Attendance: 20,000; Referee: Xavier Estrada Fernández

24 November 2014 12	Granada	0–0	Almería	Granada
20:45 CET	Iturra (yellow card) 18'; Babin (yellow card) 29'; Rochina (yellow card) 73' juan Carlos (yellow card) 87'	Summary	Azeez (yellow card) 38' (yellow-red card) 53'	Stadium: Nuevo Los Cármenes; Attendance: 16,500; Referee: Ignacio Iglesias Villanueva

30 November 2014 13	Sevilla	5 – 1	Granada	Seville
17:00 CET	Bacca 24', 79'; Banega 65'; Krychowiak (yellow card) 77'; Mbia 89'; Gameiro 90+2'	Report	Roberto (yellow card) 24'; Piti (yellow card) 24'; El-Arabi 42' (pen.)	Stadium: Ramón Sánchez Pizjuán; Attendance: 30,347; Referee: Eduardo Prieto Iglesias

7 December 2014 14	Granada	1–1	Valencia	Granada
21:00 CET	Foulquier (yellow card) 30'; Córdoba (yellow card) 40'; Fran Rico (yellow card) 69'; Juan Carlos (yellow card) 87'; Success 89'	Report	Gayà (yellow card) 8'; Parejo (yellow card) 30'; Gomes (yellow card) 37'; Alves (yellow card) 76'; Negredo 83'; Alcácer (red card) 86'	Stadium: Nuevo Los Cármenes; Attendance: 18,300; Referee: Alejandro Hernández Hernández

14 December 2014 15	Espanyol	2–1	Granada	Barcelona
12:00	Cañas (yellow card) 19'; Caicedo 34'; Sánchez (yellow card) 71'; Stuani 90'	Report	Juan Carlos (yellow card) 41' (yellow-red card) 82'; Murillo (yellow card) 59'; El-Arabi 61'; Héctor (yellow card) 83'; Piti (yellow card) 88'; Mainz (yellow card) 89'	Stadium: Cornellà-El Prat; Attendance: 18,405; Referee: Santiago Jaime Latre

21 December 2014 16	Granada	1–1	Getafe	Granada
17:00 CET	Rico (yellow card) 20'; Córdoba 40'; Iturra (yellow card) 61'; Riki (yellow card) 77'; Márquez (yellow card) 90+2'	Report	Alexis (yellow card) 37'; Velázquez (yellow card) 46', (goal) 78'; Lacen (yellow card) 51'	Stadium: Nuevo Los Cármenes; Attendance: 19,600; Referee: Fernando Teixeira Vitienes

5 January 2015 17	Córdoba	2–0	Granada	Córdoba
20:45 CET	Ghilas 16'; Cartabia (yellow card) 20'; Andone 44'; Campabadal (yellow card) 90+1'	Report		Stadium: Nuevo Arcángel; Attendance: 18,600; Referee: Iñaki Vicandi Garrido

11 January 2015 18	Granada	1–1	Real Sociedad	Granada
19:00 CET	El-Arabi (yellow card) 27'; Babin (yellow card) 35'; Rico 79' (pen.)	Report	Vela (yellow card) 26', (goal) 36' (pen.); I. Martínez (yellow card) 70'	Stadium: Nuevo Los Cármenes; Attendance: 22,000; Referee: Juan Martínez Munuera

18 January 2015 19	Atlético Madrid	2–0	Granada	Madrid
17:00	Godín (yellow card) 9'; Suárez (yellow card) 27'; Mandžukić 34' (pen.), (yellow card) 73'; García 88'	Report	Bangoura (yellow card) 10'; Sissoko (yellow card) 33'; Nyom (yellow card) 64'	Stadium: Vicente Calderón; Attendance: 42,000; Referee: Ignacio Iglesias Villanueva

25 January 2015 20	Deportivo La Coruña	2–2	Granada	A Coruña
12:00 CET	J. Rodríguez 34', (yellow card) 43'; Lucas 38', (yellow card) 55'; Domínguez (yellow card) 47'; Fariña (red card) 86'	Report	Piti 7'; Juan Carlos (yellow card) 74'; Robert 83'; Rico (yellow card) 87'; Córdoba (yellow card) 90+1'	Stadium: Riazor; Attendance: 17,000; Referee: Carlos del Cerro Grande

31 January 2015 21	Granada	1–0	Elche	Granada
20:00 CET	Nyom (yellow card) 18'; Insúa (yellow card) 47'; Córdoba 56'; Mainz (yellow card) 61'; Bangoura (yellow card) 66'	Report	Suárez (yellow card) 20' (yellow-red card) 70'; Roco (yellow card) 20'; Lombán (yellow card) 31'; Coro (yellow card) 55'; Rodrigues (yellow card) 73'	Stadium: Nuevo Los Cármenes; Attendance: 15,320; Referee: Jesús Gil Manzano

7 February 2015 22	Villarreal	2–0	Granada	Villarreal
18:00 CET	Musacchio 30'; Dorado (yellow card) 76'; J. Dos Santos (yellow card) 87'; Gerard 90+2'	Report	Pérez (yellow card) 82'	Stadium: El Madrigal; Attendance: 16,000; Referee: Alberto Undiano Mallenco

14 February 2015 23	Granada	0–0	Athletic Bilbao	Granada
20:00 CET	Bangoura (yellow card) 25'; Insúa (red card) 68'; Rico (yellow card) 70'; Piti (yellow card) 84'; Córdoba (yellow card) 90'	Report	Muniain (yellow card) 28'; Gurpegui (yellow card) 41'; Aketxe (yellow card) 75'; Laporte (yellow card) 89'	Stadium: Nuevo Los Cármenes; Attendance: 14,879; Referee: Carlos Clos Gómez

23 February 2015 24	Levante	2–1	Granada	Valencia
20:45 CET	Barral (yellow card) 15', (goal) 90+3'; Ramis (red card) 79'; Uche (yellow card) 79'; Toño (yellow card) 84'; Camarasa 88'	Report	El-Arabi 13' (pen.), (red card) 79'; Juan Carlos (yellow card) 22'; Riki (yellow card) 51'; Bangoura (yellow card) 61'; Colunga (red card) 72'; Foulquier (yellow card) 77'; Márquez (yellow card) 81'	Stadium: Ciutat de València; Attendance: 14,000; Referee: Alfonso Álvarez Izquierdo

28 February 2015 25	Granada	1–3	Barcelona	Granada
16:00 CET	Márquez (yellow card) 3'; Rico 53' (pen.); Bangoura (yellow card) 86'	Report	Suárez (yellow card) 15', (goal) 48'; Rakitić 25'; Neymar (yellow card) 55'; Mathieu (yellow card) 58'; Messi 70'	Stadium: Nuevo Los Cármenes; Attendance: 18,119; Referee: Santiago Jaime Latre

7 March 2015 26	Granada	1–0	Málaga	Granada
22:00 CET	Márquez (yellow card) 35'; Robert 57'; Piti (yellow card) 61'; Córdoba (yellow card) 76'; Pérez (yellow card) 90'	Report	Angeleri (yellow card) 8'; Torres (yellow card) 20'; Juanmi (yellow card) 32'; Camacho (yellow card) 67'; Weligton (yellow card) 76'	Stadium: Nuevo Los Cármenes; Attendance: 16,374; Referee: Antonio Mateu Lahoz

14 March 2015 27	Rayo Vallecano	3–1	Granada	Madrid
20:00 CET	Baena (yellow card) 51'; Amaya (yellow card) 61'; Bueno 65', 76', (yellow card) 66'; Embarba 90+4'	Report	Córdoba 8'; Pérez (yellow card) 13'; Insúa (yellow card) 27'	Stadium: Campo de Vallecas; Attendance: 10,952; Referee: Alejandro Hernández Hernández

21 March 2015 28	Granada	0–0	Eibar	Granada
22:00 CET	Pérez (yellow card) 11'; Piti (yellow card) 24'; Murillo (yellow card) 90+3'; Rochina (yellow card) 90+4'	Report	Borja (yellow card) 21'	Stadium: Nuevo Los Cármenes; Attendance: 15,000; Referee: Alberto Undiano Mallenco

4 April 2015 29	Real Madrid	9–1	Granada	Madrid
13:00 CEST	Bale 25'; Ronaldo 30', 36', 38', 54', 89'; Benzema 52', 56'; Mainz 83' (o.g.); Arbeloa (yellow card) 87'	Report	Piti (yellow card) 64'; Robert 74'; Murillo (yellow card) 89'	Stadium: Santiago Bernabéu; Attendance: 71,863; Referee: Jesús Gil Manzano

8 April 2015 30	Granada	1–1	Celta Vigo	Granada
22:00	Robert 3'; Murillo (yellow card) 39' (yellow-red card) 42'; Roberto (yellow card) 41'; Nyom (yellow card) 74'; Córdoba (yellow card) 84'; Iturra (yellow card) 90+6'	Report	Jonny (yellow card) 37'; Cabral (yellow card) 39'; López (yellow card) 59'; Radoja (yellow card) 67'; Hernández (yellow card) 74'; Bongonda 90+3'	Stadium: Nuevo Los Cármenes; Attendance: 14,338; Referee: Alfonso Álvarez Izquierdo

11 April 2015 31	Almería	3–0	Granada	Almería
22:00	Soriano (yellow card) 20'; Bifouma (yellow card) 42'; Thomas 45+1', 87', (yellow card) 46'; Espinosa 59'; Dos Santos (yellow card) 63'	Report	Cala (yellow card) 31'; Nyom (yellow card) 50'; Rico (yellow card) 62'; Insúa (yellow card) 84'	Stadium: Juegos Mediterráneos; Attendance: 14,000; Referee: Santiago Jaime Latre

19 April 2015 32	Granada	1–1	Sevilla	Granada
17:00	Mainz 16'; Rico (yellow card) 65'; Pérez (yellow card) 90+3'	Report	Reyes (yellow card) 6'; Mainz 69' (o.g.); Mbia (yellow card) 79'	Stadium: Nuevo Los Cármenes; Attendance: 18,275; Referee: Xavier Estrada Fernández

27 April 2015 33	Valencia	4–0	Granada	Valencia
--:--	Fuego 26'; Gayà (yellow card) 32'; Parejo 40' (pen.), (yellow card) 56'; Feghouli 85', (yellow card) 85'; Negredo 88'	Report	Insúa (yellow card) 45+1'; Nyom (yellow card) 71'; Rico (yellow card) 74'	Stadium: Mestalla; Attendance: 43,800; Referee: Alberto Undiano Mallenco

30 April 2015 34	Granada	1–2	Espanyol	Granada, Andalusia, Spain
--:--	Candeias (yellow card) 62'; Mainz 73'; Martins (yellow card) 77'	Report	Fuentes (yellow card) 31'; García (yellow card) 38', (goal) 45'; Casilla (yellow card) 79'; Montañés 84'	Stadium: Nuevo Los Cármenes; Attendance: 15,097; Referee: Carlos Velasco Carballo

3 May 2015 35	Getafe	1–2	Granada	Getafe
--:--	Pedro León 45'; Lacen (yellow card) 71'; Alexis (yellow card) 90'; Escudero (yellow card) 90+4'3	Report	El-Arabi 14' (pen.), 59'; Cala (yellow card) 53'; Piti (yellow card) 69'; Mainz (yellow card) 85'; Pérez (yellow card) 90'	Stadium: Coliseum Alfonso Pérez; Attendance: 7,000; Referee: Eduardo Prieto Iglesias

9 May 2015 36	Granada	2–0	Córdoba	Granada
--:--	El-Arabi (yellow card) 25', (goal) 69' (pen.); Mainz 45'; Pérez (yellow card) 58'	Report	López (yellow card) 9' (yellow-red card) 30'; Krhin (yellow card) 65'; Pantić (yellow card) 69'; Cartabia (yellow card) 79' (yellow-red card) 79'	Stadium: Nuevo Los Cármenes; Attendance: 19,266; Referee: Fernando Teixeira Vitienes

16 May 2015 37	Real Sociedad	0–3	Granada	San Sebastián
--:--	Prieto (yellow card) 7'; Castro (yellow card) 85'	Report	Bangoura (yellow card) 26'; El-Arabi 74'; Robert 79'; Márquez (yellow card) 85'; Rochina 88'	Stadium: Anoeta; Attendance: 20,644; Referee: Xavier Estrada Fernández

23 May 2015 38	Granada	0–0	Atlético Madrid	Granada
--:--		Report		Stadium: Nuevo Los Cármenes; Attendance: 20,848; Referee: José González González

=== Copa del Rey ===
==== Round of 32 ====
3 December 2014 First leg	Granada (Spain)	1–0	(Spain) Córdoba	Granada
22:00 CET	Córdoba 25'; Eddy (yellow card) 74'; Mainz (yellow card) 88'	Report	Ekeng (yellow card) 51' (yellow-red card) 70'; Andone (yellow card) 58'; Deivid (yellow card) 89'	Stadium: Nuevo Los Cármenes; Attendance: 5,100; Referee: Fernando Teixeira Vitienes

17 December 2014 Second leg	Córdoba (Spain)	1–1 (1–2 agg.)	(Spain) Granada	Córdoba
22:00 CET	Andone 5'; Crespo (yellow card) 65'; Pantić (yellow card) 87'	Report	Eddy (yellow card) 26'; Nyom (yellow card) 41'; Mainz 60'; Márquez (red card) 66'; Héctor (yellow card) 66'; Success (yellow card) 82'; Juan Carlos (yellow card) 87'; Larsson (yellow card) 89'	Stadium: Nuevo Arcángel; Attendance: 9,000; Referee: Alfonso Álvarez Izquierdo

==== Round of 16 ====
8 January 2015 First leg	Granada (Spain)	1–2	(Spain) Sevilla	Granada
20:00 CET	Héctor (yellow card) 37'; Sissoko (yellow card) 38'; Bangoura 90+3'	Report	Deulofeu 31'; Krychowiak (yellow card) 41'; Iborra (yellow card) 48'; Gameiro 53'	Stadium: Nuevo Los Cármenes; Attendance: 12,000; Referee: Antonio Mateu Lahoz

14 January 2015 Second leg	Sevilla (Spain)	4–0 (6–1 agg.)	(Spain) Granada	Seville
22:00 CET	Gameiro 18', 55'; Aspas 27'; Suárez 64'; Reyes (yellow card) 86'	Report	Foulquier (yellow card) 68'; Nyom (yellow card) 20'; Roberto (yellow card) 90+1'	Stadium: Ramón Sánchez Pizjuán; Attendance: 14,104; Referee: Carlos Clos Gómez

== Statistics ==
=== Appearances and goals ===
Updated as of 30 May 2015.

No.	Pos	Nat	Player	Total		La Liga		Copa del Rey	
No.	Pos	Nat	Player	Apps	Goals	Apps	Goals	Apps	Goals
1	GK	(Spain) ESP	Oier	16	0	14	0	2	0
2	DF	(Cameroon) CMR	Allan Nyom	38	1	34	1	4	0
3	DF	(Portugal) POR	Luís Martins	5	0	1+2	0	2	0
4	MF	(Spain) ESP	Fran Rico	32	3	28+3	3	1	0
5	DF	(Spain) ESP	Diego Mainz	27	4	18+5	3	4	1
6	DF	(Martinique) MTQ	Jean-Sylvain Babin	37	1	34	1	2+1	0
7	MF	(Portugal) POR	Daniel Candeias	11	0	5+6	0	0	0
8	MF	(Spain) ESP	Javi Márquez	26	0	15+10	0	1	0
9	FW	(Morocco) MAR	Youssef El-Arabi	28	8	24+4	8	0	0
10	MF	(Spain) ESP	Piti	33	1	28+5	1	0	0
11	FW	(Spain) ESP	Riki	11	0	0+9	0	2	0
12	MF	(Spain) ESP	Rubén Pérez	14	0	13+1	0	0	0
13	GK	(Spain) ESP	Roberto	25	0	23	0	2	0
14	MF	(Spain) ESP	Eddy	8	0	1+4	0	3	0
15	MF	(Guinea) GUI	Lass Bangoura	15	1	12+2	0	0+1	1
16	MF	(Chile) CHI	Manuel Iturra	33	0	27+3	0	2+1	0
17	MF	(France) FRA	Abdoul Sissoko	13	0	10+1	0	2	0
18	FW	(Colombia) COL	Jhon Córdoba	28	5	16+10	4	1+1	1
19	DF	(Spain) ESP	Cala	7	0	6+1	0	0	0
20	MF	(Spain) ESP	Juankar	24	0	15+6	0	2+1	0
21	MF	(Spain) ESP	Rober	17	5	12+5	5	0	0
22	DF	(France) FRA	Dimitri Foulquier	27	0	18+7	0	2	0
23	FW	(Spain) ESP	Rubén Rochina	19	2	12+7	2	0	0
24	DF	(Colombia) COL	Jeison Murillo	19	0	18+1	0	0	0
25	DF	(Argentina) ARG	Emanuel Insúa	12	0	12	0	0	0
26	MF	(The Gambia) GAM	Sulayman Marreh	2	0	1	0	0+1	0
27	FW	(Venezuela) VEN	Darwin Machís	4	0	2+1	0	0+1	0
29	FW	(Nigeria) NGR	Isaac Success	23	1	9+10	1	3+1	0
35	GK	(North Macedonia) MKD	Stole Dimitrievski	1	0	1	0	0	0
—	FW	(Spain) ESP	Adrián Colunga	4	0	3+1	0	0	0
Players who have made an appearance or had a squad number this season but have been loaned out or transferred
7	MF	(Spain) ESP	Héctor Yuste	10	0	4+2	0	4	0
12	DF	(Cameroon) CMR	Dany Nounkeu	1	0	0	0	1	0
19	MF	(Sweden) SWE	Daniel Larsson	4	0	0+1	0	2+1	0
21	FW	(Spain) ESP	Alfredo Ortuño	7	0	2+3	0	1+1	0

=== Goals ===
Updated as of 30 May 2015.

Rank	Player	Position	La Liga	Copa	Total
1	(Morocco) Youssef El-Arabi	ST	8	0	8
2	(Spain) Rober	RM	5	0	5
2	(Colombia) Jhon Córdoba	ST	4	1	5
4	(Spain) Diego Mainz	CB	3	1	4
5	(Spain) Fran Rico	CM	3	0	3
6	(Spain) Rubén Rochina	ST	2	0	2
7	(Spain) Piti	AM	1	0	1
7	(Nigeria) Isaac Success	ST	1	0	1
7	(Cameroon) Allan Nyom	RB	1	0	1
7	(Martinique) Jean-Sylvain Babin	CB	1	0	1
7	(Guinea) Lass Bangoura	RM	0	1	1
Total			29	3	32

=== Discipline ===
N	P	Nat.	Name	La Liga			Copa del Rey			Total			Notes
N	P	Nat.	Name	Yellow card	Second yellow card	Red card	Yellow card	Second yellow card	Red card	Yellow card	Second yellow card	Red card	Notes
4	DF	(Spain)	Fran Rico	5						5			
22	DF	(France)	Dimitri Foulquier	4						4			
2	DF	(Cameroon)	Allan Nyom	3						3			
7	MF	(Spain)	Héctor Yuste	2						2			
18	FW	(Colombia)	Jhon Córdoba	2						2			
23	FW	(Spain)	Rubén Rochina	2						2			
9	FW	(Morocco)	Youssef El-Arabi	2						2			
16	MF	(Chile)	Manuel Iturra	2						2			
10	MF	(Spain)	Piti	2						2			
26	MF	(The Gambia)	Sulayman Marreh	1						1			

Last updated: 3 November 2014
Source: Matches
Ordered by (red card) , (second yellow card) and (yellow card)
(yellow card) = Number of bookings; (second yellow card) = Number of sending offs after a second yellow card; (red card) = Number of sending offs by a direct red card.
