= 2013–14 Granada CF season =

Granada
2013–14 season
- President: Quique Pina
- Head coach: Lucas Alcaraz
- Stadium: Los Cármenes
- La Liga: 15th
- Copa del Rey: Round of 32
- Top goalscorer: League: Youssef El-Arabi (12 goals); All: Youssef El-Arabi (12 goals)
Home colours	Away colours	Third colours

The 2013–14 Granada CF season was the 80th season in club history and the 20th in the top-flight of Spanish football.

== Matches ==
=== Legend ===
Win Draw Loss Postponed

=== La Liga ===
18 August 2013 1	Osasuna	1–2	Granada	Pamplona
15:00 CEST	Loé (yellow card) 27'; Puñal 58'	Report	Yebda (yellow card) 32', (goal) 45+2'; El-Arabi 38'; Piti (yellow card) 49'; Roberto (yellow card) 77'; Nyom (yellow card) 90+3'	Stadium: El Sadar; Attendance: 13,427; Referee: José González González

26 August 2013 2	Granada	0–1	Real Madrid	Granada
	Piti (yellow card) 55'; Iturra (yellow card) 79'; Mainz (yellow card) 85'; Brahimi (yellow card) 85'	Report	Benzema 10'; Pepe (yellow card) 36'; Marcelo (yellow card) 38'	Stadium: Los Cármenes; Attendance: 16,626; Referee: Xavier Estrada Fernández

31 August 2013 3	Celta de Vigo	1–1	Granada	Vigo
	Rafinha 29'; Fontàs (yellow card) 77'	Report	Benítez (yellow card) 43'; Piti 62'; Rico (yellow card) 76'	Stadium: Balaídos; Attendance: 21,774; Referee: Juan Martínez Munuera

15 September 2013 4	Granada	0–1	Espanyol	Granada
	Diakhaté (yellow card) 40'; Recio (yellow card) 76'; Ighalo (yellow card) 82' (yellow-red card) 82'; Nyom (yellow card) 87'	Report	Lanzarote (yellow card) 22', (goal) 76'; Fuentes (yellow card) 39'; J. López (yellow card) 72'	Stadium: Los Cármenes; Attendance: 13,358; Referee: Ignacio Iglesias Villanueva

22 September 2013 5	Real Betis	0–0	Granada	Seville
	Chica (yellow card) 12'; Amaya (yellow card) 40'; Paulão (yellow card) 60'; Nacho (yellow card) 62'	Report	Recio (yellow card) 14'	Stadium: Benito Villamarín; Attendance: 34,000; Referee: Miguel Ayza Gámez

25 September 2013 6	Granada	0–1	Valencia	Granada
	Buonanotte (yellow card) 32'; Nyom (yellow card) 33'; Pereira (yellow card) 54'; Angulo (yellow card) 58'	Report	Fuego (yellow card) 18'; Jonas (yellow card) 28', (goal) 90+4'	Stadium: Los Cármenes; Attendance: 13,060; Referee: Fernando Teixeira Vitienes

30 September 2013 7	Granada	2–0	Athletic Bilbao	Granada
	El-Arabi 53' (pen.), 60'; Iturra (yellow card) 60'; Recio (yellow card) 82'	Report	Muniain (yellow card) 82'	Stadium: Los Cármenes; Attendance: 10,000; Referee: Alfonso Álvarez Izquierdo

4 October 2013 8	Villarreal	3–0	Granada	Villarreal
	Bruno 30'; G. Dos Santos 49'; Pina 82'	Report	Buonanotte (yellow card) 81'	Stadium: El Madrigal; Attendance: 15,793; Referee: Alejandro Hernández Hernández

20 October 2013 9	Granada	0–2	Getafe	Granada
	Diakhaté (yellow card) 12' (yellow-red card) 32'; Roberto (yellow card) 32'; Buonanotte (yellow card) 32'; Rico (yellow card) 82'	Report	Murillo 47' (o.g.); Marica (yellow card) 50'; Pedro León 55'; Lago (yellow card) 84'	Stadium: Los Cármenes; Attendance: 13,319; Referee: Antonio Mateu Lahoz

26 October 2013 10	Elche	0–1	Granada	Elche
	Márquez (yellow card) 30'; Suárez (yellow card) 90+5'	Report	Iturra (yellow card) 13', (goal) 26'; Roberto (yellow card) 71'; Nyom (yellow card) 89'	Stadium: Manuel Martínez Valero; Attendance: 24,800; Referee: Carlos del Cerro Grande

31 October 2013 11	Granada	1–2	Atlético Madrid	Granada
	Nyom (yellow card) 45+1'; Murillo (yellow card) 77'; Ighalo 90'	Report	Juanfran (yellow card) 34'; Costa 38' (pen.); Filipe Luís (yellow card) 65' (yellow-red card) 90'; Villa 78' (pen.); Courtois (yellow card) 90+4'	Stadium: Los Cármenes; Attendance: 16,125; Referee: José González González

3 November 2013 12	Levante	0–1	Granada	Valencia
	López (yellow card) 52'; García (yellow card) 52'	Report	Murillo (yellow card) 65'; Angulo (yellow card) 70'; Diakhaté (yellow card) 86'	Stadium: Ciutat de València; Attendance: 13,500; Referee: Carlos Clos Gómez

8 November 2013 13	Granada	3–1	Málaga	Granada
	Yebda (yellow card) 34'; Brahimi (yellow card) 44'; El-Arabi 48', 59', 77'; Buonanotte (yellow card) 53'	Report	Juanmi 54'; Sánchez (yellow card) 80'; Gámez (yellow card) 85'; Angeleri (yellow card) 88'	Stadium: Los Cármenes; Attendance: 14,863; Referee: Eduardo Prieto Iglesias

23 November 2011 14	Barcelona	4–0	Granada	Barcelona
	Iniesta 20' (pen.); Neymar (yellow card) 28'; Fàbregas 40' (pen.); Busquets (yellow card) 43'; Sánchez 71'; Pedro 90'	Report	Diakhaté (yellow card) 19'; Iturra (yellow card) 25' (yellow-red card) 66'; El-Arabi (yellow card) 26'	Stadium: Camp Nou; Attendance: 71,518; Referee: Antonio Mateu Lahoz

1 December 2013 15	Granada	1–2	Sevilla	Granada
	Rico (yellow card) 16'; Brahimi 61' (pen.); Yebda (yellow card) 80'; Buonanotte (yellow card) 84'; Ighalo (yellow card) 89'	Report	Bacca 23'; Carriço (yellow card) 25'; Mbia (yellow card) 29'; Rakitić (yellow card) 57'; Jairo (yellow card) 59'; Iborra (yellow card) 60'; Figueiras (yellow card) 82'; Gameiro 87', (yellow card) 89'	Stadium: Los Cármenes; Attendance: 17,500; Referee: Carlos del Cerro Grande

14 December 2013 16	Rayo Vallecano	0–2	Granada	Madrid
	Gálvez (yellow card) 12'; Galeano (yellow card) 23'; Nacho (yellow card) 37' (yellow-red card) 43'; Cobeño (yellow card) 43'; Larrivey (yellow card) 80'	Report	Rico 35', (yellow card) 76'; Piti (yellow card) 36'; Yebda (yellow card) 45'; Angulo (yellow card) 75'; Riki (yellow card) 83', (goal) 89'	Stadium: Campo de Vallecas; Attendance: 8,297; Referee: César Muñiz Fernández

21 December 2013 17	Granada	1–3	Real Sociedad	Granada
	Piti 37'; Brahimi (yellow card) 44'; Recio (yellow card) 51'; Riki (yellow card) 77'	Report	Vela 29', 64'; Griezmann 42'; Prieto (yellow card) 72'	Stadium: Los Cármenes; Attendance: 15,889; Referee: Carlos Clos Gómez

4 January 2014 18	Almería	3–0	Granada	Almería
	Dubarbier 14'; Verza 28' (pen.), (yellow card) 42'; Soriano (yellow card) 36'; Azeez (yellow card) 70'; Vidal 79'	Report	Diakhaté (yellow card) 25'; Mainz (yellow card) 27'; Yebda (yellow card) 56'	Stadium: Mediterráneo; Attendance: 8,692; Referee: Xavier Estrada Fernández

10 January 2014 19	Granada	4–0	Real Valladolid	Granada
	Murillo 12'; Recio 22', 55'; El-Arabi 78'	Report	Ramos (yellow card) 24'; Rukavina (yellow card) 31'; Rueda (yellow card) 74'	Stadium: Los Cármenes; Attendance: 12,338; Referee: Miguel Ayza Gámez

18 January 2014 20	Granada	0–0	Osasuna	Granada
	Rico (yellow card) 34'	Report	Bertrán (yellow card) 24'; Lolo (yellow card) 73'; Arribas (yellow card) 79'	Stadium: Los Cármenes; Attendance: 11,536; Referee: Juan Martínez Munuera

25 January 2014 21	Real Madrid	2–0	Granada	Madrid
	Ramos (yellow card) 17'; Benzema (yellow card) 54', (goal) 74'; Ronaldo 56'; Modrić (yellow card) 60'; Di María (yellow card) 65'	Report	Murillo (yellow card) 9'; Iturra (yellow card) 62'	Stadium: Santiago Bernabéu; Attendance: 73,874; Referee: Jesús Gil Manzano

31 January 2014 22	Granada	1–2	Celta de Vigo	Granada
	Nyom (yellow card) 26'; El-Arabi 41'; Murillo (yellow card) 90'	Report	Cabral (yellow card) 14', (goal) 28'; Oubiña (yellow card) 21'; Mallo (yellow card) 61'; Nolito (yellow card) 65'; Fernández 88'	Stadium: Los Cármenes; Attendance: 16,000; Referee: Antonio Mateu Lahoz

7 February 2014 23	Espanyol	1–0	Granada	Barcelona
	Álvarez (red card) 30'; Casilla (yellow card) 40'; García (yellow card) 41'; Colotto (yellow card) 43'; Stuani (yellow card) 57'; Moreno 79'	Report	Rico (yellow card) 24'; Nyom (yellow card) 68'; Iturra (yellow card) 73'; Ilori (yellow card) 75'; El-Arabi (yellow card) 90+1'	Stadium: Cornellà-El Prat; Attendance: 14,011; Referee: Ignacio Iglesias Villanueva

16 February 2014 24	Granada	1–0	Real Betis	Granada
	Nyom (yellow card) 29'; Piti 31', (yellow card) 31'; Roberto (yellow card) 78'; Benítez (red card) 79'; Riki (yellow card) 88'	Report	Nono (yellow card) 11'; Amaya (yellow card) 27' (yellow-red card) 90+2'; Baptistão (yellow card) 83'; N'Diaye (yellow card) 86'	Stadium: Los Cármenes; Attendance: 18,000; Referee: José Teixeira Vitienes

23 February 2014 25	Valencia	2–1	Granada	Valencia
	Keita (yellow card) 25'; Cartabia (yellow card) 42'; Alcácer 64', (yellow card) 69'; Míchel (yellow card) 77'; Parejo (yellow card) 77'; Vezo 90+1'	Report	Piti 47'; Murillo (yellow card) 56'; Nyom (yellow card) 75'; Iturra (yellow card) 77'	Stadium: Mestalla; Attendance: 37,700; Referee: José González González

28 February 2014 26	Athletic Bilbao	4–0	Granada	Bilbao
	Aduriz 7', 18', 74' (pen.); Gurpegui 80'	Report	Fatau (yellow card) 2'; Brahimi (yellow card) 47'; Mainz (red card) 73'	Stadium: San Mamés; Attendance: 33,000; Referee: Alfonso Álvarez Izquierdo

8 March 2014 27	Granada	2–0	Villarreal	Granada
	Rico 23' (pen.); Riki (yellow card) 26'; El-Arabi 33'; Brahimi (yellow card) 65'; Iturra (yellow card) 83'; Recio (yellow card) 90+2'	Report	Gabriel (yellow card) 46'	Stadium: Los Cármenes; Attendance: 13,612; Referee: César Muñiz Fernández

14 March 2014 28	Getafe	3–3	Granada	Getafe
	Marica 6', (yellow card) 53'; Escudero (yellow card) 24' (yellow-red card) 80'; López 38'; Lafita 72'; Valera (yellow card) 82'; Sarabia (yellow card) 84'; Alexis (yellow card) 85'	Report	Riki 35'; Murillo (yellow card) 39'; Iturra (yellow card) 53' (yellow-red card) 69'; El-Arabi 62', 77'	Stadium: Coliseum Alfonso Pérez; Attendance: 6,500; Referee: Miguel Ayza Gámez

22 March 2014 29	Granada	1–0	Elche	Granada
	Rico (yellow card) 47'; Brahimi 63'	Report	Săpunaru (yellow card) 13' (yellow-red card) 71'; Sánchez (yellow card) 73'; Boakye (yellow card) 80'; Fidel (yellow card) 85'	Stadium: Los Cármenes; Attendance: 18,231; Referee: Alejandro Hernández Hernández

26 March 2014 30	Atlético Madrid	1–0	Granada	Madrid
	Gabi (yellow card) 40'; Costa 63'	Report	Angulo (yellow card) 29'; Coeff (yellow card) 39'; Brahimi (yellow card) 44'	Stadium: Vicente Calderón; Attendance: 41,200; Referee: Juan Martínez Munuera

31 March 2014 31	Granada	0–2	Levante	Granada
	El-Arabi (yellow card) 43'; Murillo (yellow card) 90+4'	Report	García (yellow card) 21'; Navarro 49', (yellow card) 55'; Barral (yellow card) 61'; López 88'; Ivanschitz (yellow card) 88'; Juanfran (yellow card) 90+4'	Stadium: Los Cármenes; Attendance: 15,338; Referee: Alfonso Álvarez Izquierdo

6 April 2014 32	Málaga	4–1	Granada	Málaga
	Camacho 14', 37'; Ferreira (yellow card) 17'; Antunes (yellow card) 20'; Amrabat 50' (pen.); Caballero (yellow card) 65'; Juanmi 74'	Report	El-Arabi (yellow card) 24', (goal) 78'; Murillo (yellow card) 49'; Buonanotte (yellow card) 57'; Angulo (yellow card) 59'; Iturra (yellow card) 88'	Stadium: La Rosaleda; Attendance: 21,000; Referee: Fernando Teixeira Vitienes

12 April 2014 33	Granada	1–0	Barcelona	Granada
	Brahimi 16'	Report	Neymar (yellow card) 45'; Messi (yellow card) 65'; Busquets (yellow card) 66'	Stadium: Los Cármenes; Attendance: 18,024; Referee: Carlos Delgado Ferreiro

20 April 2014 34	Sevilla	4–0	Granada	Seville
	Carriço (yellow card) 10'; Mainz 14' (o.g.); Gameiro 51'; Mbia 58'; Vitolo 68'; Navarro (yellow card) 80'	Report		Stadium: Ramón Sánchez Pizjuán; Attendance: 23,483; Referee: José Teixeira Vitienes

26 April 2014 35	Granada	0–3	Rayo Vallecano	Granada
	Recio (yellow card) 36'; Brahimi (yellow card) 41' (yellow-red card) 51'; El-Arabi (yellow card) 83'	Report	Nacho (yellow card) 15'; Castro (yellow card) 37'; Gálvez (yellow card) 41'; Saúl 54'; Larrivey 59'; Rochina (yellow card) 63'; Fernández 86'	Stadium: Los Cármenes; Attendance: 20,445; Referee: Antonio Mateu Lahoz

5 May 2014 36	Real Sociedad	1–1	Granada	San Sebastián
	Seferovic (yellow card) 30'; González (red card) 57'; Vela 78'	Report	Riki (yellow card) 43'; Recio (yellow card) 48' (yellow-red card) 54'; Murillo (yellow card) 58'; Ighalo 90+3', (yellow card) 90+5'	Stadium: Anoeta; Attendance: 13,813; Referee: Fernando Teixeira Vitienes

11 May 2014 37	Granada	0–2	Almería	Granada
	Rico (yellow card) 18'; Iturra (yellow card) 25'; Ilori (yellow card) 48'; Murillo (red card) 82'	Report	Verza 19' (pen.); Torsiglieri (yellow card) 45'; Rafita (yellow card) 70'; Vidal 83' (pen.)	Stadium: Los Cármenes; Attendance: 17,958; Referee: Jesús Gil Manzano

18 May 2014 38	Real Valladolid	0–1	Granada	Valladolid
	Óscar (yellow card) 81'	Report	Mitrović 44' (o.g.); Piti (yellow card) 64'; Roberto (yellow card) 80'	Stadium: José Zorrilla; Attendance: 25,311; Referee: Carlos Clos Gómez

=== Copa del Rey ===
8 December 2013 First leg	Alcorcón	0–2	Granada	Alcorcón
	Serrán (yellow card) 16'; Sánchez (yellow card) 28'; Martínez (yellow card) 57'; Mora (yellow card) 58'	Report	Iturra (yellow card) 11'; Ighalo 30', 81'; Recio (yellow card) 53'; Mainz (yellow card) 61'	Stadium: Santo Domingo; Attendance: 2,500; Referee: Xavier Estrada Fernández

17 December 2013 Second leg	Granada	0–2 (a.e.t.) (4–5 p)	Alcorcón	Granada
	Yebda (yellow card) 117'	Report	Verdés 41'; Martínez (yellow card) 68'; Nagore (yellow card) 72', (goal) 82'; Camille (yellow card) 88'; Quini (yellow card) 90'; Jony (yellow card) 118'	Stadium: Los Cármenes; Attendance: 12,536; Referee: Eduardo Prieto Iglesias
