= 2011–12 Rayo Vallecano season =

Rayo Vallecano
2011–12 season
- President: Raúl Martín Presa
- Head coach: José Ramón Sandoval
- Stadium: Estadio Teresa Rivero
- La Liga: 15th
- Copa del Rey: Round of 32
Home colours	Away colours

The 2011–12 Rayo Vallecano season was the club's 78th season in history and its 13th season in La Liga, the top division of Spanish football, following promotion after finishing as runners-up in the Segunda División. It covers a period from 1 July 2011 to 30 June 2012.

Rayo Vallecano will compete for their second La Liga title and will enter the Copa del Rey in the Round of 32.

== Players ==
=== Squad information ===
Updated 3 September 2010. Note: Flags indicate national team as defined under FIFA eligibility rules; some limited exceptions apply. Players may hold more than one non-FIFA nationality.

No.	Pos.	Nation	Player
1	GK	ESP	David Cobeño
2	DF	ESP	Tito
3	DF	ESP	José Manuel Casado
4	DF	ESP	Antonio Amaya (on loan from Wigan Athletic)
5	DF	ESP	Alejandro Arribas
6	MF	ESP	Yuma
7	MF	ESP	José Movilla
8	MF	ESP	Míchel
9	MF	ARG	Emiliano Armenteros (on loan from Sevilla)
10	FW	ESP	Piti
11	FW	ESP	David Aganzo

No.	Pos.	Nation	Player
13	GK	ESP	Dani Giménez
14	MF	ESP	Néstor Susaeta
15	DF	ESP	Salva
16	MF	ESP	Rafa García
17	FW	ESP	Juli
18	MF	ESP	Javi Fuego
19	DF	COL	Brayan Angulo
21	DF	ESP	Carlos de la Vega
23	DF	ESP	Coke
24	FW	ARG	Óscar Trejo (on loan from Mallorca)
25	FW	MNE	Andrija Delibašić
-	DF	BRA	Sueliton

=== Transfers ===
==== In ====
No.	Pos.	Nat.	Name	Age	EU	Moving from	Type	Transfer window	Ends	Transfer fee	Source
	RB	(Brazil)	Sueliton	24	Non-EU	São José (Brazil)	Transfer	Summer	2013	Free	AS.com
	FW	(Spain)	Quero	26	EU	Las Palmas	Loan return	Summer		N/A	

Total expenditure: ▼€0 million

==== Out ====
No.	Pos.	Nat.	Name	Age	EU	Moving to	Type	Transfer window	Transfer fee	Source
4	CB	(Spain)	Amaya	28	EU	Wigan Athletic (England)	Loan return	Summer	N/A	
23	DF	(Spain)	Coke	24	EU	Sevilla	Transfer	Summer	€1.7M	AS.com
9	MF	(Argentina)	Armenteros	25	Non-EU	Sevilla	Loan return	Summer	N/A	
24	FW	(Argentina)	Trejo	23	Non-EU	Mallorca	Loan return	Summer	N/A	AS.com
19	LB	(Colombia)	Angulo	21	Non-EU	Leixões (Portugal)	Loan return	Summer	N/A	
27	MF	(Spain)	García	20	EU	Córdoba	Transfer	Summer	Free	

Total income: ▲€1.7 million

== Club ==
=== Coaching staff ===
Position	Staff
Head coach	José Ramón Sandoval
Assistant coach	Ismael Martínez Rodríguez
Goalkeeping coach	Alberto Garmendia Martínez
Medical services	Carlos Beceiro Mosquera
Physical trainers	Ignacio Sancho García, Víctor Paredes Hernández
Physiotherapists	Miguel Ángel Cordero Mendoza, Marcos Marín Curbelo
Delegate	Miguel Ortiz
Kit managers	Isidoro Prieto González, Francisco Jiménez
Scout	Diego Pérez Castillo

Source: Rayovallecano.es

== Competitions ==
=== La Liga ===
==== League table ====
Pos	Team	Pld	W	D	L	GF	GA	GD	Pts
13	Real Betis	38	13	8	17	47	56	−9	47 (Note: GET: 8 pts; RSO: 5 pts; BET: 2 pts)
14	Espanyol	38	12	10	16	46	56	−10	46
15	Rayo Vallecano	38	13	4	21	53	73	−20	43 (Note: RVA 0–0 ZAR; ZAR 1–2 RVA)
16	Zaragoza	38	12	7	19	36	61	−25	43
17	Granada	38	12	6	20	35	56	−21	42

Source: ESPN
Rules for classification: 1st points; 2nd head-to-head points; 3rd head-to-head goal difference; 4th head-to-head goals scored; 5th goal difference; 6th number of goals scored; 7th Fair-play points

==== Results summary ====
Overall								Home						Away					
Pld	W	D	L	GF	GA	GD	Pts	W	D	L	GF	GA	GD	W	D	L	GF	GA	GD
16	4	4	8	17	25	−8	16	2	1	4	9	8	+1	2	3	4	8	17	−9

Last updated: 7 July 2011.
Source: Competitive matches

==== Results by round ====
Round	1	2	3	4	5	6	7	8	9	10	11	12	13	14	15	16	17	18	19	20	21	22	23	24	25	26	27	28	29	30	31	32	33	34	35	36	37	38
Ground	A	H	A	H	A	A	H	A	H	A	H	A	H	A	A	H	H	A	H	H	A	H	A	H	H	A	H	A	H	A	H	A	H	A	H	A	A	H
Result	D	D	W	L	L	D	L	W	W	L	W	D	L	L	L	L	W	W	L	L	W	W	W	L	W	L	W	L	L	L	W	L	L	L	L	L	L	W
Position	15	14	15	11	14	16	16	17	16	11	13	9	11	13	13	15	17	15	13	14	18	17	13	9	12	9	11	10	11	13	15	13	14	15	16	17	17	15

Updated to match(es) played on 7 July 2011. Source: La Liga
A = Away; H = Home; W = Win; D = Draw; L = Loss

==== Matches ====
28 August 2011 1	Athletic Bilbao	1–1	Rayo Vallecano	Bilbao
--:-- CET	Iturraspe 56', (yellow card) 90+1'	Report	Movilla 62'; Arribas (yellow card) 73'; Piti (yellow card) 74'; Casado (yellow card) 77'	Stadium: San Mamés; Attendance: 35,000; Referee: José Teixeira Vitienes

11 September 2011 2	Rayo Vallecano	0–0	Zaragoza	Madrid
--:-- CET	Botelho (yellow card) 34'; Casado (yellow card) 45'; Michu (yellow card) 65'; Delibašić (yellow card) 85'	Report	Juárez (yellow card) 19'; Mateos (yellow card) 55'; Postiga (yellow card) 59'; Da Silva	Stadium: Campo de Vallecas; Attendance: 13,000; Referee: Alfonso Álvarez Izquierdo

18 September 2011 3	Getafe	0–1	Rayo Vallecano	Getafe
--:-- CET	Masilela (yellow card) 13'; Pérez (yellow card) 54'; Ríos (yellow card) 90'	Report	Michu 4', (yellow card) 81'; Botelho (yellow card) 39'; Arribas (yellow card) 46'; Casado (yellow card) 65'; Tito (yellow card) 78'	Stadium: Coliseum Alfonso Pérez; Attendance: 10,000; Referee: Pedro Pérez Montero

21 September 2011 4	Rayo Vallecano	1–2	Levante	Madrid
--:-- CET	Delibašić (yellow card) 39'; Piti (yellow card) 47'; Tamudo 72' (pen.); Botelho (red card) 78'	Report	Valdo 10'; P. López (yellow card) 26'; Ballesteros 29'; Munúa (yellow card) 88'	Stadium: Campo de Vallecas; Attendance: 13,950; Referee: Carlos Clos Gómez

24 September 2011 5	Real Madrid	6–2	Rayo Vallecano	Madrid
--:-- CET	Di María (yellow card) 17' (yellow-red card) 56'; Ronaldo 38', 51' (pen.), 84' (pen.); Higuaín 45'; Alonso (yellow card) 57'; Varane 67'; Benzema 73'	Report	Michu 1', 55'; Arribas (yellow card) 45'; Movilla (yellow card) 50'; Bangoura (yellow card) 67'; Giménez (yellow card) 83'	Stadium: Santiago Bernabéu; Attendance: 72,000; Referee: José Paradas Romero

1 October 2011 6	Racing Santander	1–1	Rayo Vallecano	Santander
--:-- CET	Álvaro (yellow card) 43'; Adrián 59'	Report	Tamudo 20'; García (yellow card) 55'; Tito (yellow card) 71'; Botelho (yellow card) 80'; Casado (yellow card) 90+2'	Stadium: El Sardinero; Attendance: 10,000; Referee: Antonio Mateu Lahoz

16 October 2011 7	Rayo Vallecano	0–1	Espanyol	Madrid
--:-- CET	Fuego (yellow card) 80'; Arribas (yellow card) 89'; Tamudo (yellow card) 89'	Report	Márquez (yellow card) 40'; Romaric 56', (yellow card) 61'; Amat (yellow card) 90'	Stadium: Campo de Vallecas; Attendance: 11,000; Referee: Ignacio Iglesias Villanueva

23 October 2011 8	Betis	0–2	Rayo Vallecano	Seville
--:-- CET	Chica (yellow card) 11'; Amaya (yellow card) 69'; Mario (yellow card) 88'	Report	Tito (yellow card) 31'; Casado (yellow card) 47'; Bangoura 80'; Botelho (yellow card) 84'; Koke 89' (pen.)	Stadium: Benito Villamarín; Attendance: 36,000; Referee: Alberto Undiano Mallenco

26 October 2011 9	Rayo Vallecano	2–0	Málaga	Madrid
--:-- CET	Botelho 7'; Tito (yellow card) 41'; Figueras (yellow card) 44'; Tamudo 70'	Report	Toulalan (yellow card) 29'; Eliseu (red card) 36'; Joaquín (yellow card) 81'; Gámez (yellow card) 83'	Stadium: Campo de Vallecas; Attendance: 10,000; Referee: Miguel Ayza Gámez

29 October 2011 10	Villarreal	2–0	Rayo Vallecano	Villarreal
--:-- CET	Bruno 20', (yellow card) 71'; Valero 67'; Catalá (yellow card) 73'; López (yellow card) 85'	Report	Figueras (yellow card) 20'; Arribas (yellow card) 34'; Piti (yellow card) 35'; Fuego (yellow card) 39'; Michu (yellow card) 72'	Stadium: El Madrigal; Attendance: 14,000; Referee: Javier Turienzo Álvarez

6 November 2011 11	Rayo Vallecano	4–0	Real Sociedad	Madrid
--:-- CET	Piti 12' (pen.); Michu 49', 62'; Figueras (yellow card) 56'; Trashorras 72'	Report	I. Martínez (red card) 12'; Estrada (yellow card) 58'	Stadium: Campo de Vallecas; Attendance: 11,000; Referee: César Muñiz Fernández

20 November 2011 12	Osasuna	0–0	Rayo Vallecano	Pamplona
--:-- CET	Flaño (yellow card) 65'; Rubén (yellow card) 86'; Timor (yellow card) 90'	Report	Casado (yellow card) 36'; Figueras (yellow card) 54'; Fuego (yellow card) 59'; Michu (yellow card) 89'; Arribas (yellow card) 90+2'	Stadium: El Sadar; Attendance: 16,000; Referee: Ignacio Iglesias Villanueva

26 November 2011 13	Rayo Vallecano	1–2	Valencia	Madrid
--:-- CET	Fuego (yellow card) 48'; Tamudo 84'; Tito (yellow card) 88'	Report	Jonas 21'; Albelda (yellow card) 41'; T. Costa 57'; Alba (yellow card) 90+1'; Aduriz (yellow card) 90+2'	Stadium: Campo de Vallecas; Attendance: 13,000; Referee: Xavier Estrada Fernández

29 November 2011 14	Barcelona	4–0	Rayo Vallecano	Barcelona
--:-- CET	Sánchez 29', 41'; Villa 44'; Messi 49'; Valdés (yellow card) 81'; Piqué (yellow card) 84'	Report	Bangoura (yellow card) 40'; Figueras (yellow card) 45'; Arribas (yellow card) 60'	Stadium: Camp Nou; Attendance: 75,000; Referee: Miguel Pérez Lasa

4 December 2011 15	Atlético Madrid	3–1	Rayo Vallecano	Madrid
--:-- CET	Gabi 25'; Diego (yellow card) 69'; Falcao 75'; Salvio 90'	Report	Fuego (yellow card) 60'; Bangoura (yellow card) 62'; Figueras (yellow card) 78'; Gabi 90+1' (o.g.)	Stadium: Vicente Calderón; Attendance: 39,000; Referee: Carlos Clos Gómez

11 December 2011 16	Rayo Vallecano	1–3	Sporting Gijón	Madrid
--:-- CET	Arribas (yellow card) 47'; Tito (yellow card) 84'; Michu 90+1'	Report	Barral 10'; Novo 37', 66'; Botía (yellow card) 51'; Canella (yellow card) 69'	Stadium: Campo de Vallecas; Attendance: 10,100; Referee: Antonio Mateu Lahoz

8 January 2012 17	Rayo Vallecano	2–1	Sevilla	Madrid
--:-- CET	Michu 45+1'; Casado (yellow card) 51'; Tamudo 51'; Piti (yellow card) 70'; Arribas (yellow card) 82'; Diamanka (yellow card) 90+5'	Report	Fazio (yellow card) 43'; Escudé 62', (yellow card) 71'; Navarro (yellow card) 81'; Medel (yellow card) 90+5'	Stadium: Campo de Vallecas; Attendance: 10,000; Referee: José González González

14 January 2012 18	Granada	1–2	Rayo Vallecano	Granada
--:-- CET	Geijo (yellow card) 60'; Nyom (yellow card) 61'; M. Rico (yellow card) 64'; Benítez (yellow card) 69'; Jara (yellow card) 72'; F. Rico 88'; López (red card) 90+3'	Report	Michu 26'; Movilla (yellow card) 36'; Piti 53'; Casado (yellow card) 72'; Tamudo (yellow card) 73'	Stadium: Los Cármenes; Attendance: 22,500; Referee: Miguel Ayza Gámez

22 January 2012 19	Rayo Vallecano	0–1	Mallorca	Madrid
--:-- CET	Trashorras (yellow card) 72'	Report	Martí (yellow card) 31'; Tissone (yellow card) 36'; Ramis 57'; Flores (yellow card) 77'; Aouate (yellow card) 89'; Pereira (yellow card) 89'	Stadium: Campo de Vallecas; Attendance: 9,033; Referee: Eduardo Iturralde González

28 January 2012 20	Rayo Vallecano	2–3	Athletic Bilbao	Madrid
--:-- CET	Michu 11'; Casado (yellow card) 18'; Arribas 27'; García (yellow card) 82'	Report	Pérez (yellow card) 9'; Llorente 17', 23', 68'; Susaeta (yellow card) 25'; Toquero (yellow card) 41'; Ekiza (yellow card) 85'	Stadium: Campo de Vallecas; Attendance: 12,450; Referee: José Paradas Romero

5 February 2012 21	Zaragoza	1–2	Rayo Vallecano	Zaragoza
--:-- CET	Aranda (yellow card) 17'; Postiga 33'; García (yellow card) 36'; Lanzaro (yellow card) 55'; Paredes (yellow card) 57'; Juan Carlos (yellow card) 89'; Obradović (yellow card) 90+2'	Report	Pulido (yellow card) 36'; Michu (yellow card) 40', (goal) 82'; Costa (yellow card) 57', (goal) 75'	Stadium: La Romareda; Attendance: 18,000; Referee: Xavier Estrada Fernández

12 February 2012 22	Rayo Vallecano	2–0	Getafe	Madrid
--:-- CET	Michu (yellow card) 7', (goal) 34'; Pulido (yellow card) 21'; Costa (yellow card) 27', (goal) 64'; Arribas (yellow card) 86'; Casado (yellow card) 87'	Report	Lopo (yellow card) 28'; Mané (yellow card) 36'; Güiza (yellow card) 49'; Míchel (red card) 61'	Stadium: Campo de Vallecas; Attendance: 10,000; Referee: Alfonso Álvarez Izquierdo

19 February 2012 23	Levante	3–5	Rayo Vallecano	Ciutat de València
--:-- CET	Farinós (yellow card) 41'; Koné (yellow card) 41'; Barkero 50' (pen.); Del Horno (yellow card) 65'; Suárez 79', 90+2' (pen.); Cabral (yellow card) 83'; Torres (yellow card) 83'	Report	Tito (yellow card) 11'; Bangoura (yellow card) 28', (goal) 35', 70'; Pulido (yellow card) 49'; Costa 62', 63', (yellow card) 67'; Delibašić 85'	Stadium: Valencia; Attendance: 9,457; Referee: Eduardo Iturralde González

26 February 2012 24	Rayo Vallecano	0–1	Real Madrid	Madrid
--:-- CET	Costa (yellow card) 20'; Fuego (yellow card) 84'; Michu (red card) 89'; Arribas (yellow card) 90+2'	Report	Ramos (yellow card) 4'; Casillas (yellow card) 42'; Marcelo (yellow card) 45'; Ronaldo 54'; Alonso (yellow card) 65'; Coentrão (yellow card) 90'; Pepe (yellow card) 90+3'	Stadium: Campo de Vallecas; Attendance: 13,500; Referee: David Fernández Borbalán

3 March 2012 25	Rayo Vallecano	4–2	Racing Santander	Madrid
--:-- CET	Armenteros (yellow card) 40'; Costa (yellow card) 42'; Michu 45', 64'; Fuego (yellow card) 53'; Tamudo (yellow card) 54', (goal) 67'; Piti 72'	Report	Toño (red card) 3'; Torrejón 9'; Colsa 28'; Álvaro (yellow card) 71'; Diop (yellow card) 86'; Espinosa (yellow card) 90+1'	Stadium: Campo de Vallecas; Attendance: 11,000; Referee: Pedro Pérez Montero

11 March 2012 26	Espanyol	5–1	Rayo Vallecano	Cornellà de Llobregat
--:-- CET	Uche 4', 45', 68'; Coutinho 10', 23'; López (yellow card) 35'; Baena (yellow card) 61'; Amat (yellow card) 67'; Verdú (yellow card) 73'	Report	Tamudo 54'; Michu (yellow card) 57'; Bangoura (yellow card) 76'	Stadium: Cornellà-El Prat; Attendance: 18,000; Referee: Fernando Teixeira Vitienes

17 March 2012 27	Rayo Vallecano	3–0	Betis	Madrid
--:-- CET	Casado (yellow card) 12'; Fuego (yellow card) 36'; Armenteros 51'; Costa 78'; Tamudo 90+1'	Report	Nacho (yellow card) 18'; Pereira (yellow card) 83'	Stadium: Campo de Vallecas; Attendance: 14,500; Referee: Alberto Undiano Mallenco

22 March 2012 28	Málaga	4–2	Rayo Vallecano	Málaga
--:-- CET	Gámez (yellow card) 4'; Rondón 35', 58'; Maresca 70', (yellow card) 70'; Caballero (yellow card) 84'; Duda 86'	Report	Costa 5' (pen.), (yellow card) 21'; Arribas (yellow card) 11'; Tito (yellow card) 31'; Casado (yellow card) 34'; Trashorras 84' (pen.)	Stadium: La Rosaleda; Attendance: 22,000; Referee: Antonio Mateu Lahoz

25 March 2012 29	Rayo Vallecano	0–2	Villarreal	Madrid
--:-- CET	Casado (yellow card) 4'; Arribas (yellow card) 54'; Tito (yellow card) 60'	Report	Ruben 29'; Bruno (yellow card) 63'; Ángel 85'	Stadium: Campo de Vallecas; Attendance: 10,000; Referee: Miguel Pérez Lasa

1 April 2012 30	Real Sociedad	4–0	Rayo Vallecano	San Sebastián
--:-- CET	Agirretxe 6'; Zurutuza 31'; Griezmann 51'; Vela 53'; Ansotegi (yellow card) 69'	Report	Diamanka (yellow card) 13'; Costa (yellow card) 65'; Casado (yellow card) 75'	Stadium: Anoeta; Attendance: 20,000; Referee: Pedro Pérez Montero

7 April 2012 31	Rayo Vallecano	6–0	Osasuna	Madrid
--:-- CET	Movilla 5'; Michu 17', 28'; Piti (yellow card) 28'; Costa 36'; Pulido (yellow card) 52'; Armenteros 57'; Tito 79'	Report	Raitala (yellow card) 43'; Timor (yellow card) 65'; Flaño (yellow card) 69'; Rovérsio (yellow card) 81'	Stadium: Campo de Vallecas; Attendance: 14,000; Referee: Xavier Estrada Fernández

11 April 2012 32	Valencia	4–1	Rayo Vallecano	Valencia
--:-- CET	R. Costa (yellow card) 25'; Jonas 41', 77' (pen.); Alba (yellow card) 67', (goal) 70'; Hernández 88'	Report	Bangoura (yellow card) 37'; Pulido (yellow card) 62'; D. Costa (yellow card) 66', (goal) 72'; Movilla (yellow card) 73'; Tamudo (yellow card) 74'; Arribas (yellow card) 76'; Michu (yellow card) 90+4'	Stadium: Mestalla; Attendance: 48,711; Referee: José Paradas Romero

15 April 2012 33	Rayo Vallecano	0–1	Atlético Madrid	Madrid
--:-- CET	Movilla (yellow card) 34'; Bangoura (yellow card) 36'; Tamudo (yellow card) 42'; Trashorras (yellow card) 48'; Arribas (yellow card) 82'; Tito (yellow card) 90+3'	Report	Miranda (yellow card) 46'; Falcao 65'; Adrián (yellow card) 80'	Stadium: Campo de Vallecas; Attendance: 10,000; Referee: Antonio Mateu Lahoz

21 April 2012 34	Sporting Gijón	2–1	Rayo Vallecano	Gijón
--:-- CET	Sangoy 18'; Ayoze (yellow card) 33'; Arnolin (yellow card) 48'; Bilić (yellow card) 65', (goal) 78'; Suárez (yellow card) 86'	Report	Casado (yellow card) 21' (yellow-red card) 87'; Labaka 51', (red card) 76'; Pulido (yellow card) 68'; Trashorras (yellow card) 76'	Stadium: El Molinón; Attendance: 21,000; Referee: Ignacio Iglesias Villanueva

29 April 2012 35	Rayo Vallecano	0–7	Barcelona	Madrid
--:-- CET	Correa (yellow card) 21'; Tito (yellow card) 35'; Arribas (yellow card) 45+2'; Michu (yellow card) 90+2'	Report	Messi 16', 90'; Keita 39'; Pedro 47', 87', (yellow card) 52'; Thiago 77'	Stadium: Campo de Vallecas; Attendance: 10,000; Referee: Carlos Delgado Ferreiro

2 May 2012 36	Mallorca	1–0	Rayo Vallecano	Palma
--:-- CET	Flores (yellow card) 44'; Castro 62'; Ramis (yellow card) 67'	Report	Casado (yellow card) 8'; Pulido (yellow card) 63'; Arribas (yellow card) 77'; Bangoura (yellow card) 90+2'	Stadium: Iberostar; Attendance: 13,000; Referee: Miguel Ayza Gámez

5 May 2012 37	Sevilla	5–2	Rayo Vallecano	Seville
--:-- CET	Diawara 31', 47'; Cala 43', (yellow card) 53'; Reyes 65'; Kanouté 81', (yellow card) 82'; Guarente (yellow card) 88'	Report	Delibašić (yellow card) 17'; Pulido (yellow card) 17'; Costa (yellow card) 26', (goal) 37' (pen.), 77'; Cobeño (yellow card) 45'; Trashorras (yellow card) 82'	Stadium: Ramón Sánchez Pizjuán; Attendance: 28,000; Referee: Javier Turienzo Álvarez

13 May 2012 38	Rayo Vallecano	1–0	Granada	Madrid
--:-- CET	Casado (yellow card) 19'; Piti (yellow card) 85'; Tamudo 90+1', (yellow card) 90+2'	Report	López (yellow card) 31'; B. Gómez (yellow card) 57'; Júlio César (yellow card) 72'; Cortés (yellow card) 89'	Stadium: Campo de Vallecas; Attendance: 10,000; Referee: Alberto Undiano Mallenco

== See also ==
- 2011–12 Copa del Rey
- 2011–12 La Liga
