= Julián Luque =

Spanish footballer

Personal information
- Full name: Julián Luque Conde
- Date of birth: 27 March 1992 (age 34)
- Place of birth: Torrelavega, Spain
- Height: 1.75 m (5 ft 9 in)
- Position: Winger

Youth career
- Racing Santander

Senior career*
Years	Team	Apps	(Gls)
2009–2012	Racing B	34	(2)
2011–2013	Racing Santander	30	(0)
2013–2014	SønderjyskE	7	(1)
2014–2015	Espanyol B	40	(2)
2015	Espanyol	1	(0)
2015–2019	Guijuelo	139	(13)
2019–2021	Cultural Leonesa	42	(6)
2021–2022	Zamora	32	(3)
2022–2023	Real Unión	26	(1)

International career
2008	Spain U16	2	(1)
2009	Spain U17	1	(0)
2010	Spain U18	2	(0)
- * Club domestic league appearances and goals

Julián Luque Conde (born 27 March 1992) is a Spanish former footballer who played mainly as a winger.

== Club career ==
Born in Torrelavega, Cantabria, Luque was a product of local giants Racing de Santander's youth system. He made his senior debut at only 17, appearing in 20 games with the reserves (one goal) in an eventual relegation from Segunda División B.

On 22 January 2011, Luque made his first-team – and La Liga – debut, playing 20 minutes in a 0–3 away loss against eventual champions FC Barcelona. On 15 May, as the team was already safe from relegation, he received his first start, featuring the full 90 minutes in another away fixture, a 2–1 defeat to Sporting de Gijón.

On 2 September 2013, after another relegation with Racing, Luque signed with Danish Superliga club SønderjyskE Fodbold, going on to become the first Spaniard to score in that competition. He returned to his country in the following transfer window, joining RCD Espanyol's reserve team.

Luque continued to compete in the Spanish third level in the following seasons, with CD Guijuelo and Cultural y Deportiva Leonesa.

== International career ==
In early 2009, Luque began being called for the Spain under-17 side.

== Career statistics ==
=== Club ===
As of match played 14 march 2021

Appearances and goals by club, season and competition
Club	Season	League			National Cup		Other		Total	
Club	Season	Division	Apps	Goals	Apps	Goals	Apps	Goals	Apps	Goals
Racing Santander	2010–11	La Liga	7	0	0	0	—		7	0
Racing Santander	2011–12	La Liga	15	0	2	0	—		17	0
Racing Santander	2012–13	Segunda División	7	0	0	0	—		7	0
Racing Santander	2013–14	Segunda División B	1	0	0	0	—		1	0
Racing Santander	Total		30	0	2	0	0	0	32	0
SønderjyskE	2013–14	Danish Superliga	7	1	0	0	—		7	1
Espanyol B	2013–14	Segunda División B	7	0	—		—		7	0
Espanyol B	2014–15	Segunda División B	33	2	—		—		33	2
Espanyol B	Total		40	2	0	0	0	0	40	2
Espanyol	2014–15	La Liga	1	0	1	0	—		2	0
Guijuelo	2015–16	Segunda División B	34	1	2	0	—		36	1
Guijuelo	2016–17	Segunda División B	35	4	3	0	—		38	4
Guijuelo	2017–18	Segunda División B	34	2	—		—		34	2
Guijuelo	2018–19	Segunda División B	36	6	—		—		36	6
Guijuelo	Total		139	13	5	0	0	0	144	13
Cultural Leonesa	2019–20	Segunda División B	21	3	4	0	1 (Note: Appearance(s) in Promotion Playoffs)	0	25	3
Cultural Leonesa	2020–21	Segunda División B	15	1	2	0	—		17	1
Cultural Leonesa	Total		36	4	6	0	1	0	43	4
Career total			253	20	14	0	1	0	268	20
