= Jairo Morillas =

Spanish footballer

Personal information
- Full name: Jairo Morillas Rivero
- Date of birth: 2 July 1993 (age 33)
- Place of birth: Gilena, Spain
- Height: 1.84 m (6 ft 1/2 in)
- Position: Forward

Team information
- Current team: L'Hospitalet

Youth career
- Sevilla

Senior career*
| Years | Team | Apps | (Gls) |
| 2009–2010 | Sevilla C | 26 | (6) |
| 2010–2013 | Sevilla B | 38 | (7) |
| 2013–2015 | Espanyol B | 60 | (26) |
| 2014–2018 | Espanyol | 3 | (0) |
| 2015–2016 | → Girona (loan) | 24 | (6) |
| 2016–2017 | → Numancia (loan) | 18 | (2) |
| 2018–2019 | V-Varen Nagasaki | 2 | (0) |
| 2019–2020 | Badajoz | 10 | (1) |
| 2020–2021 | Ebro | 19 | (3) |
| 2021–2022 | CF Salamanca | 14 | (1) |
| 2022 | Cornellà | 13 | (2) |
| 2022–2023 | Hibernians | 14 | (0) |
| 2023–2024 | Puente Genil | 24 | (12) |
| 2024–2025 | Ciudad de Lucena | 27 | (4) |
| 2025– | L'Hospitalet | 4 | (0) |

International career
| 2011 | Spain U18 | 2 | (1) |
- * Club domestic league appearances and goals as of 12 October 2025

Jairo Morillas Rivero (born 2 July 1993) is a Spanish footballer who plays for Tercera Federación club L'Hospitalet as a striker.

== Club career ==
Born in Gilena, Seville, Andalusia, Morillas graduated from Sevilla FC's youth setup, and made his debuts as a senior with the C-team in the 2009–10 campaign in Tercera División, aged only 16. He was promoted to the reserves in 2010, spending several seasons in Segunda División B.

On 3 July 2013 Morillas signed a two-year deal with RCD Espanyol, being assigned to the B-side also in the third level. He made his first-team – and La Liga – debut on 31 August of the following year, replacing Paco Montañés in the 79th minute of a 1–2 home loss against his former side Sevilla.

Morillas scored his first professional goal on 17 December, netting the game's winner in a home success against Deportivo Alavés, for the season's Copa del Rey. On 8 July 2015 he signed a new three-year deal with the Pericos, until 2018, and was loaned to Girona FC in Segunda División late in the month.

On 6 July 2016, Jairo was loaned to CD Numancia also in the second level, for one year. In April of the following year, he suffered an injury in the Achilles tendon, being sidelined for nearly a year.

On 15 July 2018, Morillas signed with J1 League side V-Varen Nagasaki as a free agent after leaving Espanyol.

On 30 January 2020, Morillas was announced at CD Ebro.

On 29 January 2022, Morillas was announced at Cornellà.

On 17 August 2022, Morillas was announced at Hibernians FC.
