= Jeison Murillo =

Colombian footballer (born 1992)

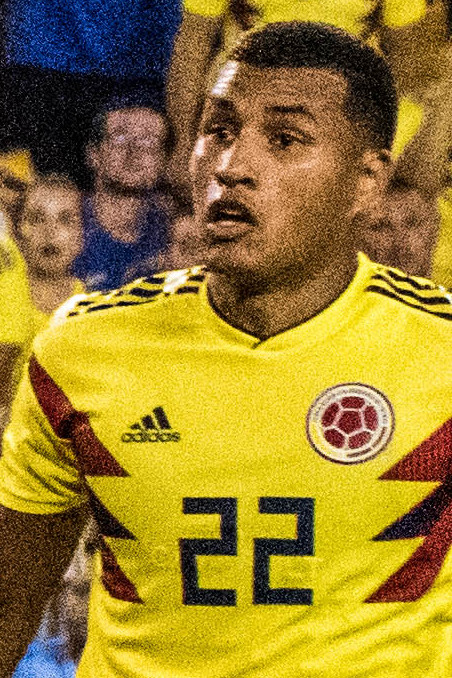
- Murillo with Colombia in 2017

Personal information
- Full name: Jeison Fabián Murillo Cerón
- Date of birth: 27 May 1992 (age 34)
- Place of birth: Cali, Colombia
- Height: 1.82 m (6 ft 0 in)
- Position: Centre-back

Team information
- Current team: Al-Shamal
- Number: 24

Youth career
- 2009–2010: Deportivo Cali

Senior career*
Years	Team	Apps	(Gls)
2010–2011	Udinese	0	(0)
2010–2011	→ Granada B (loan)	22	(2)
2011–2015	Granada	51	(1)
2011–2012	→ Cádiz (loan)	27	(3)
2012–2013	→ Las Palmas (loan)	37	(3)
2015–2018	Inter Milan	61	(2)
2017–2018	→ Valencia (loan)	17	(0)
2018–2020	Valencia	1	(0)
2019	→ Barcelona (loan)	2	(0)
2019	→ Sampdoria (loan)	10	(0)
2020–2023	Sampdoria	20	(0)
2020–2021	→ Celta (loan)	49	(3)
2021–2022	→ Celta (loan)	19	(0)
2023–	Al-Shamal	61	(1)

International career
2009	Colombia U17	6	(1)
2011	Colombia U20	4	(0)
2014–2020	Colombia	32	(1)
Medal record
Colombia
Copa América Centenario
Bronze medal – third place	2016 United States
- * Club domestic league appearances and goals as of 04:19, 7 November 2026 (UTC)

Jeison Fabián Murillo Cerón (born 27 May 1992) is a Colombian professional footballer who plays as a central defender for Qatar Stars League club Al-Shamal.

== Club career ==
=== Early years and Granada ===
Born in Cali, Murillo signed with Udinese Calcio in Italy shortly after his 18th birthday, being immediately loaned to Granada CF as part of the partnership agreement between both clubs. He spent his first year in Spain with the reserves, in the regional leagues.

In early February 2012, Murillo was definitely bought by the Andalusians, but spent the following seasons on loan to clubs also in the country, Cádiz CF and UD Las Palmas. He scored four official goals in his first year as a professional, including a brace on 9 March 2013 in a 3–2 away win against UD Almería in the Segunda División. He appeared in the promotion playoffs with both teams, being unsuccessful on both occasions.

Murillo returned to Granada in the middle of 2013, making his La Liga debut on 18 August 2013 in a 2–1 win at CA Osasuna (90 minutes played). He netted his first goal in the competition on 10 January of the following year, the first in a 4–0 home victory over Real Valladolid.

=== Inter Milan ===
In February 2015, Murillo joined Inter Milan on a five-year contract, with the transfer being made effective in July and costing a reported €8 million plus €2 million in bonuses, and earning the player €1 million per year. He made his Serie A debut on 23 August, playing the entire 1–0 home win against Atalanta BC.

=== Valencia ===
On 18 August 2017, Murillo returned to Spain by joining Valencia CF on a two-year loan with an obligation to buy. He contributed 17 matches in his first season, which ended in qualification for the group stage of the UEFA Champions League after a fourth-place finish.

On 20 December 2018, Murillo joined FC Barcelona on a loan deal until the end of the campaign with a purchase option worth €25 million. His first competitive appearance took place three weeks later, in a 2–1 away loss to Levante UD in the Copa del Rey's round of 16 where he played 90 minutes and was booked. He also started in the second leg, a 3–0 win at the Camp Nou.

=== Sampdoria ===
On 13 July 2019, still owned by Valencia, Murillo signed with UC Sampdoria for an initial loan fee of €2 million and an obligation to buy for €13 million at the end of the season. On 15 January 2020, the Italian club bought out his rights and loaned him to RC Celta de Vigo until 30 June, with an option to purchase.

Murillo agreed to another loan at the Balaídos on 16 September 2020. On 31 August of the following year, a similar move was arranged.

=== Later career ===
On 28 July 2023, Murillo signed a two-year contract with Al-Shamal SC of the Qatar Stars League. In February 2025, he agreed to an extension until June 2026.

== International career ==
Murillo made his debut for Colombia on 10 October 2014, playing 30 minutes in a 3–0 friendly win over El Salvador. He was included in the squad for the 2015 Copa América, scoring the only goal in the second group stage game against Brazil. During the quarter-final match against eventual finalists Argentina, he put on a strong performance in the 0–0 draw, but was one of three Colombian players to miss his penalty shootout attempt; he was subsequently named "Best Young Player" of the tournament.

== Career statistics ==
=== Club ===
As of 25 February 2026

Club	Season	League			National cup		Continental		Other		Total	
Club	Season	Division	Apps	Goals	Apps	Goals	Apps	Goals	Apps	Goals	Apps	Goals
Granada	2013–14	La Liga	32	1	2	0	—		—		34	1
Granada	2014–15	La Liga	19	0	0	0	—		—		19	0
Granada	Total		51	1	2	0	—		—		53	1
Cádiz (loan)	2011–12	Segunda División B	27	3	2	0	—		—		29	3
Cádiz (loan)	Total		27	3	2	0	—		—		29	3
Las Palmas (loan)	2012–13	Segunda División	37	3	4	0	—		—		41	3
Las Palmas (loan)	Total		37	3	4	0	—		—		41	3
Inter Milan	2015–16	Serie A	34	2	1	0	—		—		35	2
Inter Milan	2016–17	Serie A	27	0	2	1	5 (Note: Appearances in UEFA Europa League)	0	—		34	1
Inter Milan	Total		61	2	3	1	5	0	—		69	3
Valencia (loan)	2017–18	La Liga	17	0	0	0	—		—		17	0
Valencia	2018–19	La Liga	1	0	1	0	1 (Note: Appearance in UEFA Champions League)	0	—		3	0
Valencia	Total		18	0	1	0	1	0	—		20	0
Barcelona (loan)	2018–19	La Liga	2	0	2	0	0	0	—		4	0
Sampdoria (loan)	2019–20	Serie A	10	0	2	0	0	0	—		12	0
Celta (loan)	2019–20	La Liga	18	1	0	0	—		—		18	1
Celta (loan)	2020–21	La Liga	31	2	1	0	—		—		32	2
Celta (loan)	2021–22	La Liga	19	0	3	0	—		—		22	0
Celta (loan)	Total		68	3	4	0	—		—		72	3
Sampdoria	2021–22	Serie A	0	0	1	0	—		—		1	0
Sampdoria	2022–23	Serie A	20	0	2	0	—		—		22	0
Sampdoria	Total		20	0	3	0	—		—		23	0
Al-Shamal SC	2023–24	Qatar Stars League	19	0	1	0	—		2 (Note: Appearances in Amir of Qatar Cup)	0	22	0
Al-Shamal SC	2024–25	Qatar Stars League	19	0	2	0	—		2	0	23	0
Al-Shamal SC	2025–26	Qatar Stars League	13	0	1	0	—		1	0	15	0
Al-Shamal SC	Total		51	0	5	0	—		5	0	61	0
Career total			345	11	27	1	6	0	5	0	383	12

=== International ===
Colombia
Year	Apps	Goals
2014	4	0
2015	11	1
2016	10	0
2017	0	0
2018	2	0
2019	2	0
2020	3	0
Total	32	1

Scores and results list Colombia's goal tally first, score column indicates score after each Murillo goal.

#	Date	Venue	Opponent	Score	Final	Competition
1.	17 June 2015	Monumental David Arellano, Santiago, Chile	Brazil	1–0	1–0	2015 Copa América

== Honours ==
Barcelona

- La Liga: 2018–19

Valencia

- Copa del Rey: 2018–19

Colombia U20

- Toulon Tournament: 2011

Colombia

- Copa América third place: 2016

Individual

- Copa América Best Young Player: 2015
- Copa América Team of the Tournament: 2015
