= Felipe Mattioni =

Brazilian footballer (born 1988)

Personal information
- Full name: Felipe Mattioni Rohde
- Date of birth: 15 October 1988 (age 38)
- Place of birth: Ijuí, Brazil
- Height: 1.78 m (5 ft 10 in)
- Position: Right-back

Youth career
- 2004–2007: Grêmio

Senior career*
Years	Team	Apps	(Gls)
2007–2010	Grêmio	13	(0)
2009	→ Milan (loan)	1	(0)
2009–2010	→ Mallorca (loan)	20	(1)
2010–2015	Espanyol	13	(0)
2015–2016	Everton	0	(0)
2015–2016	→ Doncaster Rovers (loan)	5	(0)
2017	Boa Esporte	3	(0)
2018	Veranópolis	10	(2)
2018	Juventude	22	(1)
2019	Coritiba	13	(0)
2020	Novo Hamburgo	4	(0)
2020	São José-RS	3	(0)
2021	Novo Hamburgo	2	(0)
- * Club domestic league appearances and goals as of 11:02, 9 March 2022 (UTC)

Felipe Mattioni Rohde (born 15 October 1988), known as Mattioni, is a Brazilian professional footballer who plays as a right-back.

He also holds Italian citizenship, and spent most of his career with Espanyol, being hindered by several injuries.

== Career ==
=== Grêmio ===
Born in Ijuí, Rio Grande do Sul, of Italian and German descent. Mattioni joined Grêmio Foot-Ball Porto Alegrense in 2004, being promoted to the main squad three years later but failing to appear in the Série A in his first season. However, after performing well in the Campeonato Brasileiro Sub-20 and appearing in the Campeonato Gaúcho, he made his debut in the top division in a 2–0 home win against Clube Náutico Capibaribe.

On 15 January 2009, A.C. Milan in Italy acquired Mattioni on loan, with the Rossoneri having an option to buy the player at the end of the campaign. He played his first match in a 2–2 friendly draw to Rangers, but failed to make an impact due to leg injuries, his Serie A input consisting of two minutes in a 2–0 away victory over Calcio Catania on 3 May.

In June 2009, Milan announced the club would not exercise the buying option on Mattioni. On 26 August, RCD Mallorca signed him also on loan, from Associação Maga Esporte Clube company, with a pre-set price of about €2 million. During the season he battled for first-choice status with Josemi, scoring from 40 meters in a 4–1 home win against Atlético Madrid as the Balearic Islands team eventually finished fifth and qualified to the UEFA Europa League (later revoked).

=== Espanyol ===
In May 2010, Mallorca decided to sign Mattioni permanently for €2 million subject to the decision of the administrator of the club, which was undergoing severe financial difficulties. Finally the deal fell through, and he joined fellow La Liga side RCD Espanyol from Maga.

Early into his spell in Catalonia, Mattioni sustained a severe knee injury – left anterior cruciate ligament – going on to miss the entire 2010–11 campaign. Shortly after recovering he suffered the same injury in his right leg, being initially ruled out for another six months and eventually nearly two years.

Mattioni finally returned to action on 1 November 2012, appearing as a late substitute in a 1–3 away loss against Sevilla FC for the round of 32 in the Copa del Rey. His first league appearance came on 2 February of the following year, as he started and played the full 90 minutes in a 3–2 home defeat of Levante UD.

=== Everton ===
On 29 September 2015, Mattioni featured for Premier League club Everton's under-21 side, playing in a 3–1 win over Norwich City. A month later, he signed a contract until the end of the season but was immediately loaned out to Doncaster Rovers of League One. He made his debut for the latter on 7 November in the first round of the FA Cup, featuring the full 90 minutes of a 2–0 win over semi-professional Stalybridge Celtic at the Keepmoat Stadium.

=== Back to Brazil ===
On 7 February 2017, Boa Esporte Clube announced the signing of Mattioni until the end of the season. He was injured in his third Série B match, and did not regain his place in the team.

Mattioni joined Veranópolis Esporte Clube Recreativo e Cultural in October 2017, ahead of the upcoming edition of the Campeonato Gaúcho. The following April he agreed to a deal at Esporte Clube Juventude of the second division, scoring in a 1–1 away draw against Grêmio Esportivo Brasil as the campaign ended in relegation.

In December 2018, free agent Mattioni moved to Coritiba Foot Ball Club.
