= Piti (footballer) =

Spanish footballer

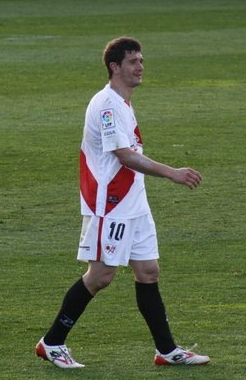
- Piti with Rayo Vallecano in 2011

Personal information
- Full name: Francisco Medina Luna
- Date of birth: 26 May 1981 (age 45)
- Place of birth: Reus, Spain
- Height: 1.74 m (5 ft 9 in)
- Positions: Winger; forward

Team information
- Current team: Lamia (technical director)

Youth career
- Atlético Segre

Senior career*
Years	Team	Apps	(Gls)
2001–2002	Novelda	17	(0)
2002–2003	Tàrrega		
2003–2004	Reus	36	(22)
2004–2005	Zaragoza B	27	(11)
2005–2006	Zaragoza	3	(0)
2005–2006	→ Ciudad Murcia (loan)	30	(8)
2006–2007	Hércules	21	(2)
2007	→ Rayo Vallecano (loan)	4	(0)
2007–2013	Rayo Vallecano	197	(52)
2013–2016	Granada	67	(8)
2016	Rayo Vallecano	15	(0)
2017	AEL Limassol	17	(5)
2017–2018	Lamia	27	(5)
2018–2019	AEL	15	(0)
2019	Lamia	10	(2)
2019–2020	Jamshedpur	6	(1)
2020	Atlético Pinto	4	(0)
2021	Lamia	9	(0)
Total		505	(116)

International career
2003–2015	Catalonia	6	(1)
- * Club domestic league appearances and goals

Francisco Medina Luna (born 26 May 1981), known as Piti, is a Spanish former professional footballer who played as a winger or a forward.

His name was mostly associated with Rayo Vallecano where he had three spells, and achieved La Liga totals of 148 games and 29 goals for that club, Zaragoza and Granada. He amassed 164 appearances and 34 goals in the Segunda División for Ciudad de Murcia, Hércules and Rayo, and spent several years of his later career in Cyprus, Greece and India.

== Club career ==
Born in Reus, Tarragona, Catalonia, Piti was signed by Real Zaragoza in 2004 after playing almost exclusively in amateur football, notably scoring 22 goals for CF Reus Deportiu in the Tercera División. During his spell in Aragon, however, he was mainly registered with the reserves – he appeared in three La Liga games, totalling 34 minutes– also being loaned to Ciudad de Murcia of Segunda División for the 2005–06 season.

Piti joined second-division club Hércules CF in the summer of 2006 but, in January of the following year, he moved to Rayo Vallecano of Segunda División B on loan. After featuring rarely for the Valencians in the first half of the 2007–08 campaign, he returned to Rayo and helped the Madrid outskirts team to return to division two, scoring seven times in 21 matches.

In the following second-tier seasons, Piti remained an important attacking player for Rayo Vallecano. In 2010–11 he contributed nine goals (second-best in the squad, tied with Óscar Trejo) as the side returned to the top flight after an eight-year absence.

Piti came of age in 2012–13 at the age of 31, scoring 18 goals from 35 appearances, only five through penalties as Rayo posted their best season in the top division. Highlights included braces at Málaga CF (2–1) and Levante UD (3–2 win), and at home against Getafe CF (3–1).

In the following years, Piti represented Granada CF and (again) Rayo, always in the main tier. On 3 January 2017 the 35-year-old moved abroad for the first time in his career, joining Cypriot First Division club AEL Limassol until 30 June.

On 29 July 2017, PAS Lamia 1964 announced the signing of Piti. On 16 July 2018 he joined Athlitiki Enosi Larissa F.C. also of the Super League Greece for an undisclosed fee but, six months later, returned to his previous team.

In October 2020, following a short spell in the Indian Super League with Jamshedpur FC, Piti returned to his homeland to act as player and part-owner of amateurs CA Pinto. He worked as Lamia's technical director after retiring, leaving the position on 21 February 2022.

Piti returned to Lamia in January 2023, in the same capacity.

== International career ==
Uncapped by Spain at any level, Piti represented the non-FIFA Catalonia side. On 24 May 2006, he scored in a 2–0 win against Costa Rica in Terrassa as the opponents prepared for the upcoming World Cup.

== Career statistics ==
As of match played on 6 May 2019

Club	Season	League			National cup (Note: Includes Copa del Rey, Cypriot Cup, Greek Football Cup)		Other		Total	
Club	Season	Division	Apps	Goals	Apps	Goals	Apps	Goals	Apps	Goals
Zaragoza B	2004–05	Segunda División B	27	11	—		—		27	11
Zaragoza	2004–05	La Liga	3	0	0	0	—		3	0
Ciudad Murcia (loan)	2005–06	Segunda División	30	8	1	0	—		31	8
Hércules	2006–07	Segunda División	15	2	3	2	—		18	4
Hércules	2007–08	Segunda División	6	0	2	1	—		8	1
Hércules	Total		21	2	5	3	0	0	26	5
Rayo Vallecano (loan)	2006–07	Segunda División B	4	0	0	0	3 (Note: Appearances in Segunda División B play-offs)	3	7	3
Rayo Vallecano	2007–08	Segunda División B	21	7	0	0	4	0	25	7
Rayo Vallecano	2008–09	Segunda División	37	8	2	1	—		39	9
Rayo Vallecano	2009–10	Segunda División	35	7	6	1	—		41	8
Rayo Vallecano	2010–11	Segunda División	34	9	0	0	—		34	9
Rayo Vallecano	2011–12	La Liga	35	3	1	0	—		36	3
Rayo Vallecano	2012–13	La Liga	35	18	0	0	—		35	18
Rayo Vallecano	Total		201	52	9	2	7	3	217	57
Granada	2013–14	La Liga	26	5	2	0	—		28	5
Granada	2014–15	La Liga	33	1	0	0	—		33	1
Granada	2015–16	La Liga	7	2	0	0	—		7	2
Granada	Total		66	8	2	0	0	0	68	8
Rayo Vallecano	2015–16	La Liga	8	0	—		—		8	0
Rayo Vallecano	2016–17	Segunda División	7	0	1	0	—		8	0
Rayo Vallecano	Total		15	0	1	0	0	0	16	0
AEL Limassol	2016–17	Cypriot First Division	17	5	3	1	—		20	6
AEL Limassol	Total		17	5	3	1	0	0	20	6
Lamia	2017–18	Super League Greece	27	5	3	2	—		30	7
Lamia	2018–19	Super League Greece	10	2	3	0	—		13	2
Lamia	Total		37	7	6	2	0	0	43	9
AEL	2018–19	Super League Greece	15	0	2	0	—		17	0
Career total			436	93	28	8	7	3	471	104
