= Francisco Montañés =

Spanish footballer

Paco Montañés
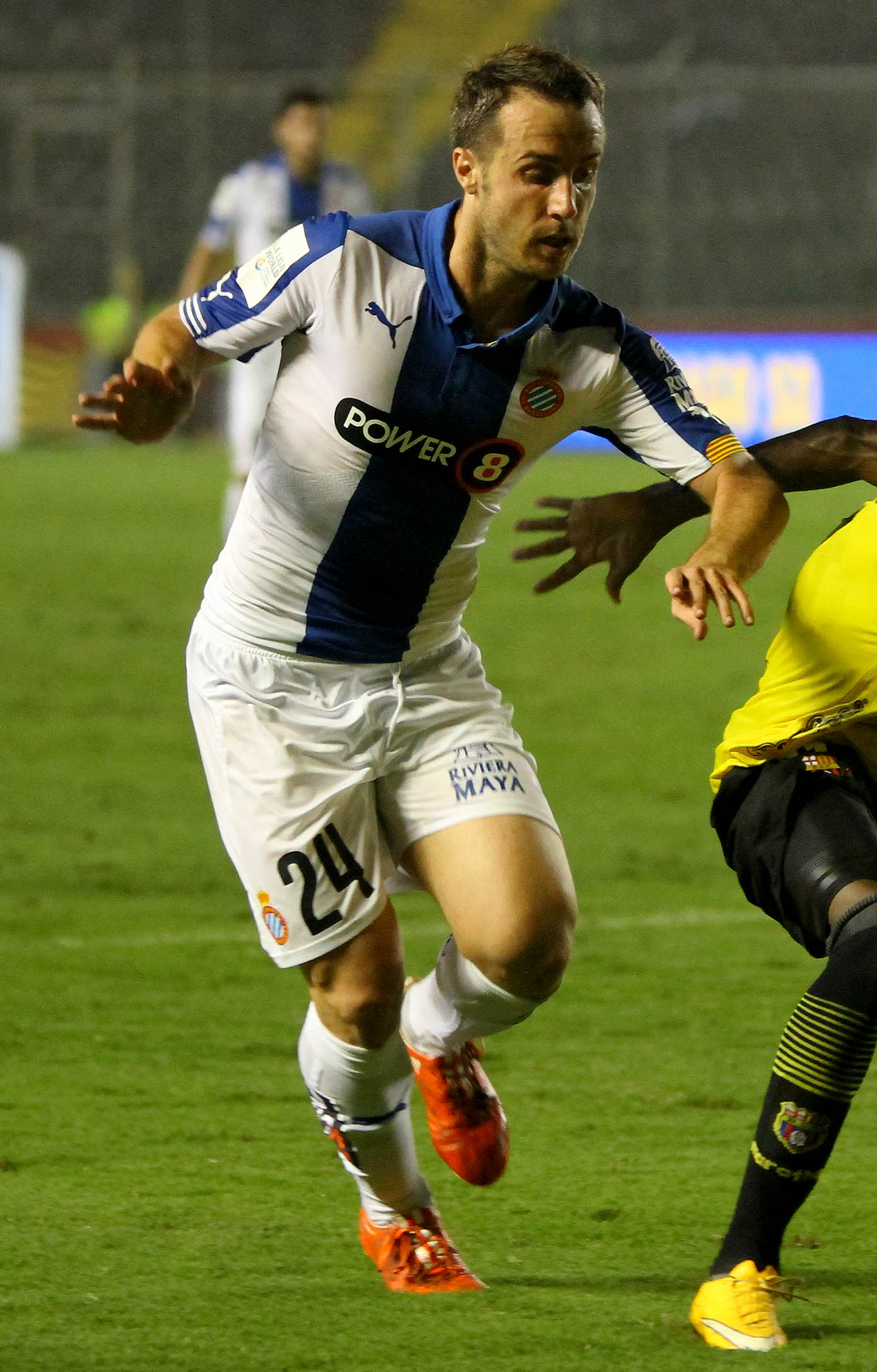
- Montañés playing for Espanyol in 2015

Personal information
- Full name: Francisco Montañés Claverías
- Date of birth: 8 October 1986 (age 40)
- Place of birth: Castellón, Spain
- Height: 1.72 m (5 ft 7 1/2 in)
- Position: Winger

Youth career
- Castellón
- 1998–2004: Barcelona

Senior career*
Years	Team	Apps	(Gls)
2004–2006	Barcelona C	22	(6)
2004–2006	Barcelona B	47	(0)
2006	Barcelona	1	(0)
2006–2009	Villarreal B	44	(4)
2009–2010	Ontinyent	21	(0)
2010–2012	Alcorcón	75	(16)
2012–2014	Zaragoza	74	(9)
2014–2017	Espanyol	32	(1)
2016–2017	→ Levante (loan)	22	(1)
2017–2019	Tenerife	35	(0)
Total		373	(37)

International career
2001	Spain U16	3	(0)
2005	Spain U19	3	(0)
2006	Spain U21	2	(0)
2005	Spain U23	4	(1)
- * Club domestic league appearances and goals

Francisco 'Paco' Montañés Claverías (born 8 October 1986) is a Spanish former professional footballer who played as a right winger.

== Club career ==
Born in Castellón de la Plana, Castellón, Valencian Community, Montañés started his senior career in the reserve teams of FC Barcelona. He made his debut for the first team on 13 May 2006, playing the last 20 minutes of a 3–2 away loss against Sevilla FC. He then moved to the lower leagues, with Villarreal CF B and Ontinyent CF.

In August 2010, Montañés joined AD Alcorcón, promoted for the first time to the Segunda División. He rarely missed a game during his two-year spell as the club always retained its league status, and scored nine goals in his second season.

Montañés returned to La Liga with Real Zaragoza, signing a four-year contract on 3 July 2012. He made his official debut on 20 August, featuring the entire 0–1 home defeat to Real Valladolid.

Montañés scored his first goal in the Spanish top flight on 10 November 2012, his team's second in the 5–3 home win over Deportivo de La Coruña. He started all 38 league matches during the campaign, as the Aragonese were relegated.

On 28 July 2014, Montañés returned to the top tier after agreeing to a four-year deal with RCD Espanyol. On 12 August 2016, he was loaned to Levante UD in a season-long deal.

On 17 August 2017, free agent Montañés signed a two-year contract with second division side CD Tenerife.

== Personal life ==
In 2010, before he made his debut in the top division and thinking this was not a possibility anymore, Montañés contemplated quitting football and becoming a fireman, as his father before him. Nothing came of it eventually.

== Honours ==
Barcelona

- La Liga: 2005–06

Levante

- Segunda División: 2016–17

Spain U23

- Mediterranean Games: 2005
