= Diego Mainz =

Spanish footballer

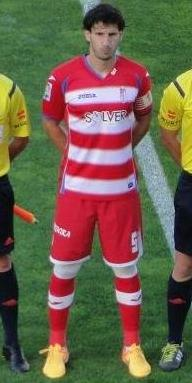
- Mainz with Granada in 2015

Personal information
- Full name: Diego Mainz García
- Date of birth: 29 December 1982 (age 43)
- Place of birth: Madrid, Spain
- Height: 1.87 m (6 ft 2 in)
- Position: Centre-back

Youth career
- 1999–2001: Rayo Vallecano

Senior career*
Years	Team	Apps	(Gls)
2001–2007	Rayo Vallecano	100	(2)
2007–2009	Albacete	58	(1)
2009	Udinese	0	(0)
2009–2016	Granada	159	(13)
Total		317	(16)

International career
2002	Spain U21	1	(0)
- * Club domestic league appearances and goals

Diego Mainz García (born 29 December 1982) is a Spanish former professional footballer who played as a central defender.

He spent most of his 15-year senior career with Rayo Vallecano and Granada, appearing in 171 competitive matches with the latter club and totalling La Liga 129 games with both.

== Club career ==
=== Rayo and Albacete ===
Born in Madrid, Mainz started his career at local Rayo Vallecano, going on to collect 36 appearances in La Liga (18 apiece from 2001 to 2003), his first being on 27 October as he played the full 90 minutes in a 2–1 home win against Deportivo de La Coruña.

In summer 2007, as the capital side had slumped to Segunda División B, he joined Albacete Balompié in the Segunda División.

=== Granada ===
After two seasons as first choice, Mainz was bought by Italy's Udinese Calcio, but was immediately transferred back to Spain with lowly Granada CF – eight other players made the same season-long move, after the two clubs' partnership agreement. With the Andalusians, he quickly established himself as an important player, helping to consecutive promotions in his first two seasons.

Mainz, who acted as captain when available, scored his first goal in the top flight on 20 March 2012, but in a 5–3 away loss to FC Barcelona. He finished the campaign with 21 appearances in 1,780 minutes, to help his team to retain their league status.

During 2014–15, Mainz netted three times in his own net. He added a further three in the other end, however, and the Nazaríes again managed to stay afloat; additionally, in a misty night on 17 December 2014, he scored at Córdoba CF to help the visitors to a 1–1 draw in the Copa del Rey and the subsequent 2–1 aggregate qualification.

== International career ==
Mainz played once with the Spain under-21 team, featuring the second half of the 3–0 friendly win over Slovenia in Ourense.
