= Fran Rico =

Spanish footballer

Personal information
- Full name: Francisco Manuel Rico Castro
- Date of birth: 3 August 1987 (age 39)
- Place of birth: Portonovo, Spain
- Height: 1.78 m (5 ft 10 in)
- Position: Midfielder

Youth career
- 1997–2001: Portonovo
- 2001–2005: Pontevedra

Senior career*
Years	Team	Apps	(Gls)
2005–2008	Pontevedra	60	(3)
2008–2011	Real Madrid B	50	(10)
2011–2019	Granada	111	(9)
2016–2018	→ Eibar (loan)	17	(2)
Total		238	(24)

Managerial career
- 2023: Sevilla (assistant)
- 2024–2026: Olympiacos (assistant)
- * Club domestic league appearances and goals

Francisco Manuel Rico Castro (born 3 August 1987) is a Spanish former professional footballer who played as a midfielder.

Brought up at Pontevedra, he spent most of his career – riddled with injury problems – at Granada, appearing in 117 competitive matches. In La Liga, he also played with Eibar.

== Club career ==
=== Pontevedra ===
Born in Portonovo, Province of Pontevedra, Rico joined local Pontevedra CF's youth ranks at the age of 14, making his senior debut on 18 December 2005 in a Segunda División B match against CD San Isidro.

Mainly a substitute in his first year, he became an important part of the Galicians' squad the following seasons.

=== Real Madrid ===
Rico joined Real Madrid in summer 2008, being assigned to the reserve team also in the third division. He made his debut on 31 August, scoring the first goal in a 2–0 win at UD Vecindario. On 14 September, in his third appearance, against CD Alfaro, he suffered an anterior cruciate ligament injury eight minutes into the match, being lost for the rest of the campaign.

Thirteen months after his injury, Rico played his first game of the season, against RSD Alcalá. On 8 November 2009, he scored twice in the 4–2 home victory over Gimnástica de Torrelavega, from penalties.

In the first round of 2010–11, Rico found the net against Coruxo FC in a 3–2 home win. He scored a career-best six goals during the campaign, including one in the unsuccessful promotion playoffs.

=== Granada ===
On 5 August 2011, Rico left Castilla and signed for Granada CF, with Real Madrid retaining an option for the player in case of a future transfer. On 25 September, he scored his first La Liga goal in only his second league game for his new team: after replacing Moisés Hurtado at half-time, he netted the equaliser in an eventual 1–1 home draw with CA Osasuna.

In April 2012, Rico was sidelined for the rest of the season after suffering another injury to his right knee. He also missed the entirety of the following campaign.

Rico was ever-present for the Andalusians in 2013–14, with his side narrowly avoiding relegation. On 26 February 2015, he renewed his contract with the club until 2020.

On 26 August 2016, Rico was loaned to fellow top-tier SD Eibar for two years. On 2 October, he scored their first-ever goal against Real Madrid and at the Santiago Bernabéu Stadium in a 1–1 draw. He missed the entire 2017–18 season due to the same ailment.

Returning to Granada for 2018–19, Rico only appeared in one league match during the campaign for the runners-up. On 16 July 2019, he terminated his contract.

After retiring, Rico worked with Eibar and Sporting de Gijón in directorial capacities. He was later part of his former Eibar coach José Luis Mendilibar's staffs at Sevilla FC and Olympiacos FC.

== Career statistics ==
Appearances and goals by club, season and competition
Club	Season	League			Cup		Europe		Other		Total	
Club	Season	Division	Apps	Goals	Apps	Goals	Apps	Goals	Apps	Goals	Apps	Goals
Pontevedra	2005–06	Segunda División B	3	1	0	0	—		—		3	1
Pontevedra	2006–07	Segunda División B	22	1	0	0	—		2 (Note: Appearances in Segunda División B play-offs)	0	24	1
Pontevedra	2007–08	Segunda División B	35	1	5	1	—		1	0	41	2
Pontevedra	Total		60	3	5	1	0	0	3	0	68	4
Real Madrid B	2008–09	Segunda División B	3	1	—		—		—		3	1
Real Madrid B	2009–10	Segunda División B	18	4	—		—		—		18	4
Real Madrid B	2010–11	Segunda División B	29	5	—		—		2	1	31	6
Real Madrid B	Total		50	10	0	0	0	0	2	1	52	11
Granada	2011–12	La Liga	19	2	1	0	—		—		20	2
Granada	2012–13	La Liga	0	0	0	0	—		—		0	0
Granada	2013–14	La Liga	32	2	1	0	—		—		33	2
Granada	2014–15	La Liga	31	3	1	0	—		—		33	2
Granada	2015–16	La Liga	28	2	3	1	—		—		31	3
Granada	2018–19	Segunda División	1	0	0	0	—		—		1	0
Granada	Total		111	9	6	1	0	0	0	0	117	10
Eibar (loan)	2016–17	La Liga	17	2	5	0	—		—		22	2
Eibar (loan)	2017–18	La Liga	0	0	0	0	—		—		0	0
Eibar (loan)	Total		17	2	5	0	0	0	0	0	22	2
Career total			238	24	16	2	0	0	5	1	259	27

== Honors ==
Pontevedra

- Segunda División B: 2006–07
- Copa Federación de España: 2006–07
