= 2011–12 Real Betis season =

Real Betis
2011–12 season
- President: Miguel Guillén
- Head coach: Pepe Mel
- Stadium: Benito Villamarín
- La Liga: 13th
- Copa del Rey: Round of 32
- Top goalscorer: League: Rubén Castro (16); All: Rubén Castro (16)
Home colours	Away colours	Third colours

The 2011–12 season Real Betis season was the club's 95th season in its history and its 47th season playing in La Liga, the top division of Spanish football, following promotion after winning the Segunda División. It covers a period from 1 July 2011 to 30 June 2012.

Real Betis competed for their second La Liga title and will enter the Copa del Rey in the round of 32. Real Betis started to win its first four games. Betis' final match of the Liga was at Málaga, a 2–0 victory.

== Current squad ==
Updated 31 August 2011 Note: Flags indicate national team as defined under FIFA eligibility rules; some limited exceptions apply. Players may hold more than one non-FIFA nationality.

No.	Pos.	Nation	Player
1	GK	ESP	Iñaki Goitia
2	DF	ESP	Isidoro
3	DF	ESP	Mario
4	DF	ESP	Antonio Amaya
5	DF	ESP	José Dorado
6	DF	SRB	Duško Tošić (on loan from Red Star Belgrade)
7	MF	ESP	Juanma
8	MF	ESP	Javier Matilla
9	FW	ESP	Jonathan Pereira
10	MF	ESP	Beñat
11	MF	ESP	Momo
13	GK	ESP	Casto
14	MF	ESP	Salva Sevilla
15	DF	ESP	Ustaritz (on loan from Athletic Bilbao)
16	FW	PAR	Roque Santa Cruz (on loan from Manchester City)
17	DF	ESP	Javier Chica

No.	Pos.	Nation	Player
18	MF	BRA	Iriney (captain)
19	FW	ESP	Jorge Molina
20	MF	ECU	Jefferson Montero (on loan from Villarreal)
21	MF	ESP	José Cañas
22	DF	POR	Nélson
23	DF	ESP	Nacho
24	FW	ESP	Rubén Castro
25	GK	ESP	Fabricio
26	DF	ESP	Miki Roqué
27	MF	ESP	Álvaro Vadillo
28	MF	ESP	Ezequiel
29	DF	ESP	Juanito
35	MF	ESP	Alejandro Pozuelo
36	DF	ESP	Álex Martínez
39	MF	ESP	Sergio

=== In ===
Number	Player	Previous Club	Cost
3	(Spain) Mario	Getafe	Free transfer
4	(Spain) Antonio Amaya	Wigan Athletic	€200,000
6	(Serbia) Duško Tošić	Red Star Belgrade	Loan
8	(Spain) Javier Matilla	Villarreal	€1,400,000
15	(Spain) Ustaritz	Athletic Bilbao	Loan
16	(Paraguay) Roque Santa Cruz	Manchester City	Loan
17	(Spain) Javier Chica	Espanyol	Free transfer
20	(Ecuador) Jefferson Montero	Villarreal	Loan
25	(Spain) Fabricio	Valladolid	Free transfer

Total expenditure: ▼€1,600,000

==== Out ====
Number	Player	Destination	Cost
–	(Spain) Chema Anton	Red Bull Salzburg	Free transfer
–	(Spain) Arzu	Gimnàstic	Mutual termination
–	(Spain) David Belenguer	Retired	Contract expiration
–	(Cameroon) Achille Emana	Al-Hilal	€4,500,000
–	(Scotland) Ryan Harper	Guadalajara	Undisclosed
–	(Spain) Fran No	Valladolid	Free
–	(Spain) Israel	Xerez	Free transfer
–	(Spain) Juande	Westerlo	Mutual termination
–	(Portugal) Miguel Lopes	Porto	Loan return
–	(Argentina) Mariano Pavone	Lanús	Free transfer
–	(Spain) Brimah Razak	Polideportivo Ejido	Loan return
–	(Spain) Rodri	Guadalajara	Mutual termination
–	(Spain) Fernando Vega	-	Mutual termination

Total income: ▲€4,500,000

== Club ==
=== Coaching staff ===
Position	Staff
Head coach	Pepe Mel
Assistant coach	Roberto Ríos
Physical trainer	David Gómez
Goalkeepers coach	José Ramón Esnaola
Head of medical services	Tomás Calero
Delegate	Víctor Antequera
Psychologist	Patricia Ramírez
Janitor	José María Montiel
Physiotherapist	José Manuel Pizarro
Kit managers	Manuel Barrera, José Manuel Acuña

Source: Realbetisbalompie.es

== Competitions ==
=== La Liga ===
==== League table ====
Pos	Team	Pld	W	D	L	GF	GA	GD	Pts
11	Getafe	38	12	11	15	40	51	−11	47 (Note: GET: 8 pts; RSO: 5 pts; BET: 2 pts)
12	Real Sociedad	38	12	11	15	46	52	−6	47
13	Real Betis	38	13	8	17	47	56	−9	47
14	Espanyol	38	12	10	16	46	56	−10	46
15	Rayo Vallecano	38	13	4	21	53	73	−20	43 (Note: RVA 0–0 ZAR; ZAR 1–2 RVA)

Source: ESPN
Rules for classification: 1st points; 2nd head-to-head points; 3rd head-to-head goal difference; 4th head-to-head goals scored; 5th goal difference; 6th number of goals scored; 7th Fair-play points

==== Results summary ====
Overall								Home						Away					
Pld	W	D	L	GF	GA	GD	Pts	W	D	L	GF	GA	GD	W	D	L	GF	GA	GD
38	13	8	17	47	56	−9	47	7	7	5	28	25	+3	6	1	12	19	31	−12

Last updated: 12 May 2012.
Source: Competitive matches

==== Results by round ====
Round	2	3	4	5	6	7	8	9	10	11	12	13	14	15	16	17	18	19	1	21	22	23	24	25	26	27	28	29	29	31	32	33	34	35	36	20	37	38
Ground	H	A	H	A	H	A	H	A	H	A	A	H	A	H	A	H	A	H	A	A	H	A	H	A	H	A	H	A	H	H	A	H	A	H	A	H	A	H
Result	D	W	W	W	W	L	L	L	L	L	L	D	L	L	L	W	W	W	L	W	L	L	W	W	D	L	L	L	D	D	W	W	D	W	L	D	L	D
Position	8	8	4	3	1	3	7	7	8	8	12	13	13	15	17	14	13	11	12	10	12	14	10	8	9	11	14	16	14	14	13	12	12	12	13	11	12	13

Source: La Liga
A = Away; H = Home; W = Win; D = Draw; L = Loss

==== Matches ====
27 August 2011 1	Granada	0–1	Betis	Granada
21:00 CEST	Pamarot (yellow card) 6'; Benítez (yellow card) 35'		Iriney (yellow card) 16'; Dorado (yellow card) 55'; Castro 88'	Stadium: Nuevo Los Cármenes; Attendance: 18,000; Referee: Miguel Pérez Lasa

11 September 2011 2	Betis	1–0	Mallorca	Seville
12:00 CEST	Amaya (yellow card) 11'; Sevilla (yellow card) 55'; Castro 86'	Report	Cáceres (yellow card) 31'; João Victor (yellow card) 45+1'; Pina (yellow card) 79'; Flores (yellow card) 82'	Stadium: Benito Villamarín; Attendance: 35,125; Referee: Carlos del Cerro Grande

18 September 2011 3	Athletic Bilbao	2–3	Betis	Bilbao
22:00 CEST	De Marcos 38', (yellow card) 45'; Gurpegui (yellow card) 51'; Amorebieta (yellow card) 53' (yellow-red card) 90+5'; Muniain (yellow card) 75'; López 86' (pen.)	Report	Beñat 7', (yellow card) 72'; Nacho 13', (yellow card) 24'; Iriney (yellow card) 41'; Sevilla 45' (pen.); Mario (yellow card) 75' (red card) 75'; Casto (yellow card) 78'; Chica (yellow card) 86'	Stadium: San Mamés; Attendance: 30,000; Referee: Miguel Ángel Gámez

22 September 2011 4	Betis	4–3	Zaragoza	Seville
22:00 CEST	Santa Cruz 7', 49'; Sevilla 12' (pen.); Beñat 47' (pen.); Casto (red card) 69'		Juárez 36'; Da Silva (yellow card) 47'; Juan Carlos 77', 79'; Zuculini (yellow card) 82'	Stadium: Benito Villamarín; Attendance: 39,000; Referee: Antonio Mateu Lahoz

26 September 2011 5	Getafe	1–0	Betis	Getafe
21:00 CEST	Lopo (yellow card) 30'; Castro 31', (yellow card) 83'; Pedro León (yellow card) 41'; Mané (yellow card) 58'; Valera (yellow card) 88'		Mario (yellow card) 9'; Iriney (yellow card) 45'; Molina (yellow card) 83'	Stadium: Coliseum Alfonso Pérez; Attendance: 12,000; Referee: Javier Turienzo Álvarez

2 October 2011 6	Betis	0–1	Levante	Seville
16:00 CEST	Pereira (yellow card) 45+1'; Iriney (yellow card) 71'		Venta (yellow card) 24'; Nano (yellow card) 28'; Juanlu 33', (yellow card) 45+2'; Barkero (yellow card) 58'	Stadium: Benito Villamarín; Attendance: 36,000; Referee: José González González

15 October 2011 7	Real Madrid	4–1	Betis	Madrid
18:00 CEST	Pepe (yellow card) 24'; Higuaín 46', 70', 73'; Kaká 59'		Sevilla (yellow card) 60'; Beñat (yellow card) 65'; Molina 69'; Momo (yellow card) 86'	Stadium: Santiago Bernabéu; Attendance: 72,000; Referee: Carlos Delgado Ferreiro

23 October 2011 8	Betis	0–2	Rayo Vallecano	Seville
12:00 CEST	Chica (yellow card) 11'; Amaya (yellow card) 69'; Mario (yellow card) 88'		Tito (yellow card) 31'; Casado (yellow card) 47'; Bangoura 80'; Botelho (yellow card) 84'; Koke 89' (pen.)	Stadium: Benito Villamarín; Attendance: 36,000; Referee: Alberto Undiano Mallenco

27 October 2011 9	Espanyol	1–0	Betis	Cornellà de Llobregat
20:00 CEST	López (yellow card) 64'; Pandiani 75', (yellow card) 76'; Dátolo (yellow card) 78'; Forlín (yellow card) 81'; Verdú (yellow card) 85'		Beñat (yellow card) 55'; Pereira (yellow card) 89'	Stadium: Cornellà-El Prat; Attendance: 19,000; Referee: José Antonio Vitienes

30 October 2011 10	Racing Santander	1–0	Betis	Santander
18:00 CET	Francis (yellow card) 12'; Álvaro (yellow card) 33'; Diop (yellow card) 53'; Stuani 62' (pen.); Munitis (yellow card) 68'		Isidoro (yellow card) 61'	Stadium: El Sardinero; Attendance: 11,000; Referee: Carlos Clos Gómez

5 November 2011 11	Betis	0–0	Málaga	Seville
20:00 CET	Isidoro (yellow card) 89'; Ezequiel (yellow card) 90+1'		Duda (yellow card) 74'	Stadium: Benito Villamarín; Attendance: 36,000; Referee: Fernando Teixeira Vitienes

19 November 2011 12	Villarreal	1–0	Betis	Villarreal
18:00 CET	Valero 21', (yellow card) 77'; Bruno (yellow card) 38'; Rubén (yellow card) 43'; Musacchio (yellow card) 69'; López (yellow card) 90+2'		Isidoro (yellow card) 6'; Castro (yellow card) 40'	Stadium: El Madrigal; Attendance: 17,000; Referee: César Muñiz Fernández

27 November 2011 13	Betis	2–3	Real Sociedad	Seville
12:00 CET	Casto (yellow card) 22'; Beñat (yellow card) 28'; Iriney (yellow card) 74'; Pereira 81', 85'		González (yellow card) 52'; Agirretxe 56'; Griezmann (yellow card) 58'; Vela 76'; I. Martínez 90+1', (yellow card) 90+2'	Stadium: Benito Villamarín; Attendance: 30,000; Referee: Alfonso Álvarez Izquierdo

4 December 2011 14	Osasuna	2–1	Betis	Pamplona
18:00 CET	Damià (yellow card) 6'; Rovérsio (yellow card) 28'; Flaño 39'; Nekounam (yellow card) 86', (goal) 90+3'		Nacho (yellow card) 22'; Castro 80'; Pereira (yellow card) 90+2'	Stadium: El Sadar; Attendance: 15,701; Referee: Miguel Ayza Gámez

10 December 2011 15	Betis	2–1	Valencia	Seville
20:00 CET	Mario (yellow card) 36'; Pereira (yellow card) 78'; Castro 90+1', 90+3', (yellow card) 90+1'		T. Costa (yellow card) 26'; Soldado (yellow card) 47'; Barragán (yellow card) 59'; Dorado 66' (o.g.)	Stadium: Benito Villamarín; Attendance: 25,000; Referee: Miguel Pérez Lasa

18 December 2011 16	Atlético Madrid	0–2	Betis	Madrid
12:00 CET	Domínguez (yellow card) 29'; Assunção (yellow card) 40'; Gabi (yellow card) 80'		Cañas (yellow card) 44'; Pozuelo 55', (yellow card) 56' (yellow-red card) 73'; Iriney (yellow card) 58'; Nacho (yellow card) 72'; Casto (yellow card) 87'; Santa Cruz 90'	Stadium: Vicente Calderón; Attendance: 35,000; Referee: José González González

8 January 2012 17	Betis	2–0	Sporting Gijón	Seville
19:45 CET	Santa Cruz 23'; Beñat (yellow card) 89'; Molina 90+2'		Lora (yellow card) 39' (yellow-red card) 43'; Carmelo (yellow card) 70' (yellow-red card) 90+4'; Botía (yellow card) 79'; Morán (yellow card) 84'	Stadium: Benito Villamarín; Attendance: 35,000; Referee: Xavier Estrada Fernández

15 January 2012 18	Barcelona	4–2	Betis	Barcelona
21:30 CET	Xavi 10'; Messi 12', 86' (pen.), (yellow card) 44'; Puyol (yellow card) 49'; Iniesta (yellow card) 69'		Castro 32'; Iriney (yellow card) 42'; Sevilla (yellow card) 47'; Santa Cruz 52'; Mario (yellow card) 60' (yellow-red card) 71'; Matilla (yellow card) 81'; Dorado (yellow card) 85'	Stadium: Camp Nou; Attendance: 69,889; Referee: Ignacio Iglesias Villanueva

21 January 2012 19	Betis	1–1	Sevilla	Seville
20:00 CET	Iriney (yellow card) 18'; Beñat 26', (yellow card) 72'; Isidoro (yellow card) 59'; Nacho (yellow card) 78'; Castro (yellow card) 90'		Fazio (yellow card) 25' (yellow-red card) 70'; Negredo 41'	Stadium: Benito Villamarín; Attendance: 48,000; Referee: Carlos Delgado Ferreiro

29 January 2012 20	Betis	1–2	Granada	Seville
12:00 CET	Sevilla (yellow card) 19'; Pereira 81'; Nacho (yellow card) 88'; Mario (yellow card) 90'		Ighalo 13', (yellow card) 82'; Yebda (yellow card) 21'; Martins 40'; Romero (yellow card) 80'; Benítez (yellow card) 85'; López (yellow card) 88'; Júlio César (yellow card) 90+4'	Stadium: Benito Villamarín; Attendance: 32,000; Referee: Javier Turienzo Álvarez

4 February 2012 21	Mallorca	1–0	Betis	Palma
18:00 CET	Castro 24'; Ramis (yellow card) 59' (yellow-red card) 86'; Martí (yellow card) 65'; Cáceres (yellow card) 81'; Víctor (yellow card) 90+1' (yellow-red card) 90+3'		Mario (yellow card) 23' (yellow-red card) 75'; Iriney (yellow card) 51'	Stadium: Iberostar; Attendance: 9,000; Referee: Carlos Velasco Carballo

11 February 2012 22	Betis	2–1	Athletic Bilbao	Seville
22:00 CET	Castro 9'; Iriney (yellow card) 47'; Molina (yellow card) 49'; Beñat (yellow card) 60'; Nélson (yellow card) 72', (goal) 90+1'; Santa Cruz (yellow card) 90+3'		Martínez 23', (yellow card) 29' (yellow-red card) 64'; Aurtenetxe (yellow card) 49'	Stadium: Benito Villamarín; Attendance: 30,000; Referee: José Teixeira Vitienes

20 February 2012 23	Zaragoza	0–2	Betis	Zaragoza
21:00 CET	Oriol (yellow card) 36'; Apoño (yellow card) 45+2'; Da Silva (yellow card) 90+2'		Castro 41', 68', (yellow card) 65'; Sevilla (yellow card) 45'; Cañas (yellow card) 66'; Beñat (yellow card) 85'	Stadium: La Romareda; Attendance: 24,000; Referee: Carlos del Cerro Grande

25 February 2012 24	Betis	1–1	Getafe	Seville
18:00 CET	Juanma (yellow card) 37'; Molina 51'; Santa Cruz (yellow card) 67'		Casquero (yellow card) 14'; Barrada (yellow card) 21'; Dorado 55' (o.g.); Valera (yellow card) 58'; Güiza (yellow card) 74'; Miku (yellow card) 76'; Díaz (yellow card) 86'	Stadium: Benito Villamarín; Attendance: 42,160; Referee: César Muñiz Fernández

5 March 2012 25	Levante	3–1	Betis	Valencia
21:00 CET	López (yellow card) 12'; Barkero 34'; Ballesteros (yellow card) 36'; Torres 42'; Koné 51'; Iborra (yellow card) 67'; Valdo (yellow card) 72'; Juanfran (yellow card) 85'		Molina 44'; Sevilla (yellow card) 46'; Fabricio (yellow card) 57'; Pereira (yellow card) 64'	Stadium: Ciutat de València; Attendance: 12,000; Referee: Xavier Estrada Fernández

10 March 2012 26	Betis	2–3	Real Madrid	Seville
22:00 CET	Molina 10'; Iriney (yellow card) 35'; Montero 55'		Higuaín 25', (yellow card) 38'; Kaká (yellow card) 37'; Ronaldo 52', 73'; Arbeloa (yellow card) 90+2'	Stadium: Benito Villamarín; Attendance: 55,000; Referee: Eduardo Iturralde González

17 March 2012 27	Rayo Vallecano	3–0	Betis	Madrid
22:00 CET	Casado (yellow card) 12'; Fuego (yellow card) 36'; Armenteros 51'; Costa 78'; Tamudo 90+1'		Nacho (yellow card) 18'; Pereira (yellow card) 83'	Stadium: Campo de Vallecas; Attendance: 14,500; Referee: Alberto Undiano Mallenco

22 March 2012 28	Betis	1–1	Espanyol	Seville
20:00 CET	Juanma (yellow card) 29'; Castro 79'		Baena (yellow card) 42'; Moreno (yellow card) 68'; Pandiani 90+3'	Stadium: Benito Villamarín; Attendance: 34,500; Referee: Ignacio Iglesias Villanueva

25 March 2012 29	Betis	1–1	Racing Santander	Seville
19:45 CET	Santa Cruz 18'; Dorado (yellow card) 27'; Nacho (yellow card) 88'; Paulão (yellow card) 90+1'		Christian (yellow card) 16'; Gullón (yellow card) 33'; Bedia (yellow card) 55'; Arana (yellow card) 74'; Stuani 79', (yellow card) 80'	Stadium: Benito Villamarín; Attendance: 32,000; Referee: Alfonso Álvarez Izquierdo

31 March 2012 30	Málaga	0–2	Betis	Málaga
22:00 CEST	Weligton (yellow card) 39'		Nacho (yellow card) 34'; Castro (yellow card) 40'; Dorado 45+1', (yellow card) 56'; Nélson (yellow card) 67'; Fabricio (yellow card) 72'	Stadium: La Rosaleda; Attendance: 23,000; Referee: Fernando Teixeira Vitienes

7 April 2012 31	Betis	3–1	Villarreal	Seville
22:00 CEST	Paulão (yellow card) 21'; Santa Cruz 35'; Castro 38'; Pereira (yellow card) 42'; Montero (yellow card) 58'; Beñat 59'; Fabricio (yellow card) 90+3'		Ángel (yellow card) 16' (yellow-red card) 66'; Oriol (yellow card) 38'; Rubén 90+3' (pen.)	Stadium: Benito Villamarín; Attendance: 37,000; Referee: Carlos Velasco Carballo

10 April 2012 32	Real Sociedad	1–1	Betis	San Sebastián
20:00 CEST	Vela 56'		Cañas (yellow card) 39'; Castro (yellow card) 50', (goal) 70'; Chica (yellow card) 61'	Stadium: Anoeta; Attendance: 24,000; Referee: Antonio Mateu Lahoz

15 April 2012 33	Betis	1–0	Osasuna	Seville
16:00 CEST	Castro 34'; Paulão (yellow card) 56'		Loé (yellow card) 50'; García (red card) 61'; Lolo (yellow card) 83'	Stadium: Benito Villamarín; Attendance: 37,000; Referee: Miguel Ayza Gámez

22 April 2012 34	Valencia	4–0	Betis	Valencia
21:30 CEST	Jonas 7'; Albelda (yellow card) 17'; Feghouli 63'; R. Costa (yellow card) 68'; Soldado 86'; Piatti 88'		Cañas (yellow card) 11'; Beñat (yellow card) 20'; Dorado (red card) 57'; Molina (red card) 89'	Stadium: Mestalla; Attendance: 39,000; Referee: César Muñiz Fernández

29 April 2012 35	Betis	2–2	Atlético Madrid	Seville
19:30 CEST	Matilla (yellow card) 45'; Pereira (yellow card) 72', (goal) 88'; Iriney (yellow card) 81'; Pozuelo 86'; Amaya (yellow card) 90'		Tiago (yellow card) 26'; Salvio (yellow card) 41'; Koke 64'; Falcao 90+4'	Stadium: Benito Villamarín; Attendance: 25,000; Referee: José Teixeira Vitienes

2 May 2012 36	Sevilla	1–2	Betis	Seville
20:00 CEST	Negredo 5', (yellow card) 39'; Fazio (yellow card) 45+2'; Trochowski (yellow card) 71'; Medel (yellow card) 83' (yellow-red card) 90+1'		Beñat (yellow card) 34', (goal) 44', 90+2'; Dorado (yellow card) 73'; Montero (yellow card) 76'; Cañas (yellow card) 89'	Stadium: Ramón Sánchez Pizjuán; Attendance: 45,000; Referee: Carlos Delgado Ferreiro

5 May 2012 37	Sporting Gijón	2–1	Betis	Gijón
19:00 CEST	Sangoy 13' (pen.), 55'; Ayoze (yellow card) 46'; Cases (yellow card) 82'		Amaya (yellow card) 12'; Paulão (yellow card) 43'; Molina 45+1'; Nono (yellow card) 52'	Stadium: El Molinón; Attendance: 15,156; Referee: Carlos Velasco Carballo

12 May 2012 38	Betis	2–2	Barcelona	Seville
20:00 CEST	Castro 71', 75'; Beñat (yellow card) 81'; Cañas (yellow card) 90'		Busquets 9'; Alves (yellow card) 32' (yellow-red card) 53'; Keita 90+1'	Stadium: Benito Villamarín; Attendance: 37,000; Referee: Miguel Ayza Gámez
