= 2012–13 Real Betis season =

Real Betis
2012–13 season
- President: Miguel Guillén
- Head coach: Pepe Mel
- Stadium: Benito Villamarín
- La Liga: 7th
- Copa del Rey: Quarter-finals
- Top goalscorer: League: Rubén Castro (18); All: Rubén Castro (21)
Home colours	Away colours	Third colours

The 2012–13 Real Betis season was the club's 78th season in its history.

== Competitions ==
=== Legend ===
Win Draw Loss Postponed

=== La Liga ===
==== League table ====
Pos	Team	Pld	W	D	L	GF	GA	GD	Pts	Qualification or relegation
5	Valencia	38	19	8	11	67	54	+13	65	Qualification for the Europa League group stage (Note: Since the 2012–13 Copa del Rey champions Atlético Madrid and runners-up Real Madrid qualified for the 2013–14 UEFA Champions League, the 5th, 6th and 7th placed teams qualified for the group stage, play-off round, and third qualifying round of the 2013–14 UEFA Europa League respectively.)
6	Málaga	38	16	9	13	53	50	+3	57	(Note: Málaga was excluded from participating in any UEFA club competition in 2013–14 season as a punishment for not complying with UEFA Financial Fair Play Regulations. Málaga appealed against this UEFA ban, but the Court of Arbitration for Sport confirmed the decision of the UEFA Club Financial Control Body.)
7	Real Betis	38	16	8	14	57	56	+1	56	Qualification for the Europa League play-off round
8	Rayo Vallecano	38	16	5	17	50	66	−16	53	(Note: Rayo Vallecano was excluded from participating in any UEFA club competition for the next season after RFEF denied them a "UEFA licence" because they didn't meet the requirements as they were immersed in a creditor contest. They appealed to CAS in June 2013 and on 11 July that decision was confirmed. The team placed behind them, Sevilla, took their spot at the Europa League third qualifying round.)
9	Sevilla	38	14	8	16	58	54	+4	50	Qualification for the Europa League third qualifying round

Source: La Liga
Rules for classification: 1st points; 2nd head-to-head points; 3rd head-to-head goal difference; 4th goal difference; 5th number of goals scored; 7th Fair-play points

==== Matches ====
19 August 2012 1	Athletic Bilbao	3–5	Betis	Bilbao
19:00 CEST	De Marcos 47'; San José (yellow card) 49', (goal) 67', 76'; Aduriz (yellow card) 90+2'	Summary	Castro 7', (yellow card) 44'; Molina 26', 87'; Beñat 31', (yellow card) 58'; Pozuelo 80'	Stadium: San Mamés; Attendance: 36,000; Referee: José Texeira Vitienes (Cantabria)

25 August 2012 2	Betis	1–2	Rayo Vallecano	Seville
21:00 CEST	Molina 4', (yellow card) 90+1'; Agra (yellow card) 35'; Beñat (yellow card) 54'; Pereira (yellow card) 67'; Nacho (yellow card) 71'	Report	Piti 2', (yellow card) 59'; Casado (yellow card) 37'; Tito (yellow card) 43'; Baptistão 62'; Amat (yellow card) 89'; Rubén (yellow card) 90+5'	Stadium: Estadio Benito Villamarín; Attendance: 29,313; Referee: Miguel Ángel Ayza Gámez (Valencian Community)

17 September 2012 3	Valladolid	0–1	Betis	Valladolid
21:30 CEST		Report	Castro 89'	Stadium: José Zorrilla; Attendance: 13,000; Referee: Carlos Delgado Ferreiro (Basque Country)

22 September 2012 4	Betis	1–0	Espanyol	Seville
20:00 CEST	Paulão 18'; Beñat (yellow card) 29'; Pérez (yellow card) 46'; Nélson (yellow card) 57'; Agra (yellow card) 90'; Casto (yellow card) 90+1'	Report	Tejera (yellow card) 26'; Mubarak (yellow card) 45' (yellow-red card) 67'; J. López (yellow card) 52'; Stuani (yellow card) 78'; Álvarez (yellow card) 90+2'	Stadium: Benito Villamarín; Attendance: 40,000; Referee: Carlos Clos Gómez (Aragon)

26 September 2012 5	Betis	2–4	Atlético Madrid	Seville
21:30 CEST	Nélson (yellow card) 3'; Agra 26'; Juanfran 45+2' (o.g.); Perquis (red card) 47'; Beñat (yellow card) 49'; Campbell (yellow card) 62' (yellow-red card) 78'	Report	Juanfran (yellow card) 24'; Falcao 28', 48' (pen.); C. Rodríguez (yellow card) 53'; Costa 55'; García (yellow card) 89', (goal) 90+3'	Stadium: Benito Villamarín; Attendance: 37,000; Referee: Alfonso Álvarez Izquierdo (Catalonia)

29 September 2012 6	Málaga	4–0	Betis	Málaga
18:00 CEST	Joaquín 13' (pen.); Saviola 28'; Gámez (yellow card) 56'; Amaya 72' (o.g.); Isco 74'; Recio (yellow card) 85'	Report	Casto (red card) 10'	Stadium: La Rosaleda; Attendance: 25,753; Referee: Xavier Estrada Fernández (Catalonia)

6 October 2012 7	Betis	2–0	Real Sociedad	Seville
22:00 CEST	Paulão 18'; Martínez (yellow card) 25'; Beñat (yellow card) 42'; Mario (yellow card) 54' (yellow-red card) 88'; Agra (yellow card) 77'; Castro 81'; Pérez (yellow card) 90'	Summary	Griezmann (yellow card) 26'; Estrada (yellow card) 80'	Stadium: Benito Villamarín; Attendance: 30,886; Referee: José Teixeira Vitienes (Cantabria)

21 October 2012 8	Osasuna	0–0	Real Betis	Pamplona
19:50 CEST	Cejudo (yellow card) 30'; Armenteros (yellow card) 66'; Damià (yellow card) 82'	Summary	Paulão (yellow card) 63'	Stadium: El Sadar; Attendance: 15,215; Referee: Carlos Velasco Carballo (Community of Madrid)

27 October 2012 9	Betis	1–0	Valencia	Seville
18:00 CEST	Sevilla 9'; Nono (yellow card) 90+4'	Summary	Pereira (yellow card) 5'; Viera (yellow card) 74'; R. Costa (yellow card) 89'; Banega (yellow card) 90+4'; Gago (yellow card) 90+5'	Stadium: Benito Villamarín; Attendance: 33,783; Referee: Alejandro Hernández Hernández (Canary Islands)

5 November 2012 10	Getafe	2–4	Betis	Getafe
21:30 CET	Rafa (yellow card) 20'; Castro 68'; Barrada (yellow card) 72'; Pedro León 90'	Summary	Beñat (yellow card) 38', (goal) 74'; Molina 59'; Castro 76', (yellow card) 90+1'; Cañas (yellow card) 81'; Adrián (yellow card) 90'; Sevilla 90+3'	Stadium: Coliseum Alfonso Pérez; Attendance: 8,000; Referee: Miguel Ayza Gámez (Valencian Community)

9 November 2012 11	Betis	1–2	Granada	Seville
21:30 CET	Paulão (yellow card) 60'; Castro 62'	Summary	Torje 8'; Angulo (yellow card) 27'; Gómez (yellow card) 31'; Diakhaté (yellow card) 41'; M. Rico 74'; Brahimi (yellow card) 78'; Ortiz (yellow card) 79'; Floro Flores (yellow card) 90'; Benítez (yellow card) 90+1'	Stadium: Benito Villamarín; Attendance: 40,000; Referee: Carlos Delgado Ferreiro (Basque Country)

18 November 2012 12	Sevilla	5–1	Betis	Seville
21:30 CET	Reyes 1', 33'; Fazio 5', 43'; Spahić (yellow card) 23'; Palop (yellow card) 56'; Medel (yellow card) 64'; Rakitić 90+1'	Summary	Paulão (yellow card) 36'; Pozuelo (yellow card) 47'; Pérez (yellow card) 57' (yellow-red card) 62'; Castro 66'	Stadium: Ramón Sánchez Pizjuán; Attendance: 45,000; Referee: Fernando Teixeira Vitienes (Cantabria)

24 November 2012 13	Betis	1–0	Real Madrid	Seville
22:00 CET	Beñat 17', (yellow card) 77'; Sevilla (yellow card) 41'; Adrián (yellow card) 54'; Cañas (yellow card) 72'	Summary	Pepe (yellow card) 56'; Ramos (yellow card) 71'	Stadium: Benito Villamarín; Attendance: 48,500; Referee: Jesús Gil Manzano (Extremadura)

2 December 2012 14	Deportivo	2–3	Betis	A Coruña
17:00 CET	Ayoze (yellow card) 42'; Aythami (yellow card) 44'; Riki 56', 61'; Aguilar (yellow card) 77'		Castro 39', 55'; Sevilla (yellow card) 61'; Campbell 76'; Pérez (yellow card) 82'; Beñat (yellow card) 88'; Adrián (yellow card) 90+3'; Dorado (yellow card) 90+4'	Stadium: Riazor; Attendance: 27,000; Referee: Carlos del Cerro Grande (Community of Madrid)

9 December 2012 15	Betis	1–2	Barcelona	Seville
21:00 CET	Campbell (yellow card) 37'; Castro 39'; Vadillo (yellow card) 62'; Nacho (yellow card) 89'		Messi 16', 25'; Alba (yellow card) 61'; Pedro (yellow card) 76'	Stadium: Benito Villamarín; Attendance: 46157; Referee: Carlos Velasco Carballo (Community of Madrid)

17 December 2012 16	Celta Vigo	0–1	Betis	Vigo
21:30 CET	Toni (yellow card) 48'; Bermejo (yellow card) 74'		Juan Carlos (yellow card) 42'; Molina 81'; Amaya (yellow card) 90+1'	Stadium: Balaídos; Attendance: 12000; Referee: José González González (Castile and León)

22 December 2012 17	Betis	1–2	Mallorca	Seville
16:00 CET	Beñat 6', (yellow card) 76'; Nacho (yellow card) 64'; Chica (yellow card) 88'	Summary	Arizmendi (yellow card) 22'; Víctor (yellow card) 25', (goal) 31'; Dos Santos (yellow card) 44'; Márquez 47' (pen.), (yellow card) 90+2'	Stadium: Benito Villamarín; Attendance: 32,332; Referee: Alberto Undiano Mallenco (Navarre)

4 January 2013 18	Zaragoza	1–2	Betis	Zaragoza
21:30 CET	Movilla (yellow card) 26'; Paredes (yellow card) 45'; Postiga (yellow card) 52'; Montañés 77'; Álvaro (yellow card) 81' (red card) 90+4'; Abraham (yellow card) 90+1'	Summary	Cañas (yellow card) 19'; Amaya (yellow card) 41'; Castro 44'; Igiebor (yellow card) 50'; Molina 58'; Beñat (yellow card) 71'; Nacho (yellow card) 89'	Stadium: La Romareda; Attendance: 17,000; Referee: José Teixeira Vitienes (Cantabria)

13 January 2013 19	Betis	2–0	Levante	Seville
12:00 CET	Campbell 7'; Pérez (yellow card) 20'; Nacho; Castro 63'		Diop (yellow card) 16'; El Zhar (yellow card) 37'; Roger (yellow card) 58'; Juanfran (yellow card) 61'	Stadium: Benito Villamarín; Attendance: 36,651; Referee: César Muñiz Fernández (Asturias)

21 January 2013 20	Betis	1–1	Athletic Bilbao	Seville
21:30 CET	Castro 2' (pen.); Campbell (yellow card) 14'; Beñat (yellow card) 21'; Amaya (yellow card) 56'; Cañas (yellow card) 65'; Pérez (yellow card) 71'		Iraizoz (yellow card) 1'; Gurpegui (yellow card) 9'; Aduriz 41'; Iturraspe (yellow card) 75'	Stadium: Benito Villamarín; Attendance: 42,000; Referee: Miguel Ayza Gámez (Valencian Community)

27 January 2013 21	Rayo Vallecano	3–0	Betis	Madrid
17:00 CET	Piti 4' (pen.), (yellow card) 85'; Bangoura (yellow card) 41'; Amat (yellow card) 47'; Delibašić 64', (yellow card) 65'; Tito (yellow card) 72'; José Carlos 83'	Summary	Adrián (yellow card) 3'; Molina (yellow card) 27'; Beñat (yellow card) 30'; Campbell (yellow card) 60'	Stadium: Campo de Vallecas; Attendance: 9,000; Referee: Alejandro Hernández Hernández (Canary Islands)

3 February 2013 22	Atlético Madrid	1–0	Betis	Madrid
21:00 CET	Costa 61', (yellow card) 66'; Miranda (yellow card) 68'; Cisma (yellow card) 90+1'	Summary	Perquis (yellow card) 68'; Chica (yellow card) 68'; Cañas (yellow card) 70'; Nacho (yellow card) 78'	Stadium: Vicente Calderón; Attendance: 35,000; Referee: Alberto Undiano Mallenco (Navarre)

11 February 2013 23	Real Betis	0–0	Valladolid	Seville
21:30 CET	Amaya (yellow card) 82' (yellow-red card) 90+3'	Summary	Sereno (yellow card) 18'; Rukavina (yellow card) 28' (yellow-red card) 75'; Guerra (yellow card) 40'; Sastre (yellow card) 66'	Stadium: Benito Villamarín; Attendance: 26,785; Referee: Miguel Pérez Lasa

17 February 2013 24	Espanyol	1–0	Betis	Cornellà de Llobregat
CET	García 7'; Sánchez (yellow card) 36'; Mattioni (yellow card) 51'; Capdevila (yellow card) 65'; Simão (yellow card) 77'	Summary	Paulão (yellow card) 61'; Juan Carlos (yellow card) 79'; Perquis (yellow card) 88'	Stadium: Cornellà-El Prat; Attendance: 20,410

24 February 2013 25	Betis	3–0	Málaga	Seville
CET	Molina 1'; Nacho (yellow card) 21'; Mario 28'; Pabón 45'; Juan Carlos (yellow card) 60'	Summary	Camacho (yellow card) 34' (yellow-red card) 63'; Portillo (yellow card) 49'	Stadium: Benito Villamarín; Attendance: 32,611

3 March 2013 26	Real Sociedad	3–3	Betis	San Sebastián
CET	C. Martínez (yellow card) 36'; Vela 51'; I. Martínez 56'; Prieto 62' (pen.)	Summary	Molina 29'; Campbell (yellow card) 38'; Beñat (yellow card) 42'; Pabón 49', 66'; Ángel (yellow card) 61'; Cañas (yellow card) 72'; Chica (yellow card) 90+1'	Stadium: Anoeta; Attendance: 22,162; Referee: Ignacio Iglesias

8 March 2013 27	Betis	2–1	Osasuna	Seville
CET	Molina 19'; Nacho (yellow card) 29'; Juan Carlos (yellow card) 57'; Beñat (yellow card) 69'; Paulão (yellow card) 72'; Nono (yellow card) 76'; Castro 79'	Summary	Oier (yellow card) 26'; Damià (yellow card) 41'; Armenteros (yellow card) 52'; Silva 74', (red card) 90'; Arribas (yellow card) 83'	Stadium: Benito Villamarín; Attendance: 23,824; Referee: Alejandro Hernández Hernández

16 March 2013 28	Valencia	3–0	Betis	Valencia
17:00	Soldado 16' (pen.); Rami (yellow card) 38'; Mathieu (yellow card) 44'; Feghouli (yellow card) 75'; Paulão 85' (o.g.); Jonas 90+2'	Summary	Nacho (yellow card) 11'; Amaya (red card) 15'; Molina (yellow card) 58'; Ángel (yellow card) 75'	Stadium: Mestalla; Attendance: 35,000; Referee: César Muñiz Fernández

1 April 2013 29	Betis	0–0	Getafe	Seville
16:00	Beñat (yellow card) 53'; Amaya (yellow card) 76'; Cañas (yellow card) 88'; Campbell (yellow card) 90+1'	Summary	Borja (yellow card) 18'; Torres (yellow card) 75'	Stadium: Benito Villamarín; Attendance: 25,081; Referee: Fernando Teixeira Vitienes

5 April 2013 30	Granada	1–5	Betis	Granada
15:00	Siqueira (yellow card) 58' (yellow-red card) 79'; Brahimi (yellow card) 71'; Aranda 72'; Buonanotte (yellow card) 82'	Summary	Igiebor (yellow card) 1'; Castro 30', 32'; Pabón 53'; Ángel (yellow card) 75', (goal) 85'	Stadium: Los Cármenes; Attendance: 20,000; Referee: Miguel Pérez Lasa

12 April 2013 31	Betis	3–3	Sevilla	Seville
16:00	Beñat (yellow card) 6'; Chica (yellow card) 30'; Amaya (yellow card) 30'; Pabón 43'; Castro 54' (pen.); Cañas (yellow card) 56'; Campbell (yellow card) 63'; Igiebor 89'	Summary	Rakitić 7', 19'; Negredo 33'; Fazio (yellow card) 53'; Medel (red card) 56'; Cala (yellow card) 89'; Moreno (yellow card) 90+4'	Stadium: Benito Villamarín; Attendance: 43,000; Referee: Carlos del Cerro Grande

20 April 2013 32	Real Madrid	3–1	Betis	Madrid
	Özil 45', 90+1'; Benzema 57'; Nacho (yellow card) 72'; Higuaín (yellow card) 78'; Ronaldo (yellow card) 81'	Summary	Cañas (yellow card) 55'; Molina 73' (pen.)	Stadium: Santiago Bernabéu; Attendance: 75,000; Referee: Alfonso Álvarez Izquierdo

29 April 2013 33	Betis	1–1	Deportivo	Seville
16:00	Cañas (yellow card) 29'; Vadillo (yellow card) 43'; Molina 49'; Campbell (yellow card) 63'; Chica (yellow card) 69'; Nacho (yellow card) 70'	Summary	Riki 7'; Aythami (yellow card) 38'; Aguilar (yellow card) 59'; Pizzi (yellow card) 77'; Oliveira (yellow card) 90+3'	Stadium: Benito Villamarín; Attendance: 32,800; Referee: Jesús Gil Manzano

5 May 2013 34	Barcelona	4–2	Betis	Barcelona
	Sánchez 9'; Adriano (yellow card) 45'; Villa 56'; Messi 60', 71'	Summary	Pabón 2'; Pérez 43', (yellow card) 54'	Stadium: Camp Nou; Attendance: 67,185; Referee: Carlos Clos Gómez

12 May 2013 35	Betis	1–0	Celta Vigo	Seville
	Mabwati (yellow card) 37'; Castro 90'	Summary	Krohn-Dehli (yellow card) 39'; Mallo (yellow card) 52'; Oubiña (yellow card) 62' (yellow-red card) 86'; Charles 67'; Nolito 74'; Rafinha (yellow card) 82'	Stadium: Benito Villamarín; Attendance: 38,547; Referee: Fernando Teixeira Vitienes

20 May 2013 36	Mallorca	1–0	Betis	Palma
	Martí (yellow card) 13'; Hemed 21'; Hutton (yellow card) 43'; Arizmendi (yellow card) 84'; Aouate (yellow card) 90+1'	Summary	Pérez (yellow card) 59'; Nacho (yellow card) 75'	Stadium: Iberostar; Attendance: 13,000; Referee: Miguel Pérez Lasa

26 May 2013 37	Betis	4–0	Zaragoza	Seville
	Castro 1'; Pabón 17', 71'; Adrián (yellow card) 31'; Amaya (yellow card) 32'	Summary	Abraham (yellow card) 15'; Săpunaru (yellow card) 36'; Álvaro (yellow card) 50'; Loovens (yellow card) 76'; José Mari (yellow card) 83'; Apoño (yellow card) 88'	Stadium: Benito Villamarín; Attendance: 47,469; Referee: Antonio Mateu Lahoz

1 June 2013 38	Levante	1–1	Betis	Valencia
	García (yellow card) 11'; Ríos (yellow card) 42', (goal) 51'; Rodas (yellow card) 87'	Summary	Sevilla (yellow card) 33'; Pérez (yellow card) 40'; Molina 67'; Casto (yellow card) 90'; Nono (yellow card) 90'	Stadium: Ciutat de València; Attendance: 13,045; Referee: Fernando Teixeira Vitienes

=== Copa del Rey ===
==== Round of 32 ====
1 November 2012 First leg	Valladolid	1–0	Betia	Valladolid
17:00	Bueno 39'; Sereno (red card) 63'; Neira (yellow card) 65'; Baraja (yellow card) 73'; Balenziaga (yellow card) 79'; Peña (yellow card) 87'		Paulão (yellow card) 43'	Stadium: Nuevo José Zorrilla; Attendance: 11,674; Referee: Xavier Estrada Fernández

27 November 2012 Second leg	Betis	3–0 (3–1 agg.)	Valladolid	Seville
19:30	Molina (yellow card) 38'; Amaya 28', (yellow card) 60'; Castro 62'; Rueda 86' (o.g.)		Sastre (yellow card) 28'	Stadium: Benito Villamarín; Attendance: 27,789; Referee: Alfonso Álvarez Izquierdo

==== Round of 16 ====
13 December 2012 First leg	Las Palmas	1–1	Betis	Las Palmas
22:00	Murillo (yellow card) 11'; Corrales (yellow card) 16'; Nauzet (yellow card) 58'; Chrisantus 85'		Igiebor (yellow card) 8'; Mario (yellow card) 35'; Pérez (yellow card) 57'; Castro 67'	Stadium: Gran Canaria; Attendance: 14,640; Referee: Carlos Delgado Ferreiro

10 January 2013 Second leg	Betis	1–0 (2–1 agg.)	Las Palmas	Seville
21:30	Castro 85'			Stadium: Benito Villamarín; Attendance: 27,755; Referee: Fernando Teixeira Vitienes

== Transfers ==
=== In ===
Date	Pos.	Name	From	Fee
15 June 2012	FW	(Costa Rica) Joel Campbell	(England) Arsenal	Loan
10 July 2012	DF	(Brazil) Paulão	(France) Saint-Étienne	Free

=== Out ===
Date	Pos.	Name	From	Fee
13 May 2012	FW	(Paraguay) Roque Santa Cruz	(England) Manchester City	Loan end
13 May 2012	MD	(Ecuador) Jefferson Montero	(Spain) Villarreal	Loan end
