= 2016–17 Málaga CF season =

Málaga
2016–17 season
- Owner: Sheikh Abdullah Al Thani
- Manager: Míchel
- Stadium: La Rosaleda
- La Liga: 11th
- Copa del Rey: Round of 32
Home colours	Away colours	Third colours

The 2016–17 season is the 85th season in Málaga CF's history and it's 36th in La Liga.

== Squad ==
As of 23 August 2016

Note: Flags indicate national team as defined under FIFA eligibility rules; some limited exceptions apply. Players may hold more than one non-FIFA nationality.

No.	Pos.	Nation	Player
1	GK	CMR	Carlos Kameni (2nd captain)
2	DF	BFA	Bakary Koné
3	DF	BRA	Weligton
4	DF	VEN	Mikel Villanueva
5	DF	ESP	Diego Llorente (on loan from Real Madrid)
6	MF	ESP	Ignacio Camacho (3rd captain)
7	MF	ESP	Juan Carlos (on loan from Braga)
8	FW	URU	Michael Santos
9	FW	BRA	Charles
10	MF	VEN	Juanpi
11	MF	URU	Chory Castro
13	GK	UKR	Denys Boyko (on loan from Beşiktaş)
14	MF	ESP	Recio
15	DF	URU	Federico Ricca

No.	Pos.	Nation	Player
16	MF	VEN	Adalberto Peñaranda (on loan from Watford)
17	MF	POR	Duda (Captain)
18	DF	VEN	Roberto Rosales
19	FW	ESP	Sandro
20	MF	ESP	Keko
21	MF	ESP	Jony
22	MF	SRB	Zdravko Kuzmanović (on loan from Basel)
23	DF	ESP	Miguel Torres
26	FW	MAR	Youssef En-Nesyri
27	GK	ESP	Aarón Escandell
29	DF	ESP	Luis Muñoz
31	MF	ESP	Pablo Fornals
39	MF	ESP	Javi Ontiveros

== Competitions ==
=== Overall ===
Competition	Started round	Current position / round	Final position / round	First match	Last match
La Liga	Matchday 1	11th	11th	19 August 2016	21 May 2017
Copa del Rey	Round of 32	Round of 32	Round of 32	30 November 2016	20 December 2016

Updated to match played 20 August 2017
Source: Competitions

=== Overview ===
Competition	Record							
Competition	Pld	W	D	L	GF	GA	GD	Win %
La Liga	38	12	10	16	49	55	−6	31.58
Copa del Rey	2	0	0	2	3	6	−3	0.00
Total	40	12	10	18	52	61	−9	30.00

Last updated: 20 August 2017
Source: Competitions

=== La liga ===
==== League table ====
Pos	Team	Pld	W	D	L	GF	GA	GD	Pts
9	Alavés	38	14	13	11	41	43	−2	55
10	Eibar	38	15	9	14	56	51	+5	54
11	Málaga	38	12	10	16	49	55	−6	46 (Note: Málaga ahead of Valencia on head-to-head points: Valencia–Málaga 2–2, Málaga–Valencia 2–0)
12	Valencia	38	13	7	18	56	65	−9	46
13	Celta Vigo	38	13	6	19	53	69	−16	45

Source: La Liga, Soccerway
Rules for classification: 1) Points; 2) Head-to-head points; 3) Head-to-head goal difference; 4) Goal difference; 5) Goals scored; 6) Fair-play points; 7) Play-off.

==== Results summary ====
Overall								Home						Away					
Pld	W	D	L	GF	GA	GD	Pts	W	D	L	GF	GA	GD	W	D	L	GF	GA	GD
38	12	10	16	49	55	−6	46	10	2	7	32	25	+7	2	8	9	17	30	−13

Last updated: 21 May 2017.
Source: Competitive matches

==== Matches ====
19 August 2016 1	Málaga	1–1	Osasuna	Málaga
20:45 CEST	Keko (yellow card) 40'; Juanpi 56', (yellow card) 90+4'	Report	Oier (yellow card) 17'; Fausto (yellow card) 68'; Buñuel (yellow card) 73'; Mérida 85'	Stadium: La Rosaleda Stadium; Attendance: 22,347; Referee: Santiago Jaime Latre

26 August 2016 2	Espanyol	2–2	Málaga	Barcelona
22:00 CEST	Gerard 28', 61'; Álvaro (yellow card) 68'; Piatti (yellow card) 89'	Report	Ricca (yellow card) 9'; Camacho (yellow card) 64'; Llorente 67'; Koné (yellow card) 74'; Kameni (yellow card) 89'; Charles 90'	Stadium: RCDE Stadium; Attendance: 17,304; Referee: Jesús Gil Manzano

10 September 2016 3	Málaga	0–2	Villarreal	Málaga
18:15 CEST	Weligton (yellow card) 39'; Recio (yellow card) 66'	Report	Costa 33', (yellow card) 47'; Sansone 44'	Stadium: La Rosaleda; Attendance: 21,867; Referee: Alberto Undiano Mallenco

17 September 2016 4	Las Palmas	1–0	Málaga	Las Palmas
20:45 CEST	Momo 10'; Gómez (yellow card) 49'; Michel (yellow card) 59'; Lemos (yellow card) 71'	Report	Recio (yellow card) 9'	Stadium: Estadio Gran Canaria; Attendance: 18,904; Referee: José María Sánchez Martínez

20 September 2016 5	Málaga	2–1	Eibar	Málaga
20:00 CEST	Sandro 44', (yellow card) 56'; Camacho (yellow card) 66'; En-Nesyri 76'	Report	Lejeune (yellow card) 29'; Rico (yellow card) 39'; Nano 42'; Escalante (yellow card) 89'; Mauro (yellow card) 90+2'	Stadium: La Rosaleda; Attendance: 19,670; Referee: Ignacio Iglesias Villanueva

23 September 2016 6	Real Betis	1–0	Málaga	Seville
20:45 CEST	Joaquín 25'; González (yellow card) 47'; Petros (yellow card) 62'; Navarro (yellow card) 72'; Cejudo (yellow card) 90+1'	Report	Sandro (yellow card) 37'; Kuzmanović (yellow card) 45'; Jony (yellow card) 45'; Camacho (yellow card) 67'; Llorente (yellow card) 78'; Castro (yellow card) 89'	Stadium: Benito Villamarín; Attendance: 33,322; Referee: Alfonso Álvarez Izquierdo

2 October 2016 7	Málaga	2–1	Athletic Bilbao	Málaga
18:30 CEST	Rosales (yellow card) 36'; Ricca (yellow card) 45+1'; Castro (yellow card) 54'; Recio (yellow card) 68'; Koné (yellow card) 70' (yellow-red card) 90+4'; Sandro 82'; Duda 83', (yellow card) 84'; Charles (yellow card) 84'; Juanpi (yellow card) 88'	Report	Aduriz 3'; Balenziaga (red card) 36'; De Marcos (yellow card) 52'; Sabin (yellow card) 59'; Laporte (yellow card) 86'	Stadium: La Rosaleda; Attendance: 23,188; Referee: Carlos del Cerro Grande

16 October 2016 8	Alavés	1–1	Málaga	Vitoria-Gasteiz
12:00 CEST	Deyverson 9'; M. García (yellow card) 66'; Hernandez (red card) 90'; Camarasa (yellow card) 90+1'	Report	Rosales (yellow card) 58', (goal) 85'; En-Nesyri (yellow card) 68'; Sandro (yellow card) 70'; Juanpi (yellow card) 70' (red card) 90+4'	Stadium: Mendizorrotza; Attendance: 14,420; Referee: Alejandro Hernández Hernández

23 October 2016 9	Málaga	4–0	Leganés	Málaga
18:30 CEST	Jony 40'; Castro 42'; Sandro 57'; Camacho 90+2'; Duda (yellow card) 90+2'	Report	Mantovani (yellow card) 15'; Rico (yellow card) 69'; López (yellow card) 90+2'	Stadium: La Rosaleda; Attendance: 19,065; Referee: Daniel Trujillo Suárez

29 October 2016 10	Atlético Madrid	4–2	Málaga	Madrid
18:30 CEST	Carrasco 7', 86'; Gameiro 24', 44'; Savić (yellow card) 49' (yellow-red card) 60'; Oblak (yellow card) 77'; Saúl (yellow card) 84'	Report	Sandro 31'; Castro (yellow card) 43' (yellow-red card) 88'; Camacho 64', (yellow card) 90+1'; En-Nesyri (yellow card) 69'; Villanueva (yellow card) 73'; Ricca (yellow card) 77'	Stadium: Vicente Calderón; Attendance: 47,471; Referee: Xavier Estrada Fernández

4 November 2016 11	Málaga	3–2	Sporting de Gijón	Málaga
20:45 CET	Castro (yellow card) 42'; Fornals 45+2', (yellow card) 90+4'; Villanueva (yellow card) 48'; Santos (yellow card) 52', (goal) 78'; Sandro 65'; Camacho (yellow card) 74'	Report	Lillo (yellow card) 11' (yellow-red card) 71'; Viguera 13'; Amorebieta (yellow card) 28'; López (yellow card) 35'; Álvarez (yellow card) 40'; Čop 49'	Stadium: La Rosaleda; Attendance: 20,558; Referee: Jesús Gil Manzano

19 November 2016 12	Barcelona	0–0	Málaga	Barcelona
16:15 CET		Report	Ricca (yellow card) 22'; Ontiveros (yellow card) 62'; Llorente (red card) 68'; Juan Carlos (red card) 90+7'	Stadium: Camp Nou; Attendance: 83,439; Referee: Ricardo de Burgos Bengoetxea

26 November 2016 13	Málaga	4–3	Deportivo La Coruña	A Coruña
13:00 CET	Santos 21' (pen.), 56'; Sandro 40'; Juanpi (yellow card) 76'; Camacho (yellow card) 78'; Ontiveros 90+2', (yellow card) 90+2'	Report	Borges 4' (pen.), 81'; Luisinho (yellow card) 10'; Andone 72'	Stadium: Riazor; Attendance: 12,679; Referee: Iñaki Vicandi Garrido

4 December 2016 14	Valencia	2–2	Málaga	Valencia
20:45 CET	Rodrigo 7', (yellow card) 44'; Medrán 34', (yellow card) 73'; Cancelo (yellow card) 68'; Garay (yellow card) 73'; Abdennour (yellow card) 85'	Report	Fornals 3', 90+3'; Castro (yellow card) 9'	Stadium: Mestalla; Attendance: 23,121; Referee: Ignacio Iglesias Villanueva

9 December 2016 15	Málaga	1–1	Granada	Málaga
20:45 CET	Camacho 24'; Torres (yellow card) 43'; Fornals (yellow card) 46'; Villanueva (yellow card) 90+2'	Report	Tito (yellow card) 27'; Uche (yellow card) 47'; Saunier (yellow card) 61'; Cuenca (yellow card) 74'; Kravets 81'; Lombán (yellow card) 87'	Stadium: La Rosaleda; Attendance: 20,299; Referee: Alfonso Álvarez Izquierdo

18 December 2016 16	Sevilla	4–1	Málaga	Seville
20:45 CET	Vietto 25', 28'; Pareja (yellow card) 29'; Ben Yedder 34'; Vitolo 35'; Nzonzi (yellow card) 58'; Rami (yellow card) 61' (yellow-red card) 61'	Report	Sandro 64'; Ontiveros (yellow card) 71'; Rosales (yellow card) 82'; Villanueva (yellow card) 90+2'	Stadium: Ramón Sánchez Pizjuán; Attendance: 30,324; Referee: Carlos Clos Gómez

8 January 2017 17	Celta Vigo	3–1	Málaga	Vigo
18:30 CET	Aspas 7'; Was 60'; Fontàs 73'; Gómez (yellow card) 85'	Report	Fornals (yellow card) 29'; Recio (yellow card) 49'; Camacho (yellow card) 77'; Wass 86' (o.g.); Juan Carlos (yellow card) 90'	Stadium: Balaídos; Attendance: 17,890; Referee: José González González

16 January 2017 18	Málaga	0–2	Real Sociedad	Málaga
20:45 CET		Report	I. Martínez 50'; Granero (yellow card) 55'; Juanmi 62'; Illarramendi (yellow card) 70'	Stadium: La Rosaleda; Attendance: 18,057; Referee: Antonio Mateu Lahoz

21 January 2017 19	Real Madrid	2–1	Málaga	Madrid
16:15 CET	Ramos 35', 43'; Casemiro (yellow card) 37'; Vázquez (yellow card) 85'	Report	Juan Carlos (yellow card) 39'; Juanpi 63'; Camacho (yellow card) 78'; Santos (yellow card) 85'	Stadium: Santiago Bernabéu; Attendance: 68,708; Referee: Jesús Gil Manzano

27 January 2017 20	Osasuna	1–1	Málaga	Pamplona
20:45 CET	Fernández (yellow card) 18'; Čaušić 76'	Report	Camacho 79'	Stadium: El Sadar; Attendance: 14,327; Referee: Ricardo de Burgos Bengoetxea

4 February 2017 21	Málaga	0–1	Espanyol	Málaga
13:00 CET	Demichelis (yellow card) 41'	Report	Piatti 17' (yellow card) 52'; Pérez (yellow card) 33'; Roca (yellow card) 70'; Diego López (yellow card) 89'	Stadium: La Rosaleda; Attendance: 21,886; Referee: Daniel Ocón Arráiz

12 February 2017 22	Villarreal	1–1	Málaga	Vilarreal
12:00 CET	Bruno 62' (pen.); Soriano (red card) 71'	Report	Charles 14', (yellow card) 55'; Camacho (yellow card) 55'; Keko (yellow card) 58'; Demichelis (yellow card) 61'; Duda (yellow card) 81'	Stadium: La Cerámica; Attendance: 17,120; Referee: Iñaki Vicandi Garrido

20 February 2017 23	Málaga	2–1	Las Palmas	Málaga
20:45 CET	Charles (yellow card) 20', (goal) 35'; Rodríguez (yellow card) 23' (yellow-red card) 70'; Fornals 26'; Camacho (yellow card) 56'; Keko (yellow card) 69'	Report	Lemos 19'; Boateng (yellow card) 60'; Jesé (yellow card) 64'; Aythami (yellow card) 84'	Stadium: La Rosaleda; Attendance: 20,787; Referee: José María Sánchez Martínez

25 February 2017 24	Eibar	3–0	Málaga	Eibar
20:45 CET	Adrián 43', 50' (pen.); Enrich 52'; Capa (yellow card) 77'; Bebé (yellow card) 90+3'	Report	Fornals (yellow card) 53'; Rosales (yellow card) 62' (yellow-red card) 71'; Ontiveros (yellow card) 77'; Torres (yellow card) 79'; Hernández (yellow card) 79'	Stadium: Ipurua; Attendance: 4,953; Referee: Xavier Estrada Fernández

28 February 2017 25	Málaga	1–2	Real Betis	Málaga
21:30 CET	Fornals 39'; Torres (yellow card) 68'; Jony (yellow card) 76'; Juan Carlos (yellow card) 90+4'	Report	Pezzella (yellow card) 36'; Martin 48'; Brašanac (yellow card) 60'; Bruno (yellow card) 63'; Sanabria 74'; Cejudo (yellow card) 82'; Adán (yellow card) 90+3'	Stadium: La Rosaleda; Attendance: 24,343; Referee: Alejandro Hernández Hernández

5 March 2017 26	Athletic Bilbao	1–0	Málaga	Bilbao
20:45 CET	Beñat (yellow card) 48'; García 72' (pen.), (yellow card) 90'; Saborit (yellow card) 90+3'	Report	Fornals (yellow card) 67'; Keko (yellow card) 72'; Juan Carlos (yellow card) 74'; Camacho (yellow card) 80'; Charles (yellow card) 90'	Stadium: San Mamés; Attendance: 33,438; Referee: Alfonso Álvarez Izquierdo

11 March 2017 27	Málaga	1–2	Alavés	Málaga
18:30 CET	Camacho (yellow card) 65'; Juan Carlos 71'; Demichelis (yellow card) 76'	Report	Feddal 39', (yellow card) 56' (yellow-red card) 72'; Deyverson (yellow card) 83'; Édgar 90+1'	Stadium: La Rosaleda; Attendance: 23,716; Referee: Alberto Undiano Mallenco

19 March 2017 28	Leganés	0–0	Málaga	Leganés
12:00 CET	Bustinza (yellow card) 29'; Tito (yellow card) 32'; Morán (yellow card) 50'; Pérez (yellow card) 60'	Report	Rosales (yellow card) 34'; Charles (yellow card) 59'	Stadium: Butarque; Attendance: 9,382; Referee: Antonio Mateu Lahoz

1 April 2017 29	Málaga	0–2	Atlético Madrid	Málaga
20:45	Juan Carlos (yellow card) 76'; Recio (yellow card) 76'	Report	Hernandez (yellow card) 19'; Koke 26'; Savić (yellow card) 31'; Filipe Luís 74'	Stadium: La Rosaleda; Attendance: 27,082; Referee: Daniel Trujillo Suárez

5 April 2017 30	Sporting de Gijón	0–1	Málaga	Gijón
20:30 CEST	Burgui (yellow card) 80'; Meré (yellow card) 86'	Report	Fornals (yellow card) 21'; Sandro 40', (yellow card) 45'; Hernández (yellow card) 58'; Keko (yellow card) 70'; Juanpi (yellow card) 90+4'	Stadium: El Molinón; Attendance: 24,503; Referee: José María Sánchez Martínez

8 April 2017 31	Málaga	2–0	Barcelona	Málaga
20:45 CEST	Sandro 32'; Ricca (yellow card) 37'; Recio (yellow card) 45'; Peñaranda (yellow card) 69'; Juan Carlos (yellow card) 82'; Jony 90'	Report	Alba (yellow card) 8'; Neymar (yellow card) 27' (yellow-red card) 65'; Umtiti (yellow card) 33'; Mascherano (yellow card) 87'	Stadium: La Rosaleda; Attendance: 28,314; Referee: Jesús Gil Manzano

15 April 2017 32	Deportivo La Coruña	2–0	Málaga	A Coruña
13:00 CEST	Guilherme (yellow card) 22'; Joselu 47'; Mosquera 67'; Arribas (yellow card) 72'; Gil (yellow card) 90+1'	Report	Recio (yellow card) 23'; Hernández (yellow card) 24'; Keko (yellow card) 73'; Camacho (yellow card) 84'	Stadium: Riazor; Attendance: 20,300; Referee: Alberto Undiano Mallenco

22 April 2017 33	Málaga	2–0	Valencia	Málaga
20:30 CEST	Recio (yellow card) 13', (goal) 36'; Sandro 40'; Llorente (yellow card) 45'; Juan Carlos (yellow card) 70'	Report	Mangala (yellow card) 39'; Parejo (yellow card) 62'; Pérez (yellow card) 70'	Stadium: La Rosaleda; Attendance: 23,422; Referee: Ignacio Iglesias Villanueva

25 April 2017 34	Granada	0–2	Málaga	Granada
20:30 CEST	Ingason (yellow card) 10'; Carcela (yellow card) 27'; Ramos (yellow card) 49'; Wakaso (yellow card) 51'; Mallé (yellow card) 72'	Report	Sandro 47', 90+2'	Stadium: Los Cármenes; Attendance: 12,099; Referee: Carlos Clos Gómez

1 May 2017 35	Málaga	4–2	Sevilla	Málaga
21:00 CEST	Fornals 38'; Camacho (yellow card) 39'; Ricca (yellow card) 49'; Sandro 51'; Llorente 77'; Juan Carlos 89', (yellow card) 90+3'	Report	Escudero (yellow card) 8'; Sarabia (yellow card) 18'; Vázquez (yellow card) 28', (goal) 30', 57'; Correa (yellow card) 39'; Iborra (yellow card) 76'	Stadium: La Rosaleda; Attendance: 22,971; Referee: Juan Martínez Munuera

7 May 2017 36	Málaga	3–0	Celta Vigo	Málaga
20:45 CEST	Ontiveros 26'; Recio 56' (pen.), (yellow card) 80'; Camacho (yellow card) 80'; Sandro 90+2'	Report	Lemos (yellow card) 14'; Jozabed (yellow card) 30'; Guidetti (yellow card) 80'; Berizzo (red card) 82'; Diop (yellow card) 89'	Stadium: La Rosaleda; Attendance: 20,552; Referee: Carlos del Cerro Grande

14 May 2017 37	Real Sociedad	2–2	Málaga	San Sebastián
20:00 CEST	Prieto 31' (pen.); Navas (yellow card) 53'; Bautista 85'	Summary	Hernández 45'; Recio 75'; Torres (yellow card) 86'; Santos (yellow card) 89'	Stadium: Anoeta; Attendance: 25,026; Referee: Santiago Jaime Latre

21 May 2017 38	Málaga	0–2	Real Madrid	Málaga
20:00 CEST	Kameni (yellow card) 56'; Jony (yellow card) 57'	Summary	Ronaldo 2'; Benzema 55'	Stadium: La Rosaleda; Attendance: 27,867; Referee: Ricardo de Burgos Bengoetxea

== See also ==
- Atlético Malagueño
- CD Málaga
- Trofeo Costa del Sol
- Football in Spain
