= Sandro Ramírez =

Spanish footballer

Sandro
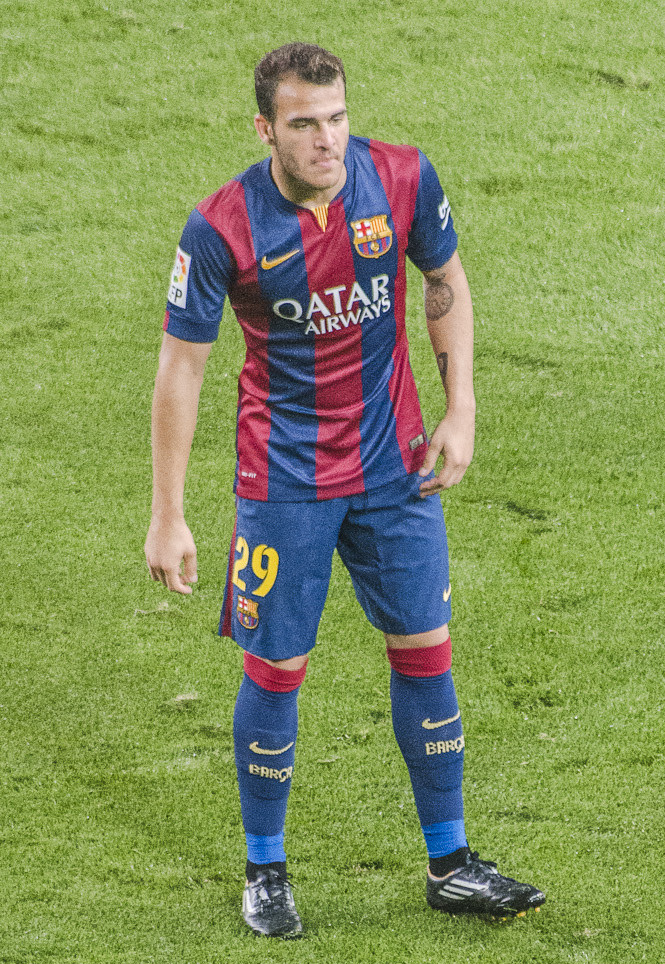
- Sandro with Barcelona in 2014

Personal information
- Full name: Sandro Ramírez Castillo
- Date of birth: 9 July 1995 (age 31)
- Place of birth: Las Palmas, Spain
- Height: 1.75 m (5 ft 9 in)
- Position: Forward

Team information
- Current team: Las Palmas
- Number: 19

Youth career
- 1999–2002: Barrio Atlántico
- 2002–2009: Las Palmas
- 2009–2013: Barcelona

Senior career*
Years	Team	Apps	(Gls)
2013–2015	Barcelona B	61	(15)
2014–2016	Barcelona	17	(2)
2016–2017	Málaga	30	(14)
2017–2020	Everton	8	(0)
2018	→ Sevilla (loan)	13	(0)
2018–2019	→ Real Sociedad (loan)	24	(0)
2019–2020	→ Valladolid (loan)	24	(3)
2020–2023	Huesca	20	(5)
2021–2022	→ Getafe (loan)	29	(3)
2022–2023	→ Las Palmas (loan)	21	(7)
2023–	Las Palmas	61	(11)

International career
2011	Spain U16	6	(5)
2011–2012	Spain U17	4	(9)
2013	Spain U18	2	(1)
2013–2014	Spain U19	7	(4)
2014–2017	Spain U21	7	(1)
- * Club domestic league appearances and goals as of 00:34, 18 March 2026 (UTC)

Sandro Ramírez Castillo (Spanish pronunciation: [ˈsandɾo raˈmiɾeθ kasˈtiʎo]; born 9 July 1995), known simply as Sandro, is a Spanish professional footballer who plays as a forward for Segunda División club Las Palmas.

He began his professional career at Barcelona playing mainly in their reserves, and won seven domestic and international honours with the first team. In 2017 he signed with Everton after a successful season with Málaga, being loaned three times before his release. In 2023–24 he equalled the record for appearing with most clubs in La Liga, with Las Palmas his eighth.

Sandro was a Spanish youth international.

== Club career ==
=== Barcelona ===
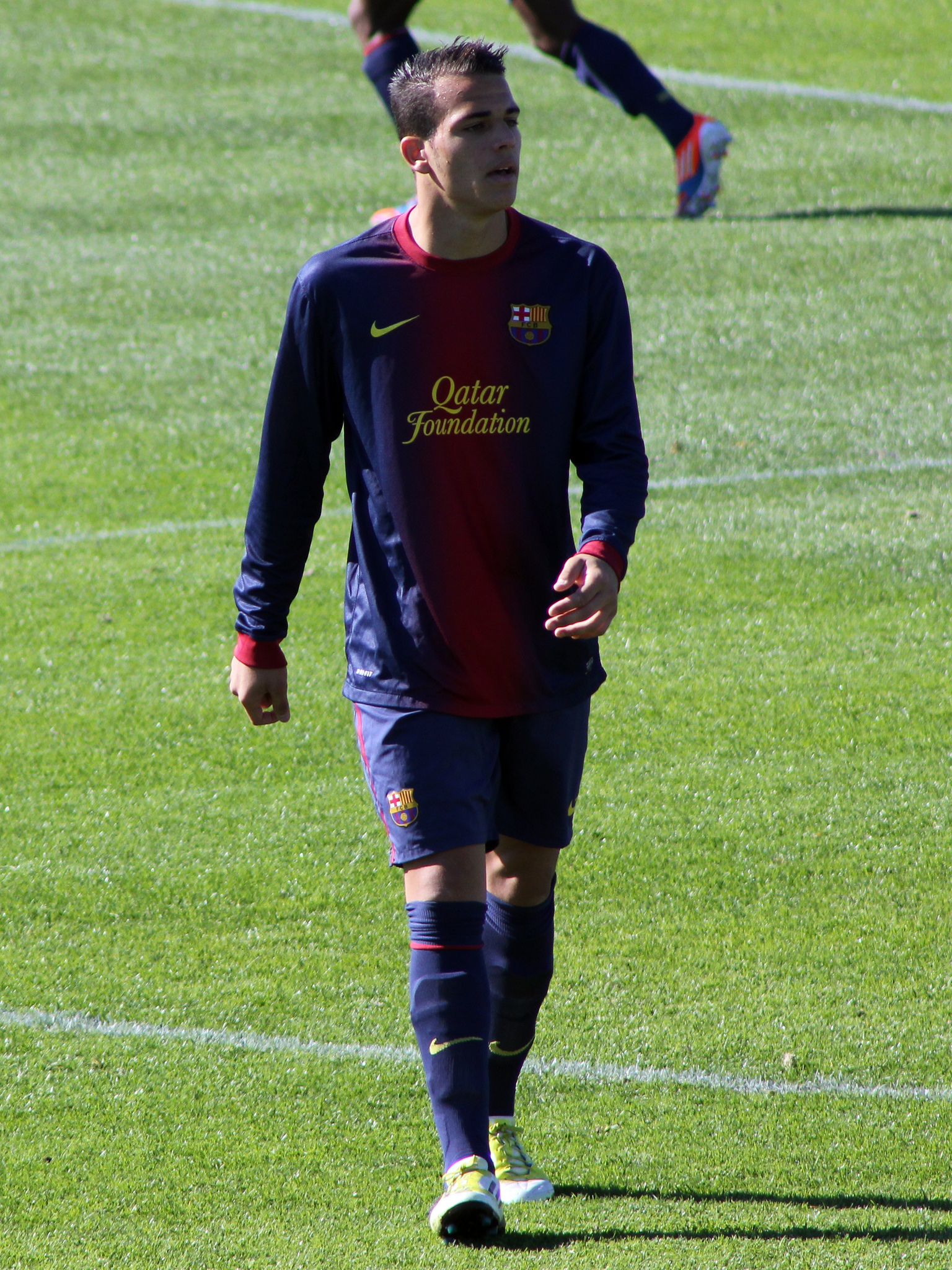
Sandro playing for Barcelona in 2012

Born in Las Palmas, Canary Islands, Sandro joined FC Barcelona's youth setup in 2009, aged 14, after starting out at local UD Las Palmas. On 10 June 2013, he was promoted to the former's B team, and made his professional debut on 17 August in a 2–1 away loss against CD Mirandés in the Segunda División.

Sandro scored his first goal as a professional on 15 September 2013, netting the first of a 2–0 home win against Real Madrid Castilla. He finished the campaign with 31 appearances, netting seven times to help his team finish third.

On 18 August 2014, Sandro scored the last of a 6–0 victory over Club León in that year's Joan Gamper Trophy, after assisting fellow youth graduate Munir El Haddadi in the fifth. He was also called up to the main squad for the match against Elche CF, but remained unused in the 3–0 La Liga win on 24 August.

Sandro made his debut in the Spanish top division on 31 August 2014, coming on as a substitute for Pedro midway through the second half of the fixture at Villarreal CF and scoring the game's only goal 12 minutes later. He netted for the only time in the UEFA Champions League on 21 October, contributing to a 3–1 group stage home win against AFC Ajax with an injury-time strike. On 16 December, he scored his first goal in the Copa del Rey, in an 8–1 home rout of SD Huesca.

On 2 December 2015, in the midst of a lengthy scoring drought for both players, Sandro scored a hat-trick and assisted once whilst Munir contributed a brace in the 6–1 home defeat of CF Villanovense in the domestic cup, to send Barcelona into the round of 16. As the former appeared in just ten league games throughout the season, technical director Robert Fernández announced in May 2016 that the player would leave the club the following month, adding he was only kept in the squad due to a transfer embargo that was to end shortly after.

=== Málaga ===
On 2 July 2016, Málaga CF leaked news of the potential signing of Sandro, and their official website temporarily featured a player profile, shortly after his release from Barcelona. Five days later, they officially announced his signing on a three-year contract. He made his debut on 19 August, starting as they began the season with a 1–1 draw against CA Osasuna, and scored his first goal four weeks later to equalise in a 2–1 win over SD Eibar also at La Rosaleda.

Sandro took his season tally to 11 on 8 April 2017 after helping defeat former club Barcelona 2–0 at home, netting the first through a solo effort that started in his own half.

=== Everton ===
On 3 July 2017, Sandro signed for Everton on a four-year contract after the club triggered a £5.2 million release clause in his Málaga contract. He made his debut on 12 August, starting in a 1–0 home win against Stoke City in the Premier League.

Sandro joined Sevilla FC on loan on 30 January 2018, for the remainder of the campaign. Seven months later, he moved to Real Sociedad also on loan.

On 2 July 2019, Sandro agreed to a one-year loan deal with Real Valladolid still in the Spanish top tier. He scored his first goal in two and a half years on 3 November, helping to a 3–0 home defeat of RCD Mallorca with a 20-meter effort in injury time.

=== Huesca ===
Sandro signed a three-year contract with Huesca on 5 October 2020, on a free transfer. On 2 August 2021, he agreed to a one-year loan deal with Getafe CF with an option to buy.

=== Las Palmas ===
On 22 August 2022, Sandro was loaned to fellow second division side Las Palmas for one year, with an obligatory buyout clause in case of promotion. This was achieved as runners-up, and in June 2023 he signed a permanent contract until 2026.

Sandro equalled the record of most clubs played for in the Spanish top flight at the start of 2023–24, as Las Palmas were his eighth, a record shared with Carlos Aranda who also represented this team. On 30 November 2024, as Barcelona were celebrating their centenary, he opened an eventual 2–1 away win; he scored a further eight during the season and provided three assists, in an eventual relegation as second-bottom.

Sandro all but missed 2025–26, due to a knee injury contracted the previous campaign from which he had not recovered fully.

== International career ==
Sandro was a member of the Spain under-21 squad for the 2017 UEFA European Championship. He scored once for the eventual runners-up, in the 3–1 group stage win against Portugal.

== Career statistics ==
As of match played 13 May 2025

Appearances and goals by club, season and competition
Club	Season	League			National Cup (Note: Appearances in Copa del Rey)		League Cup (Note: Appearances in EFL Cup)		Europe		Other		Total	
Club	Season	Division	Apps	Goals	Apps	Goals	Apps	Goals	Apps	Goals	Apps	Goals	Apps	Goals
Barcelona B	2013–14	Segunda División	31	7	—		—		—		—		31	7
Barcelona B	2014–15	Segunda División	30	8	—		—		—		—		30	8
Barcelona B	Total		61	15	—		—		—		—		61	15
Barcelona	2014–15	La Liga	7	2	2	1	—		3 (Note: Appearances in UEFA Champions League)	1	—		12	4
Barcelona	2015–16	La Liga	10	0	4	3	—		3	0	3 (Note: Two appearances in Supercopa de España, one appearance in FIFA Club World Cup)	0	20	3
Barcelona	Total		17	2	6	4	—		6	1	3	0	32	7
Málaga	2016–17	La Liga	30	14	1	2	—		—		—		31	16
Everton	2017–18	Premier League	8	0	0	0	1	0	6 (Note: Appearances in UEFA Europa League)	1	—		15	1
Everton	2018–19	Premier League	0	0	0	0	1	0	0	0	—		1	0
Everton	2020–21	Premier League	0	0	0	0	0	0	0	0	—		0	0
Everton	Total		8	0	0	0	2	0	6	1	—		16	1
Sevilla (loan)	2017–18	La Liga	13	0	2	0	—		3	0	—		18	0
Real Sociedad (loan)	2018–19	La Liga	24	0	2	0	—		—		—		26	0
Valladolid (loan)	2019–20	La Liga	24	3	2	1	—		—		—		26	4
Huesca	2020–21	La Liga	20	5	0	0	—		—		—		7	2
Getafe (loan)	2021–22	La Liga	29	3	1	1	—		—		—		30	4
Las Palmas (loan)	2022–23	Segunda División	21	7	1	0	—		—		—		22	7
Las Palmas	2023–24	La Liga	27	1	0	0	—		—		—		27	1
Las Palmas	2024–25	La Liga	31	9	1	0	—		—		—		32	9
Las Palmas	Total		79	17	2	0	—		—		—		81	17
Career total			305	59	16	8	2	0	15	2	3	0	341	69

== Honours ==
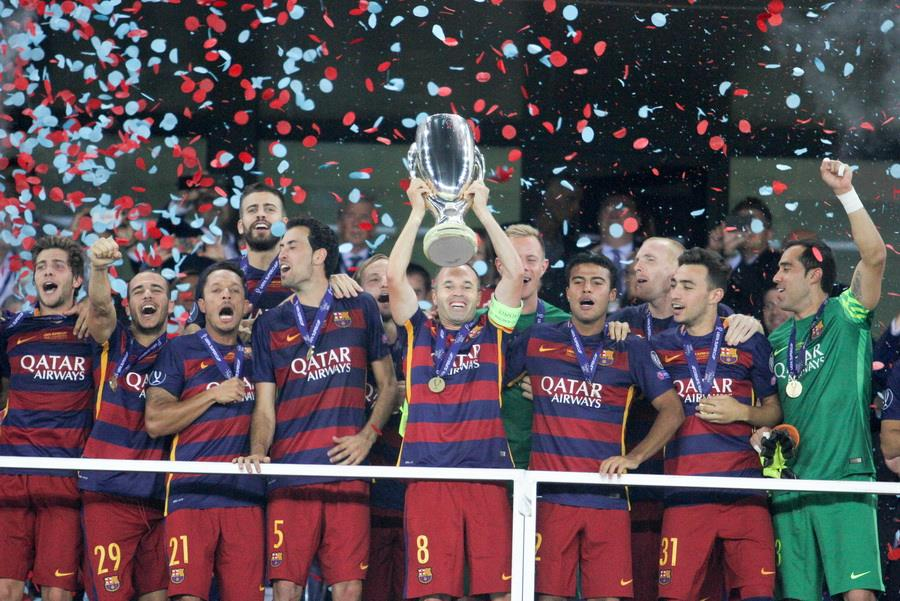
Sandro (second from left) punches the air during the 2015 Super Cup celebrations

Barcelona

- La Liga: 2014–15, 2015–16
- Copa del Rey: 2014–15, 2015–16
- UEFA Champions League: 2014–15
- UEFA Super Cup: 2015
- FIFA Club World Cup: 2015

Spain U21

- UEFA European Under-21 Championship runner-up: 2017
