= Nacho (footballer, born 1955) =

Spanish footballer

Personal information
- Full name: José Ignacio Pérez Frías
- Date of birth: 27 April 1955
- Place of birth: Madrid, Spain
- Date of death: 30 March 2018 (aged 62)
- Place of death: Málaga, Spain
- Height: 1.76 m (5 ft 9 1/2 in)
- Position: Defender

Youth career
- 1969–1973: Puerto Malagueño

Senior career*
Years	Team	Apps	(Gls)
1973–1975	Castilla		
1975–1976	Atlético Malagueño		
1976–1984	Málaga	189	(3)
1984–1985	Avilés	26	(0)
1985–1986	Marbella		
1986–1991	Mijas		

International career
1973	Spain U18	3	(0)
- * Club domestic league appearances and goals

José Ignacio Pérez Frías (27 April 1955 – 30 March 2018), known as Nacho, was a Spanish footballer who played as a defender.

He spent his entire professional career with Málaga, playing 223 competitive matches while appearing in four La Liga seasons.

== Early life ==
Born in Madrid to hotel employee Pedro Pérez and his wife Isabel Frías, Nacho and his ten siblings (eventually the couple fathered 12 children) moved with the family to Málaga at the age of 14.

He started playing football with Puerto Malagueño and Real Madrid Castilla, but suffered an injury while at the service of the latter club and was released shortly after signing.

== Club career ==
Nacho subsequently joined Atlético Malagueño, whilst studying for his medical degree. He made his debut with the first team of Málaga CF on 10 November 1976, coming on as a late substitute in a 3–0 home win against Linares CF in the Copa del Rey. His maiden appearance in La Liga came the following 6 March, also coming from the bench in a 3–1 away loss to Real Zaragoza, and he scored his first in the competition on 26 March of the same year but in another away defeat (2–1, at RC Celta de Vigo).

In 1979, Nacho was appointed team captain. He won two promotions to the top division with his main club, in that year and also in 1982.

Nacho retired in 1991 at the age of 36, after spells in the lower leagues with Real Avilés Industrial CF, CA Marbella and CD Mijas. Later, he worked with Málaga as a youth coach and doctor.

== International career ==
Nacho won three caps for Spain at under-18 level.

== Personal life and death ==
Nacho's brother and son, respectively Juan Carlos and Ignacio, were also footballers. They too played for Málaga.

Nacho died on 30 March 2018, at the age of 62. He was recovering in his Málaga home from severe burns, from which he was tended at the Hospital Regional Universitario Carlos Haya.
