= Juan Carlos (footballer, born 1956) =

Spanish footballer

Personal information
- Full name: Juan Carlos Pérez Frías
- Date of birth: 27 July 1956 (age 70)
- Place of birth: Madrid, Spain
- Height: 1.72 m (5 ft 7 1/2 in)
- Position: Midfielder

Youth career
- 1970–1974: Puerto Malagueño

Senior career*
Years	Team	Apps	(Gls)
1974–1976	Atlético Malagueño		
1976–1985	Málaga	227	(23)
1985–1986	Marbella		
- * Club domestic league appearances and goals

Juan Carlos Pérez Frías (born 27 July 1956), known as Juan Carlos, is a Spanish former professional footballer who played as a midfielder.

== Early life ==
Born in Madrid to hotel employee Pedro Pérez and his wife Isabel Frías, Juan Carlos and his ten siblings (eventually the couple fathered 12 children) moved with the family to Málaga at the age of 14.

== Club career ==
Nacho played for CD Málaga during nine professional seasons, achieving promotions to La Liga in 1979 and 1982. He made his debut in the competition on 26 March 1977 in a 2–1 away loss against RC Celta de Vigo, and scored his first goal the following weekend to help the hosts to defeat Real Sociedad by the same scoreline.

Having been relegated at the end of the 1984–85 campaign, the 29-year-old Juan Carlos left the La Rosaleda Stadium. After retiring, he worked with his brother as the club's doctor.

== Personal life ==
Juan Carlo's brother and nephew, respectively José Ignacio and Ignacio, were also footballers. They too played for Málaga.
