= Juan Carlos (footballer, born 1990) =

Spanish footballer

Juankar
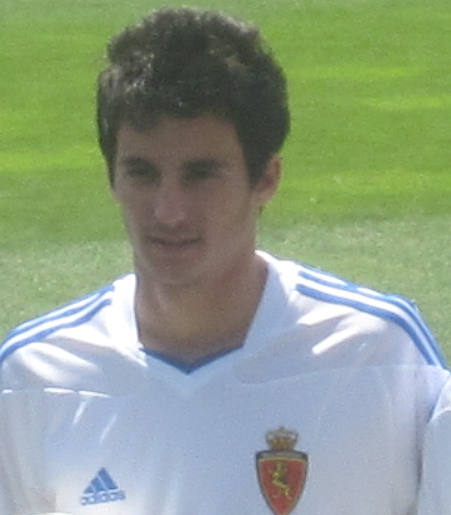
- Juan Carlos presented at Zaragoza

Personal information
- Full name: Juan Carlos Pérez López
- Date of birth: 30 March 1990 (age 36)
- Place of birth: Madrid, Spain
- Height: 1.78 m (5 ft 10 in)
- Positions: Left-back; winger

Youth career
- 1996–2007: EFMO Boadilla
- 2007–2008: Real Madrid

Senior career*
Years	Team	Apps	(Gls)
2008–2009	Real Madrid C		
2009–2011	Real Madrid B	64	(14)
2010	Real Madrid	1	(0)
2011–2017	Braga	0	(0)
2011–2012	→ Zaragoza (loan)	24	(3)
2012–2014	→ Betis (loan)	45	(0)
2014–2015	→ Granada (loan)	21	(0)
2015–2017	→ Málaga (loan)	47	(3)
2017–2020	Málaga	53	(1)
2020–2024	Panathinaikos	106	(3)
2024–2025	Aris	9	(0)

International career
2011	Spain U21	5	(0)
- * Club domestic league appearances and goals as of 08:06, 25 June 2025 (UTC)

Juan Carlos Pérez López (born 30 March 1990), known as Juan Carlos or Juankar, is a Spanish professional footballer who plays mainly as a left-back and occasionally as a left winger.

He was known by the nickname El liebre (Hare), because he is quick on his feet and sensitive to the ears.

== Club career ==
Born in Madrid, Juan Carlos started his football career at the EFMO Boadilla academy, spending 11 years there from the age of six. In 2007, Real Madrid signed him to their youth system.

After two years, Juan Carlos was promoted to Real Madrid Castilla, going on to spend two full Segunda División B seasons with them. His first goal with the reserves came on 8 November 2009, in a 4–2 home win against Gimnástica de Torrelavega. On 28 September 2010, he was called up for a UEFA Champions League group stage match at AJ Auxerre, but eventually did not leave the bench in the 1–0 victory.

On 3 October 2010, Juan Carlos finally made his first appearance for Real's first team, playing 11 minutes in place of Ángel Di María in a 6–1 La Liga home rout of Deportivo de La Coruña. He added 32 games and three goals for the B side, which eventually fell short in the promotion playoffs.

On 7 July 2011, Juan Carlos signed with fellow top-flight club Real Zaragoza from third-party owner Quality Sports Investments, via S.C. Braga. On 22 September, he came on as a second-half substitute in an away fixture against Real Betis with the score at 4–1 for the hosts, and scored two goals in two minutes which eventually amounted to nothing, as the Aragonese lost 4–3.

Juan Carlos was subsequently loaned to Betis, Granada CF and Málaga CF, all in the top division. On 19 July 2017, he joined the latter side on a permanent four-year contract.

During his spell at the La Rosaleda Stadium, Juan Carlos was often hindered by injury problems. On 9 September 2020, the 30-year-old signed a two-year deal with Greek club Panathinaikos F.C. for an undisclosed fee.

== Career statistics ==
As of 25 May 2024

Club	Season	League			Cup		Continental		Total	
Club	Season	Division	Apps	Goals	Apps	Goals	Apps	Goals	Apps	Goals
Real Madrid B	2008–09	Segunda División B	1	0	—		—		1	0
Real Madrid B	2009–10	Segunda División B	29	11	—		—		29	11
Real Madrid B	2010–11	Segunda División B	34	3	—		—		34	3
Real Madrid B	Total		64	14	—		—		64	14
Real Madrid	2010–11	La Liga	1	0	0	0	0	0	1	0
Zaragoza	2011–12	La Liga	24	3	2	0	—		26	3
Betis	2012–13	La Liga	25	0	1	0	—		26	0
Betis	2013–14	La Liga	20	0	2	0	4	0	26	0
Betis	Total		45	0	3	0	4	0	52	0
Granada	2014–15	La Liga	21	0	3	0	—		24	0
Málaga	2015–16	La Liga	19	1	1	0	—		20	1
Málaga	2016–17	La Liga	28	2	1	0	—		29	2
Málaga	2017–18	La Liga	10	0	0	0	—		10	0
Málaga	2018–19	Segunda División	7	1	1	0	—		8	1
Málaga	2019–20	Segunda División	36	0	1	0	—		37	0
Málaga	Total		100	4	4	0	—		104	4
Panathinaikos	2020–21	Super League Greece	24	0	1	0	—		25	0
Panathinaikos	2021–22	Super League Greece	31	2	6	0	—		37	2
Panathinaikos	2022–23	Super League Greece	33	1	3	0	1	0	37	1
Panathinaikos	2023–24	Super League Greece	18	0	3	0	9	0	30	0
Panathinaikos	Total		106	3	13	0	10	0	129	3
Career total			361	24	25	0	14	0	400	24

== Honours ==
Panathinaikos

- Greek Football Cup: 2021–22, 2023–24

Individual

- Super League Greece Team of the Season: 2021–22
