= Beñat Etxebarria =

Spanish footballer (born 1987)

Beñat
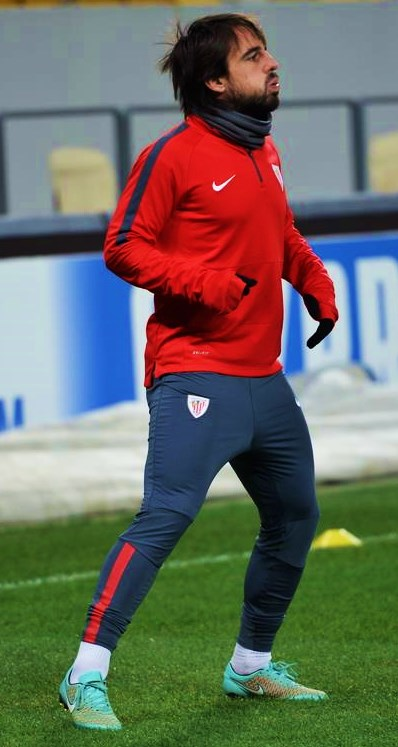
- Beñat with Athletic Bilbao in 2014

Personal information
- Full name: Beñat Etxebarria Urkiaga
- Date of birth: 19 February 1987 (age 39)
- Place of birth: Igorre, Spain
- Height: 1.76 m (5 ft 9 in)
- Position: Central midfielder

Youth career
- 1997–1998: Arratia
- 1998–2005: Athletic Bilbao

Senior career*
Years	Team	Apps	(Gls)
2005–2006	Basconia	21	(3)
2006–2008	Bilbao Athletic	75	(5)
2006–2009	Athletic Bilbao	1	(0)
2008–2009	→ Conquense (loan)	34	(6)
2009–2010	Betis B	34	(3)
2010–2013	Betis	105	(14)
2013–2020	Athletic Bilbao	181	(6)
2020–2021	Macarthur	22	(1)
Total		473	(38)

International career
2004–2005	Spain U17	5	(0)
2012	Spain	4	(0)
2011–2014	Basque Country	4	(0)
- * Club domestic league appearances and goals

Beñat Etxebarria Urkiaga (Basque: [beɲat etʃeβari.a uɾki.aɣa], Spanish: [beˈɲat etʃeβaˈri.a wɾˈkjaɣa]; born 19 February 1987), known mononymously as Beñat, is a Spanish former professional footballer who played as a central midfielder.

He spent the better part of his professional career with Athletic Bilbao, appearing in 242 competitive matches and scoring 11 goals while winning the 2015 Supercopa de España. In La Liga, he also represented Betis.

Beñat earned four caps for the Spain national team.

== Club career ==
=== Athletic Bilbao ===
Beñat was born in Igorre, Biscay. Coming through Athletic Bilbao's prolific youth ranks at Lezama, he played his first three years with both the third team, CD Basconia, and the reserve side.

On 29 October 2006, he appeared in his first – and only – La Liga game, which consisted of six minutes against CA Osasuna in a 1–1 away draw after replacing another youth product, Francisco Yeste.

=== Betis ===
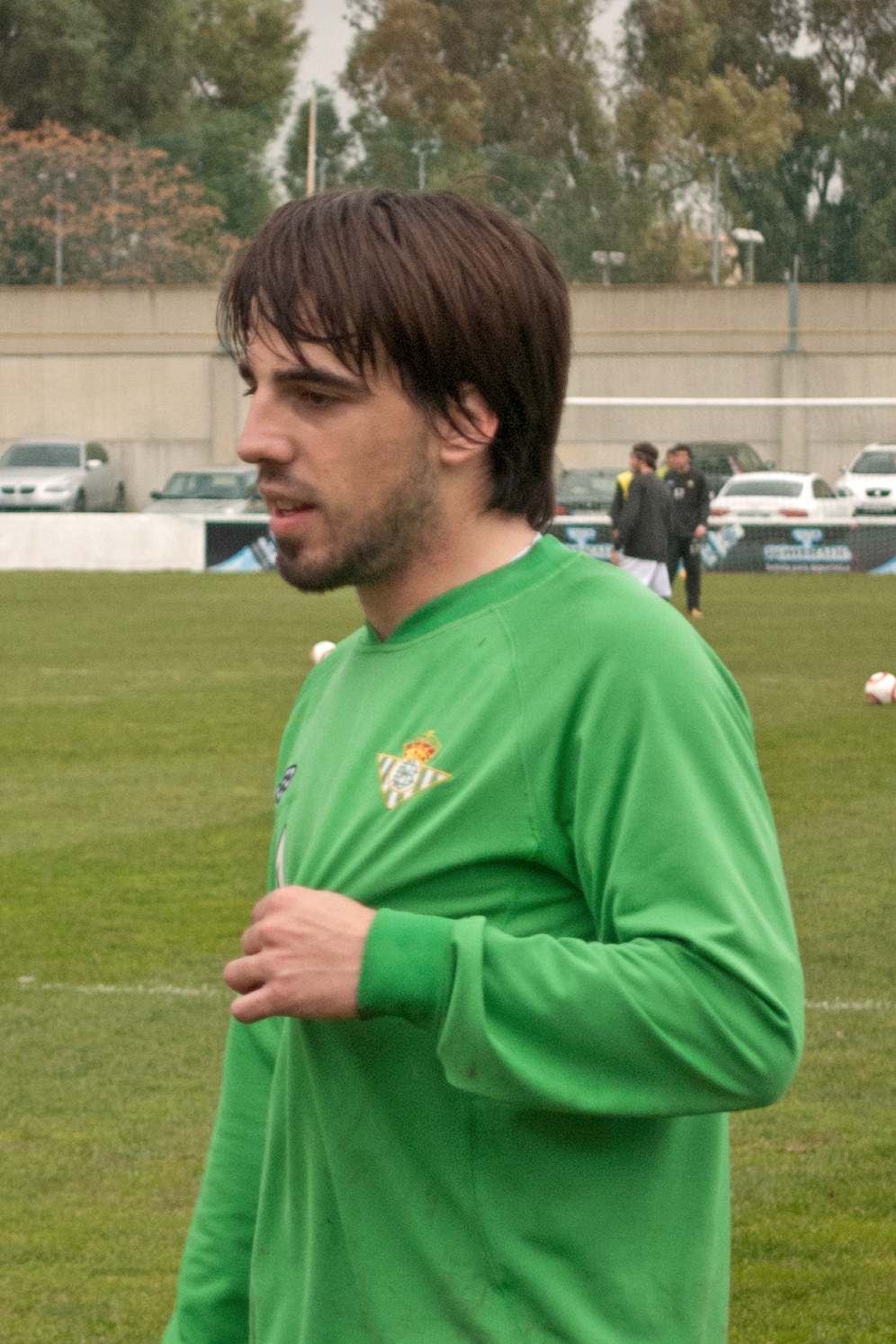
Etxebarria training with Betis in 2010

In 2008–09, Beñat played with UB Conquense in the Segunda División B, after which he was released by Athletic. In the summer he signed with Real Betis, but spent his first season with the reserves also in the third tier.

Beñat made his debut for Betis' main squad on 29 August 2010, playing 20 minutes in the 4–1 home win against Granada CF and being involved in the play that led to Salva Sevilla's goal. Three days later he scored in his first start, a 2–1 home victory over UD Salamanca in the Copa del Rey. In the league campaign he contributed 36 matches (30 starts, 2.521 minutes of action) as the Andalusians returned to the top flight after three years, netting four times.

On 2 May 2012, Beñat scored twice for his fifth and sixth goals of the season, in a 2–1 defeat of Sevilla FC in the local derby. The winner came in the 90th minute.

Beñat scored the game's only goal in a 1–0 home win over Real Madrid on 24 November 2012, with a shot from outside the 18-yard box in the 17th minute. He finished the campaign with 34 games, four goals and seven assists, helping the club finish seventh and qualify for the UEFA Europa League.

=== Athletic return ===
Beñat returned to Athletic Bilbao in June 2013, signing a five-year contract for a reported fee of €8 million. On 16 September, he took the first touch at the new San Mamés Stadium against RC Celta de Vigo and scored the 3–2 winner; he was substituted to a standing ovation, and dedicated his performance to his grandparents.

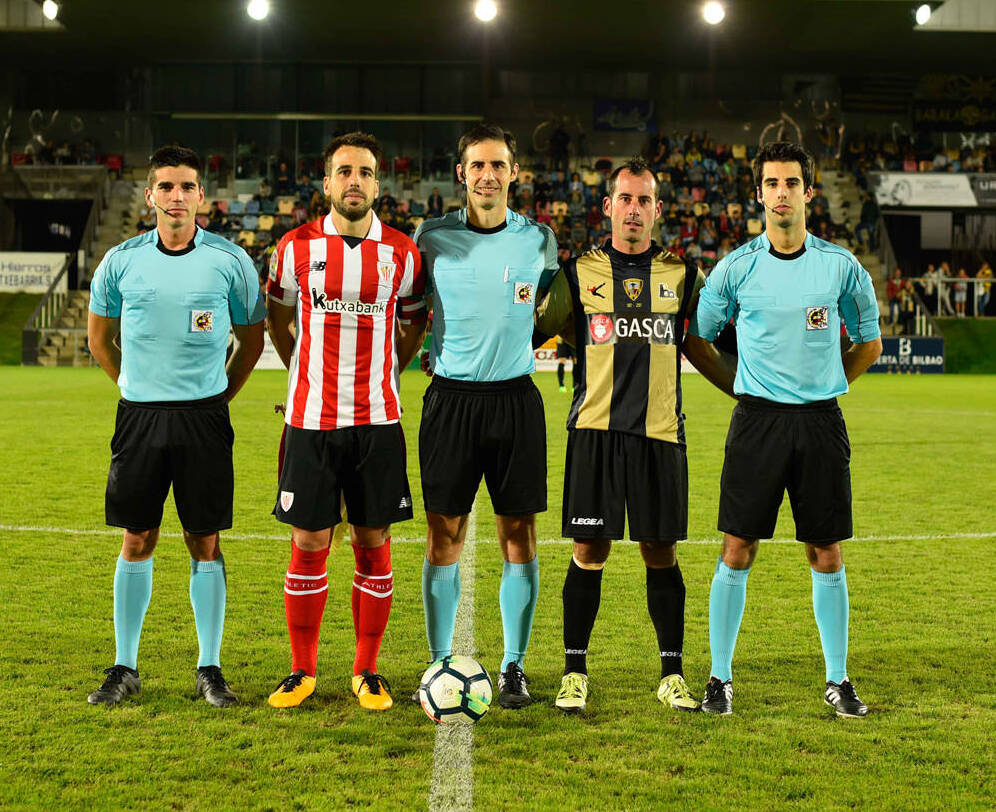
Beñat acting as captain of Athletic alongside Alain Arroyo of Barakaldo, prior to a friendly as part of their centenary event in October 2017

On 14 April 2016, Beñat was the only player to miss in a penalty shootout against compatriots Sevilla in the quarter-finals of the Europa League. Following the appointment of manager José Ángel Ziganda for the 2017–18 season, he began featuring less regularly.

In July 2020, Athletic confirmed that Beñat's contract would not be extended beyond that summer, although the departure was delayed beyond its usual June expiry after the season was postponed due to the COVID-19 pandemic in Spain. His contribution (along with long-serving colleague Mikel San José, also leaving in similar circumstances) was acknowledged at the last home fixture on 16 July 2020 in an empty San Mamés– he was in the matchday squad but did not leave the bench, with his last appearance five months earlier; he had been involved in the side's run to the Spanish Cup final, but the circumstances of the delay and the end of his spell at the club meant he would have no opportunity to take part in the decisive match.

=== Macarthur ===
Beñat moved abroad for the first time at the age of 33, joining Australian A-League newcomers Macarthur FC on 13 November 2020. On 30 December, he scored their first-ever goal in the competition, through a deflected free kick in the 1–0 away defeat of Western Sydney Wanderers FC.

Both Beñat and his compatriot and former Athletic teammate Markel Susaeta retired at the end of the campaign, aged 34.

== International career ==
Beñat played for Spain at under-17 level; due to poor school grades, his parents did not allow him to be selected for the 2004 UEFA European Championship. He made his debut for the full side on 26 May 2012, playing 45 minutes in a 2–0 friendly win with Serbia in St. Gallen and thus becoming the first Betis player to don the national team shirt since Juanito nearly four years earlier.

== Career statistics ==
=== Club ===
Appearances and goals by club, season and competition
Club	Season	League			Cup		Continental		Other		Total	
Club	Season	Division	Apps	Goals	Apps	Goals	Apps	Goals	Apps	Goals	Apps	Goals
Bilbao Athletic	2005–06	Segunda División B	16	0	—		—		—		16	0
Bilbao Athletic	2006–07	Segunda División B	29	3	—		—		—		29	3
Bilbao Athletic	2007–08	Segunda División B	30	2	—		—		—		30	2
Bilbao Athletic	Total		75	5	—		—		—		75	5
Athletic Bilbao	2006–07	La Liga	1	0	—		—		—		1	0
Conquense (loan)	2008–09	Segunda División B	34	6	1	1	—		—		35	7
Betis B	2009–10	Segunda División B	34	3	—		—		—		34	3
Betis	2010–11	Segunda División	36	4	6	1	—		—		42	5
Betis	2011–12	La Liga	35	6	1	0	—		—		36	6
Betis	2012–13	La Liga	34	4	6	0	—		—		40	4
Betis	Total		105	14	13	1	—		—		118	15
Athletic Bilbao	2013–14	La Liga	23	1	4	0	—		—		27	1
Athletic Bilbao	2014–15	La Liga	28	2	7	0	9 (Note: Appearances in UEFA Europa League and UEFA Champions League)	0	—		44	2
Athletic Bilbao	2015–16	La Liga	36	1	5	0	12 (Note: Appearances in UEFA Europa League)	2	2 (Note: Appearances in Supercopa de España)	0	55	3
Athletic Bilbao	2016–17	La Liga	32	1	1	0	6	1	0	0	39	2
Athletic Bilbao	2017–18	La Liga	24	0	1	0	8	0	0	0	33	0
Athletic Bilbao	2018–19	La Liga	27	1	2	1	–		–		29	2
Athletic Bilbao	2019–20	La Liga	11	0	3	1	–		–		14	1
Athletic Bilbao	Total		181	6	23	2	35	3	2	0	241	11
Macarthur	2020–21	A-League	22	1	0	0	—		2	0	24	1
Career total			452	35	37	4	35	3	4	0	528	42

=== International ===
Appearances and goals by national team and year
National team	Year	Apps	Goals
Spain	2012	4	0
Total		4	0

== Honours ==
Betis

- Segunda División: 2010–11

Athletic Bilbao

- Supercopa de España: 2015
