= Juanma (footballer, born 1981) =

Spanish footballer

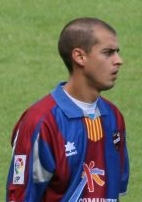
- Juanma with Levante in 2007

Personal information
- Full name: Juan Manuel Gómez Sánchez
- Date of birth: 29 May 1981 (age 45)
- Place of birth: Don Benito, Spain
- Height: 1.76 m (5 ft 9 in)
- Position: Midfielder

Youth career
- 1992–1997: Don Benito

Senior career*
Years	Team	Apps	(Gls)
1997–1999	Don Benito	28	(4)
1999–2004	Málaga B	82	(10)
2001	Málaga	0	(0)
2001	→ Don Benito (loan)	5	(0)
2004–2008	Levante	82	(7)
2006–2007	→ Recreativo (loan)	27	(2)
2008–2012	Betis	86	(5)
2013	Villarreal	5	(0)
2013–2015	Alavés	48	(3)
Total		363	(31)
- * Club domestic league appearances and goals

Juan Manuel Gómez Sánchez (born 29 May 1981), known as Juanma, is a Spanish former professional footballer who played as a right midfielder.

== Club career ==
Juanma was born in Don Benito, Province of Badajoz. He represented Málaga CF during his early career, playing with both its first and second teams. In summer 2004 he joined Levante UD for four years, making his La Liga debut on 26 September in a 4–3 away loss against Real Zaragoza; he would finish the season with five goals, but the side was relegated.

After a loan stint with Recreativo de Huelva, Juanma returned to the Valencian Community club, in another relegation-ending campaign. On 6 August 2008, he moved to Real Betis on a four-year contract for roughly €1 million, scoring his first goal for the Andalusians on 29 October in the 2–0 away victory over CD Castellón in the round of 32 of the Copa del Rey. He netted twice in 27 games in the domestic league, against Valencia CF (3–2 away defeat) and Getafe CF (2–2 home draw), but dropped down a division for the third time in four years.

Following an unassuming five-month spell at Villarreal CF, the 32-year-old Juanma signed a one-year deal with Deportivo Alavés in August 2013, retiring at the end of two Segunda División seasons and 54 competitive matches. He subsequently worked as a youth coach with CD Ariznabarra.

== Honours ==
Betis

- Segunda División: 2010–11
