= Iriney =

Brazilian footballer (born 1981)

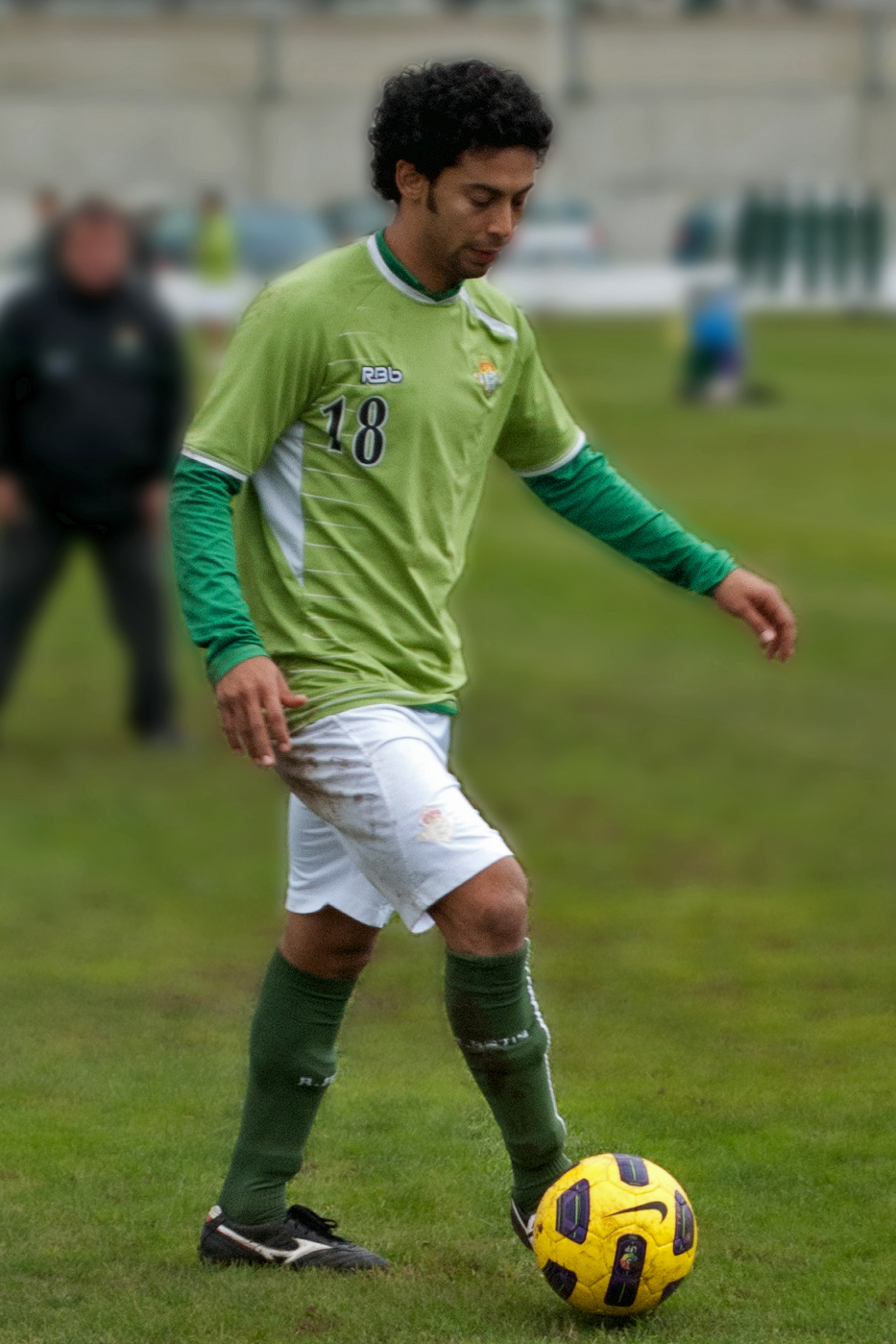
- Iriney training with Betis in 2010

Personal information
- Full name: Iriney Santos da Silva
- Date of birth: 23 April 1981 (age 45)
- Place of birth: Humaitá, Brazil
- Height: 1.79 m (5 ft 10 in)
- Position: Midfielder

Senior career*
Years	Team	Apps	(Gls)
1998–1999	Nacional Manaus		
1999–2000	Manauense		
2000–2002	São Caetano	26	(0)
2003–2005	Rayo Vallecano	86	(1)
2005–2007	Celta	55	(2)
2008–2009	Almería	26	(0)
2009–2012	Betis	100	(3)
2012–2013	Granada	25	(0)
2013–2014	Watford	15	(0)
2014	→ Mallorca (loan)	11	(0)
Total		344	(6)
- * Club domestic league appearances and goals

Iriney Santos da Silva (born 23 April 1981), known simply as Iriney, is a Brazilian former professional footballer who played as a central midfielder.

He also held a Spanish passport, having spent more than a decade playing in the country, mainly with Rayo Vallecano and Betis (three years apiece). He amassed La Liga totals of 151 matches and two goals during seven seasons, with Rayo, Celta, Almería, Betis and Granada.

== Football career ==
Born in Humaitá, Amazonas, Iriney made his professional debut with Associação Desportiva São Caetano in 2000, and moved to Spain with Rayo Vallecano three years later. First-choice since his beginnings with the Madrid side, he did saw them drop two consecutive divisions; he made his La Liga debut on 23 February 2003, playing the full 90 minutes in a 0–4 home loss against Valencia CF.

In the summer of 2005, Iriney joined RC Celta de Vigo, being one of the Galicians' most consistent players during his two-season spell in the top level. Following the 2007 relegation he decided to leave, but was unable to find a new team due to a lengthy judicial battle until the 2008 January transfer window, when he signed with UD Almería.

Subsequently, after gaining match practice, Iriney was relatively used during his stay in Andalusia, with Almería consecutively retaining their top flight status. In late June 2009 his contract expired and he moved to neighbours Real Betis, freshly relegated to the second level. He contributed with 36 matches – 35 starts – and three goals in his second season as they returned to the main division as champions and, on 25 February 2012, played his 100th official match with the Verdiblancos, against Getafe CF.

After repeatedly refusing to renew his contract, Iriney joined neighbouring Granada CF also in the first division, signing for three years as a free agent. After only one, however, he moved sides again, agreeing to a two-year deal with Watford for an undisclosed fee.

Iriney made his debut in the League Championship on 3 August 2013, starting and finishing the 1–0 win at Birmingham City. On 31 January of the following year, he returned to Spain after being loaned to division two's RCD Mallorca until the end of the season.
