= Paulão (footballer, born 1982) =

Brazilian footballer

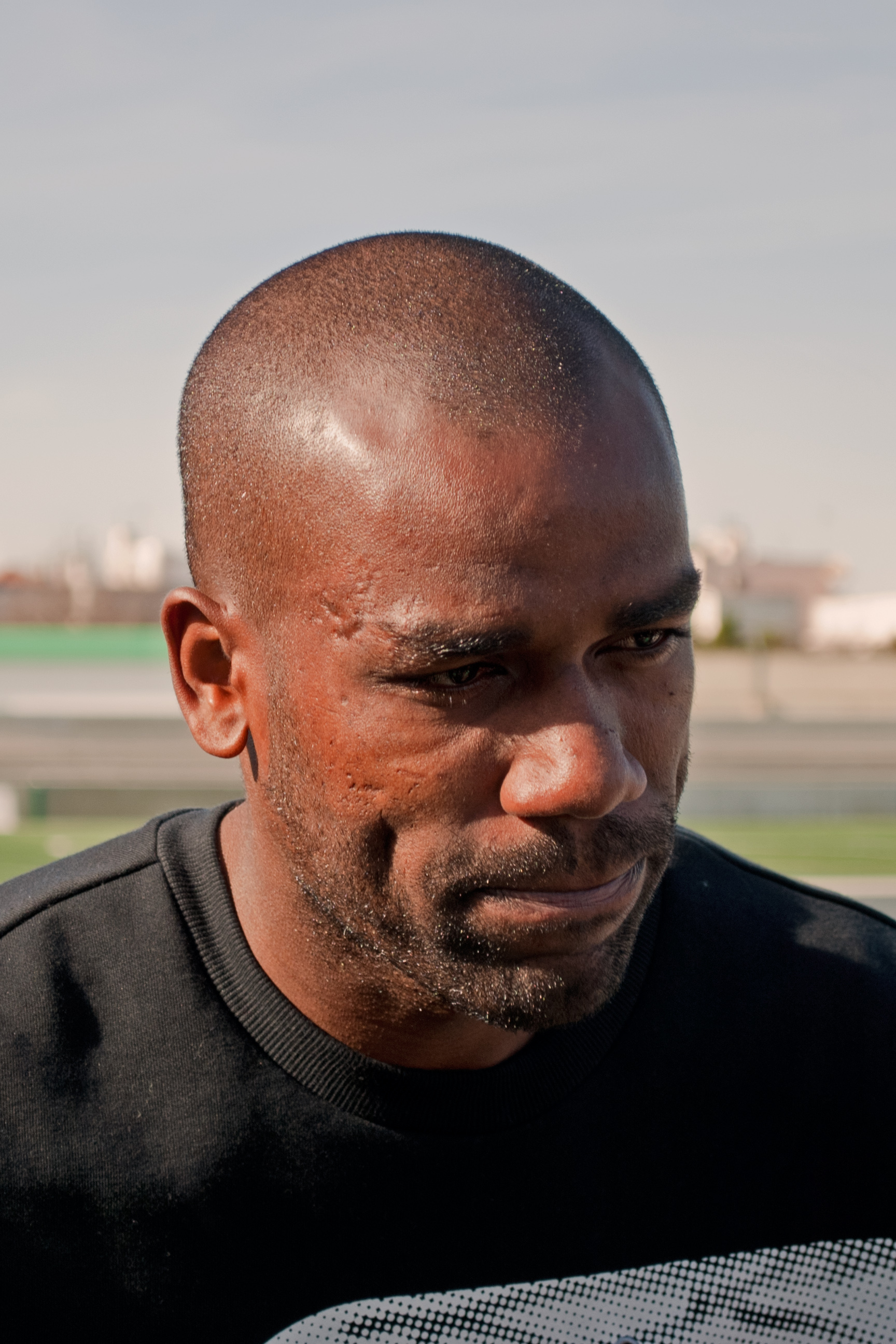

Personal information
- Full name: Paulo Afonso Santos Júnior
- Date of birth: 6 May 1982 (age 44)
- Place of birth: Lagoa Santa, Brazil
- Height: 1.88 m (6 ft 2 in)
- Position: Centre back

Youth career
- Atlético Mineiro

Senior career*
Years	Team	Apps	(Gls)
2002–2004	Atlético Mineiro		
2005	América-MG		
2006	Gama	11	(0)
2006–2010	Naval	84	(6)
2010–2011	Braga	26	(3)
2011–2012	Saint-Étienne	10	(1)
2012	→ Betis (loan)	17	(0)
2012–2014	Betis	42	(2)
2015	Atlético San Luis	10	(2)
2017	Olhanense	6	(1)
- * Club domestic league appearances and goals

Paulo Afonso Santos Júnior (born 6 May 1982), known as Paulão, is a Brazilian former professional footballer who played as a central defender.

== Football career ==
Born in Lagoa Santa, Minas Gerais, Paulão started playing with local Clube Atlético Mineiro, moving to neighbouring América Futebol Clube after three seasons. In 2006, he competed with Sociedade Esportiva do Gama in the Série B.

In the 2006 European off-season, Paulão moved to Portugal and signed for Associação Naval 1º de Maio, being an undisputed starter from the beginning and scoring six Primeira Liga goals in his last two years combined. He made his debut in the competition on 10 September 2006, playing the full 90 minutes in a 2–1 away win against Académica de Coimbra.

For the 2009–10 campaign, Paulão continued in the country and joined S.C. Braga as a free agent. He only played in seven league games in his first year, but made 34 official appearances in the following for the Minho club (three goals), including seven in its runner-up run in the UEFA Europa League.

In the summer of 2011, Paulão signed with AS Saint-Étienne in France on a free transfer. In the following transfer window, he joined Real Betis on loan.

Paulão netted two times in 22 matches in his first full season in La Liga, helping the Andalusians finish seventh and qualify for the Europa League. On 20 April 2014, just 30 minutes into an away fixture against Rayo Vallecano, he asked to be substituted after making two mistakes – this included an own goal – that cost Betis two goals in a 1–3 defeat that made their relegation almost certain, which eventually happened.
