= Javi Chica =

Spanish footballer

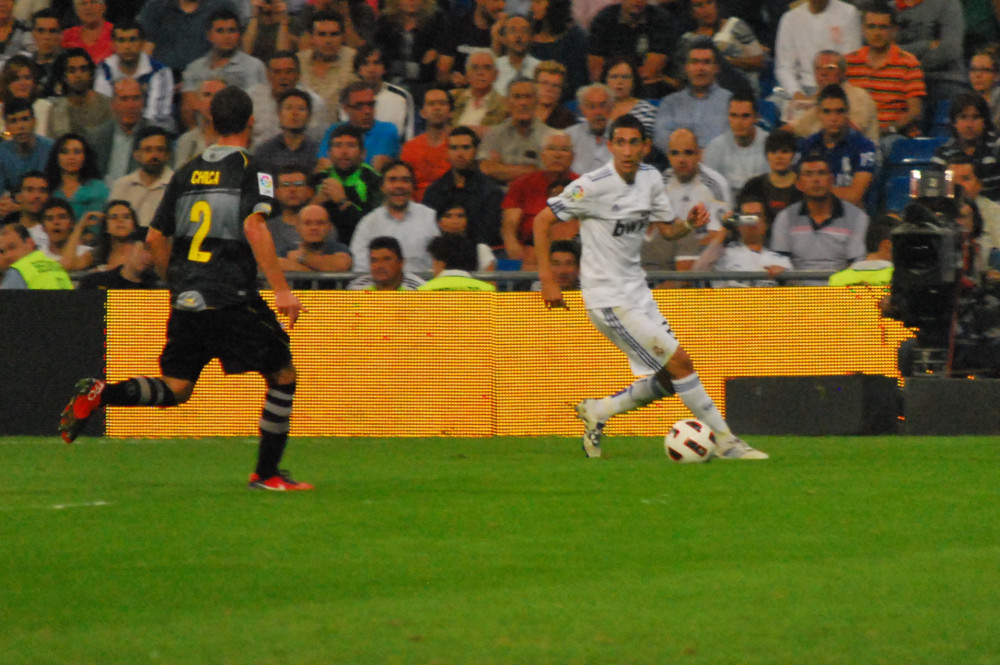
- Chica (left) in action for Espanyol in 2010

Personal information
- Full name: Francisco Javier Chica Torres
- Date of birth: 17 May 1985 (age 41)
- Place of birth: Barcelona, Spain
- Height: 1.76 m (5 ft 9 in)
- Position: Full-back

Youth career
- Martinenc
- 1996–2004: Espanyol

Senior career*
Years	Team	Apps	(Gls)
2003–2006	Espanyol B	48	(0)
2006–2011	Espanyol	117	(0)
2011–2014	Betis	62	(2)
2014–2016	Valladolid	58	(0)
2017–2018	Llagostera	45	(0)
2018–2019	Grama	31	(0)
Total		361	(2)

International career
2003	Spain U17	1	(0)
2004	Spain U19	5	(0)
2005	Spain U20	1	(0)

Managerial career
- 2020–2024: Espanyol (youth)
- 2024: Espanyol B
- 2024–2025: Espanyol (youth)
- * Club domestic league appearances and goals

Francisco Javier "Javi" Chica Torres (born 17 May 1985) is a Spanish former professional footballer. Capable of appearing at either right or left-back, his main asset was his physical strength.

He spent the better part of his professional career with Espanyol, appearing in 136 competitive matches over a five-year spell. In La Liga, he also represented Betis.

== Club career ==
=== Espanyol ===
Born in Barcelona, Catalonia, Chica was a product of RCD Espanyol's youth system. He made his first-team debut on 15 October 2006 in a 0–0 away draw against Villarreal CF, and appeared in 27 La Liga games in his first year, adding ten as the club went all the way to the final of the UEFA Cup, losing it to fellow Spaniards Sevilla FC (he did not play the decisive match itself).

Never an undisputed starter in the following seasons, Chica continued to be regularly used at Espanyol, featuring in an average of more than 20 matches per season as either a right or left-back.

=== Betis ===
In late May 2011, free agent Chica signed a four-year contract with Real Betis, recently returned to the top division. He made his official debut on 27 August, starting at right-back in a 1–0 away win against Granada CF.

Chica scored his first goal as a senior on 20 April 2014, but it happened in a 3–1 loss at Rayo Vallecano; the Andalusians also suffered relegation at the end of the campaign after finishing last.

=== Valladolid ===
On 9 July 2014, despite having still one year left on his Betis contract, Chica agreed to a two-year deal with Real Valladolid, also in the Segunda División. He totalled 60 games during his stint at the Estadio José Zorrilla.

=== Later career ===
Chica returned to his native region in January 2017, joining Segunda División B side UE Llagostera. Before retiring in 2019 at the age of 34, he spent one year with amateurs FE Grama.

In summer 2020, Chica returned to Espanyol as youth coach.

== Honours ==
Espanyol

- UEFA Cup runner-up: 2006–07

Spain U19

- UEFA European Under-19 Championship: 2004
