= Nacho (footballer, born 1980) =

Spanish footballer

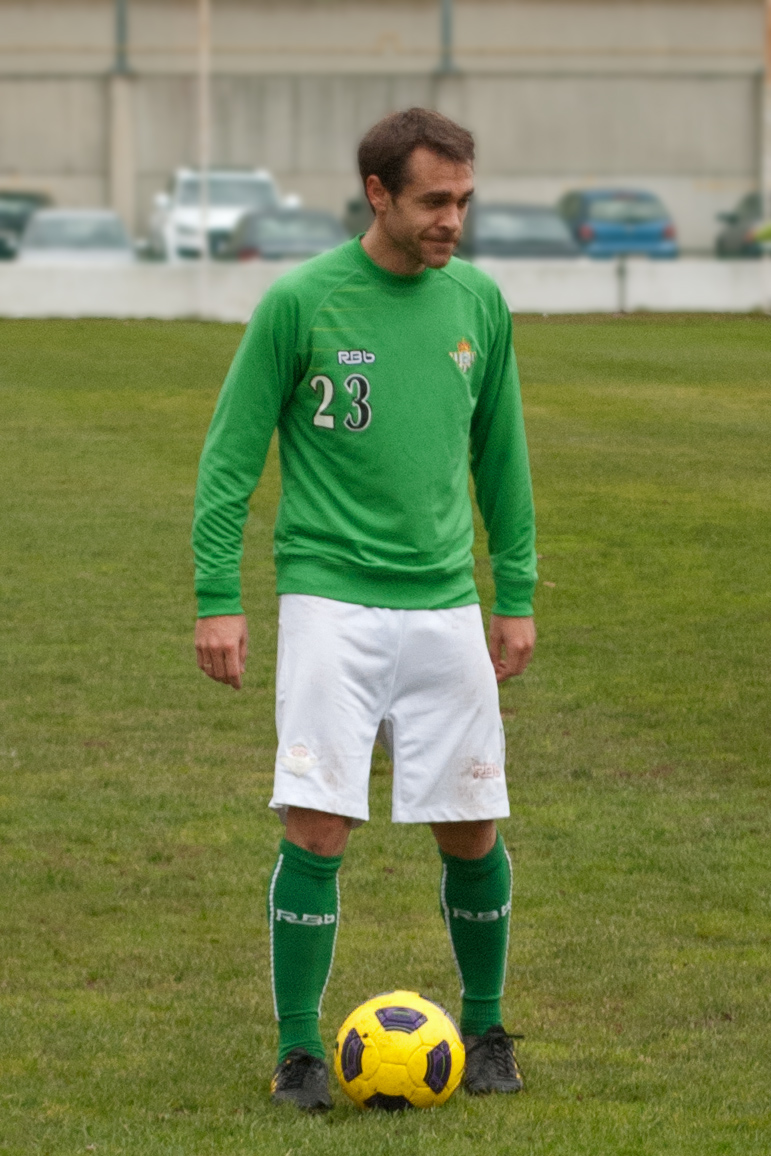
- Nacho training with Betis in 2010

Personal information
- Full name: Ignacio Pérez Santamaría
- Date of birth: 24 June 1980 (age 46)
- Place of birth: Málaga, Spain
- Height: 1.78 m (5 ft 10 in)
- Position: Left-back

Youth career
- Málaga

Senior career*
Years	Team	Apps	(Gls)
1999–2004	Málaga B	112	(17)
2002–2006	Málaga	36	(3)
2004–2005	→ Levante (loan)	27	(4)
2006–2009	Getafe	40	(4)
2008	→ Real Sociedad (loan)	16	(1)
2008–2009	→ Málaga (loan)	34	(1)
2009–2014	Betis	150	(1)
Total		415	(31)

Managerial career
- 2021–2022: Antequera
- 2023–2024: El Palo
- * Club domestic league appearances and goals

Ignacio Pérez Santamaría (born 24 June 1980), known as Nacho, is a Spanish former professional footballer who played mainly as a left-back (he could also operate as a left midfielder).

He appeared in 220 La Liga games over nine seasons, totalling 13 goals for Málaga (two spells), Levante, Getafe and Betis. He added 124 matches and three goals in the Segunda División.

== Club career ==
A product of Málaga CF's youth system, Nacho was born in Málaga, and he made his first-team debut on 23 February 2003 in a 1–1 La Liga home draw against RC Celta de Vigo. He went on to play four seasons with the Andalusians, with a loan to Levante UD in the same league in between.

In June 2006, upon Málaga's top-division relegation, Nacho signed a four-year contract with Madrid's Getafe CF. Scarcely used during his second season, he would be loaned in January 2008 to Real Sociedad as the Basques ultimately failed to return from Segunda División, with the player appearing in 16 matches – 13 as a starter.

Nacho was loaned again for the 2008–09 campaign, rejoining his former side Málaga. Mainly used as a substitute, he scored his first goal in his second spell in a 3–1 away win over Real Valladolid on 22 February 2009, helping them to finish eighth immediately after promoting.

On 28 August 2009, Nacho moved to Real Betis of the second tier on a three-year deal. For most of his stint he was used as an attacking left-back, and played 34 games in his second year as the Verdiblancos returned to the top division after two years.

== Personal life ==
Nacho's father and uncle, respectively, José Ignacio and Juan Carlos, also played for Málaga. His brother Perico appeared for the club's reserves.

== Honours ==
Betis

- Segunda División: 2010–11
