= 2018–19 RCD Espanyol season =

RCD Espanyol
2018–19 season
- President: Chen Yansheng
- Head coach: Rubi
- Stadium: Cornellà-El Prat
- La Liga: 7th
- Copa del Rey: Quarter-finals
- Top goalscorer: League: Borja Iglesias (17); All: Borja Iglesias (20)
Home colours	Away colours	Third colours

The 2018–19 season was the 84th season in La Liga played by RCD Espanyol, a Spanish football club based in Barcelona, Catalonia. It covers a period from 1 July 2018 to 30 June 2019.

== First team squad ==
As of 10 February 2018

No.	Name	Nat.	Place of Birth	Date of birth (age)	Joined	Signed from	Transfer Fee	Ends
Goalkeepers
1	Roberto	(Spain)	(Community of Madrid) Madrid	10 February 1986 (age 40)	2016	(Greece) Olympiacos	€3,000,000	2019
13	Diego López	(Spain)	(Galicia (Spain)) Paradela	3 November 1981 (age 44)	2016	(Italy) Milan	Free	2020
Defenders
5	Naldo	(Brazil) (Italy)	(Brazil) Santo André	10 January 1988 (age 38)	2017	(Mexico) Querétaro	€2,500,000	2020
6	Óscar Duarte	(Costa Rica) (Nicaragua)	(Nicaragua) Catarina	3 June 1989 (age 37)	2016	(Belgium) Club Brugge	€1,150,000	2019
8	Roberto Rosales	(Venezuela)	(Venezuela) Caracas	20 November 1988 (age 37)	2018	Málaga	Loan	2019
12	Dídac Vilà	(Spain)	(Catalonia) Mataró	9 June 1989 (age 37)	2017	(Greece) AEK Athens	€250,000	2020
16	Javi López	(Spain)	(Andalusia) Osuna	21 January 1986 (age 40)	2006	Espanyol B	Free	2019
22	Mario Hermoso	(Spain)	(Community of Madrid) Madrid	18 June 1995 (age 31)	2017	Real Madrid Castilla	€400,000	2020
Midfielders
4	Víctor Sánchez	(Spain)	(Catalonia) Terrassa	8 September 1987 (age 39)	2012	(Switzerland) Neuchâtel Xamax	Free	2021
10	Sergi Darder	(Spain)	(Balearic Islands) Artà	22 December 1993 (age 32)	2017	(France) Lyon	€8,000,000	2023
14	Óscar Melendo	(Spain)	(Catalonia) Barcelona	23 August 1997 (age 29)	2003	Espanyol B	Free	2022
15	David López	(Spain)	(Catalonia) Barcelona	9 October 1989 (age 36)	2016	(Italy) Napoli	€4,000,000	2023
18	Álex Lopez	(Spain)	(Catalonia) Terrassa	2 June 1997 (age 29)		Espanyol B	Free	2022
21	Marc Roca	(Spain)	(Catalonia) Vilafranca del Penedès	26 November 1996 (age 29)	2008	Espanyol B	Free	2022
23	Esteban Granero	(Spain)	(Community of Madrid) Madrid	2 July 1987 (age 39)	2017	Real Sociedad	Free	2020
Forwards
7	Borja Iglesias	(Spain)	(Galicia (Spain)) Compostela	17 January 1993 (age 33)	2018	Celta	€10,000,000	2022
9	Sergio García	(Spain)	(Catalonia) Barcelona	9 June 1983 (age 43)	2017	(Qatar) Al-Rayyan	Free	2019
11	Facundo Ferreyra	(Argentina)	(Argentina) Lomas de Zamora	14 March 1991 (age 35)	2019	(Portugal) Benfica	loan	2019
17	Hernán Pérez	(Paraguay) (Spain)	(Paraguay) Fernando de la Mora	25 February 1989 (age 37)	2015	Villarreal	Undisclosed	2020
19	Pablo Piatti	(Argentina) (Italy)	(Argentina) Ucacha	31 March 1989 (age 37)	2016	Valencia	€1,300,000	2020
20	Javi Puado	(Spain)	(Catalonia) Barcelona	25 May 1998 (age 28)	2014	Espanyol B	Free	2022
24	Wu Lei	(China)	Nanjing	19 November 1991 (age 34)	2019	(China) Shanghai SIPG	€2,000,000	2022

== Transfers ==
=== In ===
No.	Pos.	Nat.	Name	Age	EU	Moving from	Type	Transfer window	Ends	Transfer fee	Source
17	FW	(Paraguay)	Hernán Pérez	29	EU	Alavés	Loan Return	Summer	2020		
1	GK	(Spain)	Roberto	32	EU	Málaga	Loan Return	Summer	2019		
8	FW	(Spain)	Álvaro Vázquez	27	EU	Gimnàstic	Loan Return	Summer	2020		
24	DF	(Spain)	Sergio Sánchez	32	EU	(Russia) Rubin Kazan	Transfer	Summer	2019	Free	Marca
10	MF	(Spain)	Sergi Darder	24	EU	(France) Lyon	Transfer	Summer	2023	€8,000,000	Marca
18	MF	(Spain)	Álex López	21	EU	Espanyol B	Promoted	Summer	2022	Youth system	Marca
2	DF	(Spain)	Pipa	20	EU	Espanyol B	Promoted	Summer	2022	Youth system	Marca
20	FW	(Spain)	Javi Puado	20	EU	Espanyol B	Promoted	Summer	2022	Youth system	Marca
7	FW	(Spain)	Borja Iglesias	25	EU	Celta Vigo	Transfer	Summer	2022	€10,000,000	RCDEspanyol.com
8	DF	(Venezuela)	Roberto Rosales	29	Non-EU	Málaga	Loan	Summer	2019	Free	RCDEspanyol.com
24	FW	(China)	Wu Lei	27	Non-EU	(China) Shanghai SIPG	Transfer	Summer	2022	€2 million	RCDEspanyol.com

▼ Total Spending: €18,000,000

=== Out ===
No.	Pos.	Nat.	Name	Age	EU	Moving to	Type	Transfer window	Transfer fee	Source
25	MF	(Spain)	Sergi Darder	24	EU	(France) Lyon	Loan Return	Summer		
8	MF	(Colombia)	Carlos Sánchez	32	Non-EU	(Italy) Fiorentina	Loan return	Summer		
24	DF	(Spain)	Sergio Sánchez	32	EU	(Russia) Rubin Kazan	Loan Return	Summer		
7	FW	(Spain)	Gerard	26	EU	Villarreal	Transfer	Summer	€20,000,000	VillarrealCF.es
2	DF	(Spain)	Marc Navarro	22	EU	(England) Watford	Transfer	Summer	€2,000,000	WatfordFC.com
10	MF	(Spain)	José Manuel Jurado	32	EU	(Saudi Arabia) Al-Ahli	Transfer	Summer	Free	Al-Ahli FC Twitter
1	GK	(Spain)	Pau López	23	EU	Real Betis	Transfer	Summer	Free	RealBetisBalompie.es
	FW	(Spain)	Jairo Morillas	25	EU	(Japan) V-Varen Nagasaki	Transfer	Summer	Free	V-Varen.com
3	DF	(Spain)	Aarón Martín	21	EU	(Germany) Mainz 05	Loan	Summer	€3,000,000	Mainz05.de
8	FW	(Spain)	Álvaro Vázquez	27	EU	Real Zaragoza	Loan	Summer	Free	RealZaragoza.com
24	DF	(Spain)	Sergio Sánchez	32	EU	Unattached	Contract Termination	Summer		RCDEspanyol.com

▲ Total Income: €25,000,000

Net Income: ▲€7,000,000

== Pre-season and friendlies ==
Win Draw Loss Fixtures

19 July 2018 Friendly	Olot	1–2	Espanyol	Olot
19:30 CEST	Aspar 9'	Report	Melendo 24'; Baptistão 47'	Stadium: Municipal; Attendance: 2,171; Referee: Alejandro José Hernández Hernández

25 July 2018 Friendly	Richmond Kickers	2–4	Espanyol	Richmond, United States
19:00 EDT	Shanosky 9'; Troyer 42'	Report	Iglesias 37'; Puado 83', 90+1'; Darder 86'	Stadium: City Stadium; Attendance: 7,356; Referee: JC Griggs

28 July 2018 Friendly	FC Cincinnati	2–3	Espanyol	Cincinnati, United States
19:30 EDT	Cicerone 5'; Ledesma 76'	Report	Sánchez 30'; García 70'; Darder 78'	Stadium: Nippert Stadium; Attendance: 16,135; Referee: Brandon Artis

5 August 2018 Friendly	Burnley	0–2	Espanyol	Burnley, England
13:30 WEST		Report	Vilà 49'; Darder 86'	Stadium: Turf Moor; Attendance: 7,000; Referee: Lee Mason

8 August 2018 Friendly	Gimnàstic	0–2	Espanyol	Tarragona
20:30 CEST		Report	Baptistão 41'; Iglesias 74'	Stadium: Nou Estadi; Attendance: 5,000; Referee: Rubén Ávalos Barrera

11 August 2018 Friendly	Borussia Mönchengladbach	1–3	Espanyol	Wegberg
15:30 CEST	Drmić 74'	Report	Piatti 45'; Iglesias 63'; Roca 81'	Stadium: Waldstadion; Attendance: 2,315; Referee: Sascha Stegemann

== Competitions ==
=== La Liga ===
Pos	Team	Pld	W	D	L	GF	GA	GD	Pts	Qualification or relegation
5	Getafe	38	15	14	9	48	35	+13	59 (Note: Getafe finished ahead of Sevilla on head-to-head points: Sevilla 0–2 Getafe, Getafe 3–0 Sevilla.)	Qualification for the Europa League group stage (Note: Since the winners of the 2018–19 Copa del Rey, Valencia, qualified for European competition based on league position, the spot awarded to the cup winners (Europa League group stage) was passed to the sixth-placed team and the spot awarded to the sixth-placed team (Europa League second qualifying round) was passed to the seventh-placed team.)
6	Sevilla	38	17	8	13	62	47	+15	59	Qualification for the Europa League group stage
7	Espanyol	38	14	11	13	48	50	−2	53 (Note: Espanyol finished ahead of Athletic Bilbao on head-to-head points: Espanyol 1–0 Athletic Bilbao, Athletic Bilbao 1–1 Espanyol.)	Qualification for the Europa League second qualifying round
8	Athletic Bilbao	38	13	14	11	41	45	−4	53	
9	Real Sociedad	38	13	11	14	45	46	−1	50 (Note: Real Sociedad finished ahead of Real Betis and Alavés on head-to-head points: Real Sociedad 6, Real Betis 5, Alavés 5. Real Betis finished ahead of Alavés on goal difference: Real Betis –8, Alavés –11.)	

Source: La Liga, Soccerway
Rules for classification: 1) Points; 2) Head-to-head points; 3) Head-to-head goal difference; 4) Goal difference; 5) Goals scored; 6) Fair-play points (Note: Head-to-head record is used only after all the matches between the teams in question have been played)

==== Results summary ====
Overall								Home						Away					
Pld	W	D	L	GF	GA	GD	Pts	W	D	L	GF	GA	GD	W	D	L	GF	GA	GD
38	14	11	13	48	50	−2	53	11	3	5	28	22	+6	3	8	8	20	28	−8

Last updated: 18 May 2019.
Source: LaLiga.es

==== Result round by round ====
Round	1	2	3	4	5	6	7	8	9	10	11	12	13	14	15	16	17	18	19	20	21	22	23	24	25	26	27	28	29	30	31	32	33	34	35	36	37	38
Ground	A	H	A	H	A	H	A	H	A	A	H	A	H	A	H	H	A	H	A	A	H	A	H	A	H	H	A	H	A	H	A	H	A	H	A	H	A	H
Result	D	W	L	W	L	W	D	W	W	D	W	L	L	L	L	L	L	W	L	L	L	D	W	D	D	W	D	L	L	D	W	W	D	D	D	W	W	W
Position	10	4	7	4	8	6	7	5	2	5	2	5	5	7	10	11	14	9	10	13	15	15	12	14	14	13	11	13	14	13	13	12	10	10	10	9	9	7

Updated to match(es) played on 18 May 2019. Source: LaLiga.es
A = Away; H = Home; W = Win; D = Draw; L = Loss

==== Matches ====
Win Draw Loss Fixtures

18 August 2018 1	Celta Vigo	1–1	Espanyol	Vigo
18:15 CEST (UTC+02:00)	Méndez (yellow card) 43'; Da. López 52' (o.g.); Aspas (yellow card) 70'; Alonso (yellow card) 90+1'	Report	Hermoso 45'; Roca (yellow card) 73'; Vilà (yellow card) 90+5'	Stadium: Abanca-Balaídos; Attendance: 16,362; Referee: Santiago Jaime Latre

26 August 2018 2	Espanyol	2–0	Valencia	Cornellà de Llobregat
18:15 CEST (UTC+02:00)	Hermoso (yellow card) 48'; Granero 62'; Iglesias 68'	Report	Diakhaby (yellow card) 30'	Stadium: RCDE Stadium; Attendance: 18,391; Referee: Carlos del Cerro Grande

2 September 2018 3	Alavés	2–1	Espanyol	Vitoria-Gasteiz
16:15 CEST (UTC+02:00)	Wakaso (yellow card) 17'; García (yellow card) 19'; Laguardia (yellow card) 39'; Pacheco (yellow card) 40'; Borja Bastón 57'; Sobrino 59'	Report	Baptistão 42' (pen.), (yellow card) 90+3'; Darder (yellow card) 44'; Iglesias (yellow card) 45'	Stadium: Mendizorrotza; Attendance: 13,102; Referee: Ignacio Iglesias Villanueva

16 September 2018 4	Espanyol	1–0	Levante	Cornellà de Llobregat
16:15 CEST (UTC+02:00)	García 52'; Vilà (yellow card) 90+4'	Report	Chema (yellow card) 61'; Luna (yellow card) 90+4'	Stadium: RCDE Stadium; Attendance: 18,172; Referee: Alberto Undiano Mallenco

22 September 2018 5	Real Madrid	1–0	Espanyol	Madrid
20:45 CEST (UTC+02:00)	Nacho (yellow card) 6'; Asensio 41'; Casemiro (yellow card) 77'	Report	Roca (yellow card) 26'; J. López (yellow card) 45'	Stadium: Santiago Bernabéu; Attendance: 68,034; Referee: Antonio Mateu Lahoz

25 September 2018 6	Espanyol	1–0	Eibar	Cornellà de Llobregat
20:00 CEST (UTC+02:00)	García (yellow card) 25'; Baptistão (yellow card) 60'; Hermoso 68'	Report	Jordán (yellow card) 66'; Bigas (yellow card) 74'	Stadium: RCDE Stadium; Attendance: 13,547; Referee: José Luis Munuera Montero

28 September 2018 7	Rayo Vallecano	2–2	Espanyol	Madrid
21:00 CEST (UTC+02:00)	De Tomás 6'; Kakuta 47' (pen.); Bebé (yellow card) 58'; Comesaña (yellow card) 64'	Report	Iglesias 19'; Granero 45'	Stadium: Vallecas; Attendance: 12,102; Referee: Javier Alberola Rojas

7 October 2018 8	Espanyol	3–1	Villarreal	Cornellà de Llobregat
18:30 CEST (UTC+02:00)	Da. López (yellow card) 5'; Pérez 7'; Hermoso (yellow card) 45'; Darder 79', (yellow card) 90'; Piatti 90+2'	Report	Miguelón (yellow card) 33'; Toko Ekambi 45'; Funes Mori (yellow card) 47'	Stadium: RCDE Stadium; Attendance: 20,032; Referee: Ricardo de Burgos Bengoetxea

21 October 2018 9	Huesca	0–2	Espanyol	Huesca
18:30 CET (UTC+01:00)	Musto (yellow card) 58'; Ávila (yellow card) 67'; Miramón (yellow card) 90+9'	Report	Granero (yellow card) 39'; Iglesias 41', 64'; Hermoso (yellow card) 68'; Vilà (yellow card) 73'	Stadium: El Alcoraz; Attendance: 6,964; Referee: Eduardo Prieto Iglesias

28 October 2018 10	Valladolid	1–1	Espanyol	Valladolid
21:00 CET (UTC+01:00)	Kiko (yellow card) 45'; Alcaraz (yellow card) 61'; Míchel (yellow card) 63'; Verde 90+1'; Plano (yellow card) 90+3'	Report	Iglesias 20'; J. López (yellow card) 73'; Vilà (yellow card) 75'	Stadium: José Zorrilla; Attendance: 18,262; Referee: Adrián Cordero Vega

5 November 2018 11	Espanyol	1–0	Athletic Bilbao	Cornellà
21:00 CET (UTC+01:00)	Iglesias 41'; Granero (yellow card) 66'	Report	San José (yellow card) 20'; D. García (yellow card) 48'; Núñez (yellow card) 76'	Stadium: RCDE Stadium; Attendance: 14,328; Referee: Pablo González Fuertes

11 November 2018 12	Sevilla	2–1	Espanyol	Seville
18:30 CET (UTC+01:00)	Vázquez (yellow card) 8'; Carriço (yellow card) 18'; Mercado (yellow card) 61', (goal) 70'; Escudero (yellow card) 88'; Ben Yedder 89'	Report	Iglesias 38'; Granero (yellow card) 54'; Di. López (yellow card) 83'	Stadium: Ramón Sánchez Pizjuán; Attendance: 38,809; Referee: Santiago Jaime Latre

25 November 2018 13	Espanyol	1–3	Girona	Cornellà de Llobregat
18:30 CET (UTC+01:00)	Di. López (yellow card) 41'; Iglesias 74', (yellow card) 75'; Hermoso (yellow card) 89'	Report	Stuani 4', 6', (yellow card) 41'; Ramalho (yellow card) 26'; Planas (yellow card) 28'; Pons (yellow card) 89'; Doumbia 90'	Stadium: RCDE Stadium; Attendance: 22,816; Referee: Alejandro Hernández Hernández

2 December 2018 14	Getafe	3–0	Espanyol	Getafe
18:30 CET (UTC+01:00)	Amath (yellow card) 18'; Maksimović (yellow card) 21'; Molina 55'; Mata (yellow card) 58', (goal) 65'; Antunes 80'	Report	Pérez (yellow card) 14'; Da. López (yellow card) 77'	Stadium: Coliseum Alfonso Pérez; Attendance: 9,287; Referee: Antonio Mateu Lahoz

8 December 2018 15	Espanyol	0–4	Barcelona	Cornellà de Llobregat
20:45 CET (UTC+01:00)	Vila (yellow card) 79'	Report	Messi 17', 65'; Dembélé 26'; Suárez 45'	Stadium: RCDE Stadium; Attendance: 24,037; Referee: Carlos del Cerro Grande

16 December 2018 16	Espanyol	1–3	Betis	Cornellà de Llobregat
16:15 CET (UTC+01:00)	García 24'; Iglesias (yellow card) 45'; Da. López (yellow card) 56'; Sánchez (yellow card) 84'	Report	Joaquín (yellow card) 18'; Carvalho (yellow card) 23'; Lo Celso 43'; Mandi (yellow card) 53'; Sidnei (yellow card) 65'; Tello 85'; Duarte 90+1' (o.g.)	Stadium: RCDE Stadium; Attendance: 20,275; Referee: José María Sánchez Martínez

22 December 2018 17	Atlético Madrid	1–0	Espanyol	Madrid
16:15 CET (UTC+01:00)	Griezmann 56' (pen.); Oblak (yellow card) 85'	Report	Granero (yellow card) 88'	Stadium: Wanda Metropolitano; Attendance: 58,069; Referee: Mario Melero López

4 January 2019 18	Espanyol	1–0	Leganés	Cornellà de Llobregat
21:00 CET (UTC+01:00)	Iglesias 9'; Vilà (yellow card) 35'; Roca (yellow card) 68'	Report	Bustinza (yellow card) 20'; Recio (yellow card) 67'; Gumbau (yellow card) 70' (yellow-red card) 90+1'; Omeruo (yellow card) 72'	Stadium: RCDE Stadium; Attendance: 15,085; Referee: José Luis González González

14 January 2019 19	Real Sociedad	3–2	Espanyol	San Sebastián
21:00 CET (UTC+01:00)	Merino 3', (yellow card) 43' (yellow-red card) 75'; Willian José 8' (pen.), 63', (yellow card) 64'; Elustondo (yellow card) 33'; Moreno (yellow card) 58'; Illarramendi (yellow card) 61'; Rulli (yellow card) 90+4'	Report	Da. López (yellow card) 7'; Darder (yellow card) 22'; Naldo 32', (yellow card) 69'; Llorente 45' (o.g.); Vilà (yellow card) 65'	Stadium: Anoeta; Attendance: 17,301; Referee: Carlos del Cerro Grande

21 January 2019 20	Eibar	3–0	Espanyol	Eibar
21:00 CET (UTC+01:00)	Enrich 24', (yellow card) 86'; Jordán (yellow card) 28'; De Blasis 52'; Charles 84'	Report	Sánchez (yellow card) 18'; Vilà (yellow card) 40'; Baptistão (yellow card) 69'; Iglesias (yellow card) 85'; Granero (yellow card) 90+1'	Stadium: Ipurua; Attendance: 3,592; Referee: Juan Martínez Munuera

27 January 2019 21	Espanyol	2–4	Real Madrid	Cornellà de Llobregat
20:45 CET (UTC+01:00)	Roca (yellow card) 7'; Baptistão 25'; García (yellow card) 34'; Rosales 81'; Á. López (yellow card) 85'	Report	Benzema 4', 45'; Ramos 15', (yellow card) 27'; Bale 67'; Varane (red card) 72'; Carvajal (yellow card) 81'; Nacho (yellow card) 88'; Courtois (yellow card) 90+1'	Stadium: RCDE Stadium; Attendance: 21,215; Referee: Jesús Gil Manzano

3 February 2019 22	Villarreal	2–2	Espanyol	Villarreal
12:00 CET (UTC+01:00)	Bonera (yellow card) 4'; Iborra 37', (yellow card) 86'; Fornals (yellow card) 40'; Funes Mori (yellow card) 53'; Cazorla 65' (pen.)	Report	Sánchez (yellow card) 39'; Vilà (yellow card) 60'; Hermoso (yellow card) 64'; Bonera 75' (o.g.); Rosales 81', (yellow card) 82'; Darder (yellow card) 90+1'	Stadium: Estadio de la Cerámica; Attendance: 15,476; Referee: Guillermo Cuadra Fernández

9 February 2019 23	Espanyol	2–1	Rayo Vallecano	Cornellà de Llobregat
18:30 CET (UTC+01:00)	Iglesias 72' (pen.); Darder 90+5'	Report	Ba 33'; Velázquez (yellow card) 71'; Amat (yellow card) 77'	Stadium: RCDE Stadium; Attendance: 22,104; Referee: Eduardo Prieto Iglesias

17 February 2019 24	Valencia	0–0	Espanyol	Valencia
16:15 CET (UTC+01:00)	Coquelin (yellow card) 66'; Roncaglia (yellow card) 84'	Report	J. López (yellow card) 28' (yellow-red card) 90+5'; Granero (yellow card) 75'; Roca (yellow card) 87'	Stadium: Mestalla; Attendance: 39,564; Referee: Ricardo de Burgos Bengoetxea

22 February 2019 25	Espanyol	1–1	Huesca	Cornellà de Llobregat
21:00 CET (UTC+01:00)	Granero 20', (yellow card) 31'; Semedo (yellow card) 80'	Report	Etxeita (yellow card) 25', (goal) 47'; Ávila (yellow card) 28'; Juanpi (yellow card) 69'; Galán (yellow card) 76'	Stadium: RCDE Stadium; Attendance: 20,078; Referee: Alejandro Hernández Hernández

2 March 2019 26	Espanyol	3–1	Valladolid	Cornellà de Llobregat
13:00 CET (UTC+01:00)	Iglesias 1', (yellow card) 90+1'; Darder (yellow card) 52'; Hermoso 55'; Wu 65'	Report	Alcaraz 17', (yellow card) 90+1'; Nacho (yellow card) 68'	Stadium: RCDE Stadium; Attendance: 20,467; Referee: Adrián Cordero Vega

8 March 2019 27	Athletic Bilbao	1–1	Espanyol	Bilbao
21:00 CET (UTC+01:00)	D. García (yellow card) 36'; Berchiche (yellow card) 45+1'; Martínez (yellow card) 78'; R. García 80'	Report	Ferreyra 9', (yellow card) 21'; Hermoso (yellow card) 24'; Melendo (yellow card) 45'; Granero (yellow card) 73'; Sánchez (yellow card) 87'	Stadium: San Mamés; Attendance: 38,453; Referee: Pablo González Fuertes

17 March 2019 28	Espanyol	0–1	Sevilla	Cornellà de Llobregat
16:15 CET (UTC+01:00)	Darder (yellow card) 65' (yellow-red card) 90+4'; Vilà (yellow card) 90+4'	Report	Ben Yedder 53' (pen.); Wöber (yellow card) 63'; Carriço (yellow card) 75'; Soriano (yellow card) 90' (yellow-red card) 90+4'	Stadium: RCDE Stadium; Attendance: 20,219; Referee: Guillermo Cuadra Fernández

30 March 2019 29	Barcelona	2–0	Espanyol	Barcelona
16:15 CET (UTC+01:00)	Messi 71', 89'	Report	Sánchez (yellow card) 69'; Granero (yellow card) 73'; Pedrosa (yellow card) 87'; Rosales (yellow card) 90+3'	Stadium: Camp Nou; Attendance: 92,795; Referee: Carlos del Cerro Grande

2 April 2019 30	Espanyol	1–1	Getafe	Cornellà de Llobregat
20:30 CEST (UTC+02:00)	Vilà (yellow card) 33'; Melendo (yellow card) 54'; Iglesias 56'; Naldo (yellow card) 81'; Hermoso (yellow card) 85'	Report	Suárez (yellow card) 23'; Ángel 72'; Cristóforo (yellow card) 78'; Djené (yellow card) 83'	Stadium: RCDE Stadium; Attendance: 16,322; Referee: Ricardo de Burgos Bengoetxea

6 April 2019 31	Girona	1–2	Espanyol	Girona
13:00 CEST (UTC+02:00)	Stuani (yellow card) 35', (goal) 80' (pen.); Granell (yellow card) 43'; Pons (yellow card) 58'; Douglas Luiz (yellow card) 73'; Ramalho (yellow card) 90+1'	Report	López (yellow card) 24'; Darder 59'; Sánchez (yellow card) 62'; Bono 89' (o.g.)	Stadium: Montilivi; Attendance: 11,393; Referee: Eduardo Prieto Iglesias

13 April 2019 32	Espanyol	2–1	Alavés	Cornellà de Llobregat
13:00 CEST (UTC+02:00)	Pedrosa 19'; Naldo (yellow card) 21'; Laguardia 47' (o.g.); Darder (yellow card) 53'; Roca (yellow card) 84'	Report	Duarte (yellow card) 39'; Calleri 56'; Laguardia (yellow card) 79'	Stadium: RCDE Stadium; Attendance: 17,522; Referee: Ignacio Iglesias Villanueva

21 April 2019 33	Levante	2–2	Espanyol	Valencia
12:00 CEST (UTC+02:00)	Rochina (yellow card) 30' (yellow-red card) 74', (goal) 72'; Chema (yellow card) 43'; Vezo 62'; Morales (yellow card) 82'	Report	Iglesias 16'; Roca 65'; Sánchez (yellow card) 70'	Stadium: Ciutat de València; Attendance: 16,876; Referee: Jesús Gil Manzano

24 April 2019 34	Espanyol	1–1	Celta Vigo	Cornellà de Llobregat
20:30 CEST (UTC+02:00)	Wu 33'; Granero (yellow card) 39'; Roca (yellow card) 81'	Report	Yokuşlu (yellow card) 41'; Gómez 72'	Stadium: RCDE Stadium; Attendance: 15,680; Referee: Alberto Undiano Mallenco

29 April 2019 35	Betis	1–1	Espanyol	Seville
21:00 CEST (UTC+02:00)	Mandi (yellow card) 58'; Feddal (yellow card) 66', (goal) 90+4'; Junior (yellow card) 78'; Bartra (yellow card) 90+6'	Report	Darder 37'; Melendo (yellow card) 68'	Stadium: Benito Villamarín; Attendance: 30,561; Referee: Carlos del Cerro Grande

4 May 2019 36	Espanyol	3–0	Atlético Madrid	Cornellà de Llobregat
16:15 CEST (UTC+02:00)	Roca (yellow card) 38'; Godín 45' (o.g.); Iglesias 52', 89' (pen.)	Report	Saúl (yellow card) 18'; Morata (yellow card) 59'	Stadium: RCDE Stadium; Attendance: 20,207; Referee: José Luis Munuera Montero

12 May 2019 37	Leganés	0–2	Espanyol	Leganés
18:30 CEST (UTC+02:00)	Bustinza (yellow card) 29' (yellow-red card) 45'; Recio (yellow card) 38'; En-Nesyri (yellow card) 90+3'	Report	Iglesias 35', 71' (pen.); Ferreyra (yellow card) 90+4'	Stadium: Butarque; Attendance: 10,597; Referee: Mario Melero López

18 May 2019 38	Espanyol	2–0	Real Sociedad	Cornellà de Llobregat
16:15 CEST (UTC+02:00)	Rosales 58'; Sánchez (yellow card) 62'; Wu 65', (yellow card) 66'	Report	Llorente (yellow card) 37'; Elustondo (yellow card) 82'	Stadium: RCDE Stadium; Attendance: 26,586; Referee: Santiago Jaime Latre

=== Copa del Rey ===
==== Round of 32 ====
1 November 2018 First leg	Cádiz	2–1	Espanyol	Cádiz
18:30 CET (UTC+01:00)	Lekić 1'; Azamoum (yellow card) 22', (goal) 41'; José Mari (yellow card) 51'	Report	Puado 36'; Rosales (yellow card) 65'; Melendo (yellow card) 84'	Stadium: Ramón de Carranza; Attendance: 11,830; Referee: Juan Martínez Munuera

4 December 2018 Second leg	Espanyol	1–0 (2–2 (a) agg.)	Cádiz	Cornellà de Llobregat
21:30 CET (UTC+01:00)	Pérez 76'; Sánchez (yellow card) 85'	Report	Matos (yellow card) 19'; Kecojević (yellow card) 88'	Stadium: RCDE Stadium; Attendance: 12,560; Referee: Ricardo de Burgos Bengoetxea

==== Round of 16 ====
9 January 2019 First leg	Villarreal	2–2	Espanyol	Villarreal
20:30 CET (UTC+01:00)	Costa (yellow card) 9'; Cáseres (yellow card) 41'; Raba (yellow card) 64'; Toko Ekambi 85'; Bacca 89'	Report	Darder 15'; A. López 71'; Roca (yellow card) 90+4'	Stadium: Estadio de la Cerámica; Attendance: 12,207; Referee: José Luis Munuera Montero

17 January 2019 Second leg	Espanyol	3–1 (5–3 agg.)	Villarreal	Barcelona
20:30 CET (UTC+01:00)	Da. López (yellow card) 34'; Piatti 34' (pen.); Iglesias 37' (pen.), 74'; Vilà (yellow card) 58'	Report	Cáseres (yellow card) 29'; Bacca (yellow card) 34'; Layún (yellow card) 40'; Chukwueze 42'; Fuego (yellow card) 90+2'	Stadium: RCDE Stadium; Attendance: 11,171; Referee: Pablo González Fuertes

==== Quarter-finals ====
24 January 2019 First leg	Espanyol	1–1	Real Betis	Barcelona
19:30 CET (UTC+01:00)	Hermoso (yellow card) 6'; Iglesias 27'	Report	Feddal (yellow card) 8'; Sanabria 81'	Stadium: RCDE Stadium; Attendance: 13,381; Referee: Antonio Mateu Lahoz

30 January 2019 Second leg	Real Betis	3–1 (a.e.t.) (4–2 agg.)	Espanyol	Seville
19:30 CET (UTC+01:00)	Lainez (yellow card) 35'; Lo Celso (yellow card) 51', (goal) 76'; Mandi (yellow card) 72', (goal) 99'; Canales (yellow card) 90+1'; León (yellow card) 90+2', (goal) 95'; Francis (yellow card) 115'	Report	Hermoso (yellow card) 13'; Baptistão 33', (yellow card) 90'; Roca (yellow card) 58' (yellow-red card) 90+4'; Rosales (yellow card) 85'; Granero (yellow card) 87'; García (yellow card) 92'	Stadium: Benito Villamarín; Attendance: 40,028; Referee: Ricardo de Burgos Bengoetxea

== Statistics ==
=== Appearances and goals ===
Last updated on 18 May 2019.

No.	Pos	Nat	Player	Total		La Liga		Copa del Rey	
No.	Pos	Nat	Player	Apps	Goals	Apps	Goals	Apps	Goals
Goalkeepers
1	GK	(Spain) ESP	Roberto	6	0	0	0	6	0
13	GK	(Spain) ESP	Diego López	38	0	38	0	0	0
Defenders
5	DF	(Brazil) BRA	Naldo	18	1	16	1	2	0
6	DF	(Costa Rica) CRC	Óscar Duarte	13	1	7+4	1	2	0
8	DF	(Venezuela) VEN	Roberto Rosales	26	3	20+1	3	5	0
12	DF	(Spain) ESP	Dídac Vilà	29	0	27	0	1+1	0
16	DF	(Spain) ESP	Javi López	25	0	21+2	0	2	0
22	DF	(Spain) ESP	Mario Hermoso	35	3	31+1	3	3	0
27	DF	(Spain) ESP	Lluís López	10	0	5+1	0	2+2	0
28	DF	(Spain) ESP	Adrià Pedrosa	16	1	8+4	1	4	0
Midfielders
2	MF	(Guinea-Bissau) GBS	Alfa Semedo	3	0	0+3	0	0	0
4	MF	(Spain) ESP	Víctor Sánchez	28	0	13+11	0	2+2	0
10	MF	(Spain) ESP	Sergi Darder	40	5	32+2	4	4+2	1
14	MF	(Spain) ESP	Óscar Melendo	37	0	22+10	0	4+1	0
15	MF	(Spain) ESP	David López	24	0	21	0	3	0
18	MF	(Spain) ESP	Álex Lopez	8	1	1+3	0	3+1	1
21	MF	(Spain) ESP	Marc Roca	40	1	35	1	4+1	0
23	MF	(Spain) ESP	Esteban Granero	21	3	9+10	3	1+1	0
Forwards
7	FW	(Spain) ESP	Borja Iglesias	43	20	35+2	17	4+2	3
9	FW	(Spain) ESP	Sergio García	31	2	17+12	2	0+2	0
11	FW	(Argentina) ARG	Facundo Ferreyra	9	1	1+8	1	0	0
17	FW	(Paraguay) PAR	Hernán Pérez	21	2	10+9	1	1+1	1
19	FW	(Argentina) ARG	Pablo Piatti	26	2	6+14	1	6	1
20	FW	(Spain) ESP	Javi Puado	20	1	2+13	0	3+2	1
24	FW	(China) CHN	Wu Lei	16	3	12+4	3	0	0
Players who have made an appearance or had a squad number this season but have left the club
2	DF	(Spain) ESP	Pipa	0	0	0	0	0	0
11	FW	(Brazil) BRA	Léo Baptistão	24	3	14+6	2	4	1
