= 2018–19 Villarreal CF season =

Villarreal
2018–19 season
- President: Fernando Roig
- Head coach: Javier Calleja (until 10 December); Luis García (from 10 December to 29 January); Javier Calleja (from 30 January)
- Stadium: Estadio de la Cerámica
- La Liga: 14th
- Copa del Rey: Round of 16
- UEFA Europa League: Quarter-finals
- Top goalscorer: League: Karl Toko Ekambi (10); All: Karl Toko Ekambi (18)
Home colours	Away colours	Third colours

The 2018–19 season was Villarreal Club de Fútbol's 96th season in existence and the club's 6th consecutive season in the top flight of Spanish football. In addition to the domestic league, Villarreal participated in this season's editions of the Copa del Rey and the UEFA Europa League. The season covered the period from 1 July 2018 to 30 June 2019.

== Players ==
=== First-team squad ===
As of 4 September 2018

Note: Flags indicate national team as defined under FIFA eligibility rules; some limited exceptions apply. Players may hold more than one non-FIFA nationality.

No.	Pos.	Nation	Player
1	GK	ESP	Sergio Asenjo
2	DF	ESP	Mario Gaspar (vice-captain)
3	DF	ESP	Álvaro
4	DF	ARG	Ramiro Funes Mori
5	MF	ARG	Santiago Cáseres
6	DF	ESP	Víctor Ruiz
7	FW	ESP	Gerard
8	MF	ESP	Pablo Fornals
9	FW	COL	Carlos Bacca
10	FW	ITA	Nicola Sansone
11	DF	ESP	Jaume Costa
13	GK	ESP	Andrés Fernández
14	MF	ESP	Manu Trigueros

No.	Pos.	Nation	Player
15	DF	ESP	Miguelón
16	MF	ESP	Alfonso Pedraza
17	FW	CMR	Karl Toko Ekambi
18	MF	ESP	Javi Fuego
19	MF	ESP	Santi Cazorla
20	MF	CHI	Manuel Iturra
21	MF	ESP	Bruno (captain)
22	MF	ESP	Dani Raba
23	DF	ITA	Daniele Bonera
24	DF	MEX	Miguel Layún
25	GK	ARG	Mariano Barbosa
28	MF	ESP	Manu Morlanes

=== Reserve team ===
Note: Flags indicate national team as defined under FIFA eligibility rules; some limited exceptions apply. Players may hold more than one non-FIFA nationality.

No.	Pos.	Nation	Player
30	MF	NGR	Samuel Chukwueze
40	MF	GHA	Emmanuel Lomotey (on loan from Extremadura)

=== Out on loan ===
Note: Flags indicate national team as defined under FIFA eligibility rules; some limited exceptions apply. Players may hold more than one non-FIFA nationality.

No.	Pos.	Nation	Player
—	GK	ESP	Ander Cantero (at Rayo Majadahonda until 30 June 2019)
—	DF	ESP	Juan Ibiza (at Almería until 30 June 2019)
—	DF	ESP	Pau Torres (at Málaga until 30 June 2019)
—	DF	POR	Ivan Abramovic (at Huesca until 30 June 2019)
—	MF	SEN	Alfred N'Diaye (at Málaga until 30 June 2019)
—	MF	ESP	Chuca (at Elche until 30 June 2019)
—	MF	URU	Ramiro Guerra (at Gimnàstic until 30 June 2019)

No.	Pos.	Nation	Player
—	MF	RUS	Denis Cheryshev (at Valencia until 30 June 2019)
—	MF	ARG	Leo Suárez (at Valladolid until 30 June 2019)
—	MF	ITA	Roberto Soriano (at Torino until 30 June 2019)
—	FW	QAT	Akram Afif (at Al Sadd until 30 June 2019)
—	FW	ARG	Cristian Espinoza (at Boca Juniors until 31 December 2018)
—	FW	TUR	Enes Ünal (at Valladolid until 30 June 2019)

== Transfers ==
=== In ===
Date	Player	From	Type	Fee	Ref
6 June 2018	(Cameroon) Karl Toko Ekambi	(France) Angers	Transfer	€18,000,000	
12 June 2018	(Spain) Gerard	(Spain) Espanyol	Transfer	€20,000,000	
21 June 2018	(Argentina) Ramiro Funes Mori	(England) Everton	Transfer	€20,000,000	
30 June 2018	(Qatar) Akram Afif	(Qatar) Al Sadd	Loan return		
30 June 2018	(Argentina) Cristian Espinoza	(Argentina) Boca Juniors	Loan return		
30 June 2018	(Senegal) Alfred N'Diaye	(England) Wolverhampton Wanderers	Loan return		
30 June 2018	(Spain) Matías Nahuel	(Spain) Barcelona B	Loan return		
30 June 2018	(Spain) Alfonso Pedraza	(Spain) Alavés	Loan return		
11 July 2018	(Mexico) Miguel Layún	(Portugal) Porto	Transfer	€4,000,000	
16 July 2018	(Argentina) Santiago Cáseres	(Argentina) Vélez Sarsfield	Transfer	€10,000,000	
9 August 2018	(Spain) Santi Cazorla	Unattached	Transfer	Free	
17 August 2018	(Colombia) Carlos Bacca	(Italy) Milan	Transfer	€7,000,000	

=== Out ===
Date	Player	To	Type	Fee	Ref
24 May 2018	(Spain) Rodri	(Spain) Atlético Madrid	Transfer	€20,000,000	
13 June 2018	(Colombia) Roger Martínez	(China) Jiangsu Suning	Loan return		
30 June 2018	(Saudi Arabia) Salem Al-Dawsari	(Saudi Arabia) Al-Hilal	Loan return		
30 June 2018	(Colombia) Carlos Bacca	(Italy) Milan	Loan return		
4 July 2018	(Serbia) Antonio Rukavina	(Kazakhstan) Astana	Transfer	Free	
19 July 2018	(Portugal) Rúben Semedo	(Spain) Huesca	Loan		
6 August 2018	(Spain) Pau Torres	(Spain) Málaga	Loan		
9 August 2018	(Spain) Adrián Marín	(Spain) Alavés	Transfer	Undisclosed	
10 August 2018	(Senegal) Alfred N'Diaye	(Spain) Málaga	Loan		
14 August 2018	(Russia) Denis Cheryshev	(Spain) Valencia	Loan		
17 August 2018	(Spain) Samu Castillejo	(Italy) Milan	Transfer	€25,000,000	
17 August 2018	(Italy) Roberto Soriano	(Italy) Torino	Loan	€1,000,000	
19 August 2018	(Argentina) Leo Suárez	(Spain) Valladolid	Loan		
19 August 2018	(Turkey) Enes Ünal	(Spain) Valladolid	Loan		
21 August 2018	(Uruguay) Ramiro Guerra	(Spain) Gimnàstic	Loan		
31 August 2018	(Spain) Matías Nahuel	(Greece) Olympiacos	Transfer	Undisclosed	

== Competitions ==
=== Overall record ===
Competition	First match	Last match	Starting round	Final position	Record							
Competition	First match	Last match	Starting round	Final position	Pld	W	D	L	GF	GA	GD	Win %
La Liga	18 August 2018	19 May 2019	Matchday 1	14th	38	10	14	14	49	52	−3	26.32
Copa del Rey	1 November 2018	17 January 2019	Round of 32	Round of 16	4	1	2	1	14	8	+6	25.00
UEFA Europa League	20 September 2018	18 April 2019	Group stage	Quarter-finals	12	5	5	2	20	13	+7	41.67
Total					54	16	21	17	83	73	+10	29.63

Source: Competitions

=== La Liga ===
==== League table ====
Pos	Team	Pld	W	D	L	GF	GA	GD	Pts
12	Eibar	38	11	14	13	46	50	−4	47
13	Leganés	38	11	12	15	37	43	−6	45
14	Villarreal	38	10	14	14	49	52	−3	44 (Note: Villarreal finished ahead of Levante on head-to-head points: Villarreal 1–1 Levante, Levante 0–2 Villarreal.)
15	Levante	38	11	11	16	59	66	−7	44
16	Valladolid	38	10	11	17	32	51	−19	41 (Note: Valladolid finished ahead of Celta Vigo on head-to-head points: Celta Vigo 3–3 Valladolid, Valladolid 2–1 Celta Vigo.)

Source: La Liga, Soccerway
Rules for classification: 1) Points; 2) Head-to-head points; 3) Head-to-head goal difference; 4) Goal difference; 5) Goals scored; 6) Fair-play points (Note: Head-to-head record is used only after all the matches between the teams in question have been played)

==== Results summary ====
Overall								Home						Away					
Pld	W	D	L	GF	GA	GD	Pts	W	D	L	GF	GA	GD	W	D	L	GF	GA	GD
38	10	14	14	49	52	−3	44	5	8	6	28	26	+2	5	6	8	21	26	−5

Source: Competitive matches

==== Results by round ====
Round	1	2	3	4	5	6	7	8	9	10	11	12	13	14	15	16	17	18	19	20	21	22	23	24	25	26	27	28	29	30	31	32	33	34	35	36	37	38
Ground	H	A	H	A	H	A	H	A	H	A	H	A	H	A	H	A	H	A	H	H	A	H	A	H	A	H	A	H	A	H	A	A	H	A	H	A	H	A
Result	L	D	L	W	D	W	L	L	D	L	D	D	W	L	L	D	D	D	L	D	L	D	D	W	L	L	W	W	L	D	L	W	W	W	D	L	W	D
Position	16	13	18	14	14	9	12	16	16	17	16	16	16	17	17	17	17	18	19	19	19	19	19	18	18	18	17	17	17	17	18	15	14	14	14	15	14	14

Source: Competitive matches
A = Away; H = Home; W = Win; D = Draw; L = Loss

==== Matches ====
Win Draw Loss Fixtures

18 August 2018 1	Villarreal	1–2	Real Sociedad	Villarreal
20:15 CEST (UTC+2)	Gerard 16'; Morlanes (yellow card) 36'; Cáseres (yellow card) 67'	Report	Willian José 40'; Hernandez (yellow card) 51'; Juanmi 71', (yellow card) 75'; Zaldúa (yellow card) 77'	Stadium: Estadio de la Cerámica; Attendance: 15,900; Referee: Mario Melero López

26 August 2018 2	Sevilla	0–0	Villarreal	Seville
22:15 CEST (UTC+2)	Mercado (yellow card) 44'; Sarabia (yellow card) 81'; Kjær (yellow card) 90+2'	Report	Mario Gaspar (yellow card) 5'; Costa (yellow card) 88'	Stadium: Ramón Sánchez Pizjuán; Attendance: 35,831; Referee: Alberto Undiano Mallenco

31 August 2018 3	Villarreal	0–1	Girona	Villarreal
22:00 CEST (UTC+2)	Trigueros (yellow card) 75'; Mario Gaspar (yellow card) 85'; Sansone (yellow card) 89'	Report	Alcalá (yellow card) 23'; Stuani 54'; Benítez (yellow card) 56'	Stadium: Estadio de la Cerámica; Attendance: 15,452; Referee: Eduardo Prieto Iglesias

16 September 2018 4	Leganés	0–1	Villarreal	Leganés
12:00 CEST (UTC+2)	Silva (yellow card) 27'; Nyom (yellow card) 64'; Pérez (yellow card) 82'; Bustinza (yellow card) 90+4'	Report	Costa (yellow card) 45'; Mario Gaspar (yellow card) 48'; Bacca 65'; Ruiz (yellow card) 90+4'	Stadium: Municipal de Butarque; Attendance: 9,775; Referee: Pablo González Fuertes

23 September 2018 5	Villarreal	0–0	Valencia	Villarreal
16:15 CEST (UTC+2)	Costa (yellow card) 38'; Layún (yellow card) 63'; Funes Mori (yellow card) 84'; Mario Gaspar (yellow card) 90'	Report	Diakhaby (yellow card) 22'; Parejo (red card) 58'	Stadium: Estadio de la Cerámica; Attendance: 18,373; Referee: Santiago Jaime Latre

26 September 2018 6	Athletic Bilbao	0–3	Villarreal	Bilbao
20:00 CEST (UTC+2)	De Marcos (yellow card) 73'	Report	Fornals 65'; Ruiz (yellow card) 76'; Funes Mori 80'; Toko Ekambi 89'	Stadium: San Mamés; Attendance: 39,672; Referee: Carlos del Cerro Grande

30 September 2018 7	Villarreal	0–1	Valladolid	Villarreal
16:15 CEST (UTC+2)	Mario Gaspar (yellow card) 35'; Bacca (yellow card) 45'; Cazorla (yellow card) 60'	Report	Čop (yellow card) 36'; Suárez 53'; Kiko (yellow card) 82'; Nacho (yellow card) 85'	Stadium: Estadio de la Cerámica; Attendance: 15,602; Referee: Ignacio Iglesias Villanueva

7 October 2018 8	Espanyol	3–1	Villarreal	Cornellà de Llobregat
18:30 CEST (UTC+2)	David López (yellow card) 5'; Pérez 7'; Hermoso (yellow card) 45'; Darder 79', (yellow card) 90'; Piatti 90+2'	Report	Miguelón (yellow card) 33'; Toko Ekambi 45'; Funes Mori (yellow card) 47'	Stadium: RCDE Stadium; Attendance: 20,032; Referee: Ricardo de Burgos Bengoetxea

20 October 2018 9	Villarreal	1–1	Atlético Madrid	Villarreal
18:30 CEST (UTC+2)	Iturra (yellow card) 31'; Álvaro (yellow card) 44'; Mario Gaspar 65'; Pedraza (yellow card) 68'	Report	Juanfran (yellow card) 28'; Filipe Luís 51'	Stadium: Estadio de la Cerámica; Attendance: 17,518; Referee: Xavier Estrada Fernández

28 October 2018 10	Alavés	2–1	Villarreal	Vitoria-Gasteiz
18:30 CET (UTC+1)	Calleri 51'; Duarte (yellow card) 73'; Borja 90+4'	Report	Gerard 10'; Funes Mori (yellow card) 27'	Stadium: Mendizorrotza; Attendance: 13,083; Referee: Guillermo Cuadra Fernández

4 November 2018 11	Villarreal	1–1	Levante	Villarreal
16:15 CET (UTC+1)	Costa (yellow card) 30'; Cáseras (yellow card) 39'; Pedraza 90+3'; Álvaro (yellow card) 90+4'	Report	Jason (yellow card) 31'; Rochina (yellow card) 37'; Funes Mori 77' (o.g.); Bardhi (yellow card) 78'	Stadium: Estadio de la Cerámica; Attendance: 16,855; Referee: Carlos del Cerro Grande

11 November 2018 12	Rayo Vallecano	2–2	Villarreal	Madrid
18:30 CET (UTC+1)	Amat (yellow card) 44'; De Tomás 45'; García 66'	Report	Chukwueze 33'; Álvaro (yellow card) 61' (yellow-red card) 90+2'; Sansone 80'; Trigueros (yellow card) 87'	Stadium: Vallecas; Attendance: 11,840; Referee: José Luis González González

25 November 2018 13	Villarreal	2–1	Real Betis	Villarreal
20:45 CET (UTC+1)	Gerard 52'; Chukwueze 54'; Morlanes (yellow card) 72'; Ruiz (yellow card) 89'	Report	Canales (yellow card) 89'; Lo Celso 90'	Stadium: Estadio de la Cerámica; Attendance: 16,028; Referee: Eduardo Prieto Iglesias

2 December 2018 14	Barcelona	2–0	Villarreal	Barcelona
18:30 CET (UTC+1)	Lenglet (yellow card) 18'; Piqué 36'; Alba (yellow card) 69'; Aleñá 87'	Report	Ruiz (yellow card) 11'; Álvaro (yellow card) 26'; Fornals (yellow card) 90'; Pedraza (yellow card) 90+1'	Stadium: Camp Nou; Attendance: 73,003; Referee: José Luis Munuera Montero

9 December 2018 15	Villarreal	2–3	Celta Vigo	Villarreal
18:30 CET (UTC+1)	Cáseras (yellow card) 14'; Álvaro (yellow card) 39'; Mario Gaspar (yellow card) 48'; Bacca 83', 87'	Report	Méndez 44'; Yokuşlu 49', (yellow card) 76'; Gómez 51', (yellow card) 85'; Blanco (yellow card) 90+3'	Stadium: Estadio de la Cerámica; Attendance: 15,720; Referee: Jesús Gil Manzano

16 December 2018 16	Huesca	2–2	Villarreal	Huesca
18:30 CET (UTC+1)	Ávila (yellow card) 16'; Hernández 44' (pen.); Insua (yellow card) 53'; Pulido (yellow card) 73'; Longo 90+4', (yellow card) 90+4'	Report	Trigueros (yellow card) 42'; Mario Gaspar (yellow card) 43' (yellow-red card) 65'; Bacca 63' (pen.), (yellow card) 66'; Gerard 81'; Cáseres (yellow card) 90+4'	Stadium: El Alcoraz; Attendance: 6,455; Referee: David Medié Jiménez

3 January 2019 17	Villarreal	2–2	Real Madrid	Villarreal
21:30 CET (UTC+1)	Cazorla 4', 82'; Álvaro (yellow card) 45'; Costa (yellow card) 90+1'	Report	Benzema 7'; Varane 20'; Casemiro (yellow card) 41'; Ramos (yellow card) 89'	Stadium: Estadio de la Cerámica; Attendance: 19,903; Referee: Pablo González Fuertes
Note: The match, originally scheduled for 22 December 2018, was moved because of Real Madrid's involvement in the 2018 FIFA Club World Cup.

6 January 2019 18	Eibar	0–0	Villarreal	Eibar
12:00 CET (UTC+1)		Report	Funes Mori (yellow card) 58'; Fuego (yellow card) 69'	Stadium: Ipurua; Attendance: 4,141; Referee: Santiago Jaime Latre

12 January 2019 19	Villarreal	1–2	Getafe	Villarreal
20:45 CET (UTC+1)	Álvaro (yellow card) 29'; Gerard (yellow card) 36'; Costa (yellow card) 39'; Cabrera 75' (o.g.); Toko Ekambi (yellow card) 85'; Funes Mori (yellow card) 89'	Report	Foulquier (yellow card) 13'; Arambarri (yellow card) 30'; Molina 52'; Ángel 89', (yellow card) 90+3'	Stadium: Estadio de la Cerámica; Attendance: 13,671; Referee: Xavier Estrada Fernández

20 January 2019 20	Villarreal	1–1	Athletic Bilbao	Villarreal
16:15 CET (UTC+1)	Funes Mori (yellow card) 37'; Iborra (yellow card) 54'; Mario Gaspar (yellow card) 57'; Álvaro (yellow card) 62'; Toko Ekambi 71'	Report	Costa 18' (o.g.); Beñat (yellow card) 40'	Stadium: Estadio de la Cerámica; Attendance: 17,054; Referee: Alberto Undiano Mallenco

26 January 2019 21	Valencia	3–0	Villarreal	Valencia
18:30 CET (UTC+1)	Diakhaby 4'; Cheryshev 51'; Gayà (yellow card) 72'; Rodrigo 86'	Report	Ruiz (yellow card) 15'; Iborra (yellow card) 26'; Mario Gaspar (yellow card) 76'	Stadium: Mestalla; Attendance: 37,685; Referee: Carlos del Cerro Grande

3 February 2019 22	Villarreal	2–2	Espanyol	Villarreal
12:00 CET (UTC+1)	Bonera (yellow card) 4'; Iborra 37', (yellow card) 86'; Fornals (yellow card) 40'; Funes Mori (yellow card) 53'; Cazorla 65' (pen.)	Report	Sánchez (yellow card) 39'; Vilà (yellow card) 60'; Hermoso (yellow card) 64'; Bonera 75' (o.g.); Rosales 81', (yellow card) 82'; Darder (yellow card) 90+1'	Stadium: Estadio de la Cerámica; Attendance: 15,476; Referee: Guillermo Cuadra Fernández

8 February 2019 23	Valladolid	0–0	Villarreal	Valladolid
21:00 CET (UTC+1)	Plano (yellow card) 8'; Alcaraz (yellow card) 56'; Hervías (yellow card) 65'	Report	Funes Mori (yellow card) 29'; Cazorla (yellow card) 42'	Stadium: José Zorrilla; Attendance: 16,842; Referee: Alejandro Hernández Hernández

17 February 2019 24	Villarreal	3–0	Sevilla	Villarreal
18:30 CET (UTC+1)	Toko Ekambi (yellow card) 12', (goal) 45'; Álvaro 20', (yellow card) 52'; Mario Gaspar (yellow card) 68'; Funes Mori (yellow card) 81'; Pedraza 86'	Report	Mesa (yellow card) 60'	Stadium: Estadio de la Cerámica; Attendance: 17,402; Referee: José Luis González González

24 February 2019 25	Atlético Madrid	2–0	Villarreal	Madrid
16:15 CET (UTC+1)	Morata 31'; Saúl 88'	Report	Álvaro (yellow card) 66'; Cáseres (yellow card) 70'; Ruiz (yellow card) 79'	Stadium: Wanda Metropolitano; Attendance: 59,114; Referee: Alberto Undiano Mallenco

2 March 2019 26	Villarreal	1–2	Alavés	Villarreal
16:15 CET (UTC+1)	Cazorla 61' (pen.); Álvaro (yellow card) 71'; Ruiz (yellow card) 89'	Report	Calleri (yellow card) 30'; Jony (yellow card) 40'; Maripán 54'; Laguardia (yellow card) 65'; Inui 77'	Stadium: Estadio de la Cerámica; Attendance: 15,488; Referee: José Luis Munuera Montero

10 March 2019 27	Levante	0–2	Villarreal	Valencia
18:30 CET (UTC+1)	Cabaco (yellow card) 36'; Campaña (yellow card) 76'; Rochina (yellow card) 85'	Report	Mario Gaspar (yellow card) 23'; Gerard (yellow card) 39'; Toko Ekambi (yellow card) 60'; Funes Mori (yellow card) 69'; Iborra (yellow card) 82'; Róber 90+3' (o.g.); Chukwueze 90+6'	Stadium: Ciutat de València; Attendance: 20,149; Referee: José María Sánchez Martínez

17 March 2019 28	Villarreal	3–1	Rayo Vallecano	Villarreal
18:30 CET (UTC+1)	Funes Mori (yellow card) 44'; Toko Ekambi 50', 52'; Ruiz (yellow card) 79'; Álvaro (yellow card) 82'; Gerard 88'	Report	Suárez 20'; Velázquez (yellow card) 51'; Gálvez (yellow card) 66'; Amat (yellow card) 82'	Stadium: Estadio de la Cerámica; Attendance: 17,117; Referee: José Luis González González

30 March 2019 29	Celta Vigo	3–2	Villarreal	Vigo
18:30 CET (UTC+1)	Aspas 50', 86' (pen.); Mallo (yellow card) 61'; Gómez 71'	Report	Toko Ekambi 11'; Pedraza 15', (yellow card) 44'; Mario Gaspar (yellow card) 50'; Ruiz (yellow card) 60'	Stadium: Abanca-Balaídos; Attendance: 22,315; Referee: Jesús Gil Manzano

2 April 2019 30	Villarreal	4–4	Barcelona	Villarreal
21:00 CEST (UTC+2)	Chukwueze 23'; Álvaro (yellow card) 36' (yellow-red card) 86'; Funes Mori (yellow card) 45'; Toko Ekambi 50'; Iborra 62'; Bacca 80'; Cáseres (yellow card) 90+1'	Report	Coutinho 12'; Malcom 16'; Busquets (yellow card) 39'; Lenglet (yellow card) 42'; Vidal (yellow card) 77'; Aleñá (yellow card) 83'; Messi (yellow card) 84', (goal) 90'; Roberto (yellow card) 85'; Suárez (yellow card) 90+1', (goal) 90+3'	Stadium: Estadio de la Cerámica; Attendance: 19,515; Referee: Alejandro Hernández Hernández

7 April 2019 31	Real Betis	2–1	Villarreal	Seville
20:45 CEST (UTC+2)	Lo Celso 11', 63'; Jesé (yellow card) 45'; Feddal (yellow card) 79'; Carvalho (yellow card) 90+5'; Tello (yellow card) 90+6'	Report	Funes Mori 13'; Chukwueze (yellow card) 20'; Ruiz (yellow card) 35'; Cáseres (yellow card) 52'; Mario Gaspar (yellow card) 90+3'	Stadium: Benito Villamarín; Attendance: 28,475; Referee: Xavier Estrada Fernández

14 April 2019 32	Girona	0–1	Villarreal	Girona
18:30 CEST (UTC+2)	Juanpe (yellow card) 74'; Pons (yellow card) 79'	Report	Chukwueze 7', (yellow card) 76'; Fornals (yellow card) 51'; Mario Gaspar (yellow card) 87'; Cáseres (yellow card) 90+5'; Funes Mori (yellow card) 90+6'	Stadium: Montilivi; Attendance: 11,535; Referee: Adrián Cordero Vega

21 April 2019 33	Villarreal	2–1	Leganés	Villarreal
18:30 CEST (UTC+2)	Bacca 64'; Toko Ekambi 80'; Fernández (yellow card) 90'; Cáseres (yellow card) 90+1'	Report	El Zhar 87' (pen.); Omeruo (yellow card) 90'	Stadium: Estadio de la Cerámica; Attendance: 14,661; Referee: Eduardo Prieto Iglesias

25 April 2019 34	Real Sociedad	0–1	Villarreal	San Sebastián
20:30 CEST (UTC+2)	Navas (yellow card) 24'; Oyarzabal (yellow card) 79'	Report	Funes Mori (yellow card) 42'; Toko Ekambi (yellow card) 68'; Iborra (yellow card) 78'; Gerard 85'	Stadium: Anoeta; Attendance: 20,060; Referee: José Luis Munuera Montero

28 April 2019 35	Villarreal	1–1	Huesca	Villarreal
18:30 CEST (UTC+2)	Mario Gaspar (yellow card) 7'; Fornals 30', (yellow card) 40'; Toko Ekambi (yellow card) 56'; Cáseres (yellow card) 75'; Quintillà (yellow card) 90+1'	Report	Galán (yellow card) 53'; Ávila 78'; Herrera (yellow card) 86'; Pulido (red card) 90+2'	Stadium: Estadio de la Cerámica; Attendance: 17,901; Referee: José María Sánchez Martínez

5 May 2019 36	Real Madrid	3–2	Villarreal	Madrid
16:15 CEST (UTC+2)	Mariano 2', 49'; Vallejo 40'	Report	Gerard 11'; Funes Mori (yellow card) 43'; Álvaro (yellow card) 84'; Iborra (yellow card) 89'; Costa 90+4'	Stadium: Santiago Bernabéu; Attendance: 46,294; Referee: Jesús Gil Manzano

12 May 2019 37	Villarreal	1–0	Eibar	Villarreal
18:30 CEST (UTC+2)	Toko Ekambi 59'; Mario Gaspar (yellow card) 76'; Gerard (yellow card) 90+4'; Bacca (yellow card) 90+5'	Report	Cucurella (yellow card) 64'; José Ángel (yellow card) 90+4'	Stadium: Estadio de la Cerámica; Attendance: 17,901; Referee: Pablo González Fuertes

18 May 2019 38	Getafe	2–2	Villarreal	Getafe
16:15 CEST (UTC+2)	Portillo 13'; Maksimović (yellow card) 57', (goal) 76'; Suárez (yellow card) 90+2'	Report	Álvaro (yellow card) 22'; Fernández (yellow card) 22'; Iborra 44', (yellow card) 46'; Gerard 87'	Stadium: Coliseum Alfonso Pérez; Attendance: 13,579; Referee: Xavier Estrada Fernández

=== Copa del Rey ===
==== Round of 32 ====
1 November 2018 First leg	Almería	3–3	Villarreal	Almería
18:30 CET (UTC+1)	Trujillo (yellow card) 43'; Chema 52' (pen.); Gassama 86', 90+1'; Eteki (yellow card) 90+4'	Report	Mario Gaspar (yellow card) 49'; Cazorla 67'; Callejón 78' (o.g.); Chukwueze 83'	Stadium: Juegos Mediterráneos; Attendance: 8,004; Referee: Javier Alberola Rojas

5 December 2018 Second leg	Villarreal	8–0 (11–3 agg.)	Almería	Villarreal
20:30 CET (UTC+1)	Toko Ekambi 23', 30', 36', 47'; Bacca 45', 83' (pen.); Gerard 67'; Raba 89'	Report	Adri (yellow card) 40'; Arzura (yellow card) 81'	Stadium: Estadio de la Cerámica; Attendance: 12,739; Referee: Pablo González Fuertes

==== Round of 16 ====
9 January 2019 First leg	Villarreal	2–2	Espanyol	Villarreal
20:30 CET (UTC+1)	Costa (yellow card) 9'; Cáseres (yellow card) 41'; Raba (yellow card) 64'; Toko Ekambi 85'; Bacca 89'	Report	Darder 15'; A. López 71'; Roca (yellow card) 90+4'	Stadium: Estadio de la Cerámica; Attendance: 12,207; Referee: José Luis Munuera Montero

17 January 2019 Second leg	Espanyol	3–1 (5–3 agg.)	Villarreal	Barcelona
20:30 CET (UTC+1)	Da. López (yellow card) 34'; Piatti 34' (pen.); Iglesias 37' (pen.), 74'; Vilà (yellow card) 58'	Report	Cáseres (yellow card) 29'; Bacca (yellow card) 34'; Layún (yellow card) 40'; Chukwueze 42'; Fuego (yellow card) 90+2'	Stadium: RCDE Stadium; Attendance: 11,171; Referee: Pablo González Fuertes

=== UEFA Europa League ===
==== Group stage ====
Pos	Team	Pld	W	D	L	GF	GA	GD	Pts	Qualification	VIL	RW	RAN	SPM
1	(Spain) Villarreal	6	2	4	0	12	5	+7	10 (Note: Head-to-head points: Villarreal 4, Rapid Wien 1.)	Advance to knockout phase	—	5–0	2–2	2–0
2	(Austria) Rapid Wien	6	3	1	2	6	9	−3	10	Advance to knockout phase	0–0	—	1–0	2–0
3	(Scotland) Rangers	6	1	3	2	8	8	0	6		0–0	3–1	—	0–0
4	(Russia) Spartak Moscow	6	1	2	3	8	12	−4	5		3–3	1–2	4–3	—

Source: UEFA
Rules for classification: Group stage tiebreakers
Notes:

20 September 2018 1	Villarreal (Spain)	2–2	(Scotland) Rangers	Villarreal, Spain
18:55 CEST (UTC+2)	Bacca 1'; Gerard 69'; Miguelón (yellow card) 72'	Report	Goldson (yellow card) 17'; Arfield 67'; Lafferty 76'; Dorrans (yellow card) 90+3'	Stadium: Estadio de la Cerámica; Attendance: 15,982; Referee: István Kovács (Romania)

4 October 2018 2	Spartak Moscow (Russia)	3–3	(Spain) Villarreal	Moscow, Russia
21:00 CEST (UTC+2)	Zé Luís 34' (pen.), 82'; Dzhikiya (yellow card) 81'; Fernando (yellow card) 83'; Melgarejo 85'; Rasskazov (yellow card) 87'	Report	Toko Ekambi 13'; Fornals 49'; Sansone (yellow card) 52'; Gerard (yellow card) 81'; Cazorla 90+6' (pen.)	Stadium: Otkritie Arena; Attendance: 21,264; Referee: Daniel Siebert (Germany)

25 October 2018 3	Villarreal (Spain)	5–0	(Austria) Rapid Wien	Villarreal, Spain
21:00 CEST (UTC+2)	Trigueros (yellow card) 21'; Fornals 26'; Toko Ekambi 30'; Cáseres (yellow card) 41'; Barać 45' (o.g.); Raba 63'; Costa (yellow card) 73' (yellow-red card) 79'; Gerard 85'	Report	Murg (yellow card) 24'	Stadium: Estadio de la Cerámica; Attendance: 14,158; Referee: Halis Özkahya (Turkey)

8 November 2018 4	Rapid Wien (Austria)	0–0	(Spain) Villarreal	Vienna, Austria
18:55 CET (UTC+1)	Schwab (yellow card) 75'; Berisha (yellow card) 86'; Sonnleitner (yellow card) 87'	Report	Cáseres (yellow card) 43'; Layún (yellow card) 45'; Pedraza (yellow card) 62'; Fornals (yellow card) 85'	Stadium: Allianz Stadion; Attendance: 22,100; Referee: Srđan Jovanović (Serbia)

29 November 2018 5	Rangers (Scotland)	0–0	(Spain) Villarreal	Glasgow, Scotland
21:00 CET (UTC+1)	Candeias (yellow card) 36' (yellow-red card) 45+1'; Flanagan (yellow card) 90'; Middleton (yellow card) 90+5'	Report	Mario Gaspar (yellow card) 35'; Álvaro (yellow card) 90+1'	Stadium: Ibrox Stadium; Attendance: 50,171; Referee: Matej Jug (Slovenia)

13 December 2018 6	Villarreal (Spain)	2–0	(Russia) Spartak Moscow	Villarreal, Spain
18:55 CET (UTC+1)	Chukwueze 11'; Toko Ekambi 48'; Álvaro (yellow card) 71'; Costa (red card) 90'; Fernández (yellow card) 90+2'	Report	Lomovitsky (yellow card) 22'; Zé Luís (yellow card) 85'; Dzhikiya (yellow card) 90'; Kutepov (yellow card) 90+1'	Stadium: Estadio de la Cerámica; Attendance: 12,903; Referee: Andris Treimanis (Latvia)

==== Knockout phase ====
===== Round of 32 =====
14 February 2019 First leg	Sporting CP (Portugal)	0–1	(Spain) Villarreal	Lisbon, Portugal
21:00 CET (UTC+1)	Acuña (yellow card) 6' (yellow-red card) 76'; Luís (yellow card) 15'; Raphinha (yellow card) 45+2'; Fernandes (yellow card) 90+3'; Phellype (yellow card) 90+4'	Report	Pedraza 3'; Fernández (yellow card) 72'; Cáseres (yellow card) 90+2'	Stadium: Estádio José Alvalade; Attendance: 27,134; Referee: Clément Turpin (France)

21 February 2019 Second leg	Villarreal (Spain)	1–1 (2–1 agg.)	(Portugal) Sporting CP	Villarreal, Spain
18:55 CET (UTC+1)	Gerard (yellow card) 51'; Fornals 80'	Report	Jefferson (yellow card) 35' (yellow-red card) 50'; Fernandes 45+1'; Ilori (yellow card) 51'	Stadium: Estadio de la Cerámica; Attendance: 14,098; Referee: Pavel Královec (Czech Republic)

===== Round of 16 =====
7 March 2019 First leg	Zenit Saint Petersburg (Russia)	1–3	(Spain) Villarreal	Saint Petersburg, Russia
18:55 CET (UTC+1)	Azmoun 35'; Barrios (yellow card) 37'; Smolnikov (yellow card) 76'	Report	Costa (yellow card) 14'; Iborra 33'; Gerard 64'; Miguelón (yellow card) 68'; Morlanes 71'	Stadium: Krestovsky Stadium; Attendance: 51,826; Referee: Gianluca Rocchi (Italy)

14 March 2019 Second leg	Villarreal (Spain)	2–1 (5–2 agg.)	(Russia) Zenit Saint Petersburg	Villarreal, Spain
21:00 CET (UTC+1)	Gerard 29'; Bacca 47'; Ruiz (yellow card) 52'; Costa (yellow card) 82'	Report	Shatov (yellow card) 56'; Ivanović 90+1'	Stadium: Estadio de la Cerámica; Attendance: 14,027; Referee: Artur Soares Dias (Portugal)

===== Quarter-finals =====
11 April 2019 First leg	Villarreal (Spain)	1–3	(Spain) Valencia	Villarreal, Spain
21:00 CEST (UTC+2)	Cazorla (yellow card) 28', (goal) 36' (pen.); Álvaro (yellow card) 62'; Quintillà (yellow card) 84'	Report	Guedes 6', 90+3'; Gayà (yellow card) 39'; Wass 90+1'	Stadium: Estadio de la Cerámica; Attendance: 17,605; Referee: Michael Oliver (England)

18 April 2019 Second leg	Valencia (Spain)	2–0 (5–1 agg.)	(Spain) Villarreal	Valencia, Spain
21:00 CEST (UTC+2)	Lato 13'; Parejo 54'; Coquelin (yellow card) 88'	Report	Raba (yellow card) 24'; Pedraza (yellow card) 34'; Funes Mori (yellow card) 53'; Ratiu (yellow card) 61'	Stadium: Mestalla; Attendance: 26,403; Referee: Willie Collum (Scotland)

== Statistics ==
=== Appearances and goals ===
Last updated on 19 May 2019.

No.	Pos	Nat	Player	Total		La Liga		Copa del Rey		Europa League	
No.	Pos	Nat	Player	Apps	Goals	Apps	Goals	Apps	Goals	Apps	Goals
Goalkeepers
1	GK	(Spain) ESP	Sergio Asenjo	32	0	32	0	0	0	0	0
13	GK	(Spain) ESP	Andrés Fernández	22	0	6	0	4	0	12	0
25	GK	(Argentina) ARG	Mariano Barbosa	0	0	0	0	0	0	0	0
Defenders
2	DF	(Spain) ESP	Mario Gaspar	40	1	30+1	1	1	0	8	0
3	DF	(Spain) ESP	Álvaro	41	1	33	1	1	0	7	0
4	DF	(Argentina) ARG	Ramiro Funes Mori	42	2	29+2	2	1	0	9+1	0
6	DF	(Spain) ESP	Víctor Ruiz	33	0	22	0	1	0	10	0
11	DF	(Spain) ESP	Jaume Costa	29	1	18+3	1	2	0	6	0
15	DF	(Spain) ESP	Miguelón	16	0	5+3	0	2+1	0	4+1	0
23	DF	(Italy) ITA	Daniele Bonera	11	0	4+1	0	3	0	3	0
33	DF	(Spain) ESP	Pepe Castaño	1	0	0	0	1	0	0	0
38	DF	(Romania) ROU	Andrei Rațiu	1	0	0	0	0	0	1	0
39	DF	(Spain) ESP	Xavi Quintillà	9	0	7	0	1	0	1	0
Midfielders
5	MF	(Argentina) ARG	Santiago Cáseres	34	0	17+6	0	2	0	7+2	0
8	MF	(Spain) ESP	Pablo Fornals	50	5	28+7	2	0+3	0	10+2	3
10	MF	(Spain) ESP	Vicente Iborra	25	4	19	3	0+1	0	3+2	1
14	MF	(Spain) ESP	Manu Trigueros	34	0	18+6	0	2+1	0	6+1	0
16	MF	(Spain) ESP	Alfonso Pedraza	45	4	22+12	3	2+1	0	6+2	1
18	MF	(Spain) ESP	Javi Fuego	11	0	3+2	0	2	0	3+1	0
19	MF	(Spain) ESP	Santi Cazorla	46	7	30+5	4	1	1	3+7	2
21	MF	(Spain) ESP	Bruno	0	0	0	0	0	0	0	0
22	MF	(Spain) ESP	Dani Raba	17	2	2+6	0	4	1	4+1	1
28	MF	(Spain) ESP	Manu Morlanes	16	1	7+3	0	1	0	3+2	1
30	MF	(Nigeria) NGR	Samuel Chukwueze	38	8	19+7	5	2+1	2	5+4	1
37	MF	(Spain) ESP	Iván Martín	1	0	0	0	0+1	0	0	0
Forwards
7	FW	(Spain) ESP	Gerard Moreno	49	13	25+10	8	0+3	1	7+4	4
9	FW	(Colombia) COL	Carlos Bacca	43	11	12+21	6	3	3	4+3	2
17	FW	(Cameroon) CMR	Karl Toko Ekambi	43	18	24+10	10	2	5	5+2	3
Players who have made an appearance or had a squad number this season but have left the club
10	FW	(Italy) ITA	Nicola Sansone	7	1	0+3	1	1	0	3	0
20	MF	(Chile) CHI	Manuel Iturra	4	0	1+2	0	1	0	0	0
24	DF	(Mexico) MEX	Miguel Layún	15	0	5+3	0	4	0	2+1	0
-	MF	(Uruguay) URU	Ramiro Guerra	0	0	0	0	0	0	0	0
-	FW	(Argentina) ARG	Leonardo Suárez	0	0	0	0	0	0	0	0
-	FW	(Turkey) TUR	Enes Ünal	0	0	0	0	0	0	0	0
-	FW	(Spain) ESP	Matías Nahuel	0	0	0	0	0	0	0	0
