= Alfonso Pedraza =

Spanish footballer (born 1996)

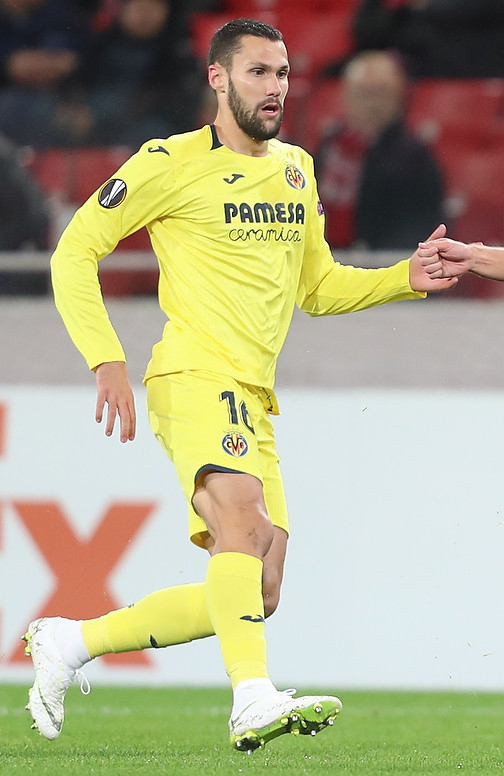
- Pedraza with Villarreal in 2018

Personal information
- Full name: Alfonso Pedraza Sag
- Date of birth: 9 April 1996 (age 30)
- Place of birth: San Sebastián de los Ballesteros, Spain
- Height: 1.84 m (6 ft 0 in)
- Positions: Left-back; winger

Team information
- Current team: Lazio
- Number: 23

Youth career
- Séneca
- 2011–2015: Villarreal

Senior career*
| Years | Team | Apps | (Gls) |
| 2015 | Villarreal C | 1 | (0) |
| 2015–2016 | Villarreal B | 41 | (7) |
| 2015–2026 | Villarreal | 179 | (10) |
| 2016–2017 | → Lugo (loan) | 23 | (6) |
| 2017 | → Leeds United (loan) | 14 | (1) |
| 2017–2018 | → Alavés (loan) | 33 | (3) |
| 2019–2020 | → Betis (loan) | 22 | (1) |
| 2026– | Lazio | 7 | (0) |

International career
| 2015 | Spain U19 | 7 | (3) |
| 2016–2019 | Spain U21 | 14 | (0) |
| 2023 | Spain | 1 | (0) |
Medal record
Men's football
Representing Spain
UEFA European Under-21 Championship
| Winner | 2019 Italy |
UEFA European Under-19 Championship
| Winner | 2015 Greece |
- * Club domestic league appearances and goals as of 21:42, 24 October 2026 (UTC)

Alfonso Pedraza Sag (Spanish pronunciation: [alˈfonso peˈðɾaθa ˈsaɣ]; born 9 April 1996) is a Spanish professional footballer who plays as a left-back or left winger for Serie A club Lazio.

Brought up at Villarreal, he went on to play as a senior for that club as well as Lugo, Leeds United, Alavés, Betis and Lazio. He won the 2020–21 Europa League with Villarreal, where he made 235 total appearances and scored 13 goals.

Pedraza won the 2019 European Under-21 Championship with Spain. He made his full debut in 2023.

== Club career ==
=== Villarreal ===
Born in San Sebastián de los Ballesteros, Córdoba, Andalusia, Pedraza joined Villarreal CF's youth setup in 2011 at the age of 15, after starting out at Séneca CF. In January 2015, he was promoted to the former's C team in the Tercera División.

Pedraza made his Segunda División B debut on 11 January 2015, appearing as a second-half substitute for the reserves in a 2–2 away draw against CF Reus Deportiu. He scored his first goal on 1 March, the game's only in a home victory over CD Atlético Baleares.

On 5 April 2015, after being already a regular with the B's and being called up to the main squad by manager Marcelino García Toral, Pedraza made his professional – and La Liga – debut, replacing Jonathan dos Santos in the 72nd minute of a 0–0 draw at Valencia CF. On 28 July 2016, he was loaned to Segunda División side CD Lugo for one year, scoring his first professional goal on 21 August by netting the first in a 2–2 away draw with Gimnàstic de Tarragona. He ended the season with a further five and eight assists, helping to a final ninth position.

On 31 January 2017, Pedraza joined Leeds United on loan until the end of the campaign, with Villarreal paying Lugo £300,000 in order to cancel his contract with them – the deal with the English side included an option to buy for £8.5 million in May, provided they won promotion from the EFL Championship. After featuring from the bench in his debut, a 2–1 loss at Huddersfield Town, he scored his first goal on 3 March in a 3–1 away win over Birmingham City; as the team could only rank seventh, he returned to the Estadio de la Cerámica.

On 5 July 2017, still owned by Villarreal, Pedraza signed with Deportivo Alavés for one year with a buyout clause. He scored his first goal in the Spanish top flight on 21 January 2018, putting the hosts ahead 2–0 in an eventual 2–2 home draw against CD Leganés.

Upon returning from loan, Pedraza was regularly deployed as a left-back by manager Javier Calleja, and was definitely included in Villarreal's first team. On 4 November 2018, he scored his first goal for the club to earn a 1–1 home draw against Levante UD in a local derby. The following 14 February, he scored the only goal after three minutes in a victory at Sporting CP in the last 32 of the UEFA Europa League.

On 16 July 2019, Pedraza moved to Real Betis on a one-year loan, with an option to make the deal permanent at the end of the season. From December to March, he suffered from muscular and Achilles tendon injuries. His only goal for the Seville-based side came on 8 July 2020 in a 3–0 home defeat of CA Osasuna that ensured another season in the top flight; on 24 September, he extended his contract until 2025 after having his role in the team guaranteed by new manager Unai Emery.

Pedraza made 44 appearances in the 2020–21 campaign, including 12 in the victorious run in the Europa League and 88 minutes of the final against Manchester United. He spent most of 2024 and several months of the following year sidelined by an ankle injury, however.

=== Lazio ===
On 3 July 2026, Serie A club Lazio announced the signing of Pedraza as a free agent on a three-year contract. He made his debut on 16 August, in a 2–0 home loss to Mantova 1911 in the first round of the Coppa Italia.

== International career ==
In 2015, Pedraza was part of the Spain under-19 squad that won the UEFA European Championship. He earned his first cap for the under-21s on 24 March 2016 of the following year, coming on for Dani Ceballos early in the second half of an eventual 0–3 home loss against Croatia in the 2017 European Championship qualifiers. In the 2019 edition of the latter tournament, he appeared in the 2–1 group-stage win over Belgium for the eventual champions.

Pedraza made his full debut on 15 October 2023, playing ten minutes as a left winger in the 1–0 victory in Norway for the UEFA Euro 2024 qualifying phase after replacing Ferran Torres.

== Style of play ==
Pedraza played mainly as a left winger, but could also operate on the opposite flank cutting inside or as a forward. His style of play was compared to Gareth Bale due to his speed running with the ball, as well as his strength and ability to take on defenders.

Spanish football expert Guillem Balagué described Pedraza upon signing for Leeds: "It’s one of the most exciting transfers of the winter... He’s a 20-year-old, he mirrors himself on Denis Cheryshev – a winger who goes forward and works really hard. And he’s a goalscorer".

== Career statistics ==
As of match played 24 October 2026

Appearances and goals by club, season and competition
| Club | Season | League | | | National cup | | Europe | | Other | | Total | |
| Club | Season | Division | Apps | Goals | Apps | Goals | Apps | Goals | Apps | Goals | Apps | Goals |
|---|---|---|---|---|---|---|---|---|---|---|---|---|
| Villarreal B | 2014–15 | Segunda División B | 13 | 1 | — | | — | | — | | 13 | 1 |
| Villarreal B | 2015–16 | Segunda División B | 28 | 6 | — | | — | | 2 (Note: Appearances in Segunda División B promotion play-offs) | 0 | 30 | 6 |
| Villarreal B | Total | | 41 | 7 | 0 | 0 | 0 | 0 | 2 | 0 | 43 | 7 |
| Villarreal | 2014–15 | La Liga | 2 | 0 | 0 | 0 | — | | — | | 2 | 0 |
| Villarreal | 2015–16 | La Liga | 2 | 0 | 0 | 0 | 1 (Note: Appearances in UEFA Europa League) | 0 | — | | 3 | 0 |
| Villarreal | 2018–19 | La Liga | 34 | 3 | 3 | 0 | 8 | 1 | — | | 45 | 4 |
| Villarreal | 2020–21 | La Liga | 29 | 1 | 3 | 1 | 12 | 0 | — | | 44 | 2 |
| Villarreal | 2021–22 | La Liga | 28 | 4 | 2 | 0 | 10 (Note: Appearances in UEFA Champions League) | 0 | 1 (Note: Appearance in UEFA Super Cup) | 0 | 41 | 4 |
| Villarreal | 2022–23 | La Liga | 26 | 0 | 1 | 0 | 2 (Note: Appearances in UEFA Europa Conference League) | 1 | — | | 29 | 1 |
| Villarreal | 2023–24 | La Liga | 19 | 1 | 1 | 0 | 4 | 0 | — | | 24 | 1 |
| Villarreal | 2024–25 | La Liga | 12 | 0 | 0 | 0 | — | | — | | 12 | 0 |
| Villarreal | 2025–26 | La Liga | 27 | 1 | 3 | 0 | 5 | 0 | — | | 35 | 1 |
| Villarreal | Total | | 179 | 10 | 13 | 1 | 42 | 2 | 1 | 0 | 235 | 13 |
| Lugo (loan) | 2016–17 | Segunda División | 23 | 6 | 0 | 0 | — | | — | | 23 | 6 |
| Leeds United (loan) | 2016–17 | Championship | 14 | 1 | 0 | 0 | — | | — | | 14 | 1 |
| Alavés (loan) | 2017–18 | La Liga | 33 | 3 | 4 | 1 | — | | — | | 37 | 4 |
| Betis (loan) | 2019–20 | La Liga | 22 | 1 | 0 | 0 | — | | — | | 22 | 1 |
| Lazio | 2026–27 | Serie A | 7 | 0 | 1 | 0 | — | | 0 | 0 | 8 | 0 |
| Career total | | | 319 | 28 | 18 | 2 | 42 | 2 | 3 | 0 | 382 | 32 |

== Honours ==
Villarreal

- UEFA Europa League: 2020–21

Spain U19

- UEFA European Under-19 Championship: 2015

Spain U21

- UEFA European Under-21 Championship: 2019

Individual

- UEFA Europa League Squad of the Season: 2020–21
