= Alberto Bueno =

Spanish footballer (born 1988)

Personal information
- Full name: Alberto Bueno Calvo
- Date of birth: 20 March 1988 (age 38)
- Place of birth: Madrid, Spain
- Height: 1.79 m (5 ft 10 in)
- Positions: Forward; winger

Team information
- Current team: Leganés (youth)

Youth career
- Concepción
- 2001–2006: Real Madrid

Senior career*
Years	Team	Apps	(Gls)
2006–2009	Real Madrid B	97	(22)
2008–2009	Real Madrid	3	(0)
2009–2013	Valladolid	85	(13)
2010–2011	→ Derby County (loan)	29	(5)
2013–2015	Rayo Vallecano	72	(28)
2015–2019	Porto	4	(0)
2016–2017	→ Granada (loan)	13	(1)
2017	→ Leganés (loan)	11	(1)
2018	→ Málaga (loan)	11	(0)
2018	Porto B	1	(0)
2019	→ Boavista (loan)	15	(2)
2019–2020	Boavista	19	(3)
2021	Volos	9	(2)
2021–2022	Ionikos	3	(0)
2022	Algeciras	13	(0)
Total		385	(77)

International career
2004	Spain U16	4	(4)
2004–2005	Spain U17	6	(3)
2006–2007	Spain U19	13	(11)
2007	Spain U20	4	(1)
2008	Spain U21	1	(0)

Managerial career
- 2025–2026: Leganés (assistant)
- 2026–: Leganés (youth)
- * Club domestic league appearances and goals

Alberto Bueno Calvo (Spanish pronunciation: [alˈβeɾto ˈβweno]; (Note: In isolation, Bueno is pronounced [ˈbweno].) born 20 March 1988) is a Spanish former professional footballer who played mainly as a forward but also as a left winger.

After starting out at Real Madrid, he went on to represent mainly Valladolid and Rayo Vallecano, amassing La Liga totals of 164 matches and 36 goals over seven seasons. He also played in England, Portugal and Greece.

Bueno earned 28 caps for Spain at youth level all categories comprised, scoring 19 goals.

== Club career ==
=== Real Madrid ===
Born in Madrid, Bueno was a product of Real Madrid's youth system, and he started playing for the Juvenil team, scoring 37 goals in 37 matches. The following season, he progressed to Real Madrid Castilla, appearing in 31 games in the Segunda División.

In August 2007, Real Madrid signed Bueno on a professional contract with the first team. He was called up to pre-season training under coach Bernd Schuster, taking the field in a friendly with FC Lokomotiv Moscow and being by replaced at half-time by another cantera player, Javier Balboa.

On 11 November 2008, due to many injuries to the main squad, Bueno was given his official debut, in a Copa del Rey tie against Real Unión (Segunda División B): within minutes of his entry, 15 minutes into the second half, he scored in a 4–3 final win, but Real Madrid suffered a shock exit from the competition (6–6 on aggregate). He made his La Liga debut 11 days later, replacing Raúl late into a 1–0 home victory over Recreativo de Huelva.

=== Valladolid ===
On 15 July 2009, Bueno signed a five-year contract with Real Valladolid, with Real Madrid having an option to repurchase him in the first two. He was used intermittently during his first season, as the Castile and León side also suffered top-flight relegation.

On 30 August 2010, Derby County announced that Bueno was a guest at the Rams' 2–2 draw against Queens Park Rangers, and that a loan deal was very close to being completed in time for the close of the transfer window. The following day, the player joined on a season-long loan.

Bueno made his debut as a substitute in a 0–1 home loss against Sheffield United, and his first start in a 2–0 defeat at Hull City, then helped spark a run of six unbeaten matches as Derby earned 14 points from a possible 18 – after just one win in the first four games – earning praise from first-team coach Gary Crosby, who said: "Alberto is a natural footballer – his awareness, his touch and his ability are outstanding at times."

Playing as one of three support strikers in Derby's 4–2–3–1 formation, Bueno grabbed his first Championship goals for the club with a brace against Crystal Palace, and followed it up with the second in a 3–0 win over Preston North End, earning the player of the match award in both games. His form was such he was linked with a move to Premier League's Wigan Athletic, but Derby dismissed the link, stating "There is no clause in the loan agreement which allows (Bueno) to leave during the January transfer window."

After a promising start, Bueno, and the team as a whole, faded throughout the rest of the campaign, winning just four of 26 league games and dropping from fourth in the table to 19th. He contributed with only two goals in the final seven months, in defeats against Ipswich Town and Norwich City, and at the end of the season Clough stated himself "unsure" over the player's future, saying his signature was "not a priority".

Bueno subsequently returned to Valladolid, scoring seven times from 32 appearances to help it return to the top flight after two years. He added five in the following season, in an eventual escape from relegation.

=== Rayo Vallecano ===
Bueno signed with Rayo Vallecano in the summer of 2013, for two years. On 28 February 2015, he scored four goals in only 14 minutes in a 4–2 league home win over Levante UD, being the second fastest to accomplish this feat after Bebeto in 1995.

=== Porto ===
On 25 May 2015, free agent Bueno signed with FC Porto for five years, joining a host of compatriots at the Portuguese club including manager Julen Lopetegui. He spent most of his first season on the sidelines, due to a meniscus injury.

On 31 August 2016, Bueno returned to Spain and its first division after agreeing to a one-year loan deal at Granada CF. He scored his only goal for the team on 16 September, in a 2–2 draw at neighbouring Real Betis.

Bueno went back to his hometown on 31 January 2017, as he joined CD Leganés halfway through their debut top-flight campaign. Mostly used as a substitute, he only scored in a 4–0 home win over Deportivo de La Coruña on 25 February, as relegation was avoided.

In early January 2018, still owned by Porto, Bueno signed with Málaga CF until 30 June. Deemed surplus to requirements by Porto manager Sérgio Conceição, he was assigned to the reserves in the Segunda Liga until his situation was resolved.

=== Boavista ===
On 26 January 2019, Bueno was loaned across the city to Boavista F.C. until the end of the season, and scored a free kick in a 3–1 home win over C.D. Feirense on his debut on 2 February. In an interview with Radio Marca in his homeland the following month, he accused his parent club of workplace bullying.

Though a clause in his contract gave him the freedom to leave if he received a satisfactory offer from a Spanish top-flight team, Bueno committed himself to the side from the Estádio do Bessa for the 2019–20 campaign.

=== Later career ===
Bueno signed with Volos FC of Super League Greece in January 2021. In the ensuing off-season, he joined newly promoted Ionikos FC.

On 27 February 2022, Bueno moved to Primera Federación side Algeciras CF. After retiring, he continued playing football in Gerard Piqué's Kings League, with 1K FC, Porcinos FC and Ultimate Móstoles.

== International career ==
Bueno was part of the Spain under-19 team which won the 2006 UEFA European Championship. He was the top scorer of the competition with five goals, with another Real Madrid product, Juan Mata, adding four.

Subsequently, Bueno represented the nation at the 2007 FIFA U-20 World Cup in Canada. He scored in extra time as the team defeated Brazil 4–2 in a last-16 match in Burnaby.

== Honours ==
Spain U19

- UEFA European Under-19 Championship: 2006
