= EF Concepción =

Concepción
- Full name: Escuela de Fútbol Concepción
- Founded: 1962
- Ground: Polideportivo Municipal, Madrid, Community of Madrid, Spain
- Capacity: 1,000
- Chairman: (Spain) Maria Vázquez
- Manager: (Spain) David Gil
- League: Primera Autonómica de Aficionados – Group 1
- 2024–25: Preferente de Aficionados – Group 2, 1st of 18 (champions)
Home colours	Away colours

Escuela de Fútbol Concepción is a football team based in Madrid in the autonomous community of Community of Madrid. It plays in the Primera Autonómica de Aficionados – Group 1. Its stadium is Polideportivo Municipal with a capacity of 1,000 seats.

== History ==
=== Club background ===
- Agrupación Deportiva Pueblo Nuevo (1962–1983)
- Escuelas de Fútbol Concepción-Pueblo Nuevo (1983–1987)
- Escuela de Fútbol Concepción (1987–)

== Season to season ==
Season	Tier	Division	Place	Copa del Rey
1962–63	6	3ª Reg.	7th	
1963–64	5	2ª Reg.	11th	
1964–65	5	2ª Reg.	17th	
1965–66	6	3ª Reg.	14th	
1966–67	6	3ª Reg.	(R)	
1967–68	6	3ª Reg.	14th	
1968–69	6	3ª Reg.	16th	
1969–70	DNP			
1970–71	7	3ª Reg.	7th	
1971–72	7	3ª Reg.	3rd	
1972–73	6	3ª Reg. P.	14th	
1973–74	7	3ª Reg. P.	3rd	
1974–75	6	2ª Reg.	18th	
1975–76	7	3ª Reg. P.	4th	
1976–77	DNP			
1977–78	8	3ª Reg. P.	2nd	
1978–79	7	2ª Reg.	13th	
1979–80	7	2ª Reg.	18th	
1980–81	8	3ª Reg. P.	8th	
1981–82	8	3ª Reg. P.	7th	

Season	Tier	Division	Place	Copa del Rey
1982–83	7	2ª Reg.	14th	
1983–84	7	2ª Reg.	9th	
1984–85	7	2ª Reg.	1st	
1985–86	6	1ª Reg.	10th	
1986–87	6	1ª Reg.	3rd	
1987–88	5	Reg. Pref.	12th	
1988–89	5	Reg. Pref.	10th	
1989–90	5	Reg. Pref.	4th	
1990–91	5	Reg. Pref.	17th	
1991–92	6	1ª Reg.	7th	
1992–93	6	1ª Reg.	11th	
1993–94	6	1ª Reg.	2nd	
1994–95	5	Reg. Pref.	17th	
1995–96	6	1ª Reg.	13th	
1996–97	6	1ª Reg.	3rd	
1997–98	6	1ª Reg.	10th	
1998–99	6	1ª Reg.	2nd	
1999–2000	5	Reg. Pref.	14th	
2000–01	5	Reg. Pref.	18th	
2001–02	6	1ª Reg.	16th	

Season	Tier	Division	Place	Copa del Rey
2002–03	7	2ª Reg.	10th	
2003–04	7	2ª Reg.	1st	
2004–05	6	1ª Reg.	9th	
2005–06	6	1ª Reg.	13th	
2006–07	6	1ª Reg.	18th	
2007–08	7	2ª Reg.	7th	
2008–09	7	2ª Reg.	5th	
2009–10	7	2ª Afic.	1st	
2010–11	6	1ª Afic.	7th	
2011–12	6	1ª Afic.	16th	
2012–13	7	2ª Afic.	4th	
2013–14	7	2ª Afic.	1st	
2014–15	6	1ª Afic.	3rd	
2015–16	6	1ª Afic.	8th	
2016–17	6	1ª Afic.	1st	
2017–18	5	Pref.	12th	
2018–19	5	Pref.	3rd	
2019–20	5	Pref.	16th	
2020–21	5	Pref.	12th	
2021–22	6	Pref.	5th	

Season	Tier	Division	Place	Copa del Rey
2022–23	6	Pref.	10th	
2023–24	6	Pref.	16th	
2024–25	7	Pref. Afic.	1st	
2025–26	6	1ª Aut.		

== Former players ==
- (Spain) Alberto Bueno
- (Spain) Mario Hermoso
