= Óscar Duarte (footballer, born 1989) =

Costa Rican footballer

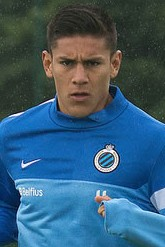
- Duarte with Club Brugge in 2014

Personal information
- Full name: Óscar Esaú Duarte Gaitán
- Date of birth: 3 June 1989 (age 37)
- Place of birth: Catarina, Nicaragua
- Height: 1.86 m (6 ft 1 in)
- Position: Centre-back

Team information
- Current team: Saprissa
- Number: 6

Youth career
- –2008: Saprissa

Senior career*
Years	Team	Apps	(Gls)
2008–2013	Saprissa	48	(2)
2010	→ Puntarenas (loan)	15	(1)
2013–2016	Club Brugge	84	(7)
2016–2019	Espanyol	51	(1)
2019–2022	Levante	60	(3)
2022–2024	Al-Wehda	46	(4)
2024–	Saprissa	24	(5)

International career^{‡}
2010–2023	Costa Rica	76	(4)
- * Club domestic league appearances and goals as of 21 May 2025 ‡ National team caps and goals as of 25 March 2023

Óscar Esaú Duarte Gaitán (born 3 June 1989) is a professional footballer who plays as a centre-back for Saprissa. Born in Nicaragua, he represents the Costa Rica national team.

Formed at Deportivo Saprissa in Costa Rica, he moved to Europe in 2013 to play for Club Brugge in Belgium. He spent seven years in Spain's La Liga with Espanyol and Levante, making 111 appearances and scoring four goals.

Duarte made his international debut for Costa Rica in 2010. He represented the nation at three FIFA World Cups, three CONCACAF Gold Cups and two editions of the Copa América.

== Club career ==
=== Early career ===
Duarte was born in Catarina, Masaya, Nicaragua. After making 52 appearances in five years at Costa Rican club Deportivo Saprissa, Duarte joined Club Brugge in the Belgian Pro League in 2013.

=== Espanyol ===
On 26 January 2016, Duarte agreed a permanent transfer to RCD Espanyol in Spain. The three-year deal cost the club €1.15 million and included a buyout clause of €15 million. He made his debut five days later, coming on at half time and scoring an own goal in a 6–0 loss at Real Madrid. In his next game on 14 February, he scored his only goal in 57 games for the club from Barcelona, opening a 2–1 loss at Valencia CF.

=== Levante ===
Duarte moved to fellow La Liga team Levante UD on 1 August 2019, on a two-year deal, though the signing was not registered for three more weeks due to UEFA Financial Fair Play Regulations. His first season in the city of Valencia was marred by serious injuries; on 21 January 2020 he scored his first goal to equalise in a 3–1 loss at Sevilla FC in the last 32 of the Copa del Rey. He missed only three league games in 2020–21, scoring in two minutes to open a 4–3 home win over Real Betis on 29 December.

On 30 April 2021, Duarte added another year to his Levante contract by playing his 26th game of the season, against RC Celta de Vigo. He chose to let his deal expire in May 2022.

=== Al-Wehda ===
On 24 June 2022, Duarte joined Saudi Arabian club Al-Wehda.

== International career ==
He was eligible to play for Nicaragua through his mother's family, and Costa Rica through his father's family.

Duarte made his debut for the Costa Rica national team against Jamaica on 17 November 2010 and played for the team at the 2011 Copa Centroamericana, where they lost to Honduras in the final.

In June 2014, Duarte was named in Costa Rica's squad for the 2014 FIFA World Cup, becoming the first Nicaragua-born player at a World Cup finals.

In the team's opening match, he scored his first goal for Los Ticos in a 3–1 defeat of Uruguay. In their second match, the team beat Italy, a 1–0 win that qualified Costa Rica for the knockout stage. Costa Rica completed the group stage unbeaten, recording a second consecutive clean sheet in a 0–0 draw with England in Belo Horizonte. On 29 June, Duarte was sent off for receiving two yellow cards in Costa Rica's round of 16 match against Greece. The team advanced via a penalty shootout to the quarter-finals for the first time in their history, where they lost on penalties to the Netherlands.

In May 2018 he was named in Costa Rica's 23-man squad for the 2018 FIFA World Cup in Russia.

== Career statistics ==
=== Club ===
As of match played 22 May 2024

Appearances and goals by club, season and competition
Club	Season	League			Cup		Continental		Other		Total	
Club	Season	Division	Apps	Goals	Apps	Goals	Apps	Goals	Apps	Goals	Apps	Goals
Saprissa	2010–11	Primera División	5	0	—		3 (Note: Appearance(s) in CONCACAF Champions Cup)	0	—		8	0
Saprissa	2011–12	Primera División	27	1	—		—		—		27	1
Saprissa	2012–13	Primera División	16	2	—		—		—		16	2
Saprissa	Total		48	3	—		3	0	—		51	3
Puntarenas (loan)	2010–11	Primera División	15	1	—		—		—		15	1
Club Brugge	2012–13	Belgian Pro League	17	3	—		—		—		17	3
Club Brugge	2013–14	Belgian Pro League	22	0	1	0	2 (Note: Appearance(s) in UEFA Europa League)	1	—		25	1
Club Brugge	2014–15	Belgian Pro League	31	4	5	0	15	1	—		51	5
Club Brugge	2015–16	Belgian Pro League	14	0	1	0	6 (Note: Four appearances in UEFA Champions League, Two appearances in UEFA Europa League)	0	0	0	21	0
Club Brugge	Total		84	7	6	0	23	2	0	0	113	9
Espanyol	2015–16	La Liga	14	1	—		—		—		14	1
Espanyol	2016–17	La Liga	15	0	2	0	—		—		17	0
Espanyol	2017–18	La Liga	11	0	2	0	—		—		13	0
Espanyol	2018–19	La Liga	11	0	2	0	—		—		13	0
Espanyol	Total		51	1	6	0	—		—		57	1
Levante	2019–20	La Liga	8	0	1	1	—		—		9	1
Levante	2020–21	La Liga	29	1	6	0	—		—		35	1
Levante	2021–22	La Liga	23	2	2	0	—		—		25	2
Levante	Total		60	3	9	1	—		—		69	4
Al Wehda	2022–23	Saudi Pro League	27	2	4	0	—		—		31	2
Al Wehda	2023–24	Saudi Pro League	18	2	1	0	—		0	0	19	2
Al Wehda	Total		45	4	5	0	—		0	0	50	4
Career total			303	19	26	1	26	2	0	0	355	22

=== International ===
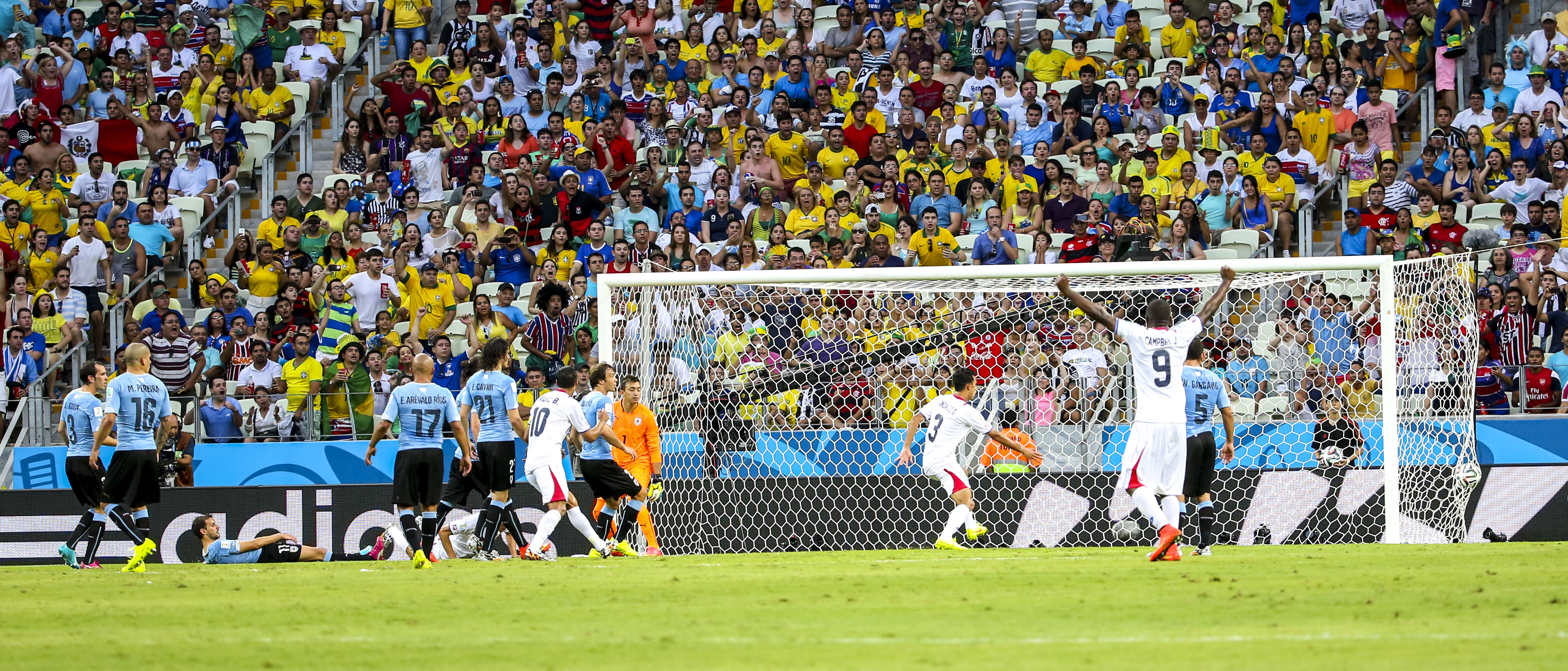
Duarte's goal against Uruguay at the 2014 FIFA World Cup

As of match played 25 March 2023

Appearances and goals by national team and year
National team	Year	Apps	Goals
Costa Rica	2010	1	0
Costa Rica	2011	6	0
Costa Rica	2013	2	0
Costa Rica	2014	11	2
Costa Rica	2015	6	0
Costa Rica	2016	7	0
Costa Rica	2017	2	0
Costa Rica	2018	9	0
Costa Rica	2019	8	0
Costa Rica	2020	4	0
Costa Rica	2021	12	1
Costa Rica	2022	7	1
Costa Rica	2023	1	0
Total		76	4

Scores and results list Costa Rica's goal tally first, score column indicates score after each Duarte goal.

List of international goals scored by Óscar Duarte
No.	Date	Venue	Opponent	Score	Result	Competition
1	14 June 2014	Estádio Castelão, Fortaleza Brazil	Uruguay	2–1	3–1	2014 FIFA World Cup
2	14 October 2014	Seoul World Cup Stadium, Seoul, South Korea	South Korea	3–1	3–1	Friendly
3	16 November 2021	Estadio Nacional, San José, Costa Rica	Honduras	1–0	2–1	2022 FIFA World Cup qualification
4	9 November 2022	Estadio Nacional, San José, Costa Rica	Nigeria	1–0	2–0	Friendly

== Honours ==
Saprissa

- Costa Rican Primera División: Clausura 2008, Apertura 2008

Brugge

- Belgian Pro League: 2015–16
- Belgian Cup: 2014–15
