= Facundo Ferreyra =

Argentine footballer

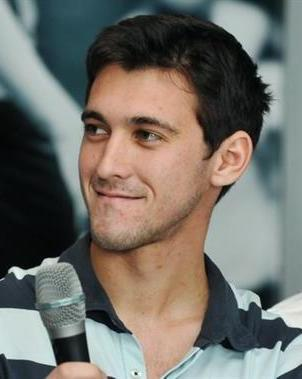
- Ferreyra in 2013

Personal information
- Full name: Facundo Ferreyra
- Date of birth: 14 March 1991 (age 35)
- Place of birth: Lomas de Zamora, Argentina
- Height: 1.85 m (6 ft 1 in)
- Position: Forward

Youth career
- Banfield

Senior career*
Years	Team	Apps	(Gls)
2008–2012	Banfield	56	(15)
2012–2013	Vélez Sársfield	22	(16)
2013–2018	Shakhtar Donetsk	74	(43)
2014–2015	→ Newcastle United (loan)	0	(0)
2018–2021	Benfica	6	(1)
2019–2020	→ Espanyol (loan)	25	(2)
2021	Celta	13	(1)
2022	Tijuana	14	(1)
2022	→ Independiente (loan)	10	(1)
2023	Argentinos Juniors	7	(0)
2023–2024	Sarmiento	10	(0)
2024	Tigre	9	(1)

International career^{‡}
2011	Argentina U20	8	(5)
Medal record
Men's football
Representing Argentina
South American U-20 Championship
Third place	2011
- * Club domestic league appearances and goals as of 16:26, 1 June 2025 (UTC) ‡ National team caps and goals as of 17 February 2019

Facundo Ferreyra (Spanish pronunciation: [faˈkundo feˈrejɾa]; born 14 March 1991), nicknamed "Chucky", is an Argentine professional footballer who plays as a forward.

== Club career ==
=== Banfield ===
Ferreyra came through the youth system at his home town club of Banfield, and was promoted to the first team in the 2008–09 season. He made six appearances in that season, three as a substitute, scoring one goal. His debut goal was a header against Argentinos Juniors in a 2–2 draw on 6 December 2008.

Ferreyra's next first team appearances came in the 2010–11 season, when he scored six goals in 19 games, including one against Boca Juniors to secure a 1–1 draw on 4 June 2011. He was among the 15 top league goalscorers for the season. On 3 January 2011, he signed a new three-year contract with Banfield.

=== Vélez Sársfield ===
Following Banfield's relegation at the end of the 2011–12 Argentine Primera División season, Ferreyra was transferred to Vélez Sársfield. During his first season playing for Vélez, Ferreyra was the top goalscorer for the team in their 2012 Inicial winning campaign, scoring 13 goals in 15 games. He was also joint top scorer of the championship along Ignacio Scocco. Ferreyra also started in the 2012–13 Superfinal, in which Vélez defeated Newell's Old Boys.

=== Shakhtar Donetsk ===
On 9 July 2013, Ferreyra signed a five-year contract with Ukrainian club Shakhtar Donetsk in a US$9 million transfer. He rarely featured for the club during his first season in Ukraine, but did manage to score six league goals from five starts as Shakhtar won their ninth league title.

Due to personal security concerns over the war in Donbas and the recent Malaysia Airlines Flight 17 crash, Ferreyra along with five other foreign teammates refused to return to Ukraine after a friendly match against Lyon on 20 July 2014. With the relocation of Shakhtar's training base to Kyiv and home games to be played in Lviv for the 2014–15 season and following talks with CEO Sergei Palkin, Ferreyra and his teammates returned to the club in late July.

==== Loan to Newcastle United ====
On 3 August 2014, Newcastle United signed Ferreyra on a season-long loan. The deal included a £6 million option to buy at the end of the season. However, Ferreyra struggled with the physical demands of English football, stating in an interview in the Newcastle Evening Chronicle "When I got here [Newcastle] I struggled to adapt ... it is a very physical league." On 29 May 2015 it was announced that Newcastle would not take up the option to buy Ferreyra and he would return to Shakhtar Donetsk without having played a single minute of first team football for Newcastle.

==== Return to Shakhtar ====
Ferreyra scored the first goal in the 2018 Ukrainian Cup Final as Shakhtar beat rivals Dynamo Kyiv 2–0.

=== Benfica ===
On 6 June 2018, Ferreyra signed a four-year contract with Portuguese club S.L. Benfica. The following 31 January, after being rarely used, he moved to La Liga side RCD Espanyol on loan until June 2020. He scored 1 goal in 9 games in La Liga in the second half of the 2018–19 season. In January 2021, Ferreyra and Benfica decided to mutually part ways, making Ferreyra a free-agent.

=== Celta ===
Upon his release from Benfica, Ferreyra signed a contract until the end of the 2020–21 season with Spanish club Celta de Vigo.

== International career ==
Ferreyra is a former Argentina under-20 youth international. He was joint second top scorer at the 2011 South American Youth Championship with four tournament goals, helping Argentina to third place. He also played with the team at the 2011 FIFA U-20 World Cup.

== Career statistics ==
=== Club ===
As of 17 February 2019

Club	Season	League			National Cup (Note: Argentina – Copa Argentina; Ukraine – Ukrainian Cup)		League Cup (Note: England – League Cup; FA Cup)		Super Cup		Continental		Total	
Club	Season	Division	Apps	Goals	Apps	Goals	Apps	Goals	Apps	Goals	Apps	Goals	Apps	Goals
Banfield	2008–09	Primera División	6	1	0	0	0	0	0	0	0	0	6	1
Banfield	2009–10	Primera División	0	0	0	0	0	0	0	0	0	0	0	0
Banfield	2010–11	Primera División	18	6	0	0	0	0	0	0	0	0	18	6
Banfield	2011–12	Primera División	32	8	0	0	0	0	0	0	0	0	32	8
Banfield	Total		56	15	0	0	0	0	0	0	0	0	56	15
Vélez Sársfield	2012–13	Primera División	22	16	0	0	0	0	0	0	3 (Note: Appearances in the Copa Libertadores)	1	25	17
Shakhtar Donetsk	2013–14	Ukrainian Premier League	13	6	2	0	0	0	0	0	7 (Note: Five appearances in the UEFA Champions League, two appearances in the UEFA Europa League)	0	22	6
Shakhtar Donetsk	2015–16	Ukrainian Premier League	11	3	5	2	0	0	0	0	7 (Note: One appearance in the UEFA Champions League, six appearances in the UEFA Europa League)	2 (Note: Two goals in the UEFA Europa League)	23	7
Shakhtar Donetsk	2016–17	Ukrainian Premier League	20	13	1	0	0	0	0	0	7 (Note: Appearances in the UEFA Europa League)	3	28	16
Shakhtar Donetsk	2017–18	Ukrainian Premier League	30	21	3	4	0	0	1	2	8 (Note: Appearances in the UEFA Champions League)	3	42	30
Shakhtar Donetsk	Total		74	43	11	6	0	0	1	2	29	8	115	59
Newcastle United (loan)	2014–15	Premier League	0	0	0	0	0	0	0	0	0	0	0	0
Benfica	2018–19	Primeira Liga	5	1	1	0	0	0	0	0	3 (Note: Appearances in the UEFA Champions League)	0	9	1
Espanyol (loan)	2018–19	La Liga	3	0	0	0	0	0	0	0	0	0	3	0
Career total			160	75	12	6	0	0	1	2	35	9	208	92

== Honours ==
Vélez Sársfield

- Argentine Primera División: 2012 Inicial, 2012–13 Superfinal

Shakhtar Donetsk

- Ukrainian Premier League: 2013–14, 2016–17, 2017–18
- Ukrainian Cup: 2015–16, 2016–17, 2017–18
- Ukrainian Super Cup: 2014, 2015, 2017

Benfica

- Primeira Liga: 2018–19

Argentina U20

- South American Youth Championship third place: 2011

Individual

- Argentine Primera División top scorer: 2012 Inicial
- Ukrainian Premier League top scorer: 2017–18
