= Mario Hermoso =

Spanish footballer (born 1995)

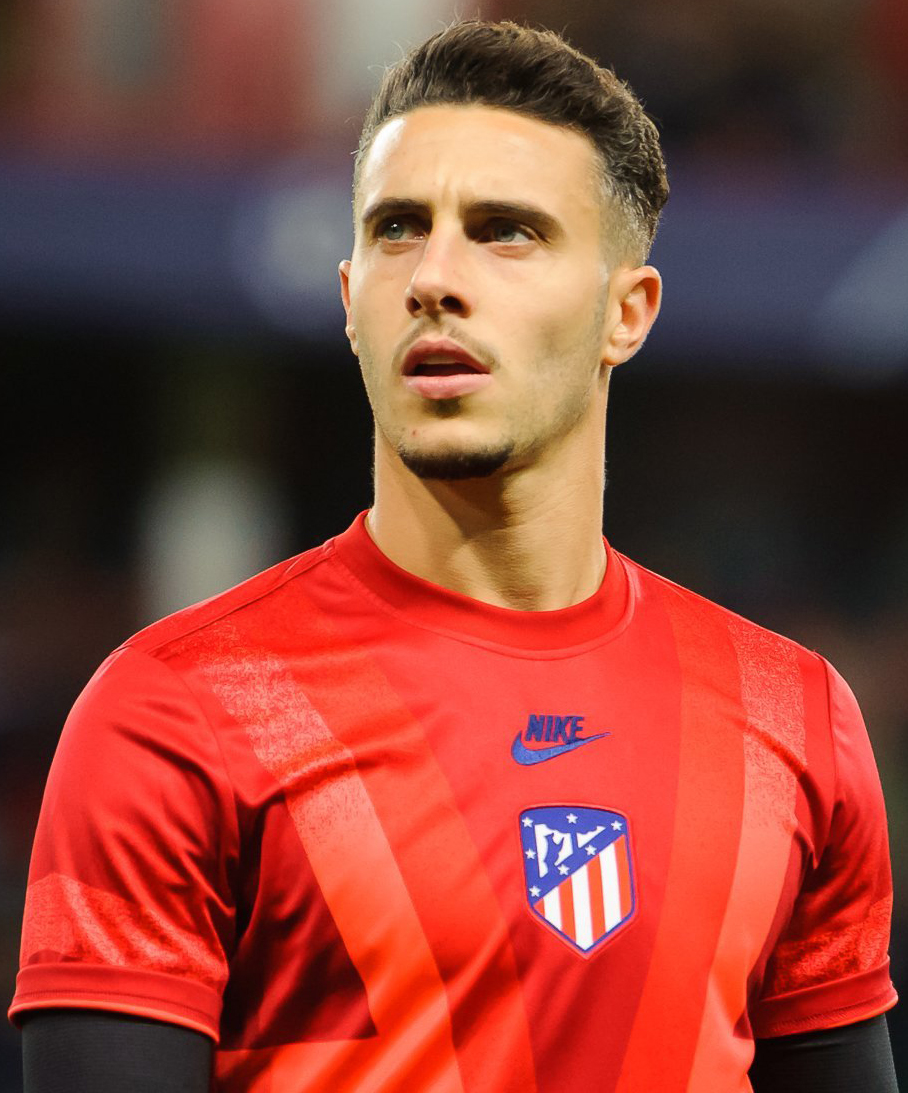
- Hermoso with Atlético Madrid in 2019

Personal information
- Full name: Mario Hermoso Canseco
- Date of birth: 18 June 1995 (age 31)
- Place of birth: Madrid, Spain
- Height: 1.84 m (6 ft 0 in)
- Position: Defender

Team information
- Current team: Roma
- Number: 22

Youth career
- 2002–2006: Concepción
- 2006–2014: Real Madrid

Senior career*
Years	Team	Apps	(Gls)
2014–2015	Real Madrid C	34	(2)
2015–2017	Real Madrid B	33	(1)
2015–2016	→ Valladolid (loan)	31	(0)
2017–2019	Espanyol	54	(4)
2019–2024	Atlético Madrid	131	(6)
2024–	Roma	45	(5)
2025	→ Bayer Leverkusen (loan)	4	(0)

International career
2013–2014	Spain U19	5	(2)
2018–2019	Spain	5	(0)
- * Club domestic league appearances and goals as of 18:18, 8 November 2026 (UTC)

Mario Hermoso Canseco (Spanish pronunciation: [ˈmaɾjo eɾˈmoso kanˈseko]; born 18 June 1995) is a Spanish professional footballer who plays as a centre-back or a left-back for Serie A club Roma.

Developed at Real Madrid, he made his La Liga debut with Espanyol and, in 2019, signed for Atlético Madrid, where he totalled 174 games in five seasons and won the 2020–21 national championship. He joined Roma in summer 2024, serving a loan at Bayer Leverkusen during his contract.

Hermoso earned his first full cap for Spain in 2018.

== Club career ==
=== Real Madrid ===
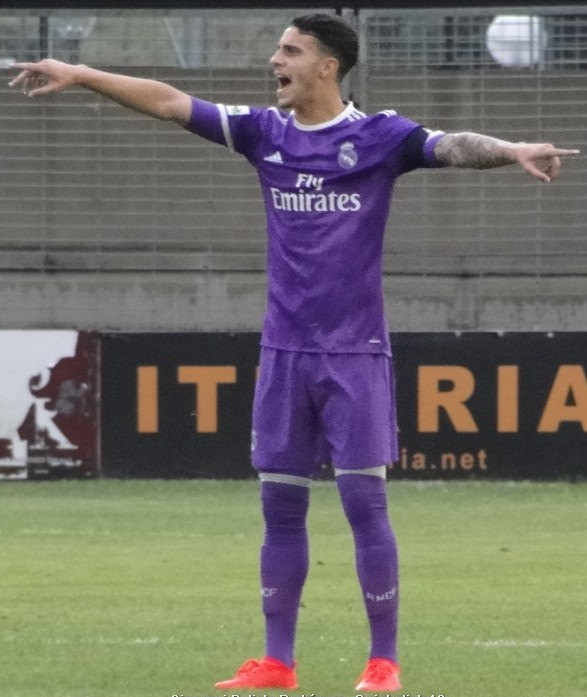
Hermoso playing for Castilla in 2016

Born in Madrid, Hermoso joined Real Madrid's youth setup in 2005, aged 11, after starting out at EF Concepción. On 28 September 2012, while still a youth, he appeared with the first team in that year's Trofeo Santiago Bernabéu, coming on as a second-half substitute in an 8–0 rout of Millonarios.

In summer 2014, Hermoso was promoted to the C side in the Tercera División. On 16 July 2015, he was loaned to Segunda División club Real Valladolid in a season-long deal.

Hermoso made his professional debut on 22 August 2015, starting in a 1–0 away loss against Córdoba. Upon returning, he was assigned to Real's reserves in the Segunda División B.

=== Espanyol ===
On 12 July 2017, Hermoso signed a three-year deal with Espanyol. His maiden appearance in La Liga took place on 9 September, playing the full 90 minutes in a 5–0 defeat at Barcelona. He scored his first goal in the competition the following 28 January, but also put two past his own net in a 3–2 loss away to Leganés.

=== Atlético Madrid ===
On 18 July 2019, with only one year left in his contract, Hermoso agreed to a five-year deal with Atlético Madrid for €25 million plus €4 million in add-ons; Espanyol also retained 20% of any future sale of the player, with half of the fee being paid to Real Madrid. He made his league debut on 18 August, playing 28 minutes in the 1–0 home win against Getafe.

Hermoso scored his first league goal on 22 December 2020, opening a 2–0 away victory over Real Sociedad. He contributed 31 appearances during the season, as the club won its 11th domestic league.

On 7 September 2022, Hermoso scored a last-minute goal to open a 2–1 home defeat of Porto in the group phase of the UEFA Champions League; later, he committed a penalty that resulted in Mateus Uribe's equaliser, before Antoine Griezmann's winner.

Hermoso left the Metropolitano Stadium in June 2024, after his contract expired.

=== Roma ===
On 2 September 2024, Hermoso signed with Roma in Italy. He scored his first goal on 12 December, closing the 3–0 win over Braga in the league phase of the UEFA Europa League.

On 31 January 2025, Hermoso joined Bayer Leverkusen on loan until the end of the campaign. He returned to Roma for the 2025–26 season, scoring his maiden Serie A goal in the 2–1 win over Parma on 29 October 2025.

Hermoso extended his contract with the club in May 2026, until June 2027.

== International career ==
After playing for Spain at under-19 level, Hermoso was first called by the full side on 8 November 2018, for matches against Croatia and Bosnia and Herzegovina. He made his debut in the latter fixture, featuring the full 90 minutes in the 1–0 friendly win in Las Palmas.

Hermoso earned five caps in ten months.

== Career statistics ==
=== Club ===
As of match played 7 November 2026

Appearances and goals by club, season and competition
Club	Season	League			National cup (Note: Includes Copa del Rey, Coppa Italia, DFB-Pokal)		Europe		Other		Total	
Club	Season	Division	Apps	Goals	Apps	Goals	Apps	Goals	Apps	Goals	Apps	Goals
Real Madrid C	2014–15	Tercera División	34	2	—		—		—		34	2
Real Madrid B	2016–17	Segunda División B	33	1	—		—		—		33	1
Valladolid (loan)	2015–16	Segunda División	31	0	0	0	—		—		31	0
Espanyol	2017–18	La Liga	22	1	2	0	—		—		24	1
Espanyol	2018–19	La Liga	32	3	3	0	—		—		35	3
Espanyol	Total		54	4	5	0	—		—		59	4
Atlético Madrid	2019–20	La Liga	17	0	1	0	5 (Note: Appearances in UEFA Champions League)	0	0	0	23	0
Atlético Madrid	2020–21	La Liga	31	1	1	0	6	1	—		38	2
Atlético Madrid	2021–22	La Liga	26	2	1	0	6	0	1 (Note: Appearance in Supercopa de España)	0	34	2
Atlético Madrid	2022–23	La Liga	26	3	5	0	3	1	—		34	4
Atlético Madrid	2023–24	La Liga	31	0	4	0	9	1	1	1	45	2
Atlético Madrid	Total		131	6	12	0	29	3	2	1	174	10
Roma	2024–25	Serie A	8	0	1	0	4 (Note: Appearances in UEFA Europa League)	1	—		13	1
Roma	2025–26	Serie A	27	3	1	1	7	0	—		35	4
Roma	2026–27	Serie A	10	2	0	0	4	1	—		14	3
Roma	Total		45	5	2	1	15	2	—		62	8
Bayer Leverkusen (loan)	2024–25	Bundesliga	4	0	1	0	3	0	—		8	0
Career total			332	18	20	1	47	5	2	1	401	25

=== International ===
Appearances and goals by national team and year
National team	Year	Apps	Goals
Spain	2018	1	0
Spain	2019	4	0
Total		5	0

== Honours ==
Atlético Madrid

- La Liga: 2020–21
