= Pablo Fornals =

Spanish footballer (born 1996)

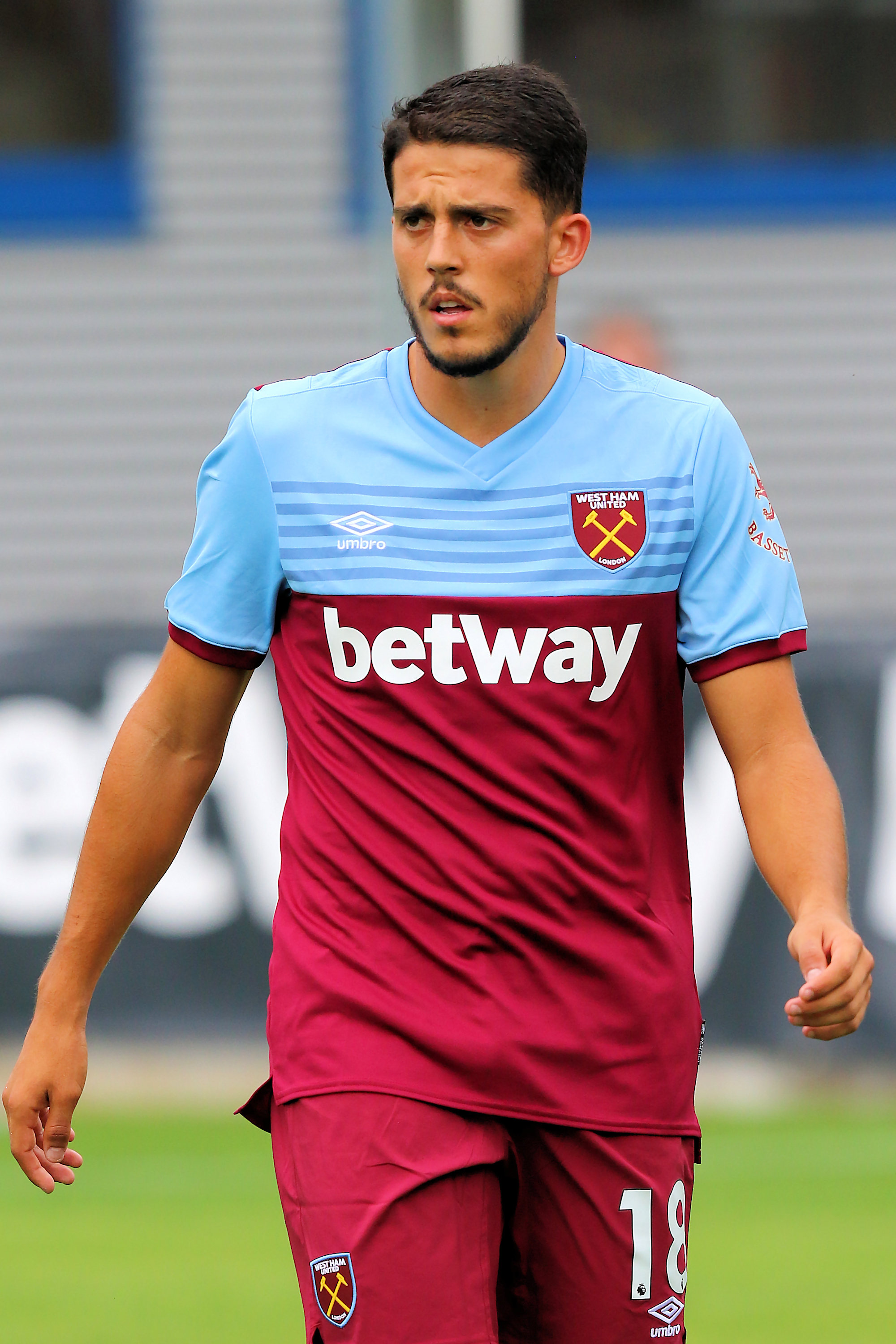
- Fornals with West Ham United in 2019

Personal information
- Full name: Pablo Fornals Malla
- Date of birth: 22 February 1996 (age 30)
- Place of birth: Castellón, Spain
- Height: 1.78 m (5 ft 10 in)
- Position: Attacking midfielder

Team information
- Current team: Betis
- Number: 8

Youth career
- 2003–2008: Villarreal
- 2008–2012: Castellón
- 2012–2014: Málaga

Senior career*
Years	Team	Apps	(Gls)
2014–2015	Málaga B	41	(12)
2015–2017	Málaga	59	(7)
2017–2019	Villarreal	70	(5)
2019–2024	West Ham United	152	(16)
2024–	Betis	88	(15)

International career^{‡}
2016–2019	Spain U21	17	(2)
2016–	Spain	9	(1)
Medal record
Men's football
Representing Spain
UEFA Nations League
Silver medal – second place	Italy 2021
- * Club domestic league appearances and goals as of 20:30, 31 October 2026 (UTC) ‡ National team caps and goals as of 00:19, 1 April 2026 (UTC)

Pablo Fornals Malla (Spanish pronunciation: [ˈpaβlo foɾˈnals]; born 22 February 1996) is a Spanish professional footballer who plays mainly as an attacking midfielder for La Liga club Real Betis and the Spain national team.

He amassed La Liga totals of 207 matches and 26 goals over seven seasons, with Málaga, Villarreal and Betis. In 2019, he signed with West Ham United, where he made over 200 appearances and won the UEFA Conference League in 2023.

Fornals made his senior debut for Spain in 2016.

== Club career ==
=== Málaga ===
Born in Castellón de la Plana, Valencian Community, Fornals joined Málaga's youth setup in 2012 at the age of 16, from Castellón. He made his senior debut with the reserves in the 2014–15 season, in the Tercera División.

Fornals' first competitive match with the first team – and in La Liga – occurred on 26 September 2015, when he started in a 0–0 away draw against Real Madrid. Two months and two days later, he scored his first top-flight goal in a 2–2 draw with Andalusian neighbours Granada at La Rosaleda Stadium, finding the net four minutes after replacing Duda.

On 4 December 2016, Fornals scored a brace in a 2–2 draw at Valencia.

=== Villarreal ===
On 24 July 2017, having paid his own €12 million buyout clause to leave Málaga, Fornals moved to fellow top-division side Villarreal, a club he already represented as a youth, agreeing to a five-year contract. The following 13 January, he scored a late chip after a counterattack to give his new team their first-ever win against Real Madrid at the Santiago Bernabéu Stadium (1–0).

On 26 September 2018, Fornals opened the scoring in a league fixture away to Athletic Bilbao with a dipping volley from 50 yards, in an eventual 3–0 victory.

=== West Ham United ===
On 14 June 2019, Fornals signed for West Ham United on a five-year contract for a transfer fee reported to be £24 million, making him the English club's second most expensive signing. He made his Premier League debut on 10 August, in a 5–0 home defeat by Manchester City coming on as a half-time substitute for Michail Antonio. He scored his first goal for his new team on 27 August, in a 2–0 victory over Newport County in the second round of the EFL Cup.

In 2020–21, Fornals made 33 league appearances and scored five times as West Ham qualified for the UEFA Europa League for the first time in five years. The following season, he featured in all twelve of his side's Europa League games as they reached the semi-finals, providing two assists in the 3–0 win at Olympique Lyonnais in the last-eight.

Fornals struggled for consistent game time in the 2022–23 campaign. However, on 23 April 2023, his scorpion kick closed a 4–0 away victory against AFC Bournemouth, with the goal being described as "stunning" and "one of the goals of the season". Additionally, he contributed 14 matches to the Hammers' victorious run in the UEFA Europa Conference League, their first trophy in 43 years, including 20 minutes of the 2–1 win over Fiorentina in the final in Prague; his three goals along the way were a brace in a 3–0 group win at FCSB, and the added-time only goal of the semi-final second leg away to AZ Alkmaar.

During his spell at the London Stadium, Fornals made 203 appearances and scored 23 times.

=== Betis ===
In the late hours of 1 February 2024, deadline to the winter transfer window, Fornals agreed to join Real Betis for a rumoured €6 million fee, pending on approval. The deal was officially confirmed the following day, with the player signing a contract until 2029. He made his debut on 4 February, in a 1–1 home draw with Getafe where he came on as a 66th-minute substitute for Assane Diao. He scored his first goal on 9 February, in the 2–0 away defeat of Cádiz; weaving in from the left hand side, he curled a left foot shot into the far side of the net in a goal described as "spectacular".

On 12 May 2026, Fornals scored the winning goal in a 2–1 victory over Elche, securing Betis' qualification for the UEFA Champions League for the first time since 2005.

== International career ==
On 28 March 2016, Fornals won his first cap with the Spain under-21s by playing the full 90 minutes in a 1–0 win against Norway at the Estadio Nueva Condomina. On 17 May, he was called up to the full squad by Vicente del Bosque for a friendly with Bosnia and Herzegovina. He made his debut 12 days later, replacing Mikel San José in the 3–1 victory at the AFG Arena in St. Gallen, Switzerland.

Fornals was a member of the team which won the 2019 UEFA European Under-21 Championship in June. In the tournament held in Italy and San Marino, he scored in group stage defeats of Belgium (2–1) and Poland (5–0).

In June 2021, Fornals was called up as a standby for Spain's UEFA Euro 2020 squad following Sergio Busquets' positive test for COVID-19. Making his first start on 8 September, against Kosovo in a 2022 FIFA World Cup qualifier, he scored his first goal for the national side when he opened a 2–0 win in Pristina.

== Personal life ==
Fornals' wife, Lara, gave birth to their son Martín in November 2021.

== Career statistics ==
=== Club ===
As of match played 31 October 2026

Appearances and goals by club, season and competition
Club	Season	League			National cup (Note: Includes Copa del Rey, FA Cup)		League cup (Note: Includes EFL Cup)		Europe		Other		Total	
Club	Season	Division	Apps	Goals	Apps	Goals	Apps	Goals	Apps	Goals	Apps	Goals	Apps	Goals
Málaga	2015–16	La Liga	27	1	2	0	–		–		–		29	1
Málaga	2016–17	La Liga	32	6	2	0	–		–		–		34	6
Málaga	Total		59	7	4	0	–		–		–		63	7
Villarreal	2017–18	La Liga	35	3	4	0	–		7 (Note: Appearances in UEFA Europa League)	1	–		46	4
Villarreal	2018–19	La Liga	35	2	3	0	–		12	3	–		50	5
Villarreal	Total		70	5	7	0	–		19	4	–		96	9
West Ham United	2019–20	Premier League	36	2	2	1	2	1	–		–		40	4
West Ham United	2020–21	Premier League	33	5	3	1	0	0	–		–		36	6
West Ham United	2021–22	Premier League	36	6	3	0	3	0	12	0	–		54	6
West Ham United	2022–23	Premier League	32	3	3	0	1	1	14 (Note: Appearances in UEFA (Europa) Conference League)	3	–		50	7
West Ham United	2023–24	Premier League	15	0	1	0	2	0	5	0	–		23	0
West Ham United	Total		152	16	12	2	8	2	31	3	–		203	23
Betis	2023–24	La Liga	15	3	–		–		0	0	–		15	3
Betis	2024–25	La Liga	26	2	1	0	–		11	0	–		38	2
Betis	2025–26	La Liga	37	9	3	0	–		11	0	–		51	9
Betis	2026–27	La Liga	10	1	0	0	–		3 (Note: Appearances in UEFA Champions League)	0	–		13	1
Betis	Total		88	15	4	0	–		25	0	0	0	117	15
Career total			369	43	27	2	8	2	75	7	0	0	479	54

=== International ===
As of match played 31 March 2026

National team	Year	Apps	Goals
Spain	2016	1	0
Spain	2017	0	0
Spain	2018	1	0
Spain	2019	0	0
Spain	2020	0	0
Spain	2021	4	1
Spain	2022	0	0
Spain	2023	0	0
Spain	2024	0	0
Spain	2025	1	0
Spain	2026	2	0
Total		9	1

Scores and results list Spain's goal tally first.

List of international goals scored by Pablo Fornals
No.	Date	Venue	Cap	Opponent	Score	Result	Competition
1	8 September 2021	Fadil Vokrri Stadium, Pristina, Kosovo	4	Kosovo	1–0	2–0	2022 FIFA World Cup qualification

== Honours ==
West Ham United

- UEFA Europa Conference League: 2022–23

Betis

- UEFA Conference League runner-up: 2024–25

Spain U21

- UEFA European Under-21 Championship: 2019

Spain

- UEFA Nations League runner-up: 2020–21

Individual

- La Liga Team of the Season: 2025–26
