= Santiago Cáseres =

Argentine footballer

Personal information
- Full name: Santiago Cáseres
- Date of birth: 25 February 1997 (age 29)
- Place of birth: Parque Leloir, Buenos Aires, Argentina
- Height: 1.80 m (5 ft 11 in)
- Position: Midfielder

Youth career
- 2005–2016: Vélez Sarsfield

Senior career*
Years	Team	Apps	(Gls)
2017–2018	Vélez Sarsfield	34	(0)
2018–2022	Villarreal	23	(0)
2020	→ América (loan)	21	(0)
2021–2022	→ Vélez Sarsfield (loan)	16	(1)
2022–2024	Vélez Sarsfield	42	(0)
- * Club domestic league appearances and goals as of 17:07, 1 June 2025 (UTC)

Santiago Cáseres (born 25 February 1997) is an Argentine professional footballer who plays as a defensive midfielder.

== Career ==
=== Vélez Sarsfield ===
Cáseres made his professional debut for Vélez Sarsfield entering the field in a 0–3 defeat to Newell's Old Boys, for the 2016–17 Argentine Primera División. The team's coach at the time was Omar De Felippe.

The midfielder became a regular starter for Vélez during the 2017–18 Argentine Primera División. Due to his strong performances, at the end of the first semester of the season Cáseres was linked with a possible move to Atlético Madrid, reportedly willing to pay his buyout clause of US$12 million.

=== Villarreal ===
Cáseres signed a five-year contract with Villarreal CF on 16 July 2018.

=== Club América ===
On 29 January 2020, Cáseres joined Liga MX side Club América on a one-year loan agreement up to 31 December 2020, with the option for a permanent deal.

=== Vélez Sarfield ===
On 22 February 2021, Cáseres returned to Argentina to Primera División side Vélez Sarfield, on a loan deal until December 2021. After that, in 2022 Cáseres signed a contract with Vélez Sarfield until December 2024 for $2.36 million.

== Career statistics ==
=== Club ===
As of 29 November 2020

Appearances and goals by club, season and competition
Club	Season	League			National Cup		League Cup		Continental		Other		Total	
Club	Season	Division	Apps	Goals	Apps	Goals	Apps	Goals	Apps	Goals	Apps	Goals	Apps	Goals
Vélez Sarsfield	2016–17	Primera División	11	0	0	0	—		—		—		11	0
Vélez Sarsfield	2017–18	Primera División	23	0	2	0	—		—		—		25	0
Vélez Sarsfield	Total		34	0	2	0	0	0	0	0	0	0	36	0
Villarreal	2018–19	La Liga	23	0	2	0	—		9 (Note: Appearances in the UEFA Europa League.)	0	—		34	0
Villarreal	2019–20	La Liga	0	0	0	0	—		—		—		0	0
Villarreal	Total		23	0	2	0	0	0	9	0	0	0	34	0
América (loan)	2020–21	Liga MX	14	0	0	0	—		0	0	2	0	16	0
Career total			71	0	4	0	0	0	9	0	2	0	86	0

== Honours ==
Vélez Sarsfield

- Argentine Primera División: 2024
