= San Sebastián de los Ballesteros =

- Municipality
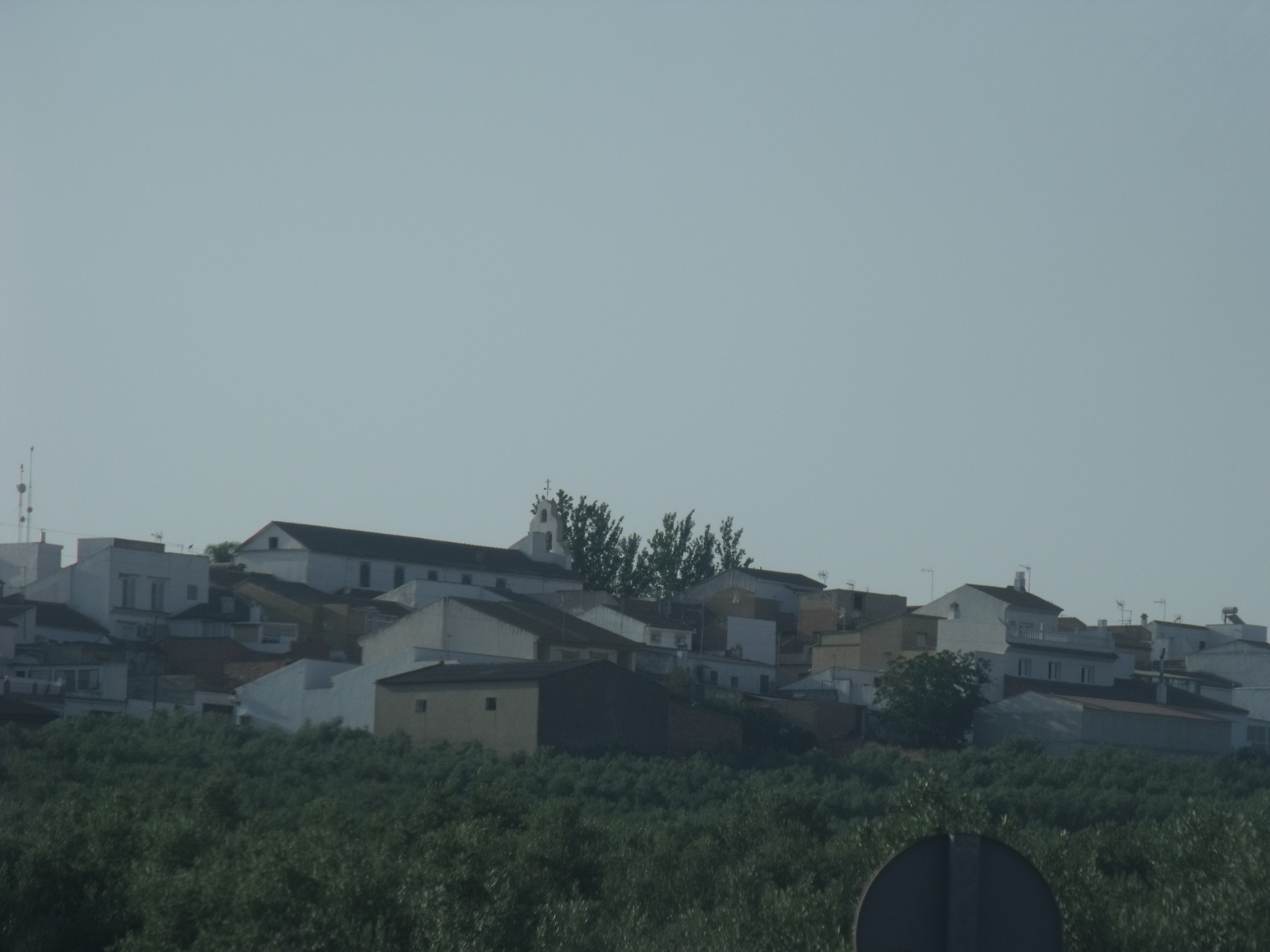
- Partial view of San Sebastián de los Ballesteros

- Flag Seal
- Interactive map of San Sebastián de los Ballesteros
- Coordinates: 37°39′N 4°49′W
- Country: Spain
- Province: Córdoba
- Municipality: San Sebastián de los Ballesteros

Area
  - Total: 10 km^{2} (3.9 sq mi)
- Elevation: 312 m (1,024 ft)

Population (2025-01-01)
  - Total: 865
  - Density: 86/km^{2} (220/sq mi)
- Time zone: UTC+1 (CET)
  - Summer (DST): UTC+2 (CEST)

San Sebastián de los Ballesteros is a municipality located in the province of Córdoba, Spain. According to the 2006 census (INE), the city has a population of 836 inhabitants.

== See also ==
- List of municipalities in Córdoba
