= Catarina, Nicaragua =

Catarina
- Municipality
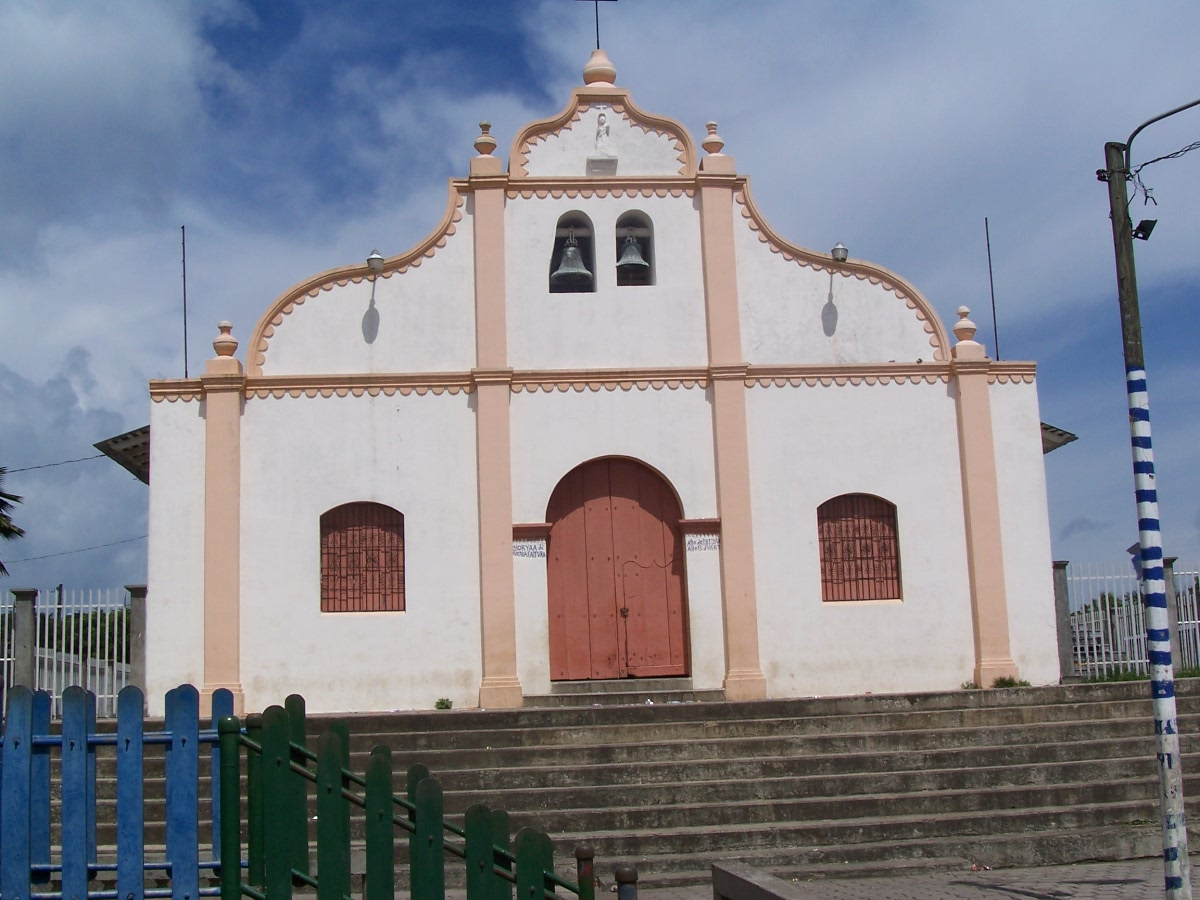
- Santa Catalina church

- Location in Nicaragua
- Coordinates: 11°54′43″N 86°4′31″W
- Country: Nicaragua
- Department: Masaya

Government
  - Mayor: Eddie Gallegos

Area
  - Land: 4.2 sq mi (11 km^{2})

Population
  - Municipality: 8,350
  - Urban: 4,069
- Climate: Aw

Catarina is a municipality in the Masaya department of Nicaragua with 4,500 inhabitants.
