= Álex López (footballer, born 1997) =

Spanish footballer

Personal information
- Full name: Alejandro López Moreno
- Date of birth: 2 June 1997 (age 29)
- Place of birth: Terrassa, Spain
- Height: 1.76 m (5 ft 9 in)
- Position: Midfielder

Team information
- Current team: Arenteiro
- Number: 21

Youth career
- Jàbac Terrassa
- 2009–2016: Espanyol

Senior career*
Years	Team	Apps	(Gls)
2014–2018	Espanyol B	73	(11)
2018–2021	Espanyol	4	(0)
2019–2020	→ Lugo (loan)	24	(2)
2021–2022	Mirandés	51	(1)
2023–2024	Alcorcón	28	(1)
2024	Kalamata	11	(0)
2024–2025	Gimnàstic	15	(0)
2025–2026	Marbella	34	(0)
2026–	Arenteiro	14	(0)
- * Club domestic league appearances and goals as of 10 June 2026

Alejandro "Álex" López Moreno (born 2 June 1997) is a Spanish professional footballer who plays as a central midfielder for Primera Federación club Arenteiro.

== Club career ==
Born in Terrassa, Barcelona, Catalonia, López joined RCD Espanyol's youth setup in 2009, from UFB Jàbac Terrassa. He made his senior debut with the reserves on 2 November 2014, coming on as a second-half substitute for Julián Luque in a 1–2 Segunda División B away loss against Elche CF Ilicitano.

López was definitely promoted to the B-team in July 2016, and scored his first senior goal on 17 December of that year by netting the opener through a penalty kick in a 3–0 home defeat of CE Sabadell FC. On 11 July 2017, after suffering relegation, he renewed his contract until 2022.

On 28 May 2018, López was definitely promoted to the main squad in La Liga ahead of the 2018–19 campaign. He made his professional debut on 1 November, starting in a 1–2 away loss against Cádiz CF, for the season's Copa del Rey.

López made his La Liga debut on 14 January 2019, replacing fellow youth graduate Óscar Melendo late into a 2–3 loss at Real Sociedad. On 17 August, after featuring rarely, he was loaned to Segunda División side CD Lugo for the season.

López scored his first professional goal on 9 November 2019, netting the game's only in an away success over Albacete Balompié. Upon returning, he was assigned back to the main squad, but terminated his contract on 22 January 2021 after featuring in only 16 minutes during the campaign; the following day, he signed a 18-month contract with fellow second division side CD Mirandés.

On 16 January 2023, after six months without a club, López moved to AD Alcorcón in Primera Federación, and helped in their promotion to the second level at first attempt with one goal in 21 appearances overall. On 31 January 2024, he terminated his contract with the club, and subsequently moved to Super League Greece 2 side Kalamata FC.

On 14 August 2024, López signed a one-year deal with Gimnàstic de Tarragona in the third division. He left the club the following 29 January, and joined fellow league team Marbella FC on a six-month contract just hours later.

On 2 February 2026, López moved to Arenteiro, also in the third tier.
