= 2012–13 Villarreal CF season =

Villarreal
2012–13 season
- President: Fernando Roig
- Head coach: Julio Velázquez (until 13 January); Marcelino (from 14 January)
- Stadium: El Madrigal
- Segunda División: 2nd (promoted)
- Copa del Rey: Second round
- Top goalscorer: League: Ikechukwu Uche (14); All: Ikechukwu Uche (14)
Home colours	Away colours

The 2012–13 season was Villarreal Club de Fútbol's 90th season in existence and the club's first season back in the second division of Spanish football following relegation at the end of the 2011–12 La Liga season. In addition to the domestic league, Villarreal participated in this season's edition of the Copa del Rey. The season covered the period from 1 July 2012 to 30 June 2013.

== Pre-season and friendlies ==
Win Draw Loss Postponed

21 July 2012 Friendly	Burriana (Spain)	0–4	(Spain) Villarreal	Burriana, Spain
20:00 CEST (UTC+2)		http://villarrealcf.es/es/noticias/noticias-generales/item/942-triunfo-c%C3%B3modo-ante-el-burriana-0-4	Trigueros 13'; Bruno 37'; Uche 39'; Gerard 69'	Stadium: Estadio Municipal San Fernando

25 July 2012 Friendly	Huesca (Spain)	3–3	(Spain) Villarreal	Huesca, Spain
20:00 CEST (UTC+2)	M. Martínez 67'; Jokin 80', 87'	http://villarrealcf.es/es/noticias/noticias-generales/item/952-huesca	Gerard 12'; Valero 48' (pen.); Trigueros 89'	Stadium: Estadio El Alcoraz

28 July 2012 Friendly	Ontinyent (Spain)	1–2	(Spain) Villarreal	El Saler, Spain
18:45 CEST (UTC+2)	Moreno 10'	http://villarrealcf.es/es/noticias/noticias-generales/item/959-trabajado-triunfo-ante-el-ontinyent-2-1	Gerard 58', 73'	Stadium: El Saler

1 August 2012 Friendly	Huracán (Spain)	1–0	(Spain) Villarreal	El Saler, Spain
19:00 CEST (UTC+2)		http://villarrealcf.es/es/noticias/noticias-generales/item/968-tropiezo-de-verano		Stadium: El Saler

4 August 2012 Friendly	Toulouse (France)	1–1	(Spain) Villarreal	Balma, France
19:00 CEST (UTC+2)	Abdennour 89'	http://villarrealcf.es/es/noticias/noticias-generales/item/985-tablas-ante-el-toulouse-en-francia-1-1	Uche 52'	Stadium: Stade Municipal de Balma

10 August 2012 Friendly	Gimnàstic de Tarragona (Spain)	1–0	(Spain) Villarreal	Tarragona, Spain
20:30 CEST (UTC+2)	Eugeni 83' (pen.)			Stadium: Nou Estadi

11 August 2012 Trofeo de la Cerámica	Villarreal (Spain)	2–1	(Spain) Levante	Vilarreal, Spain
19:45 CEST (UTC+2)	Navarro 39' (o.g.); Trigueros 63'		Ángel 11'	Stadium: El Madrigal

== Competitions ==
=== Overall record ===
Competition	First match	Last match	Starting round	Final position	Record							
Competition	First match	Last match	Starting round	Final position	Pld	W	D	L	GF	GA	GD	Win %
Segunda División	17 August 2012	8 June 2013	Matchday 1	2nd	42	21	14	7	68	38	+30	50.00
Copa del Rey	12 September 2012		Second round	Second round	1	0	0	1	0	2	−2	0.00
Total					43	21	14	8	68	40	+28	48.84

Source: Competitions

=== Segunda División ===
==== League table ====
Pos	Team	Pld	W	D	L	GF	GA	GD	Pts	Promotion, qualification or relegation
1	Elche (C, P)	42	23	13	6	54	27	+27	82	Promotion to La Liga
2	Villarreal (P)	42	21	14	7	68	38	+30	77	Promotion to La Liga
3	Almería (P)	42	22	8	12	72	50	+22	74	Qualification to promotion play-offs
4	Girona	42	21	8	13	74	56	+18	71	Qualification to promotion play-offs
5	Alcorcón	42	21	6	15	57	55	+2	69	Qualification to promotion play-offs

Source: LFP - Liga Adelante
Rules for classification: 1st points; 2nd head-to-head points; 3rd head-to-head goal difference; 4th head-to-head goals scored; 5th goal difference; 6th number of goals scored; 7th Fair-play points
(C) Champions; (P) Promoted

==== Results summary ====
Overall								Home						Away					
Pld	W	D	L	GF	GA	GD	Pts	W	D	L	GF	GA	GD	W	D	L	GF	GA	GD
42	21	14	7	68	38	+30	77	14	5	2	44	18	+26	7	9	5	24	20	+4

==== Results by round ====
Round	1	2	3	4	5	6	7	8	9	10	11	12	13	14	15	16	17	18	19	20	21	22	23	24	25	26	27	28	29	30	31	32	33	34	35	36	37	38	39	40	41	42
Ground	H	A	H	A	H	A	H	A	H	A	H	A	H	A	H	A	H	A	A	H	A	A	H	A	H	A	H	A	H	A	H	A	H	A	H	A	H	A	H	H	A	H
Result	W	D	W	W	W	D	W	L	D	L	W	D	D	W	D	L	W	L	D	L	D	L	W	D	W	D	D	W	W	W	D	W	W	D	W	D	L	W	W	W	W	W
Position	5	10	5	2	2	2	2	3	3	6	5	5	5	4	5	5	5	5	5	6	7	10	8	8	7	6	7	5	5	5	5	4	3	4	4	4	4	3	2	2	2	2

A = Away; H = Home; W = Win; D = Draw; L = Loss

==== Matches ====
17 August 2012 1	Villarreal	2–1	Real Madrid Castilla	Vilarreal
21:00 CEST (UTC+2)	Cavenaghi 45', 79'	Report	Jesé 18' (pen.)	Stadium: El Madrigal

25 August 2012 2	Sabadell	0–0	Villarreal	Sabadell
--:-- CEST (UTC+2)				Stadium: Nova Creu Alta

1 September 2012 3	Villarreal	2–1	Guadalajara	Vilarreal
--:-- CEST (UTC+2)	Musacchio 68'; Pandiani 81'		Kepa 13'	Stadium: El Madrigal

8 September 2012 4	Ponferradina	0–1	Villarreal	Ponferrada
--:-- CEST (UTC+2)			Pandiani 72'	Stadium: El Toralín

15 September 2012 5	Villarreal	1–0	Hércules	Vilarreal
--:-- CEST (UTC+2)	Cavenaghi 37'			Stadium: El Madrigal

22 September 2012 6	Las Palmas	2–2	Villarreal	Las Palmas
--:-- CEST (UTC+2)	Bifouma 46', 71'		Senna 6' (pen.), 83' (pen.)	Stadium: Gran Canaria

29 September 2012 7	Villarreal	2–0	Córdoba	Vilarreal
--:-- CEST (UTC+2)	Pérez 79'; Uche 90+1'			Stadium: El Madrigal

7 October 2012 8	Sporting Gijón	2–0	Villarreal	Gijón
12:00 CEST (UTC+2)	Mandi (yellow card) 22'; Rodríguez 40'; Carmona (yellow card) 55'; Sangoy 89'		Bruno (red card) 35'; Toribio (yellow card) 73'	Stadium: El Molinón; Attendance: 20,000

13 October 2012 9	Villarreal	1–1	Huesca	Vilarreal
21:00 CEST (UTC+2)	Senna 12'; Mellberg (yellow card) 48'; Pandiani (yellow card) 71'; Costa (yellow card) 89'		López 31'; Lázaro (yellow card) 74'	Stadium: El Madrigal; Attendance: 7,000

21 October 2012 10	Recreativo	2–0	Villarreal	Huelva
18:00 CEST (UTC+2)	Chuli (yellow card) 15'; Montoro (yellow card) 22'; Zamora (yellow card) 46'; Szymanowski 63'; Valle 90+3'		Senna (yellow card) 75'; Pérez (yellow card) 77' (yellow-red card) 83'; Lejeune (yellow card) 78'; Mario (yellow card) 89'	Stadium: Nuevo Colombino

27 October 2012 11	Villarreal	2–0	Mirandés	Vilarreal
18:00 CEST (UTC+2)	Uche 12', 49'			Stadium: El Madrigal

3 November 2012 12	Numancia	1–1	Villarreal	Soria
16:00 CET (UTC+1)	Nieto (yellow card) 18'; Sunday (yellow card) 41'; Juanma (yellow card) 63', (goal) 88'; Bedoya (yellow card) 89'		Trigueros 77'; Pérez (yellow card) 84'	Stadium: Los Pajaritos

11 November 2012 13	Villarreal	1–1	Real Murcia	Vilarreal
12:00 CET (UTC+1)	Trigueros (yellow card) 40'; Oriol (yellow card) 44'; Senna 52' (pen.); Toribio (yellow card) 88'		Catalá (yellow card) 31'; C. García (yellow card) 36'; Molinero (yellow card) 51'; Berjón 86'; Matilla (yellow card) 89'	Stadium: El Madrigal

17 November 2012 14	Racing Santander	0–3	Villarreal	Santander
16:00 CET (UTC+1)	Francis (yellow card) 42'; Bouazza (yellow card) 81'; Assulin (yellow card) 85'		Trigueros 33'; Uche 39', 53'; Oriol (yellow card) 71'	Stadium: El Sardinero

24 November 2012 15	Villarreal	1–1	Lugo	Vilarreal
20:00 CET (UTC+1)	Cani 35'; Musacchio (yellow card) 86'		De Coz (yellow card) 22'; Díaz 55'; Tonetto (yellow card) 83'; Marco (yellow card) 87'	Stadium: El Madrigal

2 December 2012 16	Elche	1–0	Villarreal	Elche
20:30 CET (UTC+1)	Suárez (yellow card) 66'; Coro 71'; Linares (yellow card) 89'		Senna (yellow card) 52'; Musacchio (yellow card) 63'	Stadium: Martínez Valero

9 December 2012 17	Villarreal	4–0	Alcorcón	Vilarreal
17:00 CET (UTC+1)	Senna (yellow card) 14'; Melberg (yellow card) 43'; Bruno 50'; Uche 75'; Pérez 86'; Cavenaghi 90'		Mora (yellow card) 6' (yellow-red card) 62'; Manu (yellow card) 27'; Laguardia (yellow card) 64'; Abraham (yellow card) 64'; Ángel (yellow card) 82'	Stadium: El Madrigal

15 December 2012 18	Girona	2–0	Villarreal	Girona
20:00 CET (UTC+1)	Juanlu (yellow card) 20'; Benja 51'; Tébar (yellow card) 52'; Jandro 82' (pen.)		Bruno (yellow card) 35'; Pandiani (yellow card) 56'; Cani (yellow card) 62'; Mellberg (yellow card) 74' (yellow-red card) 80'; Mariño (yellow card) 81'	Stadium: Montilivi

20 December 2012 19	Xerez	0–0	Villarreal	Jerez
20:00 CET (UTC+1)	Ruz (yellow card) 18'; Cámara (yellow card) 66'; Tato (yellow card) 88'		Cavenaghi (yellow card) 6'; Trigueros (yellow card) 16'; Bruno (yellow card) 69'; Pérez (yellow card) 90'	Stadium: Chapín

5 January 2013 20	Villarreal	1–3	Barcelona B	Vilarreal
18:00 CET (UTC+1)	Melberg (yellow card) 45'; Senna (yellow card) 55', (goal) 77' (pen.); Pereira (yellow card) 85'		Planas 45'; Grimaldo (yellow card) 68'; Lobato 73'; Costa 85' (o.g.)	Stadium: El Madrigal

12 January 2013 21	Almería	1–1	Villarreal	Almería
20:00 CET (UTC+1)	Pallerano (yellow card) 28'; Henrique (yellow card) 33' (yellow-red card) 60'; Corona 49'; Verza (yellow card) 90'		Costa (yellow card) 30'; Juan Carlos (yellow card) 49'; Cani (yellow card) 55'; Mellberg 63'; Musacchio (yellow card) 73'; Bruno (yellow card) 90'	Stadium: Juegos Mediterráneos

19 January 2013 22	Real Madrid Castilla	5–0	Villarreal	Madrid
20:00 CET (UTC+1)	Morata 18'; Álex (yellow card) 36'; García 45'; Mateos (yellow card) 65'; Jesé (yellow card) 71', (goal) 75'; Mosquera 73'; Cheryshev 78'; González (yellow card) 86'	Summary	Bruno (yellow card) 30'	Stadium: Alfredo di Stéfano Stadium

25 January 2013 23	Villarreal	3–0	Sabadell	Vilarreal
21:00 CET (UTC+1)	Gerard 12'; Oriol (yellow card) 33'; Musacchio (yellow card) 42'; Cani 66'; Pereira 87'		Ciércoles (yellow card) 75'	Stadium: El Madrigal

2 February 2013 24	Guadalajara	0–0	Villarreal	Guadalajara
18:00 CET (UTC+1)	Soriano (yellow card) 61'; Pérez (yellow card) 67'	Summary	Pereira (yellow card) 70'; Musacchio (yellow card) 71'	Stadium: Pedro Escartín

9 February 2013 25	Villarreal	3–0	Ponferradina	Vilarreal
18:00 CET (UTC+1)	Pereira 34'; Senna (yellow card) 35'; Perbet 39', 57'; Dorado (yellow card) 49'	Summary	Moreno (yellow card) 48'; Isaías (yellow card) 52'	Stadium: El Madrigal

17 February 2013 26	Hércules	1–1	Villarreal	Alicante
19:00 CET (UTC+1)	Peña (yellow card) 36'; Pamarot 65'; Redondo (yellow card) 73'; Sardinero (yellow card) 79'; Cabrera (yellow card) 88'	Summary	Musacchio (yellow card) 22'; Farinós 40', (yellow card) 54'; Bruno (yellow card) 60'	Stadium: Rico Pérez

24 February 2013 27	Villarreal	1–1	Las Palmas	Vilarreal
20:00 CET (UTC+1)	Perbet 45+2'; Gómez (yellow card) 68'	Summary	Murillo (yellow card) 12', (goal) 73'; Bifouma (yellow card) 28'; Castellano (yellow card) 47'; Vitolo (yellow card) 52'; Pignol (yellow card) 87'	Stadium: El Madrigal

3 March 2013 28	Córdoba	0–2	Villarreal	Córdoba
21:00 CET (UTC+1)	Armando (yellow card) 36'; Dubarbier (yellow card) 52'; Vico (yellow card) 89'		Musacchio 27'; Gómez (yellow card) 30'; Pereira 44'; Perbet (yellow card) 69'; Costa (yellow card) 72'; Farinós (yellow card) 88'	Stadium: Nuevo Arcángel; Attendance: 8,108

10 March 2013 29	Villarreal	2–1	Sporting Gijón	Vilarreal
12:00 CET (UTC+1)	Costa (yellow card) 12'; Uche 39', 90+3'; Farinós (yellow card) 89'; Pereira (yellow card) 89'		Cases (yellow card) 11'; Bernardo (yellow card) 24'; Trejo (yellow card) 32'; Sangoy 66'	Stadium: El Madrigal; Attendance: 10,000

16 March 2013 30	Huesca	0–1	Villarreal	Huesca
20:00 CET (UTC+1)	López (yellow card) 16'; Pacheco (yellow card) 22'; García (red card) 27'; Juan Carlos (yellow card) 38'; Núñez (yellow card) 86'		Costa (yellow card) 13'; Mario (yellow card) 41'; Bruno (yellow card) 50' (yellow-red card) 81'; Pereira 80', (yellow card) 80'; Trigueros (yellow card) 85'	Stadium: El Alcoraz; Attendance: 3,800

24 March 2013 31	Villarreal	1–1	Recreativo	Vilarreal
19:00 CET (UTC+1)	Costa (yellow card) 78'; Gerard 88'		Montoro (yellow card) 21'; Valle (yellow card) 25'; Berrocal 47'; Arana (yellow card) 61'	Stadium: El Madrigal; Attendance: 11,000

31 March 2013 32	Mirandés	1–5	Villarreal	Miranda de Ebro
17:00 CEST (UTC+2)	Muneta 32'; Koikili (yellow card) 63'; Díaz de Cerio (yellow card) 79'		Gerard 34'; Cani 37'; Perbet 52', 89'; Mario (yellow card) 78'; Pereira 83'	Stadium: Anduva; Attendance: 4,764

7 April 2013 33	Villarreal	6–1	Numancia	Vilarreal
17:00 CEST (UTC+2)	Perbet 10', 80' (pen.), (yellow card) 54'; Canteros 13'; Bruno (yellow card) 16'; Gerard 47'; Dorado (yellow card) 50'; Uche 86'; Regalón 90' (o.g.)		Sunday (yellow card) 29'; Martín 39'; Juanma (yellow card) 44'; Álvarez (yellow card) 58'; Larrea (yellow card) 77'; Regalón (yellow card) 79'	Stadium: El Madrigal; Attendance: 11,000

14 April 2013 34	Real Murcia	1–1	Villarreal	Murcia
12:00 CEST (UTC+2)	Kike 45'; Matilla (red card) 57'; Acciari (yellow card) 67'; Albiol (yellow card) 81'; Nafti (yellow card) 85'; Sutil (yellow card) 88'		Costa (yellow card) 14'; Manu 90+5'	Stadium: Nueva Condomina; Attendance: 8,471

21 April 2013 35	Villarreal	1–0	Racing Santander	Vilarreal
19:00 CEST (UTC+2)	Gómez 46', (yellow card) 67'; Oriol (yellow card) 72'		Barrio (yellow card) 15'; Pérez (yellow card) 88'	Stadium: El Madrigal; Attendance: 18,000

27 April 2013 36	Lugo	0–0	Villarreal	Lugo
17:00 CEST (UTC+2)	Seoane (yellow card) 35'; Manu (yellow card) 73'; López (yellow card) 87'		Senna (yellow card) 54'; Musacchio (yellow card) 83'	Stadium: Anxo Carro; Attendance: 2,500

5 May 2013 37	Villarreal	2–3	Elche	Vilarreal
12:00 CEST (UTC+2)	Perbet 9' (pen.); Bruno (yellow card) 64' (yellow-red card) 88'; Uche 81'; Musacchio (yellow card) 89'		Gil 51', (yellow card) 62'; Generelo 55', (yellow card) 67'; Coro (yellow card) 70'; Ángel 86'; Suárez (yellow card) 89'	Stadium: El Madrigal; Attendance: 12,000

12 May 2013 38	Alcorcón	1–3	Villarreal	Alcorcón
12:00 CEST (UTC+2)	Nagore (yellow card) 31' (yellow-red card) 89'; Kike (yellow card) 49'; Sanz (yellow card) 58'; Camille (yellow card) 60'; Enrich 75'; Sánchez (yellow card) 77'; Lamas (yellow card) 81'; Riera (yellow card) 88'; Prendes (yellow card) 89'		Uche 8'; Cani (yellow card) 32'; Bruno 38'; Mellberg (yellow card) 51'; Aquino (yellow card) 65'; Juan Carlos (yellow card) 87'; Canteros 90+3'	Stadium: Santo Domingo; Attendance: 2,000

18 May 2013 39	Villarreal	4–1	Girona	Vilarreal
--:-- CEST (UTC+2)				Stadium: El Madrigal

27 May 2013 40	Villarreal	3–2	Xerez	Vilarreal
--:-- CEST (UTC+2)				Stadium: El Madrigal

2 June 2013 41	Barcelona B	0–3	Villarreal	Barcelona
17:00 CEST (UTC+2)	Araujo (yellow card) 56'		Musacchio (yellow card) 19'; Mario (yellow card) 36'; Pereira (yellow card) 45'; Bruno 62'; Parbet 56'; Gómez (yellow card) 67'; Costa (yellow card) 81'; Melberg (yellow card) 84'; Senna (yellow card) 86'	Stadium: Mini Estadi

8 June 2013 42	Villarreal	1–0	Almería	Vilarreal
18:00 CEST (UTC+2)	Canteros (yellow card) 34'; Pereira 56'; Perbet (yellow card) 65'; Cani (yellow card) 88'		Corona (yellow card) 77'; Suárez (yellow card) 87'; Pellerano (yellow card) 88'	Stadium: El Madrigal

=== Copa del Rey ===
==== Second round ====
12 September 2012	Villarreal	0–2	Ponferradina	Vilarreal
22:00 CEST (UTC+2)	Truyols (yellow card) 53'; Bruno (yellow card) 69' (yellow-red card) 77'		Baró (yellow card) 50'; Silva 56'; Isaías (yellow card) 65'; Leandro (yellow card) 79'; Ruiz (yellow card) 81'; Lafuente 90'	Stadium: El Madrigal

== Squad ==
=== Squad, matches played and goals scored ===
As of 31 January 2013

The numbers are established according to the official website: and www.lfp.es

Note: Flags indicate national team as defined under FIFA eligibility rules; some limited exceptions apply. Players may hold more than one non-FIFA nationality.

No.	Pos.	Nation	Player
1	GK	ESP	Diego Mariño
2	DF	ESP	Mario
3	DF	ESP	Joan Oriol
4	DF	ARG	Mateo Musacchio
5	DF	ESP	Joan Truyols
6	DF	SWE	Olof Mellberg
7	FW	FRA	Jérémy Perbet (on loan from Mons)
8	FW	NGR	Ikechukwu Uche
9	MF	MEX	Javier Aquino
10	MF	ESP	Cani
11	MF	PAR	Hernán Pérez
14	MF	ESP	Manu Trigueros

No.	Pos.	Nation	Player
15	MF	ESP	Javier Farinós
16	DF	ESP	José Dorado
17	DF	ESP	Javi Venta
18	DF	ESP	Jaume Costa
19	MF	ESP	Marcos Senna (captain)
20	MF	ARG	Héctor Canteros
21	MF	ESP	Bruno (2nd captain)
22	MF	ESP	Juanma
24	FW	ESP	Jonathan Pereira
25	GK	ESP	Juan Carlos
27	MF	ESP	Moi Gómez
29	MF	ESP	Pablo Íñiguez
32	FW	ESP	Gerard

=== Out on loan ===
Note: Flags indicate national team as defined under FIFA eligibility rules; some limited exceptions apply. Players may hold more than one non-FIFA nationality.

No.	Pos.	Nation	Player
—	DF	FRA	Florian Lejeune (at Stade Brest)
—	DF	COL	Cristián Zapata (at Milan)
—	DF	ESP	Toño (at Sabadell)
—	MF	ESP	Javier Camuñas (at Deportivo La Coruña)

No.	Pos.	Nation	Player
—	MF	ARG	Gonzalo Castellani (at Godoy Cruz)
—	MF	NED	Jonathan de Guzmán (at Swansea City)
—	FW	ESP	Gerard Bordas (at Girona)
—	FW	ESP	Joselu (at Córdoba)

== Transfers ==
=== In ===
Date	Pos.	Name	From	Fee
13 June 2012	DEF	(Spain) Javi Venta	(Spain) Levante	Free
13 May 2012	DEF	(Spain) Iván Marcano	(Greece) Olympiacos	Loan return
13 May 2012	MID	(Ecuador) Jefferson Montero	(Spain) Real Betis	Loan return
13 May 2012	FW	(Nigeria) Ikechukwu Uche	(Spain) Granada	Loan return
13 May 2012	GK	(Spain) Juan Carlos	(Spain) Elche	Loan return
8 August 2012	DEF	(Sweden) Olof Mellberg	(Greece) Olympiacos	Free

=== Out ===
Date	Pos.	Name	To	Fee
22 May 2012	GK	(Spain) Diego López	(Spain) Sevilla	€3.5M
2 June 2012	DEF	(Spain) Iván Marcano	(Russia) Rubin Kazan	€5M
17 June 2012	MID	(Ecuador) Jefferson Montero	(Mexico) Monarcas Morelia	Undisclosed
17 July 2012	FW	(Brazil) Nilmar	(Qatar) Al-Rayyan	Undisclosed
12 July 2012	MID	(Ghana) Mubarak Wakaso	(Spain) Espanyol	Undisclosed
13 July 2012	FW	(Argentina) Marco Ruben	(Ukraine) Dynamo Kyiv	Undisclosed
1 June 2012	GK	(Spain) César	Retirement	Free
3 June 2012	FW	(Argentina) Alejandro Martinuccio	(Brazil) Fluminense	Loan return
1 August 2012	MID	(Spain) Borja Valero	(Italy) Fiorentina	€7M
1 June 2012	DEF	(Spain) Carlos Marchena	(Spain) Deportivo La Coruña	Free
2 August 2012	DEF	(Argentina) Gonzalo Rodríguez	(Italy) Fiorentina	Undisclosed
1 July 2012	MID	(Argentina) Gonzalo Castellani	(Argentina) Godoy Cruz	Undisclosed
9 August 2012	DEF	(Spain) Ángel López	Free agent	Free
4 January 2013	FW	(Italy) Giuseppe Rossi	(Italy) Fiorentina	€9.5M

=== Loan out ===
Date from	Date to	Pos.	Name	To	
1 July 2012	15 May 2013	FW	(Spain) Joselu	(Spain) Córdoba	Loan
10 July 2012	15 May 2013	MID	(Netherlands) Jonathan de Guzmán	(Wales) Swansea City	Loan
8 August 2012	15 May 2013	DEF	(Colombia) Cristián Zapata	(Italy) Milan	Loan
