= 2013–14 Villarreal CF season =

Villarreal
2013–14 season
- President: Fernando Roig
- Head coach: Marcelino
- Stadium: El Madrigal
- La Liga: 6th
- Copa del Rey: Round of 16
- Top goalscorer: League: Ikechukwu Uche (14); All: Ikechukwu Uche (14)
| Home colours | Away colours |

The 2013–14 season was Villarreal Club de Fútbol's 91st season in existence and the club's first season back in the top flight of Spanish football since 2012. In addition to the domestic league, Villarreal participated in this season's edition of the Copa del Rey. The season covered the period from 1 July 2013 to 30 June 2014.

== Squad ==
As June, 2014..

=== Squad and statistics ===
| No. | Pos | Nat | Player | Total | | Liga | | Copa | |
| No. | Pos | Nat | Player | Apps | Goals | Apps | Goals | Apps | Goals |
|---|---|---|---|---|---|---|---|---|---|
| 1 | GK | (Spain) ESP | Sergio Asenjo | 35 | 0 | 35 | 0 | 0 | 0 |
| 2 | DF | (Spain) ESP | Mario | 37 | 1 | 36 | 1 | 1 | 0 |
| 3 | DF | (Slovenia) SLO | Bojan Jokić | 19 | 0 | 15 | 0 | 4 | 0 |
| 4 | MF | (Spain) ESP | Tomás Pina | 39 | 2 | 35 | 2 | 4 | 0 |
| 5 | DF | (Argentina) ARG | Mateo Musacchio | 35 | 1 | 32 | 1 | 3 | 0 |
| 6 | DF | (Serbia) SRB | Aleksandar Pantić | 13 | 0 | 9 | 0 | 4 | 0 |
| 7 | FW | (France) FRA | Jérémy Perbet | 30 | 11 | 26 | 10 | 4 | 1 |
| 8 | FW | (Nigeria) NGR | Ikechukwu Uche | 32 | 14 | 30 | 14 | 2 | 0 |
| 9 | FW | (Mexico) MEX | Giovani dos Santos | 34 | 12 | 31 | 11 | 3 | 1 |
| 10 | MF | (Spain) ESP | Cani | 27 | 3 | 26 | 3 | 1 | 0 |
| 11 | FW | (Paraguay) PAR | Hernán Pérez | 14 | 1 | 13 | 1 | 1 | 0 |
| 12 | MF | (Spain) ESP | Joan Àngel Román | 2 | 0 | 2 | 0 | 0 | 0 |
| 14 | MF | (Spain) ESP | Manu Trigueros | 38 | 2 | 35 | 2 | 3 | 0 |
| 16 | DF | (Spain) ESP | José Dorado | 21 | 0 | 19 | 0 | 2 | 0 |
| 17 | MF | (Mexico) MEX | Javier Aquino | 36 | 2 | 32 | 1 | 4 | 1 |
| 18 | DF | (Spain) ESP | Jaume Costa | 32 | 1 | 30 | 1 | 2 | 0 |
| 19 | MF | (Spain) ESP | Óliver | 9 | 0 | 9 | 0 | 0 | 0 |
| 20 | DF | (Brazil) BRA | Gabriel | 21 | 0 | 18 | 0 | 3 | 0 |
| 21 | MF | (Spain) ESP | Bruno | 39 | 6 | 36 | 6 | 3 | 0 |
| 24 | FW | (Spain) ESP | Jonathan Pereira | 33 | 4 | 30 | 4 | 3 | 0 |
| 25 | GK | (Spain) ESP | Juan Carlos | 7 | 0 | 3 | 0 | 4 | 0 |
| 27 | MF | (Spain) ESP | Moi Gómez | 23 | 2 | 19 | 2 | 4 | 0 |
| 28 | MF | (Spain) ESP | Edu Ramos | 3 | 0 | 3 | 0 | 0 | 0 |
| 29 | DF | (Spain) ESP | Pablo Íñiguez | 4 | 0 | 3 | 0 | 1 | 0 |
| 44 | MF | (Argentina) ARG | Matías Nahuel | 5 | 0 | 5 | 0 | 0 | 0 |

== Competitions ==
=== Overall record ===
| Competition | First match | Last match | Starting round | Final position | Record | | | | | | | |
| Competition | First match | Last match | Starting round | Final position | Pld | W | D | L | GF | GA | GD | Win % |
|---|---|---|---|---|---|---|---|---|---|---|---|---|
| La Liga | 19 August 2013 | 18 May 2014 | Matchday 1 | 6th | 38 | 17 | 8 | 13 | 60 | 44 | +16 | 44.74 |
| Copa del Rey | 6 December 2013 | 16 January 2014 | Round of 32 | Round of 16 | 4 | 1 | 2 | 1 | 3 | 3 | +0 | 25.00 |
| Total | | | | | 42 | 18 | 10 | 14 | 63 | 47 | +16 | 42.86 |

Source: Competitions

=== La Liga ===
==== League table ====
| Pos | Team | Pld | W | D | L | GF | GA | GD | Pts | Qualification or relegation |
|---|---|---|---|---|---|---|---|---|---|---|
| 4 | Athletic Bilbao | 38 | 20 | 10 | 8 | 66 | 39 | +27 | 70 | Qualification for the Champions League play-off round |
| 5 | Sevilla | 38 | 18 | 9 | 11 | 69 | 52 | +17 | 63 | Qualification for the Europa League group stage (Note: Sevilla automatically qualified for the 2014–15 UEFA Europa League group stage as the defending champions; the berth through their league position was vacated.) |
| 6 | Villarreal | 38 | 17 | 8 | 13 | 60 | 44 | +16 | 59 (Note: Villarreal finished ahead of Real Sociedad on head-to-head points: Villarreal 5–1 Real Sociedad, Real Sociedad 1–2 Villarreal.) | Qualification for the Europa League play-off round (Note: Since both the 2013–14 Copa del Rey champions (Real Madrid) and runners-up (Barcelona) qualified for the 2014–15 UEFA Champions League, the 5th, 6th and 7th placed teams qualified for the group stage, play-off round and third qualifying round of the 2014–15 UEFA Europa League respectively.) |
| 7 | Real Sociedad | 38 | 16 | 11 | 11 | 62 | 55 | +7 | 59 | Qualification for the Europa League third qualifying round |
| 8 | Valencia | 38 | 13 | 10 | 15 | 51 | 53 | −2 | 49 | |

Source: La Liga, ESPN
Rules for classification: 1st points; 2nd head-to-head points;

==== Results summary ====
| Overall | | | | | | | | Home | | | | | | Away | | | | | |
| Pld | W | D | L | GF | GA | GD | Pts | W | D | L | GF | GA | GD | W | D | L | GF | GA | GD |
|---|---|---|---|---|---|---|---|---|---|---|---|---|---|---|---|---|---|---|---|
| 38 | 17 | 8 | 13 | 60 | 44 | +16 | 59 | 9 | 6 | 4 | 36 | 21 | +15 | 8 | 2 | 9 | 24 | 23 | +1 |

Source: Competitive matches

==== Results by round ====
| Round | 1 | 2 | 3 | 4 | 5 | 6 | 7 | 8 | 9 | 10 | 11 | 12 | 13 | 14 | 15 | 16 | 17 | 18 | 19 | 20 | 21 | 22 | 23 | 24 | 25 | 26 | 27 | 28 | 29 | 30 | 31 | 32 | 33 | 34 | 35 | 36 | 37 | 38 |
|---|---|---|---|---|---|---|---|---|---|---|---|---|---|---|---|---|---|---|---|---|---|---|---|---|---|---|---|---|---|---|---|---|---|---|---|---|---|---|
| Ground | A | H | A | H | A | H | A | H | A | H | H | A | H | A | H | A | H | A | H | H | A | H | A | H | A | H | A | H | A | A | H | A | H | A | H | A | H | A |
| Result | W | W | W | D | D | W | L | W | L | W | L | W | D | W | D | L | L | W | W | W | L | W | L | L | W | D | L | D | L | W | D | L | W | L | L | D | W | W |
| Position | 5 | 4 | 3 | 3 | 4 | 4 | 4 | 4 | 4 | 4 | 4 | 4 | 4 | 4 | 5 | 5 | 6 | 6 | 5 | 5 | 5 | 5 | 5 | 5 | 5 | 5 | 5 | 6 | 7 | 7 | 7 | 7 | 6 | 7 | 7 | 7 | 7 | 6 |

Source: La Liga
A = Away; H = Home; W = Win; D = Draw; L = Loss

==== Matches ====
| 19 August 2013 1 | Almería | 2–3 | Villarreal | Almería |
| 22:00 CEST (UTC+2) | Rafita (yellow card) 35'; Rodri 39', 74'; Pellerano (yellow card) 89' | Report | Dubarbier 65' (o.g.); Dos Santos 83'; Pereira 86' | Stadium: Mediterráneo; Attendance: 7,000; Referee: Alberto Undiano Mallenco |

| 24 August 2013 2 | Villarreal | 2–1 | Valladolid | Villarreal |
| 23:00 CEST (UTC+2) | Dos Santos 38' (pen.); Costa (yellow card) 55'; Mario (yellow card) 59'; Perbet (yellow card) 61'; Dorado (yellow card) 69'; Cani 83' | Report | Guerra 4'; Valiente (yellow card) 45'; Bergdich (yellow card) 86' | Stadium: El Madrigal; Attendance: 13,000; Referee: Jesús Gil Manzano |

| 31 August 2013 3 | Osasuna | 0–3 | Villarreal | Pamplona |
| 23:00 CEST (UTC+2) | Lotiès (yellow card) 44'; Armenteros (yellow card) 69'; Torres (yellow card) 72' | Report | Perbet 22'; Aquino 30'; Cani (yellow card) 72'; Uche 75'; Pina (yellow card) 85' | Stadium: El Sadar; Attendance: 12,474; Referee: David Fernández Borbalán |

| 14 September 2013 4 | Villarreal | 2–2 | Real Madrid | Villarreal |
| 22:00 CEST (UTC+2) | Cani 21'; Aquino (yellow card) 34'; Dos Santos 70'; Pina (yellow card) 78' | Report | Nacho (yellow card) 37'; Bale 38'; Ramos (yellow card) 57'; Ronaldo 64'; Morata (yellow card) 77' | Stadium: El Madrigal; Attendance: 22,000; Referee: Fernando Teixeira Vitienes |

| 22 September 2013 5 | Celta Vigo | 0–0 | Villarreal | Vigo |
| 17:00 CEST (UTC+2) | López (yellow card) 38'; Aurtenetxe (yellow card) 54'; Costas (yellow card) 75'; Rafinha (yellow card) 84'; Mallo (yellow card) 90+1' | Report | Bruno (yellow card) 48' | Stadium: Balaídos; Attendance: 21,130; Referee: Pedro Pérez Montero |

| 26 September 2013 6 | Villarreal | 2–1 | Espanyol | Villarreal |
| 22:00 CEST (UTC+2) | Perbet 1'; Pereira 67'; Bruno (yellow card) 70' | Report | Sidnei (yellow card) 47'; Sánchez (yellow card) 50'; García 80'; Mattioni (yellow card) 90' | Stadium: El Madrigal; Attendance: 19,000; Referee: Eduardo Prieto Iglesias |

| 29 September 2013 7 | Real Betis | 1–0 | Villarreal | Seville |
| 21:00 CEST (UTC+2) | Matilla (yellow card) 15'; Vadillo (yellow card) 23'; Igiebor 36'; Amaya (yellow card) 53'; Chica (yellow card) 62'; Reyes (yellow card) 79'; Vilà (yellow card) 89' | Report | Mario (yellow card) 10'; Jokić (yellow card) 72'; Cani (yellow card) 79' | Stadium: Benito Villamarín; Attendance: 35,000; Referee: Carlos Delgado Ferreiro |

| 4 October 2013 8 | Villarreal | 3–0 | Granada | Villarreal |
| 20:00 CEST (UTC+2) | Bruno 30'; Dos Santos 49'; Pina 82' | Summary | Bounanotte (yellow card) 81' | Stadium: El Madrigal; Attendance: 15,000; Referee: Alejandro Hernández Hernández |

| 21 October 2013 9 | Athletic Bilbao | 2–0 | Villarreal | Bilbao |
| 22:00 CEST (UTC+2) | Iturraspe (yellow card) 16'; Iroala (yellow card) 32'; Rico 33', (yellow card) 36'; Aduriz 35'; Susaeta (yellow card) 62'; San José (yellow card) 79' | Report | Bruno (yellow card) 37'; Pereira (yellow card) 41'; Trigueros (yellow card) 75' | Stadium: San Mamés; Attendance: 35,000; Referee: José Teixeira Vitienes |

| 27 October 2013 10 | Villarreal | 4–1 | Valencia | Villarreal |
| 17:00 CEST (UTC+2) | Uche 17'; Pérez 22'; Costa (yellow card) 43'; Dos Santos 49', 84'; Dorado (yellow card) 51'; Pina (yellow card) 87' | Report | Banega (yellow card) 48'; Fuego (yellow card) 54'; Canales (yellow card) 58'; Costa 63' | Stadium: El Madrigal; Attendance: 18,000; Referee: Carlos Clos Gómez |

| 31 October 2013 11 | Villarreal | 0–2 | Getafe | Villarreal |
| 20:00 CET (UTC+1) | Íñiguez (red card) 39'; Costa (yellow card) 86' | Report | Marica 5'; Lago (yellow card) 47'; Alexis (yellow card) 50'; Rafa (yellow card) 70'; Borja (yellow card) 81'; Sarabia 90+2' | Stadium: El Madrigal; Attendance: 16,000; Referee: Javier Estrada Fernández |

| 4 November 2013 12 | Elche | 0–1 | Villarreal | Elche |
| 22:00 CET (UTC+1) | Sánchez (yellow card) 32'; Pérez (yellow card) 63'; Cisma (yellow card) 87' | Report | Costa (yellow card) 28'; Trigueros (yellow card) 59'; Pereira (yellow card) 69'; Uche 89' | Stadium: Manuel Martínez Valero; Attendance: 20,020; Referee: Jesús Gil Manzano |

| 10 November 2013 13 | Villarreal | 1–1 | Atlético Madrid | Villarreal |
| 19:00 CET (UTC+1) | Bruno (yellow card) 18'; Costa (yellow card) 73'; Perbet (yellow card) 81' | Report | Mario 2' (o.g.); Tiago (yellow card) 20'; Gabi (yellow card) 52'; García (yellow card) 58'; Koke (yellow card) 75' | Stadium: El Madrigal; Attendance: 17,100; Referee: Pedro Pérez Montero |

| 24 November 2013 14 | Levante | 0–3 | Villarreal | Valencia |
| 12:00 CET (UTC+1) | Navas (red card) 10'; Juanfran (yellow card) 64' | Report | Bruno 13' (pen.); Musacchio (yellow card) 65'; Uche 74', 89' | Stadium: Ciutat de València; Attendance: 16,000; Referee: Alfonso Álvarez Izquierdo |

| 29 November 2013 15 | Villarreal | 1–1 | Málaga | Villarreal |
| 20:30 CET (UTC+1) | Bruno 32', (yellow card) 73' | Report | Camacho (yellow card) 19'; Juanmi (yellow card) 43'; Eliseu (yellow card) 52'; Anderson (yellow card) 87'; Weligton 90+4' | Stadium: El Madrigal; Attendance: 16,000; Referee: José González González |

| 14 December 2013 16 | Barcelona | 2–1 | Villarreal | Barcelona |
| 20:00 CET (UTC+1) | Neymar 30' (pen.), 68', (yellow card) 85' | Report | Trigueros (yellow card) 38'; Musacchio 48' | Stadium: Camp Nou; Attendance: 66,130; Referee: Ignacio Iglesias Villanueva |

| 21 December 2013 17 | Villarreal | 1–2 | Sevilla | Villarreal |
| 16:00 CET (UTC+1) | Costa (yellow card) 55'; Gabriel (yellow card) 58'; Perbet 88' (pen.); Pereira (yellow card) 90+2' | Report | Cala 24', (red card) 86'; Carriço (yellow card) 51'; Coke (yellow card) 69'; Bacca 71'; Iborra (yellow card) 76'; Beto (yellow card) 90' | Stadium: El Madrigal; Attendance: 20,000; Referee: Jesús Gil Manzano |

| 6 January 2014 18 | Rayo Vallecano | 2–5 | Villarreal | Madrid |
| 22:00 CET (UTC+1) | Trashorras (yellow card) 35'; Rodri (yellow card) 45'; Mojica (yellow card) 49'; Castillo 66', 90+1' (pen.) | Report | Uche 10', 57', 64', (yellow card) 90+1'; Perbet 12', 41', (yellow card) 75'; Pina (yellow card) 78' | Stadium: Vallecas; Attendance: 8,000; Referee: Alejandro Hernández Hernández |

| 13 January 2014 19 | Villarreal | 5–1 | Real Sociedad | Villarreal |
| 22:00 CET (UTC+1) | Costa (yellow card) 7'; Dos Santos 16', 33'; Bruno (yellow card) 20'; Uche 27', 55'; Gómez 58' | Report | José Ángel (yellow card) 2'; Agirretxe 60'; Ros (yellow card) 72'; Vela (yellow card) 72'; I. Martínez (yellow card) 76' | Stadium: El Madrigal; Attendance: 13,600; Referee: Carlos Velasco Carballo |

| 19 January 2014 20 | Villarreal | 2–0 | Almería | Villarreal |
| 17:00 CET (UTC+1) | Uche 3', (yellow card) 47'; Costa (yellow card) 82'; Bruno 87' (pen.) | Report | Dubarbier (yellow card) 70' | Stadium: El Madrigal; Attendance: 18,000; Referee: César Muñiz Fernández |

| 25 January 2014 21 | Valladolid | 1–0 | Villarreal | Valladolid |
| 18:00 CET (UTC+1) | Rueda 40'; Peña (yellow card) 55'; Rubio (yellow card) 66'; Guerra (yellow card) 72'; Rukavina (yellow card) 89' | Report | | Stadium: José Zorrilla; Attendance: 13,817; Referee: Carlos del Cerro Grande |

| 3 February 2014 22 | Villarreal | 3–1 | Osasuna | Villarreal |
| 22:00 CET (UTC+1) | Pina (yellow card) 23'; Dos Santos (yellow card) 45'; Perbet 46', 75'; Trigueros 55' | Report | Loé (yellow card) 69'; Riera 87' | Stadium: El Madrigal; Attendance: 16,500; Referee: Alfonso Álvarez Izquierdo |

| 8 February 2014 23 | Real Madrid | 4–2 | Villarreal | Madrid |
| 20:00 CET (UTC+1) | Bale 7'; Benzema 25', 76'; Jesé 64' | Report | Mario 43', (yellow card) 59'; Costa (yellow card) 54'; Dos Santos 69' | Stadium: Santiago Bernabéu; Attendance: 75,624; Referee: José González González |

| 15 February 2014 24 | Villarreal | 0–2 | Celta Vigo | Villarreal |
| 22:00 CET (UTC+1) | Jokić (yellow card) 9'; Musacchio (yellow card) 66' | Report | Cabral (yellow card) 30'; Aurtenetxe (yellow card) 40'; Fernández (yellow card) 57'; Orellana 83'; Nolito 90', (yellow card) 90+1' | Stadium: El Madrigal; Attendance: 14,195; Referee: David Fernández Borbalán |

| 24 February 2014 25 | Espanyol | 1–2 | Villarreal | Cornellà de Llobregat |
| 22:00 CET (UTC+1) | Sánchez (yellow card) 46'; Stuani (yellow card) 60'; Córdoba 77'; Moreno (yellow card) 80'; Colotto (yellow card) 82' | Report | Gómez 36'; Dos Santos (yellow card) 43'; Perbet 50'; Uche (yellow card) 85'; Asenjo (yellow card) 90'; Gabriel (yellow card) 90' | Stadium: Cornellà-El Prat; Attendance: 12,650; Referee: José Teixeira Vitienes |

| 2 March 2014 26 | Villarreal | 1–1 | Betis | Villarreal |
| 12:00 CET (UTC+1) | Bruno 71' (pen.); Jokić (yellow card) 80'; Uche (yellow card) 80' | Report | Vilà (yellow card) 45+1'; Sevilla (yellow card) 53'; Amaya (yellow card) 68'; Chica (yellow card) 69'; Castro 85' | Stadium: El Madrigal; Attendance: 18,693; Referee: Ignacio Iglesias Villanueva |

| 8 March 2014 27 | Granada | 2–0 | Villarreal | Granada |
| 22:00 CET (UTC+1) | Rico 23'; Riki (yellow card) 25'; El-Arabi 33'; Brahimi (yellow card) 65'; Iturra (yellow card) 83'; Recio (yellow card) 90+2' | Report | Gabriel (yellow card) 46' | Stadium: Los Cármenes; Attendance: 13,612; Referee: César Muñiz Fernández |

| 17 March 2014 28 | Villarreal | 1–1 | Athletic Bilbao | Villarreal |
| 22:00 CET (UTC+1) | Jokić (yellow card) 31'; Gabriel (yellow card) 39' (yellow-red card) 65'; Pina 47' | Report | Aduriz (yellow card) 32', (goal) 83'; Gurpegui (yellow card) 36' | Stadium: El Madrigal; Attendance: 25,500; Referee: José González González |

| 23 March 2014 29 | Valencia | 2–1 | Villarreal | Valencia |
| 19:00 CET (UTC+1) | Fuego 35', 44'; Pereira (yellow card) 45+1'; Cartabia (yellow card) 77' | Report | Pina (yellow card) 35'; Cani (yellow card) 45'; Óliver (yellow card) 62'; Dos Santos 83' | Stadium: Mestalla; Attendance: 37,214; Referee: Pedro Pérez Montero |

| 27 March 2014 30 | Getafe | 0–1 | Villarreal | Getafe |
| 20:00 CET (UTC+1) | Míchel (yellow card) 79'; Valera (yellow card) 81'; Mosquera (yellow card) 82' | Report | Perbet 5'; Jokić (yellow card) 12'; Óliver (yellow card) 24' | Stadium: Coliseum Alfonso Pérez; Attendance: 4,500; Referee: Carlos Clos Gómez |

| 30 March 2014 31 | Villarreal | 1–1 | Elche | Villarreal |
| 19:00 CEST (UTC+2) | Pereira 43'; Costa (yellow card) 85' | Report | Suárez (yellow card) 3', (goal) 31' | Stadium: El Madrigal; Attendance: 15,172; Referee: Alberto Undiano Mallenco |

| 5 April 2014 32 | Atlético Madrid | 1–0 | Villarreal | Madrid |
| 16:00 CEST (UTC+2) | García 14', (yellow card) 69'; Koke (yellow card) 67'; Suárez (yellow card) 80' | Report | Gabriel (yellow card) 42' | Stadium: Vicente Calderón; Attendance: 50,000; Referee: Jesús Gil Manzano |

| 12 April 2014 33 | Villarreal | 1–0 | Levante | Villarreal |
| 18:00 CEST (UTC+2) | Trigueros (yellow card) 74'; Pantić (yellow card) 90+1'; Perbet 90+5' | Report | Diop (yellow card) 80'; Karabelas (yellow card) 90+5' | Stadium: El Madrigal; Attendance: 20,600; Referee: Alejandro Hernández Hernández |

| 21 April 2014 34 | Málaga | 2–0 | Villarreal | Málaga |
| 22:00 CEST (UTC+2) | Santa Cruz 6'; Samu (yellow card) 43'; Darder 53'; Ferreira (yellow card) 64'; Camacho (yellow card) 71'; Amrabat (red card) 73' | Report | Aquino (yellow card) 15'; Musacchio (yellow card) 47'; Pina (yellow card) 71' | Stadium: La Rosaleda; Attendance: 15,789; Referee: Alfonso Álvarez Izquierdo |

| 27 April 2014 35 | Villarreal | 2–3 | Barcelona | Villarreal |
| 21:00 CEST (UTC+2) | Cani 45+1', (yellow card) 90'; Trigueros 55', (yellow card) 89'; Mario (yellow card) 56' | Report | Sánchez (yellow card) 50'; Gabriel 65' (o.g.); Musacchio 78' (o.g.); Messi 83'; Busquets (yellow card) 85' | Stadium: El Madrigal; Attendance: 22,839; Referee: David Fernández Borbalán |

| 4 May 2014 36 | Sevilla | 0–0 | Villarreal | Seville |
| 19:00 CEST (UTC+2) | | Report | | Stadium: Ramón Sánchez Pizjuán; Attendance: 31,372; Referee: Eduardo Prieto Iglesias |

| 10 May 2014 37 | Villarreal | 4–0 | Rayo Vallecano | Villarreal |
| 20:00 CEST (UTC+2) | Uche 22'; Bruno 42'; Pereira 55'; Costa 64'; Trigueros (yellow card) 71' | Report | Arbilla (red card) 63'; Gálvez (yellow card) 82' | Stadium: El Madrigal; Attendance: 13,492; Referee: José González González |

| 18 May 2014 38 | Real Sociedad | 1–2 | Villarreal | San Sebastián |
| 12:00 CEST (UTC+2) | Bergara (yellow card) 67'; Granero (yellow card) 86'; Vela 90+3' | Report | Dos Santos 26'; Jokić (yellow card) 44'; Musacchio (yellow card) 61'; Uche 69'; Costa (yellow card) 89' | Stadium: Anoeta; Attendance: 21,140; Referee: Carlos Velasco Carballo |

=== Copa del Rey ===
==== Round of 32 ====
| 6 December 2013 First leg | Villarreal | 2–2 | Elche | Villarreal |
| 16:00 CET (UTC+1) | Dos Santos 22'; Dorado (yellow card) 27'; Perbet (yellow card) 70'; Aquino 90+4' | Report | Botía (yellow card) 36'; Pelegrín 61'; Boakye (yellow card) 62', (goal) 66' | Stadium: El Madrigal; Attendance: 15,000; Referee: Carlos Clos Gómez |

| 17 December 2013 Second leg | Elche | 0–1 (2–3 agg.) | Villarreal | Elche |
| 20:00 CET (UTC+1) | Flores (yellow card) 52'; Márquez (yellow card) 67'; Săpunaru (yellow card) 69' | Report | Pantić (yellow card) 36'; Perbet 55'; Bruno (yellow card) 65'; Costa (yellow card) 69' | Stadium: Manuel Martínez Valero; Attendance: 17,307; Referee: Alfonso Álvarez Izquierdo |

==== Round of 16 ====
| 9 January 2014 First leg | Real Sociedad | 0–0 | Villarreal | San Sebastián |
| 19:30 CET (UTC+1) | | Report | Jokić (yellow card) 41' | Stadium: Anoeta; Referee: Alberto Undiano Mallenco |

| 16 January 2014 Second leg | Villarreal | 0–1 (0–1 agg.) | Real Sociedad | Villarreal |
| 13:00 CET (UTC+1) | Jokić (yellow card) 23'; Pérez (yellow card) 76' | Report | Ros 32' | Stadium: El Madrigal; Attendance: 15,000; Referee: Eduardo Prieto Iglesias |
