= 2008–09 Villarreal CF season =

Villarreal
2008–09 season
- Owner: Fernando Roig
- President: Fernando Roig
- Head coach: Manuel Pellegrini
- Stadium: El Madrigal
- La Liga: 5th
- Copa del Rey: Round of 32
- UEFA Champions League: Quarter-finals
- Top goalscorer: League: Joseba Llorente (15); All: Joseba Llorente (19)
| Home colours | Away colours |

The 2008–09 season was Villarreal Club de Fútbol's 86th season in existence and the club's 9th consecutive season in the top flight of Spanish football. In addition to the domestic league, Villarreal participated in this season's editions of the Copa del Rey and the UEFA Champions League. The season covered the period from 1 July 2008 to 30 June 2009.

== Players ==
=== First-team squad ===
Note: Flags indicate national team as defined under FIFA eligibility rules; some limited exceptions apply. Players may hold more than one non-FIFA nationality.

| No. | Pos. | Nation | Player |
|---|---|---|---|
| 1 | GK | URU | Sebastián Viera |
| 2 | DF | ARG | Gonzalo Rodríguez |
| 4 | DF | URU | Diego Godín |
| 5 | DF | ESP | Joan Capdevila |
| 6 | MF | URU | Sebastián Eguren |
| 7 | MF | FRA | Robert Pires |
| 8 | MF | ESP | Santi Cazorla |
| 9 | FW | MEX | Guillermo Franco |
| 10 | MF | ESP | Cani |
| 11 | MF | ARG | Ariel Ibagaza |
| 12 | DF | FRA | Pascal Cygan |
| 13 | GK | ESP | Diego López |
| 14 | MF | CHI | Mati Fernández |
| 15 | FW | TUR | Nihat |

| No. | Pos. | Nation | Player |
|---|---|---|---|
| 16 | FW | ESP | Joseba Llorente |
| 17 | DF | ESP | Javi Venta |
| 18 | DF | ESP | Ángel |
| 19 | MF | ESP | Marcos Senna (captain) |
| 20 | DF | ARG | Fabricio Fuentes |
| 21 | MF | ESP | Bruno Soriano |
| 22 | FW | ITA | Giuseppe Rossi |
| 26 | GK | ESP | Juan Carlos |
| 27 | MF | ESP | Jordi Pablo |
| 29 | DF | ESP | Mario Gaspar |
| 30 | FW | ESP | Joan Tomás |
| 36 | DF | ESP | Kiko |
| — | MF | ECU | Jefferson Montero |

=== Out on loan ===
Note: Flags indicate national team as defined under FIFA eligibility rules; some limited exceptions apply. Players may hold more than one non-FIFA nationality.

| No. | Pos. | Nation | Player |
|---|---|---|---|
| — | FW | USA | Jozy Altidore (to Xerez) |
| — | MF | ARG | Damián Escudero (to Real Valladolid) |
| — | FW | URU | Robert Flores (to River Plate) |
| — | MF | ESP | Marquitos (to Real Sociedad) |
| — | FW | ARG | Marco Ruben (to Huelva) |
| — | FW | CHI | Mathias Vidangossy (to Everton Viña del Mar) |
| — | FW | ESP | Jonathan Pereira (to Racing de Santander) |

== Competitions ==
=== Overall record ===
| Competition | First match | Last match | Starting round | Final position | Record | | | | | | | |
| Competition | First match | Last match | Starting round | Final position | Pld | W | D | L | GF | GA | GD | Win % |
|---|---|---|---|---|---|---|---|---|---|---|---|---|
| La Liga | 31 August 2008 | 30 May 2009 | Matchday 1 | 5th | 38 | 18 | 11 | 9 | 61 | 54 | +7 | 47.37 |
| Copa del Rey | 29 October 2008 | 12 November 2008 | Round of 32 | Round of 32 | 2 | 0 | 1 | 1 | 1 | 6 | −5 | 0.00 |
| UEFA Champions League | 17 September 2008 | 15 April 2009 | Group stage | Quarter-finals | 10 | 3 | 5 | 2 | 13 | 13 | +0 | 30.00 |
| Total | | | | | 50 | 21 | 17 | 12 | 75 | 73 | +2 | 42.00 |

Source: Competitions

=== La Liga ===
==== League table ====
| Pos | Team | Pld | W | D | L | GF | GA | GD | Pts | Qualification or relegation |
|---|---|---|---|---|---|---|---|---|---|---|
| 3 | Sevilla | 38 | 21 | 7 | 10 | 54 | 39 | +15 | 70 | Qualification for the Champions League group stage |
| 4 | Atlético Madrid | 38 | 20 | 7 | 11 | 80 | 57 | +23 | 67 | Qualification for the Champions League play-off round |
| 5 | Villarreal | 38 | 18 | 11 | 9 | 61 | 54 | +7 | 65 | Qualification for the Europa League play-off round |
| 6 | Valencia | 38 | 18 | 8 | 12 | 68 | 54 | +14 | 62 | Qualification for the Europa League play-off round |
| 7 | Deportivo La Coruña | 38 | 16 | 10 | 12 | 48 | 47 | +1 | 58 | |

Source: LFP and Yahoo! Sport
Rules for classification: 1) points; 2) head-to-head points; 3) head-to-head goal difference; 4) head-to-head goals scored; 5) goal difference; 6) number of goals scored.

==== Results summary ====
| Overall | | | | | | | | Home | | | | | | Away | | | | | |
| Pld | W | D | L | GF | GA | GD | Pts | W | D | L | GF | GA | GD | W | D | L | GF | GA | GD |
|---|---|---|---|---|---|---|---|---|---|---|---|---|---|---|---|---|---|---|---|
| 38 | 18 | 11 | 9 | 61 | 54 | +7 | 65 | 12 | 3 | 4 | 33 | 25 | +8 | 6 | 8 | 5 | 28 | 29 | −1 |

Source: Scoreboard

==== Results by round ====
| Round | 1 | 2 | 3 | 4 | 5 | 6 | 7 | 8 | 9 | 10 | 11 | 12 | 13 | 14 | 15 | 16 | 17 | 18 | 19 | 20 | 21 | 22 | 23 | 24 | 25 | 26 | 27 | 28 | 29 | 30 | 31 | 32 | 33 | 34 | 35 | 36 | 37 | 38 |
|---|---|---|---|---|---|---|---|---|---|---|---|---|---|---|---|---|---|---|---|---|---|---|---|---|---|---|---|---|---|---|---|---|---|---|---|---|---|---|
| Ground | A | H | A | H | A | H | A | H | A | H | A | H | A | H | A | H | A | A | H | H | A | H | A | H | A | H | A | H | A | H | A | H | A | H | A | H | H | A |
| Result | D | W | W | W | W | W | D | D | W | W | D | L | W | D | L | L | L | D | W | D | L | W | D | W | D | W | L | W | L | L | D | W | W | L | D | W | W | W |
| Position | 9 | 6 | 3 | 2 | 2 | 2 | 3 | 4 | 2 | 2 | 2 | 3 | 2 | 2 | 4 | 6 | 7 | 6 | 5 | 5 | 5 | 5 | 5 | 4 | 4 | 4 | 4 | 4 | 4 | 5 | 6 | 5 | 5 | 6 | 7 | 6 | 5 | 5 |

Source: BDFutbol
A = Away; H = Home; W = Win; D = Draw; L = Loss

==== Matches ====
| 31 August 2008 1 | Osasuna | 1–1 | Villarreal | Pamplona |
| 19:00 CEST (UTC+2) | | | | Stadium: El Sadar |

| 14 September 2008 2 | Villarreal | 1–0 | Deportivo La Coruña | Villarreal |
| 17:00 CEST (UTC+2) | | | | Stadium: El Madrigal |

| 21 September 2008 3 | Numancia | 1–2 | Villarreal | Soria |
| 17:00 CEST (UTC+2) | | | | Stadium: Nuevo Estadio Los Pajaritos |

| 24 September 2008 4 | Villarreal | 2–0 | Racing Santander | Villarreal |
| 20:00 CEST (UTC+2) | | | | Stadium: El Madrigal |

| 27 September 2008 5 | Sporting Gijón | 0–1 | Villarreal | Gijón |
| 20:00 CEST (UTC+2) | | | | Stadium: El Molinón |

| 4 October 2008 6 | Villarreal | 2–1 | Real Betis | Villarreal |
| 20:00 CEST (UTC+2) | | | | Stadium: El Madrigal |

| 18 October 2008 7 | Espanyol | 0–0 | Villarreal | Barcelona |
| 22:00 CEST (UTC+2) | | | | Stadium: Estadi Olímpic Lluís Companys |

| 26 October 2008 8 | Villarreal | 4–4 | Atlético Madrid | Villarreal |
| 19:00 CET (UTC+1) | | | | Stadium: El Madrigal |

| 1 November 2008 9 | Athletic Bilbao | 1–4 | Villarreal | Bilbao |
| 20:00 CET (UTC+1) | | | | Stadium: San Mamés |

| 9 November 2008 10 | Villarreal | 2–1 | Almería | Villarreal |
| 17:00 CET (UTC+1) | | | | Stadium: El Madrigal |

| 16 November 2008 11 | Málaga | 2–2 | Villarreal | Málaga |
| 17:00 CET (UTC+1) | | | | Stadium: La Rosaleda |

| 22 November 2008 12 | Villarreal | 0–3 | Valladolid | Villarreal |
| 20:00 CET (UTC+1) | | | | Stadium: El Madrigal |

| 30 November 2008 13 | Recreativo | 1–2 | Villarreal | Huelva |
| 17:00 CET (UTC+1) | | | | Stadium: Nuevo Colombino |

| 6 December 2008 14 | Villarreal | 3–3 | Getafe | Villarreal |
| 20:00 CET (UTC+1) | | | | Stadium: El Madrigal |

| 14 December 2008 15 | Sevilla | 1–0 | Villarreal | Seville |
| 19:00 CET (UTC+1) | | | | Stadium: Ramón Sánchez Pizjuán |

| 21 December 2008 16 | Villarreal | 1–2 | Barcelona | Villarreal |
| 19:00 CET (UTC+1) | | | | Stadium: El Madrigal |

| 4 January 2009 17 | Real Madrid | 1–0 | Villarreal | Madrid |
| 17:00 CET (UTC+1) | | | | Stadium: Santiago Bernabéu |

| 10 January 2009 18 | Valencia | 3–3 | Villarreal | Valencia |
| 22:00 CET (UTC+1) | | | | Stadium: Mestalla |

| 18 January 2009 19 | Villarreal | 2–0 | Mallorca | Villarreal |
| 17:00 CET (UTC+1) | | | | Stadium: El Madrigal |

| 24 January 2009 20 | Villarreal | 1–1 | Osasuna | Villarreal |
| 20:00 CET (UTC+1) | | | | Stadium: El Madrigal |

| 1 February 2009 21 | Deportivo La Coruña | 3–0 | Villarreal | A Coruña |
| 17:00 CET (UTC+1) | | | | Stadium: Riazor |

| 8 February 2009 22 | Villarreal | 2–1 | Numancia | Villarreal |
| 17:00 CET (UTC+1) | | | | Stadium: El Madrigal |

| 15 February 2009 23 | Racing Santander | 1–1 | Villarreal | Santander |
| 17:00 CET (UTC+1) | | | | Stadium: El Sardinero |

| 21 February 2009 24 | Villarreal | 2–1 | Sporting Gijón | Villarreal |
| 20:00 CET (UTC+1) | | | | Stadium: El Madrigal |

| 1 March 2009 25 | Real Betis | 2–2 | Villarreal | Seville |
| 21:00 CET (UTC+1) | | | | Stadium: Manuel Ruiz de Lopera |

| 7 March 2009 26 | Villarreal | 1–0 | Espanyol | Villarreal |
| 22:00 CET (UTC+1) | | | | Stadium: El Madrigal |

| 15 March 2009 27 | Atlético Madrid | 3–2 | Villarreal | Madrid |
| 19:00 CET (UTC+1) | | | | Stadium: Vicente Calderón |

| 21 March 2009 29 | Villarreal | 2–0 | Athletic Bilbao | Villarreal |
| 20:00 CET (UTC+1) | | | | Stadium: El Madrigal |

| 4 April 2009 29 | Almería | 3–0 | Villarreal | Almería |
| 20:00 CEST (UTC+2) | | | | Stadium: Juegos Mediterráneos |

| 11 April 2009 30 | Villarreal | 0–2 | Málaga | Villarreal |
| 22:00 CEST (UTC+2) | | | | Stadium: El Madrigal |

| 19 April 2009 31 | Valladolid | 0–0 | Villarreal | Valladolid |
| 17:00 CEST (UTC+2) | | | | Stadium: José Zorrilla |

| 23 April 2009 32 | Villarreal | 2–1 | Recreativo | Villarreal |
| 20:00 CEST (UTC+2) | | | | Stadium: El Madrigal |

| 26 April 2009 33 | Getafe | 1–2 | Villarreal | Getafe |
| 17:00 CEST (UTC+2) | | | | Stadium: Coliseum Alfonso Pérez |

| 2 May 2009 34 | Villarreal | 0–2 | Sevilla | Villarreal |
| 22:00 CEST (UTC+2) | | | | Stadium: El Madrigal |

| 10 May 2009 35 | Barcelona | 3–3 | Villarreal | Barcelona |
| 19:00 CEST (UTC+2) | | | | Stadium: Camp Nou |

| 16 May 2009 36 | Villarreal | 3–2 | Real Madrid | Villarreal |
| 22:00 CEST (UTC+2) | | | | Stadium: El Madrigal |

| 23 May 2009 37 | Villarreal | 3–1 | Valencia | Villarreal |
| 21:00 CEST (UTC+2) | | | | Stadium: El Madrigal |

| 30 May 2009 38 | Mallorca | 2–3 | Villarreal | Palma |
| 21:00 CEST (UTC+2) | | | | Stadium: Ono Estadi |

=== Copa del Rey ===
==== Round of 32 ====
| 29 October 2008 First leg | Poli Ejido | 5–0 | Villarreal | El Ejido |
| --:-- CET (UTC+1) | | | | Stadium: Santo Domingo |

| 12 November 2008 Second leg | Villarreal | 1–1 (1–6 agg.) | Poli Ejido | Villarreal |
| --:-- CET (UTC+1) | | | | Stadium: El Madrigal |

=== UEFA Champions League ===
==== Group stage ====
The group stage draw was held on 28 August 2008.

| Pos | Team | Pld | W | D | L | GF | GA | GD | Pts | Qualification | MUN | VIL | AAB | CEL |
|---|---|---|---|---|---|---|---|---|---|---|---|---|---|---|
| 1 | (England) Manchester United | 6 | 2 | 4 | 0 | 9 | 3 | +6 | 10 | Advance to knockout phase | — | 0–0 | 2–2 | 3–0 |
| 2 | (Spain) Villarreal | 6 | 2 | 3 | 1 | 9 | 7 | +2 | 9 | Advance to knockout phase | 0–0 | — | 6–3 | 1–0 |
| 3 | (Denmark) AaB | 6 | 1 | 3 | 2 | 9 | 14 | −5 | 6 | Transfer to UEFA Cup | 0–3 | 2–2 | — | 2–1 |
| 4 | (Scotland) Celtic | 6 | 1 | 2 | 3 | 4 | 7 | −3 | 5 | | 1–1 | 2–0 | 0–0 | — |

Source: RSSSF

| 17 September 2008 1 | Manchester United (England) | 0–0 | (Spain) Villarreal | Manchester, England |
| 20:45 CEST (UTC+2) | | Report | | Stadium: Old Trafford; Attendance: 74,944; Referee: Wolfgang Stark (Germany) |

| 30 September 2008 2 | Villarreal (Spain) | 1–0 | (Scotland) Celtic | Villarreal, Spain |
| 20:45 CEST (UTC+2) | Senna 67' | Report | | Stadium: El Madrigal; Attendance: 21,515; Referee: Viktor Kassai (Hungary) |

| 21 October 2008 3 | Villarreal (Spain) | 6–3 | (Denmark) Aalborg BK | Villarreal, Spain |
| 20:45 CEST (UTC+2) | Rossi 28'; Capdevila 33'; Llorente 67', 70', 84'; Pires 79' | Report | Saganowski 19'; Enevoldsen 36'; Johansson 77' | Stadium: El Madrigal; Attendance: 15,959; Referee: Florian Meyer (Germany) |

| 5 November 2008 4 | Aalborg BK (Denmark) | 2–2 | (Spain) Villarreal | Aalborg, Denmark |
| 20:45 CET (UTC+1) | Curth 54'; Due 81' | Report | Rossi 41'; Franco 75' | Stadium: Aalborg Stadion; Attendance: 10,355; Referee: Bertrand Layec (France) |

| 25 November 2008 5 | Villarreal (Spain) | 0–0 | (England) Manchester United | Villarreal, Spain |
| 20:45 CET (UTC+1) | | Report | | Stadium: El Madrigal; Attendance: 22,529; Referee: Roberto Rosetti (Italy) |

| 10 December 2008 6 | Celtic (Scotland) | 2–0 | (Spain) Villarreal | Glasgow, Scotland |
| 20:45 CET (UTC+1) | Maloney 14'; McGeady 45+2' | Report | | Stadium: Celtic Park; Attendance: 58,014; Referee: Claudio Circhetta (Switzerland) |

==== Knockout phase ====
===== Round of 16 =====
The draw for the round of 16 was held on 19 December 2008.

| 25 February 2009 First leg | Villarreal (Spain) | 1–1 | (Greece) Panathinaikos | Villarreal, Spain |
| 20:45 CET (UTC+1) | Rossi 67' (pen.) | Report | Karagounis 59' | Stadium: El Madrigal; Attendance: 21,810; Referee: Konrad Plautz (Austria) |

| 10 March 2009 Second leg | Panathinaikos (Greece) | 1–2 (2–3 agg.) | (Spain) Villarreal | Athens, Greece |
| 20:45 CET (UTC+1) | Mantzios 55' | Report | Ibagaza 49'; Llorente 70' | Stadium: Olympic Stadium; Attendance: 60,616; Referee: Massimo Busacca (Switzerland) |

===== Quarter-finals =====
The draw for the quarter-finals was held on 20 March 2009.

| 7 April 2009 First leg | Villarreal (Spain) | 1–1 | (England) Arsenal | Villarreal, Spain |
| 20:45 CEST (UTC+2) | Senna 10' | Report | Adebayor 66' | Stadium: El Madrigal; Attendance: 21,577; Referee: Tom Henning Øvrebø (Norway) |

| 15 April 2009 Second leg | Arsenal (England) | 3–0 (4–1 agg.) | (Spain) Villarreal | London, England |
| 20:45 CEST (UTC+2) | Walcott 10'; Adebayor 60'; Van Persie 69' (pen.) | Report | | Stadium: Emirates Stadium; Attendance: 59,233; Referee: Wolfgang Stark (Germany) |
