= 2015–16 Villarreal CF season =

Villarreal
2015–16 season
- President: Fernando Roig
- Head coach: Marcelino
- Stadium: El Madrigal
- La Liga: 4th
- Copa del Rey: Round of 16
- UEFA Europa League: Semi-finals
- Top goalscorer: League: Cédric Bakambu (12); All: Cédric Bakambu (22)
Home colours	Away colours	Third colours

The 2015–16 season was Villarreal Club de Fútbol's 93rd season in existence and the club's 3rd consecutive season in the top flight of Spanish football. In addition to the domestic league, Villarreal participated in this season's editions of the Copa del Rey and the UEFA Europa League. The season covered the period from 1 July 2015 to 30 June 2016.

== Players ==
=== Current squad ===
As of 31 August 2015

Note: Flags indicate national team as defined under FIFA eligibility rules; some limited exceptions apply. Players may hold more than one non-FIFA nationality.

No.	Pos.	Nation	Player
1	GK	ESP	Sergio Asenjo
2	DF	ESP	Mario (vice-captain)
3	DF	SLO	Bojan Jokić
4	MF	ESP	Tomás Pina
5	DF	ARG	Mateo Musacchio
6	DF	ESP	Víctor Ruiz
7	MF	ESP	Samu
8	MF	MEX	Jonathan dos Santos
9	FW	ESP	Roberto Soldado
10	FW	BRA	Léo Baptistão (on loan from Atlético Madrid)
11	DF	ESP	Jaume Costa
13	GK	FRA	Alphonse Areola (on loan from Paris Saint-Germain)
14	MF	ESP	Manu Trigueros

No.	Pos.	Nation	Player
17	FW	COD	Cédric Bakambu
18	MF	ESP	Denis Suárez
19	MF	ESP	Samu Castillejo
20	FW	ESP	Adrián (on loan from Porto)
21	MF	ESP	Bruno (captain)
22	DF	SRB	Antonio Rukavina
23	DF	ITA	Daniele Bonera
24	DF	CIV	Eric Bailly
25	GK	ARG	Mariano Barbosa
26	MF	ESP	Matías Nahuel
27	DF	ESP	Adrián Marín
28	MF	ESP	Alfonso Pedraza
44	DF	ESP	Pablo Íñiguez

=== Out on loan ===
Note: Flags indicate national team as defined under FIFA eligibility rules; some limited exceptions apply. Players may hold more than one non-FIFA nationality.

No.	Pos.	Nation	Player
—	DF	SRB	Aleksandar Pantić (on loan at Eibar)
—	MF	ESP	Javier Espinosa (on loan at Elche)
—	MF	ESP	Moi Gómez (on loan at Getafe)
—	MF	ESP	Sergio Marcos (on loan at Lugo)

== Competitions ==
=== Overall record ===
Competition	First match	Last match	Starting round	Final position	Record							
Competition	First match	Last match	Starting round	Final position	Pld	W	D	L	GF	GA	GD	Win %
La Liga	23 August 2015	15 May 2016	Matchday 1	4th	38	18	10	10	44	35	+9	47.37
Copa del Rey	3 December 2015	13 January 2016	Round of 32	Round of 16	4	1	0	3	6	7	−1	25.00
UEFA Europa League	17 September 2015	5 May 2016	Group stage	Semi-finals	14	9	3	2	23	13	+10	64.29
Total					56	28	13	15	73	55	+18	50.00

Source: Competitions

=== La Liga ===
==== League table ====
Pos	Team	Pld	W	D	L	GF	GA	GD	Pts	Qualification or relegation
2	Real Madrid	38	28	6	4	110	34	+76	90	Qualification for the Champions League group stage
3	Atlético Madrid	38	28	4	6	63	18	+45	88	Qualification for the Champions League group stage
4	Villarreal	38	18	10	10	44	35	+9	64	Qualification for the Champions League play-off round
5	Athletic Bilbao	38	18	8	12	58	45	+13	62	Qualification for the Europa League group stage (Note: Since the winners of the 2015–16 Copa del Rey, Barcelona, qualified for European competition based on league position, the spot awarded to the cup winners (Europa League group stage) was passed to the sixth-placed team and the spot awarded to the sixth-placed team (Europa League third qualifying round) was passed to the seventh-placed team.)
6	Celta Vigo	38	17	9	12	51	59	−8	60	Qualification for the Europa League group stage

Source: La Liga, Soccerway
Rules for classification: 1) Points; 2) Head-to-head points; 3) Head-to-head goal difference; 4) Goal difference; 5) Goals scored; 6) Fair-play points; 7) Play-off.

==== Results summary ====
Overall								Home						Away					
Pld	W	D	L	GF	GA	GD	Pts	W	D	L	GF	GA	GD	W	D	L	GF	GA	GD
38	18	10	10	44	35	+9	64	12	4	3	26	12	+14	6	6	7	18	23	−5

Source: Competitive matches

==== Results by round ====
Round	1	2	3	4	5	6	7	8	9	10	11	12	13	14	15	16	17	18	19	20	21	22	23	24	25	26	27	28	29	30	31	32	33	34	35	36	37	38
Ground	A	H	A	H	A	H	A	H	A	H	A	H	A	H	A	H	H	A	H	H	A	H	A	H	A	H	A	H	A	H	A	H	A	H	A	A	H	A
Result	D	W	W	W	W	W	L	L	D	W	L	D	L	W	W	W	W	W	W	D	D	W	D	W	D	W	D	L	L	D	W	W	L	L	D	W	L	L
Position	7	6	4	3	3	1	1	5	5	5	5	4	6	5	5	5	4	4	4	4	4	4	4	4	4	4	4	4	4	4	4	4	4	4	4	4	4	4

Source: Competitive matches
A = Away; H = Home; W = Win; D = Draw; L = Loss

==== Matches ====
Win Draw Loss

23 August 2015 1	Real Betis	1–1	Villarreal	Seville
22:30 CEST (UTC+2)	Bruno G. (yellow card) 26'; Cejudo (yellow card) 35'; Pezzella (yellow card) 50'; Castro 87'	Report	Soldado 31'; Castillejo (yellow card) 49'; Bruno S. (red card) 90+2'	Stadium: Benito Villamarín; Attendance: 37,996; Referee: Iñaki Vicandi Garrido

28 August 2015 2	Villarreal	3–1	Espanyol	Villarreal
20:30 CEST (UTC+2)	Soldado 67'; Bailly (yellow card) 85'; Bakambu 87', 90+3'	Report	Caicedo 5', (yellow card) 35'; Pau (yellow card) 19'; López (yellow card) 27'; Montañés (yellow card) 30'; Raillo (yellow card) 48'; Arbilla (yellow card) 55'	Stadium: El Madrigal; Attendance: 16,722; Referee: Carlos Velasco Carballo

13 September 2015 3	Granada	1–3	Villarreal	Granada
12:00 CEST (UTC+2)	Babin (yellow card) 11'; Lopes (yellow card) 65'; Rico 74'	Report	Pina (yellow card) 14'; Trigueros 49'; Bakambu 51'; Soldado (yellow card) 67'; Baily (yellow card) 81'; Areola (yellow card) 90'; Samu 90+1'	Stadium: Los Cármenes; Attendance: 13,954; Referee: Jesús Gil Manzano

20 September 2015 4	Villarreal	3–1	Athletic Bilbao	Villarreal
18:15 CEST (UTC+2)	Bruno (yellow card) 23', (goal) 42' (pen.); Baptistão (yellow card) 44', (goal) 79'; Matías Nahuel (yellow card) 49'; Bailly (yellow card) 59'; Mario 66'	Report	Laporte (yellow card) 11'; Gurpegi (yellow card) 48'; Aduriz (yellow card) 64', (goal) 90+2'; De Marcos (yellow card) 87'	Stadium: El Madrigal; Attendance: 19,832; Referee: Carlos Clos Gómez

23 September 2015 5	Málaga	0–1	Villarreal	Málaga
18:15 CEST (UTC+2)	Recio (yellow card) 39'; Boka (yellow card) 61'	Report	Dos Santos (yellow card) 17'; Bailly (yellow card) 67'; Tissone 71'; Suárez (yellow card) 79'	Stadium: La Rosaleda; Attendance: 18,647; Referee: Ricardo de Burgos Bengoetxea

26 September 2015 6	Villarreal	1–0	Atlético Madrid	Villarreal
20:30 CEST (UTC+2)	Baptistão 14'; Soldado (yellow card) 51'; Costa (yellow card) 84'	Report	Griezmann (yellow card) 41'; Tiago (yellow card) 71'	Stadium: El Madrigal; Attendance: 20,087; Referee: David Fernández Borbalán

4 October 2015 7	Levante	1–0	Villarreal	Valencia
18:15 CEST (UTC+2)	Juanfran (yellow card) 19'; Morales (yellow card) 50'; Deyverson 83'; José Mari (yellow card) 84'; Rubén (yellow card) 90+2'	Report	Jokić (yellow card) 4' (yellow-red card) 36'; Costa (yellow card) 60'; Soldado (yellow card) 84'; Ruiz (yellow card) 87'	Stadium: Ciutat de València; Attendance: 16,059; Referee: Alfonso Álvarez Izquierdo

18 October 2015 8	Villarreal	1–2	Celta Vigo	Villarreal
12:00 CEST (UTC+2)	Bailly (yellow card) 36' (yellow-red card) 47'; Suárez 67'; Soldado (yellow card) 71'	report	Fernández (yellow card) 36'; Gómez (yellow card) 37'; Orellana 41'; Wass (yellow card) 43'; Nolito 90'	Stadium: El Madrigal; Attendance: 17,436; Referee: José González González

25 October 2015 9	Las Palmas	0–0	Villarreal	Las Palmas
16:00 CEST (UTC+2)	Bigas (yellow card) 63'	Report	Samu (yellow card) 86'; Rukavina (yellow card) 90+2'	Stadium: Gran Canaria; Attendance: 18,517; Referee: Xavier Estrada Fernández

31 October 2015 10	Villarreal	2–1	Sevilla	Villarreal
18:15 CET (UTC+1)	Bailly (yellow card) 10'; Mario 25'; Bakambu (yellow card) 32', (goal) 61'; Soldado (yellow card) 50'; Costa (yellow card) 82'; Ruiz (yellow card) 90+4'	Report	Iborra (yellow card) 29'; Rami (yellow card) 63'; Llorente 76'; Konoplyanka (yellow card) 87'	Stadium: El Madrigal; Attendance: 16,730; Referee: José María Sánchez Martínez

8 November 2015 11	Barcelona	3–0	Villarreal	Barcelona
16:00 CET (UTC+1)	Mathieu (yellow card) 27'; Iniesta (yellow card) 37'; Neymar (yellow card) 47', (goal) 60', 85'; Suárez (yellow card) 47', (goal) 70' (pen.); Piqué (yellow card) 64'	Report	Mario (yellow card) 39'; Costa (yellow card) 69'; Bonera (yellow card) 72'	Stadium: Camp Nou; Attendance: 72,109; Referee: Carlos Clos Gómez

22 November 2015 12	Villarreal	1–1	Eibar	Villarreal
16:00 CET (UTC+1)	Costa (yellow card) 41', (goal) 85'; Soldado (yellow card) 44'; Mario (yellow card) 75'	Report	Enrich 27'; Keko (yellow card) 74' (yellow-red card) 76'; Escalante (yellow card) 79'; García (yellow card) 90+3'	Stadium: El Madrigal; Attendance: 15,788; Referee: Eduardo Prieto Iglesias

29 November 2015 13	Getafe	2–0	Villarreal	Getafe
12:00 CET (UTC+1)	Lafita (yellow card) 17', (goal) 21'; Cala (yellow card) 34'; Vázquez 51'; J. Rodríguez (yellow card) 65'; Lacen (yellow card) 78'	Report	Ruiz (yellow card) 5'; Bailly (yellow card) 85'	Stadium: Coliseum Alfonso Pérez; Attendance: 5,903; Referee: José González González

6 December 2015 14	Villarreal	2–1	Rayo Vallecano	Villarreal
16:00 CET (UTC+1)	Dos Santos (yellow card) 35'; Bakambu 69', 86'	Report	Baena (yellow card) 33'; Jozabed 41'; Castro (yellow card) 60'; Miku (yellow card) 80'; Quini (yellow card) 88'	Stadium: El Madrigal; Attendance: 16,101; Referee: Xavier Estrada Fernández

13 December 2015 15	Villarreal	1–0	Real Madrid	Villarreal
20:30 CET (UTC+1)	Soldado 8'; Bailly (yellow card) 72'; Suárez (yellow card) 90+2'	Report	Marcelo (yellow card) 31'; Ramos (yellow card) 66'	Stadium: El Madrigal; Attendance: 20,468; Referee: Alberto Undiano Mallenco

20 December 2015 16	Real Sociedad	0–2	Villarreal	San Sebastián
18:15 CET (UTC+1)	Canales (yellow card) 39'; I. Martínez (yellow card) 55'	Report	Suárez 27', 88'; Trigueros (yellow card) 73'	Stadium: Anoeta; Attendance: 21,949; Referee: Carlos del Cerro Grande

31 December 2015 17	Villarreal	1–0	Valencia	Villarreal
16:00 CET (UTC+1)	Bruno 64'; Soldado (yellow card) 68'	Report	Gomes (yellow card) 16'; Barragán (yellow card) 45'; Villalba (yellow card) 90+2'	Stadium: El Madrigal; Attendance: 18,526; Referee: Alfonso Álvarez Izquierdo

3 January 2016 18	Deportivo La Coruña	1–2	Villarreal	A Coruña
18:15 CET (UTC+1)	Luis Alberto (yellow card) 9', (goal) 48'; Arribas (yellow card) 25'	Report	Bruno 36', 90+5' (pen.), (yellow card) 39'; Dos Santos (yellow card) 43'; Navarro (yellow card) 90+5'	Stadium: Riazor; Attendance: 23,815; Referee: David Fernández Borbalán

10 January 2016 19	Villarreal	2–0	Sporting Gijón	Vilarreal
12:00 CET (UTC+1)	Bakambu 26', 51'; Bruno (yellow card) 53'; Ruiz (yellow card) 61'; Samu (yellow card) 79'; Soldado (yellow card) 87'	Report	Carmona (yellow card) 33'; Cases (yellow card) 87'	Stadium: El Madrigal; Attendance: 16,705; Referee: Jesús Gil Manzano

16 January 2016 20	Villarreal	0–0	Real Betis	Vilarreal
20:30 CET (UTC+1)	Ruiz (yellow card) 24'; Castillejo (yellow card) 90+4'	Report	Petros (yellow card) 79'	Stadium: El Madrigal; Attendance: 15,402; Referee: José González González

23 January 2016 21	Espanyol	2–2	Villarreal	Cornellà de Llobregat
18:15 CET (UTC+1)	Caicedo 4'; Jordán (yellow card) 35'; Gerard 40', (yellow card) 56' (yellow-red card) 89'; Salva (yellow card) 79'; Álvarez (yellow card) 89'	Report	Trigueros 24'; Costa (yellow card) 56'; Musacchio 88'	Stadium: Cornellà-El Prat; Attendance: 16,251; Referee: Pedro Pérez Montero

30 January 2016 22	Villarreal	1–0	Granada	Vilarreal
20:30 CET (UTC+1)	Costa (yellow card) 8'; Bruno 55' (pen.); Mario (yellow card) 85'; Castillejo (yellow card) 89'	Report	Rico (yellow card) 11'; Lombán (yellow card) 16'; Babin (yellow card) 54'	Stadium: El Madrigal; Referee: Carlos del Cerro Grande

6 February 2016 23	Athletic Bilbao	0–0	Villarreal	Bilbao
20:30 CET (UTC+1)	Williams (yellow card) 29' (yellow-red card) 90'; San José (yellow card) 41'; Lekue (yellow card) 60'; Merino (yellow card) 67'; Muniain (yellow card) 90'	Report	Costa (yellow card) 27'; Bakambu (yellow card) 40'; Soldado (yellow card) 75'; Ruiz (yellow card) 76'; Bonera (yellow card) 77' (yellow-red card) 90+4'	Stadium: San Mamés; Attendance: 41,101; Referee: Mario Melero López

13 February 2016 24	Villarreal	1–0	Málaga	Vilarreal
18:15 CET (UTC+1)	Soldado 18'; Trigueros (yellow card) 77'; Bakambu (yellow card) 90'	Report	Albentosa (yellow card) 34'	Stadium: El Madrigal; Attendance: 17,142; Referee: Iñaki Vicandi Garrido

21 February 2016 25	Atlético Madrid	0–0	Villarreal	Madrid
20:30 CET (UTC+1)	Gabi (yellow card) 69'; Filipe Luís (yellow card) 73'	Report	Castillejo (yellow card) 62'; Bailly (yellow card) 77'	Stadium: Vicente Calderón; Attendance: 45,323; Referee: Eduardo Prieto Iglesias

28 February 2016 26	Villarreal	3–0	Levante	Vilarreal
12:00 CET (UTC+1)	Baptistão 12'; Castillejo 30'; Adrián 48'	Report	Navarro (yellow card) 27' (yellow-red card) 56'; Lerma (yellow card) 39'; Verza (yellow card) 44'	Stadium: El Madrigal; Attendance: 15,783; Referee: Alejandro Hernández Hernández

2 March 2016 27	Celta Vigo	0–0	Villarreal	Vigo
20:00 CET (UTC+1)	Díaz (yellow card) 51'; Cabral (yellow card) 73'	Report	Matías Nahuel (yellow card) 54'; Suárez (yellow card) 72'; Bailly (yellow card) 73'; Mario (yellow card) 77'; Rukavina (yellow card) 86'	Stadium: Balaídos; Attendance: 15,376; Referee: Santiago Jaime Latre

5 March 2016 28	Villarreal	0–1	Las Palmas	Vilarreal
20:30 CET (UTC+1)	Soldado (yellow card) 31'	Report	García 30'; Lemos (yellow card) 53'; Montoro (yellow card) 60'	Stadium: El Madrigal; Attendance: 15,790; Referee: Carlos Clos Gómez

13 March 2016 29	Sevilla	4–2	Villarreal	Seville
16:00 CET (UTC+1)	Banega (yellow card) 6' (yellow-red card) 79'; Iborra 23'; Ruiz 51' (o.g.); Konoplyanka 65'; Krohn-Dehli (yellow card) 74'; Reyes 90+1'	Report	Bonera (yellow card) 25'; Bakambu 29', 37'	Stadium: Ramón Sánchez Pizjuán; Attendance: 35,069; Referee: Carlos Velasco Carballo

20 March 2016 30	Villarreal	2–2	Barcelona	Villarreal
16:00 CET (UTC+1)	Soldado (yellow card) 20'; Bruno (yellow card) 24'; Asenjo (yellow card) 40'; Ruiz (yellow card) 41'; Rukavina (yellow card) 43'; Bakambu 57'; Mathieu 63' (o.g.); Pina (yellow card) 78'; Mario (yellow card) 84'; Trigueros (yellow card) 85'	Report	Turan (yellow card) 13'; Piqué (yellow card) 16'; Rakitić 20'; Neymar 41' (pen.); Alba (yellow card) 53'; Mascherano (yellow card) 90+4'	Stadium: El Madrigal; Attendance: 24,398; Referee: José María Sánchez Martínez

3 April 2016 31	Eibar	1–2	Villarreal	Eibar
18:00 CEST (UTC+2)	Juncà (yellow card) 11'; Capa 22', (yellow card) 50'; Mauro (yellow card) 90'	Report	Rukavina (yellow card) 12'; Adrián 35'; Soldado 50'; Bakambu (yellow card) 71'; Pina (yellow card) 78'	Stadium: Ipurua; Attendance: 5,183; Referee: Carlos del Cerro Grande

10 April 2016 32	Villarreal	2–0	Getafe	Vilarreal
18:15 CEST (UTC+2)	Suárez 15'; Rukavina (yellow card) 26'; Bakambu 84'; Bruno (yellow card) 90'	Report	Cala (yellow card) 35'; Medrán (yellow card) 68'	Stadium: El Madrigal; Attendance: 17,570; Referee: Alberto Undiano Mallenco

17 April 2016 33	Rayo Vallecano	2–1	Villarreal	Madrid
18:15 CEST (UTC+2)	Guerra 7', (yellow card) 57'; Amaya (yellow card) 68'; Miku 81'	Report	Adrián 20'; Ruiz (yellow card) 57'; Marín (yellow card) 59'; Mario (yellow card) 72'; Matías Nahuel (yellow card) 80'	Stadium: Vallecas; Attendance: 12,628; Referee: Ignacio Iglesias Villanueva

20 April 2016 34	Real Madrid	3–0	Villarreal	Madrid
22:00 CEST (UTC+2)	Benzema 41'; Danilo (yellow card) 46'; Vázquez 69'; Modrić 76'; Casemiro (yellow card) 85'	Report	Trigueros (yellow card) 44'	Stadium: Santiago Bernabéu; Attendance: 62,678; Referee: Carlos Clos Gómez

24 April 2016 35	Villarreal	0–0	Real Sociedad	Villarreal
20:30 CEST (UTC+2)	Pina (yellow card) 32'; Mario (yellow card) 69'; Dos Santos (yellow card) 72'; Adrián (yellow card) 90'	Report	Vela (yellow card) 51'	Stadium: El Madrigal; Attendance: 17,215; Referee: David Fernández Borbalán

1 May 2016 36	Valencia	0–2	Villarreal	Valencia
20:30 CEST (UTC+2)	Fuego (yellow card) 42'	Report	Samu 16'; Musacchio (yellow card) 23'; Adrián 33'; Rodri (yellow card) 43'	Stadium: Mestalla; Attendance: 38,283; Referee: Carlos del Cerro Grande

8 May 2016 37	Villarreal	0–2	Deportivo La Coruña	Villarreal
17:00 CEST (UTC+2)	Bonera (yellow card) 10'; Trigueros (yellow card) 49'; Ruiz (yellow card) 51'	Report	Fajr 32'; Lucas 57'; Arribas (yellow card) 88'	Stadium: El Madrigal; Attendance: 12,843; Referee: Xavier Estrada Fernández

15 May 2016 38	Sporting Gijón	2–0	Villarreal	Gijón
19:30 CEST (UTC+2)	Jony 8'; Aït-Atmane (yellow card) 63'; Álvarez 79'	Report	Ruiz (yellow card) 49'; Mario (yellow card) 90'	Stadium: El Molinón; Attendance: 27,295; Referee: Alberto Undiano Mallenco

=== Copa del Rey ===
==== Round of 32 ====
3 December 2015 First leg	Huesca	3–2	Villarreal	Huesca
21:00 CET (UTC+1)	L. Fernández 3'; Mérida 53' (pen.); Machís 75'; Carlos David (yellow card) 90+2'; Cristian (red card) 90+2'; López (yellow card) 90+3'	Summary	Jokić (yellow card) 33'; Bailly (yellow card) 36'; Matías Nahuel 51', (yellow card) 90+3'; Bakambu 58'	Stadium: El Alcoraz; Attendance: 5,000; Referee: Carlos del Cerro Grande

17 December 2015 Second leg	Villarreal	2–0 (4–3 agg.)	Huesca	Vilarreal
21:00 CET (UTC+1)	Trigueros 28'; Soldado 78'	Summary	Morillas (yellow card) 63'; Carlos David (yellow card) 84'; Aythami (yellow card) 90+2'	Stadium: El Madrigal; Referee: Ricardo de Burgos Bengoetxea

==== Round of 16 ====
6 January 2016 First leg	Athletic Bilbao	3–2	Villarreal	Bilbao
12:00 CET (UTC+1)	Williams 54'; Aduriz 68'; Laporte 81'	Report	Baptistão 16'; Samu 38'	Stadium: San Mamés; Referee: Carlos Clos Gómez

13 January 2016 Second leg	Villarreal	0–1 (2–4 agg.)	Athletic Bilbao	Vilarreal
20:30 CET (UTC+1)		Report	Williams 21'	Stadium: El Madrigal; Referee: Carlos Velasco Carballo

=== UEFA Europa League ===
==== Group stage ====
Pos	Team	Pld	W	D	L	GF	GA	GD	Pts	Qualification
1	(Austria) Rapid Wien	6	5	0	1	10	6	+4	15	Advance to knockout phase
2	(Spain) Villarreal	6	4	1	1	12	6	+6	13	Advance to knockout phase
3	(Czech Republic) Viktoria Plzeň	6	1	1	4	8	10	−2	4	
4	(Belarus) Dinamo Minsk	6	1	0	5	3	11	−8	3	

Source: Soccerway
Rules for classification: Group stage tiebreakers

17 September 2015 1	Rapid Wien (Austria)	2–1	(Spain) Villarreal	Vienna, Austria
19:00 CEST (UTC+2)	Schwab 50'; S. Hofmann 53' (pen.)	Report	Baptistão 45'	Stadium: Ernst-Happel-Stadion; Attendance: 36,200; Referee: Stefan Johannesson (Sweden)

1 October 2015 2	Villarreal (Spain)	1–0	(Czech Republic) Viktoria Plzeň	Villarreal, Spain
21:05 CEST (UTC+2)	Baptistão 54'	Report		Stadium: El Madrigal; Attendance: 17,481; Referee: Serdar Gözübüyük (Netherlands)

22 October 2015 3	Villarreal (Spain)	4–0	(Belarus) Dinamo Minsk	Villarreal, Spain
21:05 CEST (UTC+2)	Bakambu 17', 32'; Soldado 61'; Bailly 71'	Report		Stadium: El Madrigal; Attendance: 14,025; Referee: Serdar Gözübüyük (Netherlands)

5 November 2015 4	Dinamo Minsk (Belarus)	1–2	(Spain) Villarreal	Barysaw, Belarus
19:00 CET (UTC+1)	Vitus 69'	Report	Soldado 72' (pen.); Palitsevich 86' (o.g.)	Stadium: Borisov Arena; Attendance: 4,959; Referee: John Beaton (Scotland)

26 November 2015 5	Villarreal (Spain)	1–0	(Austria) Rapid Wien	Villarreal, Spain
21:05 CET (UTC+1)	Soriano 78'	Report		Stadium: El Madrigal; Attendance: 14,760; Referee: Paweł Raczkowski (Poland)

10 December 2015 6	Viktoria Plzeň (Czech Republic)	3–3	(Spain) Villarreal	Plzeň, Czech Republic
19:00 CET (UTC+1)	Kolář 8' (pen.); Kovařík 65'; Hořava 90'	Report	Bakambu 40'; Dos Santos 62'; Soriano 90+4'	Stadium: Doosan Arena; Attendance: 10,071; Referee: Tony Chapron (France)

==== Knockout phase ====
===== Round of 32 =====
18 February 2016 First leg	Villarreal (Spain)	1–0	(Italy) Napoli	Villarreal, Spain
19:00 CET (UTC+1)	Suárez 82'; Musacchio (yellow card) 86'; Soldado (yellow card) 90'	Report	Valdifiori (yellow card) 38'; Callejón (yellow card) 67'; Insigne (yellow card) 83'	Stadium: El Madrigal; Attendance: 17,686; Referee: Bas Nijhuis (Netherlands)

25 February 2016 Second leg	Napoli (Italy)	1–1 (1–2 agg.)	(Spain) Villarreal	Naples, Italy
21:05 CET (UTC+1)	Hamšík 17', (yellow card) 25'; López (yellow card) 33'; Jorginho (yellow card) 83'	Report	Rukavina (yellow card) 25'; Bruno (yellow card) 36'; Pina 59'	Stadium: Stadio San Paolo; Attendance: 23,928; Referee: Deniz Aytekin (Germany)

===== Round of 16 =====
10 March 2016 First leg	Villarreal (Spain)	2–0	(Germany) Bayer Leverkusen	Villarreal, Spain
21:05 CET (UTC+1)	Bakambu 4', 56'; Trigueros (yellow card) 71'	Report	Tah (yellow card) 14'; Hernández (yellow card) 48'; Jedvaj (yellow card) 76' (yellow-red card) 90+5'	Stadium: El Madrigal; Attendance: 16,211; Referee: Gianluca Rocchi (Italy)

17 March 2016 Second leg	Bayer Leverkusen (Germany)	0–0 (0–2 agg.)	(Spain) Villarreal	Leverkusen, Germany
19:00 CET (UTC+1)	Mehmedi (yellow card) 42'; Papadopoulos (yellow card) 73'; Bellarabi (yellow card) 79'	Report	Rukavina (yellow card) 60'; Bakambu (yellow card) 80'	Stadium: BayArena; Attendance: 23,409; Referee: Willie Collum (Scotland)

===== Quarter-finals =====
7 April 2016 First leg	Villarreal (Spain)	2–1	(Czech Republic) Sparta Prague	Villarreal, Spain
21:05 CEST (UTC+2)	Bakambu 3', 63'; Costa (yellow card) 40'	Report	Brabec (yellow card) 31', (goal) 45+4'; Matějovský (yellow card) 41'; Nhamoinesu (yellow card) 43'	Stadium: El Madrigal; Attendance: 15,803; Referee: Ovidiu Hațegan (Romania)

14 April 2016 Second leg	Sparta Prague (Czech Republic)	2–4 (3–6 agg.)	(Spain) Villarreal	Prague, Czech Republic
21:05 CEST (UTC+2)	Krejčí (yellow card) 27', (goal) 71'; Frýdek (yellow card) 41'; Juliš (yellow card) 60'; Kováč (yellow card) 63'; Dočkal 65'; Konaté (yellow card) 77'; Lafata (yellow card) 90+1'	Report	Bakambu 5', 49'; Soldado (yellow card) 35'; Castillejo 43', (yellow card) 78'; Lafata 45+1' (o.g.)	Stadium: Generali Arena; Attendance: 18,201; Referee: Martin Atkinson (England)

===== Semi-finals =====
28 April 2016 First leg	Villarreal (Spain)	1–0	(England) Liverpool	Villarreal, Spain
21:05 CEST (UTC+2)	Costa (yellow card) 60'; Adrián 90+2'	Report		Stadium: El Madrigal; Attendance: 21,606; Referee: Damir Skomina (Slovenia)

5 May 2016 Second leg	Liverpool (England)	3–0 (3–1 agg.)	(Spain) Villarreal	Liverpool, England
21:05 CEST (UTC+2)	Bruno 7' (o.g.); Clyne (yellow card) 35'; Sturridge 63'; Lallana 81'	UEFA Report	Ruiz (yellow card) 30' (yellow-red card) 71'; Soldado (yellow card) 40'; Suárez (yellow card) 90+4'	Stadium: Anfield; Attendance: 43,074; Referee: Viktor Kassai (Hungary)

== Statistics ==
=== Appearances and goals ===
Last updated on 15 May 2016

No.	Pos	Nat	Player	Total		La Liga		Copa del Rey		Europa League	
No.	Pos	Nat	Player	Apps	Goals	Apps	Goals	Apps	Goals	Apps	Goals
Goalkeepers
1	GK	(Spain) ESP	Sergio Asenjo	7	0	4	0	0	0	3	0
13	GK	(France) FRA	Alphonse Areola	37	0	32	0	0	0	5	0
25	GK	(Argentina) ARG	Mariano Barbosa	12	0	2	0	4	0	6	0
Defenders
2	DF	(Spain) ESP	Mario Gaspar	44	2	32+1	2	0+1	0	10	0
5	DF	(Argentina) ARG	Mateo Musacchio	21	1	12+1	1	3	0	4+1	0
6	DF	(Spain) ESP	Víctor Ruiz	51	0	32+3	0	1+1	0	14	0
11	DF	(Spain) ESP	Jaume Costa	27	1	17+1	1	0+1	0	7+1	0
22	DF	(Serbia) SRB	Antonio Rukavina	31	0	14+4	0	3	0	10	0
23	DF	(Italy) ITA	Daniele Bonera	16	0	10+4	0	0	0	1+1	0
24	DF	(Ivory Coast) CIV	Eric Bailly	35	1	25	0	3	0	7	1
27	DF	(Spain) ESP	Adrián Marín	16	0	10+1	0	3	0	0+2	0
44	DF	(Spain) ESP	Pablo Íñiguez	1	0	0	0	1	0	0	0
48	DF	(Spain) ESP	Miguelón	1	0	0	0	1	0	0	0
Midfielders
4	MF	(Spain) ESP	Tomás Pina	36	1	19+8	0	2	0	6+1	1
7	MF	(Spain) ESP	Samu	26	3	7+9	2	4	1	4+2	0
8	MF	(Mexico) MEX	Jonathan dos Santos	38	1	20+6	0	1+1	0	7+3	1
14	MF	(Spain) ESP	Manu Trigueros	45	3	24+7	2	2	1	6+6	0
18	MF	(Spain) ESP	Denis Suárez	48	5	25+8	4	0+2	0	11+2	1
19	MF	(Spain) ESP	Samu Castillejo	45	2	19+9	1	4	0	8+5	1
21	MF	(Spain) ESP	Bruno	45	7	28+3	5	0+2	0	12	2
26	MF	(Spain) ESP	Matías Nahuel	30	1	11+9	0	4	1	2+4	0
28	MF	(Spain) ESP	Alfonso Pedraza	3	0	2	0	0	0	0+1	0
29	MF	(Spain) ESP	Rodri	6	0	1+2	0	3	0	0	0
Forwards
9	FW	(Spain) ESP	Roberto Soldado	44	8	27+1	5	0+3	1	12+1	2
10	FW	(Brazil) BRA	Léo Baptistão	34	6	12+14	3	2	1	3+3	2
17	FW	(Democratic Republic of the Congo) COD	Cédric Bakambu	50	22	21+13	12	2+1	1	11+2	9
20	FW	(Spain) ESP	Adrián	23	5	10+6	4	0	0	1+6	1
Players who have made an appearance or had a squad number this season but have left the club
3	DF	(Slovenia) SLO	Bojan Jokić	7	0	2	0	1	0	4	0

== See also ==
2015–16 La Liga
