= Manu Trigueros =

Spanish footballer (born 1991)

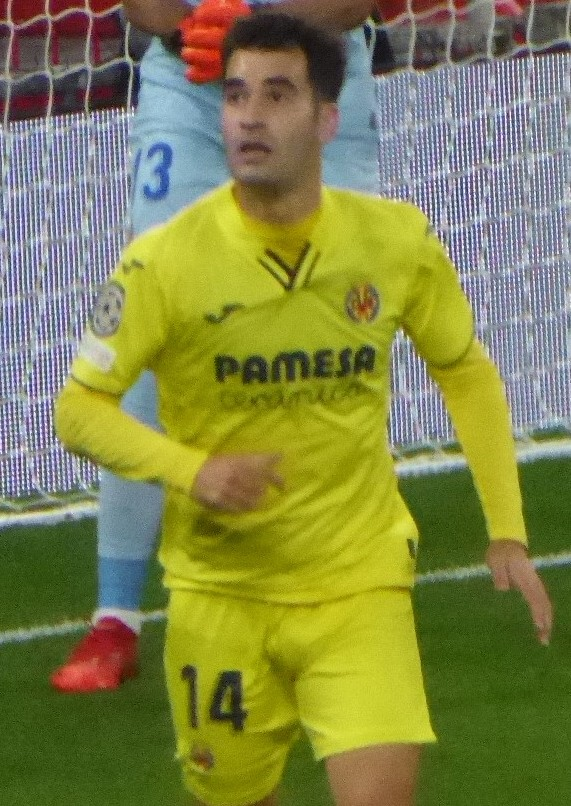
- Trigueros with Villarreal in 2021

Personal information
- Full name: Manuel Trigueros Muñoz
- Date of birth: 17 October 1991 (age 35)
- Place of birth: Talavera de la Reina, Spain
- Height: 1.78 m (5 ft 10 in)
- Position: Midfielder

Youth career
- Talavera
- 2007–2008: Barcelona
- 2008–2010: Murcia

Senior career*
Years	Team	Apps	(Gls)
2009–2010	Murcia B	10	(1)
2010–2011	Villarreal C	36	(13)
2011–2012	Villarreal B	26	(3)
2012–2024	Villarreal	366	(25)
2024–2026	Granada	68	(3)
Total		506	(45)
- * Club domestic league appearances and goals

Manuel Trigueros Muñoz (born 17 October 1991) is a Spanish former professional footballer who played as a midfielder.

He spent the majority of his career with Villarreal, making a club record of 477 total appearances and winning the UEFA Europa League in 2021.

== Club career ==
=== Early career ===
Born in Talavera de la Reina, Toledo, Castilla-La Mancha, Trigueros began playing football for his local team Talavera CF. While playing in a nationwide tournament for his autonomous community, he was courted by several leading clubs, and chose FC Barcelona; he struggled to be picked in his only year as an under-18 in La Masia. He then moved to Real Murcia CF, making his senior debut with the reserves and being released in June 2010 following the main squad's relegation from Segunda División.

=== Villarreal ===
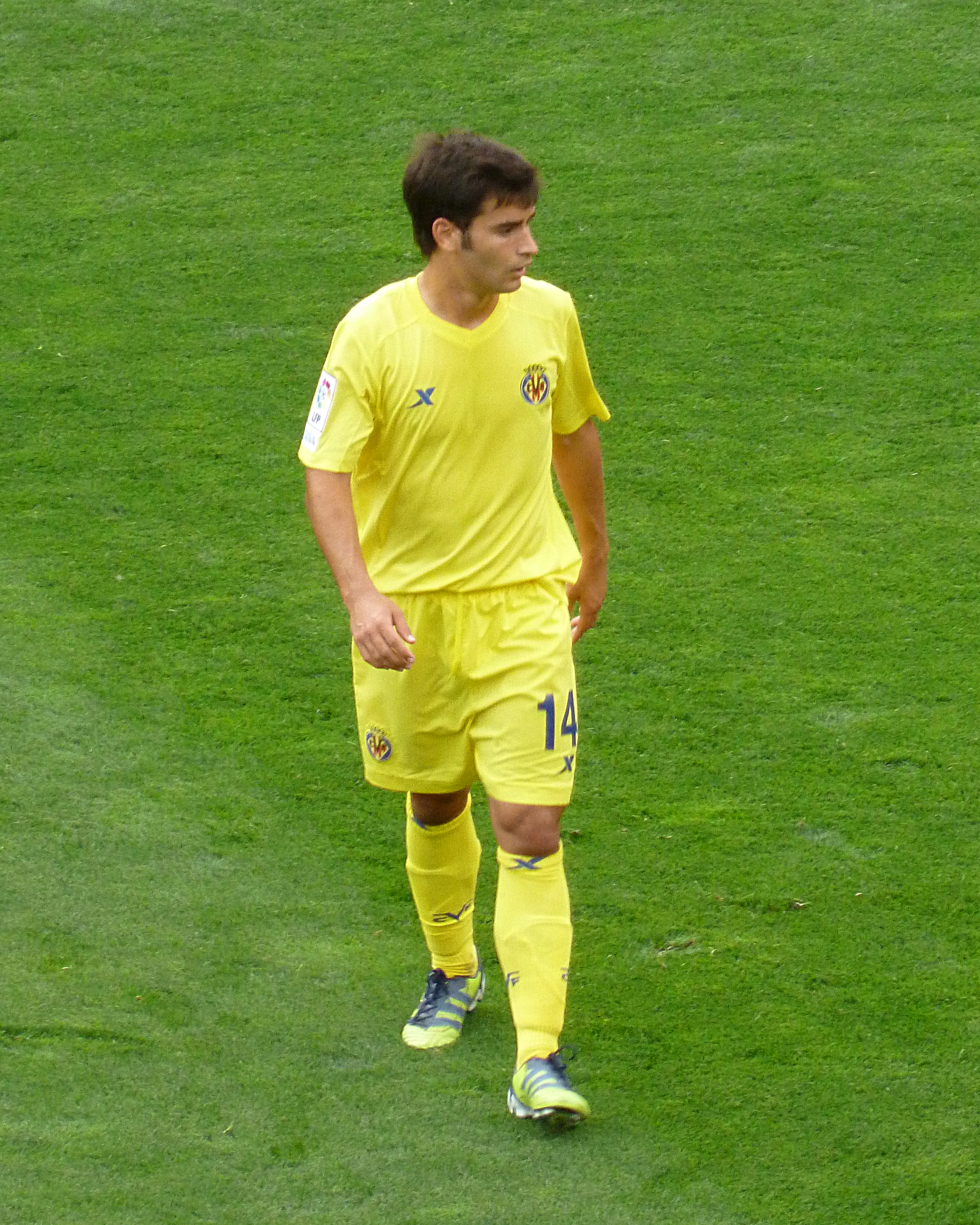
Trigueros playing for Villarreal B in 2012

Subsequently, Trigueros signed for Villarreal CF, being assigned to the C team. He made his official debut with Villarreal B on 4 June 2011, playing 30 minutes as a substitute for Fofo in a 2–1 away loss against Real Betis on the last day of the second-tier season. On 11 February 2012 he scored his first goal in a 3–1 defeat at CE Sabadell FC, being relatively played during the season but suffering relegation – even though the side finished in 12th position – as the first team had also dropped down a level in La Liga.

In June 2012, Trigueros was definitely promoted to the main squad. He contributed 36 games and three goals as the Yellow Submarine won instant promotion; his 15th appearance activated a clause that paid €100,000 to Murcia.

Trigueros made his maiden appearance in the top flight on 19 August 2013, coming on as a 53rd-minute substitute for Tomás Pina in 3–2 away victory over UD Almería. As a starter, he scored his first goal in the competition, his team's second in the 3–1 home defeat of CA Osasuna on 3 February 2014. That October, his contract was extended from 2017 to 2019; in November 2016, a new deal tied him to Villarreal until 2022.

On 21 May 2017, Trigueros scored in a 3–1 win at local rivals Valencia CF on the last day of the season, securing fifth place and qualification for the UEFA Europa League. He netted his first in that continental competition on 19 October, as the team fought back for a 2–2 group stage draw with SK Slavia Prague at the Estadio de la Cerámica. On 23 December, in another derby at Mestalla, he was sent off for the first time in his career in a 1–0 victory.

Trigueros reached 300 matches for the club on 10 November 2019, in a 3–1 away loss against RCD Mallorca. In March 2021, he entered Villarreal's top three appearance makers, overtaking Marcos Senna's 363 and trailing only his contemporaries Bruno Soriano and Mario Gaspar. He played 14 times that season in their victorious Europa League campaign (54 in all competitions), scoring the opening goal of a 2–1 semi-final win over Arsenal on 29 April.

In November 2021, Trigueros' link was lengthened to 2025, with him remaining a key part of manager Unai Emery's plans. On 15 December, he made his 400th appearance in a 7–1 rout of Atlético Sanluqueño CF in the second round of the Copa del Rey, trailing Bruno's overall record by just 25. He took the record on 8 September 2022 in a 4–3 UEFA Europa Conference League group victory at home to Lech Poznań.

In 2023–24, Trigueros was more often a substitute, as the managerial hotseat revolved between Quique Setién, Pacheta and Marcelino García Toral. On 2 November, playing as an attacking midfielder for the second of those coaches, he scored his first career hat-trick in a 5–0 win away to sixth-tier Chiclana CF in the opening round of the cup.

Trigueros finished his spell with 477 matches, leaving on 8 August 2024.

=== Granada ===
Hours after leaving Villarreal, Trigueros joined second-division side Granada CF on a two-year contract. On 29 May 2026, the 34-year-old announced that he would retire at the end of the season, making his last appearance two days later against Sporting de Gijón.

== Personal life ==
Both of Trigueros' parents were teachers, and he graduated in Primary Education in 2017. While some sources erroneously named his alma mater as Universidad CEU San Pablo, it was actually the Castellón de la Plana campus of a linked establishment, CEU Cardinal Herrera University.

Trigueros' father, also named Manuel, played in the second tier for Granada. His cousin Pablo, a defender, was also active at that level for SD Ponferradina.

== Career statistics ==
Appearances and goals by club, season and competition
Club	Season	League			Copa del Rey		Europe		Other		Total	
Club	Season	Division	Apps	Goals	Apps	Goals	Apps	Goals	Apps	Goals	Apps	Goals
Murcia B	2008–09	Segunda División B	2	0	—		—		—		2	0
Murcia B	2009–10	Segunda División B	8	1	—		—		—		8	1
Murcia B	Total		10	1	—		—		—		10	1
Villarreal C	2010–11	Tercera División	25	7	—		—		—		25	7
Villarreal C	2011–12	Tercera División	11	6	—		—		—		11	6
Villarreal C	Total		36	13	—		—		—		36	13
Villarreal B	2010–11	Segunda División	1	0	—		—		—		1	0
Villarreal B	2011–12	Segunda División	25	3	—		—		—		25	3
Villarreal B	Total		26	3	—		—		—		26	3
Villarreal	2012–13	Segunda División	36	3	1	0	—		—		37	3
Villarreal	2013–14	La Liga	35	2	3	0	—		—		38	2
Villarreal	2014–15	La Liga	33	1	7	2	10 (Note: Appearances in UEFA Europa League)	0	—		50	3
Villarreal	2015–16	La Liga	31	2	2	1	12	0	—		45	3
Villarreal	2016–17	La Liga	37	5	3	1	5 (Note: Two appearances in UEFA Champions League, three appearances and one goal in UEFA Europa League)	1	—		45	7
Villarreal	2017–18	La Liga	34	3	3	0	7	1	—		44	4
Villarreal	2018–19	La Liga	24	0	3	0	7	0	—		34	0
Villarreal	2019–20	La Liga	29	2	2	0	—		—		31	2
Villarreal	2020–21	La Liga	35	1	5	0	14	1	—		54	2
Villarreal	2021–22	La Liga	35	6	2	1	9 (Note: Appearances in UEFA Champions League)	1	1 (Note: Appearance in UEFA Super Cup)	0	47	8
Villarreal	2022–23	La Liga	23	0	3	0	4 (Note: Appearances in UEFA Europa Conference League)	1	—		30	1
Villarreal	2023–24	La Liga	14	0	3	3	5	0	—		22	3
Villarreal	Total		366	25	37	8	73	5	1	0	477	38
Granada	2024–25	Segunda División	36	3	3	0	—		—		39	3
Granada	2025–26	Segunda División	32	0	3	0	—		—		35	0
Granada	Total		68	3	6	0	—		—		74	3
Career total			506	45	43	8	73	5	1	0	623	58

== Honours ==
Villarreal

- UEFA Europa League: 2020–21

Individual

- UEFA La Liga Team of the Season: 2016–17
