= Juan Carlos (footballer, born 1987) =

Spanish footballer

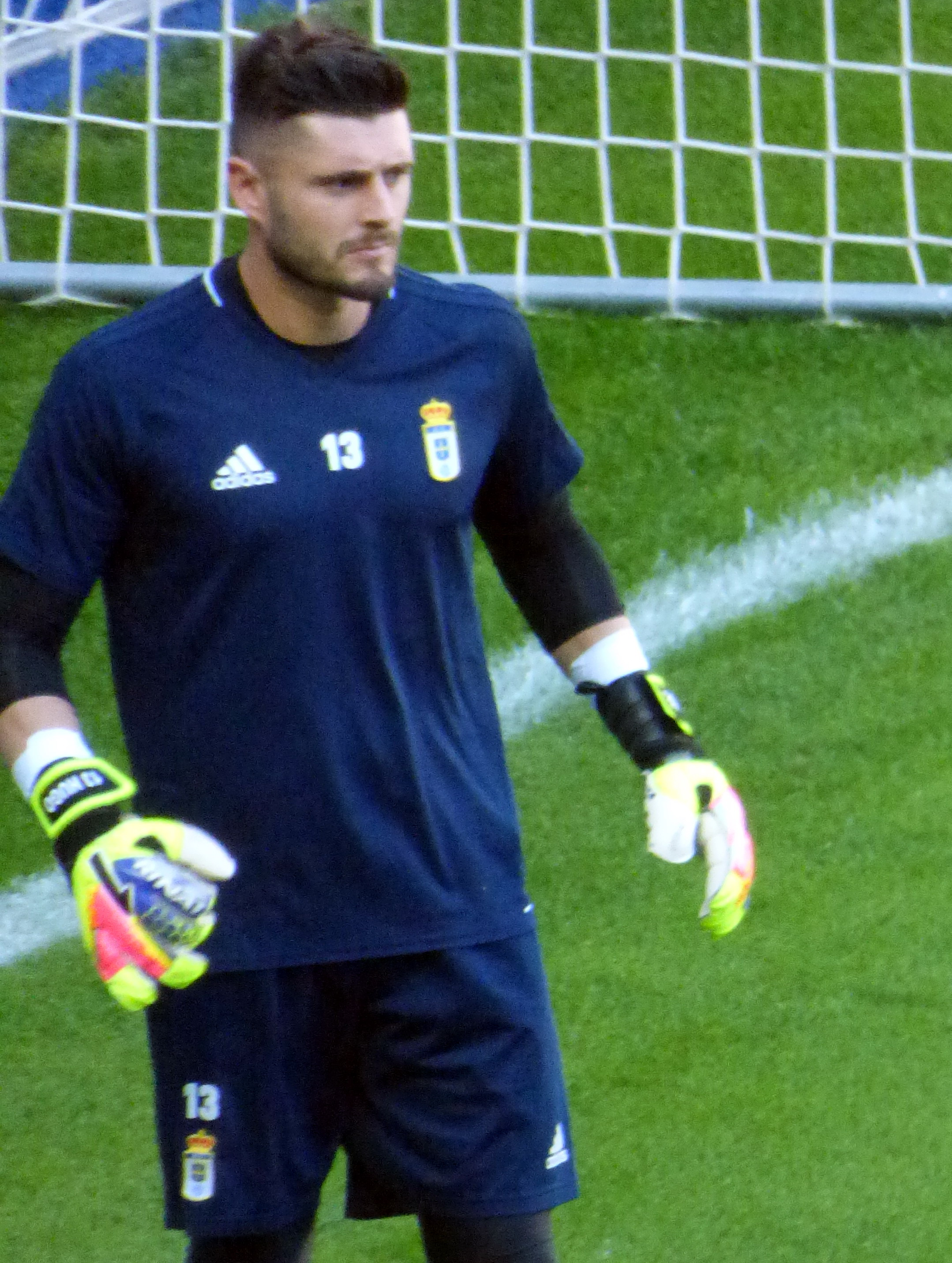
- Juan Carlos with Oviedo in 2017

Personal information
- Full name: Juan Carlos Sánchez Martínez
- Date of birth: 27 July 1987 (age 39)
- Place of birth: Calvià, Spain
- Height: 1.82 m (6 ft 0 in)
- Position: Goalkeeper

Youth career
- Playas Calvià
- Villarreal

Senior career*
Years	Team	Apps	(Gls)
2005–2010	Villarreal B	183	(0)
2008–2015	Villarreal	41	(0)
2011–2012	→ Elche (loan)	38	(0)
2015–2016	Albacete	34	(0)
2016–2018	Oviedo	57	(0)
2018–2020	Numancia	39	(0)
2020–2021	Atlético Baleares	8	(0)
2021–2022	Poblense	30	(0)
Total		430	(0)
- * Club domestic league appearances and goals as of 19:33, 21 January 2023 (UTC)

Juan Carlos Sánchez Martínez (born 27 July 1987), known as Juan Carlos, is a Spanish professional footballer who plays as a goalkeeper.

== Club career ==
Born in Calvià, Balearic Islands, Juan Carlos was a product of Villarreal CF's youth academy. He made his debut for the first team on 13 April 2008 in a 1–0 loss away loss against UD Almería, subbing in for sent off Diego López in the 18th minute. Previously, he was the undisputed starter for the reserves for three full seasons, starting in all the games he appeared in, including in 2008–09 as they promoted to Segunda División for the first time ever.

Juan Carlos was third choice behind López and Sebastián Viera during the 2007–08 and 2008–09 campaigns in La Liga. In 2010–11 he was promoted to backup, but still did not manage to play any league matches.

On 12 July 2011, Juan Carlos was loaned to Valencian Community neighbours Elche CF in the second tier. He severed his ties with Villarreal on 9 July 2015, and joined Albacete Balompié on a two-year contract the following day.

On 8 July 2016, after Alba's relegation, Juan Carlos signed a two-year deal with Real Oviedo also in division two. Midway through the 2017–18 season he lost his starting spot to Alfonso Herrero, and left the club as his contract expired.

Juan Carlos agreed to a two-year contract at CD Numancia on 23 July 2018, still in the second division. On 30 July 2020, he moved to CD Atlético Baleares of Segunda División B as a free agent.

== Career statistics ==
=== Club ===
Appearances and goals by club, season and competition
Club	Season	League			Cup		Continental		Other		Total	
Club	Season	Division	Apps	Goals	Apps	Goals	Apps	Goals	Apps	Goals	Apps	Goals
Villarreal	2004–05	La Liga	0	0	0	0	0	0	—		0	0
Villarreal	2005–06	La Liga	0	0	0	0	0	0	—		0	0
Villarreal	2006–07	La Liga	0	0	0	0	0	0	—		0	0
Villarreal	2007–08	La Liga	1	0	0	0	0	0	—		1	0
Villarreal	2008–09	La Liga	0	0	0	0	0	0	—		0	0
Villarreal	2010–11	La Liga	0	0	5	0	1	0	—		6	0
Villarreal	2012–13	Segunda División	32	0	0	0	—		—		32	0
Villarreal	2013–14	La Liga	3	0	4	0	—		—		7	0
Villarreal	2014–15	La Liga	5	0	2	0	4	0	—		11	0
Villarreal	Total		41	0	9	0	5	0	—		55	0
Elche (loan)	2011–12	Segunda División	38	0	0	0	—		—		38	0
Albacete	2015–16	Segunda División	34	0	0	0	—		—		34	0
Oviedo	2016–17	Segunda División	42	0	0	0	—		—		42	0
Oviedo	2017–18	Segunda División	15	0	0	0	—		—		15	0
Oviedo	Total		57	0	0	0	—		—		57	0
Numancia	2018–19	Segunda División	39	0	0	0	—		—		39	0
Numancia	2019–20	Segunda División	0	0	1	0	—		—		1	0
Numancia	Total		39	0	1	0	—		—		40	0
Atlético Baleares	2020–21	Segunda División B	8	0	0	0	—		—		8	0
Poblense	2021–22	Tercera División RFEF	28	0	—		—		2	0	30	0
Career total			245	0	10	0	5	0	2	0	262	0
