= Joan Truyols =

Spanish footballer

Personal information
- Full name: Joan Guillem Truyols Mascaró
- Date of birth: 11 November 1989 (age 36)
- Place of birth: Palma, Spain
- Height: 1.79 m (5 ft 10 in)
- Position: Centre-back

Team information
- Current team: Badajoz
- Number: 22

Youth career
- Mallorca

Senior career*
| Years | Team | Apps | (Gls) |
| 2009–2010 | Mallorca B | 29 | (3) |
| 2010–2012 | Villarreal B | 31 | (2) |
| 2012–2013 | Villarreal | 3 | (0) |
| 2013–2014 | Murcia | 33 | (1) |
| 2014–2016 | Mallorca | 30 | (0) |
| 2016–2021 | AEK Larnaca | 101 | (9) |
| 2021– | Badajoz | 19 | (1) |
- * Club domestic league appearances and goals as of 01:45, 5 July 2022 (UTC)

Joan Guillem Truyols Mascaró (born 11 November 1989) is a Spanish footballer who plays as a central defender for CD Badajoz.

== Club career ==
Born in Palma de Mallorca, Balearic Islands, Truyols graduated from the youth academy of RCD Mallorca and made his debut with their reserves in the 2009–10 season, in Segunda División B. In February 2010, he was called to the first team by manager Gregorio Manzano for a La Liga match against CD Tenerife, as an injury replacement.

On 4 May 2010, Truyols joined Segunda División side Villarreal CF B on a free transfer. He played his first game as a professional on 9 October, featuring the entire 3–0 away loss to Rayo Vallecano.

Truyols scored his first goal for Villarreal B's on 7 April 2012, helping the hosts defeat Elche CF 2–0. Ahead of the following campaign, he was promoted to the main squad who also competed in the second tier. After being rarely used he was released, with the latter having achieved promotion.

On 19 July 2013, Truyols signed for Real Murcia. One year later, he returned to Mallorca.

On 8 July 2016, Truyols moved abroad and joined Cypriot First Division club AEK Larnaca FC on a two-year contract. He returned to his country five years and 139 competitive appearances later, agreeing to a deal at CD Badajoz of the Primera División RFEF.

== Career statistics ==
As of match played on 2 October 2021

Club statistics
| Club | Season | League | | | Cup | | Continental | | Other | | Total | |
| Club | Season | Division | Apps | Goals | Apps | Goals | Apps | Goals | Apps | Goals | Apps | Goals |
|---|---|---|---|---|---|---|---|---|---|---|---|---|
| Mallorca B | 2009–10 | Segunda División B | 29 | 3 | — | | — | | — | | 29 | 3 |
| Villarreal B | 2010–11 | Segunda División | 12 | 0 | 0 | 0 | — | | — | | 12 | 0 |
| Villarreal B | 2011–12 | Segunda División | 19 | 2 | 0 | 0 | — | | — | | 19 | 2 |
| Villarreal B | Total | | 31 | 2 | 0 | 0 | — | | — | | 31 | 2 |
| Villarreal | 2012–13 | Segunda División | 3 | 0 | 1 | 0 | — | | — | | 4 | 0 |
| Murcia | 2013–14 | Segunda División | 33 | 1 | 1 | 0 | — | | 1 (Note: Appearances in Promotion Play-offs) | 0 | 35 | 1 |
| Mallorca | 2014–15 | Segunda División | 21 | 0 | 0 | 0 | — | | — | | 21 | 0 |
| Mallorca | 2015–16 | Segunda División | 9 | 0 | 1 | 0 | — | | — | | 10 | 0 |
| Mallorca | Total | | 30 | 0 | 1 | 0 | — | | — | | 31 | 0 |
| AEK Larnaca | 2016–17 | Cypriot First Division | 15 | 2 | 3 | 1 | 1 (Note: Appearances in UEFA Europa League) | 0 | — | | 19 | 3 |
| AEK Larnaca | 2017–18 | Cypriot First Division | 15 | 0 | 3 | 0 | 7 | 1 | — | | 25 | 1 |
| AEK Larnaca | 2018–19 | Cypriot First Division | 28 | 4 | 3 | 0 | 10 | 1 | 1 (Note: Appearance in Cypriot Super Cup) | 0 | 40 | 5 |
| AEK Larnaca | 2019–20 | Cypriot First Division | 20 | 2 | 3 | 0 | 6 | 0 | — | | 29 | 2 |
| AEK Larnaca | 2020–21 | Cypriot First Division | 22 | 1 | 1 | 0 | — | | — | | 23 | 1 |
| AEK Larnaca | 2021–22 | Cypriot First Division | 1 | 0 | — | | — | | — | | 1 | 0 |
| AEK Larnaca | Total | | 101 | 9 | 13 | 1 | 24 | 2 | 1 | 0 | 137 | 12 |
| Badajoz | 2021–22 | Primera División RFEF | 3 | 0 | 0 | 0 | — | | — | | 3 | 0 |
| Career total | | | 200 | 15 | 16 | 1 | 24 | 2 | 2 | 0 | 242 | 18 |

== Honours ==
AEK Larnaca

- Cypriot Cup: 2017–18
- Cypriot Super Cup: 2018
