= Mario Gaspar =

Spanish footballer (born 1990)

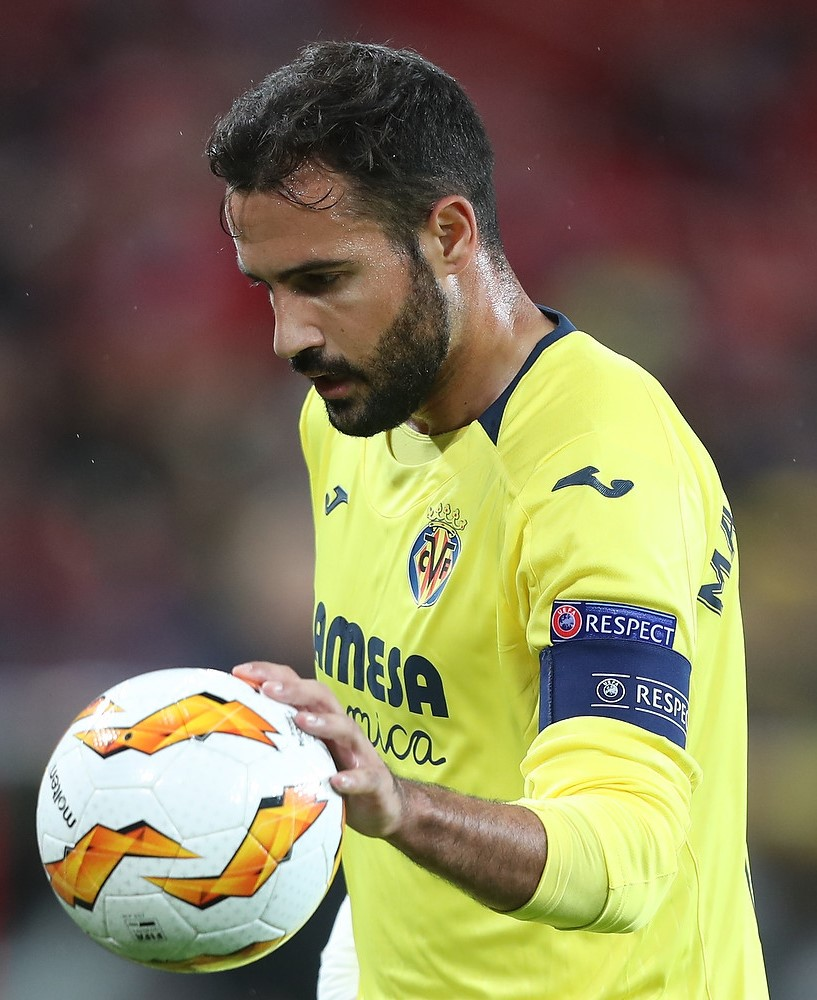
- Mario Gaspar with Villarreal in 2018

Personal information
- Full name: Mario Gaspar Pérez Martínez
- Date of birth: 24 November 1990 (age 35)
- Place of birth: Novelda, Spain
- Height: 1.82 m (6 ft 0 in)
- Position: Right-back

Youth career
- Albacete
- 2007: Villarreal

Senior career*
Years	Team	Apps	(Gls)
2007–2008	Villarreal C	15	(1)
2008–2011	Villarreal B	79	(0)
2009–2022	Villarreal	337	(10)
2022–2023	Watford	31	(0)
2023–2025	Elche	51	(3)
Total		513	(14)

International career
2008–2009	Spain U19	13	(2)
2009	Spain U20	1	(0)
2011	Spain U21	2	(0)
2015–2016	Spain	3	(2)
- * Club domestic league appearances and goals

Mario Gaspar Pérez Martínez (Spanish pronunciation: [ˈmaɾjo ɣasˈpaɾ ˈpeɾeθ maɾˈtineθ]; (Note: In isolation, Gaspar is pronounced [ɡasˈpaɾ].) born 24 November 1990) is a Spanish former professional footballer who played as a right-back.

He spent 15 years of his career at Villarreal, making 424 official appearances and winning the 2020–21 UEFA Europa League. In July 2022, he signed with Watford.

Mario Gaspar played his first match with Spain in 2015, scoring on his debut.

== Club career ==
=== Villarreal ===
Born in Novelda, Alicante, Valencian Community, Mario Gaspar finished his development at Villarreal CF after arriving from Albacete Balompié. On 15 March 2009, aged just 18, he made his first-team – and La Liga – debut, in a game against Atlético Madrid: he replaced Giuseppe Rossi with roughly 25 minutes to play, with the score at 2–1, but the Yellow Submarine eventually lost 3–2 away.

Mario Gaspar spent the entire 2009–10 season with the reserves. He started in all 31 games he appeared in, as they easily retained their newly-found Segunda División status.

Midway through the following campaign, Mario Gaspar was definitely promoted to the main squad following Ángel López's severe knee injury, also making the starting XI. On 16 January 2011, in his first start, he played the full 90 minutes in a 4–2 home win over CA Osasuna, finishing with 22 appearances. He scored his first competitive goal on 1 May 2012, opening the 3–2 victory at Sporting de Gijón towards the end of a season which finished with relegation. In May 2014, with a year remaining on his contract, it was extended for a further four.

Mario Gaspar scored his first goal in European competition on 21 August 2014, concluding a 3–0 away defeat of FC Astana in the first leg of their UEFA Europa League play-off (7–0 aggregate). In January 2017, he signed a new deal to last until 2023.

On 18 March 2018, Mario Gaspar played his 300th official match for Villarreal, in a 2–1 win at Atlético; only Cani, Marcos Senna and teammate Bruno Soriano had reached that figure before for the club. He filled in as captain during the lengthy injuries of the last of those players, and on 21 April 2021 with a 2–1 away loss to Deportivo Alavés he joined him at 400 matches.

In 2021–22, still under manager Unai Emery, Mario Gaspar was kept out of the team by both Serge Aurier and Juan Foyth.

=== Watford ===
On 29 July 2022, Mario Gaspar signed for EFL Championship club Watford. He made his league debut on 8 August, a 77th-minute substitute for Hassane Kamara in the 1–1 draw at West Bromwich Albion.

Mario Gaspar was released in July 2023, having reached an agreement to cancel his contract.

=== Elche ===
On 31 July 2023, Mario Gaspar returned to Spain, joining second-tier Elche CF on a one-year contract with an option for a further year. He announced his retirement in March 2026, aged 35.

== International career ==
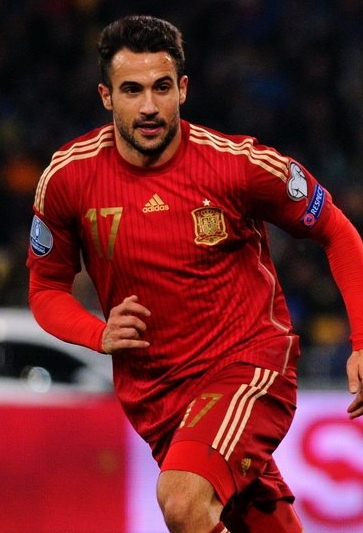
Gaspar with Spain in 2015

Mario Gaspar earned 16 caps for Spain at youth level, including two for the under-21s. He received his first call up to the senior side in October 2015, making his debut on the 12th by scoring the game's only goal in Ukraine – the last round, the nation had already secured the first position in its group – for the UEFA Euro 2016 qualifiers. He repeated the feat the following match, scoring an overhead kick to open a 2–0 friendly win against England in Alicante, with the strike being nominated for the FIFA Puskás Award.

== Career statistics ==
=== Club ===
As of match played 1 June 2025

Appearances and goals by club, season and competition
Club	Season	League			National cup (Note: Includes Copa del Rey, FA Cup)		League cup (Note: Includes EFL Cup)		Continental		Other		Total	
Club	Season	Division	Apps	Goals	Apps	Goals	Apps	Goals	Apps	Goals	Apps	Goals	Apps	Goals
Villarreal B	2007–08	Segunda División B	9	0	—		—		—		—		9	0
Villarreal B	2008–09	Segunda División B	31	0	—		—		—		6 (Note: Appearances in Segunda División B promotion play-offs)	0	37	0
Villarreal B	2009–10	Segunda División	31	0	—		—		—		—		31	0
Villarreal B	2010–11	Segunda División	8	0	—		—		—		—		8	0
Villarreal B	Total		79	0	—		—		—		6	0	85	0
Villarreal	2008–09	La Liga	1	0	0	0	—		—		—		1	0
Villarreal	2010–11	La Liga	22	0	5	0	—		11 (Note: Appearances in UEFA Europa League)	0	—		38	0
Villarreal	2011–12	La Liga	23	1	1	0	—		5 (Note: Appearances in UEFA Champions League)	0	—		29	1
Villarreal	2012–13	Segunda División	28	0	0	0	—		—		—		28	0
Villarreal	2013–14	La Liga	36	1	1	0	—		—		—		37	1
Villarreal	2014–15	La Liga	34	3	6	0	—		11	1	—		51	4
Villarreal	2015–16	La Liga	33	2	1	0	—		10	0	—		44	2
Villarreal	2016–17	La Liga	36	0	3	0	—		4 (Note: Two appearances in UEFA Champions League, two appearances in UEFA Europa League)	0	—		43	0
Villarreal	2017–18	La Liga	32	2	1	0	—		5	0	—		38	2
Villarreal	2018–19	La Liga	31	1	1	0	—		8	0	—		40	1
Villarreal	2019–20	La Liga	25	0	3	0	—		—		—		28	0
Villarreal	2020–21	La Liga	24	0	1	0	—		4	0	—		29	0
Villarreal	2021–22	La Liga	12	0	3	0	—		2	0	1 (Note: Appearance in UEFA Super Cup)	0	18	0
Villarreal	Total		337	10	26	0	—		60	1	1	0	424	11
Watford	2022–23	Championship	31	0	1	0	1	0	—		—		33	0
Elche	2023–24	Segunda División	32	3	2	0	—		—		—		34	3
Elche	2024–25	Segunda División	19	0	4	1	—		—		—		23	1
Elche	Total		51	3	6	1	—		—		—		57	4
Career total			498	13	33	1	1	0	60	1	7	0	599	15

=== International ===
Scores and results list Spain's goal tally first, score column indicates score after each Mario Gaspar goal.

List of international goals scored by Mario Gaspar
No.	Date	Venue	Opponent	Score	Result	Competition
1	12 October 2015	Olympic Stadium, Kyiv, Ukraine	Ukraine	1–0	1–0	UEFA Euro 2016 qualifying
2	13 November 2015	José Rico Pérez, Alicante, Spain	England	1–0	2–0	Friendly

== Honours ==
Villarreal

- UEFA Europa League: 2020–21
