= Jonathan Pereira (footballer) =

Spanish footballer (born 1987)

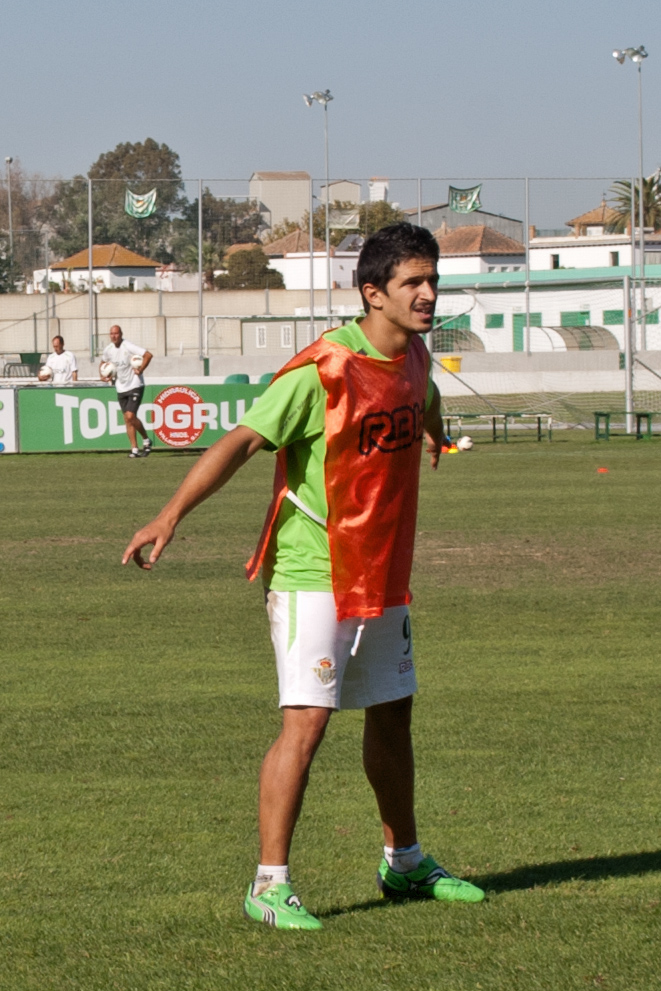
- Pereira training with Betis in 2011

Personal information
- Full name: Jonathan Pereira Rodríguez
- Date of birth: 12 May 1987 (age 39)
- Place of birth: Vigo, Spain
- Height: 1.66 m (5 ft 5 1/2 in)
- Position: Forward

Youth career
- Santa Mariña
- 2002–2004: Villarreal

Senior career*
Years	Team	Apps	(Gls)
2004–2007	Villarreal B	73	(51)
2006–2010	Villarreal	10	(1)
2007–2008	→ Racing Ferrol (loan)	39	(11)
2008–2009	→ Racing Santander (loan)	32	(5)
2010–2012	Betis	77	(16)
2013–2015	Villarreal	50	(11)
2014–2015	→ Rayo Vallecano (loan)	3	(0)
2015	→ Valladolid (loan)	20	(6)
2015–2016	Lugo	35	(9)
2016–2017	Oviedo	14	(2)
2017–2019	Alcorcón	63	(7)
2019–2021	Gimnàstic	16	(1)
Total		432	(120)

International career
2004	Spain U17	9	(1)
2007	Spain U20	1	(0)
2008–2009	Spain U21	3	(0)
2006–2007	Galicia	2	(1)
- * Club domestic league appearances and goals

Jonathan Pereira Rodríguez (born 12 May 1987) is a Spanish former professional footballer. A forward, his main asset was his incredible speed.

== Club career ==
Pereira was born in Vigo, Province of Pontevedra. After having completed his footballing education at Villarreal CF, he made his first-team – and La Liga – debut against Levante UD on 21 October 2006: he entered the pitch with 25 minutes to go and scored after only two minutes on the field, going on to total four league appearances throughout the season.

For 2007–08, Pereira was loaned to Segunda División club Racing de Ferrol, and finished the season at 11 goals, although the Galician team would be relegated. He returned to Villarreal in July 2008 and had his contract extended until 2013, being immediately loaned for the campaign to fellow top-flight side Racing de Santander. On 13 September, he scored a 77th-minute equaliser at the Camp Nou in a 1–1 draw with FC Barcelona; mainly used from the bench, he totalled eight goals in 41 matches (adding two in the UEFA Cup).

Pereira returned to Villarreal subsequently but, despite netting seven goals in a preseason friendly, he was very rarely used during the first months of 2009–10. In mid-January 2010, he left for second-tier Real Betis on a five-year deal, scoring in his debut on the 31st, the game's only at Andalusia neighbours Córdoba CF.

On 10 December 2012, Pereira returned to the Yellow Submarine, contributing four goals from 30 appearances in the second season in his second spell to help the team to finish in sixth position straight out of the second tier and qualify for the UEFA Europa League. On 5 August 2014, he moved to Rayo Vallecano for the season but, in the next transfer window, joined Real Valladolid also on loan.

After being released by Villarreal, Pereira went on to represent, always in the second division, CD Lugo, Real Oviedo and AD Alcorcón. On 28 July 2019, he signed a two-contract with Gimnàstic de Tarragona, recently relegated to Segunda División B.

Pereira terminated his contract with Nàstic on 1 February 2021, after failing to feature a single minute in 2020–21 due to a hip injury. He retired aged 34, and subsequently joined his childhood club UD Santa Mariña as youth system coordinator.

== Career statistics ==
As of 5 June 2011

Club performance			League		Cup		Continental		Total	
Season	Club	League	Apps	Goals	Apps	Goals	Apps	Goals	Apps	Goals
Spain			League		Copa del Rey		Europe		Total	
2006–07	Villarreal B	Tercera División								
2006–07	Villarreal	La Liga	4	1	-	-	-	-	4	1
2007–08	Racing Ferrol	Segunda División	39	11	0	0	-	-	39	11
2008–09	Racing Santander	La Liga	32	5			5	2	37	7
2009–10	Villarreal	La Liga	6	0					6	0
2009–10	Betis	Segunda División	22	9					22	9
2010–11	Betis	Segunda División	18	3	2	0			20	3
Total	Spain									
Career total										

== Honours ==
Betis

- Segunda División: 2010–11
