= Pablo Íñiguez =

Spanish footballer (born 1994)

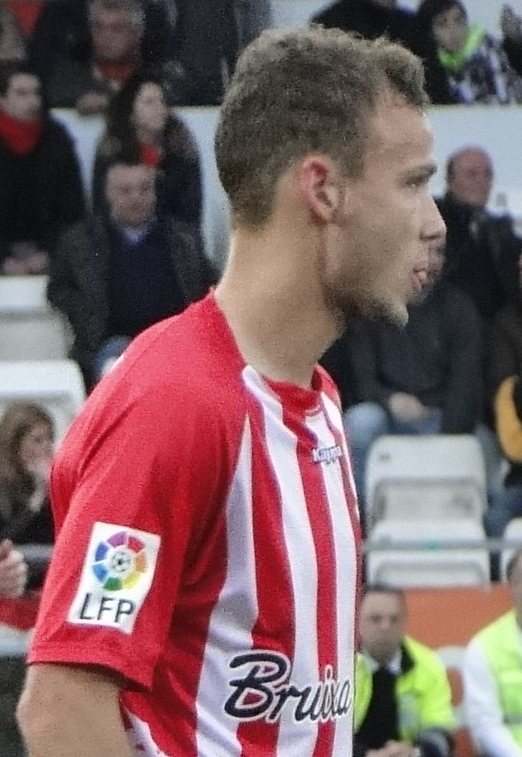
- Íñiguez with Girona in 2015

Personal information
- Full name: Pablo Íñiguez de Heredia Larraz
- Date of birth: 20 January 1994 (age 32)
- Place of birth: Burgos, Spain
- Height: 1.83 m (6 ft 0 in)
- Position: Centre-back

Youth career
- El Palmar
- 2003–2011: Villarreal

Senior career*
Years	Team	Apps	(Gls)
2011–2012	Villarreal C	18	(1)
2012–2016	Villarreal B	66	(1)
2012–2017	Villarreal	10	(0)
2014–2015	→ Girona (loan)	16	(0)
2016–2017	→ Rayo Vallecano (loan)	6	(0)
2017–2019	Reus	13	(0)
2018–2019	→ Hércules (loan)	33	(3)
2019–2021	Hércules	25	(0)
2021	Levante B	16	(0)
2021–2024	Villarreal B	65	(2)

International career
2011	Spain U17	4	(1)
2013	Spain U19	7	(0)
2012–2013	Spain U20	5	(1)
2014	Spain U21	1	(0)
- * Club domestic league appearances and goals as of 8 June 2024

Pablo Íñiguez de Heredia Larraz (born 20 January 1994), known as Íñiguez, is a Spanish professional footballer who plays mainly as a central defender but also as a defensive midfielder.

== Club career ==
Born in Burgos, Íñiguez joined Villarreal CF's academy in 2003, aged only nine. He was selected by the first team for a La Liga match against Real Betis on 19 November 2011, but did not leave the bench; he met the same fate against FC Bayern Munich in the group stage of the UEFA Champions League.

On 14 January 2012, one week before his 18th birthday, Íñiguez made his professional debut, appearing for the reserves against FC Cartagena in the Segunda División. He played his first competitive game with the main squad on 2 December, starting in a 1–0 away loss to Elche CF in the same league.

Iñiguez signed a new five-year contract with Villarreal, recently returned to the top flight, on 27 August 2013. His bow in the competition took place on 19 August, when he featured the entire 3–2 away win over UD Almería. On 21 August of the following year, he moved to second division club Girona FC in a season-long loan.

On 5 July 2016, Íñiguez was loaned to Rayo Vallecano for one season. In July 2015, he joined fellow second-tier side CF Reus Deportiu permanently, with Villarreal holding a buy-back clause.

Íñiguez agreed to a two-year deal at Hércules CF on 10 July 2019, after a loan spell.

== International career ==
Íñiguez represented Spain at under-17, under-19, under-20 and under-21 levels. He won his only cap for the latter on 12 November 2014, when he played 85 minutes in the 4–1 friendly loss to Belgium in Ferrol.

== Personal life ==
Íñiguez's father, Roberto, was a basketball player who competed in the Liga ACB. He later became a manager.
