= 2016–17 RCD Espanyol season =

RCD Espanyol
2016–17 season
- President: Joan Collet i Diví
- Head coach: Quique Sánchez Flores
- Stadium: Cornellà-El Prat
- La Liga: 8th
- Copa del Rey: Round of 32
- Top goalscorer: League: Gerard (13); All: Gerard (13)
| Home colours | Away colours | Third colours |

Reial Club Deportiu Espanyol de Barcelona, commonly known as RCD Espanyol, or simply as Espanyol, is a professional sports club based in Barcelona, Catalonia, Spain. During the 2016–17 campaign they competed in La Liga and the Copa del Rey.

== Players ==
=== First-team squad ===
As of 31 January 2017

Note: Flags indicate national team as defined under FIFA eligibility rules; some limited exceptions apply. Players may hold more than one non-FIFA nationality.

| No. | Pos. | Nation | Player |
|---|---|---|---|
| 1 | GK | ESP | Roberto |
| 3 | DF | ESP | Rubén Duarte |
| 4 | MF | ESP | Víctor Sánchez (vice-captain) |
| 5 | DF | ESP | Víctor Álvarez (3rd captain) |
| 6 | DF | CRC | Óscar Duarte |
| 7 | FW | ESP | Gerard |
| 8 | MF | ESP | Salva Sevilla |
| 9 | MF | ESP | José Antonio Reyes |
| 10 | FW | ECU | Felipe Caicedo |
| 11 | FW | BRA | Léo Baptistão |
| 12 | DF | ESP | Aarón Martín |
| 13 | GK | ESP | Diego López (on loan from Milan) |

| No. | Pos. | Nation | Player |
|---|---|---|---|
| 14 | MF | ESP | José Manuel Jurado |
| 15 | MF | ESP | David López |
| 16 | DF | ESP | Javi López (captain) |
| 17 | MF | PAR | Hernán Pérez |
| 18 | MF | ESP | Javi Fuego |
| 19 | MF | ARG | Pablo Piatti (on loan from Valencia) |
| 20 | MF | SEN | Pape Diop |
| 22 | FW | ESP | Álvaro Vázquez |
| 23 | DF | MEX | Diego Reyes (on loan from Porto) |
| 28 | MF | ESP | Marc Roca |
| 30 | MF | ESP | Óscar Melendo |
| 31 | DF | ESP | Marc Navarro |

=== Out on loan ===
Note: Flags indicate national team as defined under FIFA eligibility rules; some limited exceptions apply. Players may hold more than one non-FIFA nationality.

| No. | Pos. | Nation | Player |
|---|---|---|---|
| — | GK | ESP | Pau López (on loan at Tottenham Hotspur) |
| — | DF | ESP | Rober Correa (on loan at Elche) |
| — | DF | ESP | Edgar González (on loan at Cornellà) |
| — | MF | ESP | Joan Jordán (on loan at Valladolid) |

| No. | Pos. | Nation | Player |
|---|---|---|---|
| — | MF | ESP | Paco Montañés (on loan at Levante) |
| — | FW | ESP | Jairo Morillas (on loan at Numancia) |
| — | FW | ESP | Adrián Dalmau (on loan at Mallorca) |
| — | FW | SEN | Mamadou Sylla (on loan at Eupen) |

== Competitions ==
=== La Liga ===
==== League table ====
| Pos | Team | Pld | W | D | L | GF | GA | GD | Pts | Qualification or relegation |
|---|---|---|---|---|---|---|---|---|---|---|
| 6 | Real Sociedad | 38 | 19 | 7 | 12 | 59 | 53 | +6 | 64 | Qualification for the Europa League group stage (Note: Since the winners of the 2016–17 Copa del Rey, Barcelona, qualified for European competition based on league position, the spot awarded to the cup winners (Europa League group stage) was passed to the sixth-placed team and the spot awarded to the sixth-placed team (Europa League third qualifying round) was passed to the seventh-placed team.) |
| 7 | Athletic Bilbao | 38 | 19 | 6 | 13 | 53 | 43 | +10 | 63 | Qualification for the Europa League third qualifying round |
| 8 | Espanyol | 38 | 15 | 11 | 12 | 49 | 50 | −1 | 56 | |
| 9 | Alavés | 38 | 14 | 13 | 11 | 41 | 43 | −2 | 55 | |
| 10 | Eibar | 38 | 15 | 9 | 14 | 56 | 51 | +5 | 54 | |

Source: La Liga, Soccerway
Rules for classification: 1) Points; 2) Head-to-head points; 3) Head-to-head goal difference; 4) Goal difference; 5) Goals scored; 6) Fair-play points; 7) Play-off.

==== Results summary ====
| Overall | | | | | | | | Home | | | | | | Away | | | | | |
| Pld | W | D | L | GF | GA | GD | Pts | W | D | L | GF | GA | GD | W | D | L | GF | GA | GD |
|---|---|---|---|---|---|---|---|---|---|---|---|---|---|---|---|---|---|---|---|
| 38 | 15 | 11 | 12 | 49 | 50 | −1 | 56 | 8 | 5 | 6 | 28 | 24 | +4 | 7 | 6 | 6 | 21 | 26 | −5 |

Last updated: 19 May 2017.

==== Results by matchday ====
| Matchday | 1 | 2 | 3 | 4 | 5 | 6 | 7 | 8 | 9 | 10 | 11 | 12 | 13 | 14 | 15 | 16 | 17 | 18 | 19 | 20 | 21 | 22 | 23 | 24 | 25 | 26 | 27 | 28 | 29 | 30 | 31 | 32 | 33 | 34 | 35 | 36 | 37 | 38 |
|---|---|---|---|---|---|---|---|---|---|---|---|---|---|---|---|---|---|---|---|---|---|---|---|---|---|---|---|---|---|---|---|---|---|---|---|---|---|---|
| Ground | A | H | A | H | A | H | H | A | H | A | H | A | H | A | H | A | H | A | H | H | A | H | A | H | A | A | H | A | H | A | H | A | H | A | H | A | H | A |
| Result | L | D | D | L | W | L | D | D | D | W | D | W | W | D | W | L | D | L | W | W | W | L | L | W | D | L | W | D | W | L | W | W | L | D | L | W | L | W |
| Position | 12 | 12 | 12 | 14 | 14 | 14 | 12 | 12 | 12 | 10 | 10 | 10 | 10 | 10 | 10 | 10 | 10 | 10 | 10 | 8 | 8 | 9 | 9 | 9 | 9 | 9 | 9 | 9 | 9 | 9 | 9 | 9 | 9 | 9 | 9 | 9 | 9 | 8 |

Updated to match(es) played on 19 May 2017. Source:
A = Away; H = Home; W = Win; D = Draw; L = Loss

==== Matches ====
| 20 August 2016 1 | Sevilla | 6–4 | Espanyol | Seville |
| 22:15 CEST | Sarabia 15'; Vietto 22', 45+1', (yellow card) 64'; Mercado (yellow card) 40'; Vázquez 54'; Ben Yedder 66'; Kiyotake 74' | Summary | Piatti 8'; Pérez 26', (yellow card) 38'; Sánchez 44'; Álvaro (yellow card) 45+3'; Gerard 79' | Stadium: Ramón Sánchez Pizjuán; Attendance: 29,420; Referee: José González González |

| 26 August 2016 2 | Espanyol | 2–2 | Málaga | Barcelona |
| 22:00 CEST | Gerard 28', 61'; Álvaro (yellow card) 68'; Piatti (yellow card) 89' | Summary | Ricca (yellow card) 9'; Camacho (yellow card) 64'; Llorente 67'; Koné (yellow card) 74'; Kameni (yellow card) 89'; Charles 90' | Stadium: RCDE Stadium; Attendance: 17,304; Referee: Jesús Gil Manzano |

| 9 September 2016 3 | Real Sociedad | 1–1 | Espanyol | San Sebastián |
| 20:45 CEST | Illarramendi (yellow card) 44'; Zurutuza (yellow card) 75'; Willian José 78' | Summary | Ó. Duarte (yellow card) 14'; Piatti 62'; R. Duarte (yellow card) 77'; Fuego (yellow card) 88' (yellow-red card) 90+2' | Stadium: Anoeta; Attendance: 19,595; Referee: Ignacio Iglesias Villanueva |

| 18 September 2016 4 | Espanyol | 0–2 | Real Madrid | Barcelona |
| 20:45 CEST | Pérez (yellow card) 21'; Ó. Duarte (yellow card) 44'; Diop (yellow card) 54'; J. López (yellow card) 64' | Summary | Ramos (yellow card) 3'; Rodríguez 45+2'; Benzema 71'; Carvajal (yellow card) 84' | Stadium: RCDE Stadium; Attendance: 30,153; Referee: (Spain) Alejandro Hernández |

| 22 September 2016 5 | Osasuna | 1–2 | Espanyol | Pamplona |
| 20:00 CEST | I. García (yellow card) 38'; Sergio León 68', (yellow card) 87' | Summary | Baptistão 42'; Diop (yellow card) 51'; Gerard 72' | Stadium: El Sadar; Attendance: 14,597; Referee: Iñaki Vicandi Garrido |

| 25 September 2016 6 | Espanyol | 0–2 | Celta Vigo | Barcelona |
| 20:45 CEST | Roca (yellow card) 43'; Ó. Duarte (yellow card) 87' | Summary | Roncaglia (yellow card) 29'; Aspas (yellow card) 75'; Hernández (yellow card) 86'; Rossi 90+1'; Sisto 90+3' | Stadium: RCDE Stadium; Attendance: 16,656; Referee: Alberto Undiano Mallenco |

| 2 October 2016 7 | Espanyol | 0–0 | Villarreal | Barcelona |
| 18:30 CEST | Sánchez (yellow card) 54'; Pérez (yellow card) 65' | Summary | Musacchio (yellow card) 52'; Mario (yellow card) 90+3' | Stadium: RCDE Stadium; Attendance: 19,666; Referee: José Luis Munuera Montero |

| 14 October 2016 8 | Las Palmas | 0–0 | Espanyol | Las Palmas |
| 20:45 CEST | Livaja (yellow card) 54'; Aythami (yellow card) 85' | Summary | Fuego (yellow card) 35'; Sánchez (yellow card) 60'; Roca (yellow card) 88' | Stadium: Gran Canaria; Attendance: 20,542; Referee: David Fernández Borbalán |

| 22 October 2016 9 | Espanyol | 3–3 | Eibar | Barcelona |
| 13:00 CEST | Pérez 64'; Piatti 73'; Baptistão (yellow card) 75', (goal) 90+2'; Caicedo (yellow card) 79' (yellow-red card) 84' | Summary | Pedro León (yellow card) 11'; Lejeune (yellow card) 17'; Enrich 23'; D. Reyes 27' (o.g.); Inui (yellow card) 37'; Kike 44', (yellow card) 89'; Rico (yellow card) 77'; Luna (yellow card) 80' | Stadium: RCDE Stadium; Attendance: 17,072; Referee: Jesús Gil Manzano |

| 30 October 2016 10 | Real Betis | 0–1 | Espanyol | Seville |
| 18:30 CET | Pezzella (yellow card) 28'; Martin (yellow card) 54'; Gutiérrez (yellow card) 69' | Summary | Pérez (yellow card) 55'; D. Reyes 62'; Piatti (yellow card) 66'; Sánchez (yellow card) 79' | Stadium: Benito Villamarín; Attendance: 38,282; Referee: Ricardo de Burgos Bengoetxea |

| 6 November 2016 11 | Espanyol | 0–0 | Athletic Bilbao | Barcelona |
| 16:15 CET | Fuego (yellow card) 12' | Summary | Eraso (yellow card) 6'; Rico (yellow card) 45' | Stadium: RCDE Stadium; Attendance: 21,904; Referee: Daniel Trujillo Suárez |

| 20 November 2016 12 | Alavés | 0–1 | Espanyol | Vitoria-Gasteiz |
| 12:00 CET | Feddal (yellow card) 26'; Femenía (yellow card) 47'; Camarasa (yellow card) 57'; Deyverson (yellow card) 60'; Alexis (yellow card) 78' | Summary | Pérez (yellow card) 15'; Víctor Sánchez (yellow card) 60'; Gerard 81' | Stadium: Mendizorrotza; Attendance: 19,550; Referee: Mario Melero López |

| 26 November 2016 13 | Espanyol | 3–0 | Leganés | Barcelona |
| 18:30 CET | Gerard 46'; Piatti 51', 88'; Jurado (yellow card) 68' | Summary | Díaz (yellow card) 16'; Mantovani (yellow card) 47' | Stadium: RCDE Stadium; Attendance: 17,137; Referee: Juan Martínez Munuera |

| 3 December 2016 14 | Atlético Madrid | 0–0 | Espanyol | Madrid |
| 20:45 CET | Koke (yellow card) 30'; Godín (yellow card) 88' | Summary | Diop (yellow card) 23'; Gerard (yellow card) 75' | Stadium: Vicente Calderón; Attendance: 39,707; Referee: Santiago Jaime Latre |

| 11 December 2016 15 | Espanyol | 2–1 | Sporting de Gijón | Barcelona |
| 18:30 CET | Caicedo 54'; Diop (yellow card) 68'; Baptistão 90' | Summary | Aït-Atmane (yellow card) 84'; Álvarez (yellow card) 86'; Čop 90+2' | Stadium: RCDE Stadium; Attendance: 19,353; Referee: Carlos del Cerro Grande |

| 18 December 2016 16 | Barcelona | 4–1 | Espanyol | Barcelona |
| 20:45 CET | L. Suárez 18', 67'; Alba 68'; Messi 90' | Summary | Piatti (yellow card) 10'; Martín (yellow card) 13'; Caicedo (yellow card) 65'; David López 79' | Stadium: Camp Nou; Attendance: 79,370; Referee: Antonio Mateu Lahoz |

| 6 January 2017 17 | Espanyol | 1–1 | Deportivo La Coruña | Barcelona |
| 20:45 CET | Sevilla (yellow card) 27'; Gerard 63' | Summary | Juanfran (yellow card) 17' (yellow-red card) 90'; Guilherme (yellow card) 24'; Borges 59' | Stadium: RCDE Stadium; Attendance: 16,087; Referee: Ricardo de Burgos Bengoetxea |

| 15 January 2017 18 | Valencia | 2–1 | Espanyol | Valencia |
| 12:00 CET | Montoya 17'; Soler (yellow card) 54'; Parejo (yellow card) 56'; Gayà (yellow card) 57'; Munir (yellow card) 59'; Mina 73'; Alves (yellow card) 75' | Summary | David López 85' | Stadium: Mestalla; Attendance: 33,932; Referee: José María Sánchez Martínez |

| 21 January 2017 19 | Espanyol | 3–1 | Granada | Barcelona |
| 13:00 CET | J. Reyes 11'; Piatti 32'; Navarro 48' | Summary | Ingason (yellow card) 18'; Pereira 23', (yellow card) 90+2'; Foulquier (yellow card) 49' | Stadium: RCDE Stadium; Attendance: 14,813; Referee: Carlos Clos Gómez |

| 29 January 2017 20 | Espanyol | 3–1 | Sevilla | Barcelona |
| 16:15 CET | J. Reyes 4' (pen.); Martín (yellow card) 32'; Navarro 45+2'; Gerard 71', (yellow card) 81' | Report | Pareja (red card) 2'; Jovetić 20'; Escudero (yellow card) 76'; Sarabia (yellow card) 81' | Stadium: RCDE Stadium; Attendance: 22,280; Referee: Iñaki Vicandi Garrido |

| 4 February 2017 21 | Málaga | 0–1 | Espanyol | Málaga |
| 13:00 CET | Demichelis (yellow card) 41' | Report | Piatti 17', (yellow card) 52'; Pérez (yellow card) 33'; Roca (yellow card) 70'; Diego López (yellow card) 89' | Stadium: La Rosaleda; Attendance: 21,886; Referee: Daniel Ocón Arráiz |

| 10 February 2017 22 | Espanyol | 1–2 | Real Sociedad | Barcelona |
| 20:45 CET | D. Reyes (yellow card) 30'; Pérez 35', (yellow card) 78'; J. Reyes (yellow card) 90+1' | Report | Vela 26', (yellow card) 85'; Illarramendi 61'; Zurutuza (yellow card) 90' | Stadium: RCDE Stadium; Attendance: 17,849; Referee: David Fernández Borbalán |

| 18 February 2017 23 | Real Madrid | 2–0 | Espanyol | Madrid |
| 16:15 CET | Morata 33'; Kovačić (yellow card) 41'; Isco (yellow card) 48'; Casemiro (yellow card) 82'; Bale 83' | Report | Gerard (yellow card) 28'; Fuego (yellow card) 53'; Diop (yellow card) 68'; Martín (yellow card) 80' | Stadium: Santiago Bernabéu; Attendance: 72,234; Referee: Alberto Undiano Mallenco |

| 26 February 2017 24 | Espanyol | 3–0 | Osasuna | Barcelona |
| 12:00 CET | Caicedo 17'; David López (yellow card) 24'; Jurado 46'; Gerard 90+1' | Report | Rivière (yellow card) 24'; D. García (yellow card) 25'; Oier (red card) 27'; Berenguer (yellow card) 71'; Mérida (yellow card) 76' | Stadium: RCDE Stadium; Attendance: 18,766; Referee: Carlos Clos Gómez |

| 1 March 2017 25 | Celta Vigo | 2–2 | Espanyol | Vigo |
| 21:30 CET | Aspas 21'; Guidetti (yellow card) 24'; Fontàs (yellow card) 26' (yellow-red card) 43'; Wass 30'; Díaz (yellow card) 68' | | Gerard 28', (yellow card) 78'; Piatti 32'; Pérez (yellow card) 70' | Stadium: Balaídos; Attendance: 11,391; Referee: Santiago Jaime Latre |

| 4 March 2017 26 | Villarreal | 2–0 | Espanyol | Villarreal |
| 18:30 CET | Costa (yellow card) 3'; Soriano 45'; Álvaro (yellow card) 54'; Bakambu 80' | Report | Diego López (yellow card) 28'; Ó. Duarte (yellow card) 66' | Stadium: La Cerámica; Referee: Ricardo de Burgos Bengoetxea |

| 10 March 2017 27 | Espanyol | 4–3 | Las Palmas | Barcelona |
| 20:45 CET | David López 1', (yellow card) 49'; Gerard 45+1'; Piatti (yellow card) 51', (goal) 53' (pen.); Jurado 74' | Report | Lemos 31', 49', (yellow card) 80'; Lizoain (yellow card) 51'; Bigas (yellow card) 80'; M. García 84'; Jesé (yellow card) 87' | Stadium: RCDE Stadium; Attendance: 17,669; Referee: José Luis Munuera Montero |

| 18 March 2017 28 | Eibar | 1–1 | Espanyol | Eibar |
| 13:00 | Escalante (yellow card) 7'; Kike 20'; Gálvez (yellow card) 70' | Report | Diop (yellow card) 28'; Jurado 50'; J. Reyes (yellow card) 61'; Caicedo (yellow card) 81'; Aarón Martín (yellow card) 89' | Stadium: Ipurua; Attendance: 5,325; Referee: David Fernández Borbalán |

| 31 March 2017 29 | Espanyol | 2–1 | Real Betis | Barcelona |
| 20:45 | Fuego (yellow card) 76', (goal) 87'; J. López (yellow card) 82'; Gerard (yellow card) 88'; J. Reyes 90' | Report | Castro 78' (pen.); Petros (yellow card) 87'; Navarro (yellow card) 90' | Stadium: RCDE Stadium; Attendance: 21,090; Referee: José González González |

| 4 April 2017 30 | Athletic Bilbao | 2–0 | Espanyol | Bilbao |
| 19:30 | Aduriz 17' (pen.), 37'; Y. Álvarez (yellow card) 27' | Report | V. Álvarez (yellow card) 18'; David López (yellow card) 37'; Fuego (yellow card) 90+1' | Stadium: San Mamés; Attendance: 38,262; Referee: Juan Martínez Munuera |

| 8 April 2017 31 | Espanyol | 1–0 | Alavés | Barcelona |
| 13:00 | Piatti 56'; J. López (yellow card) 73'; Diego López (yellow card) 90+1'; Sánchez (yellow card) 90+2' | Report | Édgar (yellow card) 51'; Feddal (yellow card) 90+1'; Laguardia (yellow card) 90+2' | Stadium: RCDE Stadium; Attendance: 17,521; Referee: Mario Melero López |

| 16 April 2017 32 | Leganés | 0–1 | Espanyol | Leganés |
| 12:00 CEST | Pérez (yellow card) 63' | Report | Fuego (yellow card) 53'; Baptistão 90+2' | Stadium: Butarque; Attendance: 9,127; Referee: Carlos Clos Gómez |

| 22 April 2017 33 | Espanyol | 0–1 | Atlético Madrid | Barcelona |
| 20:45 CEST | Caicedo (yellow card) 30'; Piatti (yellow card) 63'; Sánchez (yellow card) 90+2' | Report | Godín (yellow card) 27'; Saúl (yellow card) 57'; Griezmann 73' | Stadium: RCDE Stadium; Attendance: 27,777; Referee: Iñaki Vicandi Garrido |

| 25 April 2017 34 | Sporting Gijón | 1–1 | Espanyol | Gijón |
| 19:30 CEST | Rodríguez (yellow card) 18', (goal) 39' | Report | Fuego (yellow card) 15'; Gerard 55'; Sánchez (yellow card) 83' | Stadium: El Molinón; Attendance: 20,956; Referee: Mario Melero López |

| 29 April 2017 35 | Espanyol | 0–3 | Barcelona | Barcelona |
| 20:45 CEST | Gerard (yellow card) 14'; Martín (yellow card) 58'; Fuego (yellow card) 68' | Report | L. Suárez 50', 87'; Rakitić 76' | Stadium: RCDE Stadium; Attendance: 31,708; Referee: Alberto Undiano Mallenco |

| 7 May 2017 36 | Deportivo La Coruña | 1–2 | Espanyol | A Coruña |
| 18:30 CEST | Andone 47'; Gil (yellow card) 60' | Report | Baptistão 14'; Gerard 29'; Piatti (yellow card) 78'; Sánchez (yellow card) 81' | Stadium: Riazor; Attendance: 22,803; Referee: Antonio Mateu Lahoz |

| 13 May 2017 37 | Espanyol | 0–1 | Valencia | Barcelona |
| 16:00 CEST | | Summary | Nani (yellow card) 34'; Orellana (yellow card) 59'; Gayà 75'; Medrán (yellow card) 81'; Montoya (yellow card) 85' | Stadium: RCDE Stadium; Attendance: 20,111; Referee: Daniel Ocón Arráiz |

| 19 May 2017 38 | Granada | 1–2 | Espanyol | Granada |
| 20:45 CEST | Pereira 22' | Summary | Baptistão 3'; Vezo 8' (o.g.); Roca (yellow card) 62'; Piatti (yellow card) 66'; Álvarez (yellow card) 90+1' | Stadium: Los Cármenes; Attendance: 10,503; Referee: Carlos Clos Gómez |

=== Copa del Rey ===
==== Round of 32 ====
| 29 November 2016 First leg | Alcorcón | 1–1 | Espanyol | Alcorcón |
| 21:00 | Elgezabal (yellow card) 11'; Giménez 51'; Páez (yellow card) 55'; Aguza (yellow card) 66' | Summary | Álvarez (yellow card) 39'; Diop (yellow card) 41'; J. Reyes 84'; J. López (yellow card) 89' | Stadium: Santo Domingo; Attendance: 1,687; Referee: Jesús Gil Manzano |

| 22 December 2016 Second leg | Espanyol | 1–1 (a.e.t.) (2–2 agg.) (3–4 p) | Alcorcón | Barcelona |
| 21:00 | H. Pérez 84' | Summary | Giménez 20'; Plano (yellow card) 81' | Stadium: RCDE Stadium; Attendance: 9,143; Referee: Ricardo de Burgos Bengoetxea |
| | Penalties |
| | Piatti (penalty scored); Martín (penalty scored); Gerard (penalty missed); H. Pérez (penalty scored); Jurado (penalty missed) | | (penalty scored) Rodríguez; (penalty scored) V. Pérez; (penalty missed) Plano; (penalty scored) Samu; (penalty scored) Álvaro |
