= Óscar Melendo =

Spanish footballer

Personal information
- Full name: Óscar Melendo Jiménez
- Date of birth: 23 August 1997 (age 29)
- Place of birth: Barcelona, Spain
- Height: 1.67 m (5 ft 6 in)
- Position: Winger

Team information
- Current team: Shanghai Port
- Number: 21

Youth career
- 2003–2016: Espanyol

Senior career*
Years	Team	Apps	(Gls)
2016–2017	Espanyol B	24	(1)
2017–2022	Espanyol	134	(3)
2022–2024	Granada	61	(1)
2024–2025	Cádiz	21	(2)
2025–	Shanghai Port	28	(2)

International career
2019	Catalonia	1	(0)
- * Club domestic league appearances and goals as of 10:30, 8 November 2026 (UTC)

Óscar Melendo Jiménez (born 23 August 1997) is a Spanish professional footballer who plays as a right winger for Chinese Super League club Shanghai Port.

== Club career ==
=== Espanyol ===
Born in Barcelona, Catalonia, Melendo joined RCD Espanyol's youth setup in 2003, aged six. On 8 June 2016, he was promoted to the reserves in the Segunda División B, and signed a three-year deal with the club on 20 July.

Melendo appeared in his first professional match on 20 August 2016, starting in a 1–1 away draw against UE Llagostera. He made his first-team – and La Liga – debut on 20 November, coming on as a second-half substitute for Hernán Pérez in the 1–0 away win over Deportivo Alavés.

On 1 February 2017, Melendo renewed his contract until 2022 and was definitely promoted to the main squad ahead of the 2017–18 season. On 17 January of the following year, he scored a late winner to help the hosts defeat FC Barcelona 1–0 in the first leg of the quarter-finals of the Copa del Rey.

Melendo left Espanyol on 30 June 2022 as his contract was expiring, after failing to reach an agreement for a renewal. He played a total of 161 games, scoring six goals.

=== Granada ===
On 6 August 2022, Melendo signed a one-year deal with Granada CF, recently relegated to Segunda División. He scored his only goal on 15 April 2023 in a 2–1 home victory over UD Las Palmas, in an eventual promotion as champions, but failed to find the net while playing 1,000 minutes less the following campaign as his side was immediately relegated.

=== Cádiz ===
On 30 August 2024, Melendo joined Cádiz CF on a three-year contract. In July 2025, however, he left as a free agent.

=== Shanghai Port ===
On 8 July 2025, Melendo moved to Shanghai Port F.C. of the Chinese Super League.

== International career ==
On 20 March 2019, Melendo was called up by Catalonia for a friendly against Venezuela. Five days later, he started in the 2–1 win at the Estadi Montilivi.

== Career statistics ==
As of match played 8 November 2026

Appearances and goals by club, season and competition
Club	Season	League			National cup		Continental		Total	
Club	Season	Division	Apps	Goals	Apps	Goals	Apps	Goals	Apps	Goals
Espanyol B	2016–17	Segunda División B	24	1	–		—		24	1
Espanyol	2016–17	La Liga	11	0	2	0	—		13	0
Espanyol	2017–18	La Liga	18	1	5	1	—		23	2
Espanyol	2018–19	La Liga	32	0	5	0	—		37	0
Espanyol	2019–20	La Liga	24	0	1	0	10	2	35	2
Espanyol	2020–21	Segunda División	28	2	1	0	—		29	2
Espanyol	2021–22	La Liga	21	0	3	0	—		24	0
Espanyol	Total		134	3	17	1	10	2	161	6
Granada	2022–23	Segunda División	35	1	0	0	—		35	1
Granada	2023–24	La Liga	26	0	0	0	—		26	0
Granada	Total		61	1	0	0	—		61	1
Cádiz	2024–25	Segunda División	21	2	1	0	—		22	2
Shanghai Port	2025	Chinese Super League	13	1	0	0	6	0	19	1
Shanghai Port	2026	Chinese Super League	15	1	2	0	5	0	22	1
Shanghai Port	Total		28	2	2	0	11	0	41	2
Career total			268	9	20	1	21	2	309	12

== Honours ==
Espanyol

- Segunda División: 2020–21

Granada

- Segunda División: 2022–23

Shanghai Port

- Chinese Super League: 2025
