= 2017–18 RCD Espanyol season =

RCD Espanyol
2017–18 season
- President: Chen Yansheng
- Head coach: Quique Sánchez Flores
- Stadium: Cornellà-El Prat
- La Liga: 11th
- Copa del Rey: Quarter-finals
- Top goalscorer: League: Gerard (16); All: Gerard (19)
| Home colours | Away colours | Third colours |

During the 2017–18 season, RCD Espanyol participated in La Liga and the Copa del Rey.

== Squad ==
As of 17 August 2017

Note: Flags indicate national team as defined under FIFA eligibility rules; some limited exceptions apply. Players may hold more than one non-FIFA nationality.

| No. | Pos. | Nation | Player |
|---|---|---|---|
| 1 | GK | ESP | Pau |
| 2 | DF | ESP | Marc Navarro |
| 3 | DF | ESP | Aarón Martín |
| 4 | MF | ESP | Víctor Sánchez (vice-captain) |
| 5 | DF | BRA | Naldo |
| 6 | DF | CRC | Óscar Duarte |
| 7 | FW | ESP | Gerard |
| 8 | FW | ESP | Álvaro Vázquez |
| 9 | FW | ESP | Sergio García (4th captain) |
| 10 | MF | ESP | José Manuel Jurado |
| 11 | FW | BRA | Léo Baptistão |
| 13 | GK | ESP | Diego López |

| No. | Pos. | Nation | Player |
|---|---|---|---|
| 14 | MF | ESP | Óscar Melendo |
| 15 | MF | ESP | David López (3rd captain) |
| 16 | DF | ESP | Javi López (captain) |
| 17 | MF | PAR | Hernán Pérez |
| 18 | MF | ESP | Javi Fuego |
| 19 | MF | ARG | Pablo Piatti |
| 20 | MF | SEN | Pape Diop |
| 22 | DF | ESP | Mario Hermoso |
| 23 | MF | ESP | Esteban Granero |
| 24 | MF | ESP | Marc Roca |
| — | FW | ESP | Jairo Morillas |

== Transfers ==
=== In ===
| Date | Player | From | Type | Fee | Ref |
|---|---|---|---|---|---|
| 23 May 2017 | (Spain) Diego López | (Italy) Milan | Transfer | €1,000,000 | |
| 24 May 2017 | (Argentina) Pablo Piatti | (Spain) Valencia | Transfer | €1,500,000 | |
| 30 June 2017 | (Spain) Pau | (England) Tottenham Hotspur | Loan return | Free | |
| 30 June 2017 | (Spain) Paco Montañés | (Spain) Levante | Loan return | Free | |
| 30 June 2017 | (Spain) Jairo Morillas | (Spain) Numancia | Loan return | Free | |
| 30 June 2017 | (Spain) Joan Jordán | (Spain) Valladolid | Loan return | Free | |
| 30 June 2017 | (Spain) Rober | (Spain) Elche | Loan return | Free | |
| 1 July 2017 | (Spain) Óscar Melendo | (Spain) Espanyol B | Promoted | | |
| 7 July 2017 | (Spain) Esteban Granero | (Spain) Real Sociedad | Transfer | Free | |
| 12 July 2017 | (Spain) Mario Hermoso | (Spain) Real Madrid B | Transfer | €300,000 | |

=== Out ===
| Date | Player | To | Type | Fee | Ref |
|---|---|---|---|---|---|
| 22 May 2017 | (Senegal) Mamadou Sylla | (Belgium) Eupen | Transfer | €2,300,000 | |
| 22 May 2017 | (Spain) José Antonio Reyes | Unattached | | Free | |
| 29 May 2017 | (Spain) Rubén Duarte | (Spain) Alavés | Transfer | €400,000 | |
| 30 June 2017 | (Mexico) Diego Reyes | (Portugal) Porto | Loan return | Free | |
| 5 July 2017 | (Spain) Roberto | (Spain) Málaga | Loan | Free | |
| 13 July 2017 | (Spain) Joan Jordán | (Spain) Eibar | Transfer | €100,000 | |
| 20 July 2017 | (Spain) Víctor Álvarez | (Russia) Arsenal Tula | Transfer | Free | |
| 2 August 2017 | (Ecuador) Felipe Caicedo | (Italy) Lazio | transfer | €2,500,000 | |
| 17 August 2017 | (Spain) Paco Montañés | (Spain) Tenerife | Transfer | Free | |
| 28 August 2017 | (Spain) Salva Sevilla | (Spain) Mallorca | Transfer | Free | |

== Pre-season and friendlies ==
| Team 1 | Score | Team 2 |
|---|---|---|
| Persija Jakarta | 0–7 | Espanyol |
| Olot | 0–4 | Espanyol |
| Borussia Dortmund | 0–1 | Espanyol |
| Twente | 0–0 | Espanyol |
| Hamburger SV | 1–1 | Espanyol |
| Napoli | 2–0 | Espanyol |

== Competitions ==
=== Overall ===
| Competition | Final position |
|---|---|
| La Liga | 11th |
| Copa del Rey | Quarter-finals |

=== La Liga ===
==== League table ====
| Pos | Team | Pld | W | D | L | GF | GA | GD | Pts |
|---|---|---|---|---|---|---|---|---|---|
| 9 | Eibar | 38 | 14 | 9 | 15 | 44 | 50 | −6 | 51 (Note: Eibar finished ahead of Girona on head-to-head points: Eibar 4–1 Girona, Girona 1–4 Eibar.) |
| 10 | Girona | 38 | 14 | 9 | 15 | 50 | 59 | −9 | 51 |
| 11 | Espanyol | 38 | 12 | 13 | 13 | 36 | 42 | −6 | 49 (Note: Head-to-head points: Espanyol 8, Real Sociedad 4, Celta Vigo 4 (Espanyol 2–1 Real Sociedad, Real Sociedad 1–1 Espanyol, Espanyol 2–1 Celta Vigo, Celta Vigo 2–2 Espanyol, Real Sociedad 1–2 Celta Vigo, Celta Vigo 2–3 Real Sociedad).) |
| 12 | Real Sociedad | 38 | 14 | 7 | 17 | 66 | 59 | +7 | 49 |
| 13 | Celta Vigo | 38 | 13 | 10 | 15 | 59 | 60 | −1 | 49 |

Source: La Liga, Soccerway
Rules for classification: 1) Points; 2) Head-to-head points; 3) Head-to-head goal difference; 4) Goal difference; 5) Goals scored; 6) Fair-play points (Note: Head-to-head record is used only after all the matches between the teams in question have been played)

==== Matches ====
Win Draw Loss Fixtures

| 19 August 2017 1 | Sevilla | 1–1 | Espanyol | Seville |
| 22:15 CEST (UTC+02:00) | Lenglet 26'; Banega (yellow card) 84' (red card) 84'; Nolito (yellow card) 90' | Report | Diop (yellow card) 16'; Baptistão 35', (yellow card) 55'; Martín (yellow card) 76'; Da. López (yellow card) 90+1' | Stadium: Ramón Sánchez Pizjuán; Attendance: 30,506; Referee: Alejandro Hernández Hernández |

| 27 August 2017 2 | Espanyol | 0–1 | Leganés | Cornellà de Llobregat |
| 18:15 CEST (UTC+02:00) | Naldo (yellow card) 49'; Granero (yellow card) 52'; Pérez (yellow card) 59' | Report | Mantovani 28'; Eraso (yellow card) 73'; Rico (yellow card) 79'; Gumbau (yellow card) 90' | Stadium: RCDE Stadium; Attendance: 18,383; Referee: Pablo González Fuertes |

| 9 September 2017 3 | Barcelona | 5–0 | Espanyol | Barcelona |
| 20:45 CEST | Busquets (yellow card) 21'; Messi 26', 35', 67'; Piqué 87'; L. Suárez 90' | Report | Da. López (yellow card) 29'; V. Sánchez (yellow card) 60'; Darder (yellow card) 71'; Martín (yellow card) 74'; Diop (yellow card) 84' | Stadium: Camp Nou; Attendance: 72,857; Referee: Jesús Gil Manzano |

| 18 September 2017 4 | Espanyol | 2–1 | Celta Vigo | Cornellà de Llobregat |
| 21:00 CEST (UTC+02:00) | Gerard 10'; Piatti 24'; Fuego (yellow card) 64' | Report | Aspas (yellow card) 48'; Mallo (yellow card) 55'; Sisto 69'; M. Gómez (yellow card) 76'; Cabral (yellow card) 77' | Stadium: RCDE Stadium; Attendance: 15,026; Referee: Javier Alberola Rojas |

| 21 September 2017 5 | Villarreal | 0–0 | Espanyol | Villarreal |
| 20:00 CEST (UTC+02:00) | Bacca (yellow card) 31'; Bakambu (yellow card) 41'; Trigueros (yellow card) 71'; Álvaro (yellow card) 74'; Fornals (yellow card) 85' | Report | V. Sánchez (yellow card) 77'; Fuego (yellow card) 86' | Stadium: La Cerámica; Attendance: 17,071; Referee: José Luis Munuera Montero |

| 24 September 2017 6 | Espanyol | 4–1 | Deportivo La Coruña | Cornellà de Llobregat |
| 12:00 CEST (UTC+02:00) | Baptistão 5'; Arribas 22' (o.g.); Gerard 72' (pen.), 90'; V. Sánchez (yellow card) 75' | Report | Luisinho (yellow card) 19'; Borges 53'; Gama (yellow card) 90+3' | Stadium: RCDE Stadium; Attendance: 19,585; Referee: Ricardo de Burgos Bengoetxea |

| 1 October 2017 7 | Real Madrid | 2–0 | Espanyol | Madrid |
| 20:45 CEST (UTC+02:00) | Isco 30', 71'; Nacho (yellow card) 36'; Casemiro (yellow card) 77' | Report | S. Sánchez (yellow card) 65'; Martín (yellow card) 90' | Stadium: Santiago Bernabéu; Attendance: 71,205; Referee: José González González |

| 13 October 2017 8 | Espanyol | 0–0 | Levante | Cornellà de Llobregat |
| 21:00 CEST (UTC+02:00) | Hermoso (yellow card) 57'; Fuego (yellow card) 68' | Report | Nano (yellow card) 24'; Postigo (yellow card) 39'; Morales (yellow card) 60' | Stadium: RCDE Stadium; Attendance: 19,365; Referee: Alberto Mallenco |

| 23 October 2017 9 | Real Sociedad | 1–1 | Espanyol | San Sebastián |
| 20:00 CEST (UTC+02:00) | Illarramendi 69', (yellow card) 87' (yellow-red card) 90+2'; Rodrigues (yellow card) 74'; Oyarzabal (yellow card) 86'; Rulli (yellow card) 90+3' | Report | Baptistão 9'; Jurado (yellow card) 44'; Darder (yellow card) 64'; Da. López (yellow card) 64'; Martín (yellow card) 81' | Stadium: Anoeta; Attendance: 18,434; Referee: Mario Melero López |

| 30 October 2017 10 | Espanyol | 1–0 | Real Betis | Cornellà de Llobregat |
| 21:00 CEST (UTC+02:00) | Gerard 55'; V. Sánchez (yellow card) 69'; Da. López (yellow card) 72' | Report | Barragán (yellow card) 3'; Amat (yellow card) 51'; Matías Nahuel (yellow card) 76'; Joaquín (yellow card) 82'; Guardado (yellow card) 88' | Stadium: RCDE Stadium; Attendance: 17,545; Referee: Ignacio Iglesias Villanueva |

| 4 November 2017 11 | Alavés | 1–0 | Espanyol | Vitoria-Gasteiz |
| 18:30 CET (UTC+01:00) | Santos 1', (yellow card) 79'; Diéguez (yellow card) 15'; Pedraza (yellow card) 26'; Pina (yellow card) 51'; Ely (yellow card) 58'; Medrán (yellow card) 74'; M. García (yellow card) 77' | Report | Hermoso (yellow card) 21' (yellow-red card) 39' | Stadium: Mendizorrotza; Attendance: 14,785; Referee: Pablo González Fuertes |

| 19 November 2017 12 | Espanyol | 0–2 | Valencia | Cornellà de Llobregat |
| 16:15 CET (UTC+01:00) | | Report | Murillo (yellow card) 29'; Lato (yellow card) 49'; Montoya (yellow card) 49'; Kondogbia 67'; Pereira (yellow card) 78'; Mina 83' | Stadium: RCDE Stadium; Attendance: 24,836; Referee: Alejandro Hernández Hernández |

| 27 November 2017 13 | Espanyol | 1–0 | Getafe | Cornellà de Llobregat |
| 21:00 CET (UTC+01:00) | Fuego (yellow card) 45'; Gerard 55'; García (yellow card) 65'; Darder (yellow card) 90+2' | Report | Djené (yellow card) 21'; Cala (yellow card) 42'; Bergara (yellow card) 59'; Suárez (yellow card) 82'; Molina (yellow card) 89'; Antunes (yellow card) 89' | Stadium: RCDE Stadium; Attendance: 11,659; Referee: Juan Martínez Munuera |

| 3 December 2017 14 | Eibar | 3–1 | Espanyol | Eibar |
| 18:30 CET (UTC+01:00) | Kike 9', (yellow card) 81'; Arbilla (yellow card) 31'; Inui (yellow card) 35'; Alejo 38'; Jordán 69' (pen.) | Report | Gerard (yellow card) 15'; D. López (yellow card) 67'; Enrich 79' (o.g.); Hermoso (yellow card) 89' | Stadium: Ipurua; Attendance: 4,724; Referee: Alberto Undiano Mallenco |

| 11 December 2017 15 | Espanyol | 0–1 | Girona | Cornellà de Llobregat |
| 21:00 CET (UTC+01:00) | Granero (yellow card) 65' | Report | Timor 45+1', (yellow card) 58'; Stuani (yellow card) 59'; Pons (yellow card) 79' | Stadium: RCDE Stadium; Attendance: 13,846; Referee: José González González |

| 17 December 2017 16 | Las Palmas | 2–2 | Espanyol | Las Palmas |
| 18:30 CET (UTC+01:00) | Lemos (yellow card) 20'; Tana (yellow card) 39'; Castellano (yellow card) 58'; Rémy 80'; Calleri 89' | Report | Gerard 19', 41', (yellow card) 34'; Sánchez (yellow card) 37'; Granero (yellow card) 78' | Stadium: Gran Canaria; Attendance: 13,976; Referee: José María Sánchez Martínez |

| 22 December 2017 17 | Espanyol | 1–0 | Atlético Madrid | Cornellà de Llobregat |
| 21:30 CET (UTC+01:00) | J. López (yellow card) 82'; García 88'; Pau (yellow card) 90+3' | Report | Saúl (yellow card) 51'; Koke (yellow card) 73'; Gabi (yellow card) 83'; Vrsaljko (yellow card) 89'; Fernández (yellow card) 90+4' | Stadium: RCDE Stadium; Attendance: 19,327; Referee: Mario Melero López |

| 8 January 2018 18 | Málaga | 0–1 | Espanyol | Málaga |
| 21:00 CET (UTC+01:00) | Recio (yellow card) 7'; González (yellow card) 78' | Report | D. López (yellow card) 3'; Darder 6'; Hermoso (yellow card) 32'; Fuego (yellow card) 81' | Stadium: La Rosaleda; Attendance: 12,357; Referee: Antonio Mateu Lahoz |

| 14 January 2018 19 | Espanyol | 1–1 | Athletic Bilbao | Cornellà de Llobregat |
| 18:30 CET (UTC+01:00) | Gerard 29'; Hermoso (yellow card) 60'; Martín (yellow card) 78' | Report | Williams 35'; Iturraspe (yellow card) 68'; Saborit (yellow card) 76'; García (yellow card) 80'; Merino (yellow card) 88' | Stadium: RCDE Stadium; Attendance: 19,827; Referee: Daniel Trujillo Suárez |

| 20 January 2018 20 | Espanyol | 0–3 | Sevilla | Cornellà de Llobregat |
| 13:00 CET (UTC+01:00) | Fuego (yellow card) 32'; Baptistão (yellow card) 41'; J. López (yellow card) 54'; Sánchez (yellow card) 85' | Report | Vázquez 15'; Sarabia 34'; Mercado (yellow card) 71'; Escudero (yellow card) 83'; Muriel 90' | Stadium: RCDE Stadium; Attendance: 19,110; Referee: Alberto Undiano Mallenco |

| 28 January 2018 21 | Leganés | 3–2 | Espanyol | Leganés |
| 12:00 CET (UTC+01:00) | Hermoso 11', 82' (o.g.); Guerrero (yellow card) 62', (goal) 69'; Bustinza (yellow card) 90+3' | Report | Granero (yellow card) 40'; Navarro 49'; Duarte (yellow card) 74'; Darder (yellow card) 86'; Hermoso 88'; Baptistão (yellow card) 90+3' | Stadium: Butarque; Attendance: 9,467; Referee: Juan Martínez Munuera |

| 4 February 2018 22 | Espanyol | 1–1 | Barcelona | Cornellà de Llobregat |
| 16:15 CET (UTC+01:00) | Naldo (yellow card) 40'; Gerard 66', (yellow card) 84'; Navarro (yellow card) 70'; García (yellow card) 79'; Granero (yellow card) 85' | Report | Busquets (yellow card) 29'; Umtiti (yellow card) 52'; Piqué 82'; Alba (yellow card) 86' | Stadium: RCDE Stadium; Attendance: 23,287; Referee: Jesús Gil Manzano |

| 11 February 2018 23 | Celta Vigo | 2–2 | Espanyol | Vigo |
| 18:30 CET (UTC+01:00) | Maxi Gómez 32', 80', (yellow card) 90+2'; P. Hernández (yellow card) 78'; Hugo Mallo (yellow card) 85' | Report | Baptistão 10'; Víctor S. (yellow card) 45'; Diego López (yellow card) 54'; M. Navarro (yellow card) 83'; Gerard 87'; S. García (yellow card) 90' | Stadium: Balaídos; Attendance: 15,750; Referee: José Luis González González |

| 18 February 2018 24 | Espanyol | 1–1 | Villarreal | Cornellà de Llobregat |
| 18:30 CET (UTC+01:00) | S. García (yellow card) 35'; Granero 85' | Report | Víctor Ruiz (yellow card) 7'; Rodri 25'; Mario Gaspar (yellow card) 44'; Álvaro (yellow card) 63'; Javi Fuego (yellow card) 65'; Rodri (yellow card) 76'; Bacca (yellow card) 85'; Rukavina (yellow card) 86' | Stadium: RCDE Stadium; Attendance: 19,308; Referee: José Luis Munuera Montero |

| 23 February 2018 25 | Deportivo La Coruña | 0–0 | Espanyol | A Coruña |
| 21:00 CET (UTC+01:00) | Andone (yellow card) 17'; P. Mosquera (yellow card) 33'; Fabian Schär (yellow card) 60'; Fede Cartabia (yellow card) 62'; Bóveda (yellow card) 83' | Report | Víctor S. (yellow card) 42' | Stadium: Riazor |

| 27 February 2018 26 | Espanyol | 1–0 | Real Madrid | Cornellà de Llobregat |
| 20:00 CET (UTC+01:00) | Aarón Martín (yellow card) 81'; Gerard 90+3' | Report | Bale (yellow card) 37' | Stadium: RCDE Stadium; Attendance: 19,805; Referee: José María Sánchez Martínez |

| 4 March 2018 27 | Levante | 1–1 | Espanyol | Valencia |
| 12:00 CET (UTC+01:00) | José Luis Morales 55' | Report | Gerard (yellow card) 13'; Darder (yellow card) 30'; M. Navarro (yellow card) 54'; Léo Baptistão 90+1' | Stadium: Ciutat de València; Attendance: 16,854; Referee: Alberola Rojas |

| 11 March 2018 28 | Espanyol | 2–1 | Real Sociedad | Cornellà de Llobregat |
| --:-- CET (UTC+01:00) | Léo Baptistão 51'; Gerard 72' | Report | Llorente R. (yellow card) 14'; Willian José 41'; de la Bella (yellow card) 87' | Stadium: RCDE Stadium; Attendance: 19,932; Referee: Antonio Mateu Lahoz |

| 18 March 2018 29 | Real Betis | 3–0 | Espanyol | Seville |
| --:-- CEST (UTC+02:00) | Junior Firpo 34'; Ryad Boudebouz 56'; Francis 69', (yellow card) 81' | Report | Víctor S. (yellow card) 36'; Darder (yellow card) 89'; Dídac (yellow card) 90+3' | Stadium: Benito Villamarín; Attendance: 31,311; Referee: Ricardo de Burgos Bengoetxea |

| 1 April 2018 30 | Espanyol | 0–0 | Alavés | Cornellà de Llobregat |
| --:-- CEST (UTC+02:00) | Víctor S. (yellow card) 23'; Carlos Sánchez (yellow card) 77'; Pau López (yellow card) 90+3' | Report | Guidetti (yellow card) 69'; Hernán Pérez (yellow card) 88' | Stadium: RCDE Stadium; Attendance: 15,100; Referee: Iglesias Villanueva |

| 8 April 2018 31 | Valencia | 1–0 | Espanyol | Valencia |
| --:-- CEST (UTC+02:00) | Rodrigo 7'; Carlos Soler (yellow card) 53'; Ezequiel Garay (yellow card) 54'; Kondogbia (yellow card) 90+2' | Report | Carlos Sánchez (yellow card) 15'; Léo Baptistão (yellow card) 68' | Stadium: Mestalla; Attendance: 36,370; Referee: Gil Manzano |

| 15 April 2018 32 | Getafe | 1–0 | Espanyol | Getafe |
| --:-- CEST (UTC+02:00) | Ángel (yellow card) 40'; Damián Suárez 53'; Mathieu Flamini (yellow card) 58' (yellow-red card) 61'; Amath (yellow card) 86'; Jorge Molina (yellow card) 90+1'; Sergio Mora (yellow card) 90+2' | Report | Darder (yellow card) 52'; David López (yellow card) 56' | Stadium: Coliseum Alfonso Pérez; Attendance: 10,363; Referee: Melero López |

| 18 April 2018 33 | Espanyol | 0–1 | Eibar | Cornellà de Llobregat |
| --:-- CEST (UTC+02:00) | Hermoso (yellow card) 33'; Javi López (yellow card) 51'; Víctor S. (yellow card) 56' | Report | David Lombán 32'; Capa (yellow card) 57'; Diop (yellow card) 90+4' | Stadium: RCDE Stadium; Attendance: 11,862; Referee: Hernández Hernández |

| 22 April 2018 34 | Girona | 0–2 | Espanyol | Girona |
| --:-- CEST (UTC+02:00) | Aday (yellow card) 73' | Report | Carlos Sánchez (yellow card) 38'; Gerard 43', 55'; Víctor S. (yellow card) 48' | Stadium: Montilivi |

| 29 April 2018 35 | Espanyol | 1–1 | Las Palmas | Cornellà de Llobregat |
| --:-- CEST (UTC+02:00) | Víctor S. (yellow card) 22'; Dídac (yellow card) 25'; Gerard 76' | Report | Calleri (yellow card) 27', (goal) 29' (pen.); Etebo (yellow card) 35'; Vicente Gómez (yellow card) 79'; Dani Castellano (yellow card) 90+2' | Stadium: RCDE Stadium; Attendance: 13,375; Referee: González Fuertes |

| 6 May 2018 36 | Atlético Madrid | 0–2 | Espanyol | Madrid |
| --:-- CEST (UTC+02:00) | Giménez (yellow card) 90+1' | Report | Melendo 53', (yellow card) 74'; Pau López (yellow card) 61'; Dídac (yellow card) 61'; Léo Baptistão 77' | Stadium: Wanda Metropolitano; Attendance: 49,834; Referee: José Luis Munuera Montero |

| 13 May 2018 37 | Espanyol | 4–1 | Málaga | Cornellà de Llobregat |
| 16:15 CEST (UTC+02:00) | Gerard 8'; S. García 27'; Léo Baptistão 30'; Piatti 79' (pen.) | Report | Adrián 39' (pen.); Miquel (yellow card) 67' | Stadium: RCDE Stadium; Attendance: 15,004; Referee: Juan Martínez Munuera |

| 20 May 2018 38 | Athletic Bilbao | 0–1 | Espanyol | Bilbao |
| 16:15 CEST (UTC+02:00) | | Report | David López 9'; Javi López (yellow card) 81' | Stadium: San Mamés; Attendance: 28,492; Referee: Fernández Borbalán |

=== Copa del Rey ===
==== Round of 32 ====
| 26 October 2017 | Tenerife | 0–0 | Espanyol | Santa Cruz de Tenerife |
| 21:30 CEST (UTC+02:00) | | Report | | Stadium: Heliodoro Rodríguez López; Attendance: 13,925; Referee: José González González |

| 30 November 2017 | Espanyol | 3–2 (3–2 agg.) | Tenerife | Cornellà de Llobregat |
| 19:30 CEST (UTC+02:00) | Gerard (yellow card) 35', (goal) 36' (pen.); D. López (yellow card) 40'; Granero 56'; Vilà (yellow card) 79'; García 90+1' | Report | Acosta 9'; Juan Carlos 90+3' | Stadium: RCDE Stadium; Attendance: 8,130; Referee: Ignacio Iglesias Villanueva |

==== Round of 16 ====
| 4 January 2018 | Espanyol | 1–2 | Levante | Cornellà de Llobregat |
| 21:00 CET (UTC+01:00) | Gerard 28'; Piatti (yellow card) 53'; Darder (yellow card) 85' | Report | Cabaco (yellow card) 29'; Morales 38' (pen.); Bardhi (yellow card) 53'; Lerma (yellow card) 70'; Ivi 74' | Stadium: RCDE Stadium; Attendance: 12,602; Referee: David Fernández Borbalán |

| 9 January 2018 | Levante | 0–2 (2–3 agg.) | Espanyol | Valencia |
| 19:30 CET (UTC+01:00) | Lukić (yellow card) 42'; Boateng (yellow card) 61' | Report | Baptistão 14'; Hermoso (yellow card) 21'; Gerard 34' | Stadium: Ciutat de València; Attendance: 9,978; Referee: Jesús Gil Manzano |

==== Quarter-finals ====
| 17 January 2018 First leg | Espanyol | 1–0 | Barcelona | Cornellà de Llobregat |
| 21:00 CET (UTC+01:00) | Martín (yellow card) 43'; Gerard (yellow card) 61'; Sánchez (yellow card) 86'; Melendo 88'; D. López (yellow card) 90' | Report | Aleñá (yellow card) 45+1'; Alba (yellow card) 55'; Rakitić (yellow card) 82'; Vermaelen (yellow card) 84'; L. Suárez (yellow card) 90+1' | Stadium: RCDE Stadium; Attendance: 23,323; Referee: Ricardo de Burgos Bengoetxea |

| 25 January 2018 Second leg | Barcelona | 2–0 (2–1 agg.) | Espanyol | Barcelona |
| 21:30 CET (UTC+01:00) | L. Suárez (yellow card) 8', (goal) 9'; Messi 25', (yellow card) 27'; Alba (yellow card) 38'; Paulinho (yellow card) 82' | Report | Hermoso (yellow card) 19'; Granero (yellow card) 60'; García (yellow card) 72'; Naldo (yellow card) 77' | Stadium: Camp Nou; Attendance: 79,774; Referee: Antonio Mateu Lahoz |

== Statistics ==
=== Appearances and goals ===
Last updated on 20 May 2018.

| No. | Pos | Nat | Player | Total | | La Liga | | Copa del Rey | |
| No. | Pos | Nat | Player | Apps | Goals | Apps | Goals | Apps | Goals |
Goalkeepers
| 1 | GK | (Spain) ESP | Pau | 30 | 0 | 28+1 | 0 | 1 | 0 |
| 13 | GK | (Spain) ESP | Diego López | 15 | 0 | 10 | 0 | 5 | 0 |
| 35 | GK | (Spain) ESP | Adrián López | 0 | 0 | 0 | 0 | 0 | 0 |
Defenders
| 2 | DF | (Spain) ESP | Marc Navarro | 24 | 1 | 10+9 | 1 | 4+1 | 0 |
| 3 | DF | (Spain) ESP | Aarón Martín | 35 | 0 | 31+1 | 0 | 2+1 | 0 |
| 5 | DF | (Brazil) BRA | Naldo | 17 | 0 | 10+1 | 0 | 6 | 0 |
| 6 | DF | (Costa Rica) CRC | Óscar Duarte | 13 | 0 | 11 | 0 | 2 | 0 |
| 12 | DF | (Spain) ESP | Dídac Vilà | 19 | 0 | 7+7 | 0 | 4+1 | 0 |
| 16 | DF | (Spain) ESP | Javi López | 15 | 0 | 12+2 | 0 | 1 | 0 |
| 22 | DF | (Spain) ESP | Mario Hermoso | 24 | 1 | 22 | 1 | 2 | 0 |
| 24 | DF | (Spain) ESP | Sergio Sánchez | 3 | 0 | 1+1 | 0 | 0+1 | 0 |
Midfielders
| 4 | MF | (Spain) ESP | Víctor Sánchez | 33 | 0 | 29+1 | 0 | 3 | 0 |
| 8 | MF | (Colombia) COL | Carlos Sánchez | 14 | 0 | 13+1 | 0 | 0 | 0 |
| 10 | MF | (Spain) ESP | José Manuel Jurado | 31 | 0 | 20+9 | 0 | 2 | 0 |
| 14 | MF | (Spain) ESP | Óscar Melendo | 23 | 2 | 6+12 | 1 | 1+4 | 1 |
| 15 | MF | (Spain) ESP | David López | 43 | 1 | 37 | 1 | 6 | 0 |
| 19 | MF | (Argentina) ARG | Pablo Piatti | 31 | 2 | 22+8 | 2 | 1 | 0 |
| 21 | MF | (Spain) ESP | Marc Roca | 9 | 0 | 2+6 | 0 | 1 | 0 |
| 23 | MF | (Spain) ESP | Esteban Granero | 31 | 2 | 11+14 | 1 | 6 | 1 |
| 25 | MF | (Spain) ESP | Sergi Darder | 40 | 1 | 32+3 | 1 | 2+3 | 0 |
Forwards
| 7 | FW | (Spain) ESP | Gerard | 44 | 19 | 38 | 16 | 5+1 | 3 |
| 9 | FW | (Spain) ESP | Sergio García | 38 | 3 | 14+19 | 2 | 2+3 | 1 |
| 11 | FW | (Brazil) BRA | Léo Baptistão | 40 | 9 | 31+5 | 8 | 1+3 | 1 |
Players who have made an appearance or had a squad number this season but have left the club
| 8 | FW | (Spain) ESP | Álvaro Vázquez | 2 | 0 | 0 | 0 | 2 | 0 |
| 17 | MF | (Paraguay) PAR | Hernán Pérez | 5 | 0 | 1+3 | 0 | 1 | 0 |
| 18 | MF | (Spain) ESP | Javi Fuego | 20 | 0 | 17 | 0 | 3 | 0 |
| 20 | MF | (Cameroon) CMR | Pape Diop | 7 | 0 | 3+2 | 0 | 2 | 0 |

=== Cards ===
Accounts for all competitions. Last updated on 19 December 2017.

| No. | Pos. | Name | Yellow card | Red card |
| 3 | DF | (Spain) Aarón Martín | 4 | 0 |
| 4 | MF | (Spain) Víctor Sánchez | 5 | 0 |
| 5 | DF | (Brazil) Naldo | 1 | 0 |
| 7 | FW | (Spain) Gerard | 2 | 0 |
| 9 | FW | (Spain) Sergio García | 1 | 0 |
| 10 | MF | (Spain) José Manuel Jurado | 1 | 0 |
| 11 | FW | (Brazil) Léo Baptistão | 1 | 0 |
| 12 | DF | (Spain) Dídac Vilà | 1 | 0 |
| 15 | MF | (Spain) David López | 6 | 0 |
| 17 | MF | (Paraguay) Hernán Pérez | 1 | 0 |
| 18 | MF | (Spain) Javi Fuego | 4 | 0 |
| 20 | MF | (Cameroon) Pape Diop | 3 | 0 |
| 22 | DF | (Spain) Mario Hermoso | 3 | 1 |
| 23 | MF | (Spain) Esteban Granero | 3 | 0 |
| 24 | DF | (Spain) Sergio Sánchez | 1 | 0 |
| 25 | MF | (Spain) Sergi Darder | 3 | 0 |

=== Clean sheets ===
Last updated on 19 December 2017.

| Number | Nation | Name | Matches Played | La Liga | Copa del Rey | Total |
|---|---|---|---|---|---|---|
| 1 | (Spain) | Pau | 16 | 4 | 0 | 4 |
| 13 | (Spain) | Diego López | 2 | 0 | 1 | 1 |
| 35 | (Spain) | Adrià López Garrote | 0 | 0 | 0 | 0 |
| TOTALS | | | | 4 | 1 | 5 |
