= Diego López (Spanish footballer, born 1981) =

Spanish footballer

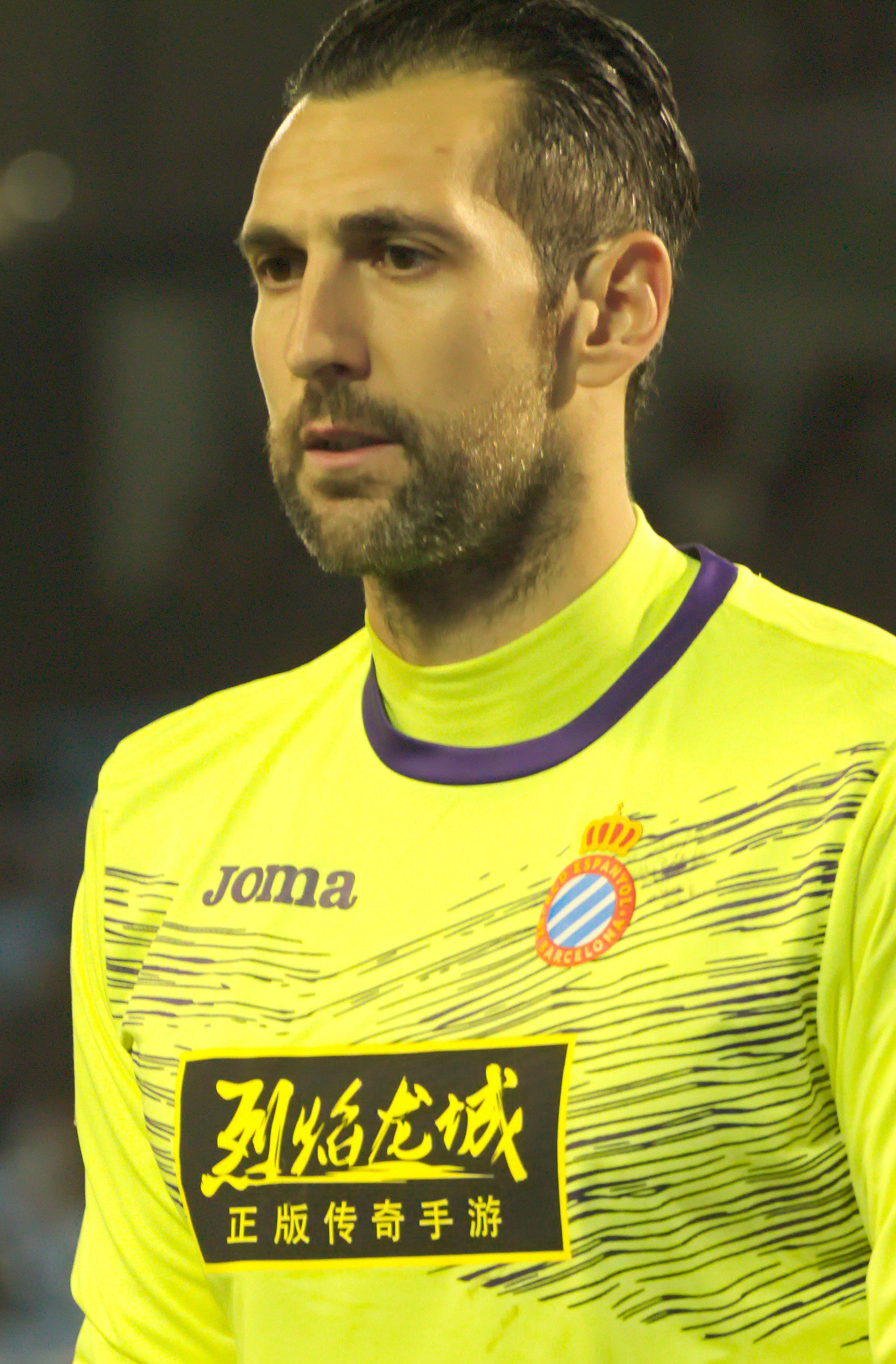
- López playing for Espanyol in 2017

Personal information
- Full name: Diego López Rodríguez
- Date of birth: 3 November 1981 (age 44)
- Place of birth: Paradela, Spain
- Height: 1.96 m (6 ft 5 in)
- Position: Goalkeeper

Youth career
- 1990–1994: Sarriana
- 1994–1999: Lugo

Senior career*
| Years | Team | Apps | (Gls) |
| 1999–2000 | Lugo | 2 | (0) |
| 2000–2003 | Real Madrid C | 62 | (0) |
| 2001–2002 | → Alcorcón (loan) | 0 | (0) |
| 2003–2005 | Real Madrid B | 41 | (0) |
| 2005–2007 | Real Madrid | 2 | (0) |
| 2007–2012 | Villarreal | 171 | (0) |
| 2012–2013 | Sevilla | 8 | (0) |
| 2013–2014 | Real Madrid | 52 | (0) |
| 2014–2017 | AC Milan | 36 | (0) |
| 2016–2017 | → Espanyol (loan) | 35 | (0) |
| 2017–2022 | Espanyol | 160 | (0) |
| 2022–2023 | Rayo Vallecano | 2 | (0) |
| Total | | 571 | (0) |

International career
| 2001 | Spain U18 | 1 | (0) |
| 2009 | Spain | 1 | (0) |
| 2005–2007 | Galicia | 3 | (0) |
Medal record
Men's football
Representing Spain
FIFA Confederations Cup
| Third place | 2009 South Africa |
- * Club domestic league appearances and goals

Diego López Rodríguez (Spanish pronunciation: [ˈdjeɣo ˈlopeθ]; born 3 November 1981) is a Spanish former professional footballer who played as a goalkeeper.

After spending seven years with Real Madrid, playing for its various teams, he made a name for himself in La Liga with Villarreal, appearing in 230 official games over the course of five seasons. In 2013, following a brief spell with Sevilla, he returned to Real Madrid.

López represented Spain at the 2009 Confederations Cup.

== Club career ==
=== Real Madrid ===
López was born in Paradela, Lugo, Galicia. A youth graduate from hometown's CD Lugo he signed with Real Madrid at age 18 and, after a loan at another side from the capital region, AD Alcorcón, he eventually moved up to Real's B team, starting in his second season, which ended in promotion to the Segunda División.

López served as first-team backup to Iker Casillas in the following two La Liga campaigns: in the closing stages of 2005–06 he appeared in back-to-back away wins, against CA Osasuna (as Casillas was sent off) and Racing de Santander, adding a UEFA Champions League group stage game at Olympiakos FC, a 2–1 defeat.

=== Villarreal ===
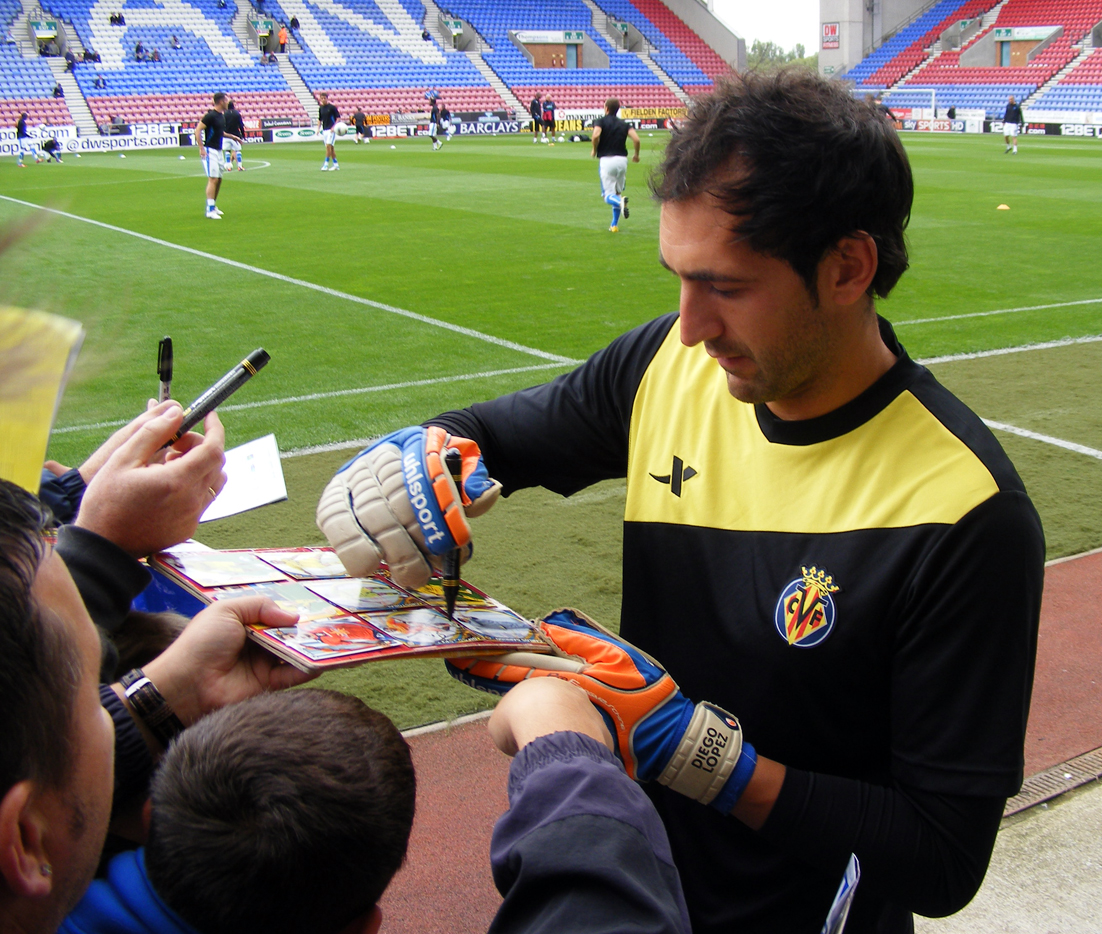
López signing autographs with Villarreal in 2011

In late June 2007, López signed with Villarreal CF for a reported fee of €6 million, and started the season as second choice to Uruguayan Sebastián Viera but, after a string of fine performances – he played in the Copa del Rey and the UEFA Cup – he was picked for the first team, finishing the season with 21 matches.

López was ever-present in 2008–09, playing every minute and helping Villarreal finish fifth in the league. The following campaign was similar, but the team could only finish seventh, out of the European places. However, as fifth-placed RCD Mallorca were expelled from European competition due to bankruptcy, the Valencians took their place in the qualifying rounds of the UEFA Europa League.

López featured in every league game except one in 2011–12, being given his marching orders against Sevilla FC in a 2–2 home draw in the second round. The Yellow Submarine were eventually relegated after twelve years, with the player conceding 50 goals. His 121 consecutive top-flight games set a 21st-century record in the league, which was broken by Iñaki Williams in 2019.

=== Sevilla ===
On 22 May 2012, López joined Sevilla on a five-year contract for a reported fee of €3.5 million. He split first-choice status with Andrés Palop during his spell.

=== Return to Real Madrid ===
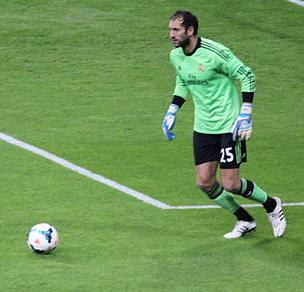
López in action for Real Madrid in 2013

On 25 January 2013, López returned to Real Madrid after Casillas suffered a hand injury which ruled him out for 12 weeks, signing for €3.5 million until June 2017. Shortly upon arriving, he stated he had always dreamed of coming back to the club.

López played his first game in his second spell on 30 January 2013, in a 1–1 home draw against FC Barcelona in the Spanish Cup semi-finals. On 5 March, he made a string of saves as Real beat Manchester United 2–1 at Old Trafford to qualify for the last-eight in the Champions League (3–2 on aggregate); after the match, coach José Mourinho said: "Diego López was the best player in my team". He retained his position until the end of the season, even though Casillas had already returned to full fitness.

López retained his number one position at the start of the following campaign, when Carlo Ancelotti had replaced Mourinho. Casillas was played in both the Champions League and the domestic cup, however.

=== AC Milan ===
On 13 August 2014, Real Madrid and AC Milan reached an agreement over the transfer of López. He made his competitive debut on 31 August in the first match of the new season in Serie A, saving a late penalty from Antonio Candreva in a 3–1 win over SS Lazio. On 14 September he suffered a right thigh injury against Parma FC, being sidelined for almost a month.

After three matches without a win early into the 2015–16 campaign, manager Siniša Mihajlović dropped López in favour of 16-year-old Gianluigi Donnarumma.

=== Espanyol ===
On 31 August 2016, López joined RCD Espanyol on a season-long loan deal. He was elected La Liga Player of the Month in November, after not conceding in any of the three matches.

López's move was made permanent on 23 May 2017, on a three-year deal with a buyout clause of €50 million. He was overtaken by Pau López still under manager Quique Sánchez Flores, but after the latter moved to Real Betis, he regained his starting role and was the only player to feature in all 38 games of 2018–19.

In August 2020, after Espanyol's relegation, the nearly 39-year-old López signed for another season. In that year, he recorded the best figures for his position with 25 goals conceded in 40 matches, as the Pericos won the title.

=== Rayo Vallecano ===
López signed a one-year contract with Rayo Vallecano on 2 July 2022, as a free agent. In December 2023, having been unemployed for six months, he announced his retirement aged 42.

== International career ==
=== Spain ===
As third goalkeeper, López was first selected for Spain for two 2010 FIFA World Cup qualifiers in late March/early April 2009, both against Turkey. He was named in the squad by manager Vicente del Bosque for the 2009 FIFA Confederations Cup in South Africa behind Casillas and Pepe Reina, and did not play any matches there.

López earned his only cap on 12 August 2009, playing the last 30 minutes of a 3–2 friendly win against Macedonia, replacing Reina and not conceding any goals.

=== Galicia ===
López made three appearances for the unofficial Galicia team, starting with their first game for 75 years on 29 December 2005. They won 3–2 against Uruguay in Santiago de Compostela.

== Style of play ==
López was a well-rounded goalkeeper, with a large physique, strong leadership qualities and good handling, which facilitated him in coming out to claim crosses. He possessed quick reactions, concentration and a positional sense, also being an effective shot-stopper.

López was known in particular for his ball control, distribution and speed when rushing off his line to anticipate opponents.

== Personal life ==
López married Iria Otero on 11 June 2011, fathering three children.

== Career statistics ==
Appearances and goals by club, season and competition
| Club | Season | League | | | Cup | | Continental (Note: Includes UEFA Champions League and UEFA Cup/UEFA Europa League) | | Other (Note: Includes Supercopa de España, UEFA Super Cup and FIFA Club World Cup) | | Total | |
| Club | Season | Division | Apps | Goals | Apps | Goals | Apps | Goals | Apps | Goals | Apps | Goals |
|---|---|---|---|---|---|---|---|---|---|---|---|---|
| Lugo | 1999–2000 | Segunda División B | 2 | 0 | — | | — | | — | | 2 | 0 |
| Real Madrid C | 2000–01 | Tercera División | 38 | 0 | — | | — | | — | | 38 | 0 |
| Real Madrid C | 2002–03 | Tercera División | 24 | 0 | — | | — | | — | | 24 | 0 |
| Real Madrid C | Total | | 62 | 0 | — | | — | | — | | 62 | 0 |
| Alcorcón (loan) | 2001–02 | Segunda División B | 0 | 0 | — | | — | | — | | 0 | 0 |
| Real Madrid B | 2003–04 | Segunda División B | 6 | 0 | — | | — | | — | | 6 | 0 |
| Real Madrid B | 2004–05 | Segunda División B | 35 | 0 | — | | — | | — | | 35 | 0 |
| Real Madrid B | Total | | 41 | 0 | — | | — | | — | | 41 | 0 |
| Real Madrid | 2003–04 | La Liga | 0 | 0 | 0 | 0 | 0 | 0 | 0 | 0 | 0 | 0 |
| Real Madrid | 2004–05 | La Liga | 0 | 0 | 0 | 0 | 0 | 0 | — | | 0 | 0 |
| Real Madrid | 2005–06 | La Liga | 2 | 0 | 3 | 0 | 1 | 0 | — | | 6 | 0 |
| Real Madrid | 2006–07 | La Liga | 0 | 0 | 4 | 0 | 1 | 0 | — | | 5 | 0 |
| Real Madrid | Total | | 2 | 0 | 7 | 0 | 2 | 0 | 0 | 0 | 11 | 0 |
| Villarreal | 2007–08 | La Liga | 20 | 0 | 6 | 0 | 8 | 0 | — | | 34 | 0 |
| Villarreal | 2008–09 | La Liga | 38 | 0 | 0 | 0 | 9 | 0 | — | | 47 | 0 |
| Villarreal | 2009–10 | La Liga | 38 | 0 | 2 | 0 | 9 | 0 | — | | 49 | 0 |
| Villarreal | 2010–11 | La Liga | 38 | 0 | 2 | 0 | 15 | 0 | — | | 55 | 0 |
| Villarreal | 2011–12 | La Liga | 37 | 0 | 0 | 0 | 8 | 0 | — | | 45 | 0 |
| Villarreal | Total | | 171 | 0 | 10 | 0 | 49 | 0 | — | | 230 | 0 |
| Sevilla | 2012–13 | La Liga | 8 | 0 | 3 | 0 | 0 | 0 | 0 | 0 | 11 | 0 |
| Real Madrid | 2012–13 | La Liga | 16 | 0 | 3 | 0 | 6 | 0 | — | | 25 | 0 |
| Real Madrid | 2013–14 | La Liga | 36 | 0 | 0 | 0 | 1 | 0 | — | | 37 | 0 |
| Real Madrid | Total | | 52 | 0 | 3 | 0 | 7 | 0 | — | | 62 | 0 |
| AC Milan | 2014–15 | Serie A | 28 | 0 | 0 | 0 | — | | — | | 28 | 0 |
| AC Milan | 2015–16 | Serie A | 8 | 0 | 1 | 0 | — | | — | | 9 | 0 |
| AC Milan | Total | | 36 | 0 | 1 | 0 | — | | — | | 37 | 0 |
| Espanyol (loan) | 2016–17 | La Liga | 35 | 0 | 0 | 0 | — | | — | | 35 | 0 |
| Espanyol | 2017–18 | La Liga | 10 | 0 | 5 | 0 | — | | — | | 15 | 0 |
| Espanyol | 2018–19 | La Liga | 38 | 0 | 0 | 0 | — | | — | | 38 | 0 |
| Espanyol | 2019–20 | La Liga | 36 | 0 | 0 | 0 | 11 | 0 | — | | 47 | 0 |
| Espanyol | 2020–21 | Segunda División | 40 | 0 | 0 | 0 | — | | — | | 40 | 0 |
| Espanyol | 2021–22 | La Liga | 36 | 0 | 2 | 0 | — | | — | | 38 | 0 |
| Espanyol | Total | | 195 | 0 | 7 | 0 | 11 | 0 | — | | 213 | 0 |
| Rayo Vallecano | 2022–23 | La Liga | 2 | 0 | 3 | 0 | — | | — | | 5 | 0 |
| Career total | | | 571 | 0 | 34 | 0 | 69 | 0 | 0 | 0 | 674 | 0 |

== Honours ==
Real Madrid

- Copa del Rey: 2013–14; runner-up 2012–13
- UEFA Champions League: 2013–14

Espanyol

- Segunda División: 2020–21

Spain

- FIFA Confederations Cup third place: 2009

Individual

- La Liga Player of the Month: November 2016
