= Álvaro Vázquez =

Spanish footballer (born 1991)

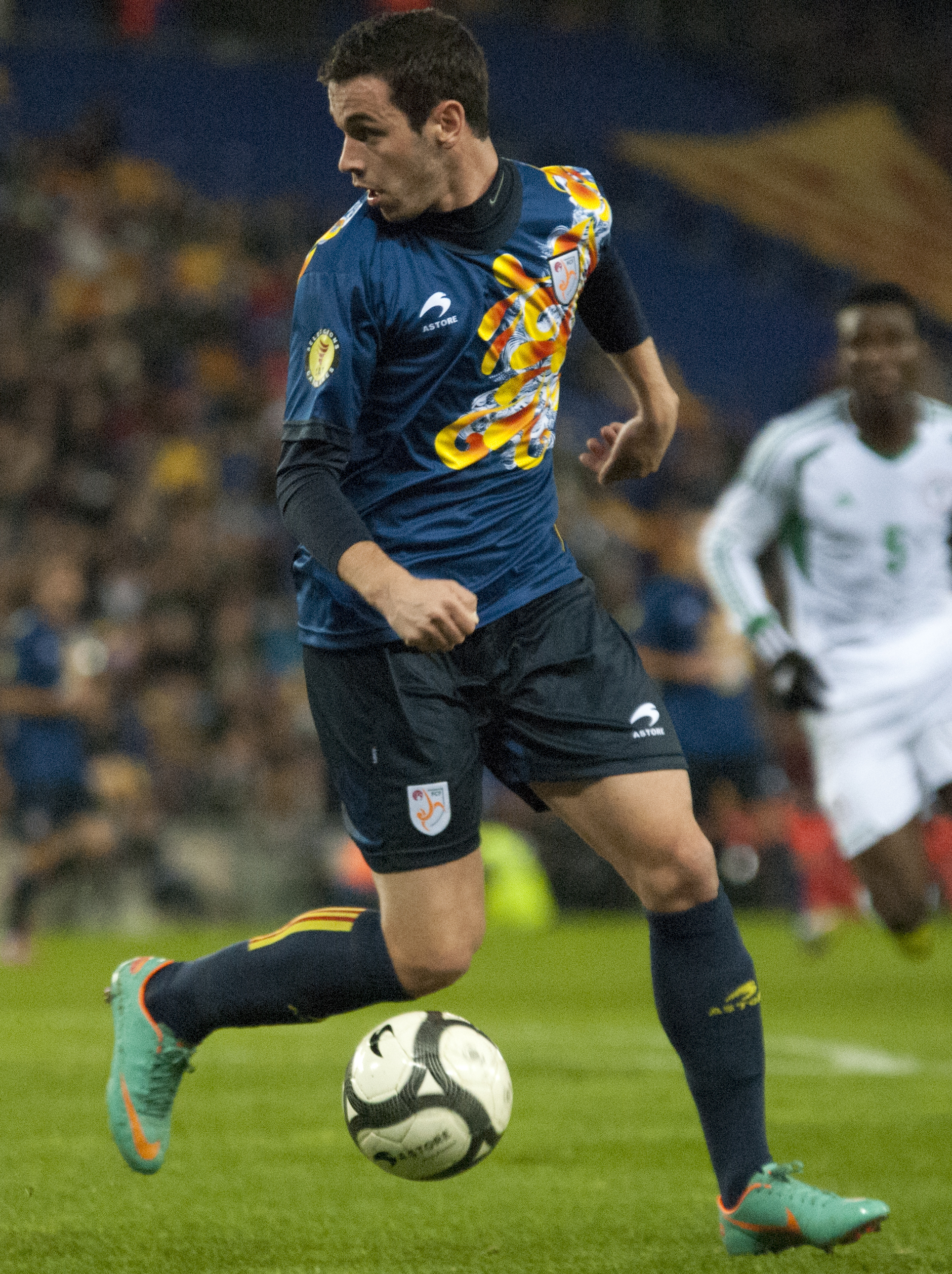
- Vázquez playing for Catalonia in 2013

Personal information
- Full name: Álvaro Vázquez García
- Date of birth: 27 April 1991 (age 35)
- Place of birth: Barcelona, Spain
- Height: 1.82 m (6 ft 0 in)
- Position: Striker

Youth career
- 1997–2000: Trajana
- 2000–2005: Damm
- 2005–2009: Espanyol

Senior career*
Years	Team	Apps	(Gls)
2009–2010	Espanyol B	22	(11)
2010–2012	Espanyol	60	(10)
2012–2016	Getafe	86	(16)
2013–2014	→ Swansea City (loan)	12	(0)
2016–2019	Espanyol	10	(0)
2018	→ Gimnàstic (loan)	18	(6)
2018–2019	→ Zaragoza (loan)	32	(10)
2019–2021	Sporting Gijón	53	(6)
2021	→ Sabadell (loan)	9	(0)
2021–2022	Kerala Blasters	23	(8)
2022–2023	Goa	17	(1)
2023	Ponferradina	7	(0)
2024	Linares Deportivo	16	(4)
2024–2025	Badalona	26	(6)
2025–2026	Arenas Getxo	27	(5)

International career
2011	Spain U20	7	(5)
2011–2013	Spain U21	14	(7)
2012	Spain U23	3	(2)
2010–2016	Catalonia	6	(0)
- * Club domestic league appearances and goals as of 26 July 2026

Álvaro Vázquez García (born 27 April 1991) is a Spanish professional footballer who plays as a striker.

== Club career ==
=== Spain and Swansea City ===
Born in Barcelona, Catalonia, Vázquez spent most of his life in Badalona. He joined RCD Espanyol's youth system in 2005 at the age of 14, and four years later he made his senior debut, appearing with the reserves in the Segunda División B and suffering relegation.

Vázquez made his first-team – and La Liga – debut on 21 September 2010, coming on as a substitute for Sergio García midway through the second half of a 3–0 away loss to Real Madrid. Only five days later, he scored the game's only goal in a home fixture against CA Osasuna, and remained with the main squad for the rest of the season, mainly acting as backup to Dani Osvaldo.

After Osvaldo departed for AS Roma in summer 2011, Vázquez was made starter by manager Mauricio Pochettino. In January 2012, over only four days, he scored four goals in two games: first, he equalised through a header in the last minutes of the local derby against FC Barcelona (1–1 home draw), then added a hat-trick to help defeat Córdoba CF in the round of 16 of the Copa del Rey (4–2 home win, 5–4 on aggregate).

After spending the 2012–13 campaign with fellow league side Getafe CF, Vázquez became coach Michael Laudrup's eighth Spanish signing for his Swansea City team on 2 September 2013, with the loan move being subject to international clearance. He made his Premier League debut on the 22nd in a 2–0 away victory over Crystal Palace, setting up Nathan Dyer for the second goal.

Vázquez returned to his first club Espanyol on 31 August 2016 after agreeing to a four-year contract. On 11 January 2018, after being rarely used, he was loaned to Gimnàstic de Tarragona of Segunda División for six months.

On 23 August 2018, Vázquez joined fellow second-division team Real Zaragoza on a one-year loan. Upon returning, he terminated his contract with Espanyol on 18 June 2019 and signed a three-year deal with Sporting de Gijón on 10 July.

Vázquez moved to second-tier CE Sabadell FC on 12 January 2021, on loan for the remainder of the season.

=== Kerala Blasters ===
On 30 August 2021, Vázquez signed a one-year contract with Kerala Blasters FC. He made his debut in the Indian Super League on 19 November, losing 4–2 at ATK Mohun Bagan FC. He scored his first goal for the club on 5 December in the 2–1 home defeat of Odisha FC, repeating the feat the following week against East Bengal FC (1–1) and also having a goal disallowed early on. He scored for the third consecutive match on 19 December, doubling the lead against defending champions Mumbai City FC in an eventual 3–0 win; he was voted player of the match for his performance in the latter.

On 4 February 2022, Vázquez netted from behind the half-line (59 meters) against NorthEast United FC, which proved crucial to a 2–1 victory. His side reached the season's final, losing to Hyderabad FC on penalties.

Vázquez left the Blasters in May 2022.

=== Goa ===
In April 2022, it was reportedly agreed that Vázquez would join FC Goa as a free agent; on 24 June, the player agreed to a two-year deal. He scored his only goal on 10 December, as the hosts defeated Odisha 3–0.

=== Later career ===
Vázquez resumed his career in the Spanish Primera Federación, where he represented SD Ponferradina and Linares Deportivo. On 25 July 2024, the 33-year-old moved down to Tercera Federación with CF Badalona.

== International career ==
Vázquez represented Spain at the 2011 FIFA U-20 World Cup in Colombia. He finished the competition with five goals (tied with Henrique of eventual champions Brazil), as the nation reached the quarter-finals.

Also in 2011, Vázquez made his debut for the under-21 team. He helped them win the 2013 UEFA European Championship by scoring in his only appearance, the 3–0 group stage win against the Netherlands.

== Career statistics ==
As of match played 10 April 2023

Appearances and goals by club, season and competition
Club	Season	League			Cup		Continental		Total	
Club	Season	Division	Apps	Goals	Apps	Goals	Apps	Goals	Apps	Goals
Espanyol	2010–11	La Liga	30	4	4	2	—		34	6
Espanyol	2011–12	La Liga	28	5	5	5	—		33	10
Espanyol	2012–13	La Liga	2	1	0	0	—		2	1
Espanyol	Total		60	10	9	7	—		69	17
Getafe	2012–13	La Liga	29	4	2	0	—		31	4
Getafe	2013–14	La Liga	1	0	0	0	—		1	0
Getafe	2014–15	La Liga	21	7	5	2	—		26	9
Getafe	2015–16	La Liga	34	5	1	1	—		35	6
Getafe	2016–17	Segunda División	1	0	0	0	—		1	0
Getafe	Total		86	16	8	3	—		94	19
Swansea City (loan)	2013–14	Premier League	12	0	4	0	4 (Note: Appearances in UEFA Europa League)	0	20	0
Espanyol	2016–17	La Liga	10	0	0	0	—		10	0
Espanyol	2017–18	La Liga	0	0	2	0	—		2	0
Espanyol	Total		10	0	2	0	—		12	0
Gimnàstic (loan)	2017–18	Segunda División	18	6	0	0	—		18	6
Zaragoza (loan)	2018–19	Segunda División	32	10	1	0	—		33	10
Sporting Gijón	2019–20	Segunda División	37	5	1	0	—		38	5
Sporting Gijón	2020–21	Segunda División	16	1	1	0	—		17	1
Sporting Gijón	Total		53	6	2	0	—		55	6
Sabadell (loan)	2020–21	Segunda División	9	0	0	0	—		9	0
Kerala Blasters	2021–22	Indian Super League	23	8	—		—		23	8
Goa	2022–23	Indian Super League	17	1	1 (Note: Appearance in Super Cup)	0	—		18	1
Career total			320	57	27	10	4	0	351	67

== Honours ==
Spain U21

- UEFA European Under-21 Championship: 2013

Individual

- FIFA U-20 World Cup Silver Shoe: 2011
