= Gerard Moreno =

Spanish footballer (born 1992)

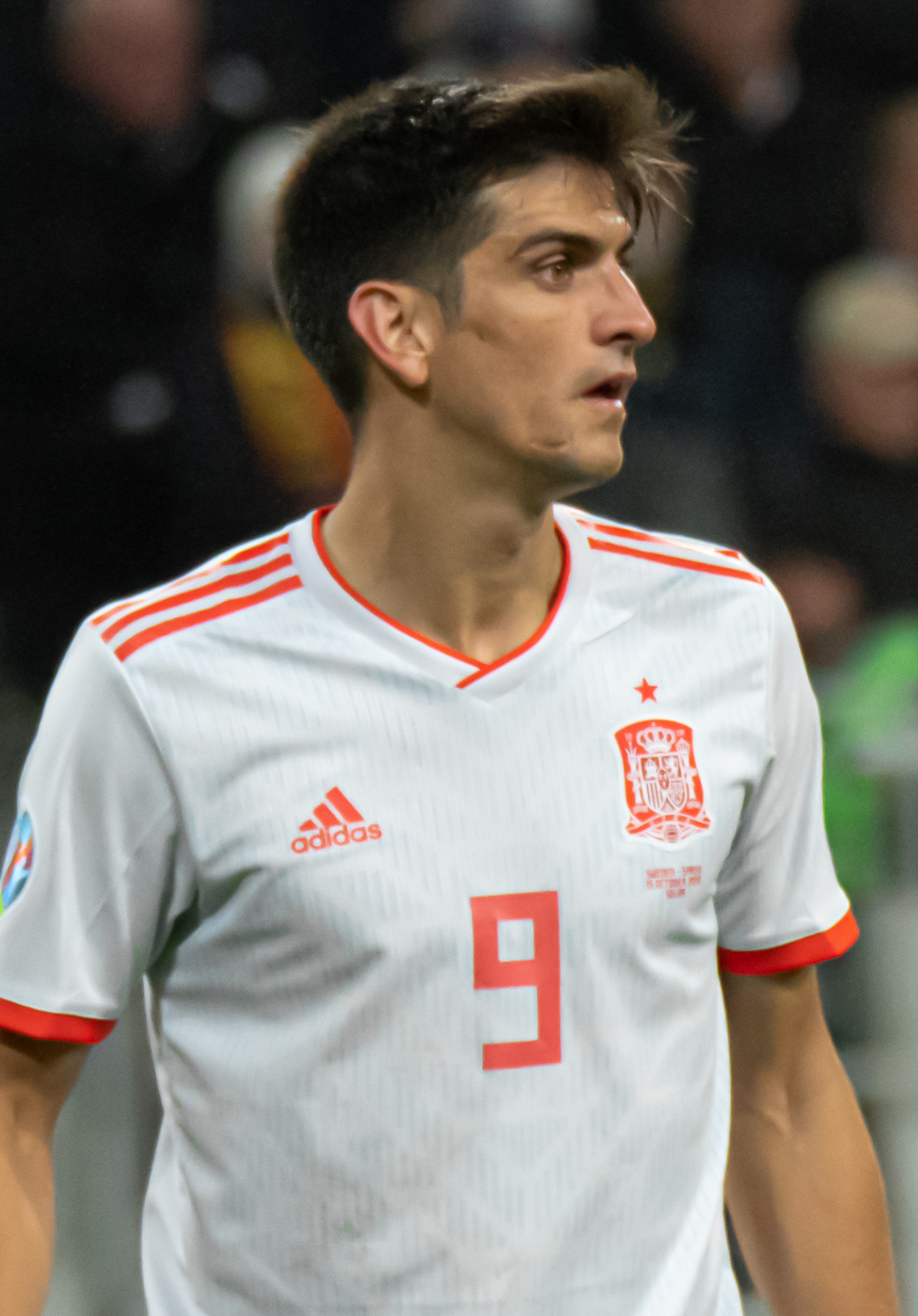
- Gerard with Spain in 2019

Personal information
- Full name: Gerard Moreno Balagueró
- Date of birth: 7 April 1992 (age 34)
- Place of birth: Santa Perpètua de Mogoda, Spain
- Height: 1.80 m (5 ft 11 in)
- Position: Striker

Team information
- Current team: Villarreal
- Number: 7

Youth career
- 2000–2001: Damm
- 2001–2007: Espanyol
- 2007–2010: Badalona

Senior career*
Years	Team	Apps	(Gls)
2010–2011	Villarreal C	38	(34)
2011–2013	Villarreal B	29	(13)
2012–2015	Villarreal	40	(10)
2013–2014	→ Mallorca (loan)	31	(11)
2015–2018	Espanyol	107	(36)
2018–	Villarreal	220	(90)

International career
2019–2024	Spain	18	(5)
2014–2016	Catalonia	3	(1)
Medal record
Men's football
Representing Spain
UEFA European Championship
Bronze medal – third place	2020 Europe
- * Club domestic league appearances and goals as of 22:33, 30 October 2026 (UTC)

Gerard Moreno Balagueró (born 7 April 1992) is a Spanish professional footballer who plays as a striker for and captains La Liga club Villarreal.

In his career, he played for Villarreal (two spells), Mallorca and Espanyol, winning the 2021 Europa League and two Zarra Trophies with the first club. In La Liga, he played more than 340 games and scored more than 130 goals.

Moreno made his full debut for Spain in 2019, being part of the squad at UEFA Euro 2020.

== Club career ==
=== Villarreal ===
Born in Santa Perpètua de Mogoda, Barcelona, Catalonia, Moreno joined Villarreal in 2010 from local club Badalona. On 5 March 2011, while still a junior, he made his debut with the reserves, appearing as a late substitute in a 1–2 home loss against Rayo Vallecano. During his early spell he also represented the third team, scoring at an astonishing rate in the Tercera División.

Moreno scored his first goal as a professional on 10 December 2011, contributing to a 3–1 Segunda División home victory over Xerez. He played his first official game with Villarreal's main squad roughly one year later, starting in a 1–0 loss at Elche. He scored his first goal for the Yellow Submarine on 25 January 2013, opening a 3–0 defeat of Sabadell.

On 8 July 2013, Moreno signed with Mallorca of the second tier in a season-long loan. He subsequently returned to Villarreal, being definitely promoted to the first team now in La Liga.

Moreno made his debut in the Spanish top flight on 14 September 2014, starting in a 0–0 away draw against Granada. He scored his first goal in the competition ten days later, in a 1–1 draw at Eibar.

=== Espanyol ===
On 13 August 2015, Moreno signed a five-year deal with fellow top-division side Espanyol, who bought 50% of his rights for a €1.5 million fee. The following 23 January, he scored in a 2–2 home draw against his former team before being sent off.

Moreno netted 16 times in the 2017–18 season, in an 11th-place finish.

=== Villarreal return ===
Moreno returned to Villarreal on 12 June 2018, agreeing to a five-year contract. Having retained 50% of the player's rights previously, his former club paid Espanyol €20 million in the transfer to buy back the remaining 50% and acquire the player outright.

Moreno finished 2019–20 with 18 league goals, thus winning the Zarra Trophy. He renewed the accolade the following season with 23 and a team-best seven assists, scoring a further seven times in their victorious run in the UEFA Europa League; he was later voted the Europa League's Player of the Season, beating Manchester United duo Bruno Fernandes and Edinson Cavani.

On 10 August 2021, Moreno signed a new six-year deal. The following day, he scored in the UEFA Super Cup against Chelsea, surpassing Giuseppe Rossi to become the club's second all-time top scorer at 83 goals; only Adriano García remained ahead of him with 109.

Moreno featured much less in the 2021–22 and 2022–23 campaigns, due to injury problems. He scored his 100th competitive goal for Villarreal on in his 222nd appearance on 12 November 2022, netting twice in a 9–0 away rout of amateurs Santa Amalia in the first round of the Copa del Rey.

== International career ==
Moreno was never capped for Spain at any youth level. He made his senior debut on 15 October 2019, playing the entire 1–1 draw in Sweden for the UEFA Euro 2020 qualifiers. One month later, for the same competition and also as a starter, he scored his first goal in a 7–0 rout of Malta in Cádiz for the already qualified hosts. On 18 November, he added a brace in the 5–0 victory over Romania, being included in Luis Enrique's 24-man squad for the finals on 24 May 2021.

== Career statistics ==
=== Club ===
As of match played 30 October 2026

Appearances and goals by club, season and competition
Club	Season	League			Copa del Rey		Europe		Other		Total	
Club	Season	Division	Apps	Goals	Apps	Goals	Apps	Goals	Apps	Goals	Apps	Goals
Villarreal C	2010–11	Tercera División	38	34	—		—		—		38	34
Villarreal B	2010–11	Segunda División	1	0	—		—		—		1	0
Villarreal B	2011–12	Segunda División	4	1	—		—		—		4	1
Villarreal B	2012–13	Segunda División B	24	12	—		—		—		24	12
Villarreal B	Total		29	13	—		—		—		29	13
Villarreal	2012–13	Segunda División	14	3	0	0	—		—		14	3
Villarreal	2014–15	La Liga	26	7	6	5	7 (Note: Appearances in UEFA Europa League)	4	—		39	16
Villarreal	Total		40	10	6	5	7	4	—		53	19
Mallorca (loan)	2013–14	Segunda División	31	11	1	1	—		—		32	12
Espanyol	2015–16	La Liga	32	7	4	0	—		—		36	7
Espanyol	2016–17	La Liga	37	13	1	0	—		—		38	13
Espanyol	2017–18	La Liga	38	16	6	3	—		—		44	19
Espanyol	Total		107	36	11	3	—		—		118	39
Villarreal	2018–19	La Liga	35	8	3	1	11	4	—		49	13
Villarreal	2019–20	La Liga	35	18	2	2	—		—		37	20
Villarreal	2020–21	La Liga	33	23	1	0	12	7	—		46	30
Villarreal	2021–22	La Liga	17	9	2	1	7 (Note: Appearances in UEFA Champions League)	2	1 (Note: Appearance in UEFA Super Cup)	1	27	13
Villarreal	2022–23	La Liga	21	7	3	3	5 (Note: Appearances in UEFA Europa Conference League)	1	—		29	11
Villarreal	2023–24	La Liga	30	10	2	0	6	1	—		38	11
Villarreal	2024–25	La Liga	17	3	1	0	—		—		18	3
Villarreal	2025–26	La Liga	22	10	0	0	2	0	—		24	10
Villarreal	2026–27	La Liga	10	2	0	0	3	0	—		13	2
Villarreal	Total		220	90	14	7	46	15	1	1	281	113
Career total			465	194	32	16	53	19	1	1	551	230

=== International ===
Appearances and goals by national team and year
National team	Year	Apps	Goals
Spain	2019	3	3
Spain	2020	6	1
Spain	2021	8	1
Spain	2024	1	0
Total		18	5

Spain score listed first, score column indicates score after each Gerard goal.

List of international goals by Gerard Moreno
No.	Date	Venue	Opponent	Score	Result	Competition
1	15 November 2019	Estadio Ramón de Carranza, Cádiz, Spain	Malta	6–0	7–0	UEFA Euro 2020 qualifying
2	18 November 2019	Metropolitano Stadium, Madrid, Spain	Romania	2–0	5–0	UEFA Euro 2020 qualifying
3	18 November 2019	Metropolitano Stadium, Madrid, Spain	Romania	3–0	5–0	UEFA Euro 2020 qualifying
4	14 November 2020	St. Jakob-Park, Basel, Switzerland	Switzerland	1–1	1–1	2020–21 UEFA Nations League A
5	31 March 2021	Estadio de La Cartuja, Seville, Spain	Kosovo	3–1	3–1	2022 FIFA World Cup qualification

== Honours ==
Espanyol

- Supercopa de Catalunya: 2016

Villarreal

- UEFA Europa League: 2020–21

Individual

- Zarra Trophy: 2019–20, 2020–21
- UEFA Europa League top scorer: 2020–21 (joint – 7 goals)
- UEFA Europa League Squad of the Season: 2020–21
- UEFA Europa League Player of the Season: 2020–21
- UEFA Europa League top assists provider: 2020–21 (joint – 5 assists)
- UEFA Super Cup Man of the Match: 2021
