= Papakouli Diop =

Senegalese footballer (born 1986)

Pape Diop
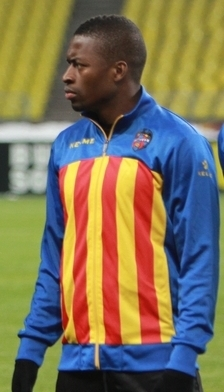
- Diop with Levante in 2013

Personal information
- Full name: Papakouli Diop
- Date of birth: 19 March 1986 (age 40)
- Place of birth: Kaolack, Senegal
- Height: 1.80 m (5 ft 11 in)
- Position: Defensive midfielder

Youth career
- 2004–2006: Rennes

Senior career*
Years	Team	Apps	(Gls)
2006	Rennes	1	(0)
2006–2008	Tours	36	(3)
2008–2009	Gimnàstic	43	(4)
2009–2012	Racing Santander	76	(2)
2012–2015	Levante	85	(4)
2015–2017	Espanyol	53	(3)
2018–2021	Eibar	106	(3)
2021–2023	Ibiza	51	(2)
Total		451	(21)

International career
2010–2017	Senegal	20	(2)
- * Club domestic league appearances and goals

Papakouli "Pape" Diop (born 19 March 1986) is a Senegalese former professional footballer who played as a defensive midfielder.

After starting out at Rennes in France, he went on to spend most of his career in Spain. Over 12 seasons, he amassed La Liga totals of 320 matches and 12 goals, with Racing de Santander, Levante, Espanyol and Eibar.

Diop represented Senegal in two Africa Cup of Nations tournaments, 2015 and 2017.

== Club career ==
=== France ===
Born in Kaolack, Diop moved to France at early age and played youth football for Stade Rennais FC, making his first-team – and Ligue 1 – debut on 5 August 2006, as an injury-time substitute in a 1–2 home loss against Lille OSC. In the summer of 2006 he joined Tours FC, being relegated from Ligue 2 in his first season; in his beginnings, he was often deployed as an attacking midfielder and a second striker.

=== Spain ===
On 31 January 2008, Diop signed with Gimnàstic de Tarragona of the Spanish Segunda División. After one and a half seasons with the Catalans, he moved to La Liga with Racing de Santander for €1.5 million.

Diop played his first game in the Spanish top division on 12 September 2009, starting in a 1–1 away draw with Atlético Madrid. His first league goal came on 21 March of the following year, when he closed the 3–1 win at CA Osasuna.

In the 2011–12 campaign, Diop appeared in all but four matches for the Cantabrians while totalling 2,864 minutes, but his team was relegated after finishing 20th. Shortly after, he joined Levante UD of the same league for a €100,000 fee.

Diop contributed nine appearances in the 2012–13 edition of the UEFA Europa League, in a round-of-16 exit. On 22 November 2012, he scored in the 3–1 away victory over Helsingborgs IF in the group phase.

On 4 May 2014, Diop was allegedly subjected to monkey chants from a section of Atlético Madrid fans, and provided a unique response by dancing in front of his abusers. On 5 June of the following year, he left after his contract expired.

On 31 August 2015, Diop signed a three-year deal with RCD Espanyol also in the top tier. On 22 December 2017, after cutting ties with the club, he agreed to an 18-month contract at fellow top-flight side SD Eibar.

On 20 August 2021, free agent Diop joined second division newcomers UD Ibiza on a one-year contract.

== International career ==
Diop won his first cap for Senegal on 17 November 2010, in a 2–1 friendly win over Gabon. He was part of the squads at the 2015 and 2017 Africa Cup of Nations, helping the nation reach the quarter-finals in the latter edition where he scored in the 2–2 group-stage draw with Algeria.

== Career statistics ==
=== Club ===
As of match played 31 July 2020

Appearances and goals by club, season and competition
Club	Season	League			National cup		Other		Total	
Club	Season	Division	Apps	Goals	Apps	Goals	Apps	Goals	Apps	Goals
Rennes	2006–07	Ligue 1	1	0	0	0	0	0	1	0
Tours	2006–07	Ligue 2	18	3	0	0	0	0	18	3
Tours	2007–08	Championnat National	18	0	0	0	0	0	18	0
Tours	Total		36	3	0	0	0	0	36	3
Gimnàstic	2008–09	Segunda División	30	4	0	0	—		30	4
Racing Santander	2009–10	La Liga	23	1	6	1	—		29	2
Racing Santander	2010–11	La Liga	19	0	1	0	—		20	0
Racing Santander	2011–12	La Liga	34	1	2	0	—		36	1
Racing Santander	Total		76	2	9	1	0	0	85	3
Levante	2012–13	La Liga	32	0	0	0	9 (Note: Appearances in UEFA Europa League)	1	41	1
Levante	2013–14	La Liga	34	4	2	0	—		36	4
Levante	2014–15	La Liga	19	0	0	0	—		19	0
Levante	Total		85	4	2	0	9	1	96	5
Espanyol	2015–16	La Liga	30	3	2	0	—		32	3
Espanyol	2016–17	La Liga	18	0	1	0	—		19	0
Espanyol	2017–18	La Liga	5	0	2	0	—		7	0
Espanyol	Total		53	3	5	0	0	0	58	3
Eibar	2017–18	La Liga	15	0	0	0	—		15	0
Eibar	2018–19	La Liga	28	1	1	0	—		29	1
Eibar	2019–20	La Liga	30	1	0	0	–		30	1
Eibar	Total		73	2	1	0	0	0	74	1
Career total			323	18	17	1	9	1	349	19

=== International ===
Scores and results list Senegal's goal tally first, score column indicates score after each Diop goal.

Goal	Date	Venue	Opponent	Score	Result	Competition
1.	21 May 2014	Stade du 4-Août, Ouagadougou, Burkina Faso	Burkina Faso	1–0	1–1	Friendly
2.	23 January 2017	Stade de Franceville, Franceville, Gabon	Algeria	1–1	2–2	2017 Africa Cup of Nations
