= Léo Baptistão =

Brazilian footballer

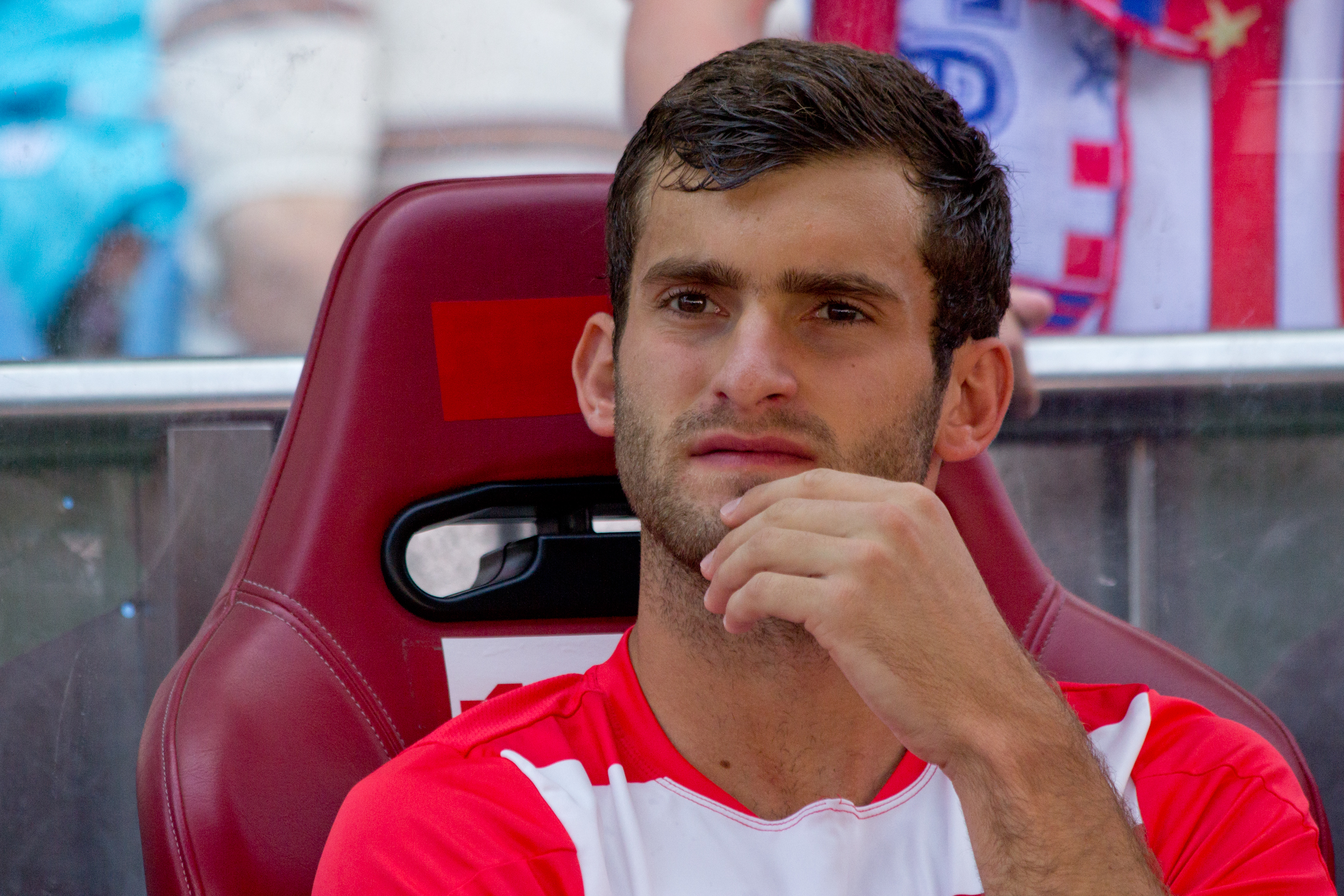
- Baptistão with Atlético Madrid in 2013

Personal information
- Full name: Leonardo Micali Carrilho Baptistão
- Date of birth: 26 August 1992 (age 34)
- Place of birth: Santos, Brazil
- Height: 1.85 m (6 ft 1 in)
- Positions: Forward; winger

Team information
- Current team: Almería
- Number: 12

Youth career
- Portuguesa Santista
- 2008–2011: Rayo Vallecano
- 2009–2010: → San Fernando (loan)

Senior career*
Years	Team	Apps	(Gls)
2011–2012	Rayo Vallecano B	17	(4)
2012–2013	Rayo Vallecano	28	(7)
2013–2016	Atlético Madrid	5	(0)
2014	→ Betis (loan)	17	(1)
2014–2015	→ Rayo Vallecano (loan)	25	(7)
2015–2016	→ Villarreal (loan)	26	(3)
2016–2019	Espanyol	77	(16)
2019–2021	Wuhan Zall	44	(9)
2021–2022	Santos	31	(6)
2022–	Almería	145	(30)
- * Club domestic league appearances and goals as of 21:55, 15 November 2026 (UTC)

Leonardo "Léo" Micali Carrilho Baptistão (born 26 August 1992) is a Brazilian professional footballer who plays for Segunda División club Almería. Mainly a forward, he can also play as a winger.

He spent most of his career in Spain, making 238 appearances and scoring 43 goals in La Liga. He represented Rayo Vallecano, Atlético Madrid, Betis, Villarreal, Espanyol and Almería in the competition, and played a part in Atlético's league win in 2013–14. He also featured briefly for Santos in the Campeonato Brasileiro Série A.

== Career ==
=== Early career ===
Born in Santos, São Paulo, Baptistão began playing football for Associação Atlética Portuguesa (Santos), alongside Neymar. Aged only 16, he moved to Spain and joined Rayo Vallecano's youth system. However, he soon contracted hepatitis and had to return home to be treated by his father, a doctor; subsequently, he was loaned to CD San Fernando de Henares after the Royal Spanish Football Federation prevented him from joining his previous club.

=== Rayo Vallecano ===
In July 2011, after playing his last year as a junior again with Rayo, Baptistão joined the first team for the preseason. However, in his debut, a Trophy of Vallecas match against Sporting de Gijón, he suffered a collarbone injury; his first appearances as a senior were made with the reserves in the Segunda División B.

In the summer of 2012, Baptistão was recalled for Rayo's main squad for the preseason. He made his first-team debut on 25 August, starting a 2–1 La Liga away win against Real Betis, assisting Piti on one goal and scoring the decider. On 16 September, he netted against Atlético Madrid but in a 4–3 away loss, adding a brace the following month at RCD Espanyol but again not being able to earn a single point.

Baptistão quickly became first-choice in his first year with the Paco Jémez-led side. On 3 November 2012, he provided a further two assists for Piti in the 2–1 away victory over Málaga CF, scoring his fifth goal of the season the next game, a 3–2 home defeat of RC Celta de Vigo.

In January 2013, with the winter transfer window opened, Baptistão was linked with moves to the likes of Liverpool, Manchester United, Queens Park Rangers, Leeds United and Brighton, but nothing came of it. On 14 February, in his second appearance after being sidelined several weeks with a muscle injury, he closed the 2–1 home win over Atlético Madrid, only to be downed with another collarbone ailment in April, which sidelined him for the rest of the season.

=== Atlético Madrid ===
On 3 June 2013, Baptistão signed a five-year contract with Atlético Madrid for an undisclosed fee. He made his debut for his new team on 21 August, replacing Arda Turan in a 1–1 home draw with FC Barcelona in the first leg of the Supercopa de España, which was eventually lost on the away goals rule.

Baptistão scored his first goal for the Colchoneros on 18 September 2013, in a 3–1 home win over FC Zenit Saint Petersburg in that season's UEFA Champions League. It was also his maiden appearance in the competition.

On 11 January 2014, Baptistão joined Betis on loan until June. He scored in the 2–0 away victory against city rivals Sevilla FC in the last 16 of the UEFA Europa League, but the tie ended in penalty shootout elimination.

On 19 August 2014, Baptistão joined former side Rayo in a season-long loan. In late September, in two matches separated by only three days, he earned his team six points by scoring braces at home against Athletic Bilbao (2–1) and at Levante UD (2–0).

Baptistão was loaned to Villarreal CF in July 2015, with the club having an option to buy him at the end of the campaign. On 27 September, he helped defeat Atlético Madrid by scoring the game's only goal at the Estadio El Madrigal, and four days later, against FC Viktoria Plzeň in the Europa League group stage, repeated the feat.

=== Espanyol ===
On 9 July 2016, Baptistão signed a five-year deal with Espanyol. In his second season, he scored a career-best eight goals.

=== Wuhan Zall ===
On 31 January 2019, Baptistão transferred to Chinese Super League newcomers Wuhan Zall FC. He made his debut on 1 March in a 0–1 home loss to Beijing Sinobo Guoan FC, scoring his first goal on 11 May in the 2–1 win at Dalian Professional FC.

=== Santos ===
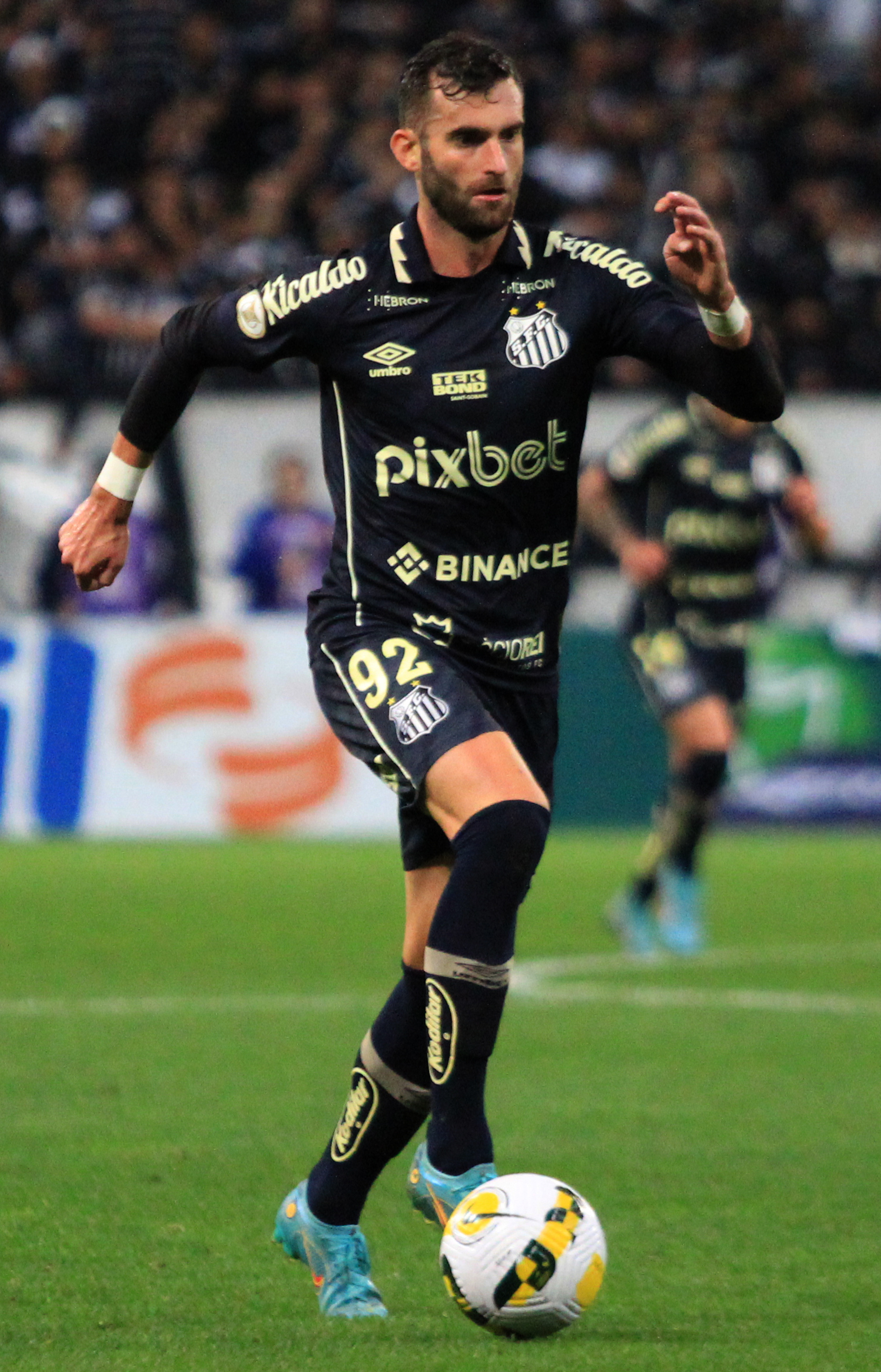
Baptistão with Santos in 2022

On 21 August 2021, Baptistão joined his hometown club Santos FC until May 2023, returning to Brazil after 13 years. He made his debut on 4 September, starting in a 2–1 defeat away to Cuiabá Esporte Clube, and finished the season with just eight appearances due to injury.

Baptistão scored his first goal for Peixe on 16 March 2022, a last-minute equaliser in the 3–3 Campeonato Paulista away draw against Associação Ferroviária de Esportes.

=== Almería ===
On 10 August 2022, Santos announced the transfer of Baptistão to UD Almería. He signed a four-year deal for a fee of R$7.8 million (€1.5 million).

== Career statistics ==
As of match played 1 June 2025

Appearances and goals by club, season and competition
Club	Season	League			State league		National cup (Note: Includes Copa del Rey, Chinese FA Cup, Copa do Brasil)		Continental		Other		Total	
Club	Season	Division	Apps	Goals	Apps	Goals	Apps	Goals	Apps	Goals	Apps	Goals	Apps	Goals
Rayo Vallecano B	2011–12	Segunda División B	17	4	—		—		—		—		17	4
Rayo Vallecano	2012–13	La Liga	28	7	—		1	0	—		—		29	7
Atlético Madrid	2013–14	La Liga	5	0	—		1	0	3 (Note: Appearances in UEFA Champions League)	1	2 (Note: Appearances in Supercopa de España)	0	11	1
Betis (loan)	2013–14	La Liga	17	1	—		1	0	4 (Note: Appearances in UEFA Europa League)	1	—		22	2
Rayo Vallecano (loan)	2014–15	La Liga	25	7	—		1	0	—		—		26	7
Villarreal (loan)	2015–16	La Liga	26	3	—		2	1	6	2	—		34	6
Espanyol	2016–17	La Liga	21	6	—		1	0	—		—		22	6
Espanyol	2017–18	La Liga	36	8	—		4	1	—		—		40	9
Espanyol	2018–19	La Liga	20	2	—		4	1	—		—		24	3
Espanyol	Total		77	16	—		9	2	—		—		86	18
Wuhan Zall	2019	Chinese Super League	27	7	—		0	0	—		—		27	7
Wuhan Zall	2020	Chinese Super League	15	2	—		0	0	—		2 (Note: Appearances in Chinese Super League relegation play-offs)	0	17	2
Wuhan Zall	2021	Chinese Super League	2	0	—		0	0	—		—		2	0
Wuhan Zall	Total		44	9	—		0	0	—		2	0	46	9
Santos	2021	Série A	8	0	—		0	0	—		—		8	0
Santos	2022	Série A	17	5	6	1	4	0	3 (Note: Appearances in Copa Sudamericana)	1	—		30	7
Santos	Total		25	5	6	1	4	0	3	1	—		38	7
Almería	2022–23	La Liga	28	5	—		0	0	—		—		28	5
Almería	2023–24	La Liga	32	6	—		2	0	—		—		34	6
Almería	2024–25	Segunda División	37	10	—		2	1	—		2 (Note: Appearances in La Liga play-offs)	0	41	11
Almería	Total		97	21	—		—		3	1	2	0	103	22
Career total			361	73	6	1	23	4	16	5	6	0	412	83

== Honours ==
Atlético Madrid

- La Liga: 2013–14
- Supercopa de España runner-up: 2013
- UEFA Champions League runner-up: 2013–14
