= Aarón Martín (footballer, born 1997) =

Spanish footballer (born 1997)

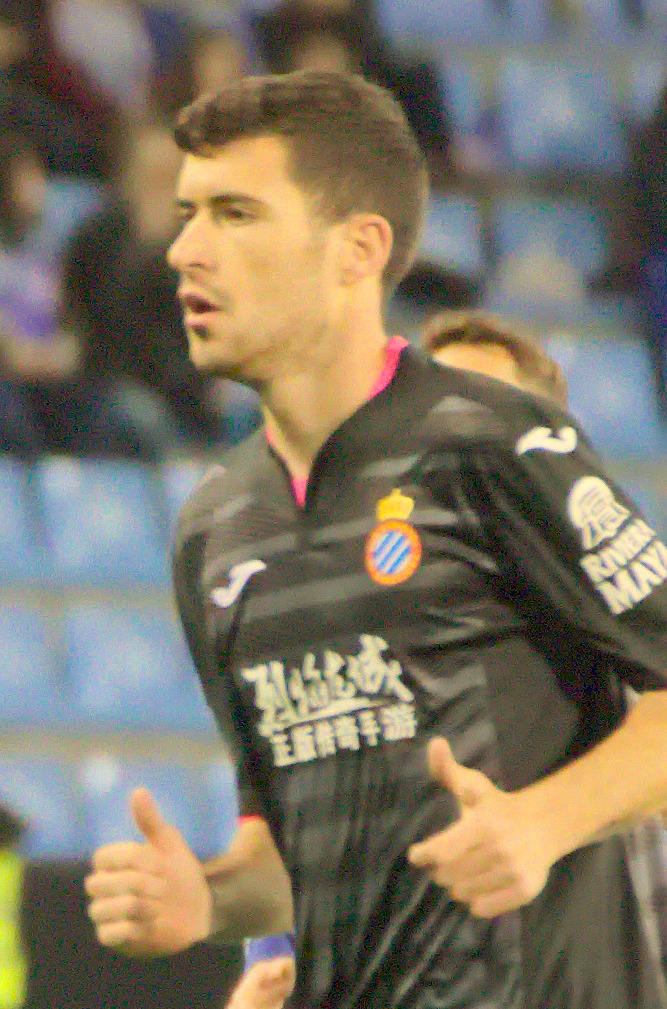
- Aarón playing for Espanyol in 2017

Personal information
- Full name: Aarón Martín Caricol
- Date of birth: 22 April 1997 (age 29)
- Place of birth: Montmeló, Spain
- Height: 1.80 m (5 ft 11 in)
- Position: Left-back

Team information
- Current team: Racing Santander
- Number: 3

Youth career
- 2003–2005: Montmeló
- 2005–2015: Espanyol

Senior career*
Years	Team	Apps	(Gls)
2015–2016	Espanyol B	36	(1)
2016–2019	Espanyol	62	(0)
2018–2019	→ Mainz 05 (loan)	33	(0)
2019–2023	Mainz 05	83	(6)
2021	→ Celta (loan)	19	(0)
2023–2026	Genoa	91	(1)
2026–	Racing Santander	1	(0)

International career
2013	Spain U16	1	(0)
2013	Spain U17	6	(0)
2014–2016	Spain U19	18	(2)
2017–2019	Spain U21	12	(0)
2016	Catalonia	1	(0)
- * Club domestic league appearances and goals as of 07:50, 15 September 2026 (UTC)

Aarón Martín Caricol (born 22 April 1997) is a Spanish professional footballer who plays as a left-back for La Liga club Racing de Santander.

== Club career ==
=== Espanyol ===
Born in Montmeló, Barcelona, Catalonia, Martín joined RCD Espanyol's youth setup in 2005. On 29 March 2015, while still a junior, he made his senior debut with the reserves by starting in a 1–0 Segunda División B away loss against Gimnàstic de Tarragona.

Martín scored his first senior goal on 16 January 2016, the first in a 2–0 home win over CF Reus Deportiu. On 13 June, already being a starter, he renewed his contract until 2020.

On 2 October 2016, Martín made his first-team – and La Liga – debut, coming on as a second half substitute for Diego Reyes in a 0–0 home draw against Villarreal CF. The following 28 January, he agreed to an extension until 2022, being definitely promoted to the first team three days later.

=== Mainz 05 ===
On 6 August 2018, Martín joined German club 1. FSV Mainz 05 on a season-long loan. His first appearance in the Bundesliga took place on 26 August, in a 1–0 home defeat of VfB Stuttgart where he featured the full 90 minutes.

Martín signed a permanent contract on 5 November 2018, effective as of the following 1 July. On 31 December 2020, he was loaned to RC Celta de Vigo for the remainder of the campaign with an option to buy.

Martín scored his first goal as a professional on 18 February 2022, helping the hosts to beat Bayer 04 Leverkusen 32. He netted a career-best five in 2022–23, also providing three assists.

=== Genoa ===
On 3 July 2023, Martín signed with Genoa CFC in the Serie A. He scored his first goal for them on 22 November 2025, closing the 3–3 draw at Cagliari Calcio.

=== Racing Santander ===
Martín returned to Spain in September 2026, agreeing to a one-year deal at Racing de Santander.

== International career ==
On 28 December 2016, Martín made his debut for the Catalonia national team, starting in a 3–3 draw against Tunisia (4–2 loss on penalties).

== Career statistics ==
As of match played 24 May 2026

Appearances and goals by club, season and competition
Club	Season	League			National Cup		Total	
Club	Season	Division	Apps	Goals	Apps	Goals	Apps	Goals
Espanyol B	2014–15	Segunda División B	3	0	—		3	0
Espanyol B	2015–16	Segunda División B	28	1	—		28	1
Espanyol B	2016–17	Segunda División B	5	0	—		5	0
Espanyol B	Total		36	1	0	0	36	1
Espanyol	2016–17	La Liga	30	0	1	0	31	0
Espanyol	2017–18	La Liga	32	0	3	0	35	0
Espanyol	Total		62	0	4	0	66	0
Mainz 05 (loan)	2018–19	Bundesliga	33	0	1	0	34	0
Mainz 05	2019–20	Bundesliga	22	0	1	0	23	0
Mainz 05	2020–21	Bundesliga	5	0	0	0	5	0
Mainz 05	2021–22	Bundesliga	28	1	3	0	31	1
Mainz 05	2022–23	Bundesliga	28	5	3	0	31	5
Mainz 05	Total		116	6	8	0	124	6
Celta (loan)	2020–21	La Liga	19	0	1	0	20	0
Genoa	2023–24	Serie A	22	0	2	0	24	0
Genoa	2024–25	Serie A	36	0	2	0	38	0
Genoa	2025–26	Serie A	33	1	2	0	35	1
Genoa	Total		91	1	6	0	97	1
Career total			324	8	19	0	343	8

== Honours ==
Spain U21

- UEFA European Under-21 Championship: 2019
