= David López (footballer, born 1989) =

Spanish footballer

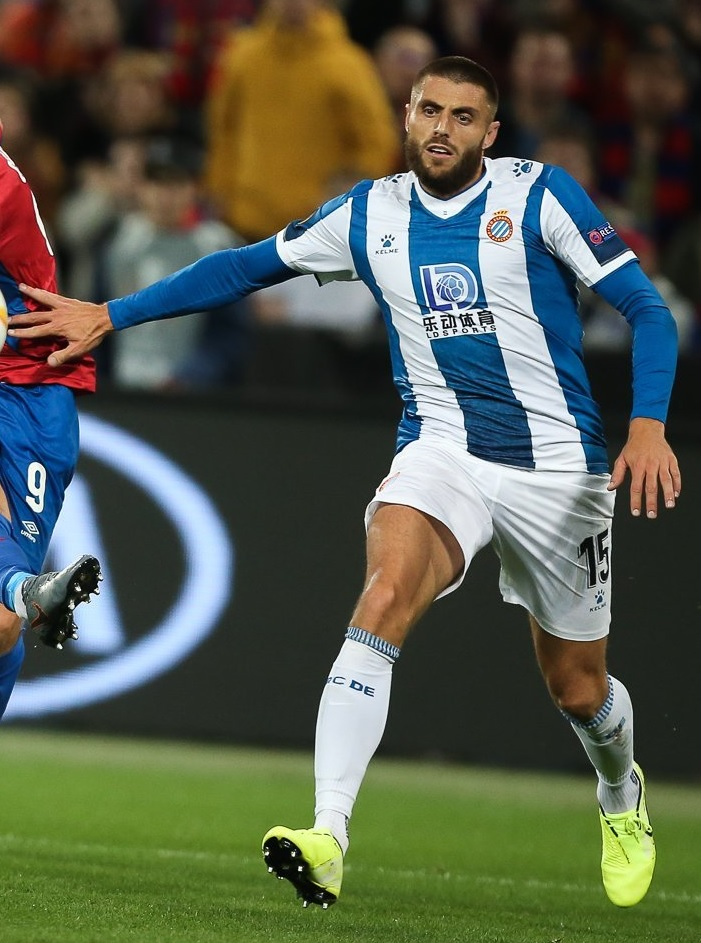
- López with Espanyol in 2019

Personal information
- Full name: David López Silva
- Date of birth: 9 October 1989 (age 37)
- Place of birth: Barcelona, Spain
- Height: 1.83 m (6 ft 0 in)
- Positions: Defensive midfielder; centre-back

Team information
- Current team: Girona
- Number: 5

Youth career
- 1997–1999: Penya Blaugrana Sant Cugat
- 1999–2005: Mercantil
- 2005–2007: Damm
- 2007–2008: Espanyol

Senior career*
Years	Team	Apps	(Gls)
2008–2011	Espanyol B	54	(0)
2009–2010	→ Terrassa (loan)	31	(2)
2010–2014	Espanyol	37	(2)
2011–2012	→ Leganés (loan)	30	(4)
2012–2013	→ Huesca (loan)	38	(3)
2014–2016	Napoli	57	(2)
2016–2022	Espanyol	181	(9)
2022–	Girona	88	(7)

International career^{‡}
2013–	Catalonia	2	(0)
- * Club domestic league appearances and goals as of 20:23, 24 October 2026 (UTC) ‡ National team caps and goals as of 18:40, 23 June 2025 (UTC)

David López Silva (Spanish pronunciation: [daˈβið ˈlopeθ]; born 9 October 1989) is a Spanish professional footballer who plays as a defensive midfielder or centre-back for Segunda División club Girona.

He spent most of his career in two spells at Espanyol, making 237 appearances. He also played for two years with Napoli in Italy's Serie A.

== Club career ==
=== Espanyol ===
Born in Barcelona, Catalonia, López finished his youth career with local RCD Espanyol, and made his senior debut with the reserves in the 2008–09 season, in Tercera División. In August 2009 he was loaned to Terrassa FC of the Segunda División B, being a regular starter but suffering relegation.

López returned to Espanyol in June 2010, and made his main squad – and La Liga – debut on 26 September, coming on as a late substitute in a 1–0 home win against CA Osasuna. He continued to appear more regularly with the B side, however.

On 11 August 2011, López was loaned to CD Leganés in the third tier. A year later, he joined Segunda División club SD Huesca on the same basis.

López returned to Espanyol on 16 June 2013 after the Pericos recalled him. He scored his first goal in the top flight on 24 August, his team's first in a 3–1 home victory over Valencia CF.

=== Napoli ===
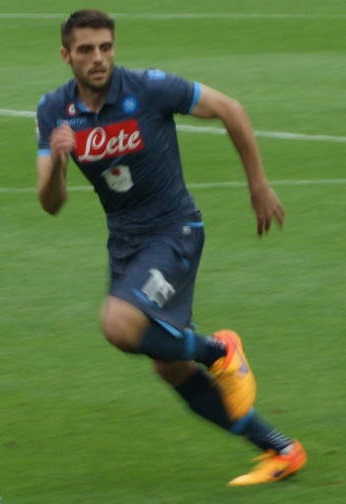
López with Napoli in 2015

On 31 August 2014, SSC Napoli confirmed López' signing on a five-year contract. He made his Serie A debut on 21 September, playing the full 90 minutes and being booked in a 1–0 defeat at Udinese Calcio. He won the Supercoppa Italiana on 22 December in Qatar; he made a mistake for Carlos Tevez of Juventus FC to open the scoring, though his side won on a penalty shootout after a 2–2 draw.

López scored his first competitive goal for the Italians (from 39 appearances) on 7 May 2015, putting his team ahead in an eventual 1–1 home draw against FC Dnipro Dnipropetrovsk in the semi-finals of the UEFA Europa League.

=== Espanyol return ===
On 26 August 2016, López returned to Espanyol on a four-year deal. During most of his second spell he was utilised by manager Quique Sánchez Flores as a central defender and, from that position, he scored in a 4–1 away loss to FC Barcelona in the Derbi barceloní on 18 December.

In August 2018, López agreed to an extension until 2023. He scored a top-flight best of four goals in the 2019–20 campaign, but his team were relegated; this started with the opener on 4 January in a 2–2 draw with Barcelona at the RCDE Stadium. On 23 February, he was sent off for the first time for the club, for two yellow cards in the opening 25 minutes of the 2–1 defeat at Real Valladolid.

López remained a regular as Espanyol won promotion as champions in May 2021. He scored once that season, equalising in a 3–1 win at CD Castellón on 26 March.

On 10 June 2022, López left as his contract was expiring. He featured in 237 official matches, scoring 12 times.

=== Girona ===
López remained in the top flight and his native region on 25 July 2022, on a two-year contract at Girona FC. In December 2023, aged 34, he extended his link to the club until June 2026.

On 2 October 2024, López scored Girona's first-ever goal in European competitions when he opened an eventual 2–3 home loss to Feyenoord in the league phase of the UEFA Champions League.

== International career ==
López was never capped by Spain at any level. He played one game for the unofficial Catalonia team on 30 December 2013, as a substitute in a 4–1 win over Cape Verde.

== Career statistics ==
As of match played 24 October 2026

Appearances and goals by club, season and competition
Club	Season	League			National cup (Note: Includes Copa del Rey, Coppa Italia)		Europe		Other		Total	
Club	Season	Division	Apps	Goals	Apps	Goals	Apps	Goals	Apps	Goals	Apps	Goals
Espanyol B	2008–09	Tercera División	29	0	—		—		—		29	0
Espanyol B	2010–11	Tercera División	25	0	—		—		—		25	0
Espanyol B	Total		54	0	—		—		—		54	0
Terrassa (loan)	2009–10	Segunda División B	31	2	—		—		—		31	2
Espanyol	2010–11	La Liga	3	0	0	0	—		—		3	0
Espanyol	2013–14	La Liga	33	2	4	1	—		—		37	3
Espanyol	2014–15	La Liga	1	0	—		—		—		1	0
Espanyol	Total		37	2	4	1	—		—		41	3
Leganés (loan)	2011–12	Segunda División B	30	4	2	0	—		—		32	4
Huesca (loan)	2012–13	Segunda División	38	3	2	0	—		—		40	3
Napoli	2014–15	Serie A	32	1	2	0	9 (Note: Appearances in UEFA Europa League)	1	1 (Note: Appearance in Supercoppa Italiana)	0	44	2
Napoli	2015–16	Serie A	25	1	2	0	8	0	—		35	1
Napoli	Total		57	2	4	0	17	1	1	0	79	3
Espanyol	2016–17	La Liga	36	3	1	0	—		—		37	3
Espanyol	2017–18	La Liga	37	1	6	0	—		—		43	1
Espanyol	2018–19	La Liga	21	0	3	0	—		—		24	0
Espanyol	2019–20	La Liga	32	4	1	0	3	0	—		36	4
Espanyol	2020–21	Segunda División	37	1	1	0	—		—		38	1
Espanyol	2021–22	La Liga	18	0	0	0	—		—		18	0
Espanyol	Total		181	9	8	0	3	0	—		196	9
Girona	2022–23	La Liga	20	3	0	0	—		—		20	3
Girona	2023–24	La Liga	25	3	0	0	—		—		25	3
Girona	2024–25	La Liga	29	1	1	0	5 (Note: Appearances in UEFA Champions League)	1	0	0	35	2
Girona	2025–26	La Liga	6	0	0	0	—		—		6	0
Girona	2026–27	Segunda División	8	0	0	0	—		—		8	0
Girona	Total		88	7	1	0	5	1	0	0	94	8
Career total			516	29	25	1	25	2	1	0	567	32

== Honours ==
Napoli

- Supercoppa Italiana: 2014

Espanyol

- Segunda División: 2020–21
