= Hernán Pérez (footballer, born 1989) =

Paraguayan footballer (born 1989)

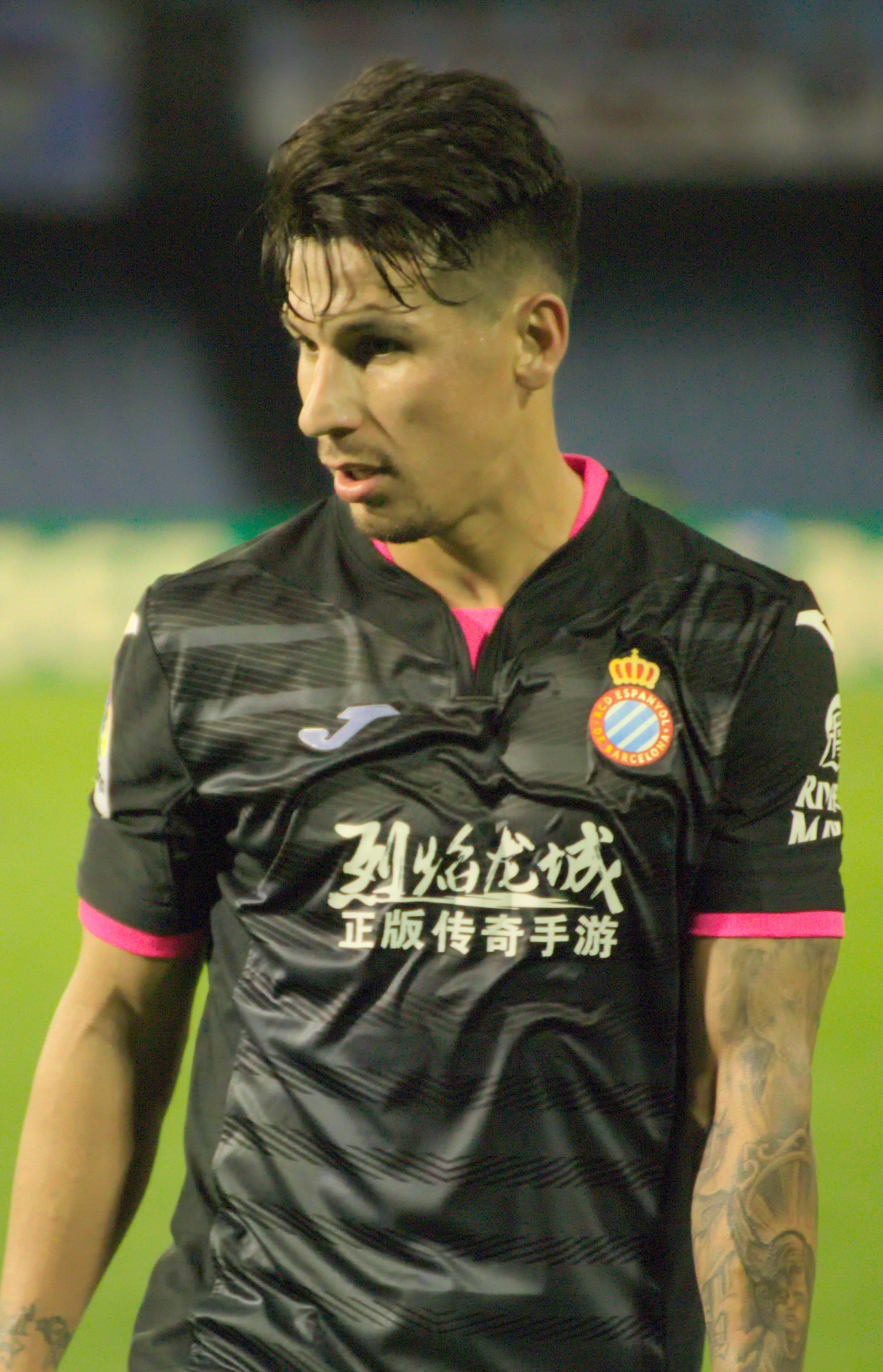
- Pérez with Espanyol in 2017

Personal information
- Full name: Hernán Arsenio Pérez González
- Date of birth: 25 February 1989 (age 37)
- Place of birth: Fernando de la Mora, Paraguay
- Height: 1.77 m (5 ft 10 in)
- Position: Winger

Team information
- Current team: 12 de Junio

Youth career
- Ytororó
- Cristóbal Colón
- 2005–2007: Tacuary

Senior career*
Years	Team	Apps	(Gls)
2007–2008	Tacuary	24	(5)
2008–2009	Libertad	1	(0)
2009–2011	Villarreal B	68	(5)
2011–2015	Villarreal	50	(7)
2014	→ Olympiacos (loan)	9	(2)
2015	→ Valladolid (loan)	16	(4)
2015–2019	Espanyol	87	(11)
2018	→ Alavés (loan)	10	(0)
2019–2022	Al Ahli	45	(9)
2022	Al-Markhiya	9	(0)
2022	Coritiba	2	(0)
2023	General Caballero	39	(2)
2024	Unión Comercio	28	(4)
2025	Recoleta	22	(3)
2026–	12 de Junio	1	(1)

International career
2009	Paraguay U20	15	(9)
2010–2021	Paraguay	41	(2)
Medal record
Representing Paraguay
Copa América
Runner-up	2011 Argentina	Team
- * Club domestic league appearances and goals as of 18:13, 29 September 2026 (UTC)

Hernán Arsenio Pérez González (born 25 February 1989) is a Paraguayan professional footballer who plays as a right winger for APF División Intermedia club 12 de Junio.

== Club career ==
=== Early years ===
Pérez was born in Fernando de la Mora, Asunción. After playing for two other youth clubs he finished his development with Tacuary, where he made his Paraguayan Primera División debut in 2007.

Subsequently, Pérez was signed by Libertad in the same league, appearing rarely for them due to a serious right-knee injury.

=== Villarreal ===
On 30 July 2009, Villarreal from Spain bought Pérez, who signed a five-year contract. He spent two full seasons with the reserves in the Segunda División, starting in several of the matches he featured in.

Pérez was definitely promoted to the Valencians' first team for the 2011–12 campaign. He made his competitive debut on 27 September in the UEFA Champions League game against Napoli, coming on as a substitute for Jonathan de Guzmán in the dying minutes of a 2–0 group-stage away loss. Again from the bench, on 1 October, he made his first La Liga appearance: from a corner kick, in the 84th minute, he equalised it 2–2 for the hosts against Real Zaragoza.

Pérez contributed 16 appearances and two goals in 2012–13, as the Yellow Submarine finished second and returned to the top flight one year after relegating. He joined Olympiacos on 31 January 2014, making his Super League Greece debut five days later in the 2–0 home victory over Panionios and scoring his first goal on 8 February in a 5–0 away rout of Veria.

On 30 January 2015, Pérez returned to Spain's second tier after being loaned to Real Valladolid until the end of the season.

=== Espanyol ===
On 3 July 2015, Pérez signed a four-year deal with top-division club Espanyol after his link with Villarreal expired. He quickly became a starter for the Sergio-led side and, on 21 November, took his season tally to four after scoring a brace to help down Málaga 2–0 at the Estadi Cornellà-El Prat.

On 12 January 2018, Pérez was loaned to Alavés of the same tier for six months.

=== Qatar ===
On 23 July 2019, Pérez cut ties with Espanyol and agreed to a three-year contract at Al Ahli of the Qatar Stars League. He stayed in the country in March 2022, moving to its Second Division with Al-Markhiya.

=== Later career ===
Pérez returned to Paraguay in January 2023 after 13 years away, joining General Caballero following a brief spell in the Campeonato Brasileiro Série A with Coritiba. On 20 May, he equalised an eventual 2–1 away win over Cerro Porteño.

Subsequently, Pérez represented in quick succession Unión Comercio (Peruvian Liga 1), Recoleta and 12 de Junio.

== International career ==
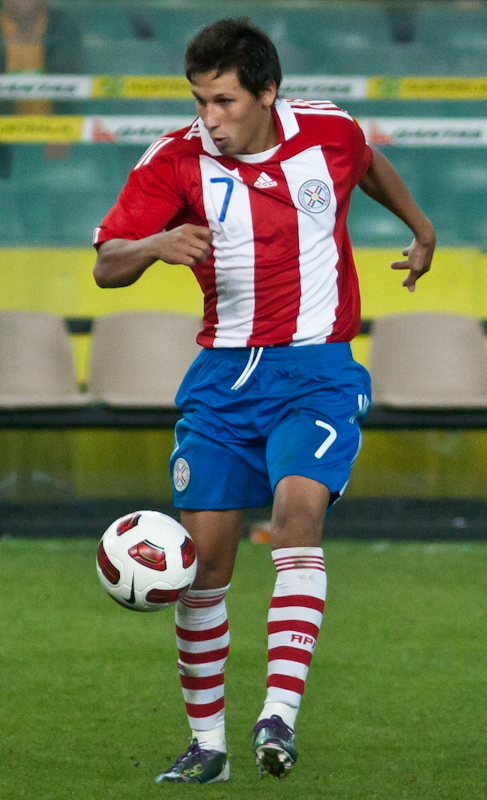
Pérez in action for Paraguay in 2010

Pérez was one of the best players for the Paraguayan under-20 team at the 2009 South American Championship, helping the nation finish in second place by scoring five goals in seven matches and ultimately being considered one of the best players in the tournament held in Venezuela.

He made his debut for the full side the following year at the age of 21, playing the last 20 minutes of a 1–1 friendly draw against South Africa, and was selected to the 2011 Copa América in Argentina, where he came on as a second-half replacement in the 3–0 loss to Uruguay in the final.

== Honours ==
Olympiacos

- Super League Greece: 2013–14
