= 2006–07 in Swiss football =

Football in Switzerland
- Season: 2006–07

Men's football
- Super League: Zürich
- Challenge League: Neuchâtel Xamax
- 1. Liga: Group 1: Étoile Carouge; Group 2: Basel U-21; Group 3: Red Star
- Swiss Cup: Basel

Women's football
- Swiss Women's Super League: FFC Zuchwil 05
- Swiss Cup: FFC Zürich Seebach

The following is a summary of the 2006–07 season of competitive football in Switzerland.

== Super League ==
=== Final league table ===
Pos	Team	Pld	W	D	L	GF	GA	GD	Pts	Qualification or relegation
1	Zürich	36	23	6	7	67	32	+35	75	Swiss champions Qualification to Champions League third qualifying round
2	Basel	36	22	8	6	77	40	+37	74	2006–07 Swiss Cup winners Qualification to UEFA Cup second qualifying round
3	Sion	36	17	9	10	57	42	+15	60	Qualification to UEFA Cup second qualifying round
4	Young Boys	36	17	8	11	52	42	+10	59	Qualification to UEFA Cup first qualifying round
5	St. Gallen	36	14	13	9	47	44	+3	55	Qualification to Intertoto Cup second round
6	Grasshopper	36	13	11	12	54	41	+13	50	
7	Thun	36	10	7	19	30	58	−28	37	
8	Luzern	36	8	9	19	31	58	−27	33	
9	Aarau	36	6	8	22	28	55	−27	26	To Promotion/relegation playoff
10	Schaffhausen	36	4	13	19	27	58	−31	25	Relegation to 2007–08 Swiss Challenge League

Source: RSSSF
Rules for classification: 1) points; 2) goal difference; 3) number of goals scored.

== Challenge League ==
=== Final league table ===
Pos	Team	Pld	W	D	L	GF	GA	GD	Pts	Promotion or relegation
1	Neuchâtel Xamax (C, P)	34	23	7	4	73	28	+45	76	Promotion to 2007–08 Swiss Super League
2	Bellinzona	34	21	7	6	58	26	+32	70	Qualification for Promotion/relegation playoff
3	Kriens	34	20	7	7	65	36	+29	67	
4	Chiasso	34	16	10	8	55	39	+16	58	
5	Concordia Basel	34	17	6	11	59	49	+10	57	
6	Winterthur	34	17	4	13	60	47	+13	55	
7	Servette	34	15	8	11	63	51	+12	53	
8	Wil	34	12	10	12	56	50	+6	46	
9	Vaduz	34	12	10	12	57	52	+5	46	
10	Chaux-de-Fonds	34	12	7	15	49	49	0	43	
11	Locarno	34	11	9	14	44	58	−14	42	
12	Yverdon-Sport	34	12	6	16	45	60	−15	42	
13	Lugano	34	11	8	15	42	46	−4	41	
14	Lausanne Sports	34	10	9	15	44	51	−7	39	
15	Delémont	34	9	6	19	39	63	−24	33	
16	Wohlen	34	7	10	17	39	64	−25	31	
17	Baulmes (R)	34	7	9	18	30	63	−33	30	Relegated to 2007–08 Swiss 1. Liga
18	YF Juventus (R)	34	4	7	23	29	75	−46	19	Relegated to 2007–08 Swiss 1. Liga

Source: RSSSF
Rules for classification: 1) points; 2) goal difference; 3) number of goals scored.
(C) Champions; (P) Promoted; (R) Relegated

=== Promotion/relegation playoff ===
As 9th-placed team of the 2006–07 Swiss Super League FC Aarau played a two-legged play-off against Challenge League runners-up AC Bellinzona for a spot in the 2007–08 Super League.

30 May 2007
20:15 CEST

Bellinzona	1–2	Aarau
Gomes 47'		Rogério 21'; Mesbah 36'

Stadio Comunale, Bellinzona
Attendance: 7,537
Referee: (Switzerland) Claudio Circhetta
3 June 2007
16:00 CEST

Aarau	3–1	Bellinzona
Mesbah 68', 89'; Sermeter 90+1'		Ianu 52'

Stadion Brügglifeld, Aarau
Attendance: 9,250
Referee: (Switzerland) Guido Wildhaber

Aarau won 5–2 on aggregate and retain their place in the Swiss Super League. Bellinzona remain in the Swiss Challenge League.

== 1. Liga ==
=== Group 1 ===
Pos	Team	Pld	W	D	L	GF	GA	GD	Pts	Qualification or relegation
1	Étoile Carouge FC	30	18	10	2	60	13	+47	64	Play-off to Challenge League
2	Urania Genève Sport	30	18	7	5	60	32	+28	61	Play-off to Challenge League
3	FC Stade Nyonnais	30	17	6	7	54	34	+20	57	Play-off to Challenge League
4	Sion U-21	30	15	7	8	49	37	+12	52	
5	ES FC Malley	30	13	8	9	54	45	+9	47	
6	FC Naters	30	13	4	13	52	55	−3	43	
7	FC Fribourg	30	9	14	7	43	39	+4	41	
8	FC Echallens	30	10	10	10	40	38	+2	40	
9	FC Bex	30	10	6	14	44	54	−10	36	
10	FC La Tour/Le Pâquier	30	8	9	13	51	58	−7	33	
11	SC Düdingen	30	9	5	16	31	53	−22	32	
12	FC Bulle	30	8	7	15	43	48	−5	31	
13	FC Meyrin	30	7	10	13	35	48	−13	31	
14	FC Serrières	30	7	10	13	32	50	−18	31	
15	FC Martigny-Sports	30	7	9	14	33	47	−14	30	Relegation to 2. Liga Interregional
16	CS Chênois	30	6	8	16	34	64	−30	26	Relegation to 2. Liga Interregional

Source: RSSSF

=== Group 2 ===
Pos	Team	Pld	W	D	L	GF	GA	GD	Pts	Qualification or relegation
1	FC Basel U-21	30	23	6	1	100	23	+77	75	Not eligible to Play-off
2	Biel-Bienne	30	19	8	3	60	18	+42	65	Play-off to Challenge League
3	FC Solothurn	30	18	8	4	55	22	+33	62	Play-off to Challenge League
4	SC Cham	30	16	6	8	46	33	+13	54	Play-off to Challenge League
5	SC Zofingen	30	13	6	11	49	49	0	45	
6	Luzern U-21	30	11	8	11	48	51	−3	41	
7	FC Wangen bei Olten	30	12	5	13	48	58	−10	41	
8	SV Muttenz	30	11	8	11	53	54	−1	41	
9	Young Boys U-21	30	10	8	12	42	51	−9	38	
10	Zug 94	30	9	9	12	37	40	−3	36	
11	FC Laufen	30	8	10	12	39	39	0	34	
12	FC Olten	30	9	7	14	38	56	−18	34	
13	FC Grenchen	30	9	5	16	43	65	−22	32	
14	FC Münsingen	30	7	11	12	33	40	−7	32	
15	SC Dornach	30	5	4	21	33	72	−39	19	Relegation to 2. Liga Interregional
16	FC Kickers Luzern	30	3	5	22	32	85	−53	14	Relegation to 2. Liga Interregional

Source: RSSSF

=== Group 3 ===
Pos	Team	Pld	W	D	L	GF	GA	GD	Pts	Qualification or relegation
1	Red Star Zürich	30	18	5	7	55	27	+28	59	Play-off to Challenge League
2	FC Zürich U-21	30	18	3	9	53	32	+21	57	Not eligible to Play-off
3	FC Gossau	30	16	6	8	61	35	+26	54	Play-off to Challenge League
4	GC Biaschesi	30	14	9	7	46	34	+12	51	
5	St. Gallen U-21	30	14	6	10	43	36	+7	48	
6	FC Tuggen	30	13	6	11	44	48	−4	45	
7	Grasshoppers U-21	30	12	9	9	64	43	+21	45	
8	FC Herisau	30	11	8	11	42	36	+6	41	
9	Winterthur U-21	30	11	8	11	51	46	+5	41	
10	FC Rapperswil-Jona	30	12	4	14	53	52	+1	40	
11	FC Mendrisio-Stabio	30	8	9	13	34	37	−3	33	
12	FC Brugg	30	8	7	15	41	59	−18	31	
13	FC Baden	30	9	4	17	25	49	−24	31	
14	FC Kreuzlingen	30	8	7	15	36	54	−18	31	
15	FC Seefeld Zürich	30	7	9	14	33	55	−22	30	Relegation to 2. Liga Interregional
16	FC Chur 97	30	8	6	16	32	60	−28	30	Relegation to 2. Liga Interregional

Source: RSSSF

=== Play-off to Challenge League ===
1st round

Team 1	Score	Team 2
SC Cham	1–1	Étoile Carouge FC
Étoile Carouge FC	2–2	SC Cham
Urania Genève Sport	3–2	Red Star Zürich
Red Star Zürich	2–2	Urania Genève Sport
FC Gossau	1–2	FC Solothurn
FC Solothurn	0–3	FC Gossau
FC Stade Nyonnais	1–1	Biel-Bienne
Biel-Bienne	1–0	FC Stade Nyonnais

Final round

Team 1	Score	Team 2
SC Cham	1–1	Biel-Bienne
Biel-Bienne	1–2	SC Cham
FC Gossau	1 – 0	Urania Genève Sport
Urania Genève Sport	2 – 5	FC Gossau

SC Cham and FC Gossau are promoted to the 2007–08 Challenge League.

== Swiss Cup final ==
FC Basel beat FC Wil 3–1 in the first semi-final, FC Luzern beat FC Zürich 3–2 in the other and thus they qualified to play each other on Whit Monday 28 May 2007 in the final.

28 May 2007
15:00

Basel	1–0	Luzern
Majstorović (yellow card) 74'; Majstorović 90+3' (pen.)	SFV summary	(yellow card) 34' Diethelm; (red card) 90+1' Zibung

Stade de Suisse, Wankdorf, Bern
Attendance: 30,000 (sold out)
Referee: (Switzerland) Nicole Petignat

== Sources ==
- Switzerland 2006–07 at RSSSF
- Josef Zindel (2018). FC Basel 1893. Die ersten 125 Jahre (in German). Basel: Friedrich Reinhardt Verlag. ISBN 978-3-7245-2305-5.

Preceded by 2005–06	Seasons in Swiss football	Succeeded by 2007–08
