= 2006–07 FC Luzern season =

FC Luzern
- Chairman: Walter Stierli
- Manager: Ciriaco Sforza
- Stadium: Stadion Allmend
- Swiss Super League: 8th
- Swiss Cup: Runners-up
- Top goalscorer: League: Jean-Michel Tchouga (10); All: Jean-Michel Tchouga (10)
- Average home league attendance: 7,733
- Biggest win: Kölliken 0–8 Luzern
- Biggest defeat: Grasshopper 5–0 Luzern; Luzern 1–6 Grasshopper

The 2006–07 season was the 82nd season in the history of Fussball-Club Luzern and the club's first season back in the top flight of Swiss football.

== Competitions ==
=== Overall record ===
| Competition | First match | Last match | Starting round | Final position | Record | | | | | | | |
| Competition | First match | Last match | Starting round | Final position | Pld | W | D | L | GF | GA | GD | Win % |
|---|---|---|---|---|---|---|---|---|---|---|---|---|
| Swiss Super League | 19 July 2006 | 24 May 2007 | Matchday 1 | 8th | 36 | 8 | 9 | 19 | 31 | 58 | −27 | 22.22 |
| Swiss Cup | 26 August 2006 | 28 May 2007 | Round of 64 | Runners-up | 6 | 5 | 0 | 1 | 20 | 4 | +16 | 83.33 |
| Total | | | | | 42 | 13 | 9 | 20 | 51 | 62 | −11 | 30.95 |

Source: Competitions

=== Swiss Super League ===
==== League table ====
| Pos | Team | Pld | W | D | L | GF | GA | GD | Pts | Qualification or relegation |
|---|---|---|---|---|---|---|---|---|---|---|
| 6 | Grasshopper | 36 | 13 | 11 | 12 | 54 | 41 | +13 | 50 | |
| 7 | Thun | 36 | 10 | 7 | 19 | 30 | 58 | −28 | 37 | |
| 8 | Luzern | 36 | 8 | 9 | 19 | 31 | 58 | −27 | 33 | |
| 9 | Aarau | 36 | 6 | 8 | 22 | 28 | 55 | −27 | 26 | Qualification to relegation play-off |
| 10 | Schaffhausen (R) | 36 | 4 | 13 | 19 | 27 | 58 | −31 | 25 | Relegation to Swiss Challenge League |

Source: RSSSF
Rules for classification: 1) points; 2) goal difference; 3) number of goals scored.
(R) Relegated

==== Results summary ====
| Overall | | | | | | | | Home | | | | | | Away | | | | | |
| Pld | W | D | L | GF | GA | GD | Pts | W | D | L | GF | GA | GD | W | D | L | GF | GA | GD |
|---|---|---|---|---|---|---|---|---|---|---|---|---|---|---|---|---|---|---|---|
| 36 | 8 | 9 | 19 | 31 | 58 | −27 | 33 | 7 | 5 | 6 | 20 | 23 | −3 | 1 | 4 | 13 | 11 | 35 | −24 |

Source: Swiss Super League

==== Results by round ====
| Round | 1 | 2 | 3 | 4 | 5 | 6 | 7 | 8 | 9 | 10 | 11 | 12 | 13 | 14 | 15 | 16 | 17 | 18 | 19 | 20 | 21 | 22 | 23 | 24 | 25 | 26 | 27 | 28 | 29 | 30 | 31 | 32 | 33 | 34 | 35 | 36 |
|---|---|---|---|---|---|---|---|---|---|---|---|---|---|---|---|---|---|---|---|---|---|---|---|---|---|---|---|---|---|---|---|---|---|---|---|---|
| Ground | H | A | A | H | A | H | A | H | A | A | H | H | A | H | A | H | A | H | H | A | H | A | H | A | H | A | H | A | H | A | H | A | H | A | H | A |
| Result | L | L | L | W | L | D | L | W | D | L | D | W | W | L | D | L | L | W | W | L | W | D | D | L | D | L | L | L | W | D | L | L | D | L | L | L |
| Position | 10 | 10 | 10 | 8 | 9 | 8 | 9 | 7 | 7 | 8 | 7 | 7 | 7 | 7 | 7 | 7 | 7 | 7 | 7 | 7 | 7 | 7 | 7 | 7 | 7 | 7 | 7 | 7 | 7 | 7 | 7 | 7 | 7 | 7 | 8 | 8 |

Source: World Football
A = Away; H = Home; W = Win; D = Draw; L = Loss

==== Matches ====
| 19 July 2006 Round 1 | Luzern | 0–3 | Zürich | Lucerne |
| 20:15 CEST (UTC+2) | | | | Stadium: Stadion Allmend; Attendance: 9,000; Referee: Claudio Circhetta |

| 23 July 2006 Round 2 | Sion | 3–2 | Luzern | Sion |
| 16:00 CEST (UTC+2) | | | | Stadium: Stade Tourbillon; Attendance: 10,500; Referee: Jérôme Laperrière |

| 30 July 2006 Round 3 | Young Boys | 3–2 | Luzern | Bern |
| 16:00 CEST (UTC+2) | | | | Stadium: Stade de Suisse; Attendance: 13,424; Referee: Massimo Busacca |

| 5 August 2006 Round 4 | Luzern | 2–1 | Aarau | Lucerne |
| 17:45 CEST (UTC+2) | | | | Stadium: Stadion Allmend; Attendance: 7,200; Referee: René Rogalla |

| 13 August 2006 Round 5 | Grasshopper | 2–0 | Luzern | Zürich |
| 16:00 CEST (UTC+2) | | | | Stadium: Letzigrund |

| 19 August 2006 Round 6 | Luzern | 1–1 | Schaffhausen | Lucerne |
| 17:45 CEST (UTC+2) | | | | Stadium: Stadion Allmend |

| 10 September 2006 Round 7 | St. Gallen | 2–0 | Luzern | St. Gallen |
| 16:00 CEST (UTC+2) | | | | Stadium: Espenmoos |

| 18 September 2006 Round 8 | Luzern | 2–0 | Basel | Stadion Allmend, Luzern |
| 19:45 | Tchouga 62' (1:0); Paquito 78' (2:0); (yellow card) 89' Zibung | Summary | (yellow card) 11' Ba; (yellow card) 73' Berner; (yellow card) 86' Kavelashvili | Attendance: 10,089; Referee: (Switzerland) Massimo Busacca |

| 24 September 2006 Round 9 | Thun | 1–1 | Luzern | Thun |
| 16:00 CEST (UTC+2) | | | | Stadium: Stadion Lachen |

| 4 October 2006 Round 10 | Zürich | 2–1 | Luzern | Zürich |
| 19:45 CEST (UTC+2) | | | | Stadium: Letzigrund |

| 14 October 2006 Round 11 | Luzern | 1–1 | Sion | Lucerne |
| 17:45 CEST (UTC+2) | | | | Stadium: Stadion Allmend |

| 22 October 2006 Round 12 | Luzern | 3–1 | Young Boys | Lucerne |
| 16:00 CEST (UTC+2) | | | | Stadium: Stadion Allmend |

| 29 October 2006 Round 13 | Aarau | 0–1 | Luzern | Aarau |
| 16:00 CET (UTC+1) | | | | Stadium: Stadion Brügglifeld |

| 8 November 2006 Round 14 | Luzern | 0–1 | Grasshopper | Lucerne |
| 19:45 CET (UTC+1) | | | | Stadium: Stadion Allmend |

| 18 November 2006 Round 15 | Schaffhausen | 1–1 | Luzern | Schaffhausen |
| 17:45 CET (UTC+1) | | | | Stadium: Stadion Breite |

| 25 November 2006 Round 16 | Luzern | 0–1 | St. Gallen | Lucerne |
| 17:45 CET (UTC+1) | | | | Stadium: Stadion Allmend |

| 4 December 2006 Round 17 | Basel | 3–0 | Luzern | St. Jakob-Park, Basel |
| 19:45 | Ergić 2' (1:0); Rakitić 55' (2:0); Chipperfield 72' (3:0) | Summary | (yellow card) 65' N'Tiamoah | Attendance: 19,200; Referee: (Switzerland) Nicole Petignat |

| 10 December 2006 Round 18 | Luzern | 2–1 | Thun | Lucerne |
| 16:00 CET (UTC+1) | | | | Stadium: Stadion Allmend |

| 11 February 2007 Round 19 | Luzern | 2–0 | Sion | Lucerne |
| 16:00 CET (UTC+1) | | | | Stadium: Stadion Allmend |

| 17 February 2007 Round 20 | Basel | 1–0 | Luzern | St. Jakob-Park, Basel |
| 17:45 | Petrić 40' (pen. 1:0); Smiljanić (yellow card) 92' | Summary | (yellow card) 31' Seoane; (yellow card) 57' C. Lustenberger; (yellow card) 71' Mettomo; (yellow card) 76' (yellow-red card) 78' Cantaluppi; (yellow card) 78' Dal Santo; (yellow card) 84' Makanaki | Attendance: 19,851; Referee: (Switzerland) Cyril Zimmermann |

| 24 February 2007 Round 21 | Luzern | 2–0 | Zürich | Lucerne |
| 17:45 CET (UTC+1) | | | | Stadium: Stadion Allmend |

| 3 March 2007 Round 22 | St. Gallen | 0–0 | Luzern | St. Gallen |
| 17:45 CET (UTC+1) | | | | Stadium: Espenmoos |

| 11 March 2007 Round 23 | Luzern | 1–1 | Young Boys | Lucerne |
| 16:00 CET (UTC+1) | | | | Stadium: Stadion Allmend |

| 17 March 2007 Round 24 | Grasshopper | 5–0 | Luzern | Zürich |
| 17:45 CET (UTC+1) | | | | Stadium: Letzigrund |

| 31 March 2007 Round 25 | Luzern | 0–0 | Schaffhausen | Lucerne |
| 17:45 CET (UTC+1) | | | | Stadium: Stadion Allmend |

| 9 April 2007 Round 26 | Aarau | 4–1 | Luzern | Aarau |
| 16:00 CEST (UTC+2) | | | | Stadium: Stadion Brügglifeld |

| 14 April 2007 Round 27 | Luzern | 1–2 | Thun | Lucerne |
| 17:45 CEST (UTC+2) | | | | Stadium: Stadion Allmend |

| 18 April 2007 Round 28 | Thun | 2–1 | Luzern | Thun |
| 19:45 CEST (UTC+2) | | | | Stadium: Stadion Lachen |

| 22 April 2007 Round 29 | Luzern | 1–0 | Aarau | Lucerne |
| 16:00 CEST (UTC+2) | | | | Stadium: Stadion Allmend |

| 29 April 2007 Round 30 | Schaffhausen | 0–0 | Luzern | Schaffhausen |
| 16:00 CEST (UTC+2) | | | | Stadium: Stadion Breite |

| 5 May 2007 Round 31 | Luzern | 1–6 | Grasshopper | Lucerne |
| 17:45 CEST (UTC+2) | | | | Stadium: Stadion Allmend |

| 9 May 2007 Round 32 | Young Boys | 3–1 | Luzern | Bern |
| 19:45 CEST (UTC+2) | | | | Stadium: Stade de Suisse |

| 13 May 2007 Round 33 | Luzern | 1–1 | St. Gallen | Lucerne |
| 16:00 CEST (UTC+2) | | | | Stadium: Stadion Allmend |

| 16 May 2007 Round 34 | Zürich | 2–0 | Luzern | Zürich |
| 20:15 CEST (UTC+2) | | | | Stadium: Letzigrund |

| 19 May 2007 Round 35 | Luzern | 0–3 | Basel | Stadion Allmend, Luzern |
| 17:45 | Bader (yellow card) 13'; F. Lustenberger (yellow card) 39' | Summary | 4' (0:1) Sterjovski; 10' (0:2) Ergić; 66' (0:3) Rakitić | Attendance: 9,558; Referee: (Switzerland) Massimo Busacca |

| 24 May 2007 Round 36 | Sion | 2–0 | Luzern | Sion |
| 17:15 CEST (UTC+2) | | | | Stadium: Stade Tourbillon |

=== Swiss Cup ===
| 26 August 2006 Round of 64 | FC Kölliken | 0–8 | Luzern | Kölliken |
| 17:30 CEST (UTC+2) |

| 1 October 2006 Round of 32 | SC Kriens | 0–4 | Luzern | Kriens |
| 14:30 CEST (UTC+2) |

| 12 November 2006 Round of 16 | Luzern | 2–0 | Schaffhausen | Lucerne |
| 14:30 CET (UTC+1) | | | | Stadium: Stadion Allmend |

| 14 March 2007 Quarter-finals | Luzern | 3–1 | Grasshopper | Lucerne |
| 19:45 CET (UTC+1) | | | | Stadium: Stadion Allmend |

| 26 April 2007 Semi-finals | Zürich | 2–3 | Luzern | Zürich |
| 20:45 CEST (UTC+2) | | | | Stadium: Letzigrund |

| 28 May 2007 Final | Basel | 1–0 | Luzern | Bern |
| 15:00 CEST (UTC+2) | | Report | | Stadium: Stade de Suisse |
