= 2005–06 in Swiss football =

Football in Switzerland
- Season: 2005–06

Men's football
- Super League: Zürich
- Challenge League: Luzern
- 1. Liga: Group 1: Servette; Group 2: Biel-Bienne; Group 3: Tuggen
- Swiss Cup: Sion

Women's football
- Swiss Women's Super League: SC LUwin.ch Luzern
- Swiss Cup: FFC Zürich Seebach

The following is a summary of the 2005–06 season of competitive football in Switzerland.

== Super League ==
=== Final league table ===
Pos	Team	Pld	W	D	L	GF	GA	GD	Pts	Qualification or relegation
1	Zürich (C)	36	23	9	4	86	36	+50	78	Qualification to Champions League second qualifying round
2	Basel	36	23	9	4	87	42	+45	78	Qualification to UEFA Cup first qualifying round
3	Young Boys	36	17	11	8	60	46	+14	62	Qualification to UEFA Cup first qualifying round
4	Grasshopper	36	14	13	9	44	33	+11	55	Qualification to Intertoto Cup second round
5	Thun	36	14	7	15	50	53	−3	49	
6	St. Gallen	36	11	7	18	51	56	−5	40	
7	Aarau	36	8	11	17	29	63	−34	35	
8	Schaffhausen	36	7	12	17	32	55	−23	33	
9	Neuchâtel Xamax (R)	36	9	6	21	41	70	−29	33	Qualification to relegation play-off
10	Yverdon-Sport (R)	36	9	5	22	38	64	−26	32	Relegation to Swiss Challenge League

Source: RSSSF
Rules for classification: 1) points; 2) goal difference; 3) number of goals scored.
(C) Champions; (R) Relegated

== Challenge League ==
=== Final league table ===
Pos	Team	Pld	W	D	L	GF	GA	GD	Pts	Promotion or relegation
1	FC Luzern (C, P)	34	24	7	3	69	33	+36	79	Promotion to 2006–07 Swiss Super League
2	FC Sion (P)	34	22	6	6	61	24	+37	72	Qualification for Promotion play-off
3	FC Lausanne-Sport	34	20	8	6	64	42	+22	68	
4	FC Chiasso	34	17	8	9	51	31	+20	59	
5	FC La Chaux-de-Fonds	34	15	13	6	60	44	+16	58	
6	FC Wohlen	34	15	7	12	50	40	+10	52	
7	FC Wil	34	14	9	11	61	55	+6	51	
8	FC Vaduz	34	13	7	14	57	54	+3	46	
9	AC Bellinzona	34	12	10	12	43	45	−2	46	
10	AC Lugano	34	10	11	13	41	52	−11	41	
11	FC Baulmes	34	9	13	12	36	45	−9	40	
12	FC Concordia Basel	34	10	9	15	44	57	−13	39	
13	SC Kriens	34	9	12	13	42	56	−14	39	
14	FC Winterthur	34	10	7	17	62	53	+9	37	
15	SC YF Juventus	34	8	14	12	39	53	−14	35 (Note: 3 points deducted?)	
16	FC Locarno	34	7	7	20	35	60	−25	28	
17	FC Baden (R)	34	6	9	19	30	59	−29	27	Relegated to 2006–07 Swiss 1. Liga
18	FC Meyrin (R)	34	1	11	22	26	68	−42	14	Relegated to 2006–07 Swiss 1. Liga

Source: rsssf.com
(C) Champions; (P) Promoted; (R) Relegated

=== Promotion/relegation play-offs ===
The ninth-placed team in the 2005–06 Swiss Super League, Neuchâtel Xamax, played a two-legged play-off against the Challenge League runners-up, Sion, for a spot in the 2006–07 Super League.

18 May 2006
19:30 CEST

Sion	0–0	Neuchâtel Xamax

Stade Tourbillon, Sion
Attendance: 12,300
Referee: Massimo Busacca

21 May 2006
16:00 CEST

Neuchâtel Xamax	0–3	Sion
		Vogt 38', 59'; Gaspoz 68'

Stade de la Maladière, Neuchâtel
Attendance: 7,000
Referee: René Rogalla

Sion won 3–0 on aggregate and are promoted. Neuchâtel Xamax lose and are relegated.

== 1. Liga ==
=== Group 1 ===
Pos	Team	Pld	W	D	L	GF	GA	GD	Pts	Qualification or relegation
1	Servette FC	30	21	5	4	82	32	+50	68	Play-off to Challenge League
2	Étoile Carouge FC	30	16	8	6	66	27	+39	56	Play-off to Challenge League
3	Urania Genève Sport	30	16	7	7	55	39	+16	55	Play-off to Challenge League
4	ES FC Malley	30	16	6	8	61	34	+27	54	
5	FC Stade Nyonnais	30	14	6	10	57	51	+6	48	
6	FC Echallens	30	11	11	8	47	43	+4	44	
7	CS Chênois	30	11	8	11	50	54	−4	41	
8	FC Bulle	30	11	7	12	46	50	−4	40	
9	FC Fribourg	30	9	12	9	50	48	+2	39	
10	FC Serrières	30	9	11	10	33	33	0	38	
11	FC Martigny-Sports	30	10	7	13	40	50	−10	37	
12	FC Bex	30	10	7	13	39	56	−17	37	
13	SC Düdingen	30	8	7	15	41	65	−24	31	
14	FC Naters	30	7	7	16	42	60	−18	28	
15	Signal FC Bernex-Confignon	30	3	12	15	37	62	−25	21	Relegation to 2. Liga Interregional
16	Grand-Lancy FC	30	4	7	19	30	72	−42	19	Relegation to 2. Liga Interregional

Source: Erste Liga official website
Rules for classification: 1) Points; 2) Goal difference within the league or play-off if for qualifiers.

=== Group 2 ===
Pos	Team	Pld	W	D	L	GF	GA	GD	Pts	Qualification or relegation
1	FC Biel-Bienne	30	20	8	2	65	20	+45	68	Play-off to Challenge League
2	SR Delémont	30	14	10	6	56	40	+16	52	Play-off to Challenge League
3	Basel U-21	30	14	7	9	78	48	+30	49	
4	FC Kickers Luzern	30	13	10	7	49	41	+8	49	
5	FC Solothurn	30	12	10	8	51	40	+11	46	
6	SC Zofingen	30	10	10	10	52	55	−3	40	
7	FC Grenchen	30	9	11	10	51	46	+5	38	
8	FC Wangen bei Olten	30	10	8	12	51	55	−4	38	
9	FC Laufen	30	9	9	12	37	45	−8	36	
10	Young Boys U-21	30	8	11	11	44	45	−1	35	
11	FC Münsingen	30	7	14	9	37	42	−5	35	
12	SC Dornach	30	10	5	15	42	63	−21	35	
13	SV Muttenz	30	9	8	13	43	67	−24	35	
14	Luzern U-21	30	8	10	12	45	53	−8	34	
15	FC Schötz	30	7	10	13	46	64	−18	31	Relegation to 2. Liga Interregional
16	SC Buochs	30	5	9	16	39	62	−23	24	Relegation to 2. Liga Interregional

Source: Erste Liga official website
Rules for classification: 1) Points; 2) Goal difference within the league or play-off if for qualifiers.

=== Group 3 ===
Pos	Team	Pld	W	D	L	GF	GA	GD	Pts	Qualification or relegation
1	FC Tuggen	30	21	4	5	76	35	+41	67	Play-off to Challenge League
2	FC Red Star Zürich	30	16	8	6	57	41	+16	56	Play-off to Challenge League
3	FC Herisau	30	15	8	7	55	32	+23	53	Play-off to Challenge League
4	FC Kreuzlingen	30	15	5	10	49	44	+5	50	
5	Zürich U-21	30	13	10	7	52	32	+20	49	
6	Zug 94	30	14	7	9	67	57	+10	49	
7	Grasshopper Club U-21	30	13	6	11	60	41	+19	45	
8	FC Seefeld Zürich	30	12	7	11	42	41	+1	43	
9	GC Biaschesi	30	12	5	13	44	49	−5	41	
10	SC Cham	30	10	10	10	50	49	+1	40	
11	FC Brugg	30	11	6	13	37	39	−2	39	
12	FC Rapperswil-Jona	30	10	6	14	46	55	−9	36	
13	St. Gallen U-21	30	9	7	14	44	52	−8	34	
14	FC Mendrisio	30	8	10	12	35	49	−14	34	
15	FC Altstetten	30	6	6	18	36	74	−38	24	Relegation to 2. Liga Interregional
16	FC Frauenfeld	30	1	3	26	29	89	−60	6	Relegation to 2. Liga Interregional

Source: Erste Liga official website
Rules for classification: 1) Points; 2) Goal difference within the league or play-off if for qualifiers.

=== Promotion play-offs ===
==== Qualification round ====
Team 1	Score	Team 2
Herisau	1–3	Servette
Servette	3–0	Herisau

Servette win 6–1 on aggregate

Team 1	Score	Team 2
Delémont	3–0	Tuggen
Tuggen	0–4	Delémont

Delémont win 7–0 on aggregate

Team 1	Score	Team 2
Red Star	1–0	Étoile Carouge
Étoile Carouge	4–1	Red Star

Étoile Carouge win 4–2 on aggregate

Team 1	Score	Team 2
UGS	2–0	Biel-Bienne
Biel-Bienne	3–1	UGS

3–3 on aggregate UGS win on away goals

==== Final round ====
Team 1	Score	Team 2
Delémont	1–0	Étoile Carouge
Étoile Carouge	1–1	Delémont

Delémont win 2–1 on aggregate and are promoted to the 2006–07 Challenge League.

Team 1	Score	Team 2
UGS	0–3	Servette
Servette	2–1	UGS

Servette win 5–1 on aggregate and are promoted to the 2006–07 Challenge League.

== Swiss Cup ==
BSC Young Boys beat FC Zürich 4–1 in the first drawn semi-final and FC Sion beat FC Winterthur 1–0 in the second semi-final. The winner of the first drawn semi-final is considered as home team. The final was played on 17 April 2006 and took place at Stade de Suisse, Wankdorf in the Swiss capital Bern.

=== Final ===
17 April 2006
15:00

BSC Young Boys	1 – 1 (a.e.t.)	FC Sion
Varela 16'	SFL summary	55' Obradović
Penalties
João Paulo (penalty missed); H. Yakin (penalty scored); Calvano (penalty scored); Raimondi (penalty scored)	3 – 5	(penalty scored) Obradović; (penalty scored) Di Zenzo; (penalty scored) Crettenand; (penalty scored) Gaspoz; (penalty scored) Regazzoni

Stade de Suisse, Wankdorf, Bern
Attendance: 30,659
Referee: (Switzerland) Reto Rutz

== Swiss Clubs in Europe ==
- Basel as 2004–05 champions: Champions League third qualifying round
- Thun as runner-up: Champions League second qualifying round
- Grasshoppers as third placed team: UEFA Cup second qualifying round
- Zürich as 2004–05 Swiss Cup winners: UEFA Cup second qualifying round
- Young Boys as fourth placed team: Intertoto Cup second round
- Xamax as sixth placed team: Intertoto Cup first round
- Vaduz as 2004–05 Liechtenstein Cup winners: UEFA Cup first qualifying round

=== Basel ===
==== Champions League ====
===== Third qualifying round =====
10 August 2005 First Leg	Basel (Switzerland)	2 – 1	(Germany) Werder Bremen	St. Jakob-Park, Basel
20:45	D. Degen 28' (1:0); Rossi 52' (2:0); Quennoz (yellow card) 84'	UEFA summary FCB summary	(yellow card) 23' Jelle Van Damme; (yellow card) 62' Davala; 74' (2:1) Klose	Attendance: 28,101; Referee: (Belgium) Paul Allaerts, (KBVB)

24 August 2005 Second Leg	Werder Bremen (Germany)	3 – 0	(Switzerland) Basel	Weserstadion, Bremen
20:45	Klose (yellow card) 28' (yellow-red card) 79'; Klasnić 65' (1:0); Borowski 68' (pen. 2:0); Klasnić 73' (3:0)	UEFA summary FCB summary	(yellow card) 2' D. Degen; (yellow card) 40' Eduardo	Attendance: 30,000; Referee: (Denmark) Kim Milton Nielsen (DBU)

Werder Bremen won 4–2 on aggregate. Basel transfer to 2005–06 UEFA Cup

==== UEFA Cup ====
===== First round =====
15 September 2005 First Leg	Basel (Switzerland)	5 – 0	(Bosnia and Herzegovina) Široki Brijeg	St. Jakob-Park, Basel
19:30	Delgado 10' (1:0); Ergić 70' (2:0); Delgado 78' (3:0); Eduardo 85' (4:0); Delgado 88' (5:0)	UEFA summary FCB summary	(yellow card) 15' (yellow-red card) 53' Rezic; (yellow card) 23' Kozul	Attendance: 14,458; Referee: (Hungary) Zsolt Szabo (MLSZ)

29 September 2005 Second Leg	Široki Brijeg (Bosnia and Herzegovina)	0 – 1	(Switzerland) Basel	Stadion Pecara, Široki Brijeg
19:30		UEFA summary FCB summary	Petrić 8' (0:1)	Referee: (Finland) Tony Asumaa (SPL)

Basel won 6-0 on aggregate.

===== Group stage / Group E =====
20 October 2005 Matchday 1	Basel (Switzerland)	0 – 2	(France) Strasbourg	St. Jakob-Park, Basel
19:30	Müller (red card) 30'; Degen (yellow card) 55'; Chipperfield (yellow card) 76'	UEFA summary FCB summary	15' (0:1) Diané; 25' (0:2) Boka; (yellow card) 68' Johansen	Attendance: 16,623; Referee: (England) Mark Halsey (FA)

3 November 2005 Matchday 2	Red Star Belgrade (Serbia and Montenegro)	1 – 2	(Switzerland) Basel	Stadion FK Crvena zvezda, Belgrade
17:00	Purović 25' (1:0); Mladenović (yellow card) 54'; Basta (yellow card) 59'; Dudić (yellow card) 65'	UEFA summary FCB summary	30' (pen. 1:1) Delgado; (yellow card) 57' Delgado; (yellow card) 77' Zanni; 88' (1:2) Rossi	Attendance: 0 (closed doors); Referee: (Denmark) Knud Erik Fisker (DBU)

1 December 2005 Matchday 4	Basel (Switzerland)	4 – 3	(Norway) Tromsø	St. Jakob-Park, Basel
20:45	Petrić 17' (1:1); Delgado 61' (2:3); Chipperfield 67' (3:3); Degen 75' (4:3)	UEFA summary FCB summary	2' (0:1) Strand; 19' (1:2) Årst; 29' (1:3) Strand; (yellow card) 82' Kibebe	Attendance: 14,887; Referee: (Poland) Krzysztof Slupik (PZPN)

14 December 2005 Matchday 5	Roma (Italy)	3 – 1	(Switzerland) Basel	Stadio Olimpico, Rome
20:45	Taddei 12' (1:0); Totti 45' (2:0); Nonda 49' (3:0); Chivu (yellow card) 61'	UEFA summary FCB summary	78' (3:1) Petrić; (yellow card) 82' Eduardo	Attendance: 16,000; Referee: (Germany) Helmut Fleischer (DFB)

Pos	Team	Pld	W	D	L	GF	GA	GD	Pts	Qualification	STR	ROM	BSL	RSB	TRO
1	(France) Strasbourg	4	2	2	0	7	3	+4	8	Advance to knockout stage	—	—	—	2–2	2–0
2	(Italy) Roma	4	2	1	1	7	6	+1	7	Advance to knockout stage	1–1	—	3–1	—	—
3	(Switzerland) Basel	4	2	0	2	7	9	−2	6	Advance to knockout stage	0–2	—	—	—	4–3
4	(Serbia and Montenegro) Red Star Belgrade	4	1	1	2	7	8	−1	4		—	3–1	1–2	—	—
5	(Norway) Tromsø	4	1	0	3	7	9	−2	3		—	1–2	—	3–1	—

===== Round of 32 =====
15 February 2006 First Leg	Basel (Switzerland)	1 – 0	(France) Monaco	St. Jakob-Park, Basel
18:00	Degen 78' (1:0)	UEFA summary FCB summary		Attendance: 14,143; Referee: (Netherlands) Pieter Vink (KNVB)
Note: No yellow cards

23 February 2006 Second Leg	Monaco (France)	1 – 1	(Switzerland) Basel	Stade Louis II, Monaco
20:45	Bernardi (yellow card) 9'; Vieri 21' (pen. 1:0); Chevantón (yellow card) 76'	UEFA summary FCB summary	(yellow card) 38' Smiljanić; 56' (1:1) Majstorović; (yellow card) 56' Majstorović; (yellow card) 71' Zanni	Attendance: 11,955; Referee: (Cyprus) Costas Kapitanis (CFA)

Basel won 2–1 on aggregate.

===== Round of 16 =====
9 March 2006 First Leg	Basel (Switzerland)	2 – 0	(France) Strasbourg	St. Jakob-Park, Basel
20:15	Delgado 8' (1:0); Ba (yellow card) 22'; Kuzmanović 89' (2:0)	UEFA summary FCB summary	(yellow card) 14' P. Farnerud; (yellow card) 57' Lacour; (yellow card) 69' Deroff; (yellow card) 73' Abdessadki; (yellow card) 90+2' Bellaïd	Attendance: 14,243; Referee: (Italy) Stefano Farina (FIGC)

15 March 2006 Second Leg	Strasbourg (France)	2 – 2	(Switzerland) Basel	Stade de la Meinau, Strasbourg
18:00	Carlier 11' (1:1); Kanté 78' (2:2)	UEFA summary FCB summary	3' (0:1) Eduardo; 26' (1:2) Eduardo	Referee: (Portugal) Olegário Benquerença (FPF)
Note: No yellow cards

Basel won 4-2 on aggregate.

===== Quarter-finals =====
30 March 2006 First Leg	Basel (Switzerland)	2 – 0	(England) Middlesbrough	St. Jakob-Park, Basel
20:45	D. Degen (yellow card) 29'; Majstorović (yellow card) 40'; Delgado 43'; D. Degen 45+1'	UEFA summary FCB summary	(yellow card) 53' Downing; (yellow card) 77' Riggott	Attendance: 23,639; Referee: (Italy) Roberto Rosetti (FIGC)

6 April 2006 Second Leg	Middlesbrough (England)	4 – 1	(Switzerland) Basel	Riverside Stadium, Middlesbrough
21:00	Riggott (yellow card) 24'; Viduka 33' (1:1); Parnaby (yellow card) 44'; Viduka 57' (2:1); Hasselbaink 79' (3:1); Maccarone 90' (4:1); Maccarone (yellow card) 90+1'	UEFA summary FCB summary	23' (0:1) Eduardo; (yellow card) 55' (yellow-red card) 74' Majstorović; (yellow card) 58' D. Degen; (yellow card) 90+3' Zuberbühler	Attendance: 24,521; Referee: (Russia) Yuri Baskakov (RFS)

Middlesbrough won 4-3 on aggregate.

=== Thun ===
==== Champions League ====
===== Second qualifying round =====
26 July 2005 First leg	Dynamo Kyiv (Ukraine)	2–2	(Switzerland) Thun	Lobanovsky Dynamo Stadium, Kyiv
	Husyev 20'; Shatskikh 40'		Lustrinelli 28'; Aegerter 66'

3 August 2005 Second leg	Thun (Switzerland)	1–0	(Ukraine) Dynamo Kyiv	Wankdorf Stadium, Bern
	Bernardini 90+'

===== Third qualifying round =====
10 August 2005 First leg	Malmö FF (Sweden)	0–1	(Switzerland) Thun	Malmö Stadion, Malmö
			Pimenta 34'

23 August 2005 Second leg	Thun (Switzerland)	3–0	(Sweden) Malmö FF	Stade de Suisse Wankdorf, Bern
	Bernardini 26'; Lustrinelli 40', 66'

===== Group stage / Group B =====
14 September 2005 Matchday 1	Arsenal (England)	2–1	(Switzerland) Thun	Highbury, London
20:45	Gilberto 51'; Bergkamp 90+2'	Report	Ferreira 53'	Attendance: 34,500; Referee: Grzegorz Gilewski (Poland)

27 September 2005 Matchday 2	Thun (Switzerland)	1–0	(Czech Republic) Sparta Prague	Stade de Suisse, Bern
20:45	Hodžić 89'	Report		Attendance: 30,800; Referee: Bertrand Layec (France)

18 October 2005 Matchday 3	Ajax (Netherlands)	2–0	(Switzerland) Thun	Amsterdam Arena, Amsterdam
20:45	Anastasiou 36', 55'	Report		Attendance: 44,775; Referee: Roberto Rosetti (Italy)

2 November 2005 Matchday 4	Thun (Switzerland)	2–4	(Netherlands) Ajax	Stade de Suisse, Bern
20:45	Lustrinelli 56'; Adriano 74'	Report	Sneijder 27'; Anastasiou 63' de Jong 90+1'; Boukhari 90+3'	Attendance: 30,120; Referee: Vladimír Hriňák (Slovakia)

22 November 2005 Matchday 5	Thun (Switzerland)	0–1	(England) Arsenal	Stade de Suisse, Bern
20:45		Report	Pires 88' (pen.)	Attendance: 31,330; Referee: Lucílio Batista (Portugal)

7 December 2005 Matchday 6	Sparta Prague (Czech Republic)	0–0	(Switzerland) Thun	Sparta Stadium, Prague
20:45		Report		Attendance: 15,000; Referee: Mike Riley (England)

Pos	Team	Pld	W	D	L	GF	GA	GD	Pts	Qualification	ARS	AJA	THU	SPR
1	(England) Arsenal	6	5	1	0	10	2	+8	16	Advance to knockout stage	—	0–0	2–1	3–0
2	(Netherlands) Ajax	6	3	2	1	10	6	+4	11	Advance to knockout stage	1–2	—	2–0	2–1
3	(Switzerland) Thun	6	1	1	4	4	9	−5	4	Transfer to UEFA Cup	0–1	2–4	—	1–0
4	(Czech Republic) Sparta Prague	6	0	2	4	2	9	−7	2		0–2	1–1	0–0	—

Source: RSSSF

==== UEFA Cup ====
===== Round of 32 =====
15 February 2006 First leg	Thun (Switzerland)	1–0	(Germany) Hamburg	Stade de Suisse, Wankdorf, Bern
18:30	Adriano 30'	Report		Referee: Martin Hansson (Sweden)

23 February 2006 Second leg	Hamburg (Germany)	2–0	(Switzerland) Thun	Volksparkstadion, Hamburg
18:30	Van Buyten 2', 33'	Report		Referee: Alon Yefet (Israel)

=== Grasshoppers ===
==== UEFA Cup ====
===== Second qualifying round =====
11 August 2005 First leg	Grasshoppers (Switzerland)	1–0	(Poland) Wisła Płock	Hardturm, Zürich
19:30	Eduardo 68'	Report		Referee: Duarte Gomes (Portugal)

25 August 2005 Second leg	Wisła Płock (Poland)	3–2	(Switzerland) Grasshoppers	Kazimierz Górski Stadium, Płock
18:00	Gęsior 35', 38'; Zilić 69'	Report	António 30'; Eduardo 83'	Referee: Egill Mar Markusson (Iceland)

3–3 on aggregate, Grasshoppers win on away goals

===== First round =====
15 September 2005 First leg	Grasshoppers (Switzerland)	1–1	(Finland) MyPa	Hardturm, Zürich
19:30	Salatić 1'	Report	Marco Manso 19'	Referee: Dougie McDonald (Scotland)

29 September 2005 Second leg	MyPa (Finland)	0–3	(Switzerland) Grasshoppers	Pohjola Stadion, Vantaa
18:30		Report	Touré 75'; Salatić 80'; Rogério 86'	Referee: Vitaliy Godulyan (Ukraine)

Grasshoppers won 4-1 on aggregate.

===== Group stage / Group D =====
20 October 2005 Matchday 1	Grasshoppers (Switzerland)	0–1	(England) Middlesbrough	Hardturm, Zürich
21:00		Report	Hasselbaink 10'	Attendance: 8,500; Referee: Espen Berntsen (Norway)

3 November 2005 Matchday 2	Litex Lovech (Bulgaria)	2–1	(Switzerland) Grasshoppers	Lovech Stadium, Lovech
16:00	Novaković 13'; Sandrinho 81'	Report	António 90'	Attendance: 4,000; Referee: Georgios Kasnaferis (Greece)

30 November 2005 Matchday 4	Grasshoppers (Switzerland)	2–3	(Ukraine) Dnipro Dnipropetrovsk	Hardturm, Zürich
20:45	Touré 85'; Renggli 90'	Report	Nazarenko 39'; Kravchenko 61'; Mykhaylenko 84'	Attendance: 1,800; Referee: Edo Trivković (Croatia)

15 December 2005 Matchday 5	AZ (Netherlands)	1–0	(Switzerland) Grasshoppers	Alkmaarderhout, Alkmaar
20:45	Koevermans 70'	Report		Attendance: 8,153; Referee: Hervé Piccirillo (France)

Pos	Team	Pld	W	D	L	GF	GA	GD	Pts	Qualification	MID	AZ	LIT	DNI	GRA
1	(England) Middlesbrough	4	3	1	0	6	0	+6	10	Advance to knockout stage	—	—	2–0	3–0	—
2	(Netherlands) AZ	4	3	1	0	5	1	+4	10	Advance to knockout stage	0–0	—	—	—	1–0
3	(Bulgaria) Litex Lovech	4	2	0	2	4	5	−1	6	Advance to knockout stage	—	0–2	—	—	2–1
4	(Ukraine) Dnipro Dnipropetrovsk	4	1	0	3	4	9	−5	3		—	1–2	0–2	—	—
5	(Switzerland) Grasshoppers	4	0	0	4	3	7	−4	0		0–1	—	—	2–3	—

=== Zürich ===
==== UEFA Cup ====
===== Second qualifying round =====
11 August 2005 First leg	Legia Warsaw (Poland)	0–1	(Switzerland) Zürich	Polish Army Stadium, Warsaw
18:00		Report	Raffael 90+1'	Attendance: 6,000; Referee: Pasquale Rodomonti (Italy)

25 August 2005 Second leg	Zürich (Switzerland)	4–1	(Poland) Legia Warsaw	Letzigrund, Zürich
20:00	Keita 25', 64'; Džemaili 29'; Cesar 78' (pen.)	Report	Szałachowski 18'	Attendance: 9,600; Referee: Howard Webb (England)

Zürich win 5–1 on aggregate

===== Third qualifying round =====
15 September 2005 First leg	Brøndby (Denmark)	2–0	(Switzerland) Zürich	Brøndby Stadium, Brøndby
20:15	Skoubo 46'; Johansen 72'	Report		Attendance: 13,614; Referee: Romans Lajuks (Latvia)

29 September 2005 Second leg	Zürich (Switzerland)	2–1	(Denmark) Brøndby	Letzigrund, Zürich
20:15	Raffael 15', 80'	Report	Elmander 42'	Attendance: 8,600; Referee: Claude Colombo (France)

Brøndby won 3–2 on aggregate.

=== Young Boys ===
==== Intertoto Cup ====
===== Second qualifying round =====
2 July 2005 First leg	Lokeren (Belgium)	1–4	(Switzerland) Young Boys	Het Kuipje, Westerlo
	Deschacht 70'		Steinsson 4'; Neri 25'; Varela 49'; Häberli 67'	Attendance: 545; Referee: Brage Sandmoen (Norway)

10 July 2005 Second leg	Young Boys (Switzerland)	2–1 (6–2 agg.)	(Belgium) Lokeren	Stadion Neufeld, Bern
	Steinsson 79'; Sermeter 81' (pen.)		Grétarsson 62' (pen.)	Attendance: 3,800; Referee: Ian Stokes (Republic of Ireland)

Young Boys won 6–2 on aggregate.

===== Third qualifying round =====
16 July 2005 First leg	Young Boys (Switzerland)	2–3	(France) Marseille	Stade de Suisse, Bern
	Raimondi 61'; Yakin 74'		Oruma 15'; Niang 35'; Taiwo 82'	Attendance: 14,000; Referee: Craig Thomson (Scotland)

23 July 2005 Second leg	Marseille (France)	2–1 (5–3 agg.)	(Switzerland) Young Boys	Stade Vélodrome, Marseille
	Luyindula 70' (pen.); Nasri 83'		Raimondi 43'	Attendance: 18,708; Referee: Ivan Bebek (Croatia)

Marseille won 5–3 on aggregate.

=== Xamax ===
==== Intertoto Cup ====
===== First qualifying round =====
18 June 2005 First leg	Lernagorts-Ararat (Armenia)	1–3	(Switzerland) Neuchâtel Xamax	Vazgen Sargsyan Republican Stadium, Yerevan
	Navoyan 27'		Griffiths 2', 32'; Muñoz 90'	Attendance: 1,300; Referee: Ioannis Tsaheilidis (Greece)

25 June 2005 Second leg	Neuchâtel Xamax (Switzerland)	6–0 (9–1 agg.)	(Armenia) Lernagorts-Ararat	Stade de Genève, Geneva
	Baumann 14'; Oppliger 17'; Maraninchi 36'; Doudin 39'; Griffiths 64'; Cordonnier 86'			Attendance: 800; Referee: Hristo Ristoskov (Bulgaria)

Neuchâtel Xamax won 9–1 on aggregate.

===== Second qualifying round =====
2 July 2005 First leg	Saint-Étienne (France)	1–1	(Switzerland) Neuchâtel Xamax	Stade Geoffroy-Guichard, Saint-Étienne
	Sablé 71'		Lombardo 57'	Attendance: 32,021; Referee: Richard Havrilla (Slovakia)

10 July 2005 Second leg	Neuchâtel Xamax (Switzerland)	1–2 (2–3 agg.)	(France) Saint-Étienne	Stade de Genève, Geneva
	Maraninchi 80'		Mazure 60'; Feindouno 70'	Attendance: 11,273; Referee: Marian Mircea Salomir (Romania)

Saint-Étienne won 3–2 on aggregate.

=== Vaduz ===
==== UEFA Cup ====
===== First qualifying round =====
14 July 2005 First leg	Vaduz (Liechtenstein)	2–0	(Moldova) Dacia Chişinău	Rheinpark Stadion, Vaduz
19:30	Gohouri 53'; Gaspar 71'	Report		Attendance: 850; Referee: Lassin Isaksen (Faroe Islands)

28 July 2005 Second leg	Dacia Chişinău (Moldova)	1–0 (1–2 agg.)	(Liechtenstein) Vaduz	Stadionul Republican, Chişinău
17:30	Japalau 63'	Report		Attendance: 4,000; Referee: Emil Laursen (Denmark)

Vaduz won 2–1 on aggregate

===== Second qualifying round =====
11 August 2005 First leg	Vaduz (Liechtenstein)	0–1	(Turkey) Beşiktaş	Rheinpark Stadion, Vaduz
19:30		Report	Buruk 12'	Attendance: 2,650; Referee: Ivan Bebek (Croatia)

25 August 2005 Second leg	Beşiktaş (Turkey)	5–1 (6–1 agg.)	(Liechtenstein) Vaduz	BJK İnönü Stadium, Istanbul
20:00	Aílton 35'; Hassan 61'; Dursun 83' (pen.); Dursun 89'; Pancu 90+2'	Report	Gaspar 28'	Attendance: 15,120; Referee: Igor Egorov (Russia)

Beşiktaş win 6–1 on aggregate

== Sources ==
- Switzerland Cup 2005–06 at RSSSF
- 1. Liga season 2005–06 at the official website
- Cup finals at Fussball-Schweiz
- Josef Zindel (2018). FC Basel 1893. Die ersten 125 Jahre (in German). Basel: Friedrich Reinhardt Verlag. ISBN 978-3-7245-2305-5.

Preceded by 2004–05	Seasons in Swiss football	Succeeded by 2006–07
