= Felipe Caicedo =

Ecuadorian footballer (born 1988)

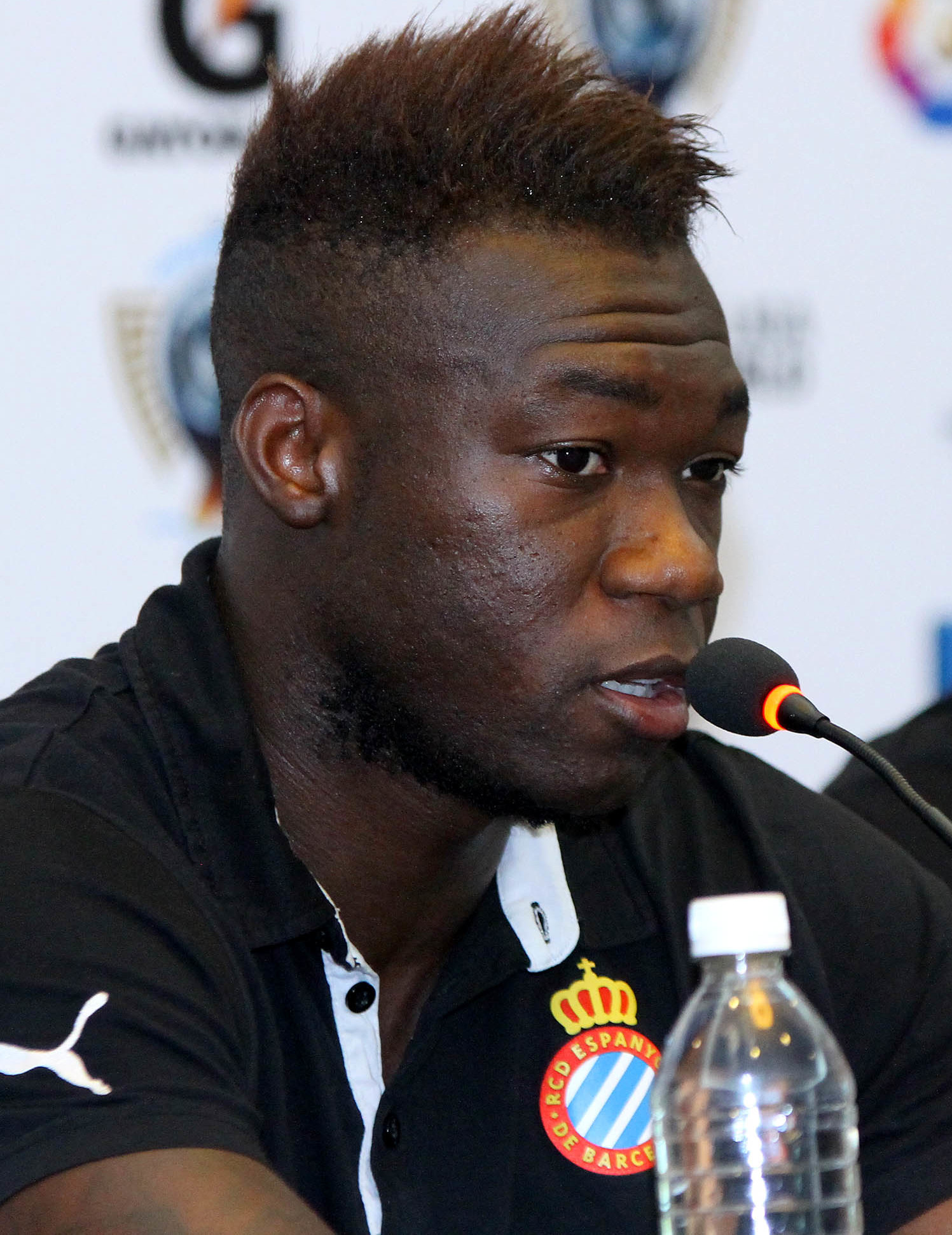
- Caicedo in a press conference with Espanyol in 2015

Personal information
- Full name: Felipe Salvador Caicedo Corozo
- Date of birth: 5 September 1988 (age 38)
- Place of birth: Guayaquil, Ecuador
- Height: 1.83 m (6 ft 0 in)
- Position: Striker

Youth career
- 2002–2004: Barcelona SC
- 2004–2005: Rocafuerte

Senior career*
| Years | Team | Apps | (Gls) |
| 2006–2008 | Basel | 45 | (11) |
| 2008–2011 | Manchester City | 27 | (4) |
| 2009 | → Sporting CP (loan) | 7 | (0) |
| 2010 | → Málaga (loan) | 18 | (4) |
| 2010–2011 | → Levante (loan) | 27 | (13) |
| 2011–2013 | Lokomotiv Moscow | 52 | (11) |
| 2014 | Al Jazira | 9 | (4) |
| 2014–2017 | Espanyol | 93 | (19) |
| 2017–2021 | Lazio | 105 | (28) |
| 2021–2022 | Genoa | 9 | (1) |
| 2022 | → Inter Milan (loan) | 3 | (0) |
| 2022–2023 | Abha | 23 | (2) |
| 2025 | Barcelona S.C. | 15 | (2) |

International career
| 2005–2017 | Ecuador | 68 | (22) |
- * Club domestic league appearances and goals as of 25 July 2025

Felipe Salvador Caicedo Corozo (born 5 September 1988) is an Ecuadorian former professional footballer who played as a striker.

A full international from 2005 to 2017, Caicedo represented Ecuador at the Copa América in 2007 and 2011, as well as at the 2014 World Cup. Caicedo is also Ecuador's sixth highest goalscorer of all-time with 22 goals to his name.

== Club career ==
=== Basel ===
Caicedo spent his youth career with Rocafuerte, a club based in Guayaquil, Ecuador. At that time, they played in the third tier of the Ecuadorian regional league.

Caicedo was signed by Swiss Super League side Basel during the 2005–06 season for an undisclosed fee while he was just 17 years old. Due to his age, he was trained in the Basel youth department playing with their U-21 team, apart from a few test matches with the senior team. Following his 18th birthday on 5 September 2006, he joined Basel's first team for their 2006–07 season under head coach Christian Gross, who started his eighth season with the club in that position. After playing in seven test games, Caicedo made his domestic league debut for the team on 10 September, at the home game in the St. Jakob-Park as Basel won 2–1 against Zürich, being substituted on in the 82nd minute. He scored his first professional goal, three weeks later on 1 October, in an away game in the Swiss Cup. Coming on in the 74th minute he scored the team's second goal just three minutes later and Basel went on to win 4–0 against Lugano. He scored his first league goal for the team in the home game on 9 November. In the 56th minute, the away team went 2–0 up, Basel coach Gross reacted and brought in Caicedo as substitute immediately. Just six minutes later Caicedo scored his team's first goal and in the 85th Cristiano netted the equaliser.

Another goal worth mentioning, came just three days later, on 12 November in the Swiss Cup away match against lower-classed Baulmes. Caicedo was substituted on at half-time as Basel were two goals down. In the 73rd minute Caicedo scored for the team, who were able to equalise another seven minutes later. During the extra time Basel achieved the third goal to the 3–2 victory to advance to the quarter-finals. In the final, played on 28 May 2007 in the Stadion Wankdorf in Bern, Basel won 1–0 against Luzern and Caicedo, therefore won his first professional title- Caicedo was included in the starting lineup. That season Caicedo had 27 league appearances, scoring seven goals and he had five cup appearances, scoring twice. The team ended the league as runners-up.

On 19 July 2007 it was announced that Caicedo had prematurely prolonged his contract with Basel, intending to keep him with the club until summer 2010. Nevertheless, it was also known that the end of the season, Everton and Juventus had shown interest in the player, with Milan even said to have failed with their offer during the summer break. Basel played in the 2007–08 UEFA Cup. Winning both matches in the qualification round against SV Mattersburg and both matches in the play-off round against Sarajevo, they team advanced to the group stage, which they ended undefeated in second position, after playing 1–0 at home against Stade Rennes, 0–0 away against Dinamo Zagreb, 1–0 at home against Brann and 1–1 away against Hamburger SV, to continue the knockout stage. Caicedo had played in all eight of these matches and he had scored three goals. He had also played in all 18 matches in the first half of the 2007–08 Swiss Super League season, netting four times. He also played in three of the four matches in the 2007–08 Swiss Cup, but without scoring.

During his time with the club. Caicedo played a total of 79 games for Basel scoring a total of 23 goals. 45 of these games were in the Swiss Super League, eight in the Swiss Cup, eight in the UEFA Cup and 18 were friendly games. He scored 11 goals in the domestic league, two in the cup, three in the European games and the other seven were scored during the test games.

=== Manchester City ===
On 31 January 2008, it was announced that Manchester City had secured Caicedo's services on a four-and-a-half-year deal through a £5.2 million transfer fee (€7 million), which would make his sale one of the highest transfers in the history of the Swiss Super League. His transfer to Manchester City was completed after Caicedo was granted a work permit. Caicedo was described by his manager as "one of the great South American talents" and was also compared to the Brazilian Adriano. He made his debut on 10 February 2008, in a 2–1 away win against rivals Manchester United, coming on in the second half. He ended the season with 10 appearances in the Premier League, coming on as a sub in all of them.

Caicedo scored his first goal for City the following season in a UEFA Cup group stage loss against Racing de Santander. He scored his second consecutive goal with a back heel in a league game against West Bromwich Albion, but the goal was initially ruled as an own goal, as it hit the post and then the goalkeeper before finally going in. The goal was later given back to Caicedo after reconsideration from the Dubious Goals Committee. After these solid performances, both coming off the bench, club manager Mark Hughes gave him the opportunity to start his first game in the league and he went on to score for the third game in a row, this time scoring the first two goals in a 5–1 victory against Hull City on 26 December 2008, taking his goal tally up to four.

Caicedo opened the scoring in the first leg of the UEFA Cup last 16 tie with Aalborg BK at the City of Manchester Stadium, with City winning the game 2–0. Caicedo scored his sixth goal of the season for the club in the UEFA Cup quarter-finals against Hamburger SV on 16 April 2009. Although City won the match 2–1, they were eliminated from the cup 4–3 on aggregate. Caicedo impressed many Manchester City fans that season with his strong performances as a single striker with the ability to hold up the ball in key areas and shrug off defenders. Caicedo's seventh City goal came in City's 3–1 home win over Blackburn Rovers on 2 May, and he netted his eighth goal in the 1–0 home win over Bolton Wanderers on the last day of the season.

==== Loan to Sporting ====
At the start of the 2009–10 season, Caicedo was tipped to leave City in order to get more playing time, especially after the club signed fellow forwards Roque Santa Cruz, Emmanuel Adebayor, and Carlos Tevez. On 23 July 2009, Sporting Clube de Portugal and Manchester City reached an agreement over an initial one-year loan with an option of a permanent deal, which would allow him to be part of their squad for the 2009–10 Champions League, potentially allowing Caicedo a year to develop himself as a forward before returning to Manchester City.

Caicedo made his debut for Sporting after coming on as a substitute for an injured Hélder Postiga in the 38th minute of a 2–1 loss against Braga on 22 August 2009. After suffering a ligament injury in a match against Braga which ruled him out of action for 3 weeks, Caicedo made his return for Sporting against Olhanense on 21 September 2009, and provided an assist for Simon Vukčević's winning goal in a 3–2 victory. Caicedo, however, found it difficult to adapt at Sporting and his loan deal was cut short in January 2010. In total, the Ecuadorian played 11 games for the Portuguese club but failed to score in any.

==== Loan to Málaga ====
After Sporting decided to end Caicedo's loan spell at the club, other clubs showed interest in the Manchester City striker, Málaga CF and Hull City amongst them. On 8 January 2010, Caicedo decided to join Málaga on loan, rejecting an offer from Hull City.

He scored his first La Liga goal for Málaga with a beautiful individual effort against Racing de Santander, helping Málaga win 3–0 on 14 February 2010. On 10 April 2010, Caicedo scored his first goal in two months in a 2–1 loss against Sevilla and 4 days later on 14 April 2010, Caicedo scored again in a 2–2 draw against Osasuna. On the final matchday of the domestic season, Málaga required a point to stay above the relegation zone, where they faced Real Madrid at home at La Rosaleda. Caicedo started and provided a wonderful assist for Duda to open the scoring in the ninth minute. Real Madrid levelled after the break through Rafael van der Vaart, but the early goal was enough for Málaga to avoid relegation.

==== Loan to Levante ====
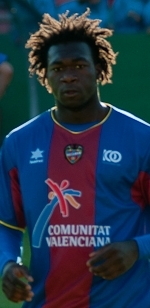
Caicedo playing for Levante in 2011

Just one hour before the deadline of the Spanish summer transfer window, Caicedo completed a loan move to freshly promoted Levante for the 2010–11 season. This revitalized his career, where by December 2010, he had contributed seven goals in 12 appearances; included in these seven goals was a brace scored against Racing de Santander on 21 November 2010. Along with a Christian Stuani strike, Levante went on to win 3–1, picking themselves out of the relegation zone after a miserable four-match losing streak.

Caicedo scored his team's only goal in a 2–1 defeat to Athletic Bilbao on 18 December 2010. This was the last game before the winter break and started an abysmal five-game losing streak for Levante that left them at the bottom of the Liga table. Levante turned this around on 29 January 2011 against Getafe, with Caicedo scoring the second goal of a 2–0 win and lifting the team from the bottom of the relegation zone.

On 11 May, Caicedo scored his 13th league goal against Barcelona at the Estadi Ciutat de València. Caicedo finished the ball in fine fashion, after capitalizing on defender Gerard Piqué's error. The game ended in a 1–1 draw, which handed Barcelona their third-straight La Liga title, but this crucial point for Levante put them five points above the relegation zone with two games remaining. Caicedo's thirteen league goals helped to secure Levante's place in La Liga for a second season.

On 30 May 2011, Levante officially took up an option to sign him for €1 million on a three-year contract. However, it was revealed that Levante would cash in by selling Caicedo for a large profit in the summer because the club were in debt, owing €12 million ($17 million) a year in repayments.

Following his time in Spain, reports showed that he travelled to Moscow because of interest from Russian Premier League clubs Lokomotiv Moscow and Anzhi Makhachkala.

=== Lokomotiv Moscow ===
On 25 July 2011, Caicedo signed a four-year contract with Lokomotiv Moscow for a fee of €7.5 million and was handed the number 25 jersey. Previously, Lokomotiv Moscow tried to sign Caicedo in the winter transfer window before it closed on 10 March 2011 after Lokomotiv Moscow failed to sign Stuttgart striker Ciprian Marica. Following his move to Lokomotiv, club president Olga Smorodskaya accused Levante of behaving unprofessionally in the sale and hit out at Levante for their lack of co-operation during negotiations, saying to RIA Novosti that the deal was "very difficult" because, "Levante's directors seemed to have very poor knowledge of FIFA regulations."

On 14 August 2011, Caicedo made his debut in the Russian Premier League after coming on at the 61st minute for Dmitri Loskov as Lokomotiv Moscow drew 0–0 against Volga. On 28 August 2011, Caicedo scored his first goal for the club, the winning goal against Kuban Krasnodar. After scoring for Lokomotiv Moscow, Caicedo began scoring and providing assists on a weekly basis for 4 weeks including 3 goals. The first of these goals came against in a 4–2 win against Zenit on 10 September 2011, another against Terek Grozny in a 4–0 win, and the third and final of the run against Anzhi, a goal which again proved to be the winning goal. He had provided his one assist of the run a week before, assisting Alberto Zapater who scored his first goal for Lokomitiv in the 1–1 draw against Rubin Kazin on 25 September 2011. In the first half of the Russian Premier League, Caicedo made 13 league appearances, scoring 6 goals.

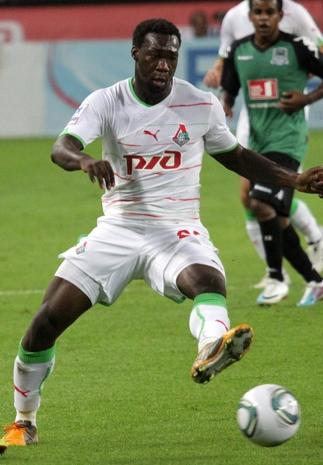
Caicedo playing for Lokomotiv Moscow in 2011

In the Europa League, Caicedo made his debut in the Play-off round as Lokomotiv Moscow beat Spartak Trnava 3–1 on aggregate on 25 August 2011. On 20 October 2011, Caicedo scored his first Europa League goal in a 3–1 group stage win over AEK Athens. On 16 February 2012, in the Europa League Round of 32, Caicedo scored a winning goal in the 71st minute of a 2–1 win against Athletic Bilbao; Caicedo also won the penalty that Denis Glushakov scored for his team's first goal. In the second leg of the Europa League Round of 32, Caicedo played as his club were eliminated after Athletic Bilbao won 1–0 and progressing in the competition due to the away goals rule.

In the January transfer window, reports from Brazil and Ecuador claimed that Caicedo was joining Série B side Boa Esporte on loan. However, the move was rejected by Olga Smorodskaya saying that she had no intention in loaning him and said the offer was "nonsense".

=== Al-Jazira ===
In 2014, Felipe Caicedo joined Al-Jazira. Upon the arrival of Mirko Vučinić to the club, Al-Jazira and Caicedo parted ways by mutual consent, making him a Free agent after 18 appearances and 5 goals.

=== Espanyol ===
On 15 July 2014, Caicedo signed for La Liga club Espanyol on a Bosman transfer. On 20 September 2014, he scored his first goal for the club in a 2–2 draw against Malaga. On 29 November, he scored in a 2–1 victory over his former club, Levante. Two weeks later, he scored the opening goal in a 2–1 victory over Granada at RCDE Stadium. On 13 January 2015, Caicedo scored a brace in 12 minutes in a 2-0 Copa del Rey victory over Valencia, helping his club qualify for the quarter-finals. Four days later, he scored a last minute winner in a 1–0 home victory over Celta de Vigo. In the first leg of the CDR quarter-final against Sevilla on 22 January, Caicedo scored the opening goal of a 3–1 victory; although Espanyol lost the second leg 1–0, Caicedo's goal was enough to put Espanyol in the semi-finals for the first time since winning the competition in 2006. Caicedo played both legs of the CDR semi-finals, as Espanyol were knocked out by Athletic Bilbao 3–1 on aggregate on 4 March. On 9 April, he scored a brace in a 3–0 away victory against Villarreal. Caicedo ended his first season with the club scoring 12 goals in 40 appearances.

Caicedo's first goal of the 2015-16 season came in a 3–1 defeat to Villarreal on 28 August 2015. On 1 November 2015, Caidedo scored a last minute equalizer in a 1–1 draw against Granada. On 15 December, Caicedo scored a game winner in the Copa del Rey victory against Levante to help Espanyol qualify for the round of 16, where they were faced with city rivals Barcelona. Caicedo scored the opening goal in the first leg against Barcelona, but the match ended in a 4–1 loss, and a 6–1 loss on aggregate as Barca went on to lift the cup trophy. On 19 December, he scored the game's only goal in a 1–0 victory to help his club grab three points. Caicedo scored two more game winners that season: in a 2–1 victory over Athletic Bilbao on 20 March 2016, and in an important 1–0 victory over Sevilla on the 36th matchday on 1 May 2016. For the 2015-16 season Caicedo's totals were 10 goals in 34 appearances.

Caicedo had a slow 2016–17 season, scoring twice in 29 appearances, and with Gerard Moreno and Léo Baptistão above him in the pecking order, he began to look for a new club.

=== Lazio ===
On 2 August 2017, Caicedo was signed by Lazio for €2.5million. He was given the number 20 by his new club. On 20 August, Caicedo made his league debut vs SPAL, coming on as a substitute for Senad Lulić in the 85th minute. On 3 December, he came off the bench to score his first Serie A goal in injury-time of Lazio's 1–2 away win over Sampdoria. Notably he continued scoring a series of extra time goals, six in total, which made him the player with most goals after the 90-minute mark in the history of Serie A. Along with the one to Sampdoria these goals include games against Cagliari (1–2), Sassuolo (1–2), Juventus (3–1), Torino (3–4) and Juventus (1-1), with the exception of the 1–1 with Juventus, all games that led to a Lazio victory. While playing for Lazio he won two Italian Supercup titles (2017, 2019) and one Coppa Italia (2018–2019).

=== Genoa ===
On 31 August 2021, Caicedo joined Genoa.

==== Loan to Inter ====
On 29 January 2022, Caicedo joined Inter Milan on loan until the end of the 2021–22 season.

=== Abha ===
On 28 August 2022, Caicedo joined Saudi Arabian club Abha on a free transfer.

== International career ==
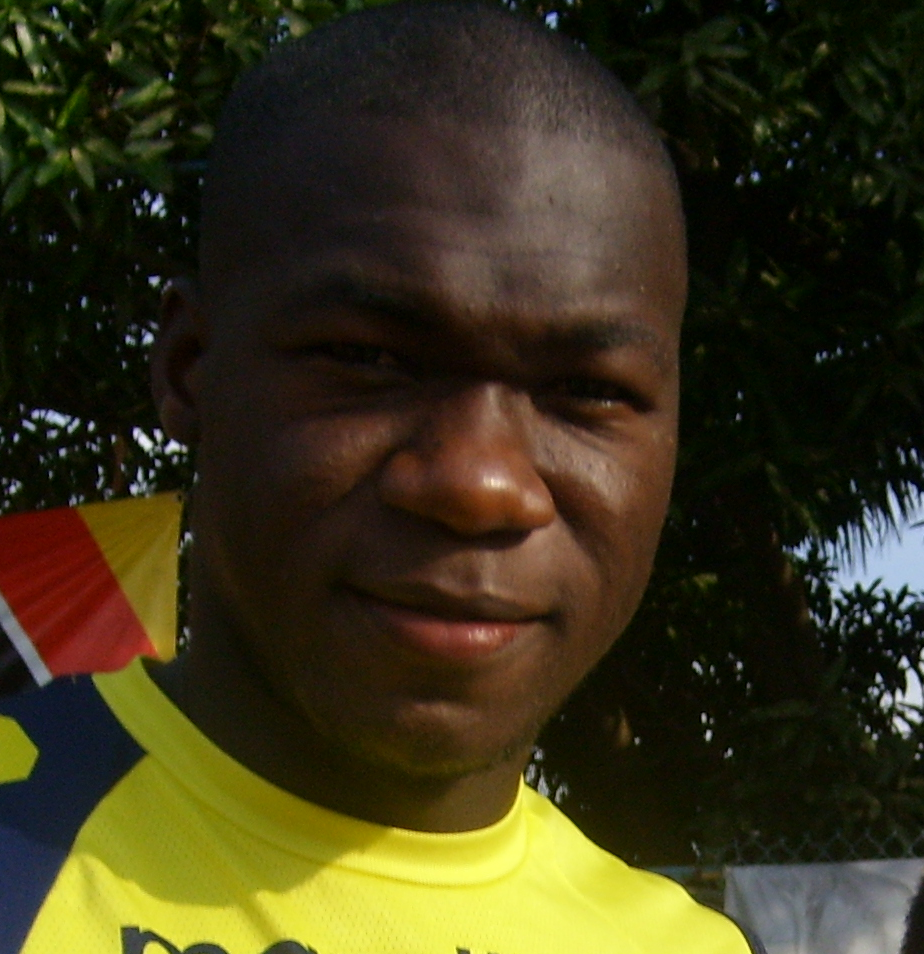
Caicedo with the Ecuador national team in 2007

On 10 February 2009, Caicedo scored the winning goal in a 3–2 victory against England's U-21 team.

In Ecuador's final group game of the 2011 Copa America, Caicedo scored twice, although Ecuador lost 4–2 and were knocked out.

On 21 March 2013, following the words of Agustín Castillo, the coach of El Salvador, that the current Ecuador team is the "best Ecuador of the history", Caicedo scored twice against El Salvador.

In May 2016, Caicedo suffered an injury in a match against Barcelona, which kept him sidelined for around a month and caused him to miss the Copa América Centenario.

In September 2017, Caicedo announced his retirement from the national team after manager Gustavo Quinteros was sacked.

== Career statistics ==
=== Club ===
As of match played 22 May 2022

Appearances and goals by club, season and competition
| Club | Season | League | | | National cup | | League cup | | Continental | | Other | | Total | |
| Club | Season | Division | Apps | Goals | Apps | Goals | Apps | Goals | Apps | Goals | Apps | Goals | Apps | Goals |
|---|---|---|---|---|---|---|---|---|---|---|---|---|---|---|
| Basel U21 | 2006–07 | 1.Liga | 1 | 0 | — | | — | | — | | — | | 1 | 0 |
| Basel | 2006–07 | Swiss Super League | 27 | 7 | 5 | 2 | — | | — | | — | | 32 | 9 |
| Basel | 2007–08 | Swiss Super League | 18 | 4 | 3 | 0 | — | | 8 | 3 | — | | 29 | 7 |
| Basel | Total | | 45 | 11 | 8 | 2 | — | | 8 | 3 | — | | 61 | 16 |
| Manchester City | 2007–08 | Premier League | 10 | 0 | 0 | 0 | 0 | 0 | 0 | 0 | — | | 10 | 0 |
| Manchester City | 2008–09 | Premier League | 17 | 4 | 1 | 0 | 1 | 0 | 6 | 3 | — | | 25 | 7 |
| Manchester City | Total | | 27 | 4 | 1 | 0 | 1 | 0 | 6 | 3 | — | | 35 | 7 |
| Sporting CP (loan) | 2009–10 | Primeira Liga | 7 | 0 | 0 | 0 | 0 | 0 | 4 | 0 | — | | 11 | 0 |
| Málaga (loan) | 2009–10 | La Liga | 18 | 4 | 0 | 0 | — | | — | | — | | 18 | 4 |
| Levante (loan) | 2010–11 | La Liga | 27 | 13 | 2 | 1 | — | | — | | — | | 29 | 14 |
| Lokomotiv Moscow | 2011–12 | Russian Premier League | 17 | 6 | 1 | 0 | — | | 7 | 2 | — | | 25 | 8 |
| Lokomotiv Moscow | 2012–13 | Russian Premier League | 22 | 4 | 2 | 2 | — | | — | | — | | 24 | 6 |
| Lokomotiv Moscow | 2013–14 | Russian Premier League | 13 | 1 | 1 | 0 | — | | — | | — | | 14 | 1 |
| Lokomotiv Moscow | Total | | 52 | 11 | 4 | 2 | — | | 7 | 2 | — | | 63 | 15 |
| Al Jazira | 2013–14 | UAE Pro League | 9 | 4 | 2 | 0 | — | | 7 | 1 | — | | 18 | 5 |
| Espanyol | 2014–15 | La Liga | 35 | 9 | 5 | 3 | — | | — | | — | | 40 | 12 |
| Espanyol | 2015–16 | La Liga | 31 | 8 | 3 | 2 | — | | — | | — | | 34 | 10 |
| Espanyol | 2016–17 | La Liga | 27 | 2 | 2 | 0 | — | | — | | — | | 29 | 2 |
| Espanyol | Total | | 93 | 19 | 10 | 5 | — | | — | | — | | 103 | 24 |
| Lazio | 2017–18 | Serie A | 22 | 3 | 2 | 0 | — | | 9 | 3 | 0 | 0 | 33 | 6 |
| Lazio | 2018–19 | Serie A | 28 | 8 | 5 | 0 | — | | 5 | 1 | — | | 38 | 9 |
| Lazio | 2019–20 | Serie A | 30 | 9 | 1 | 0 | — | | 6 | 0 | 1 (Note: Appearance in Supercoppa Italiana) | 0 | 38 | 9 |
| Lazio | 2020–21 | Serie A | 25 | 8 | 0 | 0 | — | | 5 | 1 | — | | 30 | 9 |
| Lazio | Total | | 105 | 28 | 8 | 0 | — | | 25 | 5 | 1 | 0 | 139 | 33 |
| Genoa | 2021–22 | Serie A | 9 | 1 | 1 | 0 | — | | — | | — | | 10 | 1 |
| Inter Milan (loan) | 2021–22 | Serie A | 3 | 0 | 0 | 0 | — | | 0 | 0 | — | | 3 | 0 |
| Abha Club | 2022–23 | Saudi Pro League | 23 | 2 | 1 | 1 | — | | — | | — | | 24 | 3 |
| Career total | | | 418 | 97 | 37 | 11 | 1 | 0 | 57 | 14 | 1 | 0 | 511 | 122 |

=== International ===
Appearances and goals by national team and year
| National team | Year | Apps | Goals |
|---|---|---|---|
| Ecuador | 2005 | 1 | 0 |
| Ecuador | 2006 | 2 | 0 |
| Ecuador | 2007 | 13 | 2 |
| Ecuador | 2008 | 8 | 1 |
| Ecuador | 2009 | 4 | 0 |
| Ecuador | 2011 | 4 | 2 |
| Ecuador | 2012 | 3 | 4 |
| Ecuador | 2013 | 11 | 6 |
| Ecuador | 2014 | 7 | 0 |
| Ecuador | 2015 | 6 | 4 |
| Ecuador | 2016 | 5 | 2 |
| Ecuador | 2017 | 4 | 1 |
| Total | | 68 | 22 |

Scores and results list Ecuador's goal tally first, score column indicates score after each Caicedo goal.

List of international goals scored by Felipe Caicedo
| No. | Date | Venue | Opponent | Score | Result | Competition |
|---|---|---|---|---|---|---|
| 1 | 25 March 2007 | Raymond James Stadium, Tampa, United States | United States | 1–1 | 1–3 | Friendly |
| 2 | 8 September 2007 | Estadio Olímpico Atahualpa, Quito, Ecuador | El Salvador | 2–0 | 5–1 | Friendly |
| 3 | 6 September 2008 | Estadio Olímpico Atahualpa, Quito, Ecuador | Bolivia | 1–0 | 3–1 | 2010 FIFA World Cup qualification |
| 4 | 13 July 2011 | Estadio Mario Alberto Kempes, Córdoba, Argentina | Brazil | 1–1 | 2–4 | 2011 Copa América |
| 5 | 13 July 2011 | Estadio Mario Alberto Kempes, Córdoba, Argentina | Brazil | 2–2 | 2–4 | 2011 Copa América |
| 6 | 7 September 2012 | Estadio Olímpico Atahualpa, Quito, Ecuador | Bolivia | 1–0 | 1–0 | 2014 FIFA World Cup qualification |
| 7 | 11 September 2012 | Estadio Centenario, Montevideo, Uruguay | Uruguay | 1–0 | 1–1 | 2014 FIFA World Cup qualification |
| 8 | 12 October 2012 | Estadio Olímpico Atahualpa, Quito, Ecuador | Chile | 1–1 | 3–1 | 2014 FIFA World Cup qualification |
| 9 | 12 October 2012 | Estadio Olímpico Atahualpa, Quito, Ecuador | Chile | 2–1 | 3–1 | 2014 FIFA World Cup qualification |
| 10 | 6 February 2013 | Estádio D. Afonso Henriques, Guimarães, Portugal | Portugal | 3–2 | 3–2 | Friendly |
| 11 | 21 March 2013 | Estadio Olímpico Atahualpa, Quito, Ecuador | El Salvador | 1–0 | 5–0 | Friendly |
| 12 | 21 March 2013 | Estadio Olímpico Atahualpa, Quito, Ecuador | El Salvador | 3–0 | 5–0 | Friendly |
| 13 | 26 March 2013 | Estadio Olímpico Atahualpa, Quito, Ecuador | Paraguay | 2–1 | 4–1 | 2014 FIFA World Cup qualification |
| 14 | 10 September 2013 | Estadio Hernando Siles, La Paz, Bolivia | Bolivia | 1–1 | 1–1 | 2014 FIFA World Cup qualification |
| 15 | 15 October 2013 | Estadio Nacional, Santiago, Chile | Chile | 1–2 | 1–2 | 2014 FIFA World Cup qualification |
| 16 | 8 October 2015 | Estadio Monumental, Buenos Aires, Argentina | Argentina | 2–0 | 2–0 | 2018 FIFA World Cup qualification |
| 17 | 13 October 2015 | Estadio Olímpico Atahualpa, Quito, Ecuador | Bolivia | 2–0 | 2–0 | 2018 FIFA World Cup qualification |
| 18 | 12 November 2015 | Estadio Olímpico Atahualpa, Quito, Ecuador | Uruguay | 1–0 | 2–1 | 2018 FIFA World Cup qualification |
| 19 | 17 November 2015 | Polideportivo Cachamay, Ciudad Guayana, Venezuela | Venezuela | 3–0 | 3–1 | 2018 FIFA World Cup qualification |
| 20 | 6 October 2016 | Estadio Olímpico Atahualpa, Quito, Ecuador | Chile | 3–0 | 3–0 | 2018 FIFA World Cup qualification |
| 21 | 10 November 2016 | Estadio Centenario, Montevideo, Uruguay | Uruguay | 1–1 | 1–2 | 2018 FIFA World Cup qualification |
| 22 | 23 March 2017 | Estadio Defensores del Chaco, Asunción, Paraguay | Paraguay | 1–2 | 1–2 | 2018 FIFA World Cup qualification |

== Honours ==
Basel

- Swiss Championship: 2007–08
- Swiss Cup: 2006–07, 2007–08

Lazio

- Coppa Italia: 2018–19
- Supercoppa Italiana: 2017, 2019

Inter Milan

- Coppa Italia: 2021–22

== Sources ==
- Josef Zindel (2018). FC Basel 1893. Die ersten 125 Jahre (in German). Basel: Friedrich Reinhardt Verlag. ISBN 978-3-7245-2305-5.
