= 2015–16 RCD Espanyol season =

The 2015–16 RCD Espanyol season was the club's 114th season in its history and its 81st in La Liga, the top-flight of Spanish football.

== Squad ==
As of 28 January 2016

Note: Flags indicate national team as defined under FIFA eligibility rules; some limited exceptions apply. Players may hold more than one non-FIFA nationality.

No.	Pos.	Nation	Player
1	GK	LTU	Giedrius Arlauskis (on loan from Watford)
2	DF	ESP	Rober
3	DF	ESP	Rubén Duarte
4	MF	ESP	Víctor Sánchez (vice-captain)
5	MF	ESP	Víctor Álvarez (3rd captain)
6	DF	CHI	Enzo Roco
7	FW	ESP	Gerard
8	MF	ESP	Salva Sevilla
9	MF	ESP	Burgui (on loan from Real Madrid)
10	MF	ESP	Abraham
11	MF	ESP	Paco Montañés
12	MF	SEN	Pape Diop
13	GK	ESP	Pau

No.	Pos.	Nation	Player
14	MF	ESP	José Cañas
15	DF	FRA	Michaël Ciani
16	MF	ESP	Javi López (captain)
17	MF	PAR	Hernán Pérez
18	DF	ESP	Juan Fuentes
19	MF	ESP	Joan Jordán
20	FW	ECU	Felipe Caicedo
22	DF	ESP	Álvaro
23	DF	ESP	Anaitz Arbilla
24	DF	CRC	Óscar Duarte
25	MF	ESP	Marco Asensio (on loan from Real Madrid)
28	FW	SEN	Mamadou Sylla

RCD Espanyol
2015–16 season
- President: Joan Collet i Diví
- Head coach: Constantin Gâlcă
- Stadium: Cornellà-El Prat
- La Liga: 13th
- Copa del Rey: Round of 16
- Top goalscorer: League: Felipe Caicedo (8); All: Felipe Caicedo (10)
Home colours	Away colours	Third colours

=== Out on loan ===
Note: Flags indicate national team as defined under FIFA eligibility rules; some limited exceptions apply. Players may hold more than one non-FIFA nationality.

No.	Pos.	Nation	Player
—	GK	ESP	Germán Parreño (on loan at Girona)
—	DF	ESP	Antonio Raillo (on loan at Ponferradina)
—	DF	ESP	Carlos Clerc (on loan at Girona)
—	MF	ESP	Álex Fernández (on loan at Reading)

No.	Pos.	Nation	Player
—	MF	ESP	Marc Caballé (on loan at Lugo)
—	FW	ESP	Jairo Morillas (on loan at Girona)
—	FW	ESP	Lauren Egea (on loan at Cornellà)
—	FW	CGO	Thievy Bifouma (on loan at Reims)

== Competitions ==
=== Overall ===
Competition	Started round	Final position / round	First match	Last match
La Liga	–	13th	22 August 2015	15 May 2016
Copa del Rey	Round of 32	Round of 16	15 December 2015	13 January 2016

Updated to match played 30 January 2016
Source: Competitions

=== Overview ===
Competition	Record							
Competition	Pld	W	D	L	GF	GA	GD	Win %
La Liga	38	11	7	20	39	74	−35	28.95
Copa del Rey	4	1	1	2	4	7	−3	25.00
Total	42	12	8	22	43	81	−38	28.57

Last updated: 15 May 2016
Source: Competitions

=== La Liga ===
==== League table ====
Pos	Team	Pld	W	D	L	GF	GA	GD	Pts
11	Las Palmas	38	12	8	18	45	53	−8	44 (Note: Las Palmas finished ahead of Valencia on head-to-head record; Valencia 1–1 Las Palmas, Las Palmas 2–1 Valencia.)
12	Valencia	38	11	11	16	46	48	−2	44
13	Espanyol	38	12	7	19	40	74	−34	43 (Note: Espanyol finished ahead of Eibar on head-to-head goal difference; Eibar 2–1 Espanyol, Espanyol 4–2 Eibar.)
14	Eibar	38	11	10	17	49	61	−12	43
15	Deportivo La Coruña	38	8	18	12	45	61	−16	42

Source: La Liga, Soccerway
Rules for classification: 1) Points; 2) Head-to-head points; 3) Head-to-head goal difference; 4) Goal difference; 5) Goals scored; 6) Fair-play points; 7) Play-off.

==== Results summary ====
Overall								Home						Away					
Pld	W	D	L	GF	GA	GD	Pts	W	D	L	GF	GA	GD	W	D	L	GF	GA	GD
38	12	7	19	40	74	−34	43	9	5	5	22	28	−6	3	2	14	18	46	−28

Last updated: 15 May 2016.

==== Result round by round ====
Round	1	2	3	4	5	6	7	8	9	10	11	12	13	14	15	16	17	18	19	20	21	22	23	24	25	26	27	28	29	30	31	32	33	34	35	36	37	38
Ground	H	A	H	A	H	A	H	A	A	H	A	H	A	H	A	H	A	H	A	A	H	A	H	A	H	A	H	H	A	H	A	H	A	H	A	H	A	H
Result	W	L	L	W	W	L	L	W	L	D	L	W	L	D	L	W	L	D	L	L	D	L	L	L	W	W	L	W	D	W	D	L	L	D	L	W	L	W
Position	4	8	12	8	6	9	10	9	11	10	13	10	12	12	12	12	13	12	13	14	13	15	17	17	16	14	14	13	14	12	13	15	15	15	15	14	15	13

Updated to match(es) played on 9 May 2016. Source:
A = Away; H = Home; W = Win; D = Draw; L = Loss

==== Matches ====
Win Draw Loss

22 August 2015 1	Espanyol	1–0	Getafe	Barcelona
18:30 (UTC+2)	Sevilla 3'; Arbilla (yellow card) 56'; Sánchez (yellow card) 63'	Report	Vergini (yellow card) 47' (yellow-red card) 82'; Sarabia (yellow card) 48'; Pedro León (yellow card) 52'; Medrán (yellow card) 79'	Stadium: Cornellà-El Prat; Attendance: 14,575; Referee: Jesús Gil Manzano

28 August 2015 2	Villarreal	3–1	Espanyol	Villarreal
20:30 (UTC+2)	Soldado 67'; Bailly (yellow card) 85'; Bakambu 87', 90+3'	Report	Caicedo 5' (yellow card) 35'; Pau (yellow card) 19'; López (yellow card) 27'; Montañés (yellow card) 30'; Raillo (yellow card) 48'; Arbilla (yellow card) 55'	Stadium: El Madrigal; Attendance: 16,722; Referee: Carlos Velasco Carballo

12 September 2015 3	Espanyol	0–6	Real Madrid	Barcelona
16:00 (UTC+2)	González (yellow card) 16'; Cañas (yellow card) 66'	Report	Ronaldo 7', 17' (pen.), 20', 61', 81'; Benzema 28', (yellow card) 36'; Kovačić (yellow card) 69'	Stadium: Cornellà-El Prat; Attendance: 32,155; Referee: Iñaki Vicandi Garrido

19 September 2015 4	Real Sociedad	2–3	Espanyol	San Sebastián
22:00 (UTC+2)	Agirretxe 20'; Granero (yellow card) 27'; Rulli (red card) 42'; Jonathas 86'; Illarramendi (yellow card) 87'	Report	Roco (yellow card) 32', (goal) 71'; Gerard 44' (pen.), (yellow card) 68'; Álvarez (yellow card) 61'; Pérez 90'	Stadium: Anoeta; Attendance: 17,481; Referee: Pedro Pérez Montero

22 September 2015 5	Espanyol	1–0	Valencia	Barcelona
20:00 CEST (UTC+02:00)	Álvarez 18'; Álvaro (yellow card) 23'; Sánchez (yellow card) 26'; Pérez (yellow card) 41'; R. Duarte (yellow card) 53'; Cañas (yellow card) 86'	Report	Rodrigo (yellow card) 38'; Mina (yellow card) 39'; Bakkali (yellow card) 50'; Gayà (yellow card) 60'; Danilo (yellow card) 70'; Piatti (yellow card) 86'; Pérez (yellow card) 86'	Stadium: Cornellà-El Prat; Attendance: 18,231; Referee: Ignacio Iglesias Villanueva

27 September 2015 6	Deportivo La Coruña	3–0	Espanyol	A Coruña
16:00 CEST (UTC+02:00)	Álvaro 14' (pen.); Lopo (yellow card) 24'; Lucas (yellow card) 26', (goal) 27', 47'; Laure (yellow card) 64'; Bergantiños (yellow card) 76'	Report	Asensio (yellow card) 13'; Diop (yellow card) 33' (yellow-red card) 79'; Roco (yellow card) 73'; R. Duarte (yellow card) 77'	Stadium: Riazor; Attendance: 20,750; Referee: José María Sánchez Martínez

3 October 2015 7	Espanyol	1–2	Sporting de Gijón	Barcelona
20:30 CEST (UTC+02:00)	Sánchez (yellow card) 3'; Cañas (yellow card) 60'; Caicedo 62'; R. Duarte (yellow card) 30'	Report	Canella (yellow card) 6'; Halilović 10'; Bernardo (yellow card) 29'; Lora (yellow card) 90+2'; Menéndez 90+2'	Stadium: Cornellà-El Prat; Attendance: 16,519; Referee: Carlos Clos Gómez

17 October 2015 8	Real Betis	1–3	Espanyol	Seville
22:05 CEST (UTC+02:00)	Ceballos (yellow card) 54'; Portillo (yellow card) 58'; Rennella 89'	Report	Roco 4'; Pérez (yellow card) 20'; Arbilla (yellow card) 30'; Caicedo 51', (yellow card) 61'; Sánchez 55', (yellow card) 70'	Stadium: Benito Villamarín; Attendance: 30,187; Referee: Ricardo de Burgos Bengoetxea

23 October 2015 9	Rayo Vallecano	3–0	Espanyol	Madrid
20:30 CEST (UTC+02:00)	Castro (yellow card) 30'; Trashorras 36' (pen.); Ebert (yellow card) 54'; Tito (yellow card) 72' (yellow-red card) 90+2'; Guerra 76', 78'	Report	Roco (yellow card) 35'; Sánchez (yellow card) 41' (yellow-red card) 66'	Stadium: Campo de Vallecas; Attendance: 10,431; Referee: Eduardo Prieto Iglesias

1 November 2015 10	Espanyol	1–1	Granada	Barcelona
16:00 CET (UTC+01:00)	Rober (yellow card) 57' (yellow-red card) 68'; Roco (yellow card) 83'; Caicedo 90+4'	Report	Márquez (yellow card) 35'; Lombán (yellow card) 36'; Babin 58', (yellow card) 87'; Biraghi (yellow card) 62'; Rochina (yellow card) 70'; Pérez (yellow card) 84'	Stadium: Cornellà-El Prat; Attendance: 16,684; Referee: Alejandro Hernández Hernández

8 November 2015 11	Athletic Bilbao	2–1	Espanyol	Bilbao
12:00 CET (UTC+01:00)	Williams 8'; Gurpegui (yellow card) 56'; García 64'; Beñat (yellow card) 73'	Report	Sánchez (yellow card) 10'; Pérez 51'; Diop (yellow card) 56'; Caicedo (yellow card) 56'; Fuentes (yellow card) 60'; López (yellow card) 86'; Sylla (yellow card) 90+3'	Stadium: San Mamés; Attendance: 42,204; Referee: Alberto Undiano Mallenco

21 November 2015 12	Espanyol	2–0	Málaga	Barcelona
20:30 CET (UTC+01:00)	Pérez 6', 20'; Diop (yellow card) 40'; Álvaro (yellow card) 42'; Pau (yellow card) 76'; Asensio (yellow card) 79'; Sánchez (yellow card) 90+1'	Report	Amrabat (yellow card) 15'; Duda (yellow card) 35'	Stadium: Cornellà-El Prat; Attendance: 12,461; Referee: Juan Martínez Munuera

28 November 2015 13	Atlético Madrid	1–0	Espanyol	Madrid
18:15 CET (UTC+01:00)	Griezmann 3'	Report	Álvaro (yellow card) 39'; Diop (yellow card) 43'; López (yellow card) 84'; Fuentes (yellow card) 90+4'	Stadium: Vicente Calderón; Attendance: 44,893; Referee: Iñaki Vicandi Garrido

7 December 2015 14	Espanyol	1–1	Levante	Barcelona
20:30 CET (UTC+01:00)	Diop (yellow card) 42'; Roco (yellow card) 49'; Caicedo (yellow card) 60'; Gerard (yellow card) 87'	Report	Lerma 6', (yellow card) 15'; P. López (yellow card) 75'; Víctor (yellow card) 82'; Toño (yellow card) 86'; Xumetra (yellow card) 88'	Stadium: Cornellà-El Prat; Attendance: 14,875; Referee: Carlos Velasco Carballo

12 December 2015 15	Celta Vigo	1–0	Espanyol	Vigo
18:15 CET (UTC+01:00)	Hernández (yellow card) 22' (yellow-red card) 47'; Fernández (yellow card) 34'; Aspas 42'; Orellana (yellow card) 76'; Nolito (yellow card) 87'	Report	Pérez (yellow card) 15'; Sánchez (yellow card) 25'	Stadium: Balaídos; Attendance: 16,498; Referee: David Fernández Borbalán

19 December 2015 16	Espanyol	1–0	Las Palmas	Barcelona
18:15 CET (UTC+01:00)	Diop (yellow card) 19'; Gerard (yellow card) 51'; Caicedo 67'; Pérez (yellow card) 78'; Sevilla (yellow card) 90+1'	Report	Hernán (yellow card) 34'; Aythami (yellow card) 56'; Mesa (yellow card) 60'; Willian José (yellow card) 90+4'	Stadium: Cornellà-El Prat; Attendance: 17,121; Referee: Mario Melero López

30 December 2015 17	Sevilla	2–0	Espanyol	Seville
18:15 CET (UTC+01:00)	Immobile 16'; Banega 41', (yellow card) 44'; Cristóforo (yellow card) 59'; Reyes (yellow card) 75'	Report	Sevilla (yellow card) 25'; Roco (yellow card) 42'; Jordán (yellow card) 68'	Stadium: Ramón Sánchez Pizjuán; Attendance: 35,544; Referee: Ignacio Iglesias Villanueva

2 January 2016 18	Espanyol	0–0	Barcelona	Barcelona
16:00 CET (UTC+01:00)	Álvaro (yellow card) 22'; López (yellow card) 31'; Jordán (yellow card) 42'; Álvarez (yellow card) 60'; Diop (yellow card) 88'	Report	Mascherano (yellow card) 22'; Neymar (yellow card) 86'; Piqué (yellow card) 90+3'	Stadium: Cornellà-El Prat; Attendance: 28,975; Referee: José González González

10 January 2016 19	Eibar	2–1	Espanyol	Eibar
18:15 CET (UTC+01:00)	Inui 15'; Pantić (yellow card) 67'; Borja (yellow card) 68', (goal) 74'; Verdi (yellow card) 90+3'	Report	Jordán 22'; Álvarez (yellow card) 58'; López (yellow card) 73'	Stadium: Ipurua; Attendance: 4,587; Referee: Santiago Jaime Latre

17 January 2016 20	Getafe	3–1	Espanyol	Getafe
18:15 CET (UTC+01:00)	Pedro León 29'; Sarabia 37'; Cala (yellow card) 55'; Vázquez (yellow card) 61'; Gómez 90+4'	Report	Pérez 26', (yellow card) 74'; Roco (yellow card) 65'	Stadium: Coliseum Alfonso Pérez; Attendance: 6,540; Referee: Carlos Clos Gómez

23 January 2016 21	Espanyol	2–2	Villarreal	Barcelona
18:15	Caicedo 4'; Jordán (yellow card) 35'; Gerard 40', (yellow card) 56' (yellow-red card) 89'; Sevilla (yellow card) 79'; Álvarez (yellow card) 89'	Report	Trigueros 24'; Costa (yellow card) 56'; Musacchio 88'	Stadium: Cornellà-El Prat; Attendance: 16,251; Referee: Pedro Pérez Montero

31 January 2016 22	Real Madrid	6–0	Espanyol	Madrid
20:30 CET (UTC+01:00)	Benzema 7'; Ronaldo 12' (pen.), 45', 82'; Rodríguez 16'; Ó. Duarte 86' (o.g.)	Report	Pérez (yellow card) 11'; Diop (yellow card) 37'; López (yellow card) 42'; Sylla (yellow card) 42'; Álvaro (yellow card) 77'	Stadium: Santiago Bernabéu; Attendance: 65,678; Referee: Alejandro Hernández Hernández

7 February 2016 23	Espanyol	0–5	Real Sociedad	Barcelona
20:30 (UTC+1)	Diop (yellow card) 19'	Report	Jonathas 5', 90', (yellow card) 90+1'; Vela 8'; Oyarzabal 52'; Reyes 55'; Zaldúa (yellow card) 79'	Stadium: Cornellà-El Prat; Attendance: 14,155; Referee: Santiago Jaime Latre

14 February 2016 24	Valencia	2–1	Espanyol	Valencia
20:30 CET (UTC+01:00)	Pérez (yellow card) 33'; Negredo 71'; Cheryshev 76'	Report	Álvaro (yellow card) 13'; Diop (yellow card) 43'; Ó. Duarte 52'; Abraham (yellow card) 58'	Stadium: Mestalla; Attendance: 34,689; Referee: Carlos del Cerro Grande

21 February 2016 25	Espanyol	1–0	Deportivo La Coruña	Barcelona
18:00 CET (UTC+01:00)	Asensio (yellow card) 19', (goal) 52'; Sánchez (yellow card) 57'; Caicedo (yellow card) 90+3'	Report	Arribas (yellow card) 47'	Stadium: Cornellà-El Prat; Attendance: 28,455; Referee: Ricardo de Burgos Bengoetxea

27 February 2016 26	Sporting de Gijón	2–4	Espanyol	Gijón
18:15	Mascarell (yellow card) 15'; Castro 20', 62', (yellow card) 66'; Meré (yellow card) 35'; I. López (yellow card) 77'; Sanabria (yellow card) 82'; Cases (red card) 83'	Report	J. López (yellow card) 17'; Burgui 41'; Gerard 48', 58'; Hernández 80' (o.g.); Ó. Duarte (yellow card) 90+1'	Stadium: El Molinón; Attendance: 22,555; Referee: Carlos Velasco Carballo

2 March 2016 27	Espanyol	0–3	Real Betis	Barcelona
20:30	Caicedo (yellow card) 41'; Pérez (yellow card) 70'; Ó. Duarte (yellow card) 81'; Sánchez (yellow card) 82'	Report	Castro 10'; Bruno (yellow card) 18'; Pezzella 20'; Molinero (yellow card) 69'; Vargas 71'	Stadium: Cornellà-El Prat; Attendance: 23,714; Referee: José María Sánchez Martínez

6 March 2016 28	Espanyol	2–1	Rayo Vallecano	Barcelona
20:30 CET (UTC+01:00)	Abraham 12'; Sánchez (yellow card) 24' (yellow-red card) 89'; Pérez 77'; López (yellow card) 81'; Diop (yellow card) 89'; Álvaro (yellow card) 90+1'	Report	Crespo (yellow card) 15'; Embarba (yellow card) 31'; Bebé 67'; Baena (yellow card) 70'; Guerra (yellow card) 89'	Stadium: Cornellà-El Prat; Attendance: 22,638; Referee: David Fernández Borbalán

13 March 2016 29	Granada	1–1	Espanyol	Granada
20:30 CET (UTC+01:00)	Barral (yellow card) 5' (yellow-red card) 28'; Rochina 40', (yellow card) 79'; Biraghi (yellow card) 45'; Lombán (yellow card) 54'; Fernández (yellow card) 80'; Pérez (yellow card) 89'	Report	Ó. Duarte (yellow card) 50'; R. Duarte (yellow card) 58'; Pérez (yellow card) 68'; Lopes 82' (o.g.)	Stadium: Los Cármenes; Attendance: 15,213; Referee: José González González

20 March 2016 30	Espanyol	2–1	Athletic Bilbao	Barcelona
12:00 CET (UTC+01:00)	Diop 54'; Caicedo 57'; Álvaro (yellow card) 60'; Pérez (yellow card) 86'; Pau (yellow card) 90+3'	Report	Eraso 20'; Rico (yellow card) 47'; Lekue (yellow card) 84'; Beñat (yellow card) 90+6'	Stadium: Cornellà-El Prat; Attendance: 20,753; Referee: Eduardo Prieto Iglesias

3 April 2016 31	Málaga	1–1	Espanyol	Málaga
CET (UTC+01:00)	Charles (yellow card) 25'; Čop 45' (pen.); Camacho (yellow card) 62'	Report	Diop 11'; R. Duarte (yellow card) 25'; López (yellow card) 48'; Ó. Duarte (yellow card) 63'; Pérez (yellow card) 83'	Stadium: La Rosaleda; Attendance: 25,368; Referee: Juan Martínez Munuera

9 April 2016 32	Espanyol	1–3	Atlético Madrid	Barcelona
18:15 CEST (UTC+02:00)	Sánchez (yellow card) 4'; Diop 29', (yellow card) 45'	Report	Torres 35'; Griezmann 58'; Filipe Luís (yellow card) 70'; Correa (yellow card) 78'; Koke 89'	Stadium: Cornellà-El Prat; Attendance: 26,338; Referee: Ricardo de Burgos Bengoetxea

17 April 2016 33	Levante	2–1	Espanyol	Valencia
20:30 CET (UTC+01:00)	Deyverson (yellow card) 13'; Rossi 23'; Lerma (yellow card) 39'; Medjani 66'; Juanfran (yellow card) 72'; Verza (yellow card) 78'; Cuero (yellow card) 83'	Report	Pérez 7'	Stadium: Ciutat de València; Attendance: 16,192; Referee: Alejandro Hernández Hernández

20 April 2016 34	Espanyol	1–1	Celta Vigo	Barcelona
20:00 CET (UTC+01:00)	Sánchez (yellow card) 10'; Asensio 39'	Report	Aspas 28'; Hernández (yellow card) 89'	Stadium: Cornellà-El Prat; Attendance: 14,227; Referee: Eduardo Prieto Iglesias

22 April 2016 35	Las Palmas	4–0	Espanyol	Las Palmas
21:00 CET (UTC+01:00)	David Simón (yellow card) 11'; Gómez (yellow card) 28'; El Zhar 45+1', (yellow card) 90+2'; Viera 49'; Bigas 56'; Mubarak 75'; Castellano (yellow card) 85'	Report	Diop (yellow card) 9'; López (yellow card) 55'; Sylla (yellow card) 58'; Roco (yellow card) 69'	Stadium: Gran Canaria; Attendance: 19,358; Referee: Mario Melero López

1 May 2016 36	Espanyol	1–0	Sevilla	Barcelona
21:00 CET (UTC+01:00)	Caicedo 52'; Cañas (yellow card) 77'; Ó. Duarte (yellow card) 87'; González (yellow card) 90+2'	Report	Figueiras (yellow card) 78'; Iborra (yellow card) 90+2'	Stadium: Cornellà-El Prat; Attendance: 27,654; Referee: Juan Martínez Munuera

8 May 2016 37	Barcelona	5–0	Espanyol	Barcelona
17:00 CEST (UTC+02:00)	Messi 8', (yellow card) 12'; Suárez 52', 61'; Rafinha 74'; Neymar 83'; Mascherano (yellow card) 90'	Report	Diop (yellow card) 18'; Pérez (yellow card) 27'; Álvarez (yellow card) 36'; Cañas (yellow card) 39'; López (yellow card) 63'; Pau (yellow card) 69'; Rober (yellow card) 69'	Stadium: Camp Nou; Attendance: 91,610; Referee: Jesús Gil Manzano

15 May 2016 38	Espanyol	4–2	Eibar	Barcelona
19:00 CEST (UTC+02:00)	Moreno 13', 76'; Asensio (yellow card) 32', (goal) 66'; Sánchez (yellow card) 43'; Roco (yellow card) 57'; Pérez (yellow card) 60'; Rober (yellow card) 85'	Report	Borja (yellow card) 20', (goal) 57' (pen.); Mauro (yellow card) 30'; Enrich 90'; Escalante (yellow card) 90+2'	Stadium: Cornellà-El Prat; Attendance: 13,501; Referee: Mario Melero López

== See also ==
2015–16 La Liga

2015–16 Copa del Rey
