= Juan Muñoz (footballer, born 1985) =

Spanish-Swiss footballer

Personal information
- Full name: Juan Manuel Muñoz
- Date of birth: 11 January 1985 (age 41)
- Place of birth: Spain
- Height: 1.72 m (5 ft 8 in)
- Position: Defender

Senior career*
Years	Team	Apps	(Gls)
2003–2007	Neuchâtel Xamax	21	(0)
2007–2008	FC Chiasso	13	(0)
2008–2009	FC Stade Nyonnais		
2009–2010	SV Muttenz		
2010–2013	FC Solothurn		
2013–2015	FC Béroche-Gorgier		
2015–2017	FC Grünstern		
2017–2022	ASI Audax-Friul		
- * Club domestic league appearances and goals

Juan Manuel Muñoz (born 11 January 1985) is a Spanish–Swiss former football player.

He played six games in Swiss Super League before followed Neuchâtel Xamax relegated in summer 2006.

While Neuchâtel Xamax came back to top division in summer 2007, he stayed in Swiss Challenge League with his new club Chiasso.
