= 2006–07 Swiss Cup =

Tournament details
- Country: Switzerland

Final positions
- Champions: FC Basel
- Runners-up: FC Luzern

The 2006–07 Swiss Cup was the 82nd season of Switzerland's annual cup competition. It began on 25 August with the first games of Round 1 and ended on 28 May 2007 with the Final held at Stade de Suisse, Wankdorf, Bern. The winners earned a place in the second qualifying round of the UEFA Cup.

== Round 1 ==
| Team 1 | Score | Team 2 |
|---|---|---|
25 August 2006
| FC Herisau | 1–3 (a.e.t.) | FC Locarno |
| Zug 94 | 1–1 (a.e.t.) (p. 5–6) | FC Wil |
| CS Romontois | 1–1 (a.e.t.) (p. 6–5) | ES Belfaux |
| FC Alle | 1–2 | SR Delémont |
| FC Kickers Luzern | 1–5 | FC Wohlen |
26 August 2006
| FC Schötz | 0–2 | FC Baulmes |
| FC Fribourg | 1–9 | SC Kriens |
| SV Schaffhausen | 2–5 | AC Lugano |
| FC Einsiedeln | 0–14 | FC St. Gallen |
| FC Kölliken | 0–8 | FC Luzern |
| FC Phönix Seen | 0–11 | FC Zürich |
| FC Wangen bei Olten | 1–0 | FC Concordia Basel |
| Le Locle Sports | 0–1 | Yverdon-Sport FC |
| FC Signal | 1–3 | FC Meyrin |
| FC Hünibach | 1–6 | FC La Chaux-de-Fonds |
| FC Le Mont | 0–1 | Servette FC |
| FC Brunnen | 5–1 | FC Bellach |
| FC Liestal | 1–6 | FC Basel |
| FC Ascona | 1–5 | AC Bellinzona |
| FC Rapid Lugano | 0–9 | FC Schaffhausen |
27 August 2006
| FC Naters | 1–3 | FC Sion |
| SC Bümpliz 78 | 0–4 | FC Lausanne-Sport |
| FC Monthey | 0–1 | BSC Young Boys |
| FC Staad | 1–2 | SC YF Juventus |
| SC Baudepartement BS | 1–1 (a.e.t.) (p. 4–5) | FC Nordstern BS |
| GC Biaschesi | 1–5 | Grasshoppers |
| SC Cham | 1–3 | FC Aarau |
| Stade Nyonnais | 0–6 | FC Thun |
| FC Bazenheid | 0–1 | FC Chiasso |
| FC Flums | 0–12 | FC Winterthur |
| SV Lyss | 8–1 | FC Perly-Certoux |
| FC Bulle | 2–2 (a.e.t.) (p. 2–4) | Neuchâtel Xamax FC |

== Round 2 ==
| Team 1 | Score | Team 2 |
|---|---|---|
29 September 2006
| Neuchâtel Xamax FC | 0–3 | BSC Young Boys |
| FC Locarno | 0–1 | FC Schaffhausen |
| AC Bellinzona | 0–1 | FC Chiasso |
30 September 2006
| FC Meyrin | 2–3 | FC Thun |
| FC Wangen bei Olten | 1–4 | FC Zürich |
| FC Wohlen | 1–3 | FC Winterthur |
| FC Brunnen | 0–5 | FC Wil |
| FC Nordstern BS | 0–4 | FC St. Gallen |
| FC Lausanne-Sport | 0–1 (a.e.t.) | FC Aarau |
1 October 2006
| SC Kriens | 0–4 | FC Luzern |
| AC Lugano | 0–4 | FC Basel |
| SV Lyss | 1–3 | SR Delémont |
| FC La Chaux-de-Fonds | 1–3 | FC Sion |
| Yverdon-Sport FC | 2–2 (a.e.t.) (p. 3–1) | Servette FC |
| SC YF Juventus | 3–4 | Grasshoppers |
11 October 2006
| CS Romontois | 0–0 (a.e.t.) (p. 2–4) | FC Baulmes |

== Round 3 ==
| Team 1 | Score | Team 2 |
|---|---|---|
11 November 2006
| Yverdon-Sport FC | 2–5 | FC Zürich |
| Grasshoppers | 1–0 | FC Thun |
12 November 2006
| FC Luzern | 2–0 | FC Schaffhausen |
| BSC Young Boys | 3–0 | FC Sion |
| FC Baulmes | 2–3 (a.e.t.) | FC Basel |
| FC Winterthur | 1–2 | FC Aarau |
| SR Delémont | 1–3 | FC St. Gallen |
| FC Chiasso | 2–2 (a.e.t.) (p. 2–4) | FC Wil |

== Quarter-finals ==
| Team 1 | Score | Team 2 |
|---|---|---|
14 March 2007
| FC Zürich | 1–0 | FC St. Gallen |
| FC Basel | 1–0 | FC Aarau |
15 March 2007
| FC Luzern | 3–1 | Grasshoppers |
| FC Wil | 2–1 | BSC Young Boys |

== Semi-finals ==
| Team 1 | Score | Team 2 |
|---|---|---|
26 April 2007
| FC Wil | 1–3 | FC Basel |
| FC Zürich | 2–3 | FC Luzern |

== Final ==
28 May 2007
15:00

| FC Basel | 1 – 0 | FC Luzern |
|---|---|---|
| Majstorović (yellow card) 74', (goal) 90+3' (pen.) | FCB Summary | (yellow card) 34' Diethelm; (red card) 90+1' Zibung |

Stade de Suisse, Wankdorf, Bern
Attendance: 30,000 (sold out)
Referee: (Switzerland) Nicole Petignat
