= 2003–04 Sporting de Gijón season =

Real Sporting
2003–04 season
- Chairman: Manuel Vega-Arango
- Manager: Marcelino García Toral
- Stadium: El Molinón
- Segunda División: 5th
- Copa del Rey: Round of 64
- Top goalscorer: Mate Bilić (15)
- Average home league attendance: 15,857

The 2003–04 Sporting de Gijón season was the sixth consecutive season of the club in Segunda División after its last relegation from La Liga.

== Overview ==
In July 2003, due to the financial difficulties, Real Sporting sold David Villa to Zaragoza by €2.5m

On 15 February 2004, in the game at Algeciras, Roberto beat the record for the longest clean sheet in Real Sporting at 727 minutes.

On 23 May 2004, Real Sporting earned one point at SD Eibar in the additional time, in a game where the rojiblancos ended with eight players after the referee sent off Yago, Cristian Díaz and David Bauzá in ten minutes.

Real Sporting ended the season in the fifth position, finally failing to promote and with 13 red cards.

== Squad ==
Note: Flags indicate national team as defined under FIFA eligibility rules; some limited exceptions apply. Players may hold more than one non-FIFA nationality.

No.	Pos.	Nation	Player
1	GK	ESP	Juanjo Valencia
3	DF	ESP	Chus Bravo
4	DF	ESP	Isma
5	MF	ESP	Samuel
6	DF	ESP	Yago
7	MF	ESP	Miguel Cobas
8	MF	ESP	Juan
9	FW	CRO	Mate Bilić
10	FW	ESP	Rubén Suárez
11	MF	ESP	David Bauzá
12	DF	ESP	Diego Alegre
13	GK	ESP	Roberto

No.	Pos.	Nation	Player
14	DF	ARG	Cristian Díaz
15	FW	ESP	Irurzun
16	DF	NED	Jeffrey
17	MF	ESP	Álvaro Varela
18	MF	ESP	Pablo Álvarez
19	FW	ESP	Miguel
20	FW	ESP	David Lago
21	MF	ESP	Abel Segovia
22	DF	ESP	Rafel Sastre
23	MF	ESP	Dani Borreguero
24	DF	ESP	Javier Dorado

=== From the youth squad ===
Note: Flags indicate national team as defined under FIFA eligibility rules; some limited exceptions apply. Players may hold more than one non-FIFA nationality.

No.	Pos.	Nation	Player
26	MF	ESP	Gerardo
27	DF	ESP	Alejandro Vázquez

No.	Pos.	Nation	Player
28	MF	ESP	Carlos Casquero
29	MF	ESP	Javi Fuego

== Competitions ==
=== Segunda División ===
==== Results by round ====
Round	1	2	3	4	5	6	7	8	9	10	11	12	13	14	15	16	17	18	19	20	21	22	23	24	25	26	27	28	29	30	31	32	33	34	35	36	37	38	39	40	41	42
Ground	H	A	H	A	H	A	H	A	H	A	H	A	H	A	H	A	H	A	A	H	A	A	H	A	H	A	H	A	H	A	H	A	H	A	H	A	H	A	H	H	A	H
Result	L	L	W	D	D	W	D	L	W	D	W	L	W	W	W	L	W	W	W	W	D	W	W	W	D	L	D	W	L	L	W	L	W	L	D	D	W	D	L	W	L	W
Position	21	22	16	17	17	11	11	14	7	7	6	9	7	7	3	6	5	3	3	1	1	1	1	1	1	1	1	1	2	3	3	3	3	4	4	4	4	4	5	5	5	5

Source: BDFutbol
A = Away; H = Home; W = Win; D = Draw; L = Loss

==== League table ====
Pos	Team	Pld	W	D	L	GF	GA	GD	Pts	Promotion or relegation
3	Numancia (P)	42	22	10	10	60	30	+30	76 (Note: NUM 0-0 GET; GET 2-1 NUM)	Promotion to La Liga
4	Alavés	42	20	14	8	48	32	+16	74	
5	Sporting Gijón	42	20	10	12	58	40	+18	70	
6	Recreativo	42	14	20	8	45	34	+11	62	
7	Cádiz	42	17	10	15	52	47	+5	61	

Source: LFP - Liga Adelante
Rules for classification: 1st points; 2nd head-to-head points; 3rd head-to-head goal difference; 4th head-to-head goals scored; 5th goal difference; 6th number of goals scored; 7th Fair-play points
(P) Promoted

==== Matches ====
31 August 2003 1	Real Sporting	0–1	Getafe	Gijón
		Summary	Míchel 52'; Vivar Dorado 90'	Stadium: El Molinón; Referee: Castillo Estévez

7 September 2003 2	Alavés	2–1	Real Sporting	Vitoria-Gasteiz
	Trotta 23'; Edu Alonso 46'	Summary	Irurzun 16'	Stadium: Mendizorrotza; Referee: Ayza Gámez

14 September 2003 3	Real Sporting	3–2	Algeciras	Gijón
	Bilić 45', 57'; Miguel 90'	Summary	Bayarri 36'; Zárate 59'	Stadium: El Molinón; Referee: Delgado Ferreiro

21 September 2003 4	Recreativo	1–1	Real Sporting	Huelva
	Sastre 41' (o.g.)	Summary	Pablo Álvarez 84'	Stadium: Nuevo Colombino; Referee: Rodado Rodríguez

28 September 2003 5	Real Sporting	1–1	Córdoba	Gijón
	Irurzun 29'	Report	Olivera 24'; Juanmi (red card) 80'	Stadium: El Molinón; Referee: Bastos Martínez

5 October 2003 6	Salamanca	0–2	Real Sporting	Villares de la Reina
		Summary	Segovia 8'; Dani Borreguero 9'	Stadium: Helmántico; Referee: Ontanaya López

12 October 2003 7	Real Sporting	1–1	Las Palmas	Gijón
	Pablo Álvarez (red card) 24'; Dani Borreguero 49'	Summary	Carmelo (red card) 24'; Rubén Castro 81'	Stadium: El Molinón; Referee: Fernández Hinojosa

18 October 2003 8	Levante	2–1	Real Sporting	Valencia
	Rivera 61'; Cuéllar 79'	Summary	Sastre 27'	Stadium: Ciutat de València; Referee: Castillo Estévez

26 October 2003 9	Real Sporting	3–0	Xerez	Gijón
	Juan 42'; David Bauzá 75'; Dani Borreguero 89'	Report	Borja (yellow card) (yellow-red card) 71'	Stadium: El Molinón; Referee: Rubio Iniesta

2 November 2003 10	Polideportivo Ejido	0–0	Real Sporting	El Ejido
		Report		Stadium: Santo Domingo; Referee: Pérez Lima

9 November 2003 11	Real Sporting	1–0	Terrassa	Gijón
	Bilić 39'	Summary		Stadium: El Molinón; Referee: Arcas Piqueres

16 November 2003 12	Rayo Vallecano	2–1	Real Sporting	Madrid
	Biagini 1'; Peragón 75'	Report	Cristian Díaz (red card) 30'; Miguel 69'; Sastre (yellow card) (yellow-red card) 81'	Stadium: Vallecas; Referee: González González

23 November 2003 13	Real Sporting	2–0	Elche	Gijón
	Yago 46'; Bilić 53'	Report	Taševski (yellow card) (yellow-red card) 43'	Stadium: El Molinón; Referee: Velasco Carballo

30 November 2003 14	Leganés	1–3	Real Sporting	Leganés
	Borja 11'; Alessandría (red card) 17'	Report	Pablo Álvarez 69', 87'; Rubén 83'	Stadium: Butarque; Referee: Fernández Borbalán

7 December 2003 15	Real Sporting	1–0	Numancia	Gijón
	Cristian Díaz (red card) 3'; Bilić 47'	Summary		Stadium: El Molinón; Referee: Pérez Pérez

14 December 2003 16	Ciudad de Murcia	3–2	Real Sporting	Murcia
	Aguilar 50'; Camuñas 67'; Godino 83'	Summary	Bilić 30'; Irurzun 87'	Stadium: La Condomina; Referee: García Delgado

21 December 2003 17	Real Sporting	1–0	Eibar	Gijón
	Miguel 30'	Summary		Stadium: El Molinón; Referee: Paradas Romero

3 January 2004 18	Tenerife	0–1	Real Sporting	Santa Cruz de Tenerife
		Summary	Pablo Álvarez 78'	Stadium: Heliodoro Rodríguez López; Referee: Arcas Piqueres

11 January 2004 19	Cádiz	0–1	Real Sporting	Cádiz
	Suárez (yellow card) (yellow-red card) 72'; De Quintana (red card) 81'	Summary	Bilić 72'	Stadium: Ramón de Carranza; Referee: Clos Gómez

18 January 2004 20	Real Sporting	2–0	Almería	Gijón
	Bilić 73'; Miguel 77'	Report	Jaime Ramos (yellow card) (yellow-red card) 70'	Stadium: El Molinón; Referee: Pérez Lima

26 January 2004 21	Málaga B	0–0	Real Sporting	Málaga
		Summary	Vázquez (yellow card) (yellow-red card) 39'	Stadium: La Rosaleda; Referee: Orueta Ibarrola

1 February 2004 22	Getafe	0–2	Real Sporting	Getafe
		Report	Pablo Álvarez 57'; Rubén 90'	Stadium: Coliseum; Referee: Villanueva Angulo

8 February 2004 23	Real Sporting	2–0	Alavés	Gijón
	Cristian Díaz 17'; Pablo Álvarez 86'	Summary		Stadium: El Molinón; Referee: Valle Gil

13 February 2004 24	Algeciras	0–3	Real Sporting	Algeciras
		Summary	Bilić 9', 45'; Rubén 74'	Stadium: Nuevo Mirador; Referee: Herráez Prieto

22 February 2004 25	Real Sporting	0–0	Recreativo	Gijón
		Summary		Stadium: El Molinón; Referee: Delgado Ferreiro

29 February 2004 26	Córdoba	4–1	Real Sporting	Córdoba
	Olivera 12', 84'; Ariel Montenegro 54'; Silvio González 90'	Summary	Samuel (red card) 13'; Bilić 35'; Cristian Díaz (yellow card) (yellow-red card) 77'	Stadium: Nuevo Arcángel; Referee: Arcas Piqueres

7 March 2004 27	Real Sporting	1–1	Salamanca	Gijón
	Dani Borreguero 57'	Summary	David Cano 71'	Stadium: El Molinón; Referee: Castillo Estévez

14 March 2004 28	Las Palmas	1–2	Real Sporting	Las Palmas
	Momo 60'	Summary	Irurzun 78'; Miguel 88'	Stadium: Gran Canaria; Referee: Ontanaya López

21 March 2004 29	Real Sporting	1–2	Levante	Gijón
	Rubén 79'	Summary	Rivera 32', 77'	Stadium: El Molinón; Referee: Clos Gómez

28 March 2004 30	Xerez	2–1	Real Sporting	Jerez de la Frontera
	Del Pino 15'; (yellow card) (yellow-red card) 61'; Mena 90'	Summary	Rubén 87'; Samuel (yellow card) (yellow-red card) 89'	Stadium: Chapín; Referee: Martínez Franco

4 April 2004 31	Real Sporting	1–0	Polideportivo Ejido	Gijón
	Bilić 68'	Summary		Stadium: El Molinón; Referee: Caballero Herreros

10 April 2004 32	Terrassa	1–0	Real Sporting	Terrassa
	Quique Martín 3'; Navas (yellow card) (yellow-red card) 87'; Maikel (yellow card) (yellow-red card) 89'	Summary	Cristian Díaz (red card) 14'	Stadium: Olímpic; Referee: Fernández Borbalán

17 April 2004 33	Real Sporting	3–1	Rayo Vallecano	Gijón
	Bilić 21'; Miguel 53', 61'	Summary	Azkoitia 31'	Stadium: El Molinón; Referee: Bastos Martínez

24 April 2004 34	Elche	2–1	Real Sporting	Elche
	Moisés 5'; Nino 69'; Tortolero (yellow card) (yellow-red card) 80'	Summary	Bilić 74'; Jeffrey (red card) 83'	Stadium: Manuel Martínez Valero; Referee: Castillo Estévez

2 May 2004 35	Real Sporting	1–1	Leganés	Gijón
	Diego Alegre 45'	Summary	Calandria 55'	Stadium: El Molinón; Referee: Herráez Prieto

9 May 2004 36	Numancia	1–1	Real Sporting	Soria
	Octavio (red card) 19'; Moreno 61'	Summary	Juan (yellow card) (yellow-red card) 57'; Irurzun 84'	Stadium: Los Pajaritos; Referee: Valle Gil

16 May 2004 37	Real Sporting	4–1	Ciudad de Murcia	Gijón
	João Pinto 38' (o.g.); Bilić 52'; Miguel 58'; Rubén 73'	Summary	Godino 88'	Stadium: El Molinón; Referee: Paradas Romero

23 May 2004 38	Eibar	2–2	Real Sporting	Eibar
	Brit 49', 69'; Saizar (red card) 78'	Summary	Dani Borreguero 50'; Yago (yellow card) (yellow-red card) 76'; David Bauzá (yellow card) (yellow-red card) 77'; Cristian Díaz (red card) 78'; Rubén 90'	Stadium: Ipurua; Referee: Rodado Rodríguez

29 May 2004 39	Real Sporting	0–2	Tenerife	Gijón
		Summary	Corona 80'; Jesús Vázquez 86'	Stadium: El Molinón; Referee: García Delgado

6 June 2004 40	Real Sporting	2–0	Cádiz	Gijón
	Pablo Álvarez 34'; Dani Borreguero 83'	Summary		Stadium: El Molinón; Referee: Amoedo Chas

5 June 2004 41	Almería	2–1	Real Sporting	Almería
	Francisco 55'; Ortiz 66'	Summary	Irurzun 57'	Stadium: Mediterráneo; Referee: Fernández Hinojosa

19 June 2004 42	Real Sporting	1–0	Málaga B	Gijón
	Álvaro Varela 9'	Summary		Stadium: El Molinón; Referee: Pérez Lima

=== Copa del Rey ===
==== Matches ====
8 October 2003 Round of 64	Real Sporting	0–1	Eibar	Gijón
		Report	Cuevas 84'	Stadium: El Molinón; Referee: Villanueva Angulo

== Squad statistics ==
=== Appearances and goals ===
No.	Pos	Nat	Player	Total		Segunda División		Copa del Rey	
No.	Pos	Nat	Player	Apps	Goals	Apps	Goals	Apps	Goals
1	GK	(Spain) ESP	Juanjo Valencia	3	0	3+0	0	0+0	0
3	DF	(Spain) ESP	Chus Bravo	6	0	5+1	0	0+0	0
4	DF	(Spain) ESP	Isma	0	0	0+0	0	0+0	0
5	DF	(Spain) ESP	Samuel	39	0	36+2	0	1+0	0
6	DF	(Spain) ESP	Yago	38	1	37+0	1	1+0	0
7	MF	(Spain) ESP	Miguel Cobas	2	0	0+2	0	0+0	0
8	MF	(Spain) ESP	Juan	37	1	34+3	1	0+0	0
9	FW	(Croatia) CRO	Mate Bilić	42	15	38+3	15	0+1	0
10	FW	(Spain) ESP	Rubén Suárez	29	6	6+23	6	0+0	0
11	MF	(Spain) ESP	David Bauzá	26	2	17+9	2	0+0	0
12	DF	(Spain) ESP	Diego Alegre	23	1	17+5	1	1+0	0
13	GK	(Spain) ESP	Roberto	40	0	39+0	0	1+0	0
14	DF	(Argentina) ARG	Cristian Díaz	27	1	27+0	1	0+0	0
15	MF	(Spain) ESP	Irurzun	41	6	20+20	6	1+0	0
16	DF	(Netherlands) NED	Jeffrey	5	0	4+1	0	0+0	0
17	MF	(Spain) ESP	Álvaro Varela	2	1	1+1	1	0+0	0
18	MF	(Spain) ESP	Pablo Álvarez	36	7	32+3	7	0+1	0
19	FW	(Spain) ESP	Miguel	39	8	23+15	8	1+0	0
20	FW	(Spain) ESP	David Lago	1	0	1+0	0	0+0	0
21	MF	(Spain) ESP	Abel Segovia	21	1	9+11	1	1+0	0
22	DF	(Spain) ESP	Rafel Sastre	37	1	31+5	1	1+0	0
23	MF	(Spain) ESP	Dani Borreguero	36	6	34+1	6	1+0	0
24	DF	(Spain) ESP	Javier Dorado	40	0	38+1	0	1+0	0
26	MF	(Spain) ESP	Gerardo	13	0	3+9	0	1+0	0
27	DF	(Spain) ESP	Alejandro Vázquez	2	0	2+0	0	0+0	0
28	MF	(Spain) ESP	Carlos Casquero	3	0	1+2	0	0+0	0
29	MF	(Spain) ESP	Javi Fuego	12	0	4+7	0	0+1	0
