= 2004–05 Sporting de Gijón season =

Real Sporting
2004–05 season
- Chairman: Manuel Vega-Arango
- Manager: Marcelino García Toral
- Stadium: El Molinón
- Segunda División: 11th
- Copa del Rey: Round of 64
- Top goalscorer: Irurzun (14)
- Average home league attendance: 11,424

The 2004–05 Sporting de Gijón season was the seventh consecutive season of the club in Segunda División after its last relegation from La Liga.

== Overview ==
Real Sporting finished the season in the eleventh position.

Due to the high debts, Real Sporting was close to be administratively relegated at the end of the season.

== Squad ==
Note: Flags indicate national team as defined under FIFA eligibility rules; some limited exceptions apply. Players may hold more than one non-FIFA nationality.

| No. | Pos. | Nation | Player |
|---|---|---|---|
| 1 | GK | ESP | Rafa |
| 2 | DF | ESP | Neru |
| 3 | DF | ESP | Chus Bravo |
| 4 | DF | ESP | Isma |
| 5 | MF | ESP | Samuel |
| 6 | MF | ESP | Javi Fuego |
| 7 | FW | ARG | Leonardo Biagini |
| 8 | MF | ESP | Juan |
| 9 | FW | ARG | Pablo Calandria |
| 10 | MF | ESP | Carlos Casquero |
| 11 | MF | ESP | David Bauzá |
| 12 | DF | ESP | Diego Alegre |

| No. | Pos. | Nation | Player |
|---|---|---|---|
| 13 | GK | ESP | Roberto |
| 14 | DF | ARG | Cristian Díaz |
| 15 | FW | ESP | Irurzun |
| 16 | DF | ARG | Ángel Pérez |
| 18 | MF | ESP | Pablo Álvarez |
| 19 | FW | BRA | Arthuro |
| 20 | DF | NED | Jeffrey |
| 21 | MF | ESP | Pablo Lago |
| 22 | DF | ESP | Rafel Sastre (captain) |
| 23 | MF | ESP | Dani Borreguero |
| 24 | DF | ESP | Javier Dorado |

=== From the youth squad ===
Note: Flags indicate national team as defined under FIFA eligibility rules; some limited exceptions apply. Players may hold more than one non-FIFA nationality.

| No. | Pos. | Nation | Player |
|---|---|---|---|
| 26 | MF | ESP | Gerardo |
| 27 | DF | ESP | Alejandro Vázquez |
| 28 | DF | ESP | Ibón Díez |
| 29 | MF | ESP | Chus López |

| No. | Pos. | Nation | Player |
|---|---|---|---|
| 31 | DF | ESP | Miguel Carmena |
| 32 | FW | ESP | Antonio Rojas |
| 34 | FW | ESP | Omar |

== Competitions ==
=== Segunda División ===
==== Results by round ====
| Round | 1 | 2 | 3 | 4 | 5 | 6 | 7 | 8 | 9 | 10 | 11 | 12 | 13 | 14 | 15 | 16 | 17 | 18 | 19 | 20 | 21 | 22 | 23 | 24 | 25 | 26 | 27 | 28 | 29 | 30 | 31 | 32 | 33 | 34 | 35 | 36 | 37 | 38 | 39 | 40 | 41 | 42 |
|---|---|---|---|---|---|---|---|---|---|---|---|---|---|---|---|---|---|---|---|---|---|---|---|---|---|---|---|---|---|---|---|---|---|---|---|---|---|---|---|---|---|---|
| Ground | H | A | H | A | H | A | H | A | H | A | H | A | H | A | H | A | H | A | H | A | H | A | H | A | H | A | H | A | H | A | H | A | H | A | H | A | H | A | H | A | H | A |
| Result | L | W | W | D | D | L | L | D | W | L | D | L | D | W | W | D | L | W | W | L | L | D | W | L | W | D | W | L | W | D | W | L | D | W | W | L | D | L | D | L | L | W |
| Position | 15 | 8 | 7 | 9 | 8 | 14 | 16 | 16 | 10 | 15 | 14 | 16 | 16 | 15 | 15 | 15 | 16 | 14 | 10 | 13 | 13 | 14 | 12 | 12 | 12 | 10 | 10 | 11 | 10 | 10 | 8 | 8 | 8 | 9 | 7 | 8 | 7 | 9 | 9 | 11 | 10 | 11 |

Source: BDFutbol
A = Away; H = Home; W = Win; D = Draw; L = Loss

==== League table ====
| Pos | Team | Pld | W | D | L | GF | GA | GD | Pts |
|---|---|---|---|---|---|---|---|---|---|
| 9 | Tenerife | 42 | 13 | 18 | 11 | 42 | 45 | −3 | 57 (Note: TEN: 8 pts; ELC: 4 pts → ELC 4-0 SPG; SPG: 4 pts → SPG 3-1 ELC) |
| 10 | Elche | 42 | 16 | 9 | 17 | 51 | 52 | −1 | 57 |
| 11 | Sporting Gijón | 42 | 15 | 12 | 15 | 41 | 39 | +2 | 57 |
| 12 | Murcia | 42 | 15 | 9 | 18 | 40 | 52 | −12 | 54 |
| 13 | Poli Ejido | 42 | 12 | 16 | 14 | 41 | 45 | −4 | 52 |

Source: LFP – Liga Adelante
Rules for classification: 1st points; 2nd head-to-head points; 3rd head-to-head goal difference; 4th head-to-head goals scored; 5th goal difference; 6th number of goals scored; 7th Fair-play points

==== Matches ====
| 29 August 2004 1 | Real Sporting | 0–1 | Recreativo | Gijón |
| | Jeffrey (yellow card) 0' (yellow-red card) 81' | Summary | Ángel Rodríguez 51' | Stadium: El Molinón; Referee: Pérez Lima |

| 5 September 2004 2 | Murcia | 1–3 | Real Sporting | Murcia |
| | Carrera 76' | Summary | Calandria 10'; Olave 57' (o.g.); Pablo Álvarez 81' | Stadium: La Condomina; Referee: Álvarez Izquierdo |

| 12 September 2004 3 | Real Sporting | 1–0 | Celta | Gijón |
| | Javi Fuego 55' | Summary | Nagore (red card) 44' | Stadium: El Molinón; Referee: García Delgado |

| 18 September 2004 4 | Racing Ferrol | 0–0 | Real Sporting | Ferrol |
| | | Summary | | Stadium: A Malata; Referee: Castillo Estévez |

| 26 September 2004 5 | Real Sporting | 0–0 | Cádiz | Gijón |
| | | Report | | Stadium: El Molinón; Referee: González González |

| 4 October 2004 6 | Málaga B | 1–0 | Real Sporting | Málaga |
| | Ador 32' | Summary | | Stadium: La Rosaleda; Referee: Pérez Pérez |

| 10 October 2004 7 | Real Sporting | 1–2 | Salamanca | Gijón |
| | Pablo Álvarez 31' | Summary | Zé Tó 1', 87'; Tomás 87' | Stadium: El Molinón; Referee: Téllez Sánchez |

| 16 October 2004 8 | Polideportivo Ejido | 1–1 | Real Sporting | El Ejido |
| | Manolo 76' | Summary | Irurzun 19' | Stadium: Santo Domingo; Referee: Bernabé García |

| 24 October 2004 9 | Real Sporting | 3–1 | Córdoba | Gijón |
| | Irurzun 58', 75'; Juan 64' | Report | Armentano 4' | Stadium: El Molinón; Referee: Martínez Franco |

| 31 October 2004 10 | Elche | 4–0 | Real Sporting | Elche |
| | Txiki 22'; Nino 59'; Rubén 72'; Peragón 77' | Report | Gerardo (yellow card) 0' (yellow-red card) 51'; Pablo Álvarez (red card) 76' | Stadium: Manuel Martínez Valero; Referee: Pérez Lima |

| 7 November 2004 11 | Real Sporting | 1–1 | Valladolid | Gijón |
| | Irurzun 60' | Summary | Figueredo 90' | Stadium: El Molinón; Referee: Álvarez Izquierdo |

| 14 November 2004 12 | Tenerife | 1–0 | Real Sporting | Santa Cruz de Tenerife |
| | Jesús Vázquez 87' | Report | | Stadium: Heliodoro Rodríguez López; Referee: Amoedo Chas |

| 21 November 2004 13 | Real Sporting | 2–2 | Ciudad de Murcia | Gijón |
| | Arthuro 84', 90' | Report | Carmena 56' (o.g.); Rivero 86' | Stadium: El Molinón; Referee: Clos Gómez |

| 28 November 2004 14 | Pontevedra | 1–2 | Real Sporting | Pontevedra |
| | Charles 89' | Report | Omar 27'; Irurzun 65' | Stadium: Pasarón; Referee: García Delgado |

| 5 December 2004 15 | Real Sporting | 2–0 | Terrassa | Gijón |
| | Irurzun 14'; Arthuro 82' | Summary | | Stadium: El Molinón; Referee: Orueta Ibarrola |

| 11 December 2004 16 | Xerez | 1–0 | Real Sporting | Jerez de los Caballeros |
| | Roteta 54' | Summary | | Stadium: Chapín; Referee: Herráez Prieto |

| 18 December 2004 17 | Real Sporting | 0–0 | Eibar | Gijón |
| | | Summary | | Stadium: El Molinón; Referee: Caballero Herreros |

| 22 December 2004 18 | Lleida | 0–2 | Real Sporting | Lleida |
| | | Summary | Irurzun 31'; Samuel 44' (yellow card) 0' (yellow-red card) 69' | Stadium: Camp d'Esports; Referee: Rodado Rodríguez |

| 9 January 2005 19 | Real Sporting | 1–0 | Almería | Gijón |
| | Irurzun 39'; Neru (yellow card) 0' (yellow-red card) 75' | Report | | Stadium: El Molinón; Referee: Mateu Lahoz |

| 16 January 2005 20 | Gimnàstic | 1–0 | Real Sporting | Tarragona |
| | Pinilla 77' | Summary | | Stadium: Nou Estadi; Referee: Delgado Ferreiro |

| 23 January 2005 21 | Real Sporting | 1–2 | Deportivo Alavés | Gijón |
| | Irurzun 44' | Summary | Rubén Navarro 13'; De Lucas 71' | Stadium: El Molinón; Referee: Ayza Gámez |

| 15 February 2005 22 | Albacete | 1–0 | Real Sporting | Albacete |
| | Bermejo 31' | Report | Sastre (yellow card) 0' (yellow-red card) 30' | Stadium: Carlos Belmonte; Referee: Hevia Obras |

| 4 February 2005 23 | Real Sporting | 0–1 | Lorca Deportiva | Gijón |
| | | Summary | Ekopki 49' | Stadium: El Molinón; Referee: Gallo Moreno |

| 13 February 2005 24 | Celta | 1–0 | Real Sporting | Vigo |
| | Canobbio 90' | Summary | | Stadium: Balaídos; Referee: Ontanaya López |

| 20 February 2005 25 | Real Sporting | 3–2 | Racing Ferrol | Gijón |
| | Samuel 62', 83'; Biagini 75' | Summary | Carlos 45'; Mario Bermejo 48' | Stadium: El Molinón; Referee: Téllez Sánchez |

| 26 February 2005 26 | Cádiz | 0–0 | Real Sporting | Cádiz |
| | | Summary | | Stadium: Ramón de Carranza; Referee: Pérez Lima |

| 6 March 2005 27 | Real Sporting | 2–0 | Málaga B | Gijón |
| | Dani Borreguero 4'; Calandria 16' | Summary | Rubén Párraga (yellow card) 0' (yellow-red card) 67' | Stadium: El Molinón; Referee: Iglesias Villanueva |

| 13 March 2005 28 | Salamanca | 2–1 | Real Sporting | Villares de la Reina |
| | Robert 25'; Zé Tó 79' | Summary | Pablo Álvarez 65' | Stadium: Helmántico; Referee: Paradas Romero |

| 20 March 2005 29 | Real Sporting | 1–0 | Polideportivo Ejido | Gijón |
| | Pablo Lago 80' | Summary | | Stadium: El Molinón; Referee: Arcas Piqueres |

| 27 March 2005 30 | Córdoba | 0–0 | Real Sporting | Córdoba |
| | | Summary | | Stadium: Nuevo Arcángel; Referee: Delgado Ferreiro |

| 3 April 2005 31 | Real Sporting | 1–1 | Elche | Gijón |
| | Biagini 74'; Marc Bernaus 76' (o.g.); Juan 89' | Summary | Luis Gil 71' | Stadium: El Molinón; Referee: Clos Gómez |

| 10 April 2005 32 | Valladolid | 2–0 | Real Sporting | Valladolid |
| | Óscar Sánchez 14'; Figueredo 18' | Summary | Cristian Díaz (red card) 14' | Stadium: José Zorrilla; Referee: García Delgado |

| 16 April 2005 33 | Real Sporting | 1–1 | Tenerife | Gijón |
| | Juan 12'; Calandria (yellow card) 0' (yellow-red card) 67' | Summary | Cristo Marrero 22' | Stadium: El Molinón; Referee: Ontanaya López |

| 24 April 2005 34 | Ciudad de Murcia | 0–2 | Real Sporting | Murcia |
| | | Summary | Irurzun 76', 86' | Stadium: La Condomina; Referee: Rodado Rodríguez |

| 1 May 2005 35 | Real Sporting | 3–2 | Pontevedra | Gijón |
| | Neru 37'; Irurzun 60'; Arthuro 88' | Summary | Charles 13'; Javi Rodríguez 32' | Stadium: El Molinón; Referee: García Delgado |

| 7 May 2005 36 | Terrassa | 1–0 | Real Sporting | Terrassa |
| | Héctor 51' | Summary | | Stadium: Olímpic; Referee: Amoedo Chas |

| 15 May 2005 37 | Real Sporting | 0–0 | Xerez | Gijón |
| | | Summary | | Stadium: El Molinón; Referee: Martínez Franco |

| 21 May 2005 38 | Eibar | 1–0 | Real Sporting | Eibar |
| | Alberto Suárez (yellow card) 0' (yellow-red card) 63'; Iñigo 87' | Summary | Gerardo (yellow card) 0' (yellow-red card) 27' | Stadium: Ipurua; Referee: Castillo Estévez |

| 28 May 2005 39 | Real Sporting | 1–1 | Lleida | Gijón |
| | Arthuro 82' | Summary | Català 14' | Stadium: El Molinón; Referee: Paradas Romero |

| 5 June 2005 40 | Almería | 1–0 | Real Sporting | Almería |
| | Luna 23'; Adorno (yellow card) 0' (yellow-red card) 82' | Summary | | Stadium: Mediterráneo; Referee: Álvarez Izquierdo |

| 11 June 2005 41 | Real Sporting | 0–3 | Gimnàstic | Gijón |
| | | Summary | Diego Torres 47', 61'; Bolo 72' | Stadium: El Molinón; Referee: Fernández Hinojosa |

| 18 June 2005 42 | Alavés | 0–1 | Real Sporting | Vitoria-Gasteiz |
| | | Summary | Pablo Álvarez 77' | Stadium: Mendizorrotza; Referee: González González |

=== Copa del Rey ===
==== Matches ====
| 27 October 2004 Round of 64 | Real Sporting | 1–2 | Elche | Gijón |
| | Irurzun 59' | Report | Rubén 71'; Moisés 73' | Stadium: El Molinón; Referee: Delgado Ferreiro |

== Squad statistics ==
=== Appearances and goals ===
| No. | Pos | Nat | Player | Total | | Segunda División | | Copa del Rey | |
| No. | Pos | Nat | Player | Apps | Goals | Apps | Goals | Apps | Goals |
|---|---|---|---|---|---|---|---|---|---|
| 1 | GK | (Spain) ESP | Rafa | 4 | 0 | 3+0 | 0 | 1+0 | 0 |
| 2 | DF | (Spain) ESP | Neru | 38 | 1 | 35+2 | 1 | 1+0 | 0 |
| 3 | DF | (Spain) ESP | Chus Bravo | 13 | 0 | 13+0 | 0 | 0+0 | 0 |
| 4 | DF | (Spain) ESP | Isma | 7 | 0 | 6+1 | 0 | 0+0 | 0 |
| 5 | DF | (Spain) ESP | Samuel | 25 | 3 | 18+7 | 3 | 0+0 | 0 |
| 6 | MF | (Spain) ESP | Javi Fuego | 31 | 1 | 22+8 | 1 | 1+0 | 0 |
| 7 | FW | (Argentina) ARG | Leonardo Biagini | 13 | 2 | 1+11 | 2 | 1+0 | 0 |
| 8 | MF | (Spain) ESP | Juan | 38 | 3 | 32+5 | 3 | 1+0 | 0 |
| 9 | FW | (Argentina) ARG | Pablo Calandria | 21 | 2 | 20+1 | 2 | 0+0 | 0 |
| 10 | MF | (Spain) ESP | Carlos Casquero | 4 | 0 | 0+3 | 0 | 1+0 | 0 |
| 11 | MF | (Spain) ESP | David Bauzá | 32 | 0 | 16+15 | 0 | 1+0 | 0 |
| 12 | DF | (Spain) ESP | Diego Alegre | 10 | 0 | 8+1 | 0 | 1+0 | 0 |
| 13 | GK | (Spain) ESP | Roberto | 39 | 0 | 39+0 | 0 | 0+0 | 0 |
| 14 | DF | (Argentina) ARG | Cristian Díaz | 8 | 0 | 8+0 | 0 | 0+0 | 0 |
| 15 | MF | (Spain) ESP | Irurzun | 39 | 14 | 36+2 | 13 | 1+0 | 1 |
| 16 | DF | (Argentina) ARG | Ángel Pérez | 4 | 0 | 2+1 | 0 | 1+0 | 0 |
| 18 | MF | (Spain) ESP | Pablo Álvarez | 36 | 4 | 29+6 | 4 | 0+1 | 0 |
| 19 | FW | (Brazil) BRA | Arthuro | 25 | 6 | 11+14 | 6 | 0+0 | 0 |
| 20 | DF | (Netherlands) NED | Jeffrey | 6 | 0 | 4+1 | 0 | 0+1 | 0 |
| 21 | MF | (Spain) ESP | Pablo Lago | 32 | 2 | 18+13 | 2 | 0+1 | 0 |
| 22 | DF | (Spain) ESP | Rafel Sastre | 36 | 0 | 36+0 | 0 | 0+0 | 0 |
| 23 | MF | (Spain) ESP | Dani Borreguero | 38 | 1 | 32+6 | 1 | 0+0 | 0 |
| 24 | DF | (Spain) ESP | Javier Dorado | 36 | 0 | 35+1 | 0 | 0+0 | 0 |
| 26 | MF | (Spain) ESP | Gerardo | 23 | 0 | 15+8 | 0 | 0+0 | 0 |
| 27 | DF | (Spain) ESP | Alejandro Vázquez | 2 | 0 | 1+0 | 0 | 1+0 | 0 |
| 28 | DF | (Spain) ESP | Ibón Díez | 1 | 0 | 1+0 | 0 | 0+0 | 0 |
| 29 | MF | (Spain) ESP | Chus López | 1 | 0 | 0+1 | 0 | 0+0 | 0 |
| 31 | DF | (Spain) ESP | Miguel Carmena | 22 | 0 | 14+8 | 0 | 0+0 | 0 |
| 32 | FW | (Spain) ESP | Antonio Rojas | 2 | 0 | 0+2 | 0 | 0+0 | 0 |
| 34 | FW | (Spain) ESP | Omar | 13 | 1 | 7+5 | 1 | 1+0 | 0 |
Players who appeared for Sporting de Gijón no longer at the club:
| 7 | FW | (Spain) ESP | David Lago | 2 | 0 | 0+1 | 0 | 1+0 | 0 |
