= 2002–03 Sporting de Gijón season =

Real Sporting
2002–03 season
- Chairman: Manuel Vega-Arango
- Manager: Antonio Maceda
- Stadium: El Molinón
- Segunda División: 10th
- Copa del Rey: Round of 64
- Top goalscorer: David Villa (20)
- Average home league attendance: 12,050

The 2002–03 Sporting de Gijón season was the fifth consecutive season of the club in Segunda División after its last relegation from La Liga.

== Overview ==
On 7 October 2002, Pepe Acebal was sacked as manager, after earning only two points in the first five games. Antonio Maceda replaced him and, despite not winning any game until the round 11, he managed the team until the end of the season.

On 7 March 2003, due to the incidents during the match against Numancia at El Molinón, the Spanish Committee of Sporting Discipline agreed the closure of the stadium for one game. This match, played against Almería, on 7 June 2003 at Antonio Amilivia stadium in León. was the first one of Real Sporting played as home team out of El Molinón.

== Squad ==
Note: Flags indicate national team as defined under FIFA eligibility rules; some limited exceptions apply. Players may hold more than one non-FIFA nationality.

No.	Pos.	Nation	Player
1	GK	ESP	Juanjo
3	DF	ESP	Chus Bravo
4	DF	ESP	Isma
5	MF	ESP	Raúl Lozano
6	MF	ESP	Samuel
7	MF	ESP	Miguel Cobas
8	MF	ESP	Juan
9	FW	ESP	David Villa
10	FW	ESP	Rubén Suárez
11	FW	ESP	José Luis Soto
12	DF	ESP	Diego Alegre
13	GK	ESP	Roberto

No.	Pos.	Nation	Player
14	DF	ARG	Cristian Díaz
15	FW	ESP	Irurzun
16	FW	ESP	Manel
17	DF	SCG	Igor Taševski
18	MF	ESP	Pablo Álvarez
19	DF	ESP	Rubén Pulido
20	FW	ESP	Blin
21	MF	ESP	Abel Segovia
22	DF	ESP	Rafel Sastre
23	MF	ESP	Dani Borreguero
24	MF	ESP	David Bauzá
25	GK	ESP	Juanjo Valencia

=== From the youth squad ===
Note: Flags indicate national team as defined under FIFA eligibility rules; some limited exceptions apply. Players may hold more than one non-FIFA nationality.

No.	Pos.	Nation	Player
27	DF	ESP	Jano
28	MF	ESP	Javi Fuego
29	MF	ESP	Gerardo

== Competitions ==
=== Segunda División ===
==== Results by round ====
Round	1	2	3	4	5	6	7	8	9	10	11	12	13	14	15	16	17	18	19	20	21	22	23	24	25	26	27	28	29	30	31	32	33	34	35	36	37	38	39	40	41	42
Ground	A	H	A	H	H	A	H	A	H	A	H	A	H	A	H	A	H	A	H	A	H	H	A	H	A	A	H	A	H	A	H	A	H	A	H	A	H	A	H	A	H	A
Result	L	D	L	D	D	L	D	D	D	L	W	D	W	W	W	W	D	L	W	D	W	L	D	D	D	W	L	L	D	D	W	D	W	L	L	L	D	D	D	D	D	W
Position	19	17	20	21	20	21	22	22	21	22	20	22	18	17	14	9	10	12	10	10	6	8	10	11	10	9	9	9	10	9	9	8	7	8	8	11	13	13	13	13	14	10

Source: BDFutbol
A = Away; H = Home; W = Win; D = Draw; L = Loss

==== League table ====
Pos	Team	Pld	W	D	L	GF	GA	GD	Pts	Promotion or relegation
8	Tenerife	42	13	18	11	53	39	+14	57	
9	Compostela (R)	42	14	13	15	54	56	−2	55 (Note: Compostela was relegated to Segunda División B because it was unable to cover a share capital expansion. Leganés was readmitted into Segunda División.)	Relegation to Segunda División B
10	Sporting Gijón	42	11	20	11	44	41	+3	53 (Note: GET 0–1 SPG; SPG 0–0 GET)	
11	Getafe	42	13	14	15	52	55	−3	53	
12	Terrassa	42	11	19	12	41	46	−5	52 (Note: TER: 8 pts; EJI: 4 pts; NUM: 3 pts)	

Source: LFP - Liga Adelante
Rules for classification: 1st points; 2nd head-to-head points; 3rd head-to-head goal difference; 4th head-to-head goals scored; 5th goal difference; 6th number of goals scored; 7th Fair-play points
(R) Relegated

==== Matches ====
1 September 2002 1	Numancia	1–0	Real Sporting	Soria
	Carlos Cuéllar 6'; Luis García (red card) 31'	Summary		Stadium: Los Pajaritos; Referee: Tristante Oliva

15 September 2002 2	Real Sporting	0–0	Elche	Gijón
		Summary		Stadium: El Molinón; Referee: Clos Gómez

22 September 2002 3	Xerez	1–0	Real Sporting	Jerez de la Frontera
	Zárate (yellow card) (yellow-red card) 44'; Dani Pendín 79'	Summary		Stadium: Chapín; Referee: Fernández Hinojosa

29 September 2002 4	Real Sporting	0–0	Las Palmas	Gijón
		Summary		Stadium: El Molinón; Referee: García Delgado

28 September 2002 5	Real Sporting	1–1	Leganés	Gijón
	Manel 29'	Report	Villa 35'	Stadium: El Molinón; Referee: Fernández Borbalán

13 October 2002 6	Albacete	4–0	Real Sporting	Albacete
	Munteanu 30'; Perera 70'; Parri 72'; Duré 83'	Summary	Sastre (yellow card) (yellow-red card) 63'	Stadium: Carlos Belmonte; Referee: Herráez Prieto

20 October 2002 7	Real Sporting	1–1	Polideportivo Ejido	Gijón
	Soto 82'	Summary	Sierra 90'	Stadium: El Molinón; Referee: Lizondo Cortés

27 October 2002 8	Salamanca	0–0	Real Sporting	Villares de la Reina
		Summary		Stadium: Helmántico; Referee: Pérez Izquierdo

3 November 2002 9	Real Sporting	0–0	Córdoba	Gijón
	Juan (yellow card) (yellow-red card) 87'	Report		Stadium: El Molinón; Referee: Fernández Hinojosa

10 November 2002 10	Levante	2–1	Real Sporting	Valencia
	Jofre 31'; Limones 87'	Report	Cristian Díaz 51'	Stadium: Ciutat de València; Referee: Paradas Romero

17 November 2002 11	Real Sporting	1–0	Murcia	Gijón
	Villa 86'	Summary	Clavero (yellow card) (yellow-red card) 85'	Stadium: El Molinón; Referee: Bello Rebolo

24 November 2002 12	Tenerife	2–2	Real Sporting	Santa Cruz de Tenerife
	Martí 27'; Paunović 61'	Report	Villa 53', 86'	Stadium: Heliodoro Rodríguez López; Referee: Amoedo Chas

30 November 2002 13	Real Sporting	3–1	Racing Ferrol	Gijón
	Villa 42', 59', 85'	Report	Cuéllar 51'	Stadium: El Molinón; Referee: Delgado Ferreiro

8 December 2002 14	Compostela	2–3	Real Sporting	Santiago de Compostela
	Aguado 27'; Adriano 90'	Report	Villa 1', 12'; Rubén 86'	Stadium: San Lázaro; Referee: Velasco Carballo

15 December 2002 15	Real Sporting	1–0	Oviedo	Gijón
	Lozano 14'; Cobas (red card) 59'	Summary		Stadium: El Molinón; Referee: Pérez Lima

22 December 2002 16	Getafe	0–1	Real Sporting	Getafe
		Summary	Juan 6'	Stadium: Coliseum; Referee: Clos Gómez

4 January 2002 17	Real Sporting	1–1	Zaragoza	Gijón
	Villa 73'	Summary	Juanele 52'; David Pirri (yellow card) (yellow-red card) 72'	Stadium: El Molinón; Referee: Arcas Piqueres

11 January 2003 18	Almería	1–0	Real Sporting	Almería
	Francisco 39'	Summary		Stadium: Juan Rojas; Referee: Rodado Rodríguez

19 January 2003 19	Real Sporting	1–0	Eibar	Gijón
	Cristian Díaz 48'	Report	Xabi Sánchez (yellow card) (yellow-red card) 87'	Stadium: El Molinón; Referee: Martínez Franco

26 January 2003 20	Terrassa	0–0	Real Sporting	Terrassa
		Summary		Stadium: Olímpic; Referee: Mensuro Miguel

26 January 2003 21	Real Sporting	4–0	Badajoz	Gijón
	Lozano 13'; Cristian Díaz 28'; Pulido 58'; Pablo Álvarez 60'	Summary		Stadium: El Molinón; Referee: Herráez Prieto

9 February 2003 22	Real Sporting	1–2	Numancia	Gijón
	Villa 35'	Summary	Fagiani 19'; Aranda 45'; Kome (red card) 77'; Ojeda (red card) 86'	Stadium: El Molinón; Referee: Velasco Carballo

16 February 2003 23	Elche	1–1	Real Sporting	Elche
	Armentano 90'	Summary	Manel 33'	Stadium: Manuel Martínez Valero; Referee: Castillo Estévez

8 February 2003 24	Real Sporting	1–1	Xerez	Gijón
	Taševski 67'	Summary	Mena 59'	Stadium: El Molinón; Referee: Valle Gil

2 March 2003 25	Las Palmas	2–2	Real Sporting	Las Palmas
	Reggi 25', 58'	Summary	Lozano 45'; Pulido 81'	Stadium: Insular; Referee: Bello Rebolo

9 March 2003 26	Leganés	0–2	Real Sporting	Leganés
	Fede Bahón (yellow card) (yellow-red card) 65'; Óscar (yellow card) (yellow-red card) 79'	Summary	Manel 52'; Villa 77'	Stadium: Butarque; Referee: Lizondo Cortés

16 March 2003 27	Real Sporting	0–1	Albacete	Gijón
		Summary	Mikel 73'; Paco Peña (red card) 83'	Stadium: El Molinón; Referee: Tristante Oliva

22 March 2003 28	Polideportivo Ejido	1–0	Real Sporting	El Ejido
	David Prats 40'	Summary	Taševski (yellow card) (yellow-red card) 86'	Stadium: Santo Domingo; Referee: Velasco Carballo

30 March 2003 29	Real Sporting	1–1	Salamanca	Gijón
	Rubén 46'; Juan (yellow card) (yellow-red card) 85'	Summary	Quique Martín 40'	Stadium: El Molinón; Referee: Paradas Romero

6 April 2003 30	Córdoba	1–1	Real Sporting	Córdoba
	Șerban 28'; Soria (red card) 53'	Summary	Villa 54'	Stadium: Nuevo Arcángel; Referee: Ayza Gámez

13 April 2003 31	Real Sporting	3–2	Levante	Gijón
	Lozano 11'; Pablo Álvarez 61'; Villa 86'	Summary	Congo 72', 84'	Stadium: El Molinón; Referee: Amoedo Chas

20 April 2003 32	Murcia	0–0	Real Sporting	Murcia
		Summary		Stadium: La Condomina; Referee: Rubio Iniesta

26 April 2003 33	Real Sporting	2–1	Tenerife	Gijón
	Villa 28', 49'	Summary	Paunović 51'	Stadium: El Molinón; Referee: Mensuro Miguel

4 May 2003 34	Racing Ferrol	2–1	Real Sporting	Ferrol
	Juan 22' (o.g.); Ramis 68'	Summary	Villa 15'	Stadium: A Malata; Referee: Clos Gómez

10 May 2003 35	Real Sporting	1–3	Compostela	Gijón
	Dani Borreguero 28'	Summary	Corredoira 37'; Maikel 62'; Sequeiros 86'	Stadium: El Molinón; Referee: Martínez Franco

18 May 2003 36	Oviedo	2–1	Real Sporting	Oviedo
	Geni 29'; Oli 56'	Summary	Villa 32'; Pablo Álvarez (red card) 73'	Stadium: Carlos Tartiere; Referee: Delgado Ferreiro

25 May 2003 37	Real Sporting	0–0	Getafe	Gijón
	Rubén (yellow card) (yellow-red card) 89'	Summary		Stadium: El Molinón; Referee: Román González

31 May 2003 38	Zaragoza	1–1	Real Sporting	Zaragoza
	Espadas 2'	Summary	Villa 69'	Stadium: La Romareda; Referee: Teixeira Vitienes

7 June 2003 39	Real Sporting	2–2	Almería	León
	Villa 9', 51'	Summary	Olivares 25'; Bilić 85'	Stadium: Antonio Amilivia; Referee: Herráez Prieto

14 June 2003 41	Eibar	1–1	Real Sporting	Eibar
	Eneko Romo 90'	Summary	Dani Borreguero 55'	Stadium: Ipurua; Referee: Pérez Lima

21 June 2003 41	Real Sporting	0–0	Terrassa	Gijón
		Summary		Stadium: El Molinón; Referee: Castillo Estévez

28 June 2003 42	Badajoz	0–3	Real Sporting	Badajoz
		Summary	Pulido 42', 51'; Irurzun 90'	Stadium: Nuevo Vivero; Referee: Tristante Oliva

=== Copa del Rey ===
==== Matches ====
11 September 2002 Round of 64	Real Sporting	1–2	Valladolid	Gijón
	Villa 72'	Report	Aganzo 35'; Peña (red card) 65'; Sousa 81'	Stadium: El Molinón; Referee: Esquinas Torres

== Squad statistics ==
=== Appearances and goals ===
No.	Pos	Nat	Player	Total		Segunda División		Copa del Rey	
No.	Pos	Nat	Player	Apps	Goals	Apps	Goals	Apps	Goals
1	GK	(Spain) ESP	Juanjo	4	0	4+0	0	0+0	0
3	DF	(Spain) ESP	Chus Bravo	25	0	20+4	0	1+0	0
4	DF	(Spain) ESP	Isma	0	0	0+0	0	0+0	0
5	MF	(Spain) ESP	Raúl Lozano	32	4	24+8	4	0+0	0
6	DF	(Spain) ESP	Samuel	6	0	1+5	0	0+0	0
7	MF	(Spain) ESP	Miguel Cobas	30	0	22+7	0	0+1	0
8	MF	(Spain) ESP	Juan	38	1	34+3	1	1+0	0
9	FW	(Spain) ESP	David Villa	40	21	35+4	20	1+0	1
10	FW	(Spain) ESP	Rubén Suárez	27	2	8+18	2	1+0	0
11	FW	(Spain) ESP	José Luis Soto	22	1	4+17	1	0+1	0
12	DF	(Spain) ESP	Diego Alegre	27	0	22+5	0	0+0	0
13	GK	(Spain) ESP	Roberto	1	0	1+0	0	0+0	0
14	DF	(Argentina) ARG	Cristian Díaz	37	3	36+0	3	1+0	0
15	MF	(Spain) ESP	Irurzun	18	1	12+6	1	0+0	0
16	FW	(Spain) ESP	Manel	34	3	18+15	3	1+0	0
17	DF	(Serbia and Montenegro) SCG	Igor Taševski	40	1	39+0	1	1+0	0
18	MF	(Spain) ESP	Pablo Álvarez	26	2	20+5	2	1+0	0
19	DF	(Spain) ESP	Rubén Pulido	22	4	21+1	4	0+0	0
20	DF	(Spain) ESP	Blin	1	0	0+1	0	0+0	0
21	MF	(Spain) ESP	Abel Segovia	16	0	11+5	0	0+0	0
22	DF	(Spain) ESP	Rafel Sastre	38	0	37+0	0	1+0	0
23	MF	(Spain) ESP	Dani Borreguero	37	2	36+0	2	1+0	0
24	MF	(Spain) ESP	David Bauzá	16	0	13+3	0	0+0	0
25	GK	(Spain) ESP	Juanjo Valencia	38	0	37+0	0	1+0	0
27	DF	(Spain) ESP	Jano	6	0	3+3	0	0+0	0
28	MF	(Spain) ESP	Javi Fuego	3	0	3+0	0	0+0	0
29	MF	(Spain) ESP	Gerardo	1	0	0+1	0	0+0	0
Players who appeared for Sporting de Gijón no longer at the club:
3	DF	(Spain) ESP	Pablo Amo	1	0	1+0	0	0+0	0
