= 2001–02 Sporting de Gijón season =

Real Sporting
2001–02 season
- Chairman: Juan Manuel Pérez Arango
- Manager: Pepe Acebal
- Stadium: El Molinón
- Segunda División: 6th
- Copa del Rey: Round of 16
- Top goalscorer: David Villa (18)
- Average home league attendance: 11,586

The 2001–02 Sporting de Gijón season was the fourth consecutive season of the club in Segunda División after its last relegation from La Liga.

== Overview ==
After finishing the previous season, Pepe Acebal continued at the helm of the club. Real Sporting finished the season in the sixth position and was eliminated in the round of 16 by Villarreal of the Copa del Rey after beating previously Oviedo, in the first Asturian derby played in four years, and La Liga team Deportivo Alavés.

== Squad ==
Note: Flags indicate national team as defined under FIFA eligibility rules; some limited exceptions apply. Players may hold more than one non-FIFA nationality.

| No. | Pos. | Nation | Player |
|---|---|---|---|
| 1 | GK | ESP | Juanjo |
| 2 | DF | ESP | Pablo Amo |
| 3 | DF | ESP | Borja |
| 4 | DF | ESP | Isma |
| 5 | MF | ESP | Raúl Lozano |
| 6 | FW | ESP | José Luis Soto |
| 7 | MF | ESP | Miguel Cobas |
| 8 | MF | ESP | Juan |
| 9 | FW | ESP | Míchel |
| 10 | MF | RUS | Igor Lediakhov |
| 11 | FW | ESP | Alberto |
| 12 | DF | ESP | Blin |

| No. | Pos. | Nation | Player |
|---|---|---|---|
| 14 | MF | ESP | David Pirri |
| 15 | DF | ESP | José Manuel Aira |
| 16 | FW | ESP | David Villa |
| 17 | FW | ESP | Rubén Suárez |
| 18 | MF | ESP | Pablo Álvarez |
| 19 | FW | ESP | Miguel |
| 20 | DF | ESP | Chus Bravo |
| 21 | MF | ESP | Samuel |
| 22 | DF | ESP | Rafel Sastre |
| 23 | MF | ESP | Dani Borreguero |
| 24 | MF | ESP | Javier Dorado |
| 25 | GK | ESP | Juanjo Valencia |

=== From the youth squad ===
Note: Flags indicate national team as defined under FIFA eligibility rules; some limited exceptions apply. Players may hold more than one non-FIFA nationality.

| No. | Pos. | Nation | Player |
|---|---|---|---|
| 28 | DF | ESP | Jano |
| 28 | DF | ESP | Migue |
| 30 | GK | ESP | Daniel Lastra |

| No. | Pos. | Nation | Player |
|---|---|---|---|
| 31 | MF | ESP | Gerardo |
| 32 | MF | ESP | Javi Fuego |

== Competitions ==
=== La Liga ===
==== Results by round ====
| Round | 1 | 2 | 3 | 4 | 5 | 6 | 7 | 8 | 9 | 10 | 11 | 12 | 13 | 14 | 15 | 16 | 17 | 18 | 19 | 20 | 21 | 22 | 23 | 24 | 25 | 26 | 27 | 28 | 29 | 30 | 31 | 32 | 33 | 34 | 35 | 36 | 37 | 38 | 39 | 40 | 41 | 42 |
|---|---|---|---|---|---|---|---|---|---|---|---|---|---|---|---|---|---|---|---|---|---|---|---|---|---|---|---|---|---|---|---|---|---|---|---|---|---|---|---|---|---|---|
| Ground | A | H | A | H | A | H | A | H | A | H | A | H | A | H | A | H | A | H | A | H | A | H | A | H | A | H | A | H | A | H | A | H | A | H | A | H | A | H | A | H | A | H |
| Result | L | W | L | D | W | L | L | W | D | D | W | D | L | L | D | W | W | D | L | D | D | L | W | W | W | W | L | L | W | D | D | D | W | D | D | W | L | W | W | L | W | W |
| Position | 20 | 6 | 14 | 14 | 10 | 11 | 16 | 13 | 13 | 14 | 11 | 11 | 13 | 15 | 17 | 14 | 12 | 12 | 13 | 13 | 13 | 15 | 12 | 11 | 7 | 6 | 8 | 10 | 7 | 9 | 8 | 10 | 6 | 8 | 8 | 7 | 7 | 7 | 6 | 6 | 6 | 6 |

Source: BDFutbol
A = Away; H = Home; W = Win; D = Draw; L = Loss

==== League table ====
| Pos | Team | Pld | W | D | L | GF | GA | GD | Pts |
|---|---|---|---|---|---|---|---|---|---|
| 4 | Xerez | 42 | 19 | 9 | 14 | 43 | 42 | +1 | 66 |
| 5 | Elche | 42 | 17 | 14 | 11 | 52 | 39 | +13 | 65 |
| 6 | Sporting Gijón | 42 | 17 | 13 | 12 | 57 | 47 | +10 | 64 |
| 7 | Oviedo | 42 | 13 | 19 | 10 | 41 | 40 | +1 | 58 (Note: OVI 1–0 EIB; EIB 1–1 OVI) |
| 8 | Eibar | 42 | 14 | 16 | 12 | 41 | 27 | +14 | 58 |

Source: LFP - Liga Adelante
Rules for classification: 1st points; 2nd head-to-head points; 3rd head-to-head goal difference; 4th head-to-head goals scored; 5th goal difference; 6th number of goals scored; 7th Fair-play points

==== Matches ====
| 26 August 2001 1 | Xerez | 1–0 | Real Sporting | Jerez de la Frontera |
| | Mendoza 49' | Summary | | Stadium: Chapín; Referee: Segura García |

| 2 September 2001 2 | Real Sporting | 3–0 | Badajoz | Gijón |
| | Juan 55', 66'; Isma 89' | Summary | | Stadium: El Molinón; Referee: Teixeira Vitienes |

| 9 September 2001 3 | Numancia | 3–1 | Real Sporting | Soria |
| | Pacheta 15', 87'; Ojeda 57' | Summary | Pablo Álvarez 49' | Stadium: Los Pajaritos; Referee: Fernández Hinojosa |

| 16 September 2001 4 | Real Sporting | 0–0 | Albacete | Gijón |
| | | Summary | Corona (yellow card) (yellow-red card) 67' | Stadium: El Molinón; Referee: Bello Rebolo |

| 23 September 2001 7 | Córdoba | 1–2 | Real Sporting | Córdoba |
| | Manolo 32' | Summary | Pablo Álvarez 18'; Míchuel 28' | Stadium: Nuevo Arcángel; Referee: Velasco Carballo |

| 29 September 2001 6 | Real Sporting | 0–1 | Elche | Gijón |
| | Aira (red card) 84' | Report | Nino 50' | Stadium: El Molinón; Referee: Paradas Romero |

| 3 October 2001 7 | Murcia | 3–1 | Real Sporting | Murcia |
| | Ismael 29'; Largo 71'; Godino 89' | Summary | David Pirri 64' | Stadium: La Condomina; Referee: Román González |

| 20 October 2001 8 | Real Sporting | 2–1 | Atlético Madrid | Gijón |
| | Lozano 46'; Lediakhov 89' | Summary | Correa 16' | Stadium: El Molinón; Referee: Rodado Rodríguez |

| 14 October 2001 9 | Polideportivo Ejido | 2–2 | Real Sporting | El Ejido |
| | Arpón 46'; Juan Jesús 53' | Report | Aira 23'; Lozano 55' | Stadium: Santo Domingo; Referee: Ayza Gámez |

| 21 October 2001 10 | Real Sporting | 1–1 | Gimnàstic | Gijón |
| | Villa 19' | Report | Manolo Herrero 85' | Stadium: El Molinón; Referee: Rubio Iniesta |

| 28 October 2001 11 | Oviedo | 0–2 | Real Sporting | Oviedo |
| | Geni (penalty missed) 39'; Onopko (yellow card) (yellow-red card) 44' | Report | Lozano 7'; Dorado (red card) 38'; Villa 60'; Juan (yellow card) (yellow-red card) 88' | Stadium: Carlos Tartiere; Referee: Arcas Piqueres |

| 3 November 2001 12 | Real Sporting | 1–1 | Extremadura | Gijón |
| | Villa 24' | Summary | Moreno 34' | Stadium: El Molinón; Referee: Rebollo Soto |

| 7 November 2001 13 | Racing Santander | 2–1 | Real Sporting | Santander |
| | Juanma 11'; Regueiro (yellow card) (yellow-red card) 37'; Bodipo 62' | Report | Alberto 86' | Stadium: El Sardinero; Referee: Rubinos Pérez |

| 10 November 2001 14 | Real Sporting | 0–1 | Burgos | Gijón |
| | | Report | Gálvez 82' | Stadium: El Molinón; Referee: Valle Gil |

| 17 November 2001 15 | Jaén | 3–3 | Real Sporting | Jaén |
| | Pepelu 16', 50'; Goran Milošević 39' | Summary | David Pirri 53'; Soto 74'; Míchel 82'; Alberto (yellow card) (yellow-red card) 85' | Stadium: La Victoria; Referee: Martínez Terrén |

| 25 November 2001 16 | Real Sporting | 1–0 | Eibar | Gijón |
| | Míchel 19' | Summary | | Stadium: El Molinón; Referee: Lizondo Cortés |

| 2 December 2001 17 | Racing Ferrol | 1–2 | Real Sporting | Ferrol |
| | Emery 35' | Summary | Lozano 4', 26' | Stadium: A Malata; Referee: Jávega Jiménez |

| 9 December 2001 18 | Real Sporting | 1–1 | Leganés | Gijón |
| | Valencia (red card) 5'; Dani Borreguero 32'; Lozano (red card) 77' | Summary | Gámiz 8' | Stadium: El Molinón; Referee: García Delgado |

| 15 December 2001 19 | Levante | 4–3 | Real Sporting | Valencia |
| | Ettien (red card) 30'; Kaiku 49'; Fúriga 59'; Alberto Saavedra 85'; Josemi 89' | Report | Villa 2'; Lozano 27'; Pablo Amo 65' | Stadium: Ciutat de València; Referee: Rodado Rodríguez |

| 23 December 2001 20 | Real Sporting | 1–1 | Salamanca | Gijón |
| | Dani Borreguero 38' | Report | Robert 47' | Stadium: El Molinón; Referee: Moreno Delgado |

| 6 January 2002 21 | Recreativo | 0–0 | Real Sporting | Huelva |
| | | Summary | Juan (yellow card) (yellow-red card) 55' | Stadium: Nuevo Colombino; Referee: Teixeira Vitienes |

| 9 February 2002 22 | Real Sporting | 0–1 | Xerez | Gijón |
| | David Pirri (red card) 61' | Summary | Pineda 76' | Stadium: El Molinón; Referee: Clos Gómez |

| 20 January 2002 23 | Badajoz | 1–2 | Real Sporting | Badajoz |
| | Jornet 22' | Summary | Villa 40', 49' | Stadium: Nuevo Vivero; Referee: Pérez Lima |

| 27 January 2002 24 | Real Sporting | 2–1 | Numancia | Gijón |
| | Villa 16', 30' | Summary | Ojeda 89' | Stadium: El Molinón; Referee: Valle Gil |

| 3 February 2002 25 | Albacete | 1–2 | Real Sporting | Albacete |
| | Simeón 23' | Summary | Villa 30', 75'; Sastre (yellow card) (yellow-red card) 59' | Stadium: Carlos Belmonte; Referee: Fernández Borbalán |

| 6 February 2002 26 | Real Sporting | 3–0 | Córdoba | Gijón |
| | Villa 23'; Míchel 25'; Pablo Álvarez 89' | Summary | | Stadium: El Molinón; Referee: Tristante Oliva |

| 10 February 2002 27 | Elche | 1–0 | Real Sporting | Elche |
| | Meca 85' | Summary | | Stadium: Manuel Martínez Valero; Referee: Segura García |

| 17 February 2002 28 | Real Sporting | 0–1 | Murcia | Gijón |
| | | Summary | Loreto 23' | Stadium: El Molinón; Referee: Pérez Izquierdo |

| 24 February 2002 29 | Atlético Madrid | 0–1 | Real Sporting | Madrid |
| | Hibić (yellow card) (yellow-red card) 86' | Summary | David Pirri 86' | Stadium: Vicente Calderón; Referee: Rebollo Soto |

| 3 March 2002 30 | Real Sporting | 1–1 | Polideportivo Ejido | Gijón |
| | Villa 40' | Summary | Changui 27' | Stadium: El Molinón; Referee: Bello Rebolo |

| 10 March 2002 31 | Gimnàstic | 1–1 | Real Sporting | Tarragona |
| | Cuéllar 13' | Summary | David Pirri 2' | Stadium: Nou Estadi; Referee: Fernández Hinojosa |

| 17 March 2002 32 | Real Sporting | 0–0 | Oviedo | Gijón |
| | Juan (red card) 77' | Summary | | Stadium: El Molinón; Referee: Rodado Rodríguez |

| 24 March 2002 33 | Extremadura | 1–2 | Real Sporting | Almendralejo |
| | Jesús Vázquez 12' | Summary | Soto 11'; Villa 29' | Stadium: Francisco de la Hera; Referee: Velasco Carballo |

| 31 March 2002 34 | Real Sporting | 1–1 | Racing Santander | Gijón |
| | Soto 75'; Lozano (yellow card) (yellow-red card) 89' | Summary | Txiki 9' | Stadium: El Molinón; Referee: Ayza Gámez |

| 7 April 2002 35 | Burgos | 0–0 | Real Sporting | Burgos |
| | | Summary | | Stadium: El Plantío; Referee: Paradas Romero |

| 14 April 2002 36 | Real Sporting | 3–2 | Jaén | Gijón |
| | Curro Montoya 14' (o.g.); Dani Borreguero 42'; Soto 59' | Summary | Rueda 22'; Biscayzacú 84' | Stadium: El Molinón; Referee: Jávega Jiménez |

| 21 April 2002 37 | Eibar | 2–0 | Real Sporting | Eibar |
| | Garitano 10'; Jorge Sánchez 60' | Summary | | Stadium: Ipurua; Referee: García Delgado |

| 28 April 2002 38 | Real Sporting | 5–3 | Racing Ferrol | Gijón |
| | Villa 9'; Jacob 29' (o.g.); Soto 43'; Cobas (red card) 44'; Dorado 47'; Isma 70' | Summary | Diawara 23'; Grozdić 53'; Redondo 63' | Stadium: El Molinón; Referee: Pérez Lima |

| 4 May 2002 39 | Leganés | 0–2 | Real Sporting | Leganés |
| | | Summary | Chus Bravo 10'; Míchel 90' | Stadium: Butarque; Referee: Román González |

| 11 May 2002 40 | Real Sporting | 0–1 | Levante | Gijón |
| | | Summary | Roa 26'; Juanra (red card) 52'; Tabaré (red card) 73' | Stadium: El Molinón; Referee: Fernández Hinojosa |

| 19 May 2002 41 | Salamanca | 1–2 | Real Sporting | Villares de la Reina |
| | Robert 47' | Summary | Villa 3', 28' | Stadium: El Helmántico; Referee: Tristante Oliva |

| 25 May 2002 42 | Real Sporting | 3–1 | Recreativo | Gijón |
| | Villa 70', 90'; Soto 82' | Summary | Epitié 88' | Stadium: El Molinón; Referee: Teixeira Vitienes |

=== Copa del Rey ===
==== Matches ====
| 10 October 2001 Round of 64 | Real Sporting | 4–2 | Oviedo | Gijón |
| | Pablo Amo 1'; David Pirri 16'; Villa 42', 76' | Report | Óscar Álvarez 4'; Geni 91' | Stadium: El Molinón; Referee: Pérez Izquierdo |

| 28 November 2001 Round of 32 | Real Sporting | 2–0 | Alavés | Gijón |
| | Soto 61', 75' | Report | | Stadium: El Molinón; Referee: González Vázquez |

| 12 December 2001 Round of 16; First leg | Real Sporting | 2–4 | Villarreal | Gijón |
| | Juanjo (red card) 12'; Pablo Álvarez 28', 90' | Report | Craioveanu 45'; Jorge López 61', 76'; Quique Martín 72' | Stadium: El Molinón; Referee: Pérez Burrull |

| 19 December 2001 Round of 16; Second leg | Villarreal | 3–1 (7–3 agg.) | Real Sporting | Villarreal |
| | Cagna 25'; Quique Martín 79', 85' | Report | Soto 15'; Isma (red card) | Stadium: El Madrigal; Referee: Téllez Sánchez |

== Squad statistics ==
=== Appearances and goals ===
| No. | Pos | Nat | Player | Total | | Segunda División | | Copa del Rey | |
| No. | Pos | Nat | Player | Apps | Goals | Apps | Goals | Apps | Goals |
|---|---|---|---|---|---|---|---|---|---|
| 1 | GK | (Spain) ESP | Juanjo | 13 | 0 | 9+1 | 0 | 3+0 | 0 |
| 2 | DF | (Spain) ESP | Pablo Amo | 41 | 2 | 37+0 | 1 | 3+1 | 1 |
| 3 | DF | (Spain) ESP | Borja | 6 | 0 | 5+0 | 0 | 1+0 | 0 |
| 4 | DF | (Spain) ESP | Isma | 27 | 2 | 24+1 | 2 | 2+0 | 0 |
| 5 | MF | (Spain) ESP | Raúl Lozano | 41 | 6 | 30+8 | 6 | 2+1 | 0 |
| 6 | FW | (Spain) ESP | José Luis Soto | 35 | 9 | 13+18 | 6 | 3+1 | 3 |
| 7 | MF | (Spain) ESP | Miguel Cobas | 20 | 0 | 7+11 | 0 | 2+0 | 0 |
| 8 | MF | (Spain) ESP | Juan | 38 | 2 | 36+0 | 2 | 2+0 | 0 |
| 9 | FW | (Spain) ESP | Míchel | 34 | 5 | 16+17 | 5 | 1+0 | 0 |
| 10 | MF | (Russia) RUS | Igor Lediakhov | 20 | 1 | 5+13 | 1 | 1+1 | 0 |
| 11 | FW | (Spain) ESP | Alberto | 25 | 1 | 11+12 | 1 | 2+0 | 0 |
| 12 | DF | (Spain) ESP | Blin | 0 | 0 | 0+0 | 0 | 0+0 | 0 |
| 14 | MF | (Spain) ESP | David Pirri | 35 | 5 | 32+0 | 4 | 3+0 | 1 |
| 15 | DF | (Spain) ESP | José Manuel Aira | 25 | 1 | 21+1 | 1 | 3+0 | 0 |
| 16 | FW | (Spain) ESP | David Villa | 44 | 20 | 36+4 | 18 | 2+2 | 2 |
| 17 | FW | (Spain) ESP | Rubén Suárez | 0 | 0 | 0+0 | 0 | 0+0 | 0 |
| 18 | MF | (Spain) ESP | Pablo Álvarez | 39 | 5 | 29+6 | 3 | 3+1 | 2 |
| 19 | DF | (Spain) ESP | Miguel | 2 | 0 | 0+2 | 0 | 0+0 | 0 |
| 20 | DF | (Spain) ESP | Chus Bravo | 21 | 1 | 9+10 | 1 | 0+2 | 0 |
| 21 | DF | (Spain) ESP | Samuel | 9 | 0 | 8+0 | 0 | 1+0 | 0 |
| 22 | DF | (Spain) ESP | Rafel Sastre | 41 | 0 | 38+0 | 0 | 3+0 | 0 |
| 23 | MF | (Spain) ESP | Dani Borreguero | 37 | 3 | 29+5 | 3 | 3+0 | 0 |
| 24 | DF | (Spain) ESP | Javier Dorado | 38 | 1 | 34+0 | 1 | 3+1 | 0 |
| 25 | GK | (Spain) ESP | Juanjo Valencia | 34 | 0 | 33+0 | 0 | 1+0 | 0 |
| 28 | DF | (Spain) ESP | Jano | 1 | 0 | 0+1 | 0 | 0+0 | 0 |
| 29 | DF | (Spain) ESP | Migue | 1 | 0 | 0+0 | 0 | 0+1 | 0 |
| 30 | GK | (Spain) ESP | Daniel Lastra | 2 | 0 | 0+1 | 0 | 0+1 | 0 |
| 31 | MF | (Spain) ESP | Gerardo | 1 | 0 | 0+1 | 0 | 0+0 | 0 |
| 32 | MF | (Spain) ESP | Javi Fuego | 1 | 0 | 0+1 | 0 | 0+0 | 0 |
