= 2005–06 Sporting de Gijón season =

Real Sporting
2005–06 season
- Chairman: Manuel Vega-Arango
- Manager: Ciriaco Cano
- Stadium: El Molinón
- Segunda División: 9th
- Copa del Rey: Second round
- Top goalscorer: Pablo Calandria (12)
- Average home league attendance: 9,198

The 2005–06 Sporting de Gijón season was the eighth consecutive season of the club in Segunda División after its last relegation from La Liga.

== Overview ==
Real Sporting finished the season in the ninth position, repeating the performance of the previous season in League and Cup.

On 7 January 2006, the match against Racing de Ferrol, played in A Malata, became the first broadcasting ever of Radio Televisión del Principado de Asturias, the new regional public television of Asturias.

== Squad ==
Note: Flags indicate national team as defined under FIFA eligibility rules; some limited exceptions apply. Players may hold more than one non-FIFA nationality.

No.	Pos.	Nation	Player
2	DF	ESP	Blin
3	DF	ESP	Chus Bravo
4	DF	ESP	Miguel Carmena
5	DF	ESP	Carlos Casquero
6	MF	ESP	Javi Fuego
7	FW	ESP	David Karanka
8	MF	ESP	Juan
9	FW	ARG	Pablo Calandria
10	FW	ARG	Leonardo Biagini
11	MF	ESP	Pablo Lago

No.	Pos.	Nation	Player
12	MF	ESP	Joaquín Enguix
13	GK	ESP	Roberto
14	DF	NED	Jeffrey
17	MF	ESP	Álvaro Varela
18	MF	ESP	Pablo Álvarez
20	MF	ESP	Gerardo Noriega
21	DF	ESP	Juanmi
22	DF	ESP	Rafel Sastre (captain)
24	DF	ESP	Javier Dorado

=== From the youth squad ===
Note: Flags indicate national team as defined under FIFA eligibility rules; some limited exceptions apply. Players may hold more than one non-FIFA nationality.

No.	Pos.	Nation	Player
26	MF	ESP	Míchel
27	DF	ESP	Raúl Cámara
28	DF	ESP	Manuel Lucena
29	MF	ESP	Pedro
30	GK	ESP	Alejandro
32	MF	ESP	Pablo de Lucas
34	GK	ESP	Manu

No.	Pos.	Nation	Player
35	DF	ESP	Moisés
36	DF	ESP	Jorge
37	DF	ESP	Noel Alonso
39	DF	ESP	José Ángel
40	MF	ESP	Marcos Landeira
41	DF	ESP	Iván Guardado

== Competitions ==
=== Segunda División ===
==== Results by round ====
Round	1	2	3	4	5	6	7	8	9	10	11	12	13	14	15	16	17	18	19	20	21	22	23	24	25	26	27	28	29	30	31	32	33	34	35	36	37	38	39	40	41	42
Ground	H	A	H	A	H	A	H	A	H	A	H	A	A	H	A	H	A	H	A	H	A	A	H	A	H	A	H	A	H	A	H	A	H	H	A	H	A	H	A	H	A	H
Result	W	W	D	L	D	L	W	L	D	L	D	W	W	D	W	W	D	D	D	D	L	L	L	D	D	D	W	L	W	D	D	L	D	W	W	D	L	L	L	W	D	W
Position	4	1	3	5	6	11	6	10	11	13	14	10	9	10	8	6	6	5	6	6	8	10	13	13	12	13	12	13	11	11	11	12	13	10	10	10	11	11	15	10	11	9

Source: BDFutbol
A = Away; H = Home; W = Win; D = Draw; L = Loss

==== League table ====
Pos	Team	Pld	W	D	L	GF	GA	GD	Pts
7	Xerez	42	18	13	11	60	46	+14	67 (Note: ALM 3–0 XER; XER 0–0 ALM)
8	Numancia	42	18	9	15	50	55	−5	63
9	Sporting Gijón	42	13	17	12	41	34	+7	56
10	Valladolid	42	14	13	15	54	54	0	55 (Note: RMC 2–3 VLD; VLD 1–0 RMC)
11	Real Madrid Castilla	42	16	7	19	55	50	+5	55

Source: BDFutbol
Rules for classification: 1st points; 2nd head-to-head points; 3rd head-to-head goal difference; 4th head-to-head goals scored; 5th goal difference; 6th number of goals scored; 7th Fair-play points

==== Matches ====
27 August 2005 1	Real Sporting	2–0	Albacete	Gijón
	Pablo Álvarez 9', 25'	Summary		Stadium: El Molinón; Referee: J.A. Teixeira Vitienes

4 September 2005 2	Gimnàstic	0–4	Real Sporting	Tarragona
		Summary	Pablo Álvarez 1'; Míchel 4'; Calandria 78'; Dorado 89'	Stadium: Nou Estadi; Referee: Martínez Franco

11 September 2005 3	Real Sporting	1–1	Recreativo	Gijón
	Gerardo 20'	Summary	Calle 46'	Stadium: El Molinón; Referee: González González

17 September 2005 4	Málaga B	1–0	Real Sporting	Málaga
	Usero 63'	Summary		Stadium: La Rosaleda; Referee: Caballero Herreros

25 September 2005 5	Real Sporting	1–1	Real Madrid Castilla	Gijón
	Biagini 87'	Report	Borja Valero 82'	Stadium: El Molinón; Referee: Mateu Lahoz

2 October 2005 6	Almería	3–0	Real Sporting	Almería
	Varela 36'; Francisco 56'; Míchel 68'	Summary		Stadium: Mediterráneo; Referee: Hevia Obras

9 October 2005 7	Real Sporting	2–0	Castellón	Gijón
	Calandria 64'; Jorge 72'	Summary	Raúl Jiménez (red card) 17'	Stadium: El Molinón; Referee: Iglesias Villanueva

16 October 2005 8	Numancia	1–0	Real Sporting	Soria
	Navas 88'	Summary		Stadium: Los Pajaritos; Referee: Álvarez Izquierdo

23 October 2005 9	Real Sporting	1–1	Xerez	Gijón
	Pablo Álvarez 46'	Report	Iván Rosado 72'	Stadium: El Molinón; Referee: Herráez Prieto

29 October 2005 10	Hércules	3–2	Real Sporting	Alicante
	Juanmi 18' (o.g.); Toché 63'; Moisés 70'	Report	Biagini 11', 60'	Stadium: José Rico Pérez; Referee: Pérez Pérez

6 November 2005 11	Real Sporting	2–2	Ciudad de Murcia	Gijón
	Córdoba 66' (o.g.); Pablo Álvarez 90'	Summary	Piti 10'; Luque 45'	Stadium: El Molinón; Referee: Caballero Herreros

13 November 2005 12	Tenerife	1–3	Real Sporting	Santa Cruz de Tenerife
	Maikel 60'	Report	Biagini 12', 51', 54'	Stadium: Heliodoro Rodríguez López; Referee: Téllez Sánchez

19 November 2005 13	Lleida	0–1	Real Sporting	Lleida
		Report	Pablo Álvarez 5'	Stadium: Camp d'Esports; Referee: Bernabé García

27 November 2005 14	Real Sporting	1–1	Valladolid	Gijón
	Calandria 64'	Report	Capdevila 11'	Stadium: El Molinón; Referee: Álvarez Izquierdo

4 December 2005 15	Eibar	0–1	Real Sporting	Eibar
		Summary	Karanka 18'	Stadium: Ipurua; Referee: Mateu Lahoz

11 December 2005 16	Real Sporting	1–0	Lorca Deportiva	Gijón
	Calandria 67'	Summary		Stadium: El Molinón; Referee: Hevia Obras

17 December 2005 17	Levante	0–0	Real Sporting	Valencia
		Summary		Stadium: Ciutat de València; Referee: Iglesias Villanueva

21 December 2005 18	Real Sporting	1–1	Polideportivo Ejido	Gijón
	Calandria 66'	Report	Keko 30'	Stadium: El Molinón; Referee: Delgado Ferreiro

7 January 2006 19	Racing Ferrol	0–0	Real Sporting	Ferrol
		Summary		Stadium: A Malata; Referee: Paradas Romero

15 January 2006 20	Real Sporting	2–2	Elche	Gijón
	Calandria 22'; Pablo Álvarez 58'	Summary	Ivars 42'; Nino 90'	Stadium: El Molinón; Referee: Ceballos Silva

21 January 2006 21	Murcia	1–0	Real Sporting	Murcia
	Julio Álvarez 1'	Summary	Chus Bravo (yellow card) 0' (yellow-red card) 88'	Stadium: Nueva Condomina; Referee: González González

4 February 2006 23	Real Sporting	0–1	Lorca Deportiva	Gijón
		Summary	Ekopki 49'	Stadium: El Molinón; Referee: Gallo Moreno

12 February 2006 24	Recreativo	0–0	Real Sporting	Huelva
		Summary		Stadium: Nuevo Colombino; Referee: Álvarez Izquierdo

15 February 2006 22	Albacete	1–0	Real Sporting	Albacete
	Bermejo 31'	Report	Sastre (yellow card) 0' (yellow-red card) 30'	Stadium: Carlos Belmonte; Referee: Hevia Obras

18 February 2006 25	Real Sporting	0–0	Málaga B	Gijón
		Summary		Stadium: El Molinón; Referee: Ontanaya López

25 February 2006 26	Real Madrid Castilla	1–1	Real Sporting	Madrid
	Soldado 59'	Summary	Noriega 16'	Stadium: Valdebebas; Referee: Arcas Piqueres

4 March 2006 27	Real Sporting	1–0	Real Madrid Castilla	Gijón
	Pablo Álvarez 38'	Summary		Stadium: El Molinón; Referee: Amoedo Chas

11 March 2006 28	Castellón	1–0	Real Sporting	Castellón de la Plana
	Aurelio 35'; Castell (yellow card) 0' (yellow-red card) 85'	Summary		Stadium: Castalia; Referee: Gallo Moreno

19 March 2006 29	Real Sporting	1–0	Numancia	Gijón
	Calandria 1'; Míchel (yellow card) 0' (yellow-red card) 89'	Summary		Stadium: El Molinón; Referee: Martínez Franco

26 March 2006 30	Xerez	0–0	Real Sporting	Jerez de la Frontera
		Summary		Stadium: Chapín; Referee: Gardeazábal Gómez

1 April 2006 31	Real Sporting	1–1	Hércules	Gijón
	Biagini 56'; Dorado (red card) 89'	Summary	Kike Mateo 13'	Stadium: El Molinón; Referee: González González

8 April 2006 32	Ciudad de Murcia	1–0	Real Sporting	Murcia
	Piti 69'	Summary		Stadium: La Condomina; Referee: Ontanaya López

15 April 2006 33	Real Sporting	2–2	Tenerife	Gijón
	Calandria 26'; Gerardo 86'	Summary	César 9'; Cristo Marrero 43'	Stadium: El Molinón; Referee: Mateu Lahoz

23 April 2006 34	Real Sporting	2–0	Lleida	Gijón
	Calandria 29', 89'	Summary		Stadium: El Molinón; Referee: Perdigones Pacheco

29 April 2006 35	Valladolid	1–3	Real Sporting	Valladolid
	Llorente 30'; Ramis (red card) 41'	Summary	Gerardo 12'; Biagini 41', 81'	Stadium: José Zorrilla; Referee: Martínez Franco

6 May 2006 36	Real Sporting	1–1	Eibar	Gijón
	Juan 85'	Summary	Jaime 88'	Stadium: El Molinón; Referee: Paradas Romero

13 May 2006 37	Lorca Deportiva	1–0	Real Sporting	Lorca
	Ramos 44'	Summary		Stadium: Francisco Artés Carrasco; Referee: Amoedo Chas

19 May 2006 38	Real Sporting	0–2	Levante	Gijón
		Summary	Alexis 11'; Ettien 48'	Stadium: El Molinón; Referee: Ontanaya López

28 May 2006 39	Polideportivo Ejido	1–0	Real Sporting	El Ejido
	Vučko 88' (red card) 89'	Summary		Stadium: Santo Domingo; Referee: Herráez Prieto

3 June 2006 40	Real Sporting	3–1	Racing Ferrol	Gijón
	Biagini 55', 73'; Calandria 83'	Summary	Juanito 15'; Baha (red card) 59'	Stadium: El Molinón; Referee: Rodado Rodríguez

10 June 2006 41	Elche	0–0	Real Sporting	Elche
		Summary		Stadium: Manuel Martínez Valero; Referee: Perdigones Pacheco

17 June 2006 42	Real Sporting	1–0	Murcia	Gijón
	Calandria 47'	Summary		Stadium: El Molinón; Referee: Iglesias Villanueva

=== Copa del Rey ===
==== Matches ====
31 August 2005 Second round	Racing Ferrol	2–0	Real Sporting	Ferrol
	Baha 72' (yellow card) 0' (yellow-red card) 72'; Juan Carlos 89'	Report		Stadium: A Malata; Referee: Delgado Ferreiro

== Squad statistics ==
=== Appearances and goals ===
No.	Pos	Nat	Player	Total		Segunda División		Copa del Rey	
No.	Pos	Nat	Player	Apps	Goals	Apps	Goals	Apps	Goals
2	DF	(Spain) ESP	Blin	0	0	0+0	0	0+0	0
3	DF	(Spain) ESP	Chus Bravo	7	0	3+4	0	0+0	0
4	DF	(Spain) ESP	Miguel Carmena	6	0	3+3	0	0+0	0
5	DF	(Spain) ESP	Carlos Casquero	0	0	0+0	0	0+0	0
6	MF	(Spain) ESP	Javi Fuego	36	0	32+3	0	1+0	0
7	FW	(Spain) ESP	David Karanka	22	1	7+14	1	1+0	0
8	MF	(Spain) ESP	Juan	37	1	34+2	1	1+0	0
9	FW	(Argentina) ARG	Pablo Calandria	39	12	31+8	12	0+0	0
10	FW	(Argentina) ARG	Leonardo Biagini	35	11	19+15	11	1+0	0
11	MF	(Spain) ESP	Pablo Lago	27	0	11+15	0	1+0	0
12	MF	(Spain) ESP	Joaquín Enguix	35	0	34+1	0	0+0	0
13	GK	(Spain) ESP	Roberto	39	0	38+0	0	1+0	0
14	DF	(Netherlands) NED	Jeffrey	25	0	17+8	0	0+0	0
17	MF	(Spain) ESP	Álvaro Varela	2	0	0+1	0	0+1	0
18	MF	(Spain) ESP	Pablo Álvarez	27	8	27+0	8	0+0	0
20	MF	(Spain) ESP	Gerardo Noriega	36	4	29+7	4	0+0	0
21	DF	(Spain) ESP	Juanmi	34	0	29+4	0	1+0	0
22	DF	(Spain) ESP	Rafel Sastre	38	0	37+0	0	1+0	0
24	DF	(Spain) ESP	Javier Dorado	38	1	33+4	1	1+0	0
26	MF	(Spain) ESP	Míchel	24	1	15+9	1	0+0	0
27	DF	(Spain) ESP	Raúl Cámara	23	0	15+7	0	0+1	0
28	DF	(Spain) ESP	Manuel Lucena	4	0	0+3	0	1+0	0
29	MF	(Spain) ESP	Pedro Santa Cecilia	4	0	1+3	0	0+0	0
30	GK	(Spain) ESP	Alejandro	2	0	2+0	0	0+0	0
32	MF	(Spain) ESP	Pablo de Lucas	6	0	2+4	0	0+0	0
34	GK	(Spain) ESP	Manu	2	0	2+0	0	0+0	0
35	DF	(Spain) ESP	Moisés Blanco	2	0	0+1	0	1+0	0
36	DF	(Spain) ESP	Jorge	39	1	37+1	1	0+1	0
37	DF	(Spain) ESP	Noel Alonso	1	0	1+0	0	0+0	0
39	DF	(Spain) ESP	José Ángel	1	0	0+1	0	0+0	0
40	MF	(Spain) ESP	Marcos Landeira	4	0	3+1	0	0+0	0
41	DF	(Spain) ESP	Iván Guardado	1	0	0+1	0	0+0	0
