= Hoogervorst =

Hoogervorst is a Dutch surname. Notable people with the surname include:

- Hans Hoogervorst (born 1956), Dutch political and business figure
- Jan Hoogervorst, Dutch organizational theorist and business executive
- Jeffrey Hoogervorst, Dutch footballer
