= Juanmi =

Juanmi may refer to:

- Juanmi (footballer, born 1971), Spanish football goalkeeper
- Juanmi (footballer, born 1993), Spanish football forward
- Juanmi Callejón (born 1987), Spanish football midfielder
- Juanmi Gelabert (born 1972), Spanish football defender
- Juanmi Latasa (born 2001), Spanish football forward
- 178256 Juanmi, an asteroid
