= Karanka =

Karanka is a Basque surname. Notable people with the surname include:

- Aitor Karanka (born 1973), Spanish footballer and manager
- David Karanka (born 1978), Spanish footballer and manager, brother of Aitor
