= Xabi Sánchez =

Spanish footballer and manager

Personal information
- Full name: Xabier Sánchez Bringas
- Date of birth: 5 May 1978 (age 48)
- Place of birth: Oyón, Spain
- Height: 1.85 m (6 ft 1 in)
- Position: Midfielder

Youth career
- Athletic Bilbao

Senior career*
Years	Team	Apps	(Gls)
1996–1999	Bilbao Athletic	0	(0)
1996–1998	→ Santutxu (loan)		
1998–1999	→ Arenas (loan)		
1999–2000	Gernika	35	(2)
2000–2001	Alavés B	35	(0)
2001–2003	Eibar	43	(0)
2003–2005	Lorca Deportiva	57	(1)
2005–2006	Benidorm	20	(0)
2006–2007	Jaén	21	(0)
2007–2008	Mazarrón	25	(1)
2008–2009	Roquetas	23	(0)
2009–2014	Amorebieta	150	(0)
2014–2015	Portugalete	22	(1)
Total		431	(5)

Managerial career
- 2015–2017: Amorebieta (assistant)
- 2017–2018: Amorebieta B
- 2018: Amorebieta
- * Club domestic league appearances and goals

Xabier "Xabi" Sánchez Bringas (born 5 May 1978) is a Spanish football manager and former player who played as a midfielder.

== Playing career ==
Born in Oyón, Álava, Basque Country, Sánchez was an Athletic Bilbao youth graduate. After finishing his formation, he served loan stints at Tercera División sides Santutxu FC and Arenas Club de Getxo before signing for Gernika Club of the Segunda División B in 1999.

In 2001, after a year at Deportivo Alavés B, Sánchez joined Segunda División side SD Eibar. He made his professional debut on 10 October of that year, starting in a 0–1 away win against Gimnàstic de Tarragona in the season's Copa del Rey.

In 2003, Sánchez moved to Lorca Deportiva CF of the third tier, and helped in their first-ever promotion to the second division in 2005 before leaving for Benidorm CF. He subsequently represented third level sides Real Jaén, Mazarrón CF and CD Roquetas before joining SD Amorebieta in July 2009.

Sánchez was a regular starter for Amorebieta in his five-year spell, being a starter in the club's promotion campaign from the fourth tier. On 30 August 2014, he moved to Club Portugalete, and retired with the side in the following May at the age of 37.

== Coaching career ==
Immediately after retiring Sánchez took up coaching, being an assistant at his main club Amorebieta. He was named manager of the reserves in the regional leagues on 9 July 2017, but took over the first team the following 5 February after the departure of Joseba Etxeberria.

Sánchez left the managerial role in June 2018, after the appointment of Iñigo Vélez.
