= Noel Alonso =

Spanish footballer (born 1987)

Personal information
- Full name: Noel Alonso Pérez
- Date of birth: 19 March 1987 (age 39)
- Place of birth: Gijón, Spain
- Height: 1.78 m (5 ft 10 in)
- Position: Left back

Youth career
- 2002–2005: Sporting Gijón

Senior career*
Years	Team	Apps	(Gls)
2005–2007	Sporting Gijón B	28	(0)
2006–2009	Sporting Gijón	9	(0)
2007	→ Palencia (loan)	4	(0)
2008	→ Celta B (loan)	17	(0)
2008	→ Celta (loan)	3	(0)
2008–2009	→ Melilla (loan)	32	(0)
2009–2011	Pontevedra	33	(0)
2011–2012	Langreo	34	(3)
2012–2013	Caudal	34	(1)
2013–2014	Austria Klagenfurt	13	(0)
2014–2017	Caudal	109	(4)
2018–2019	Llanera	33	(5)

International career
2006	Spain U19	1	(0)
- * Club domestic league appearances and goals as of 19 May 2019

Noel Alonso Pérez (born 19 March 1987 in Gijón, Asturias) is a Spanish professional footballer who plays as a left back.
