= Carlos Rodríguez (footballer, born 1980) =

Spanish footballer

Carlos
Personal information
- Full name: Carlos Rodríguez Díaz
- Date of birth: 29 April 1980 (age 46)
- Place of birth: Madrid, Spain
- Height: 1.77 m (5 ft 10 in)
- Position: Midfielder

Youth career
- Las Rozas
- Atlético Madrid

Senior career*
Years	Team	Apps	(Gls)
1997–1999	Amorós		
1999–2004	Atlético Madrid B	117	(10)
2000	Atlético Madrid	2	(0)
2004–2006	Racing Ferrol	60	(7)
2006–2008	Jaén	63	(5)
2008–2010	Racing Ferrol	64	(4)
2010–2011	Cacereño	11	(0)
2011–2012	Racing Ferrol	?	(3)
2013–2014	O Parrulo		
2014	Narón	12	(4)
2014–2015	Rayo Majadahonda	19	(1)
Total		348	(34)
- * Club domestic league appearances and goals

Carlos Rodríguez Díaz (born 29 April 1980 in Madrid), known simply as Carlos, is a Spanish former footballer who played as a midfielder.
