= Antonio Rojas (Spanish footballer) =

Spanish footballer

Personal information
- Full name: Antonio Domingo Rojas Melero
- Date of birth: 22 March 1984 (age 42)
- Place of birth: Villarrobledo, Spain
- Height: 1.89 m (6 ft 2 in)
- Position: Centre forward

Youth career
- Villarrobledo
- Sporting Gijón

Senior career*
Years	Team	Apps	(Gls)
2003–2005	Sporting B		
2004	Sporting Gijón	2	(0)
2005–2006	Zaragoza B	25	(5)
2006–2007	Ourense	15	(3)
2007	→ Murcia B (loan)	23	(6)
2007–2008	Lleida	29	(0)
2008	Ontinyent	17	(1)
2009	Las Palmas B	18	(7)
2009–2010	Villajoyosa	34	(5)
2010–2011	Caravaca	34	(5)
2011–2012	Lemona	28	(4)
2012–2014	Caudal	60	(14)
2014–2015	Arroyo	33	(5)
2015	Villanovense	0	(0)
- * Club domestic league appearances and goals

Antonio Domingo Rojas Melero (born 22 March 1984) is a Spanish former footballer who played as a centre forward.
