= Jaime Ramos =

Spanish footballer and manager

Personal information
- Full name: Jaime Ramos Hernández
- Date of birth: 9 January 1973 (age 53)
- Place of birth: Madrid, Spain
- Height: 1.94 m (6 ft 4 in)
- Position: Defensive midfielder

Team information
- Current team: Santos Laguna (assistant)

Youth career
- Atlético Madrid

Senior career*
Years	Team	Apps	(Gls)
1991–1992	Atlético Madrid B		
1992–1993	Aranjuez		
1993–1996	Getafe	94	(2)
1996–1999	Leganés	111	(1)
1999–2001	Villarreal	45	(1)
2001–2003	Murcia	33	(1)
2003–2006	Almería	78	(1)
2006–2008	Écija	42	(1)
2008–2009	Alzira	29	(0)
2009–2011	San Fernando		
2011–2012	Coslada		
Total		432	(7)

Managerial career
- 2013–2014: Almería (assistant)
- 2016–2017: UCAM Murcia (assistant)
- 2017–2018: Lugo (assistant)
- 2018–2019: Huesca (assistant)
- 2020–2021: Girona (assistant)
- 2021–2022: Elche (assistant)
- 2023–2024: Rayo Vallecano (assistant)
- 2025–: Santos Laguna (assistant)
- * Club domestic league appearances and goals

Jaime Ramos Hernández (born 9 January 1973) is a Spanish retired footballer who played as a defensive midfielder, and is the current assistant head coach of Elche CF.

== Playing career ==
Born in Madrid, Ramos began his senior career with lowly Real Aranjuez CF. In 1994, he moved to Segunda División's Getafe CF, and made his professional debut on 4 September 1994, starting in a 0–0 home draw against UD Salamanca.

On 8 April 1995 Ramos scored his first professional goal, netting the game's only in a 1–0 home success over CD Ourense. He was an undisputed starter during his two-year spell, suffering relegation in the second.

In the 1996 summer Ramos moved to fellow league team CD Leganés. After three years playing in nearly all league matches, he joined Villarreal CF, also in the second level, winning promotion in his first campaign with the latter.

Ramos made his La Liga debut on 14 January 2001, coming on as a late substitute in a 2–0 home win against Celta de Vigo. His first goal in the competition came on 18 February, the game's winner of a 2–1 win against Real Valladolid also at the Estadio El Madrigal.

Ramos subsequently left the club in June 2001, and signed for Real Murcia in the second division. After appearing sparingly during the 2002–03 season (which ended in promotion), he moved to fellow league team UD Almería, appearing regularly in his three-year stay.

Ramos left the Andalusians in 2006, and subsequently resumed his career in Segunda División B and Tercera División, representing Écija Balompié, UD Alzira, CD San Fernando de Henares and CD Coslada. He retired with the latter in 2012, aged 39.

== Managerial career ==
Shortly after retiring, Ramos joined AFE's staff. In July 2013 he was appointed Francisco's assistant manager at Almería.

On 10 December 2014, after the manager's dismissal, Ramos also left the club. He subsequently followed Francisco to UCAM Murcia CF and CD Lugo, always as an assistant.
