= Alejandro García (footballer, born 1984) =

Spanish footballer

Alejandro
Personal information
- Full name: Alejandro García Torre
- Date of birth: 13 January 1984 (age 42)
- Place of birth: Gijón, Spain
- Height: 1.83 m (6 ft 0 in)
- Position: Goalkeeper

Youth career
- Sporting Gijón

Senior career*
Years	Team	Apps	(Gls)
2001–2005	Sporting Gijón B	97	(0)
2005–2007	Sporting Gijón	6	(0)
2007–2008	Cartagena	14	(0)
2008–2011	Ponferradina	54	(0)
2011–2013	Recreativo	22	(0)
2013–2014	Cádiz	23	(0)
2014	Racing Santander	7	(0)
2014–2015	Avilés	34	(0)
2015–2016	Barakaldo	31	(0)
2016–2017	Palencia	33	(0)
2017–2021	Llanera	100	(1)
2021–2022	Urraca	37	(0)
2022–2024	Llanera	65	(0)
Total		523	(0)
- * Club domestic league appearances and goals

Alejandro García Torre (born 13 January 1984), known simply as Alejandro, is a Spanish former professional footballer who played as a goalkeeper.

His twin brother, Jorge, was also a footballer (defender). Both began their career at local club Sporting de Gijón, and finished it with amateurs UD Llanera.
