= Rubén Párraga =

Spanish footballer

Personal information
- Full name: Antonio Rubén Párraga Ortiz
- Date of birth: 2 September 1984 (age 42)
- Place of birth: Málaga, Spain
- Height: 1.80 m (5 ft 11 in)
- Position: Left back

Youth career
- Alhaurino
- Málaga

Senior career*
Years	Team	Apps	(Gls)
2003–2006	Málaga B	84	(2)
2006–2009	Córdoba	76	(2)
2009–2010	Granada	41	(1)
2010–2011	Udinese	0	(0)
2010–2011	→ Granada (loan)	19	(0)
2011–2012	Murcia	7	(0)
2012–2013	Huesca	0	(0)
Total		227	(5)
- * Club domestic league appearances and goals

Antonio Rubén Párraga Ortiz (born 2 September 1984 in Málaga, Andalusia) is a Spanish retired footballer who played as a left back.
