= Zé Tó =

Portuguese footballer

Personal information
- Full name: José António Ramos Ribeiro
- Date of birth: 11 September 1977 (age 49)
- Place of birth: Lubango, Angola
- Height: 1.80 m (5 ft 11 in)
- Position: Attacking midfielder

Youth career
- Paço de Sousa
- Vitória Setúbal

Senior career*
| Years | Team | Apps | (Gls) |
| 1996–1997 | Vitória Setúbal | 3 | (0) |
| 1997–1999 | Lusitano Évora | | |
| 1999–2000 | Farense | 23 | (4) |
| 2000–2009 | Salamanca | 179 | (21) |
| 2002–2003 | → Badajoz (loan) | 53 | (8) |
| 2009 | Cerro Reyes | 7 | (0) |
| 2010–2011 | Estrela Vendas Novas | 26 | (4) |
| Total | | 291+ | (37+) |

International career
| 2000 | Portugal B | 1 | (0) |
- * Club domestic league appearances and goals

José Ántónio Ramos Ribeiro (born 11 September 1977), known as Zé Tó, is a Portuguese former professional footballer who played mainly as an attacking midfielder.

== Club career ==
Born in Lubango, Angola, Zé Tó began his professional career at Vitória de Setúbal, but could never break into the main squad. After a stint in the lower leagues, he first made an impact in the Primeira Liga with S.C. Farense.

In the summer of 2000, Zé Tó joined Spain's UD Salamanca, a team that included several compatriots. After a one and a half year on loan to fellow Segunda División side CD Badajoz, he returned and began appearing regularly (after only eight league games from August 2000–December 2001), going on to make 186 competitive appearances for the former.

After an unassuming 2008–09 season – five matches, 141 minutes of action – Zé Tó was released, arranging a deal with another Spanish club, lowly AD Cerro de Reyes, Badajoz's neighbours. However, he quickly grew unsettled, returning to his country after ten years and moving to the regional leagues with Estrela de Vendas Novas.
