= Sergio Gámiz =

Spanish footballer (born 1978)

Personal information
- Full name: Sergio Gámiz Chasco
- Date of birth: February 26, 1978 (age 48)
- Place of birth: santa Cruz de campezano, Spain
- Height: 1.85 m (6 ft 1 in)
- Position: Midfielder

Senior career*
Years	Team	Apps	(Gls)
1996–1997	Alavés	0	(0)
1997–1998	Aurrerá		
1998–2000	Badajoz	38	(0)
2000–2003	Leganés	69	(3)
2003–2004	Ponferradina	35	(7)
2004–2005	Badalona	29	(0)
2005–2006	Logroñés	28	(4)
2006–2007	Alcoyano	26	(0)
2007–2008	Mazarrón	26	(1)
2008–2010	Mirandés		
- * Club domestic league appearances and goals

Sergio Gámiz Chasco (born 26 February 1978 in Vitoria-Gasteiz, Álava) is a Spanish retired footballer who played as a defensive midfielder.
