= Jano (footballer, born 1980) =

Spanish footballer

Personal information
- Full name: Alejandro Fernández Vázquez
- Date of birth: 4 April 1980 (age 46)
- Place of birth: Langreo, Spain
- Height: 1.83 m (6 ft 0 in)
- Position: Centre-back

Youth career
- 1990–1995: Langreo
- 1995–1999: Sporting Gijón

Senior career*
Years	Team	Apps	(Gls)
1999–2002	Sporting Gijón B	82	(6)
2002–2003	Sporting Gijón	7	(0)
2003–2004	Avilés	33	(0)
2004–2006	Badajoz	66	(2)
2006–2007	Burgos	35	(0)
2007–2009	Écija	54	(2)
2009–2011	Ponferradina	54	(1)
2011–2013	Logroñés	60	(1)
2013–2015	Caudal	61	(1)
Total		452	(13)
- * Club domestic league appearances and goals

Alejandro Fernández Vázquez (born 4 April 1980 in Langreo, Asturias), known as Jano, is a Spanish former professional footballer who played as a central defender.
