= Pedro Ojeda =

Argentine footballer

Pedro "Perico" Ojeda (born 15 November 1972 in San Luis, Argentina) is an Argentine former professional footballer who played as a forward for clubs in Argentina, Chile and Spain.

== Clubs ==
- Gimnasia y Esgrima de Mendoza 1993–1994
- Godoy Cruz de Mendoza 1994–1996
- Coquimbo Unido 1996–1997
- Instituto de Córdoba 1997–1998
- Racing Club 1998–1999
- Numancia 1999–2003
- Talleres de Córdoba 2003
- Racing de Córdoba 2004
- General Paz Juniors 2005
- Estudiantes de San Luis 2006
- Luján de Cuyo 2006–2007
- Atlético Juventud Alianza 2007
