= Abel Segovia =

Spanish footballer

Personal information
- Full name: Francisco Abel Segovia Vega
- Date of birth: 2 September 1979 (age 47)
- Place of birth: Seville, Spain
- Height: 1.83 m (6 ft 0 in)
- Position: Midfielder

Team information
- Current team: Xerez (manager)

Youth career
- Sevilla

Senior career*
| Years | Team | Apps | (Gls) |
| 1998–2000 | Sevilla B | 61 | (4) |
| 2000–2001 | Real Madrid B | 42 | (2) |
| 2002 | Sporting B | 18 | (5) |
| 2002–2004 | Sporting Gijón | 36 | (1) |
| 2004 | Leganés | 13 | (0) |
| 2005 | Alavés B | 17 | (2) |
| 2005–2006 | Castellón | 19 | (0) |
| 2006–2008 | Mérida | 65 | (0) |
| 2008–2009 | Atlético Ciudad | 10 | (0) |
| 2009–2010 | Cultural Leonesa | 30 | (0) |
| 2010–2011 | Cacereño | 32 | (2) |
| 2011–2013 | Écija | 59 | (1) |
| Total | | 402 | (17) |

Managerial career
- 2018–2019: Gimnàstic (assistant)
- 2019–2020: Betis (youth assistant)
- 2020: UD Morón
- 2020–2021: Patriotas
- 2022–2023: Antequera
- 2023–2024: Sanluqueño
- 2025: Marbella
- 2025: Numancia
- 2026–: Xerez
- * Club domestic league appearances and goals

Francisco Abel Segovia Vega (born 2 September 1979) is a Spanish football manager and former player who played as a midfielder. He is the current manager of Segunda Federación side Xerez CD.

== Managerial statistics ==
As of 22 November 2026

Managerial record by team and tenure
| Team | Nat | From | To | Record | | | | | | | | Ref |
| Team | Nat | From | To | G | W | D | L | GF | GA | GD | Win % | Ref |
|---|---|---|---|---|---|---|---|---|---|---|---|---|
| UD Morón | (Spain) | 4 September 2020 | 18 November 2020 | 5 | 3 | 2 | 0 | 7 | 3 | +4 | 60.00 | |
| Patriotas | (Colombia) | 18 November 2020 | 27 April 2021 | 21 | 6 | 2 | 13 | 22 | 37 | −15 | 28.57 | |
| Antequera | (Spain) | 17 June 2022 | 31 May 2023 | 34 | 22 | 7 | 5 | 58 | 24 | +34 | 64.71 | |
| Sanluqueño | (Spain) | 30 October 2023 | 14 June 2024 | 30 | 9 | 9 | 12 | 20 | 28 | −8 | 30.00 | |
| Marbella | (Spain) | 21 January 2025 | 25 March 2025 | 9 | 1 | 3 | 5 | 8 | 15 | −7 | 11.11 | |
| Numancia | (Spain) | 21 June 2025 | 14 October 2025 | 6 | 2 | 2 | 2 | 7 | 9 | −2 | 33.33 | |
| Xerez | (Spain) | 1 October 2026 | Present | 9 | 6 | 1 | 2 | 16 | 7 | +9 | 66.67 | |
| Total | | | | 114 | 49 | 26 | 39 | 138 | 123 | +15 | 42.98 | — |
