= Igor Taševski =

Serbian footballer

Personal information
- Full name: Igor Taševski
- Date of birth: 25 July 1972 (age 54)
- Place of birth: Belgrade, SR Serbia, SFR Yugoslavia
- Height: 1.85 m (6 ft 1 in)
- Position: Defender

Youth career
- Rad

Senior career*
Years	Team	Apps	(Gls)
1990–1994	Rad	61	(1)
1994–1998	Partizan	121	(1)
1998–2002	Villarreal	67	(0)
2001–2002	→ Elche (loan)	40	(0)
2002–2003	Sporting Gijón	39	(1)
2003–2005	Elche	52	(0)
2005–2006	Voždovac	6	(0)
Total		386	(3)

Managerial career
- 2017–2025: Villarreal (academy)
- * Club domestic league appearances and goals

Igor Taševski (Serbian Cyrillic: Игор Ташевски; born 25 July 1972) is a Serbian former professional footballer who played as a defender of Macedonian origine.

== Career ==
Taševski came through the youth system at Rad at the same time as Željko Cicović and Zoran Mirković, notably winning the Yugoslav youth championship in 1989. He made his senior debut during the 1990–91 Yugoslav First League.

In the summer of 1994, Taševski was transferred to Partizan. He spent four seasons with the club, winning back-to-back league titles in 1996 and 1997.

In the summer of 1998, Taševski moved abroad and signed with Spanish club Villarreal. He helped them return to La Liga after just one year while contributing with 35 games (33 starts). Following spells at Elche and Sporting Gijón, Taševski returned to his homeland and retired with Voždovac in 2006.

== Honours ==
Partizan

- First League of FR Yugoslavia: 1995–96, 1996–97
- FR Yugoslavia Cup: 1997–98
