= Alejandro Vázquez =

Spanish footballer

Personal information
- Full name: Alejandro Vázquez Sotorrío
- Date of birth: 16 March 1983 (age 43)
- Place of birth: Gijón, Spain
- Height: 1.73 m (5 ft 8 in)
- Position: Left back

Youth career
- 1991–2001: Sporting Gijón

Senior career*
Years	Team	Apps	(Gls)
2001–2005	Sporting B		
2003–2005	Sporting Gijón	3	(0)
2005–2008	Linares	81	(1)
2008–2009	Levante	3	(0)
2009	Alicante	14	(0)
2010	Ceuta	13	(1)
2010–2011	Barakaldo	8	(0)
2011–2013	Cultural Leonesa	40	(5)
2013–2014	Arandina	4	(0)
2015	Lucena	6	(0)
2015–2016	Tuilla	8	(0)
2016	Europa		
2016	Torrevieja	5	(0)
2016–2017	Los Barrios	23	(0)
2017	Avilés	12	(0)
2017–2020	Los Barrios	67	(0)
- * Club domestic league appearances and goals

Alejandro Vázquez Sotorrío (born 16 March 1983) is a Spanish former footballer who played as a left back.

== Football career ==
Vázquez was born in Gijón, Asturias. After playing for every rank at local Sporting de Gijón's youth system, he could only amass three appearances for the first team in two seasons combined, both in the second division.

Vázquez then spent three additional years at lowly CD Linares, signing for 2008–09 with another second level club, Levante UD, and appearing very rarely in his sole campaign after which he was released, joining Alicante CF in Segunda División B. After spells in Alicante and AD Ceuta, Vázquez played for several clubs in Tercera División.
