= Blin (footballer) =

Spanish footballer

Personal information
- Full name: Pablo Fernández Antuña
- Date of birth: 13 March 1979 (age 47)
- Place of birth: La Felguera, Spain
- Height: 1.80 m (5 ft 11 in)
- Position: Right back

Youth career
- Sporting Gijón

Senior career*
Years	Team	Apps	(Gls)
1998–2000	Sporting B	76	(1)
2000–2005	Sporting Gijón	23	(0)
2003–2004	→ Avilés (loan)	29	(1)
- * Club domestic league appearances and goals

Pablo Fernández Antuña (born 13 March 1979), commonly known as Blin, is a Spanish retired footballer who played as a right back.

== Club career ==
Blin was born in La Felguera, Langreo, Asturias, and was a Sporting de Gijón youth graduate. He made his senior debut with the reserves during the 1997–98 season, and went on to play several seasons in Segunda División B.

Blin made his debut with the main squad on 26 November 2000, starting in a 0–1 Segunda División home loss against Recreativo de Huelva. He became a regular first-team starter afterwards, contributing with 22 appearances as his side finished seventh.

Blin subsequently struggled severely with injuries, featuring in only one further match after his first injury. He also spent the 2003–04 campaign on loan at third division side Real Avilés.

In March 2006, Blin was officially dismissed by the club.
