= Juanmi Gelabert =

Spanish footballer

Personal information
- Full name: Juan Miguel Gelabert Margüello
- Date of birth: 19 September 1972 (age 54)
- Place of birth: Capdepera, Spain
- Height: 1.82 m (6 ft 0 in)
- Position: Defender

Youth career
- CE Escolar
- Mallorca

Senior career*
Years	Team	Apps	(Gls)
1991–1995	Palencia	80	(3)
1991–1992	→ Venta Baños (loan)		
1995–1998	Elche	113	(1)
1998–2000	Hércules	54	(3)
2000–2001	Recreativo	40	(0)
2001–2003	Sevilla	23	(0)
2003–2005	Córdoba	52	(0)
2005–2007	Sporting Gijón	61	(0)
Total		423	(7)
- * Club domestic league appearances and goals

Juan Miguel "Juanmi" Gelabert Margüello (born 19 September 1972), sometimes known as just Juanmi, is a Spanish retired footballer who played as a central defender or a left back.

== Football career ==
Born in Capdepera, Majorca, Balearic Islands, Gelabert played five of his first seven years as a senior in the third division, his only season in the second level being 1997–98 with Elche CF (39 games, all starts, team relegation). In the following campaign he signed for Valencian neighbours Hércules CF – in the same category – and met the same fate.

In 2000–01, Gelabert returned to division two with Recreativo de Huelva. His solid performances attracted the attention of another Andalusian club, Sevilla CF, which had promoted to La Liga in precisely that season, but he was used sparingly during his spell with his new team, only playing in five games in his second year.

Gelabert played his final four seasons as a professional in the second tier, with Córdoba CF and Sporting de Gijón. In 2007, after having been hit by a ball in his left eye in a match against Cádiz CF, he was forced to retired from football, at the age of 34. He immediately began working towards obtaining his coaching license and as a director of football, adding some appearances as a sports commentator.

In the 2011–12 season, Gelabert returned to Hércules as head of the youth ranks.

== Personal life ==
Gelabert's son César is also a footballer. A midfielder, he was part of the Real Madrid youth setup.
