= David Bauzá =

Spanish footballer

Personal information
- Full name: David Bauzá Francés
- Date of birth: 29 May 1976 (age 50)
- Place of birth: Alicante, Spain
- Height: 1.84 m (6 ft 1/2 in)
- Position: Defensive midfielder

Senior career*
| Years | Team | Apps | (Gls) |
| 1996–1997 | Barcelona C | | |
| 1997–1998 | Pájara Playas | 16 | (0) |
| 1998–1999 | Yeclano | 38 | (1) |
| 1999 | Gramenet | 3 | (0) |
| 1999–2000 | Gandía | 33 | (6) |
| 2000–2002 | Badajoz | 76 | (5) |
| 2002–2005 | Sporting Gijón | 73 | (2) |
| 2005–2008 | Albacete | 98 | (4) |
| 2008–2010 | Gimnàstic | 71 | (2) |
| 2010–2012 | Huesca | 36 | (3) |
| Total | | 444 | (23) |

Managerial career
- 2017–2018: Universidad Alicante
- 2018–2019: Eldense
- 2019: Hércules (youth)
- 2020–2021: Novelda
- 2021–2023: La Nucía (assistant)
- 2023: La Nucía B
- * Club domestic league appearances and goals

David Bauzá Francés (born 29 May 1976) is a Spanish former professional footballer who played as a defensive midfielder, currently a manager.

== Club career ==
Bauzá was born in Alicante, Valencian Community. He appeared in 354 Segunda División matches and scored 16 goals over 12 seasons, representing five clubs in that tier, mainly Sporting de Gijón and Albacete Balompié (three years apiece).

Late into his career, during his spell with SD Huesca, Bauzá suffered two nearly-consecutive anterior cruciate ligament injuries – right and left knees – which sidelined him for a period of almost two years. He retired at the end of the 2011–12 campaign whilst at the service of that team, aged 36.
