= Cristian Díaz (footballer, born 1976) =

Argentine footballer

Personal information
- Full name: Cristian Fabián Díaz Sichi
- Date of birth: 18 May 1976 (age 50)
- Place of birth: Buenos Aires, Argentina
- Height: 1.85 m (6 ft 1 in)
- Position: Centre back

Senior career*
| Years | Team | Apps | (Gls) |
| 1995–1997 | Platense | 67 | (1) |
| 1997–1998 | Atlético B | 28 | (4) |
| 1998–1999 | Atlético Madrid | 0 | (0) |
| 1999 | → Málaga (loan) | 5 | (0) |
| 2000 | Elche | 19 | (3) |
| 2000–2002 | Salamanca | 61 | (3) |
| 2002–2005 | Sporting Gijón | 71 | (4) |
| 2005–2007 | Ciudad Murcia | 40 | (3) |
| 2007–2008 | Granada 74 | 19 | (0) |
| 2008–2009 | Atlético Ciudad | 6 | (2) |
| Total | | 316 | (20) |

International career
| 1995 | Argentina U20 | 3 | (1) |
- * Club domestic league appearances and goals

Cristian Fabián Díaz Sichi (born 18 May 1976 in Buenos Aires) is an Argentine retired footballer who played as a central defender.

== Football career ==
After beginning his career with native Club Atlético Platense, 21-year-old Díaz moved to Spain in 1997, going on to remain in the country the following 12 seasons. Two years earlier, he was picked to represent Argentina at the FIFA U-20 World Cup, with the national team winning the tournament in Qatar after defeating Brazil 2–0; during his career, he was nicknamed Camioncito (Little Truck).

Díaz started with Atlético Madrid, all but representing the reserve side during his spell – the exception to this was on 14 April 1998, when he started in a 0–0 away draw against S.S. Lazio for the semi-finals of the UEFA Cup where he was charged with marking Alen Bokšić, excelling in the task as the Spaniards lost 0–1 on aggregate. Also in the second division (where he played with Atlético B), he represented Málaga CF, Elche CF, UD Salamanca, Sporting de Gijón, Ciudad de Murcia and Granada 74 CF – who rose from the ashes of Ciudad – retiring at CF Atlético Ciudad in the third level at the age of 33.

In the 1998–99 campaign, Díaz achieved his biggest team success, winning La Liga promotion with Andalusia's Málaga. He only contributed with five matches to this feat, however, having arrived during the winter break.

After retiring, Díaz worked as assistant to Granada CF president Quique Pina.

== Honours ==
=== Club ===
Málaga

- Segunda División: 1998–99

=== International ===
Argentina

- FIFA U-20 World Cup: 1995
