= Miguel Cobas =

Spanish footballer

Personal information
- Full name: Miguel Cobas Obarrio
- Date of birth: July 14, 1977 (age 49)
- Place of birth: Avilés, Spain
- Height: 1.90 m (6 ft 3 in)
- Position: Midfielder

Youth career
- Sporting Gijón

Senior career*
| Years | Team | Apps | (Gls) |
| 1997–1999 | Sporting B | 46 | (6) |
| 1998–2004 | Sporting Gijón | 70 | (1) |
| 2004–2006 | Racing Ferrol | 60 | (1) |
| 2006–2009 | Las Palmas | 59 | (0) |
| Total | | 235 | (8) |
- * Club domestic league appearances and goals

Miguel Cobas Obarrio (born 14 July 1977) is a Spanish retired footballer who played as a midfielder.

A product of the Sporting de Gijón's prolific youth setup, Cobas amassed 189 matches and only three goals in Segunda División. An injury-prone player, he retired in June 2009 with UD Las Palmas, after suffering a serious knee injury.
