= Irurzun =

Spanish footballer

Personal information
- Full name: Ismael Marchal Razquín
- Date of birth: 21 March 1975 (age 51)
- Place of birth: Pamplona, Spain
- Height: 1.74 m (5 ft 8 1/2 in)
- Position: Striker

Youth career
- Moscardó

Senior career*
Years	Team	Apps	(Gls)
1993–1994	Moscardó		
1994–1996	Real Madrid C	61	(23)
1996–1998	Real Madrid B	57	(15)
1996	Real Madrid	1	(0)
1998–2001	Málaga	16	(0)
1999–2000	→ Osasuna (loan)	25	(1)
2001–2002	Racing Ferrol	42	(17)
2002–2005	Sporting Gijón	96	(20)
2005–2007	Gimnàstic	59	(13)
2007–2009	Ponferradina	40	(8)
2009	Mutilvera		
Total		397+	(97+)
- * Club domestic league appearances and goals

Ismael Marchal Razquín (born 21 March 1975 in Pamplona, Navarre), known as Irurzun, is a Spanish former professional footballer who played as a striker.

== Honours ==
Real Madrid

- La Liga: 1996–97

Málaga

- Segunda División: 1998–99
