= Jesús Vázquez (footballer, born 1980) =

Spanish footballer

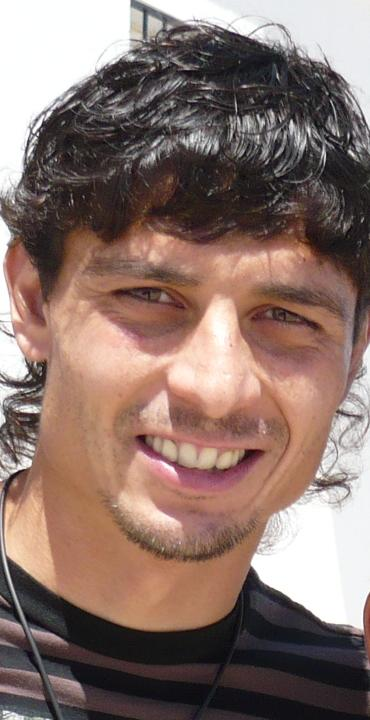
- Vázquez in 2009

Personal information
- Full name: Antonio Jesús Vázquez Muñoz
- Date of birth: 18 January 1980 (age 46)
- Place of birth: Santa Olalla, Spain
- Height: 1.82 m (6 ft 0 in)
- Position: Midfielder

Team information
- Current team: Recreativo (president)

Youth career
- Extremadura

Senior career*
Years	Team	Apps	(Gls)
1998–1999	Extremadura B		
1999–2002	Extremadura	74	(9)
2002–2006	Tenerife	147	(13)
2006–2011	Recreativo	175	(16)
2011–2013	Deportivo La Coruña	20	(0)
2013–2017	Recreativo	131	(7)
Total		547	(45)

Managerial career
- 2017–2018: Recreativo B
- * Club domestic league appearances and goals

Antonio Jesús Vázquez Muñoz (born 18 January 1980), known as Jesús Vázquez, is a Spanish former professional footballer who played as a midfielder.

He played 382 Segunda División games and scored 34 goals over 12 seasons, representing mainly Tenerife and Recreativo (four years apiece). He added 105 appearances in La Liga in a 19-year senior career, with the second club as well as Deportivo.

== Club career ==
Born in Santa Olalla del Cala, Province of Huelva, Andalusia, Vázquez first played professionally in the Segunda División, with CF Extremadura and CD Tenerife, for a total of seven years. In the 2001–02 season, whilst with the former, he scored a career-best six goals in 39 games but saw his team get relegated.

For the 2006–07 campaign, Vázquez joined Recreativo de Huelva, recently promoted to La Liga, going on to be an undisputed first choice for his hometown club. He never appeared in less than 29 matches during his tenure, precisely when the side were relegated from the top flight at the end of 2008–09.

Vázquez left Recre in late June 2011 at age 31, and signed with Deportivo de La Coruña for two years. He spent his first season nursing a serious leg injury, but still contributed 1,029 minutes in 12 starts to help the team to return to the top division after only one year.

On 12 July 2013, Vázquez returned to the Estadio Nuevo Colombino, with the club still in the second tier. He totalled 71 league appearances in his first two years (four goals), but was relegated at the end of the second.

Vázquez announced his retirement in May 2017, at the age of 37. After one season as manager of Recreativo's reserves in the regional leagues, he was appointed youth system coordinator.

On 19 June 2023, Vázquez was elected president of Recreativo.

== Honours ==
Deportivo

- Segunda División: 2011–12
