= Carlos Casquero =

Spanish footballer

Personal information
- Full name: Carlos Agustín Casquero Ruiz
- Date of birth: 14 September 1981 (age 45)
- Place of birth: Sant Boi, Spain
- Height: 1.80 m (5 ft 11 in)
- Position: Midfielder

Youth career
- 1997–1999: Oviedo

Senior career*
Years	Team	Apps	(Gls)
1999–2002	Oviedo B	64	(2)
2002–2004	Sporting B	42	(2)
2004–2006	Sporting Gijón	6	(0)
2005	→ Jaén (loan)	7	(0)
2006	→ Pájara Playas (loan)	16	(2)
2006–2007	Granada Atlético	25	(1)
2007–2008	Pájara Playas	27	(1)
2008–2010	Leganés	45	(1)
2010–2011	Târgu Mureş	6	(0)
2011	Extremadura	12	(0)
2011–2012	Lleida Esportiu	17	(0)
2012–2013	Puertollano	10	(0)
2013	Estepona	11	(0)
Total		288	(9)
- * Club domestic league appearances and goals

Carlos Agustín Casquero Ruiz (born 14 September 1981 in Sant Boi de Llobregat, Barcelona, Catalonia) is a Spanish retired footballer who played as a defensive midfielder.
