= Diego Alegre =

Spanish footballer

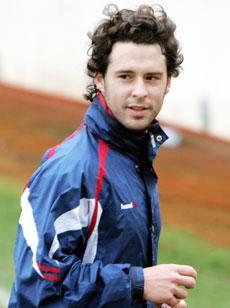

Personal information
- Full name: Diego Alegre Gil
- Date of birth: 22 March 1982 (age 44)
- Place of birth: Valencia, Spain
- Height: 1.76 m (5 ft 9 1/2 in)
- Position: Right-back

Youth career
- Valencia

Senior career*
Years	Team	Apps	(Gls)
2001–2002	Valencia B	31	(0)
2002–2005	Sporting Gijón	58	(1)
2005–2006	Ciudad Murcia	28	(0)
2006–2009	Albacete	60	(1)
2010	Conquense	5	(0)
2010–2013	Ontinyent	97	(0)
Total		279	(2)

International career
1999	Spain U16	6	(2)
1999	Spain U17	3	(0)
2000–2001	Spain U18	8	(0)
2002	Spain U20	2	(0)
Medal record
Representing Spain
UEFA European Under-16 Championship
Winner	1999 Czech Republic
- * Club domestic league appearances and goals

Diego Alegre Gil (born 22 March 1982 in Valencia) is a Spanish retired footballer who played as a right-back.

== Honours ==
Spain U16

- UEFA European Under-16 Championship: 1999
