= Carlos Clos Gómez =

Spanish football referee (born 1972)

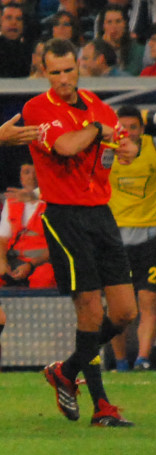
- Full name: Carlos Clos Gómez
- Born: 30 June 1972 (age 54); Zaragoza, Spain

Domestic
Years	League	Role

International
Years	League	Role
2009–2017	FIFA listed	Referee

Carlos Clos Gómez (born 30 June 1972 in Zaragoza, Spain) is a First Division football referee. He became a UEFA class referee in January 2009.

He began refereeing football matches in 1988, after a year in futsal. In 2001 he played his first game in the Second Division, and in 2006 he made his debut in First. In 2009 he became a FIFA referee, which allowed him to participate in international matches. Thus, he refereed the Europa League matches and the preparation of the 2014 World Cup in Brazil and was an assistant referee in Euro 2012 and the Champions League. In 2017 he had to retire at the age of 45, the age limit for refereeing.

In 2008, Clos Gómez was forced to abandon a match between Real Betis and Athletic Bilbao after an Athletic player was struck by a bottle thrown from the crowd.

Clos Gómez was named to FIFA's international list in 2009, and has served as a referee during qualification for the 2014 FIFA World Cup, beginning with the 7 September 2012 match between Lithuania and Slovakia.
