= Samuel Baños =

Spanish footballer

Samuel
Personal information
- Full name: Samuel Baños Cardín
- Date of birth: 16 August 1979 (age 47)
- Place of birth: Villaviciosa, Spain
- Height: 1.75 m (5 ft 9 in)
- Position: Midfielder

Youth career
- 1985–1994: Juventud Estadio
- 1994–1997: Sporting Gijón

Senior career*
Years	Team	Apps	(Gls)
1996–2001	Sporting Gijón B	101	(4)
2000–2005	Sporting Gijón	93	(3)
2005–2008	Murcia	55	(3)
2007–2008	→ Xerez (loan)	31	(0)
2008–2010	Levante	47	(2)
2010–2011	Alcorcón	28	(1)
2011–2012	Sabadell	17	(0)
2012–2013	Atlético Baleares	24	(0)
2013–2015	Caudal	51	(4)
2015–2016	Marino	18	(0)
2016–2017	L'Entregu	2	(0)
Total		467	(17)

International career
1995–1996	Spain U16	5	(0)
1997	Spain U17	5	(0)
1997	Spain U18	3	(0)

Managerial career
- 2017–2018: Lealtad (assistant)
- 2018–2019: Lealtad
- 2019–2021: Sporting Gijón B
- 2021–2022: Langreo
- 2022–2023: Sporting Gijón B (assistant)
- 2023–2025: Sporting Gijón C
- 2025–2026: Sporting Gijón B
- * Club domestic league appearances and goals

Samuel Baños Cardín (born 16 August 1979), known simply as Samuel, is a Spanish former professional footballer who played as a midfielder.

== Playing career ==
Samuel was born in Villaviciosa, Asturias. A product of Sporting de Gijón's youth system at Mareo, he spent the vast majority of his career in the Segunda División, with Sporting, Real Murcia CF, Xerez CD, Levante UD, AD Alcorcón and CE Sabadell FC. He amassed totals of 271 matches and nine goals over 13 seasons in that tier, promoting to La Liga with the second and fourth clubs.

On 31 August 2012, aged 33, Samuel returned to Segunda División B where he had already represented Sporting B the previous decade, signing for CD Atlético Baleares.

== Coaching career ==
Samuel started his managerial career in 2017 as assistant coach of his hometown club CD Lealtad, and took the reins of the team the following year. They finished the season unbeaten, but could not achieve promotion from Tercera División after falling in the playoffs to Getafe CF B and CP Villarrobledo.

On 6 July 2019, Samuel was appointed at Sporting Gijón's reserves.

== Managerial statistics ==
As of 24 May 2026

Managerial record by team and tenure
Team	Nat	From	To	Record								Ref
Team	Nat	From	To	G	W	D	L	GF	GA	GD	Win %	Ref
Lealtad	(Spain)	12 June 2018	6 July 2019	53	33	16	4	94	31	+63	62.26	
Sporting Gijón B	(Spain)	6 July 2019	25 January 2021	37	11	7	19	43	45	−2	29.73	
Langreo	(Spain)	11 June 2021	4 April 2022	29	8	10	11	31	34	−3	27.59	
Sporting Gijón C	(Spain)	19 July 2023	26 March 2025	65	41	12	12	112	45	+67	63.08	
Sporting Gijón B	(Spain)	26 March 2025	16 June 2026	47	25	14	8	98	38	+60	53.19	
Total				231	118	59	54	378	193	+185	51.08	—
