= Dani Borreguero =

Spanish footballer

Personal information
- Full name: Daniel Borreguero Reina
- Date of birth: 16 November 1975 (age 50)
- Place of birth: Barcelona, Spain
- Height: 1.66 m (5 ft 5 in)
- Position: Midfielder

Senior career*
Years	Team	Apps	(Gls)
1995–1997	Hospitalet	69	(5)
1997–2001	Elche	135	(8)
2001–2005	Sporting Gijón	143	(12)
2005–2006	Hércules	25	(2)
2006–2010	Ponferradina	117	(4)
2010	Atlético Bembibre		
2015–2016	Colunga	16	(2)
2016–2018	Gijón Industrial	21	(1)
2018–2019	Llanera	32	(3)
Total		558	(37)
- * Club domestic league appearances and goals

Daniel 'Dani' Borreguero Reina (born 16 November 1975) is a Spanish former professional footballer who played as a midfielder.

In a 24-year senior career, he amassed Segunda División totals of 307 matches and 18 goals over nine seasons, representing in the competition Elche, Sporting de Gijón, Hércules and Ponferradina.

== Club career ==
Born in Barcelona, Catalonia, Borreguero started his professional career with local CE L'Hospitalet. He signed for Segunda División side Elche CF in 1997, going on to spend the next 12 years at that level in service of Sporting de Gijón, Hércules CF and SD Ponferradina and being relegated with the latter team in the 2006–07 season.

In 2009–10, Borreguero contributed 13 games as Ponferradina returned to the second tier after a three-year absence, as group champions. Midway through the campaign, aged 34, he moved to amateurs CA Bembibre, retiring a couple of months later.

On 8 July 2015, aged 39, Borreguero returned to active and joined amateurs CD Colunga. One year later, he signed with UD Gijón Industrial.

Borreguero retired for good in June 2019, his last club being UD Llanera also from Asturias.
