= Jeffrey Hoogervorst =

Dutch footballer

Personal information
- Full name: Jeffrey Hoogervorst
- Date of birth: 23 October 1984 (age 42)
- Place of birth: Amsterdam, Netherlands
- Height: 1.84 m (6 ft 0 in)
- Position: Centre back

Youth career
- Ajax

Senior career*
Years	Team	Apps	(Gls)
2002–2006	Sporting Gijón	35	(0)
2002–2003	→ Marino (loan)	27	(4)
2006	Real Madrid B	1	(0)
2007–2008	Barcelona B	16	(1)
2009–2010	Marino	22	(3)
2010–2011	Zamora	24	(0)
2011–2013	Avilés	29	(0)
2013–2014	Villaralbo	6	(1)
Total		160	(9)

International career
1999	Netherlands U15	1	(1)
1999	Netherlands U16	1	(0)
2002	Netherlands U18	3	(0)
2002	Netherlands U19	1	(0)
- * Club domestic league appearances and goals

Jeffrey Hoogervorst (born 23 October 1984) is a Dutch retired footballer who played as a central defender.

== Club career ==
Born in Amsterdam, Hoogervorst moved at only 18 from local AFC Ajax to Sporting de Gijón in Spain, after signing a three-year contract. With the Segunda División club he only appeared regularly in the 2005–06 season, also serving a loan at lowly Asturias neighbours Marino de Luanco.

In summer 2006, Hoogervorst agreed to a deal at Real Madrid Castilla also in the second level, but was highly unsuccessful during his brief spell, playing only one match (one minute) as the team were also relegated; in the following transfer window he dropped down to Segunda División B after joining FC Barcelona B, being finally released by the Pep Guardiola-led side in March 2008.

Hoogervorst returned to football ahead of the 2009–10 campaign, moving to Tercera División and returning to former club Marino. He continued to play in Spain's lower leagues until his retirement.

== International career ==
Hoogervorst was capped once by the Netherlands national under-16 football team.
