= Juan Díaz (footballer, born 1977) =

Spanish footballer

Personal information
- Full name: Juan Díaz Prendes
- Date of birth: 28 June 1977 (age 49)
- Place of birth: Gijón, Spain
- Height: 1.84 m (6 ft 0 in)
- Position: Midfielder

Youth career
- 1987–1991: Victoria Perlora
- 1991–1995: Sporting Gijón

Senior career*
Years	Team	Apps	(Gls)
1996–1997	Candás		
1997–1998	Gijón Industrial		
1998–2001	Sporting Gijón B	75	(6)
2001–2006	Sporting Gijón	202	(9)
2006–2007	Gimnàstic	30	(0)
2007–2009	Polideportivo Ejido	64	(0)
2010	Montañeros	13	(1)
2010–2011	Alcalá		(1)
2011–2013	Avilés		
- * Club domestic league appearances and goals

Juan Díaz Prendes (born 28 June 1977) is a Spanish retired footballer who played as a midfielder.

== Career ==
Born in Gijón, Asturias, Juan Díaz joined Sporting de Gijón in 1991 at the age of 14.

After several years playing in Asturias, he made his professional debut in Segunda División with Sporting Gijón on 28 January 2001, in an away win against Universidad de Las Palmas by 2–0.

At the end of the 2005–06 season, Juan Díaz signed with Gimnàstic de Tarragona, freshly promoted to La Liga. He played his first game in the top tier on 27 August 2006, as a starter in the away win by 1–0 against RCD Espanyol.

He finally retired in 2013 after playing two years with Real Avilés.
