= Pablo Álvarez (footballer, born 1980) =

Spanish footballer

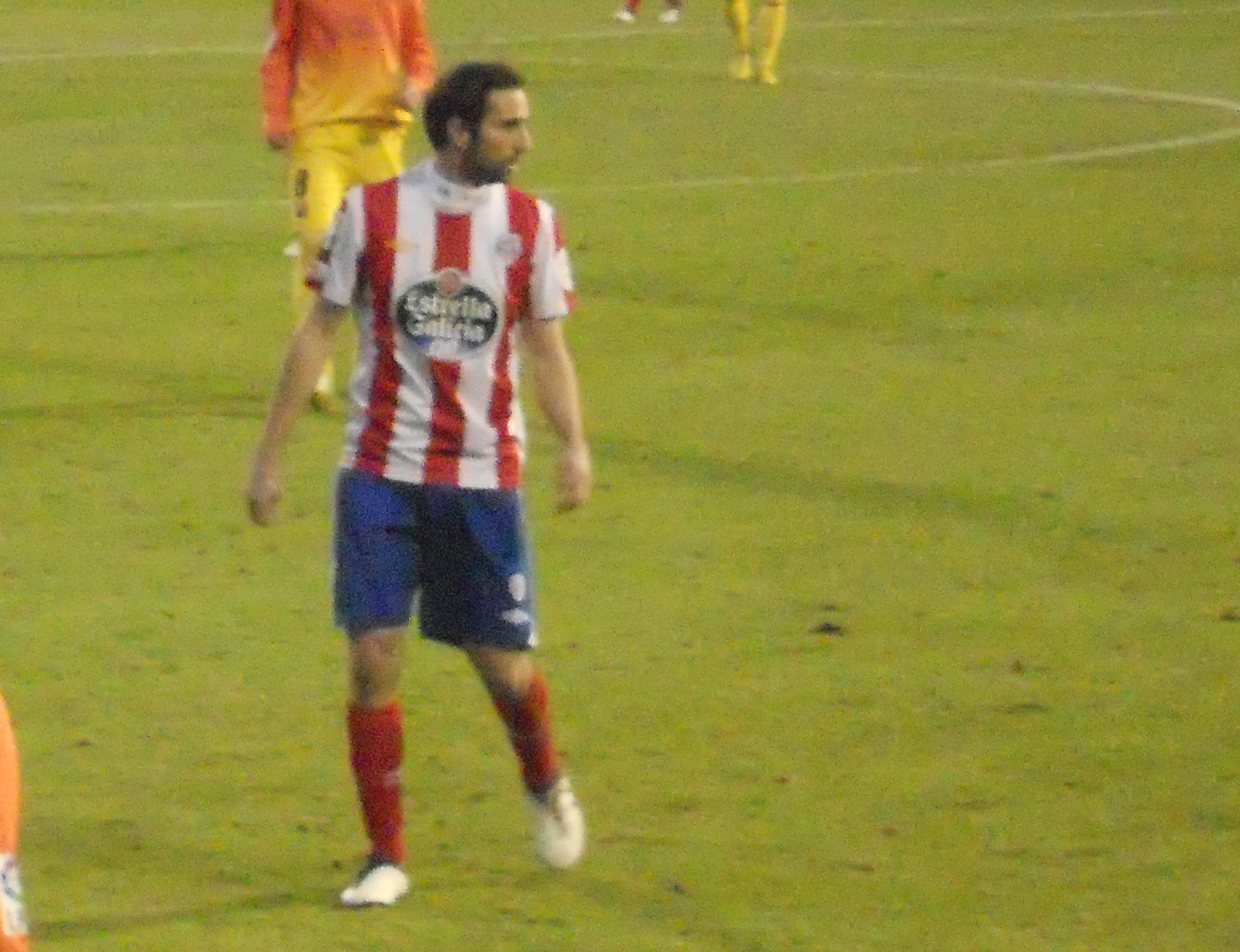
- Álvarez in 2012

Personal information
- Full name: Pablo Álvarez Núñez
- Date of birth: 14 May 1980 (age 46)
- Place of birth: Oviedo, Spain
- Height: 1.74 m (5 ft 9 in)
- Position: Midfielder

Youth career
- 1989–1998: Lugo

Senior career*
Years	Team	Apps	(Gls)
1998–2001	Sporting Gijón B	52	(6)
2001–2006	Sporting Gijón	161	(25)
2006–2012	Deportivo La Coruña	85	(5)
2008	→ Racing Santander (loan)	18	(1)
2012–2014	Lugo	47	(4)
2014	Langreo	12	(0)
2015	New York City	8	(0)
2015	→ Wilmington Hammerheads (loan)	3	(0)
2016	Langreo	5	(2)
2016–2018	Llanera	20	(10)
Total		411	(53)

International career
2005–2008	Galicia	3	(0)
- * Club domestic league appearances and goals

Pablo Álvarez Núñez (born 14 May 1980) is a Spanish former professional footballer who played as a right midfielder.

== Club career ==
Born in Oviedo, Asturias, Álvarez started his professional career at neighbouring Sporting de Gijón, making his first-team debut on 19 May 2001 in a 1–2 home defeat against Real Betis in the Segunda División and going on to appear in 168 games in all competitions. At Gijón, he earned the nickname Tibu (diminutive of Tiburón, shark in Spanish) for his goal celebrations, in which he pretended to have a shark's fin in his head.

Álvarez signed for Deportivo de La Coruña on a free transfer in August 2006. On 3 February 2007, he played his first league match for Depor, making his La Liga debut against Mallorca aged 26. He had suffered a serious leg injury while still at the service of Sporting in April 2006, and was eventually loaned to Racing de Santander in December of the following year until the end of the season.

Having been relatively used in a Cantabria side that achieved a first-ever qualification for the UEFA Cup – netting in a 2–0 away victory over Osasuna on 13 January 2008– Álvarez returned to Galicia and Deportivo. Scarcely played during 2008–09, he profited from a rare start to score the game's only goal at Athletic Bilbao, on 18 April 2009; he made his debut in European competition on 18 February that year, featuring the full 90 minutes of a 3–0 away loss against AaB in the UEFA Cup, and was sent off in the second leg in a 6–1 aggregate scoreline.

In summer 2012, aged 32, Álvarez joined second-division Lugo on a two-year contract, returning to the club after playing youth football there for nearly a decade. On 2 September 2014, he signed with Langreo in the third tier; however, only six months later, he moved abroad for the first time in his career, agreeing to a deal at New York City following a trial period.

== International career ==
Álvarez participated in the resurrection of the unofficial Galician national team in December 2005, playing their first game after 75 years against Uruguay.

== Honours ==
Deportivo

- Segunda División: 2011–12
