= Chus Bravo =

Spanish footballer

Personal information
- Full name: Jesús Manuel Bravo Suárez
- Date of birth: 3 May 1979 (age 47)
- Place of birth: Gijón, Spain
- Height: 1.86 m (6 ft 1 in)
- Position: Centre back

Youth career
- 1988–1994: Estudiantes
- 1994–1998: Sporting Gijón

Senior career*
Years	Team	Apps	(Gls)
1998–2001	Sporting Gijón B	42	(0)
1998–1999	→ Langreo (loan)	36	(2)
2001–2008	Sporting Gijón	79	(1)
2008–2009	Mérida	28	(2)
2009–2010	Cultural Leonesa	23	(1)
2010–2011	Caudal	15	(0)
Total		223	(6)
- * Club domestic league appearances and goals

Jesús Manuel 'Chus' Bravo Suárez (born 3 May 1979 in Gijón, Asturias) is a Spanish former footballer who played as a central defender.
