= Javi Fuego =

Spanish footballer (born 1984)

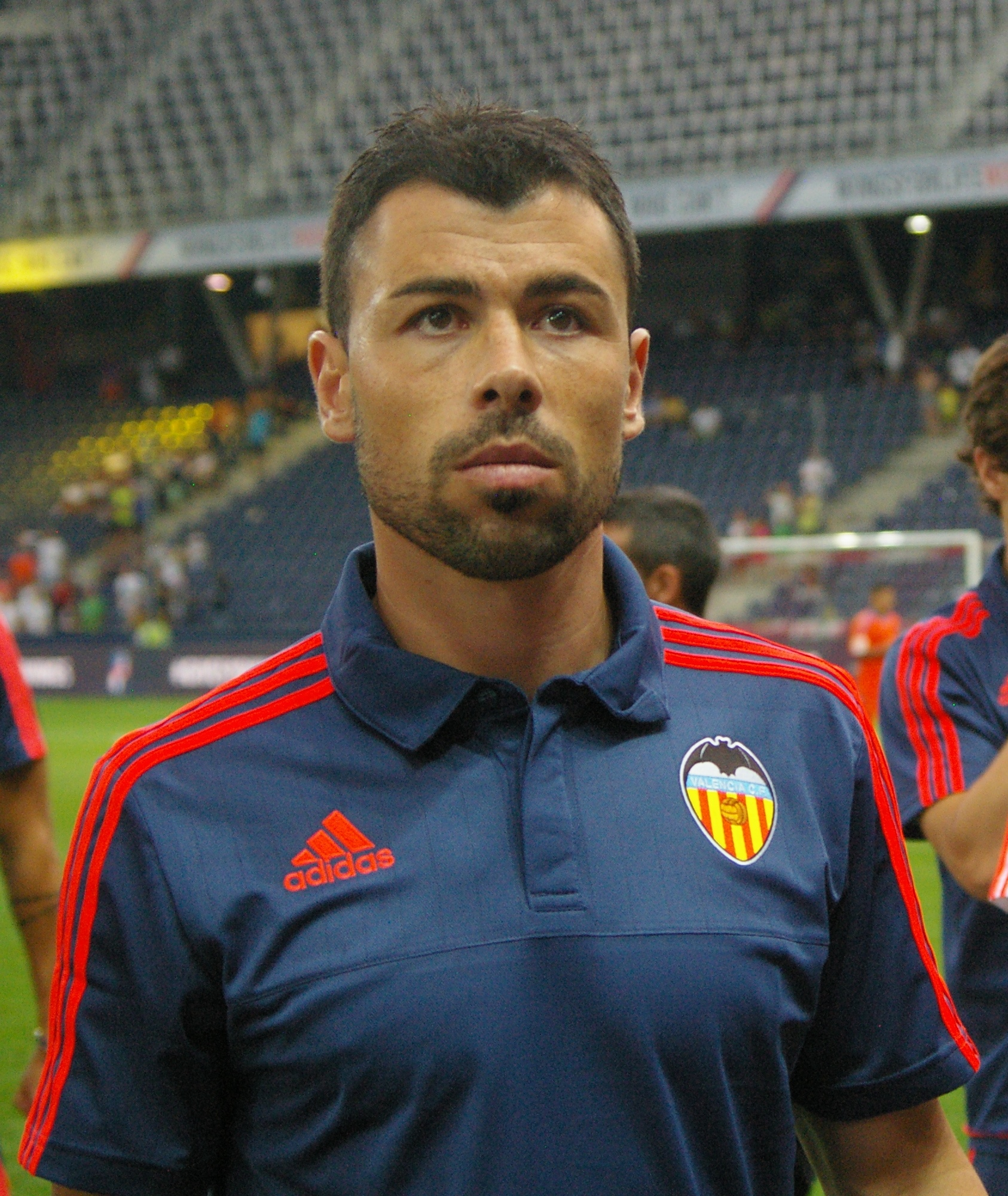
- Fuego as a Valencia player in 2015

Personal information
- Full name: Javier Fuego Martínez
- Date of birth: 4 January 1984 (age 42)
- Place of birth: Pola de Siero, Spain
- Height: 1.81 m (5 ft 11 1/2 in)
- Position: Defensive midfielder

Youth career
- Romanón
- 1993–2002: Sporting Gijón

Senior career*
Years	Team	Apps	(Gls)
2002–2007	Sporting Gijón	114	(4)
2002–2004	Sporting Gijón B	37	(3)
2007–2008	Levante	24	(1)
2008–2010	Recreativo	67	(6)
2010–2013	Rayo Vallecano	104	(1)
2013–2016	Valencia	88	(5)
2016–2018	Espanyol	48	(1)
2018–2019	Villarreal	16	(0)
2019–2021	Sporting Gijón	72	(0)
Total		570	(21)

International career
2002–2003	Spain U19	4	(0)
2003	Spain U20	1	(0)
2006	Spain U21	1	(0)
2005	Spain U23	5	(0)
- * Club domestic league appearances and goals

Javier "Javi" Fuego Martínez (Spanish pronunciation: [xaˈβjeɾ ˈxaβi ˈfweɣo maɾˈtineθ]; born 4 January 1984) is a Spanish former professional footballer who played as a defensive midfielder.

He appeared in 277 La Liga matches over ten seasons, totalling nine goals for Levante, Recreativo, Rayo Vallecano, Valencia, Espanyol and Villarreal. He added 256 games in the Segunda División, mainly in representation of Sporting de Gijón.

== Club career ==
=== Early years and Recreativo ===
Fuego was born in Pola de Siero, Asturias. He started playing professional football for Sporting de Gijón, representing the local side in six Segunda División seasons and being first choice from 2004 to 2007.

In the 2007–08 campaign, Fuego signed with La Liga strugglers Levante UD, but was one of many players to leave the squad upon relegation and serious financial problems. In August 2008, he signed a three-year deal worth €140.000 with Andalusia's Recreativo de Huelva, appearing regularly as a starter but being relegated from the top flight in his first year.

=== Rayo Vallecano ===
For 2010–11, Fuego joined Rayo Vallecano, quickly establishing himself as first choice for the Madrid club and helping it to a second-place finish and subsequent top-division promotion.

He rarely missed a match in his subsequent two-year spell in that tier, helping his team consecutively retain their status.

=== Valencia ===
In January 2013, months before the season was over, it was announced that Fuego would not renew his expiring contract with Rayo, agreeing to a three-year deal with fellow league club Valencia CF as of 1 July. He made his official debut on 17 August, playing the full 90 minutes in a 1–0 home win against Málaga CF.

Fuego scored the first brace of his professional career on 23 March 2014, netting both of his team's goals in a 2–1 victory over Villarreal CF also at the Mestalla Stadium. On 1 April 2015, he renewed his link until 30 June 2017 with the option of a further season.

Fuego played seven games in the 2015–16 UEFA Champions League in a group-stage exit, the first being a 3–1 home defeat of AS Monaco FC in the play-off round where he came on as a second-half substitute for Paco Alcácer.

=== Espanyol ===
On 13 August 2016, Fuego signed a three-year contract with RCD Espanyol. He started in 29 of his 31 league appearances in his first season, scoring once in an eventual eighth-place finish.

=== Villarreal ===
On 30 January 2018, aged 34, Fuego joined Villarreal on a two-and-a-half-year deal. He featured rarely during his spell in the Valencian Community, due to injuries and a bacterial infection.

=== Return to Sporting ===
Fuego returned to first club Sporting on 26 June 2019, after agreeing to a two-year contract. He announced his retirement on 23 July 2021.

== Honours ==
Spain U23

- Mediterranean Games: 2005
