= Estadio Municipal Santo Domingo =

Multi-use stadium in El Ejido, Spain

Coordinates: 36°45′51.08″N 2°48′01.78″W

Santo Domingo
- Interactive map of Santo Domingo
- Full name: Estadio Municipal de Santo Domingo
- Location: El Ejido, Spain
- Capacity: 7,870
- Surface: Grass
- Field size: 105 m × 68 m (344 ft × 223 ft)

Construction
- Opened: 2001

Tenant
- CD El Ejido

The Estadio Municipal de Santo Domingo is a multi-use stadium in El Ejido, Spain. It is currently used mostly for football matches and is the current home ground to Segunda B football team, Club Deportivo El Ejido since 2012. It was the home ground of the now-defunct Polideportivo Ejido. The stadium holds 7,870 (all-seated) and was built in 2001.
