= Gerardo Noriega =

Spanish footballer

Gerardo
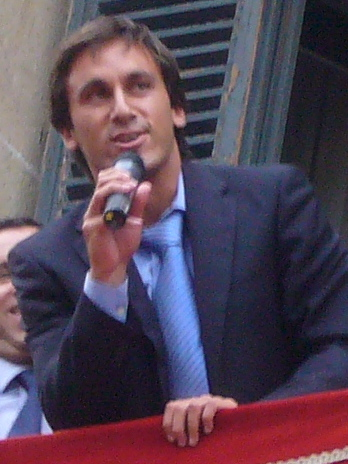
- Gerardo celebrates promotion to La Liga with Hércules in 2010

Personal information
- Full name: Gerardo Antonio Noriega Santoveña
- Date of birth: 10 March 1982 (age 44)
- Place of birth: Llanes, Spain
- Height: 1.73 m (5 ft 8 in)
- Position: Midfielder

Youth career
- 1995–1997: Llanes
- 1997–2000: Sporting Gijón

Senior career*
| Years | Team | Apps | (Gls) |
| 1999–2003 | Sporting Gijón B | 101 | (15) |
| 2002–2007 | Sporting Gijón | 108 | (9) |
| 2007–2008 | Poli Ejido | 29 | (3) |
| 2008–2010 | Hércules | 18 | (0) |
| 2010–2011 | Gimnàstic | 24 | (0) |
| 2012–2015 | Avilés | 68 | (4) |
| 2015–2016 | Urraca | 12 | (0) |
| 2016 | Niki Volos | | |
| 2016 | Urraca | 1 | (0) |
| 2016–2017 | Gimnástica | 18 | (5) |
| Total | | 379 | (36) |
- * Club domestic league appearances and goals

Gerardo Antonio Noriega Santoveña (born 10 March 1982 in Llanes, Asturias), known simply as Gerardo, is a Spanish former professional footballer who played as a right midfielder.
