= 1977–78 FC Barcelona season =

79th season in existence of FC Barcelona

FC Barcelona
1977–78 season
- President: Agustí Montal Costa (until 18 December 1977); Raimon Carrasco
- Manager: Rinus Michels
- La Liga: Second
- Copa del Rey: Winners
- UEFA Cup: Semi-final
- Joan Gamper Trophy: Winners
Home colours	Away colours

The 1977–78 season was the 79th season for FC Barcelona.

== Squad ==
Note: Flags indicate national team as defined under FIFA eligibility rules; some limited exceptions apply. Players may hold more than one non-FIFA nationality.

No.	Pos.	Nation	Player
—	GK	ESP	Pedro María Artola
—	GK	ESP	Pere Valentí Mora
—	GK	ESP	Andreu Blay
—	DF	ESP	Jesús Antonio de la Cruz
—	DF	ESP	Antoni Olmo
—	DF	ESP	Migueli
—	DF	ESP	Pepito Ramos
—	DF	ESP	Quique Costas
—	DF	ESP	Juanjo Enríquez
—	MF	ESP	Juan Manuel Asensi
—	MF	ESP	Tente Sánchez
—	MF	ESP	Jordi Carreño
—	MF	ESP	Joan Vilà

No.	Pos.	Nation	Player
—	MF	NED	Johan Neeskens
—	MF	ESP	Esteban Vigo
—	MF	ESP	José Cirilo Macizo
—	MF	URU	Alfredo Amarillo
—	MF	ESP	Paco Martínez
—	FW	ARG	Rafael Zuviría
—	FW	NED	Johan Cruyff
—	FW	ESP	Carles Rexach
—	FW	ESP	Manuel Clares
—	FW	ESP	Paco Fortes
—	FW	ARG	Juan Carlos Heredia
—	FW	BRA	Williams Silvio Modesto Bio
—	FW	ESP	José Botella
—	FW	ESP	Miquel Mir

== Competitions ==
=== Friendlies ===
26 July 1977	Hamburger SV (West Germany)	6-0	(Spain) FC Barcelona

02 August 1977	VV Noordwijk (Netherlands)	0-2	FC Barcelona

03 August 1977	HABE	1-7	FC Barcelona

05 August 1977 Amsterdam Tournament	AZ Alkmaar (Netherlands)	4-0	(Spain) FC Barcelona

07 August 1977 Amsterdam Tournament	Liverpool FC (England)	1-0	(Spain) FC Barcelona	Liverpool
				Stadium: Anfield Road

14 August 1977 Trofeo Costa del Sol	FC Barcelona (Spain)	1-0	(Brazil) America RJ	Málaga
				Stadium: Estadio La Rosaleda

15 August 1977 Trofeo Costa del Sol	CD Málaga	0-3	FC Barcelona	Málaga
				Stadium: Estadio La Rosaleda

19 August 1977	Sabadell	1-2	FC Barcelona

23 August 1977 Joan Gamper Trophy	FC Barcelona (Spain)	3-1	(Czech Republic) Slovan Bratislava	Barcelona
				Stadium: Camp Nou

24 August 1977 Joan Gamper Trophy	FC Barcelona (Spain)	4-1	(West Germany) Schalke 04	Barcelona
				Stadium: Camp Nou

28 August 1977	AC Milan (Italy)	2-1	(Spain) FC Barcelona

12 October 1977	REUS-	0-1	FC Barcelona

25 May 1978	SSC Napoli (Italy)	1-1	(Spain) FC Barcelona

27 May 1978	FC Barcelona	3-1	(Netherlands) Ajax Amsterdam	Barcelona
				Stadium: Camp Nou

=== Primera Division ===
==== League table ====
Pos	Team	Pld	W	D	L	GF	GA	GD	Pts	Qualification or relegation
1	Real Madrid (C)	34	22	3	9	77	40	+37	47	Qualification for the European Cup first round
2	Barcelona	34	16	9	9	49	29	+20	41	Qualification for the Cup Winners' Cup first round (Note: Barcelona qualified to the Cup Winners' Cup as winners of the Copa del Rey.)
3	Athletic Bilbao	34	16	8	10	62	36	+26	40	Qualification for the UEFA Cup first round
4	Valencia	34	16	7	11	54	33	+21	39	Qualification for the UEFA Cup first round
5	Sporting Gijón	34	15	9	10	53	43	+10	39	Qualification for the UEFA Cup first round

Source: BDFútbol
Rules for classification: 1) Points; 2) Head-to-head results; 3) Goal difference; 4) Number of goals scored
(C) Champions

==== Position by round ====
Round	1	2	3	4	5	6	7	8	9	10	11	12	13	14	15	16	17	18	19	20	21	22	23	24	25	26	27	28	29	30	31	32	33	34
Ground	H	A	H	A	H	A	A	H	A	H	A	H	A	H	A	H	A	A	H	A	H	A	H	H	A	H	A	H	A	H	A	H	A	H
Result	W	D	D	W	W	W	L	W	W	W	D	L	D	W	W	D	W	W	W	W	L	D	D	W	D	W	L	D	L	W	L	W	L	W
Position	7	2	4	2	2	2	2	2	2	2	2	2	3	2	2	2	2	2	2	2	2	2	2	2	2	2	2	2	2	2	2	2	3	2

Source: www.lfp.es
A = Away; H = Home; W = Win; D = Draw; L = Loss; = 1978–79 European Cup; = 1978–79 UEFA Cup; = 1978–79 Segunda Division

==== Matches ====
04 September 1977 1	FC Barcelona	1-0	Real Sociedad	Barcelona
				Stadium: Camp Nou

10 September 1977 2	Real Betis	0-0	FC Barcelona	Seville
				Stadium: Benito Villamarin

18 September 1977 3	Athletic Bilbao	0-0	FC Barcelona	Bilbao
				Stadium: San Mamés

25 September 1977 4	FC Barcelona	1-0	Atlético Madrid	Barcelona
				Stadium: Camp Nou

02 October 1977 5	Cádiz CF	0-2	FC Barcelona	Cádiz
				Stadium: Ramón de Carranza

09 October 1977 6	FC Barcelona	3-0	Racing Santander	Barcelona
				Stadium: Camp Nou

18 October 1977 7	Hercules CF	2-1	FC Barcelona	Alicante

30 October 1977 8	FC Barcelona	5-0	UD Las Palmas	Barcelona
				Stadium: Camp Nou

06 November 1977 9	UD Salamanca	1-0	FC Barcelona	Villares de la Reina
				Stadium: Helmántico

13 November 1977 10	FC Barcelona	3-1	Sevilla CF	Barcelona
				Stadium: Camp Nou

20 November 1977 11	Español	1-1	FC Barcelona	Barcelona
				Stadium: Sarriá

04 December 1977 12	FC Barcelona	2-3	Real Madrid	Barcelona
				Stadium: Camp Nou

11 December 1977 13	Burgos CF	1-1	FC Barcelona	Burgos

18 December 1977 14	FC Barcelona	1-0	Sporting de Gijón	Barcelona
				Stadium: Camp Nou

01 January 1978 15	Elche CF	1-3	FC Barcelona	Elche

08 January 1978 16	FC Barcelona	1-1	Rayo Vallecano	Barcelona
				Stadium: Camp Nou

15 January 1978 17	Valencia CF	1-0	FC Barcelona	Valencia
				Stadium: Luis Casanova

22 January 1978 18	Real Sociedad	1-2	FC Barcelona	San Sebastián
				Stadium: Atotxa

29 January 1978 19	FC Barcelona	1-0	Real Betis	Barcelona
				Stadium: Camp Nou

05 February 1978 20	FC Barcelona	3-1	Athletic Bilbao	Barcelona
				Stadium: Camp Nou

12 February 1978 21	Atlético Madrid	1-0	FC Barcelona	Madrid
				Stadium: Vicente Calderon

19 February 1978 22	FC Barcelona	1-1	Cádiz CF	Barcelona
				Stadium: Camp Nou

26 February 1978 23	Racing Santander	0-0	FC Barcelona	Santander
				Stadium: El Sardinero

05 March 1978 24	FC Barcelona	2-1	Hercules CF	Barcelona
				Stadium: Camp Nou

12 March 1978 25	UD Las Palmas	0-0	FC Barcelona	Las Palmas
				Stadium: Insular

19 March 1978 26	FC Barcelona	3-1	UD Salamanca	Barcelona
				Stadium: Camp Nou

26 March 1978 27	Sevilla CF	2-1	FC Barcelona	Seville
				Stadium: Ramón Sánchez-Pizjuán Stadium

01 April 1978 28	FC Barcelona	1-1	Español	Barcelona
				Stadium: Camp Nou

05 April 1978 29	Real Madrid	4-0	FC Barcelona	Madrid
				Stadium: Santiago Bernabeu

08 April 1978 30	FC Barcelona	3-0	Burgos	Barcelona
				Stadium: Camp Nou

16 April 1978 31	Sporting de Gijón	1-0	FC Barcelona	Gijón
				Stadium: El Molinon

23 April 1978 32	FC Barcelona	5-1	Elche	Barcelona
				Stadium: Camp Nou

30 April 1978 33	Rayo Vallecano	2-1	FC Barcelona	Madrid
				Stadium: Vallecas

07 May 1978 34	FC Barcelona	1-0	Valencia CF	Barcelona
				Stadium: Camp Nou

=== UEFA Cup ===
==== First round ====
14 September 1977	FC Barcelona (Spain)	5–1	(Romania) Steaua București	Barcelona
	Heredia 4', 30'; Cruyff 5' (pen.); Clares 63'; Zuviría 82'	Report	Năstase 72'	Stadium: Camp Nou; Attendance: 68,000; Referee: Ernst Dörflinger (Switzerland)

28 September 1977	Steaua București (Romania)	1–3	(Spain) FC Barcelona	Bucharest
	Dumitru 36' (pen.)	Report	Cruyff 23'; Asensi 76'; Sánchez 90'	Stadium: Stadionul Steaua; Attendance: 18,500; Referee: Domenico Serafino (Italy)

==== Second round ====
19 October 1977	AZ Alkmaar (Netherlands)	1–1	(Spain) FC Barcelona	Alkmaar
	Nygaard 41'	Report	46' Neeskens	Stadium: Alkmaarderhout; Attendance: 20,019; Referee: Walter Eschweiler (West Germany)

2 November 1977	FC Barcelona (Spain)	1–1 (a.e.t.) (5–4 p)	(Netherlands) AZ Alkmaar	Barcelona
	Rexach 32' (pen.)	Report	Kist 69'	Stadium: Camp Nou; Attendance: 53,000; Referee: John Wright Paterson (Scotland)
	Penalties
	Rexach (penalty scored); Asensi (penalty scored); Olmo (penalty scored); Amarillo (penalty scored); Cruyff (penalty scored)		(penalty scored) Metgod; (penalty scored) Kist; (penalty missed) Nygaard; (penalty scored) Arntz; (penalty scored) Spelbos

==== Eightfinals ====
23 November 1977	Ipswich Town (England)	3–0	(Spain) FC Barcelona	Ipswich
	Gates 17'; Whymark 61'; Talbot 77'	Report		Stadium: Portman Road; Attendance: 33,663; Referee: Adolf Prokop (East Germany)

7 December 1977	FC Barcelona (Spain)	3–0 (a.e.t.) (3–1 p)	(England) Ipswich Town	Camp Nou, Barcelona
	Cruyff 20', 47'; Rexach 87' (pen.)	Report		Attendance: 45,000; Referee: Erich Linemayr (Austria)
	Penalties
	Rexach (penalty scored); Asensi (penalty scored); Olmo (penalty missed); Amarillo (penalty scored)		(penalty missed) Talbot; (penalty missed) Viljoen; (penalty scored) Mills; (penalty missed) Woods

==== Quarterfinals ====
1 March 1978	Aston Villa (England)	2–2	(Spain) FC Barcelona	Villa Park, Birmingham
	McNaught 87'; Deehan 89'	Report	Cruyff 20'; Zuviría 80'	Attendance: 46,619; Referee: César Correia (Portugal)

15 March 1978	FC Barcelona (Spain)	2–1	(England) Aston Villa	Camp Nou, Barcelona
	Migueli 67'; Asensi 77'	Report	Little 57'	Attendance: 90,000; Referee: Doğan Babacan (Turkey)

==== Semifinals ====
29 March 1978	PSV Eindhoven (Netherlands)	3–0	(Spain) Barcelona	Eindhoven
	Olmo 9' (o.g.); Lubse 21'; Postuma 70'	Report		Stadium: Philips Stadion; Attendance: 27,000; Referee: Sergio Gonella (Italy)

12 April 1978	FC Barcelona (Spain)	3–1 (3–4 agg.)	(Netherlands) PSV Eindhoven	Barcelona
	Rexach 9' (pen.), 66' (pen.); Fortes 19'	Report	47' Deacy	Stadium: Camp Nou; Attendance: 65,000; Referee: Robert Wurtz (France)

=== Copa del Rey ===
==== Eightfinals ====
18 January 1978	Getafe	3-3	FC Barcelona

08 February 1978	FC Barcelona	8-0	Getafe	Barcelona
				Stadium: Camp Nou

==== Quarterfinals ====
15 February 1978	Deportivo Alaves	1-0	FC Barcelona

22 February 1978	FC Barcelona	2-0	Deportivo Alaves	Barcelona
				Stadium: Camp Nou

==== Semifinals ====
08 March 1978	Real Sociedad	0-0	FC Barcelona

22 March 1978	FC Barcelona	2-1	Real Sociedad	Barcelona
				Stadium: Camp Nou

==== Final ====
19 April 1978	FC Barcelona	3-1	UD Las Palmas	Barcelona
				Stadium: Camp Nou

== Statistics ==
=== Players statistics ===
No.	Pos	Nat	Player	Total		Liga		UEFA		Copa	
No.	Pos	Nat	Player	Apps	Goals	Apps	Goals	Apps	Goals	Apps	Goals
	GK	(Spain) ESP	Pedro María Artola	44	-43	29	-25	9	-13	6	-5
	DF	(Spain) ESP	Jesús Antonio de la Cruz	50	2	34	2	9	0	7	0
	DF	(Spain) ESP	Antoni Olmo	50	2	34	2	10	0	6	0
	DF	(Spain) ESP	Migueli	49	4	33	2	10	1	6	1
	DF	(Spain) ESP	Pepito Ramos	36	0	24	0	6	0	6	0
	MF	(Netherlands) NED	Johan Neeskens	27	3	17+1	2	6+1	1	2	0
	MF	(Spain) ESP	Tente Sánchez	37	2	23+2	1	6+1	1	4+1	0
	MF	(Spain) ESP	Juan Manuel Asensi	48	17	32	9	10	2	6	6
	FW	(Argentina) ARG	Rafael Zuviría	48	11	31+2	6	9	2	6	3
	FW	(Netherlands) NED	Johan Cruyff	42	11	25	5	10	5	7	1
	FW	(Spain) ESP	Carles Rexach	35	18	22	9	6+1	4	6	5
	GK	(Spain) ESP	Pere Valentí Mora	7	-6	5	-4	1	-1	1	-1
	FW	(Spain) ESP	Paco Fortes	27	5	12+5	2	5	1	5	2
	DF	(Spain) ESP	Quique Costas	21	2	11+4	2	1+1	0	4	0
	FW	(Argentina) ARG	Juan Carlos Heredia	15	4	10	2	5	2	0	0
	MF	(Spain) ESP	Esteban Vigo	17	1	9+4	1	1+2	0	1+0	0
	FW	(Spain) ESP	Manuel Clares	24	2	8+10	1	1+3	1	0+2	0
	DF	(Spain) ESP	Juanjo	20	0	5+8	0	1+4	0	1+1	0
	FW	(Brazil) BRA	Williams Silvio Modesto Bio	5	3	4+1	3	0	0	0	0
	MF	(Spain) ESP	Joan Vilà	5	0	2+3	0	0	0	0	0
	MF	(Spain) ESP	José Cirilo Macizo	10	0	2+2	0	2+1	0	1+2	0
	MF	(Uruguay) URU	Alfredo Amarillo	9	0	1+2	0	2+1	0	1+2	0
	MF	(Spain) ESP	Jordi Carreño	12	0	1+4	0	0+2	0	1+4	0
	FW	(Spain) ESP	Miquel Mir	1	0	0	0	0+1	0	0	0
	GK	(Spain) ESP	Andreu Blay								
	MF	(Spain) ESP	Paco Martínez								
	FW	(Spain) ESP	José Botella								
