= 1976–77 FC Barcelona season =

78th season in existence of FC Barcelona

FC Barcelona
1976–77 season
- President: Agustí Montal Costa
- Manager: Rinus Michels
- La Liga: 2nd
- Copa del Rey: Round of 16
- UEFA Cup: Quarter-final
- Joan Gamper Trophy: Winners
Home colours	Away colours

The 1976–77 season was the 78th season for FC Barcelona.

== Squad ==
Note: Flags indicate national team as defined under FIFA eligibility rules; some limited exceptions apply. Players may hold more than one non-FIFA nationality.

No.	Pos.	Nation	Player
—	GK	ESP	Pere Valentí Mora
—	GK	ESP	Pedro María Artola
—	DF	ESP	Pepito Ramos
—	DF	ESP	Antoni Olmo
—	DF	ESP	Migueli
—	DF	ESP	Enrique Álvarez Costas
—	DF	ESP	Jesús Antonio de la Cruz
—	DF	ESP	José Joaquín Albaladejo
—	MF	NED	Johan Neeskens
—	MF	ESP	Juan Manuel Asensi
—	MF	URU	Alfredo Amarillo

No.	Pos.	Nation	Player
—	MF	ESP	Tente Sánchez
—	MF	ESP	Marcial Pina
—	MF	ESP	José Cirilo Macizo
—	MF	ESP	Jordi Carreño
—	MF	ESP	Manuel Tomé
—	MF	ESP	Paco Martínez
—	MF	ESP	Manuel Clares
—	FW	NED	Johan Cruyff
—	FW	ARG	Juan Carlos Heredia
—	FW	ESP	Carles Rexach
—	FW	PER	Hugo Sotil
—	FW	ESP	Miquel Mir
—	FW	ESP	José Botella

== Competitions ==
=== Friendlies ===
04 August 1976	SBV Vitesse (Netherlands)	0-2	(Spain) FC Barcelona	Arnhem

07 August 1976	VVV-Venlo (Netherlands)	1-2	(Spain) FC Barcelona	Venlo

10 August 1976	MSV Duisburg (West Germany)	2-0	(Spain) FC Barcelona	Duisburg

13 August 1976 Palma Trophy	FC Barcelona (Spain)	2-1	(England) Queens Park Rangers	Palma de Mallorca
				Stadium: Son Moix

14 August 1976 Palma Trophy	FC Barcelona (Spain)	2-2	(Soviet Union) FC Spartak Moscow	Palma de Mallorca
				Stadium: Son Moix

24 August 1976 Joan Gamper Trophy	FC Barcelona (Spain)	2-1	(Czech Republic) AC Sparta Prague

25 August 1976 Joan Gamper Trophy	FC Barcelona (Spain)	2-0	(West Germany) Eintracht Frankfurt	Barcelona
				Stadium: Camp Nou

28 August 1976	IRUN	1-4	FC Barcelona

01 September 1976	FC Barcelona (Spain)	2-0	(France) Stade Reims	Barcelona
				Stadium: Camp Nou

19 April 1977	Paris Saint-Germain (France)	1-1	FC Barcelona

17 June 1977 Badajoz Trophy	CD Badajoz	1-5	Barcelona	Badajoz
				Stadium: Nuevo Vivero

19 June 1977 Badajoz Trophy	Ferencvarosi TC (Hungary)	0-3	(Spain) FC Barcelona	Badajoz
				Stadium: Nuevo Vivero

=== Primera Division ===
==== League table ====
Pos	Team	Pld	W	D	L	GF	GA	GD	Pts	Qualification or relegation
1	Atlético Madrid (C)	34	19	8	7	62	33	+29	46	Qualification for the European Cup first round
2	Barcelona	34	18	9	7	69	34	+35	45	Qualification for the UEFA Cup first round
3	Athletic Bilbao	34	15	8	11	55	45	+10	38	Qualification for the UEFA Cup first round
4	Las Palmas	34	15	6	13	56	51	+5	36	Qualification for the UEFA Cup first round
5	Real Betis	34	15	6	13	42	42	0	36	Qualification for the Cup Winners' Cup first round (Note: Real Betis qualified to the Cup Winners' Cup as winners of the Copa del Rey.)

Source: BDFútbol
Rules for classification: 1) Points; 2) Head-to-head results; 3) Goal difference; 4) Number of goals scored
(C) Champions

==== Position by round ====
Round	1	2	3	4	5	6	7	8	9	10	11	12	13	14	15	16	17	18	19	20	21	22	23	24	25	26	27	28	29	30	31	32	33	34
Ground	H	A	H	A	H	A	A	H	A	H	A	H	A	H	A	H	A	A	H	A	H	A	H	H	A	H	A	H	A	H	A	H	A	H
Result	W	L	W	L	W	W	L	D	W	W	D	W	D	W	W	W	W	L	W	D	W	L	L	D	L	D	L	W	W	W	D	W	D	W
Position	1	5	4	6	3	1	6	4	3	2	3	1	1	1	1	1	1	1	1	1	1	2	2	2	2	2	2	2	2	2	2	2	2	2

Source: www.lfp.es
A = Away; H = Home; W = Win; D = Draw; L = Loss; = 1977–78 European Cup; = 1977–78 UEFA Cup; = 1977–78 Segunda Division

==== Matches ====
05 September 1976 1	FC Barcelona	4-0	UD Las Palmas	Barcelona
				Stadium: Camp Nou

12 September 1976 2	Racing Santander	1-0	FC Barcelona	Santander
				Stadium: El Sardinero

19 September 1976 3	FC Barcelona	3-1	Real Madrid	Barcelona
				Stadium: Camp Nou

25 September 1976 4	CD Málaga	1-0	FC Barcelona	Málaga
				Stadium: La Rosaleda

03 October 1976 5	FC Barcelona	4-1	UD Salamanca	Barcelona
				Stadium: Camp Nou

16 October 1976 6	Athletic Bilbao	1-3	FC Barcelona	Bilbao
				Stadium: San Mamés

24 October 1976 7	Atlético Madrid	3-1	FC Barcelona	Madrid
				Stadium: Vicente Calderon

31 October 1976 8	FC Barcelona	1-1	Hercules CF	Barcelona
				Stadium: Camp Nou

07 November 1976 9	Sevilla FC	0-1	FC Barcelona	Sevilla
				Stadium: Sanchez Pizjuan

14 November 1976 10	FC Barcelona	3-0	Burgos CF	Barcelona
				Stadium: Camp Nou

21 November 1976 11	Real Zaragoza	0-0	FC Barcelona	Zaragoza
				Stadium: La Romareda

28 November 1976 12	FC Barcelona	6-1	Valencia CF	Barcelona
				Stadium: Camp Nou

05 December 1976 13	Celta Vigo	0-0	FC Barcelona	Vigo
				Stadium: Balaidos

12 December 1976 14	FC Barcelona	2-1	Real Sociedad	Barcelona
				Stadium: Camp Nou

19 December 1976 15	Español	2-3	FC Barcelona	Barcelona
				Stadium: Sarriá

02 January 1977 16	FC Barcelona	4-1	Elche CF	Barcelona
				Stadium: Camp Nou

09 January 1977 17	Real Betis	1-3	FC Barcelona	Sevilla
				Stadium: Benito Villamarin

15 January 1977 18	UD Las Palmas	2-1	FC Barcelona	Las Palmas
				Stadium: Insular

23 January 1977 19	FC Barcelona	7-0	Racing Santander	Barcelona
				Stadium: Camp Nou

30 January 1977 20	Real Madrid	1-1	FC Barcelona	Madrid
				Stadium: Santiago Bernabeu

06 February 1977 21	FC Barcelona	2-1	CD Málaga	Barcelona
				Stadium: Camp Nou

13 February 1977 22	UD Salamanca	2-0	FC Barcelona	Villares de la Reina
				Stadium: El Helmántico

20 February 1977 23	FC Barcelona	0-2	Athletic Bilbao	Barcelona
				Stadium: Camp Nou

26 February 1977 24	FC Barcelona	1-1	Atlético Madrid	Barcelona
				Stadium: Camp Nou

06 March 1977 25	Hercules CF	3-2	FC Barcelona	Alicante
				Stadium: José Rico Pérez

13 March 1977 26	FC Barcelona	3-3	Sevilla CF	Barcelona
				Stadium: Camp Nou

20 March 1977 27	Burgos CF	1-0	FC Barcelona	Burgos
				Stadium: El Plantio

03 April 1977 28	FC Barcelona	2-1	Real Zaragoza	Barcelona
				Stadium: Camp Nou

10 April 1977 29	Valencia CF	0-1	FC Barcelona	Valencia
				Stadium: Mestalla

24 April 1977 30	FC Barcelona	4-0	Celta Vigo	Barcelona
				Stadium: Camp Nou

01 May 1977 31	Real Sociedad	0-0	FC Barcelona	San Sebastián
				Stadium: Atotxa

08 May 1977 32	FC Barcelona	4-2	Español	Barcelona
				Stadium: Camp Nou

15 May 1977 33	Elche CF	0-0	FC Barcelona	Elche
				Stadium: Altabix

22 May 1977 34	FC Barcelona	3-1	Real Betis	Barcelona
				Stadium: Camp Nou

=== UEFA Cup ===
==== First round ====
15 September 1976	C.F. Os Belenenses (Portugal)	2-2	(Spain) FC Barcelona

29 September 1976	FC Barcelona (Spain)	3-2	C.F. Os Belenenses	Barcelona
				Stadium: Camp Nou

==== Round of 32 ====
20 October 1976 1	FC Barcelona (Spain)	2-0	(Belgium) Lokeren	Barcelona
				Stadium: Camp Nou

04 November 1976 2	Lokeren (Belgium)	2-1	(Spain) FC Barcelona

==== Eightfinals ====
24 November 1976 1	Oesters (Sweden)	0-3	(Spain) FC Barcelona

08 December 1976 2	FC Barcelona (Spain)	5-1	(Sweden) Oesters	Barcelona
				Stadium: Camp Nou

==== Quarterfinals ====
02 March 1977 1	Athletic Bilbao (Spain)	2-1	(Spain) FC Barcelona

16 March 1977 2	Barcelona (Spain)	2-2	(Spain) Athletic Bilbao	Barcelona
				Stadium: Camp Nou

=== Copa del Rey ===
==== Eightfinals ====
27 April 1977 1	Celta Vigo	1-1	FC Barcelona	Vigo
				Stadium: Balaidos

19 May 1977 2	FC Barcelona	1-2	Celta Vigo	Barcelona
				Stadium: Camp Nou

== Statistics ==
=== Players statistics ===
No.	Pos	Nat	Player	Total		Liga		UEFA		Copa	
No.	Pos	Nat	Player	Apps	Goals	Apps	Goals	Apps	Goals	Apps	Goals
1	GK	(Spain) ESP	Pere Valentí Mora	33	-38	26	-29	7	-9	0	-0
2	DF	(Spain) ESP	Pepito Ramos	40	0	29+1	0	8	0	2	0
3	DF	(Spain) ESP	Migueli	33	1	24+1	1	7	0	1	0
12	DF	(Spain) ESP	Quique Costas	26	0	18+3	0	3+1	0	1	0
4	DF	(Spain) ESP	Antoni Olmo	42	1	27+5	1	6+2	0	2	0
6	MF	(Netherlands) NED	Johan Neeskens	41	9	33	8	8	1	0	0
5	MF	(Uruguay) URU	Alfredo Amarillo	33	3	23+2	2	7	0	0+1	1
8	MF	(Spain) ESP	Tente Sánchez	33	1	23+3	1	4+1	0	2	0
10	MF	(Spain) ESP	Juan Manuel Asensi	44	11	34	7	8	4	2	0
9	FW	(Netherlands) NED	Johan Cruyff	36	18	29	13	7	5	0	0
11	FW	(Spain) ESP	Manuel Clares	42	27	29+3	22	7+1	5	2	0
13	GK	(Spain) ESP	Pedro María Artola	12	-10	8+1	-5	1	-2	2	-3
15	MF	(Spain) ESP	Marcial Pina	22	3	14+4	3	2+2	0	0	0
16	FW	(Argentina) ARG	Juan Carlos Heredia	21	9	14+1	6	3+1	3	2	0
7	FW	(Spain) ESP	Carles Rexach	19	1	11+3	0	5	1	0	0
5	DF	(Spain) ESP	Jesús Antonio de la Cruz	14	0	10+1	0	1	0	2	0
14	MF	(Spain) ESP	José Cirilo Macizo	21	0	9+8	0	2+2	0	0	0
15	MF	(Spain) ESP	Jordi Carreño	12	1	6+3	1	0+1	0	2	0
16	FW	(Peru) PER	Hugo Sotil	8	1	4+1	1	2+1	0	0	0
	FW	(Spain) ESP	Miquel Mir	5	0	2+2	0	0	0	0+1	0
	FW	(Spain) ESP	José Botella	4	2	1+1	2	0	0	2	0
	DF	(Spain) ESP	José Joaquín Albaladejo	1	0	0	0	0	0	0+1	0
