= 1978–79 FC Barcelona season =

80th season in existence of FC Barcelona

FC Barcelona
1978–79 season
- President: Josep Lluís Núñez
- Manager: Lucien Muller (until 20 April 1979); Joaquim Rifé
- La Liga: 5th
- Copa del Rey: Round of 16
- Cup Winners' Cup: Winners
- Joan Gamper Trophy: Third
- Top goalscorer: League: Hans Krankl (29 goals); All: Hans Krankl (36 goals)

The 1978–79 season was the 80th season for FC Barcelona.

== Squad ==
Note: Flags indicate national team as defined under FIFA eligibility rules; some limited exceptions apply. Players may hold more than one non-FIFA nationality.

No.	Pos.	Nation	Player
—	GK	(Spain) ESP	Pello Artola
—	GK	(Spain) ESP	Pere Valentí Mora
—	DF	(Spain) ESP	Migueli
—	DF	(Spain) ESP	Pepito Ramos
—	DF	(Spain) ESP	José Joaquín Aldabalejo
—	DF	(Spain) ESP	Esteban Vigo
—	DF	(Spain) ESP	Antonio Olmo
—	DF	(Spain) ESP	Antonio de la Cruz
—	DF	(Spain) ESP	Manolo
—	MF	(Spain) ESP	Félix Palomares
—	MF	(Spain) ESP	Joan Vilà
—	MF	(Spain) ESP	Quique Costas

No.	Pos.	Nation	Player
—	MF	(Netherlands) NED	Johan Neeskens
—	MF	(Spain) ESP	Isidre Tarrés
—	MF	(Spain) ESP	Tente Sánchez
—	MF	(Spain) ESP	Paco Martínez
—	MF	(Spain) ESP	Asensi
—	FW	(Brazil) BRA	Bio
—	FW	(Spain) ESP	Paco Fortes
—	FW	(Argentina) ARG	Zuvíria
—	FW	(Spain) ESP	Lobo Carrasco
—	FW	(Spain) ESP	Carles Rexach
—	FW	(Spain) ESP	Juan Carlos Heredia
—	FW	(Austria) AUT	Hans Krankl

=== La Liga ===
==== League table ====
Pos	Team	Pld	W	D	L	GF	GA	GD	Pts	Qualification or relegation
3	Atlético Madrid	34	14	13	7	55	37	+18	41	Qualification for the UEFA Cup first round
4	Real Sociedad	34	18	5	11	53	36	+17	41	Qualification for the UEFA Cup first round
5	Barcelona	34	16	6	12	69	37	+32	38	Qualification for the Cup Winners' Cup first round (Note: Valencia qualified to the Cup Winners' Cup as winners of the Copa del Rey and Barcelona as title holders of the competition.)
6	Las Palmas	34	14	9	11	49	43	+6	37	
7	Valencia	34	14	7	13	44	39	+5	35	Qualification for the Cup Winners' Cup first round

Source: BDFútbol
Rules for classification: 1) Points; 2) Head-to-head results; 3) Goal difference; 4) Number of goals scored

== Results ==
GAMES
30-07-78 . 700 INDEPENDENCE TROPHY ANDORRA-BARCELONA 0–2

3-08-78 . TROFEO COSTA BRAVA GIRONA-BARCELONA 0–4

5-08-78 . TROFEO COSTA BRAVA BARCELONA-BETIS 0-0 /5-4/ PENALTY

8-08-78 . FRIENDLY BEZIERS-BARCELONA 2–2

10-08-78 . FRIENDLY TARRAGONA-BARCELONA 1–2

13-08-78 . FRIENDLY BASTIA-BARCELONA 0-0 COIN TOSS BASTIA WON

15-08-78 . FRIENDLY LLEIDA-BARCELONA 0–3

18-08-78 . Festa d'Elx Trophy ELCHE-BARCELONA 1-1 /4-3/ PENALTY

22-08-78 . Joan Gamper Trophy BARCELONA-RAPID WIEN 0–1

23-08-78 . Joan Gamper Trophy BARCELONA-BOTAFOGO 3–2

26-08-78 . FRIENDLY TARRASSA-BARCELONA 0–1

29-08-78 . FRIENDLY GRANOLLERS-BARCELONA 2–3

03-09-78 . LIGA BARCELONA-SANTANDER 1–0

9-09-78 . LIGA VALENCIA-BARCELONA 2–1

13-09-78 . Cup Win.Cup BARCELONA-SHAKHTAR DONETSK 3–0

16-09-78 . LIGA BARCELONA-SALAMANCA 3–0

23-09-78 . LIGA REAL MADRID-BARCELONA 3–1

27-09-78 . Cup Win.Cup SHAKHTAR DONETSK-BARCELONA 1–1

1-10-78 . FRIENDLY BARCELONA-BELENENSES 8–0

8-10-78 . LIGA HERCULES-BARCELONA 0–2

14-10-78 . LIGA BARCELONA-LAS PALMAS 4–0

18-10-78 . Cup Win.Cup ANDERLECHT-BARCELONA 3–0

22-10-78 . LIGA ATHLETIC BILBAO-BARCELONA 3–1

28-10-78 . LIGA BARCELONA-BURGOS 2–0

01-11-78 . Cup Win.Cup BARCELONA-ANDERLECHT 3-0 /4-1/ PENALTY

05-11-78 . LIGA RECREATIVO-BARCELONA 0–0

19-11-78 . LIGA BARCELONA-CELTA 6–0

26-11-78 . LIGA SPORTING-BARCELONA 3–1

03-12-78 . LIGA BARCELONA-ATLETICO DE MADRID 2–4

17-12-78 . LIGA ESPANYOL-BARCELONA 0–2

30-12-78 . LIGA BARCELONA-ZARAGOZA 5–0

7-01-79 . LIGA REAL SOCIEDAD-BARCELONA 2–0

14-01-79 . LIGA BARCELONA-RAYO VALLECANO 9–0

21-01-79 . LIGA SEVILLA-BARCELONA 1–1

28-01-79 . LIGA SANTANDER-BARCELONA 2–1

31-01-79 . FRIENDLY BARCELONA-TWENTE ENSCHEDE 1–2

4-02-79 . LIGA BARCELONA-VALENCIA 1–1

11-02-79 . LIGA SALAMANCA-BARCELONA 1–0

17-02-79 . LIGA BARCELONA-REAL MADRID 2–0

24-02-79 . LIGA BARCELONA-HERCULES 3–0

28-02-79 . COPA DEL REY BARCELONA-VALENCIA 4–1

7-03-79 . Cup Win.Cup IPSWICH TOWN-BARCELONA 2–1

11-03-79 . LIGA LAS PALMAS-BARCELONA 2–1

17-03-79 . LIGA BARCELONA-ATHLETIC BILBAO 4–3

21-03-79 . Cup Win.Cup BARCELONA-IPSWICH TOWN 1–0

25-03-79 . LIGA BURGOS-BARCELONA 1–0

7-04-79 . LIGA BARCELONA-RECREATIVO HUELVA 2–0

11-04-79 . Cup Win.Cup BARCELONA-BEVEREN 1–0

15-04-79 . LIGA CELTA DE VIGO-BARCELONA 2–1

18-04-79 . COPA DEL REY VALENCIA-BARCELONA 4–0

21-04-79 . LIGA BARCELONA-SPORTING 6–0

25-04-79 . Cup Win.Cup BEVEREN-BARCELONA 0–1

29-04-79 . LIGA ATLETICO DE MADRID-BARCELONA 1–1

05-05-79 . LIGA BARCELONA-ESPANYOL 2–1

12-05-79 . LIGA ZARAGOZA-BARCELONA 1–1

16-05-79 . Cup Win.Cup Final BARCELONA-FORTUNA DUSSELDORF 4–3

20-05-79 . LIGA BARCELONA-REAL SOCIEDAD 1–3

27-05-79 . LIGA RAYO VALLECANO-BARCELONA 1–1

03-06-79 . LIGA BARCELONA-SEVILLA 1–0

5-06-79 . TOULOUSE TOURNAMENT BAYERN MUNICH-BARCELONA 0-0 PENALTY /1-2/ W/O

6-06-79 . TOULOUSE TOURNAMENT BEVEREN-BARCELONA 1–2
