= List of Brazilian footballers in La Liga =

The list of Brazilian men's footballers in La Liga records the association football players from Brazil who have appeared at least once for a team in the Spanish league. Entries in bold denote players still active in actual season.

== A ==
- Abner Vinícius – Betis – 2022–24
- Ademir – Celta – 1978–79, 82–83
- Aderlan Santos – Valencia – 2015–17
- Adriano – Sevilla, Barcelona – 2004–16
- Adriano – Málaga – 2008–09
- Adriano Teixeira – Celta – 1996–97, 98–00
- Alcántara – Sporting – 1975–76
- Alemão – Atlético Madrid – 1986–88
- **Alemão** – **Rayo** – 2025–
- Alexandre Pato – Villarreal – 2016–17
- Alex Telles – Sevilla – 2022–23
- Almir – Levante – 1963–64
- Aloísio Pires – Barcelona – 1988–90
- Álvaro José Rodríguez – Atlético Madrid – 1959–60
- Álvaro Luiz Maior – Las Palmas, Zaragoza, Levante – 2000–02, 03–08
- Amarildo – Celta, Logroñés – 1988–89, 92–93
- Amoroso – Málaga – 2004–05
- Anderson Silva – Racing, Málaga – 2003–06
- André Luiz – Tenerife – 1997–99
- Andreas Pereira – Granada, Valencia – 2016–18
- Andrei Frascarelli – Atlético Madrid – 1997–98
- Antônio Carlos – Albacete – 1992–93
- **Antony** – **Betis** – 2024–
- Argel – Racing – 2004–05
- Arílson – Valladolid – 1999–00
- Arthur – Barcelona, Girona – 2018–20, 24–25
- Arthuro – Alavés – 2005–06

== B ==
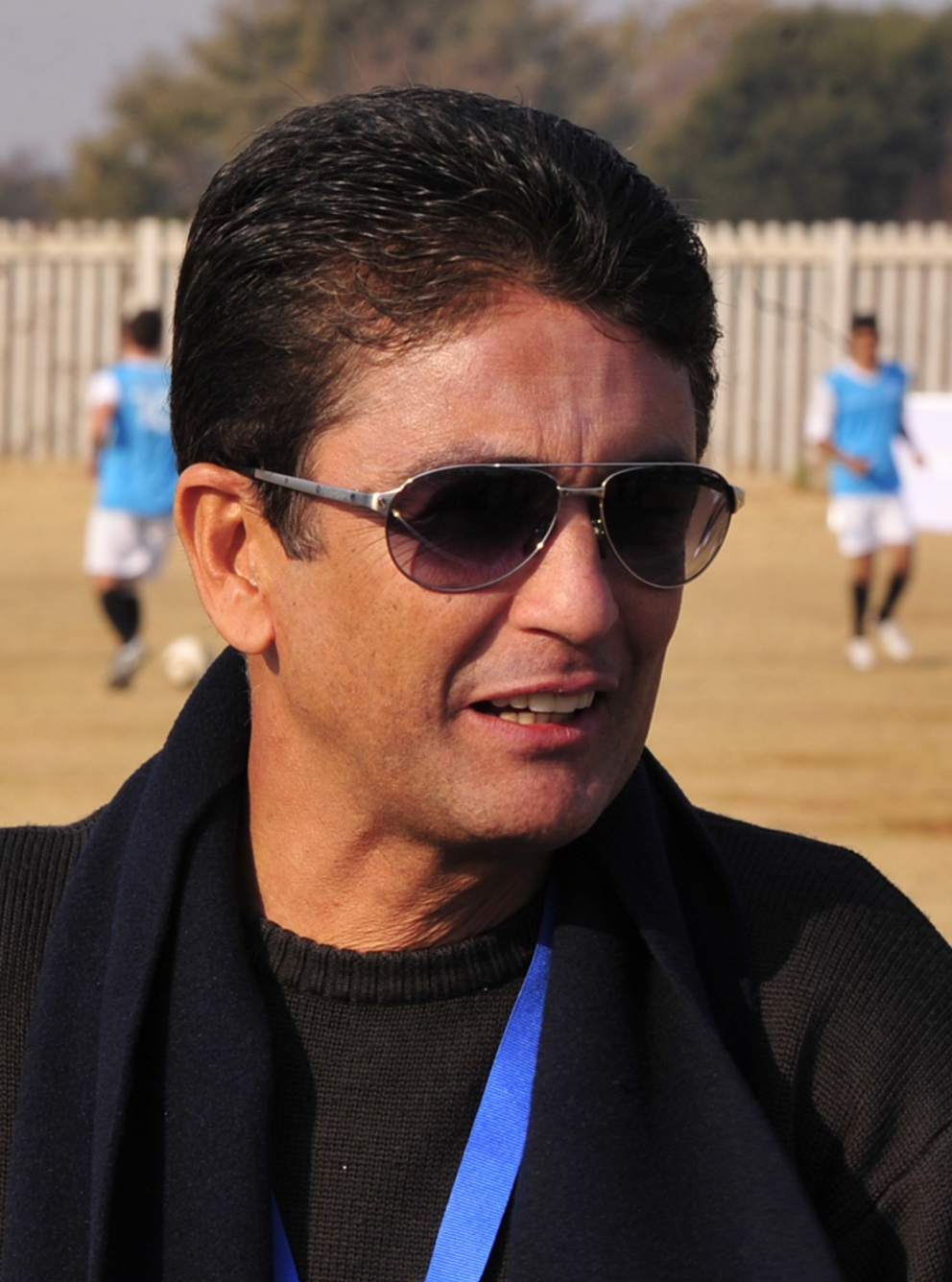
Bebeto in 2010

- Baiano – Las Palmas – 2000–01
- Baltazar – Celta, Atlético Madrid – 1985–86, 87–91
- Bebeto – Deportivo, Sevilla – 1992–97
- Bio – Barcelona, Espanyol – 1977–80
- Braga – Celta, Espanyol, Oviedo – 1957–61
- Brasi – Murcia – 1986–87

== C ==
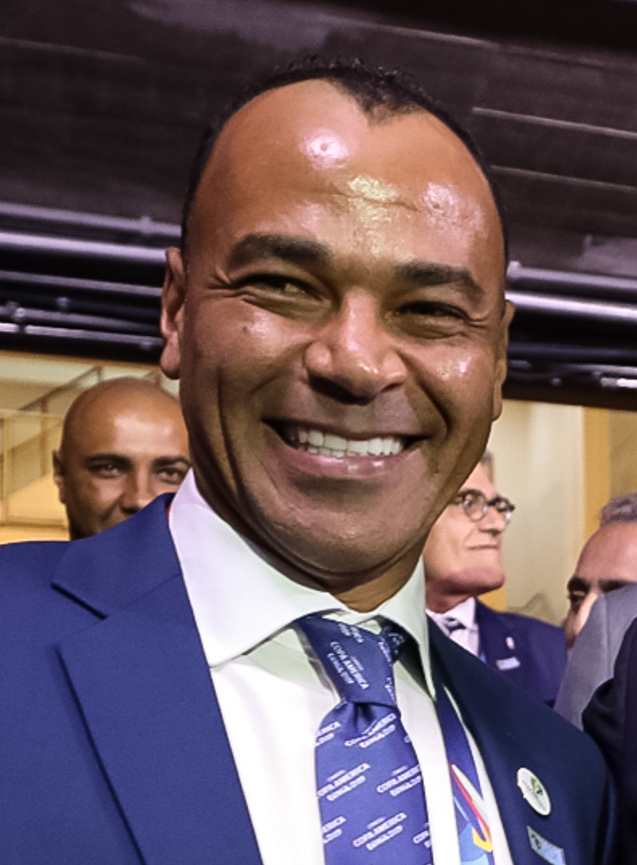
Cafu in 2019

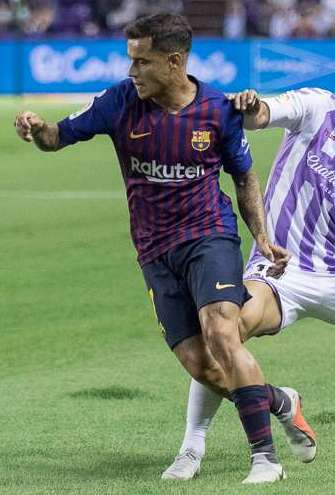
Coutinho playing for Barcelona in 2018

- Cacá – Albacete – 2003–04
- Cafu – Zaragoza – 1994–95
- Canário – Real Madrid, Sevilla, Zaragoza – 1959–68
- Carleto – Valencia – 2008–09
- Casemiro – Real Madrid – 2012–14, 15–23
- César Coelho – Sevilla – 1981–83
- César Sampaio – Deportivo – 2000–01
- Charles – Celta, Málaga, Eibar – 2013–20
- Charles Fabian – Málaga – 1989–90
- Chicão – Valencia – 1962–64
- Cicinho – Real Madrid – 2005–07
- Cicinho – Sevilla – 2012–13
- Cléber Américo da Conceição – Logroñés – 1991–94
- Cléber Eduardo Arado – Mérida – 1997–98
- Cléber Santana – Atlético Madrid, Mallorca – 2007–10
- Cuca – Valladolid – 1990–91

== D ==
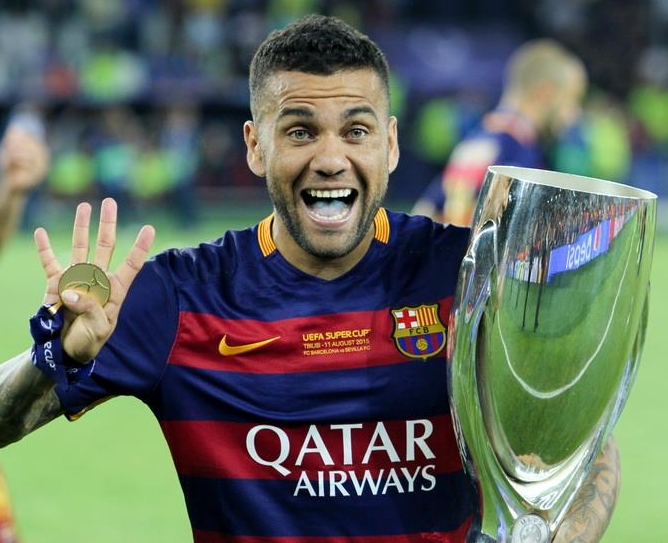
Dani Alves celebrating the UEFA Super Cup with Barcelona in 2015

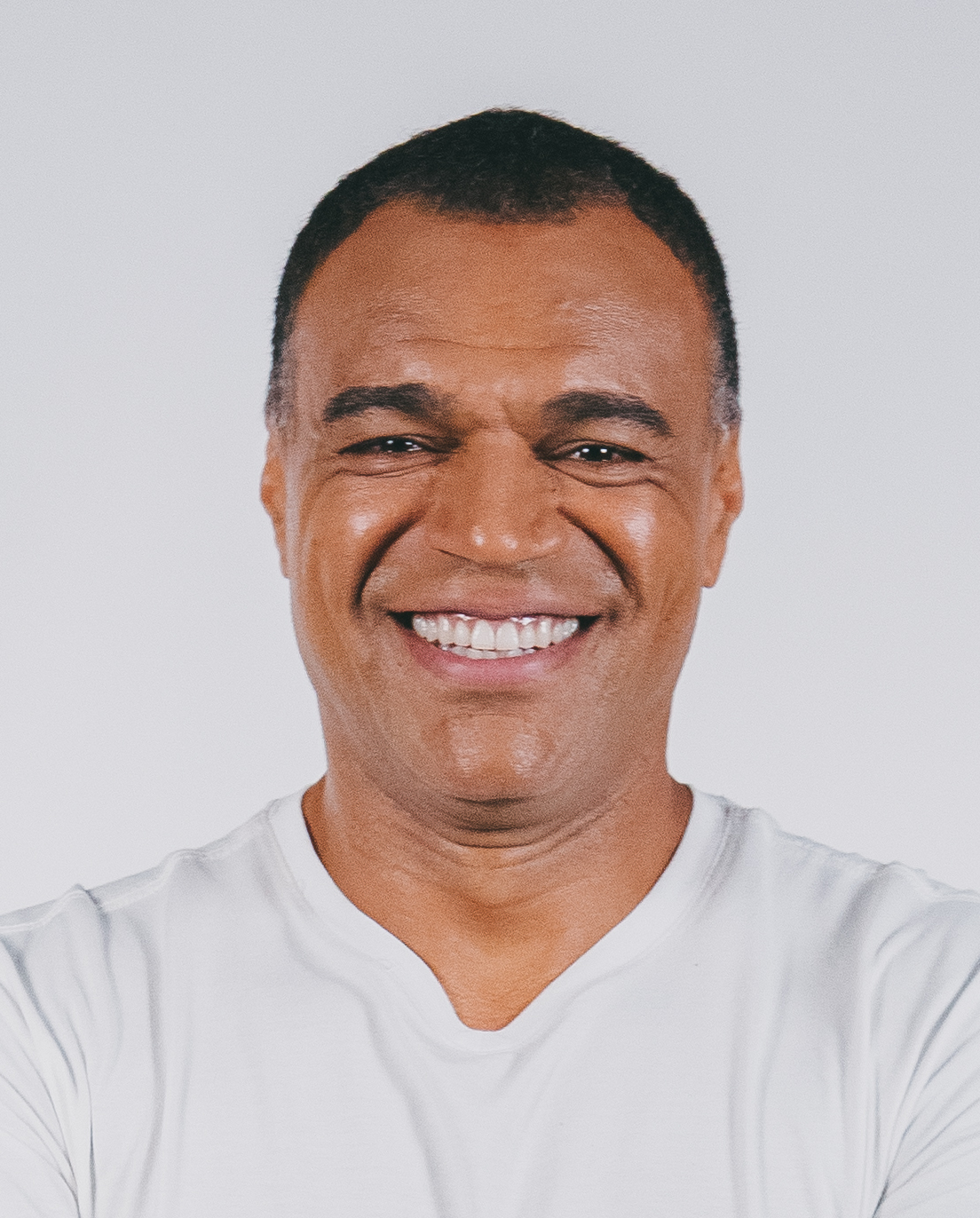
Denílson in 2021

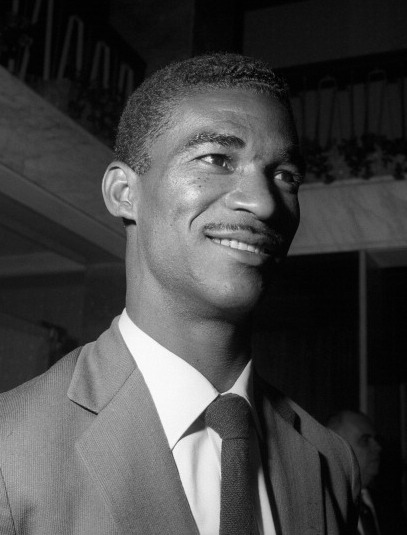
Didi in 1958

- Dani Alves – Sevilla, Barcelona – 2002–16, 21–22
- Daniel Fuzato – Getafe – 2023–24
- Danilo – Real Madrid – 2015–17
- Danilo Barbosa – Valencia – 2015–16
- Denílson – Betis – 1998–00, 01–05
- Deyverson – Levante, Alavés, Getafe – 2015–17, 19–21
- Didi – Real Madrid – 1959–60
- Diego – Atlético Madrid – 2011–12, 13–14
- Diego Alves – Almería, Valencia – 2007–17
- Diego Carlos – Sevilla – 2019–22
- Diego Costa – Valladolid, Atlético Madrid, Rayo – 2009–14, 17–21
- Diego Tardelli – Betis – 2005–06
- Dinho – Deportivo – 1991–92
- Dirceu – Atlético Madrid – 1979–82
- Djalminha – Deportivo – 1997–02, 03–04
- Dória – Granada – 2015–16
- Doriva – Celta – 2000–03
- Douglas – Barcelona, Sporting – 2014–17
- Douglas Luiz – Girona – 2017–19
- Duca – Zaragoza, Mallorca – 1958–66
- Duda – Sevilla – 1975–76

== E ==
- **Éder Militão** – **Real Madrid** – 2019–
- Edimar – Córdoba – 2014–15
- Edmílson – Barcelona, Villarreal, Zaragoza – 2004–09, 09–11
- Edu – Celta, Betis – 2000–09
- Edu – Valencia – 2005–09
- Edu Manga – Valladolid – 1996–98
- Eduardo – Espanyol – 2005–07
- Elias – Atlético Madrid – 2010–11
- Élton – Alavés – 2005–06
- Emerson – Tenerife, Deportivo, Atlético Madrid – 1997–99, 00–03
- Emerson – Real Madrid – 2006–07
- Emerson Royal – Betis, Barcelona – 2018–22
- **Endrick** – **Real Madrid** – 2024–26, 26–
- Esquerdinha – Zaragoza – 2001–02
- Evaristo – Barcelona, Real Madrid – 1957–64
- Ewerthon – Zaragoza, Espanyol – 2005–07, 07–08, 09–10

== F ==
- Fabiano Eller – Atlético Madrid – 2006–08
- Fabiano Pereira – Albacete – 2003–04
- Fabiano Soares – Celta, Compostela – 1989–90, 94–98
- Fábio Aurélio – Valencia – 2000–06
- Fábio Pinto – Oviedo – 1998–00
- Fábio Rochemback – Barcelona – 2001–03
- Felipe – Atlético Madrid – 2019–23
- Felipe Mattioni – Mallorca, Espanyol – 2009–15
- Felipe Melo – Mallorca, Racing, Almería – 2004–08
- Fernando – Sevilla – 2019–24
- Fernando Abreu – Racing – 2006–07
- Fernando Baiano – Málaga, Celta, Murcia – 2004–08
- Fernando Guidicelli – Real Madrid – 1935–36
- Filipe Augusto – Valencia – 2014–15
- Filipe Luís – Deportivo, Atlético Madrid – 2006–14, 15–19
- Flávio Conceição – Deportivo, Real Madrid – 1996–03
- Fredson Camara – Espanyol – 2002–07

== G ==
- **Gabriel Jesus** – **Barcelona** – 2026–
- **Gabriel Moscardo** – **Espanyol** – 2026–
- Gabriel Paulista – Villarreal, Valencia, Atlético Madrid – 2013–15, 17–24
- Gabriel Pires – Leganés – 2016–18
- Gabriel Rodrigues – Málaga – 2005–06
- Gabriel Silva – Granada – 2016–17
- Ganso – Sevilla – 2016–18
- Genílson – Málaga – 1999–00
- George Lucas – Celta – 2006–07
- Geovanni Deiberson – Barcelona – 2001–03
- Gilberto Alves "Gil" – Murcia – 1980–81
- Gilberto Ribeiro "Gil" – Gimnàstic – 2006–07
- Gilmar – Zaragoza, Rayo – 1996–00
- Gilson Granzotto – Logroñés – 1990–91
- Giovanella – Salamanca, Celta – 1997–04, 05–06
- Giovanni Silva – Barcelona – 1996–99
- Glaucio – Rayo – 2000–02
- Guilherme Arana – Sevilla – 2017–19
- Guilherme de Cássio Alves – Rayo – 1995–97
- Guilherme dos Santos Torres – Deportivo – 2016–18
- Guilherme Oliveira Santos – Almería – 2007–10
- Guilherme Siqueira – Granada, Atlético Madrid, Valencia – 2011–13, 14–17
- Guina – Murcia, Tenerife – 1983–85, 86–87, 89–90
- Gustavo Nery – Zaragoza – 2006–07

== H ==
- Henrique Almeida – Granada – 2011–12
- Henrique Silva – Valladolid – 2024–25

== I ==
- Índio – Espanyol – 1959–62
- Iriney – Rayo, Celta, Almería, Betis, Granada – 2002–03, 05–09, 11–13
- Iván Rocha – Valladolid, Atlético Madrid, Logroñés, Mallorca, Alavés, Numancia – 1993–95, 96–97, 97–00

== J ==
- Jailson – Celta – 2023–25
- Jajá – Getafe – 2005–06
- Jamelli – Zaragoza – 1997–02
- Jeremias – Espanyol – 1975–78
- João Jorge – Oviedo – 1962–63
- João Victor – Mallorca – 2010–13
- Joãozinho – Recreativo – 2002–03
- Joel – Valencia – 1958–61
- Jonas – Valencia – 2010–14
- Jônatas – Espanyol – 2006–08
- Jonathas – Elche, Real Sociedad – 2014–16
- Jordão – Cádiz – 1991–92
- Jorge Wagner – Betis – 2006–07
- Josimar – Sevilla – 1987–88
- Juca – Deportivo – 2009–11
- Juliano Belletti – Villarreal, Barcelona – 2002–07
- Júlio Baptista – Sevilla, Real Madrid, Málaga – 2003–06, 07–08, 10–13
- Júlio César – Valladolid, Real Madrid, Real Sociedad – 1996–01, 03–04
- Júlio César Jacobi – Granada, Getafe – 2011–12, 13–14
- Juninho – Atlético Madrid – 1997–99

== K ==
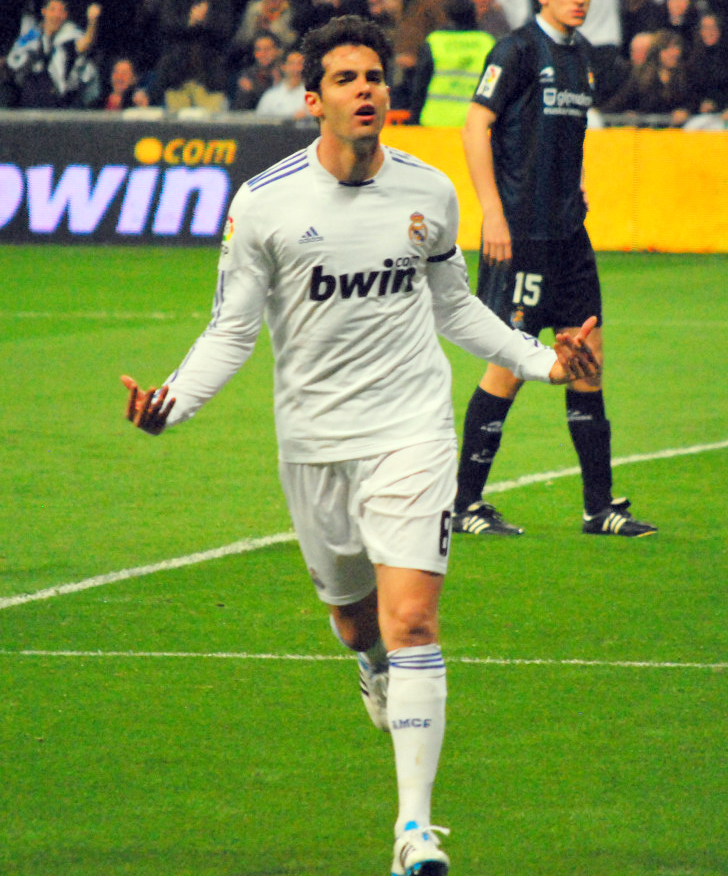
Kaká scoring for Real Madrid in 2011

- Kaiky – Almería – 2022–24
- Kaká – Real Madrid – 2009–13
- Kelly – Logroñés – 1996–97
- Kenedy – Getafe, Granada, Valladolid – 2019–21, 22–23, 24–25

== L ==
- Lázaro – Almería – 2022–24
- Leandro Damião – Betis – 2015–16
- Leandro Machado – Valencia, Tenerife – 1996–97, 98–99
- Leivinha – Atlético Madrid – 1975–79
- Léo Baptistão – Rayo, Atlético Madrid, Betis, Villarreal, Espanyol, Almería – 2012–19, 22–24
- Leonardo – Valencia – 1991–93
- Liert – Betis – 1962–64
- Lima – Betis – 2007–09
- Livinho – Oviedo – 1962–64
- Lucas Piazon – Málaga – 2012–13
- Lucas Pires – Cádiz – 2023–24
- Lucas Rosa – Valladolid – 2022–23, 24–25
- Lucas Silva – Real Madrid – 2014–15
- Luciano – Leganés – 2016–17
- Lucídio Batista da Silva – Barcelona – 1947–48
- Luís Fabiano – Sevilla – 2005–11
- Luisinho da Silva – Las Palmas – 1981–82
- Luisinho Quintanilha – Celta – 1993–94
- Luiz Alberto – Real Sociedad – 2000–02, 04–05
- Luizão – Deportivo – 1997–98
- Luiz Carlos – Murcia – 1987–88
- Luiz Henrique – Betis – 2022–24
- **Luiz Júnior** – **Villarreal** – 2024–
- Luiz Pereira – Atlético Madrid – 1975–80

== M ==
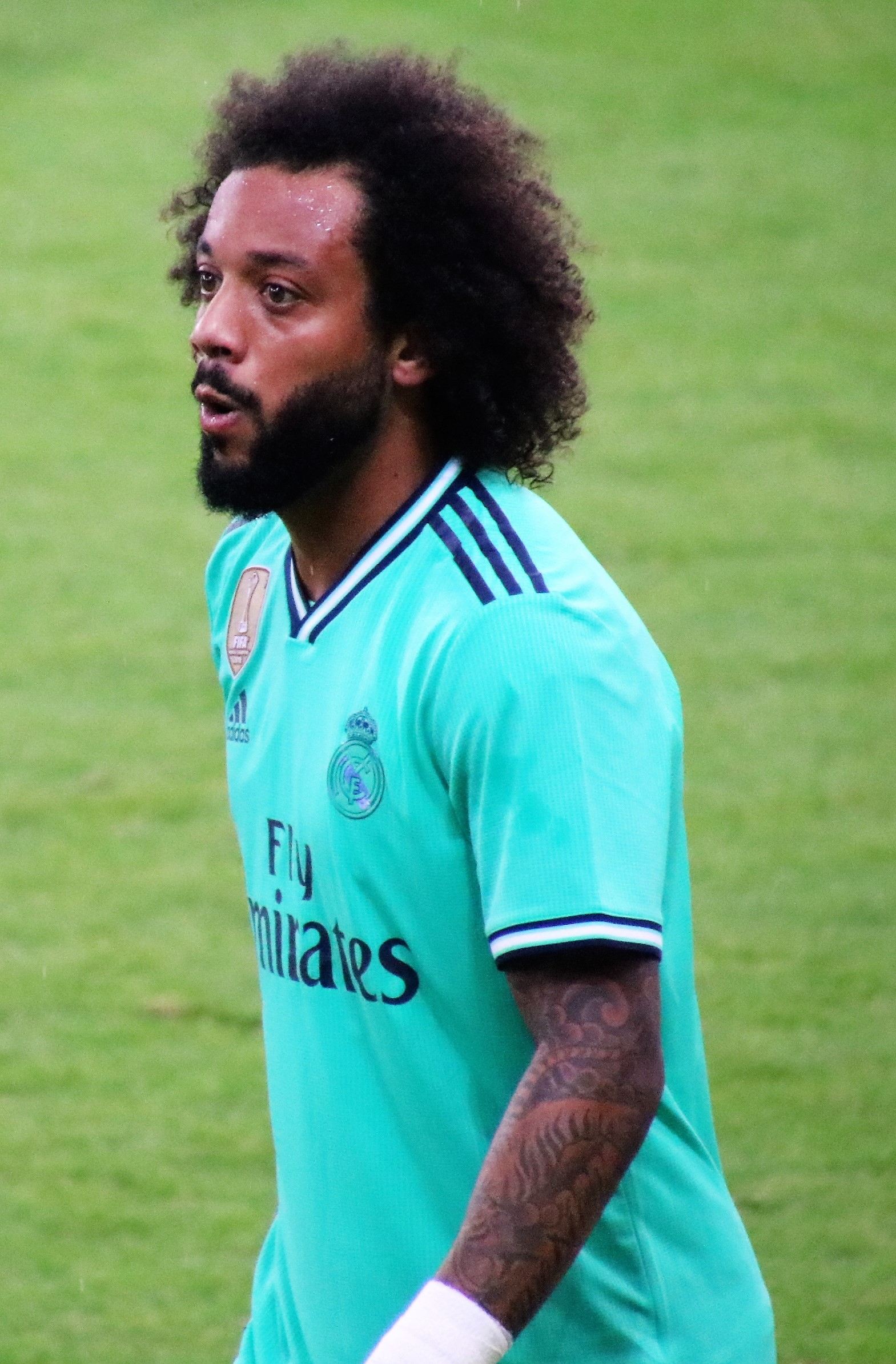
Marcelo in action for Real Madrid in 2019

- Macedo – Cádiz – 1992–93
- Machado – Valencia – 1957–60
- Matuzalém – Zaragoza – 2007–08
- Magno Mocelin – Alavés – 1998–03
- Malcom – Barcelona – 2018–19
- **Marcão** – **Sevilla** – 2022–
- Marcelinho Carioca – Valencia – 1997–98
- Marcelo – Real Madrid – 2006–22
- Marcelo Rocha – Rayo – 1992–93
- Marcos André – Valladolid, Valencia – 2020–23, 24–25
- Marcos Assunção – Betis – 2002–07
- Mariano Ferreira – Sevilla – 2015–17
- Marinho Peres – Barcelona – 1974–76
- Marlon Brandão – Valladolid – 1993–94
- Marlon Santos – Barcelona – 2016–17
- Martins – Mallorca – 1961–62
- Matheus Cunha – Atlético Madrid – 2021–23
- Matheus Fernandes – Valladolid – 2019–20
- Maurício – Compostela – 1996–97
- Mauricio Casas – Castellón – 1990–91
- Maurício Oliveira – Celta – 1989–90
- Mauro Silva – Deportivo – 1992–05
- Maxwell – Barcelona – 2009–12
- Mazinho – Valencia, Celta – 1994–00
- Messias – Racing – 2002–03
- Michel Macedo – Almería, Las Palmas – 2008–11, 14–15, 16–18
- Miranda – Atlético Madrid – 2011–15
- Moacir – Atlético Madrid, Sevilla – 1993–94, 94–96
- Moreira – Betis – 1958–59

== N ==
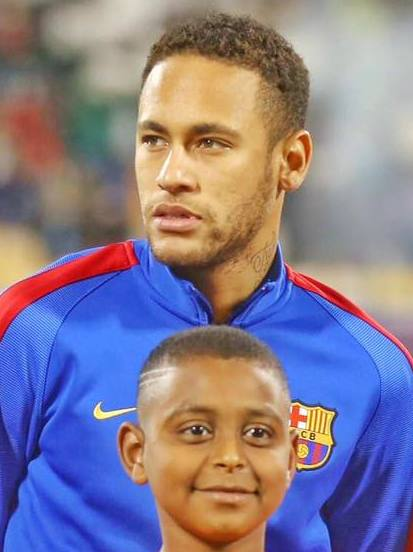
Neymar lining up for Barcelona in 2016

- Naldo – Getafe, Espanyol – 2014–15, 17–20
- **Natan** – **Betis** – 2024–
- Nenê – Mallorca, Alavés, Celta, Espanyol – 2003–04, 05–07, 08–09
- Neto – Valencia, Barcelona – 2017–22
- Neymar – Barcelona – 2013–17
- Nilmar – Villarreal – 2009–12
- Nílson – Celta, Albacete, Valladolid – 1989–90, 93–95

== O ==
- Odair – Almería – 1979–80

== P ==
- Pablo Barros – Málaga – 2008–09
- Palhinha – Mallorca – 1997–98
- Paulão – Betis – 2011–14
- Paulinho – Barcelona – 2017–18
- Paulo Assunção – Atlético Madrid, Deportivo – 2008–12, 12–13
- Pedro Botelho – Rayo, Levante – 2011–12
- **Pedro Felipe** – **Racing** – 2026–
- Pedro Oldoni – Valladolid – 2008–09
- Petros – Betis – 2015–17
- Philippe Coutinho – Espanyol, Barcelona – 2011–12, 17–19, 20–22
- Pinheiro – Osasuna – 2003–04
- Pintinho – Sevilla, Cádiz – 1980–84, 85–86

== R ==
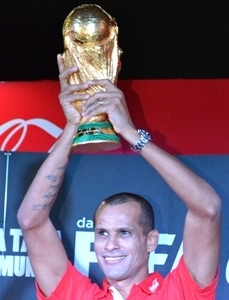
Rivaldo in 2014

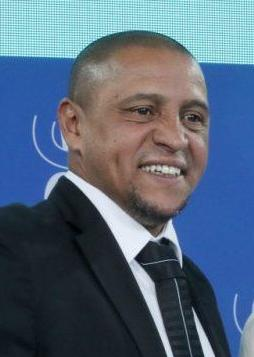
Roberto Carlos in 2019

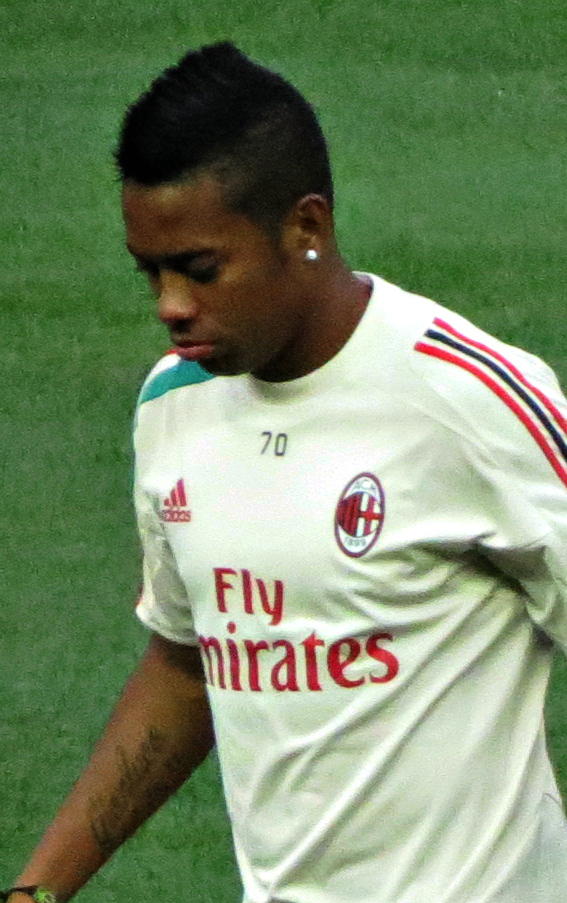
Robinho in 2012

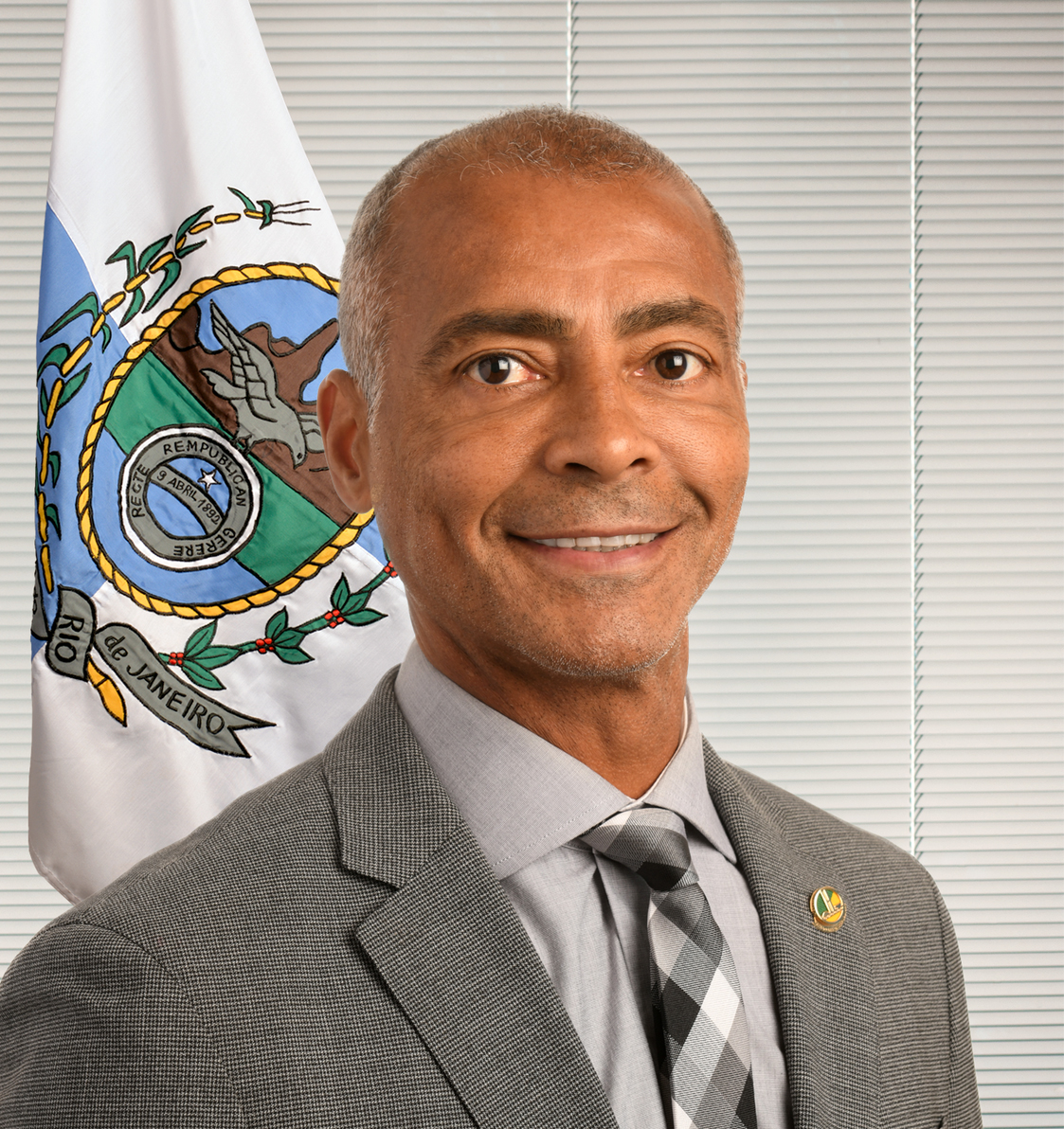
Romário in 2023

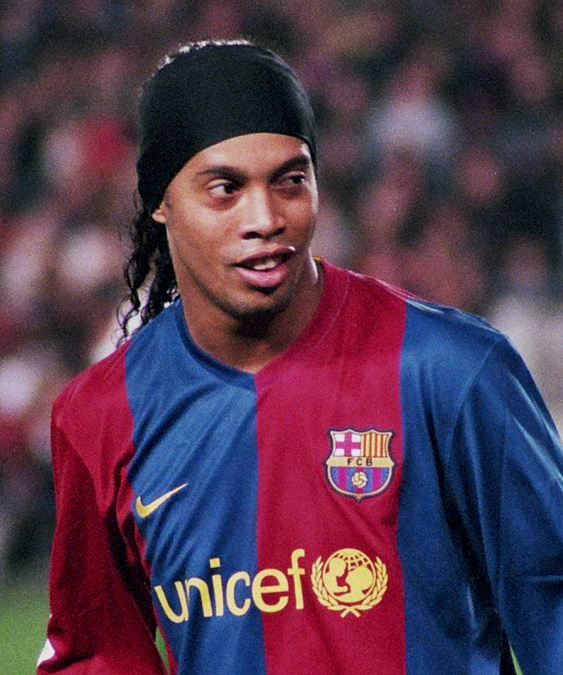
Ronaldinho playing for Barcelona in 2007

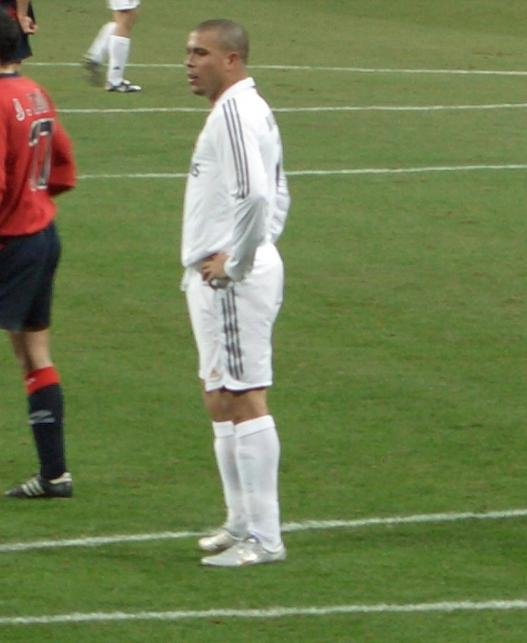
Ronaldo with Real Madrid in 2005

- Rafael Jacques – Betis – 1998–99
- Rafael Martins – Levante – 2014–15
- Rafael Sóbis – Betis – 2006–08
- Rafinha – Celta, Barcelona, Real Sociedad – 2013–17, 18–20, 21–22
- Ramalho – Murcia – 1988–89
- Ramiro – Atlético Madrid – 1959–65
- **Raphinha** – **Barcelona** – 2022–
- Recamán – Espanyol, Valencia – 1958–63
- Reinier Jesus – Girona – 2022–23
- Renaldo – Deportivo – 1996–97
- Renan – Valencia, Xerez – 2008–10
- Renan Lodi – Atlético Madrid – 2019–22
- Renato – Sevilla – 2004–11
- Ricardo Bóvio – Málaga – 2005–06
- Ricardo Oliveira – Valencia, Betis, Zaragoza – 2003–06, 07–08, 08–09
- Rivaldo – Deportivo, Barcelona – 1996–02
- Robert – Betis – 2005–07
- Roberto Sousa – Celta – 2005–06
- Roberto Dinamite – Barcelona – 1979–80
- Roberto Carlos – Real Madrid – 1996–07
- Robinho – Real Madrid – 2005–08
- Ricardo Rocha – Real Madrid – 1991–93
- Rodrigão – Sporting – 1997–98
- Rodrigo Ely – Alavés, Almería – 2016–21, 22–23
- Rodrigo Fabri – Valladolid, Atlético Madrid – 1999–00, 03–04
- **Rodrygo** – **Real Madrid** – 2019–
- Romário – Barcelona, Valencia – 1993–95, 96–97, 97–98
- Ronaldinho – Barcelona – 2003–08
- Ronaldo – Barcelona, Real Madrid – 1996–97, 02–07
- Rosinei – Murcia – 2007–08
- Rossato – Real Sociedad, Málaga – 2004–05, 06–07, 08–09
- Rovérsio – Osasuna – 2008–10, 11–12
- Ryder Matos – Córdoba – 2014–15

== S ==
- Samuel Lino – Valencia, Atlético Madrid – 2022–25
- Sávio – Real Madrid, Zaragoza, Real Sociedad, Levante – 1997–02, 03–06, 06–08
- Savinho – Girona – 2023–24
- Sena – Osasuna – 2000–01
- Sidnei – Espanyol, Deportivo, Betis – 2013–21
- Sílvio – Logroñés – 1994–95
- Sinval – Mérida – 1995–96, 97–98
- Sonny Anderson – Barcelona, Villarreal – 1997–99, 03–05
- Souza – Sporting – 1996–97
- Sylvinho – Celta, Barcelona – 2001–09

== T ==
- Tato – Elche – 1988–89
- Thiago Galhardo – Celta – 2021–22
- Tilico – Cádiz, Atlético Madrid – 1991–92, 93–94
- Toni – Valencia – 1989–93
- Totó – Zaragoza – 1969–70, 72–73

== V ==
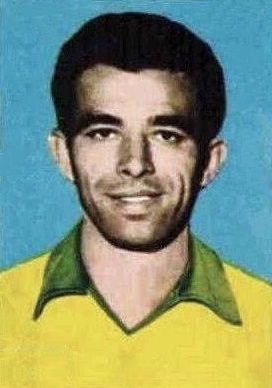
Vavá in 1962

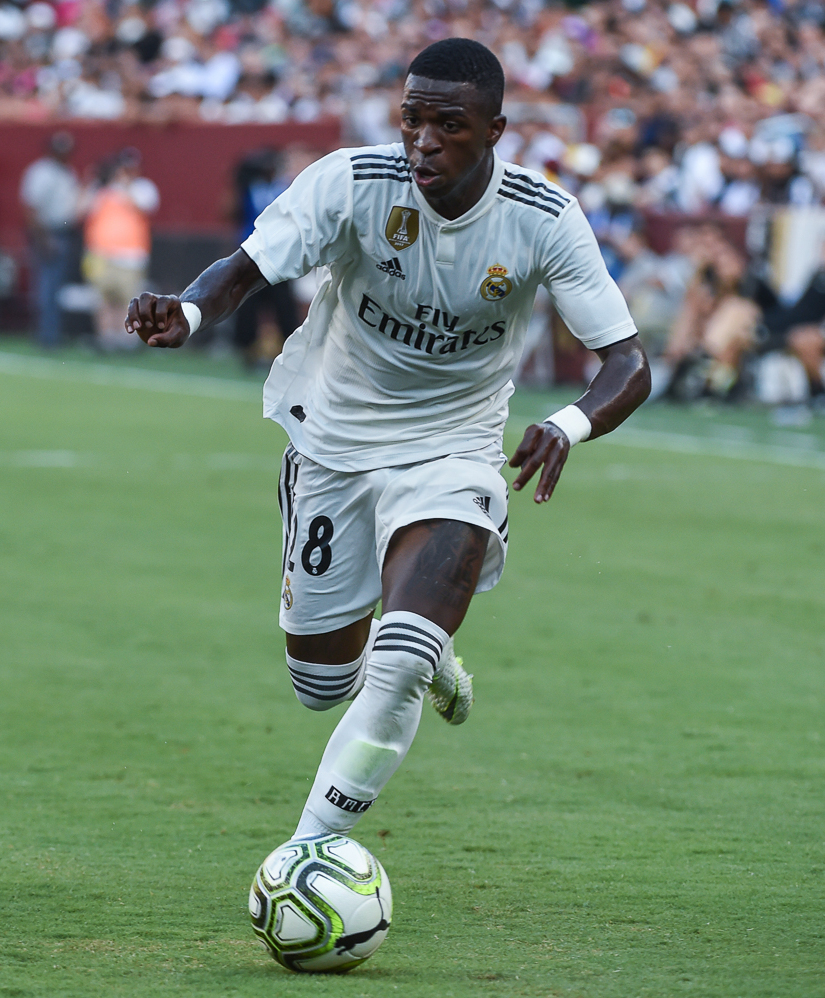
Vinícius Júnior with Real Madrid in 2018

- Vágner – Celta – 2000–04
- Vavá – Atlético Madrid – 1958–61
- Vinícius Araújo – Valencia – 2013–14
- **Vinícius Júnior** – **Real Madrid** – 2018–
- Vinícius Souza – Espanyol – 2022–23
- Viola – Valencia – 1995–96
- Vítor – Real Madrid – 1993–94
- Vitor Reis – Girona – 2025–26
- Vitor Roque – Barcelona, Betis – 2023–25

== W ==
- Waldo – Valencia – 1961–70
- Walter – Valencia – 1957–61
- Wanderley – Levante, Málaga – 1963–65, 67–69
- Wanderson – Getafe – 2015–16
- Weligton – Málaga – 2008–17
- Wellington Silva – Levante, Almería – 2010–11, 14–15
- Welliton – Celta – 2013–14
- Wesley – Real Sociedad – 2025–26
- Wesley Lopes – Alavés – 2005–06
- William – Compostela – 1996–98
- Willian José – Real Madrid, Las Palmas, Real Sociedad, Betis – 2013–14, 15–21, 21–24

== Y ==
- Yan Couto – Girona – 2022–24

== Z ==
- Zé Maria – Levante – 2006–07
- Zé Roberto – Real Madrid – 1996–98

== See also ==
- List of foreign La Liga players
- List of Brazilian footballers in Serie A

== Notes ==
1. Born in Belgium
2. Capped for the Belgium national under-17 football team
3. Capped for the Belgium national under-16 football team
4. Capped for the Belgium national under-15 football team
5. Capped for the Catalonia national football team
6. Capped for the Spain national football team
7. Capped for the Italy national under-20 football team
8. Capped for the Italy national under-19 football team
9. Capped for the Spain national under-19 football team
10. Capped for the Spain national under-17 football team
11. Capped for the Spain national under-16 football team

== Sources ==
- Foreign Players in the Spanish League (First Division) by RSSSF
- Histórico de Primera División by BDFutbol
