= Miquel Mir =

Spanish footballer (born 1956)

Miquel Mir Genes (born 24 March 1956) is a Spanish former footballer who played as a forward.

He played 21 La Liga games and scored 3 goals for Barcelona and Racing Santander, as well as 56 games and 7 goals in the Segunda División for Barcelona B, Real Valladolid and Sabadell. He represented the Spanish Olympic team at the 1976 tournament.

== Club career ==
Born in Sant Adrià de Besòs in the Barcelona metropolitan area, Mir was scouted for FC Barcelona when he was 12. He made his debut for the B-team in the Segunda División on 22 September 1974 in a 7–1 loss away to Sevilla, totalling 17 appearances over the league season and being sent off on 17 May in the penultimate game, lost 1–0 at Recreativo de Huelva. In the Copa del Generalísimo that season, he scored in a win over La Liga club Salamanca.

Mir scored five goals in his second season with the reserve team, beginning on 14 September 1975 when he came on as a substitute and scored a late goal in a 1–1 draw at home to Celta Vigo. On 23 November, profiting from Carles Rexach's injury, he debuted in the first team in a 1–0 loss at Real Betis, and in his next game two weeks later he scored in a 2–2 draw away to Real Sociedad. He scored once more in his 12 games that season, also including a UEFA Cup semi-final loss to Liverpool at the Camp Nou and an expulsion on 21 December in a 3–2 loss at Valencia, alongside opponent José Cerveró.

Mir had been a protégé of Barcelona manager Hennes Weisweiler, whose dispute with star player Johan Cruyff ended in the restoration of Rinus Michels as manager. The new Dutch manager did not include him in his plans. In July 1977, Mir was linked with a transfer to Racing de Santander as compensation for Rafael Zuviría moving in the other direction. Mir at first questioned how he could be transferred due to his military service in Barcelona. Nevertheless, he was transferred, with Barcelona retaining a buyback clause for 10 million Spanish pesetas.

In October 1978, Barcelona sold Mir to Real Valladolid for 2.5 million, with the player choosing his destination ahead of an equal offer from Elche. Manager Helenio Herrera wanted to restore Mir in 1980 ahead of a UEFA Cup Winners' Cup game against Valencia, but was unable to as the player was registered with the reserves.

Mir dropped down to Segunda División B in August 1980 after his release from Barcelona, signing for fellow Catalan club Terrassa on a one-year deal with the option of a second. He had a brief spell at Sabadell the following season and was due to retire before his former Barcelona B manager Luis Aloy convinced him to play one last season in the Tercera División for Sant Andreu.

== International career ==
Mir played for Spain at under-21 and under-23 level. With the latter, he was chosen for the 1976 Olympic event in Canada, coming on as a half-time substitute for Alberto Vitoria in a 2–1 loss to Brazil in the first group game.

== Post-playing career ==
Having left football at 27, Mir entered business at Danone. He worked there for 35 years before his retirement.
