= Rafael Zuviría =

Argentine footballer (born 1951)

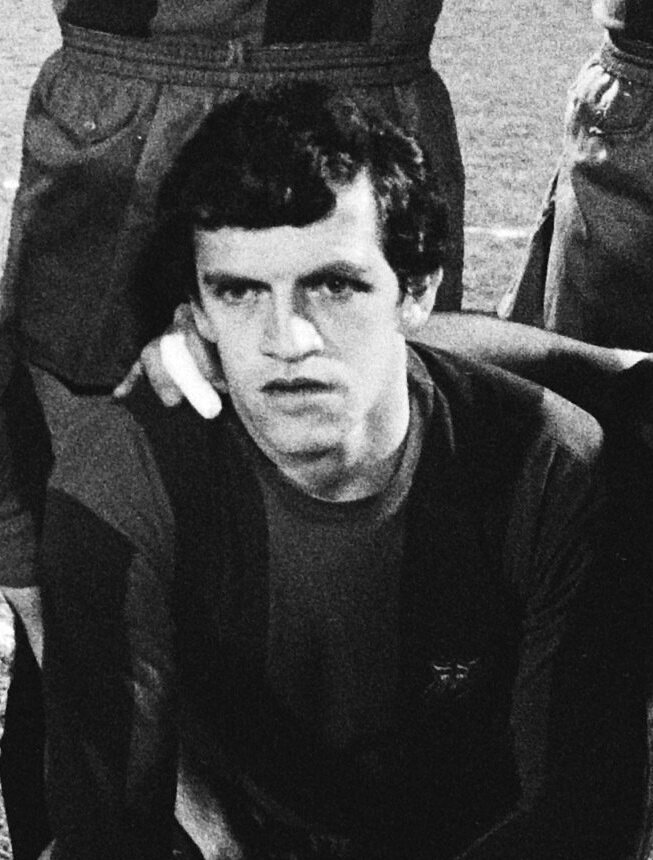

Personal information
- Full name: Rafael Dalmacio Zuviría Rodríguez
- Date of birth: 10 January 1951 (age 75)
- Place of birth: Argentina
- Positions: Defender; striker

Senior career*
Years	Team	Apps	(Gls)
1969–1970	Unión de Santa Fe	32	(3)
1971–1973	Argentinos Juniors	60	(8)
1973–1977	Racing de Santander	131	(37)
1977–1982	FC Barcelona	119	(11)
1982–1984	RCD Mallorca	60	(1)
1985–1986	Defensores de Belgrano		
- * Club domestic league appearances and goals

Rafael Dalmacio Zuviría Rodríguez (born 10 January 1951) is an Argentine former footballer who played as a defender or striker.

== Career ==
As a youth player, he joined the youth academy of Argentine side Unión de Santa Fe. He started his senior career with the club. In 1971, he signed for Spanish side Argentinos Juniors. In 1973, he signed for Spanish side Racing de Santander. In 1977, he signed for Spanish La Liga side FC Barcelona. He played alongside Dutch internationals Johan Cruyff and Johan Neeskens while playing for the club. He helped them win the 1979 European Cup Winners' Cup.

In 1982, he signed for Spanish side RCD Mallorca. In 1985, he signed for Argentine side Defensores de Belgrano. He helped the club achieve second place in the league. He was described as "recognised for his courage, tenacity and perseverance [as a player]".

He was born on 10 January 1951 in Argentina. He is a native of Santa Fe Province, Argentina. He has been nicknamed "El Torito". After retiring from professional football, he lived in Catalonia, Spain. He has worked as a salesman. He has a brother. He has been married.
