= Pepito Ramos =

Spanish footballer and coach

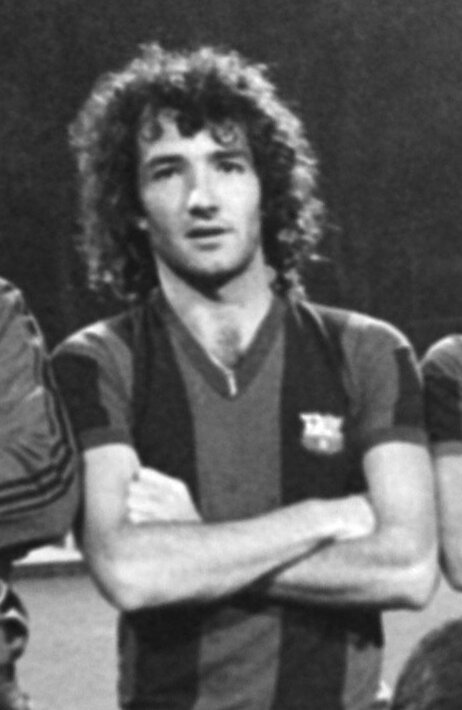
- Ramos in 1977

Personal information
- Full name: José Antonio Ramos Huete
- Date of birth: 3 April 1951 (age 75)
- Place of birth: Tétouan, Spanish Morocco (now Morocco)
- Height: 1.75 m (5 ft 9 in)
- Position: Right back

Youth career
- Sant Ferran Mataró
- Escoles Pies Mataró

Senior career*
Years	Team	Apps	(Gls)
1969–1971	Mataró		
1971–1976	Espanyol	125	(0)
1976–1983	Barcelona	119	(0)
1983	Cartagena	18	(0)
Total		262	(0)

International career
1973–1976	Catalonia	2	(0)
1975	Spain amateur	3	(0)
1975–1977	Spain	4	(0)

Managerial career
- Premià (youth)
- Vic
- 1996–1997: Santboià
- 1999: Gimnàstic
- 2000: Manlleu
- 2002–2003: Prat
- 2006: Rubí
- * Club domestic league appearances and goals

José Antonio 'Pepito' Ramos Huete (born 3 April 1951) is a Spanish former footballer who played as a right back and is now a coach.

He spent most of his career in La Liga, amassing 244 appearances during 11 seasons, with Espanyol and Barcelona.

== Playing career ==
Born in Tétouan, Morocco, Ramos moved to Spain at early age and made his senior debuts with CE Mataró in 1969 at the age of 18, in Tercera División. After two seasons as a starter (suffering relegation in his second), he moved straight to La Liga, signing for RCD Espanyol.

Ramos made his debut in the main category of Spanish football on 10 October 1971, coming on as a second-half substitute in a 1–1 home draw against Burgos CF. After being sparingly used in the 1972–73 campaign, he subsequently became an undisputed starter for the Pericos, never appearing in fewer than 25 matches per season.

On 14 July 1976, Ramos moved to cross-town rivals FC Barcelona, for a fee of 30 million pesetas. With the side he started in 1981 Copa del Rey Final, and appeared regularly over the course of five seasons.

In January 1983, Ramos was released by Barcelona and immediately moved to FC Cartagena in Segunda División. After appearing regularly, he retired in the end of the 1982–83 season, aged 31.

== International career ==
On 12 October 1975, Ramos made his debut for Spain, starting in a 2–0 win against Denmark. He appeared in three further matches for the national team, aside from two caps for Catalonia.

== Managerial career ==
Shortly after retiring, Ramos took up coaching and had spells at UE Vic, FC Santboià, Gimnàstic de Tarragona, AEC Manlleu, AE Prat and UE Rubí.

== Honours ==
Barcelona

- UEFA Cup Winners' Cup: 1978–79, 1981–82
- Copa del Rey: 1977–78, 1980–81

== See also ==
- List of Spain international footballers born outside Spain
