= Manolo Clares =

Spanish footballer

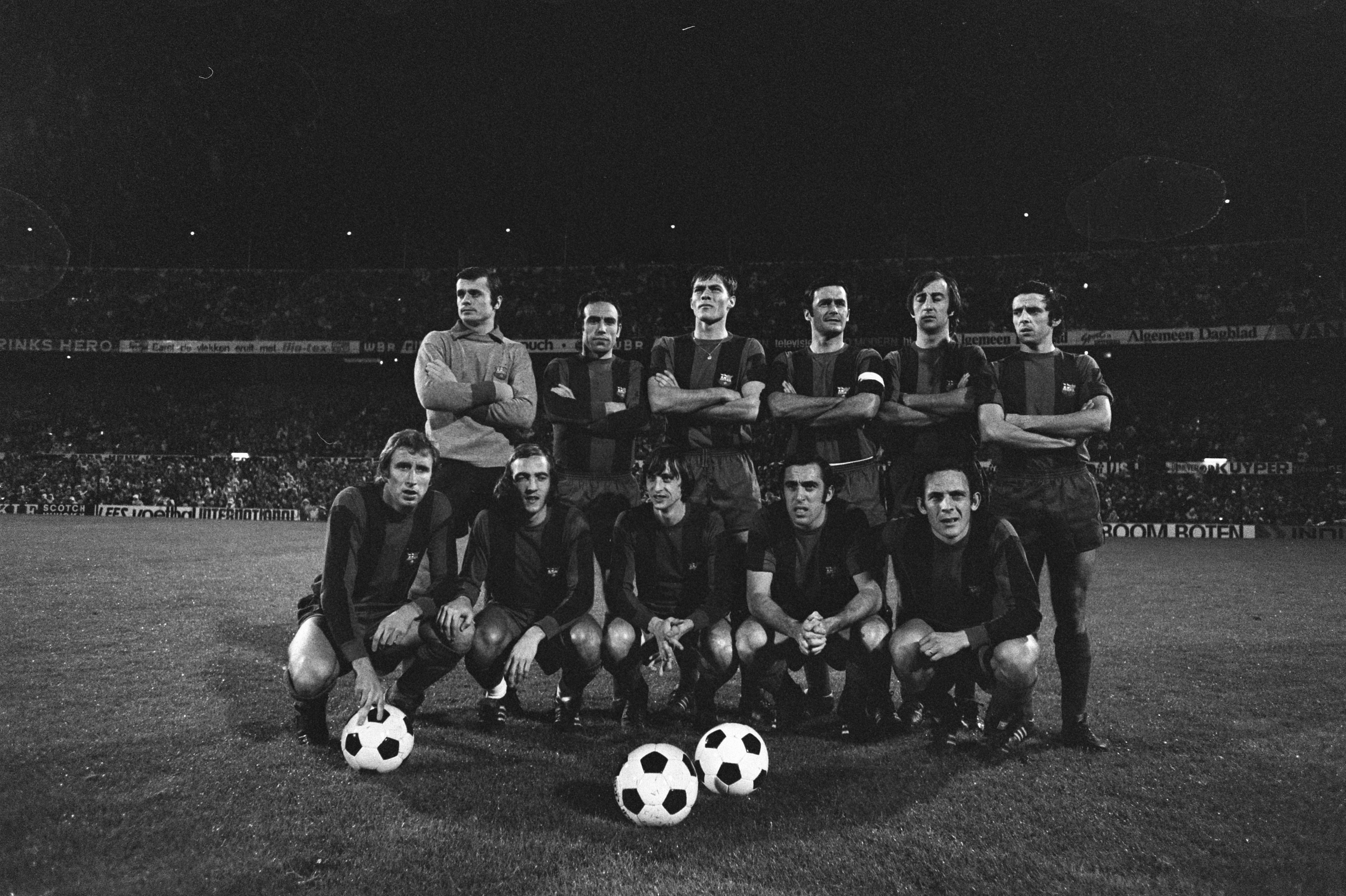
- Clares lining up for Barcelona in 1974

Personal information
- Full name: Manuel Clares García
- Date of birth: 23 February 1948 (age 78)
- Place of birth: Madrid, Spain
- Height: 1.77 m (5 ft 10 in)
- Position: Forward

Youth career
- Atlético Madrid

Senior career*
Years	Team	Apps	(Gls)
1965–1966	Getafe Deportivo		
1966–1971	Gandía		
1970–1974	Castellón	110	(37)
1974–1978	Barcelona	87	(35)
1978–1980	Rayo Vallecano	47	(9)
1980–1981	Gandía		
1981–1982	Villarreal		

International career
1973	Spain	1	(0)
- * Club domestic league appearances and goals

Manuel 'Manolo' Clares García (23 February 1948) is a Spanish former professional footballer who played as a forward.

He appeared in 197 La Liga games over eight seasons, totalling 66 goals for Castellón, Barcelona and Rayo Vallecano.

== Club career ==
Born in Madrid, Clares played lower league football until the age of 23, representing Getafe Deportivo and CF Gandía. In March 1971 he signed with CD Castellón, scoring 13 goals in 36 games in his first full season to help the club return to La Liga after a 25-year absence.

Clares made his debut in the Spanish top flight on 17 September 1972, in a 1–4 home loss against Athletic Bilbao. During the campaign, he contributed 11 goals from 30 appearances to help the Valencians to a best-ever fifth position, as well as the final of the Copa del Rey. Subsequently, he caught the eye of both FC Barcelona and Real Madrid, but as the former had practically secured his services, manager Lucien Muller opposed to the transfer citing his team's lack of attacking options.

In late May 1974, after Castellón's relegation, Clares finally joined Barcelona, as a direct replacement for Johan Cruyff as the foreign players were not allowed to participate in the Spanish Cup. He finished top scorer of the knock-out competition with five goals in only six matches, but the final ended 4–0 in favour of Real Madrid.

During his four-year spell at the Camp Nou, Clares was regarded as a highly inconsistent player, capable of scoring wonderful goals but also of missing clear chances. On 28 November 1976, he netted five of the Blaugrana goals in a 6–1 home demolition of Valencia CF, for a total of 22 during the season.

In July 1978, after the arrival of president Josep Lluís Núñez, and with him former coach Muller, Clares was transferlisted. He moved to Rayo Vallecano in October, going on to be relatively played over a two-year tenure and retiring at the age of 32, even though he later returned for a spell in the lower divisions.

== International career ==
Clares won one cap for Spain: on 17 October 1973, he played 67 minutes in a 0–0 away friendly draw with Turkey.

== Honours ==
Barcelona

- Copa del Rey: 1977–78
