= Pedro Artola =

Spanish footballer

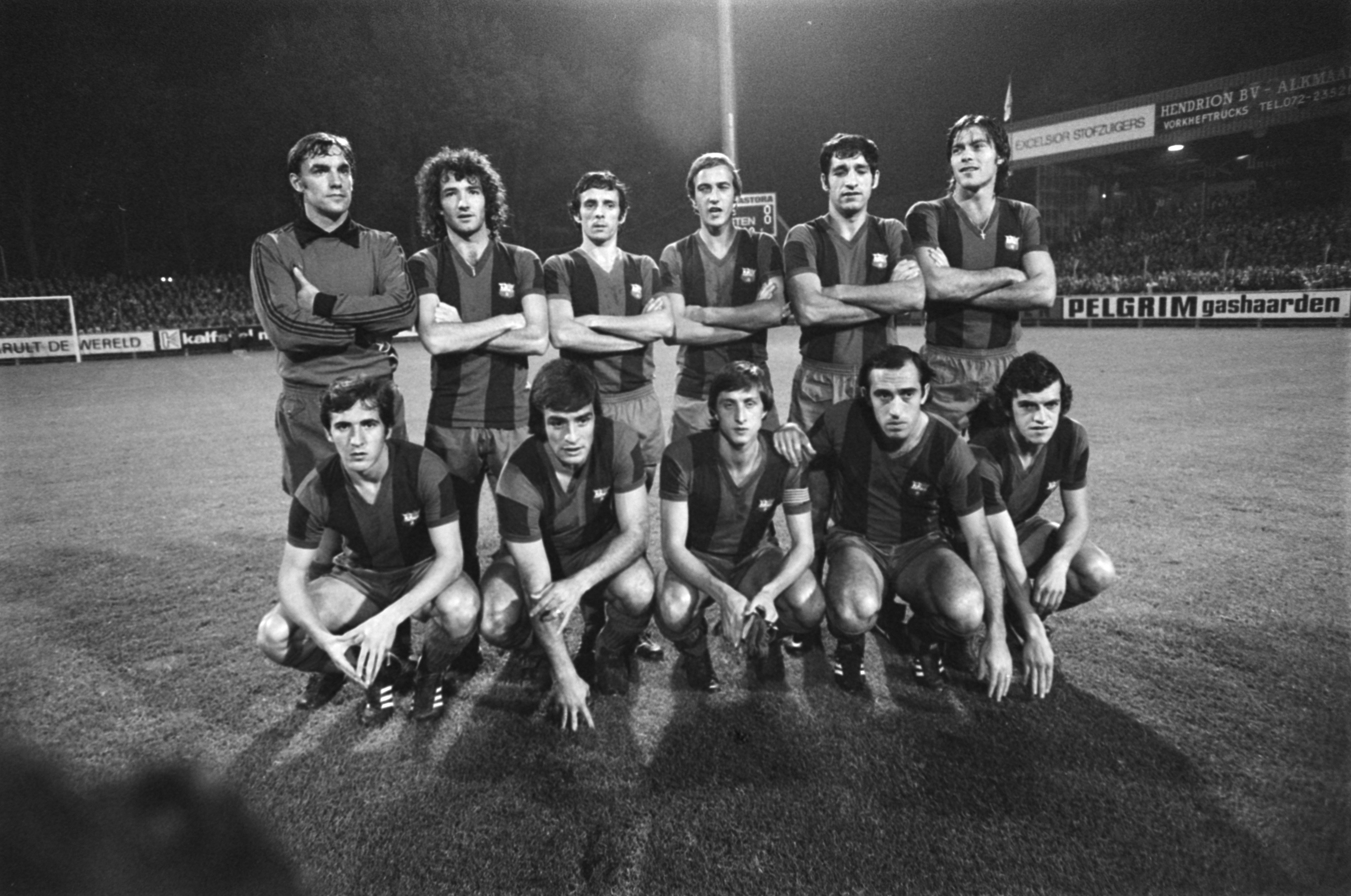
- Artola (standing, first to left) in 1977

Personal information
- Full name: Pedro María Artola Urrutia
- Date of birth: 6 September 1948 (age 78)
- Place of birth: Andoain, Spain
- Height: 1.81 m (5 ft 11 in)
- Position: Goalkeeper

Youth career
- Lengokoak
- Real Sociedad

Senior career*
Years	Team	Apps	(Gls)
1967–1970	San Sebastián		
1970–1975	Real Sociedad	30	(0)
1975–1984	Barcelona	187	(0)
Total		217	(0)

International career
1974–1975	Spain amateur	4	(0)
- * Club domestic league appearances and goals

Pedro María Artola Urrutia (born 6 September 1948) is a Spanish former footballer who played as a goalkeeper.

During his 14-year professional career he represented Real Sociedad and Barcelona, appearing in 217 La Liga matches.

== Club career ==
Born in Andoain, Gipuzkoa, Artola played three full seasons for Real Sociedad's reserves, San Sebastián CF, before joining the first team permanently in 1970. During most of his spell with the Basques he backed up José Ramón Esnaola then Javier Urruticoechea, with 27 of his 30 La Liga appearances coming in 1974–75 as they finished in fourth position with the second-best defensive record (32 goals suffered, to UD Salamanca's 29). The emergence of younger goalkeeper Luis Arconada meant further competition for the starting place within the club.

In 1975, aged almost 27, Artola signed with FC Barcelona, appearing in only 25 league matches in his first two years combined but becoming the starter subsequently. He won the Ricardo Zamora Trophy as the best goalkeeper in 1977–78, adding the campaign's Copa del Rey with the Catalans, one of seven honours with the club – in this competition's round-of-16, in the last minutes of the 8–0 home routing of Getafe Deportivo following a 3–3 away draw, he took a penalty after petition from the Camp Nou faithful, and missed it; he was also in goal in one of the two UEFA Cup Winners' Cup finals won by Barça, the 1979 4–3 win against Fortuna Düsseldorf in Basel.

Former Real Sociedad teammate Urruti signed for Barcelona in 1981, and eventually again won the battle for first-choice with Artola, who only appeared in three games in 1983–84, retiring from football at the age of 35.

== International career ==
Artola was selected by Spain for the UEFA Euro 1980 tournament in Italy, along with Arconada and Urruticoechea. He did not earn any caps for the national side, however.

== Honours ==
Barcelona

- Copa del Rey: 1977–78, 1980–81, 1982–83
- Supercopa de España: 1983
- Copa de la Liga: 1983
- UEFA Cup Winners' Cup: 1978–79, 1981–82

Individual

- Ricardo Zamora Trophy: 1977–78
