= Antonio Olmo =

Spanish footballer and manager

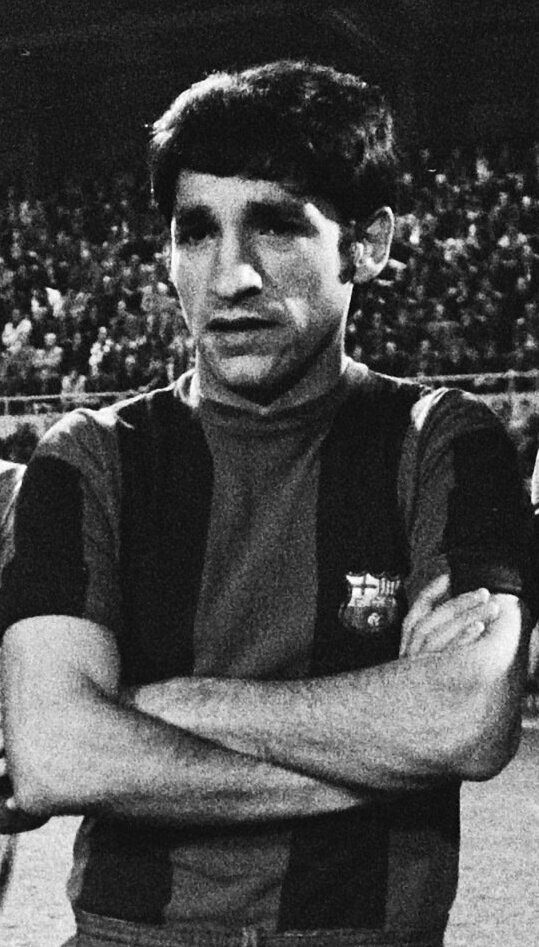
- Olmo (1978)

Personal information
- Full name: Antonio Olmo Ramírez
- Date of birth: 18 January 1954 (age 72)
- Place of birth: Sabadell, Spain
- Height: 1.83 m (6 ft 0 in)
- Position: Defender

Youth career
- Sabadell

Senior career*
| Years | Team | Apps | (Gls) |
| 1971–1976 | Barcelona B | 125 | (9) |
| 1972–1973 | → Calella (loan) | | |
| 1976–1984 | Barcelona | 188 | (4) |
| Total | | 313 | (13) |

International career
| 1971–1972 | Spain U18 | 11 | (0) |
| 1979 | Spain U23 | 5 | (0) |
| 1976 | Spain amateur | 2 | (0) |
| 1977–1980 | Spain | 13 | (0) |

Managerial career
- 1986–1991: Barcelona (youth)
- 1991–1992: Sabadell
- 1994–1996: Sabadell (youth)
- * Club domestic league appearances and goals

Antonio Olmo Ramírez (born 18 January 1954) is a Spanish retired football defender and manager.

== Club career ==
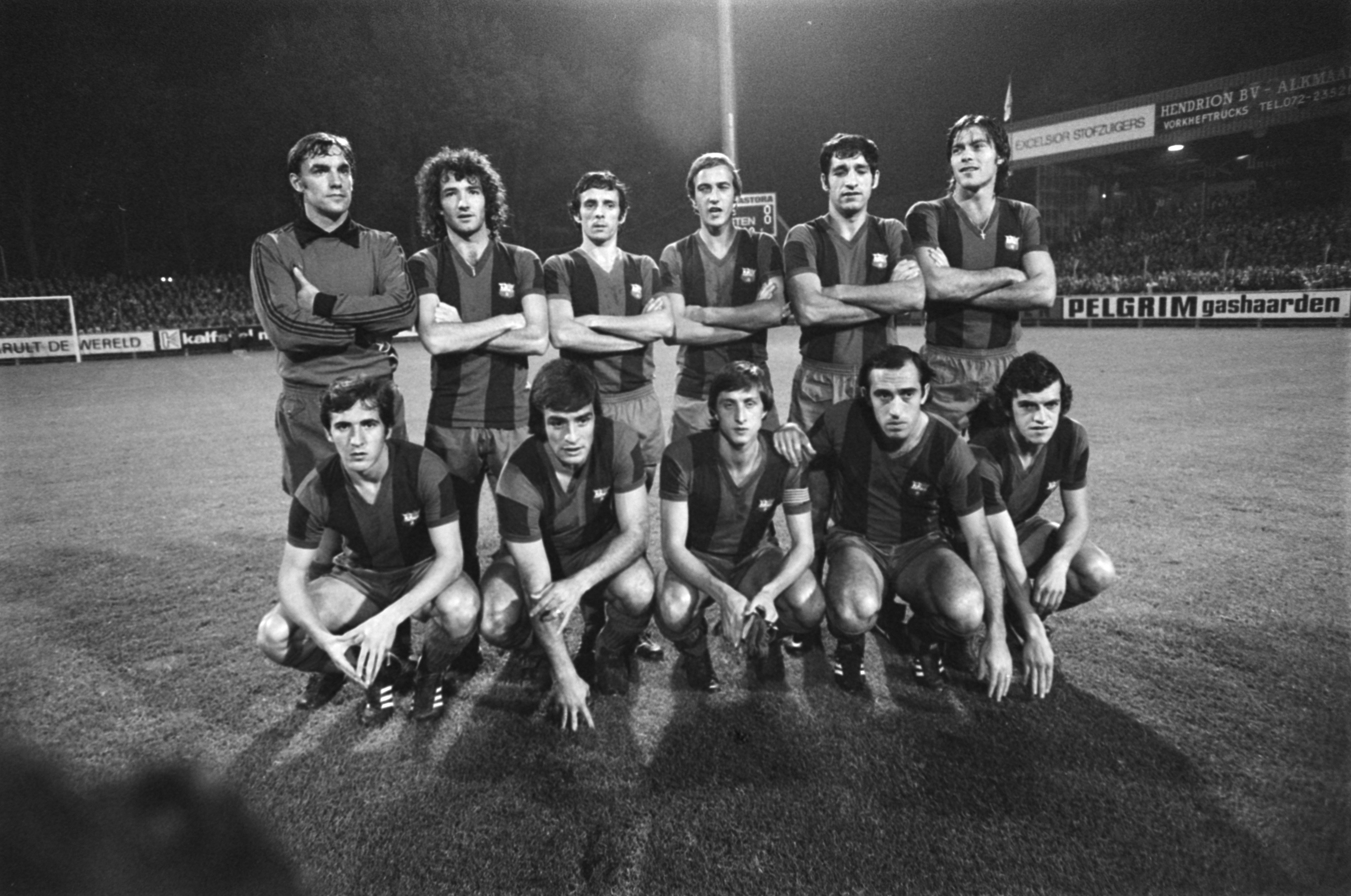
Olmo (standing, second to right) in 1977

Olmo was born in Sabadell, Barcelona, Catalonia. A loan spell with amateurs CF Calella notwithstanding, he played his entire senior career with FC Barcelona, his first two seasons being spent with the B-team in Segunda División. He made his La Liga debut on 5 September 1976 in a 4–0 home win against UD Las Palmas, going on to be first-choice in that and the following five seasons, often partnering Migueli as stopper.

During his spell with the Blaugrana, Olmo won a total of seven major titles, including three Copa del Rey trophies and two UEFA Cup Winners' Cup tournaments, contributing with 16 games and one goal combined to the latter conquests. He retired in June 1984, at the age of only 30.

As a manager, Olmo was connected to two clubs, Barcelona and hometown's CE Sabadell FC, in various levels. In 1991–92, with the latter, he had his first and only experience at the professional level, being one of three coaches during the campaign for the ninth-placed team.

== International career ==
Olmo earned 13 caps for Spain during three years, his debut coming on 9 February 1977 in a 1–0 friendly win in the Republic of Ireland. He was selected to the 1978 FIFA World Cup squad, appearing against Brazil (0–0) and Sweden (1–0 win) in an eventual group stage exit.

Olmo also represented the nation at the 1976 Summer Olympics and UEFA Euro 1980.

== Personal life ==
Olmo's son, Aitor, was also a footballer and a defender. He never played in higher than Segunda División B during his career, representing mainly CE Mataró.

== Honours ==
Barcelona

- Copa del Rey: 1977–78, 1980–81, 1982–83
- Supercopa de España: 1983
- Copa de la Liga: 1983
- UEFA Cup Winners' Cup: 1978–79, 1981–82
