= Tente Sánchez =

Spanish footballer

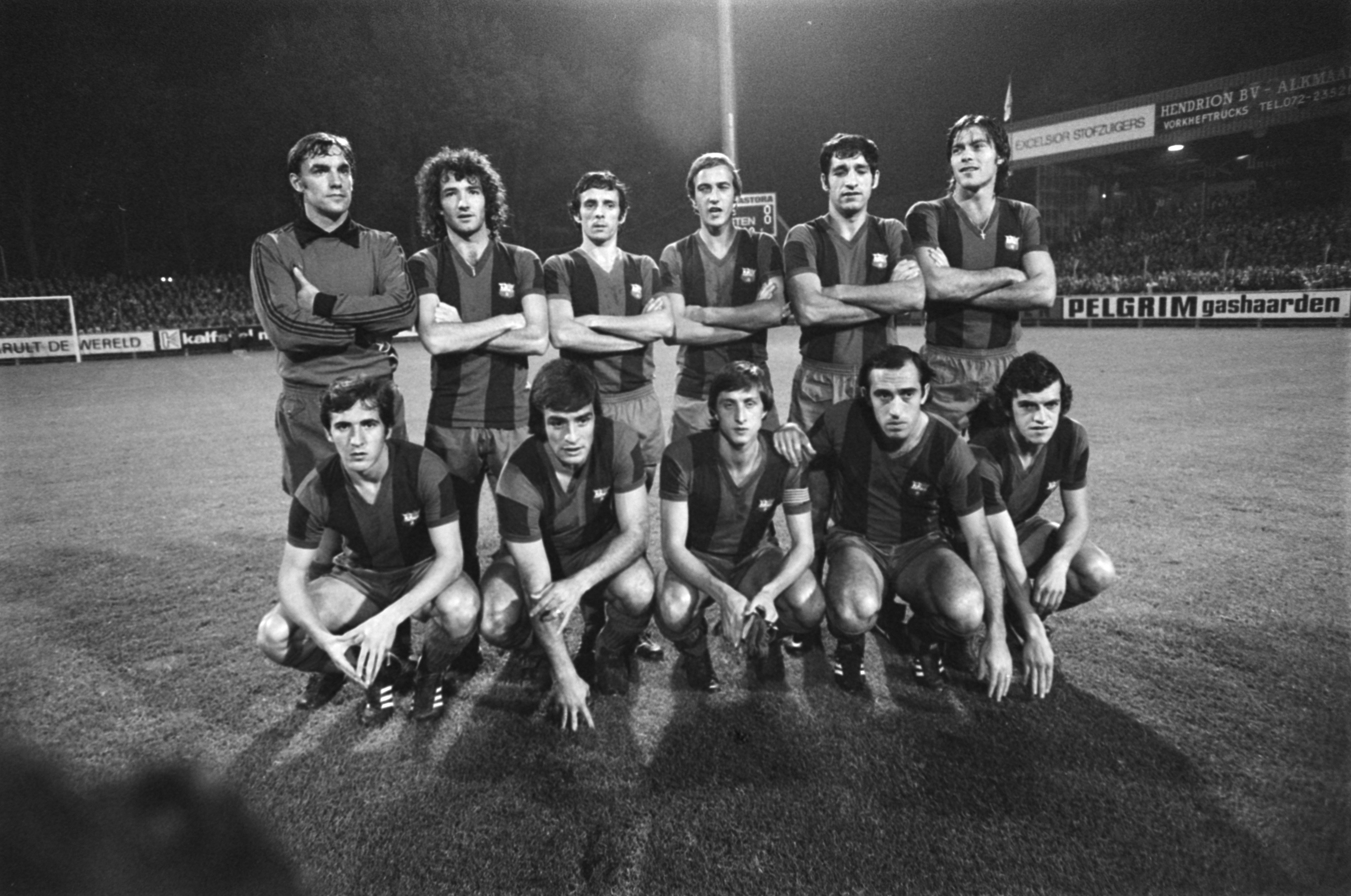
- Sánchez (first row, first to left) in 1977

Personal information
- Full name: José Vicente Sánchez Felip
- Date of birth: 8 October 1956 (age 70)
- Place of birth: Barcelona, Spain
- Height: 1.71 m (5 ft 7 in)
- Position: Midfielder

Youth career
- Artiguenc
- 1974–1975: Barcelona

Senior career*
Years	Team	Apps	(Gls)
1975–1976	Barcelona B	20	(0)
1976–1986	Barcelona	236	(13)
1986–1988	Murcia	70	(2)
1988–1990	Sabadell	51	(2)
Total		377	(17)

International career
1975	Spain U18	2	(0)
1977	Spain U21	3	(0)
1976	Spain amateur	2	(0)
1980–1981	Spain B	2	(0)
1978–1984	Spain	14	(0)
- * Club domestic league appearances and goals

José Vicente "Tente" Sánchez Felip (born 8 October 1956) is a Spanish former professional footballer who played as a midfielder.

== Club career ==
Born in Barcelona, Catalonia, Sánchez adjusted quickly to FC Barcelona's first team, playing four games and scoring once in the 1975–76 season whilst he was still registered with the reserve squad. From there onwards, although never an undisputed starter, he was used regularly, helping the club to three Copa del Rey and two UEFA Cup Winners' Cups; in the first final, he opened a 4–3 win against Fortuna Düsseldorf.

Sánchez and Barça eventually reached another continental final, the 1985–86 European Cup, lost at the Ramón Sánchez Pizjuán Stadium in Seville on penalties to FC Steaua București. By then, he was already a secondary player (totalling just 22 matches in his last two years, although he did contribute 13 La Liga appearances to his only title in the competition), and left for fellow top-flight team Real Murcia in summer 1986, posting two more solid seasons.

Sánchez retired in 1990 aged 33 after representing another Catalan side, CE Sabadell FC of Segunda División. Later that decade, he became a players agent.

== International career ==
Sánchez earned 14 caps for the Spain national team in five years, his debut coming on 4 October 1978 in a 2–1 win in Yugoslavia for the UEFA Euro 1980 qualifiers, replacing Real Madrid's Juanito – who had scored – with five minutes left.

He was selected for the squad at the 1982 FIFA World Cup played in his country, and appeared in four matches as the nation exited in the second group stage.

== Honours ==
Barcelona

- La Liga: 1984–85
- Copa del Rey: 1977–78, 1980–81, 1982–83
- Supercopa de España: 1983
- Copa de la Liga: 1983, 1986
- UEFA Cup Winners' Cup: 1978–79, 1981–82
- European Cup runner-up: 1985–86
