= Bio (footballer) =

Brazilian footballer (1953–2008)

Personal information
- Full name: William Silvio Modesto Veríssimo
- Date of birth: 8 March 1953
- Place of birth: Brazil
- Date of death: 23 February 2008 (aged 54)
- Place of death: Guarulhos, Brazil
- Position: Forward

Youth career
- Palmeiras

Senior career*
Years	Team	Apps	(Gls)
1972	Palmeiras		
1973–1975	Vitória de Setúbal		
1975–1977	Terrassa	96	(31)
1978–1979	Barcelona	9	(3)
1979–1980	Espanyol	14	(2)
1980–1981	Málaga	30	(6)
1981–1982	Sabadell	19	(3)
- * Club domestic league appearances and goals

William Silvio Modesto Veríssimo (8 March 1953 - 23 February 2008) was a Brazilian footballer who last played as a forward for Sabadell.

== Career ==
As a youth player, Bio joined the youth academy of Brazilian side Palmeiras, where he started his senior career, helping the club win the league title. In 1973, he signed for Brazilian side Vitória de Setúbal. Two years later, he signed for Spanish side Terrassa. Subsequently, he signed for Spanish La Liga side Barcelona in 1978, where he made nine league appearances and scored zero goals and helped the club win the 1977–78 Copa del Rey.

One year later, he signed for Spanish side Espanyol. Following his stint there, he signed for Spanish side Málaga in 1980 before signing for Spanish side Sabadell in 1981 and then retiring from professional football.

== Personal life ==
Bio was born on 8 March 1953 in Brazil and was a native of Araraquara, Brazil. Nicknamed "El Perla", he was married to a Spanish woman and was the father of Jonathan, a Spanish footballer. At the age of fifty-four, he died from tuberculosis on 23 February 2008 in Guarulhos, Brazil.
