= Juan Carlos Heredia =

Spanish footballer

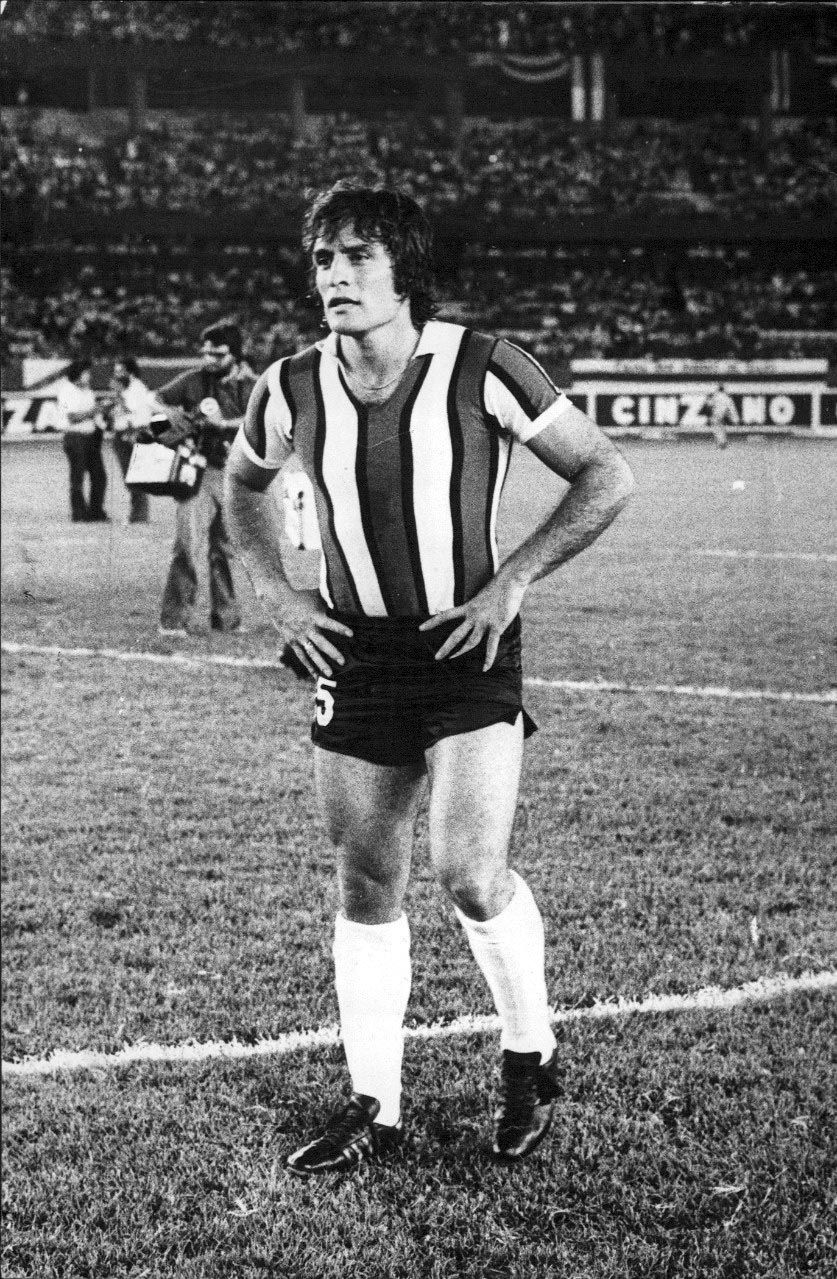
- Heredia with River Plate in 1981

Personal information
- Full name: Juan Carlos Heredia Araya
- Date of birth: May 1, 1952 (age 74)
- Place of birth: Córdoba, Argentina
- Position: Forward

Senior career*
Years	Team	Apps	(Gls)
1970–1971	Belgrano	6	(2)
1972	Rosario Central	13	(3)
1972–1973	FC Porto	5	(2)
1973–1974	Elche CF	24	(7)
1974–1979	Barcelona	74	(17)
1980–81	River Plate	18	(5)
1981	Argentinos Juniors	1	(0)
1982	Talleres de Córdoba	1	(0)

International career
1978–1979	Spain	3	(0)
- * Club domestic league appearances and goals as of January 2015

Juan Carlos Heredia Araya (born 1 May 1952 in Córdoba) is a former football forward. Born in Argentina, he represented the Spain national team. His father, also named Juan Carlos, was a notable forward of the 1940s that was nicknamed "Milonga" and played in Rosario Central, San Lorenzo, and the Argentina national team.

Heredia (nicknamed "Milonguita") gave his first steps on football playing for local team Universitario de Córdoba. His debut in professional football was in 1970 for his home town club Belgrano (then coached by Llamil Simes). Heredia won the Liga Cordobesa title with the club, also scoring the goal for the 1–0 v arch-rival Talleres in the final.

At nacional level, Heredia played with Belgrano the 1971 Nacional championship. His good performances on the field attracted the attention of Rosario Central, which acquired him in 1972 for AR$ 4 million. Nevertheless, he stayed only 4 months in Rosario so that same year he was transferred to Spanish club Barcelona, which loaned him first to FC Porto and then to Elche. Nevertheless, the most remarkable era in Heredia's career was in Barcelona, where he finally debuted in 1974, staying six seasons in the club and winning two titles there.

Barcelona was searching for a forward and they attended to a San Lorenzo v Rosario Central match. They hired me but the Spanish league only allowed two foreign players per club. As Barcelona had acquired Johan Neeskens and Hugo Sotil, I was loaned to Porto.

— Heredia during an interview in 1999

Also in those years Heredia became Spanish national, playing three matches for the Spain national team in 1978–79. In 1980 Heredia returned to Argentine to play for River Plate, where he won two league titles. In River Plate, Heredia was injured in a Copa Libertadores match v Vélez Sarsfield when he suffer the tearing of ligaments. In 1981 he moved to Talleres de Córdoba (recommended by coach Angel Labruna), where he only played 10 minutes before leaving the field. Heredia's leg had not recovered well from surgery, forcing him to leave football definitely.

== Personal life ==
In an interview in 1999, Heredia said that he had earned more than USD 7 million in his career but he lost everything after giving 36 houses and 22 cars to other people. Due to his financial problems, he became a taxi driver in Córdoba.

== Titles ==
Barcelona

- Copa del Rey (1): 1977–78
- UEFA Cup Winners' Cup (1): 1978-79

River Plate

- Primera División (2): 1980 Metropolitano, 1981 Nacional

== See also ==
- List of Spain international footballers born outside Spain
