= 1978–79 European Cup Winners' Cup =

Final positions
- Champions: (Spain) Barcelona (1st title)
- Runners-up: (West Germany) Fortuna Düsseldorf

The 1978–79 season of the European Cup Winners' Cup was won by Barcelona in the final in Basel against Fortuna Düsseldorf. It was the first of four occasions that the Spanish club won the tournament.

No club from Finland, Albania and Turkey joined this season.

== First round ==
Team 1	Agg.	Team 2	1st leg	2nd leg
AZ Alkmaar (Netherlands)	0–2	(England) Ipswich Town	0–0 (Report) (Report 2)	0–2 (Report) (Report 2)
Zagłębie Sosnowiec (Poland)	3–4	(Austria) SSW Innsbruck	2–3 (Report) (Report 2)	1–1 (Report) (Report 2)
RSC Anderlecht (Belgium)	Bye		–	–
Barcelona (Spain)	4–1	(Soviet Union) FC Shakhtar Donetsk	3–0 (Report) (Report 2)	1–1 (Report) (Report 2)
Floriana (Malta)	1–8	(Italy) Internazionale	1–3 (Report) (Report 2)	0–5 (Report) (Report 2)
F.K. Bodø/Glimt (Norway)	4–2	Union Luxembourg	4–1 (Report) (Report 2)	0–1 (Report) (Report 2)
NK Rijeka (Socialist Federal Republic of Yugoslavia)	3–2	(Wales) Wrexham FC	3–0 (Report) (Report 2)	0–2 (Report) (Report 2)
K.S.K. Beveren (Belgium)	6–0	(Northern Ireland) Ballymena United F.C.	3–0 (Report) (Report 2)	3–0 (Report) (Report 2)
Universitatea Craiova (Romania)	4–5	(West Germany) Fortuna Düsseldorf	3–4 (Report) (Report 2)	1–1 (Report) (Report 2)
Marek Stanke Dimitrov (Bulgaria)	3–5	(Scotland) Aberdeen FC	3–2 (Report) (Report 2)	0–3 (Report) (Report 2)
PAOK FC (Greece)	2–4	(Switzerland) Servette FC	2–0 (Report) (Report 2)	0–4 (Report) (Report 2)
BK Frem (Denmark)	2–4	(France) AS Nancy	2–0 (Report) (Report 2)	0–4 (Report) (Report 2)
Valur (Iceland)	1–5	(East Germany) 1. FC Magdeburg	1–1 (Report) (Report 2)	0–4 (Report) (Report 2)
Ferencvárosi TC (Hungary)	4–2	(Sweden) Kalmar FF	2–0 (Report) (Report 2)	2–2 (Report) (Report 2)
Sporting Clube de Portugal	0–2	(Czechoslovakia) Baník Ostrava	0–1 (Report) (Report 2)	0–1 (Report) (Report 2)
Shamrock Rovers F.C. (Republic of Ireland)	3–0	(Cyprus) APOEL FC	2–0 (Report) (Report 2)	1–0 (Report) (Report 2)

=== First leg ===
13 September 1978

AZ Alkmaar (Netherlands)	0–0	(England) Ipswich Town
	Report

Alkmaarderhout, Alkmaar
Attendance: 9,000
Referee: Jan Redelfs (West Germany)

13 September 1978

Zagłębie Sosnowiec (Poland)	2–3	(Austria) SSW Innsbruck
Zarychta 13'; Szaryński 86'	Report	Koncilia 21'; Oberacher 38'; Braschler 81'

Stadion Ludowy, Sosnowiec
Attendance: 6,500
Referee: Lars-Åke Björck (Sweden)

13 September 1978
20:45

Barcelona (Spain)	3–0	(Soviet Union) Shakhtar Donetsk
Krankl 1', 46'; Sánchez 25'	Report

Camp Nou, Barcelona
Attendance: 30,000
Referee: Thomas Reynolds (Wales)

13 September 1978

Floriana (Malta)	1–3	(Italy) Internazionale
Xuereb 48' (pen.)		Altobelli 14' 83' (pen.) 90'

27 August 1978

FK Bodø/Glimt (Norway)	4–1	Union Luxembourg
Hanssen 72' (pen.); Solhaug 85', 86'; Berg 88'	Report	Teitgen 1'

Aspmyra Stadion, Bodø
Attendance: 4,900
Referee: Bent Nielsen (Denmark)

13 September 1978

NK Rijeka (Socialist Federal Republic of Yugoslavia)	3–0	(Wales) Wrexham
Tomić 35'; Durkalić 43'; Cukrov 72'	Report

Stadion Kantrida, Rijeka
Attendance: 7,864
Referee: Paolo Bergamo (Italy)

13 September 1978

K.S.K. Beveren (Belgium)	3–0	(Northern Ireland) Ballymena United
Albert 7'; Stevens 29'; Schönberger 60'	Report

Freethiel Stadion, Beveren
Attendance: 8,078
Referee: César Correia (Portugal)

13 September 1978

Universitatea Craiova (Romania)	3–4	(West Germany) Fortuna Düsseldorf
Cămătaru 13', 57'; Crișan 80'	Report	Zimmermann 24'; Fanz 34', 85'; Allofs 49'

Stadionul Central, Craiova
Attendance: 15,000
Referee: Ertugrul Dilek (Turkey)
13 September 1978

Marek Stanke Dimitrov (Bulgaria)	3–2	(Scotland) Aberdeen
V. Petrov 67'; I. Petrov 70', 89'	Report	Jarvie 6'; Harper 76'

Stadion Bonchuk, Dupnitsa
Attendance: 15,000
Referee: Jacques van Melkebeeke (Belgium)

13 September 1978

PAOK FC (Greece)	2–0	(Switzerland) Servette FC
Kermanidis 77'; Sarafis 87'	Report

Toumba Stadium, Thessaloniki
Attendance: 10,624
Referee: Constantin Bărbulescu (Romania)

13 September 1978

BK Frem (Denmark)	2–0	(France) AS Nancy
Jacobsen 21'; Hansen 82'	Report

Valby Idrætspark, Copenhagen
Referee: Malcolm Moffatt (Northern Ireland)

13 September 1978

Valur (Iceland)	1–1	(East Germany) 1. FC Magdeburg
Albertsson 70' (pen.)	Report	Steinbach 88'

Laugardalsvöllur, Reykjavík
Attendance: 5,600
Referee: Patrick Mulhall (Republic of Ireland)

13 September 1978

Ferencvárosi TC (Hungary)	2–0	(Sweden) Kalmar FF
Nyilasi 16'; Major 43'	Report

Üllői úti Stadion, Budapest
Attendance: 20,000
Referee: Nikolaos Lagogiannis (Greece)

13 September 1978

Sporting CP (Portugal)	0–1	(Czechoslovakia) Baník Ostrava
	Report	Antalík 30'

Estádio José Alvalade, Lisbon
Attendance: 45,000
Referee: Enzo Barbaresco (Italy)

13 September 1978

Shamrock Rovers (Republic of Ireland)	2–0	(Cyprus) APOEL
Giles 44'; Lynex 67'

Glenmalure Park, Dublin
Attendance: 8,000
Referee: Achille Verbecke (France)

=== Second leg ===
27 September 1978

Ipswich Town (England)	2–0	(Netherlands) AZ Alkmaar
Mariner 3'; Wark 89' (pen.)	Report

Portman Road, Ipswich
Attendance: 20,814
Referee: Marcel Van Langenhove (Belgium)

Ipswich Town won 2–0 on aggregate.

27 September 1978

SSW Innsbruck (Austria)	1–1	(Poland) Zagłębie Sosnowiec
Koterwa 11' (o.g.)	Report	Dworczyk 26'

Tivoli, Innsbruck
Attendance: 12,000
Referee: Károly Palotai (Hungary)

SSW Innsbruck won 4–3 on aggregate.

27 September 1978
19:00

Shakhtar Donetsk (Soviet Union)	1–1	(Spain) Barcelona
Reznik 1'	Report	Krankl 34'

Lokomotyv Stadium, Donetsk
Attendance: 45,000
Referee: Ulf Eriksson (Sweden)

Barcelona won 4–1 on aggregate.

27 September 1978

Internazionale (Italy)	5–0	(Malta) Floriana
Muraro 32' 70'; Chierico 33'; Fedele 68' 89'

San Siro, Milan
Attendance: 25,000
Referee: Andreas Kouniaides (Cyprus)

Internazionale won 8–1 on aggregate.

12 September 1978

Union Luxembourg	1–0	(Norway) FK Bodø/Glimt
Teitgen 11'	Report

Stade Achille Hammerel, Luxembourg City
Attendance: 1,800
Referee: Gerard Geurds (Netherlands)

FK Bodø/Glimt won 4–2 on aggregate.

27 September 1978

Wrexham (Wales)	2–0	(Socialist Federal Republic of Yugoslavia) NK Rijeka
McNeil 53'; Cartwright 64'	Report

Racecourse Ground, Wrexham
Attendance: 10,400
Referee: Norbert Rolles (Luxembourg)

NK Rijeka won 3–2 on aggregate.

27 September 1978

Ballymena United (Northern Ireland)	0–3	(Belgium) K.S.K. Beveren
	Report	Janssens 53', 78'; Wißmann 61'

Ballymena Showgrounds, Ballymena
Attendance: 5,000
Referee: Eysteinn Guðmundsson (Iceland)

K.S.K. Beveren won 6–0 on aggregate.

27 September 1978

Fortuna Düsseldorf (West Germany)	1–1	(Romania) Universitatea Craiova
Bommer 39'	Report	Marcu 64'

Rheinstadion, Düsseldorf
Attendance: 7,000
Referee: Dusan Krchnak (Czechoslovakia)

Fortuna Düsseldorf won 5–4 on aggregate.

27 September 1978

Aberdeen (Scotland)	3–0	(Bulgaria) Marek Stanke Dimitrov
Strachan 63'; Jarvie 78'; Harper 81'	Report

Pittodrie Stadium, Aberdeen
Attendance: 20,187
Referee: Jan Keizer (Netherlands)

Aberdeen won 5–3 on aggregate.

27 September 1978

Servette FC (Switzerland)	4–0	(Greece) PAOK FC
Pfister 15'; Hamberg 76'; Elia 86', 89'	Report

Charmilles Stadium, Geneva
Attendance: 12,000
Referee: László Pádár (Hungary)

Servette FC won 4–2 on aggregate.

27 September 1978

AS Nancy (France)	4–0	(Denmark) BK Frem
Curbelo 2'; Jeannol 62', 77'; Zénier 87'	Report

Stade Marcel Picot, Tomblaine
Attendance: 14,508
Referee: Ignacio de Almeira (Portugal)

AS Nancy won 4–2 on aggregate.

27 September 1978

1. FC Magdeburg (East Germany)	4–0	(Iceland) Valur
Seguin 6'; Steinbach 45'; Hoffmann 48'; Streich 70'	Report

Ernst Grube Stadium, Magdeburg
Attendance: 14,000
Referee: Aleksander Suchanek (Poland)

1. FC Magdeburg won 5–1 on aggregate.

27 September 1978

Kalmar FF (Sweden)	2–2	(Hungary) Ferencvárosi TC
Magnusson 19' (pen.); Nyberg 27'	Report	Ebedli 78'; Szokolai 80'

Fredriksskans, Kalmar
Attendance: 2,248
Referee: Anders Mattsson (Finland)

Ferencvárosi TC won 4–2 on aggregate.

27 September 1978

Baník Ostrava (Czechoslovakia)	1–0	(Portugal) Sporting CP
Lička 88'	Report

Bazaly, Ostrava
Attendance: 15,000
Referee: John Hunting (England)

Baník Ostrava won 2–0 on aggregate.

27 September 1978

APOEL (Cyprus)	0–1	(Republic of Ireland) Shamrock Rovers
		Lynex 88'

Makario Stadium, Nicosia
Attendance: 15,000
Referee: Milorad Vlajić (Yugoslavia)

Shamrock Rovers won 3-0 on aggregate.

== Second round ==
Team 1	Agg.	Team 2	1st leg	2nd leg
Ipswich Town (England)	2–1	(Austria) SSW Innsbruck	1–0 (Report) (Report 2)	1–1 (aet) (Report) (Report 2)
RSC Anderlecht (Belgium)	3–3 (1-4p)	(Spain) Barcelona	3–0 (Report) (Report 2)	0–3 (aet) (Report) (Report 2)
Internazionale (Italy)	7–1	(Norway) F.K. Bodø/Glimt	5–0 (Report) (Report 2)	2–1 (Report) (Report 2)
NK Rijeka (Socialist Federal Republic of Yugoslavia)	0–2	(Belgium) K.S.K. Beveren	0–0 (Report) (Report 2)	0–2 (Report) (Report 2)
Fortuna Düsseldorf (West Germany)	3–2	(Scotland) Aberdeen FC	3–0 (Report) (Report 2)	0–2 (Report) (Report 2)
Servette FC (Switzerland)	4–3	(France) AS Nancy	2–1 (Report) (Report 2)	2–2 (Report) (Report 2)
1. FC Magdeburg (East Germany)	2–2 (a)	(Hungary) Ferencvárosi TC	1–0 (Report) (Report 2)	1–2 (Report) (Report 2)
Baník Ostrava (Czechoslovakia)	6–1	(Republic of Ireland) Shamrock Rovers F.C.	3–0 (Report) (Report 2)	3–1 (Report) (Report 2)

=== First leg ===
18 October 1978

Ipswich Town (England)	1–0	(Austria) SSW Innsbruck
Wark 60' (pen.)	Report

Portman Road, Ipswich
Attendance: 23,000
Referee: Augusto Lamo Castillo (Spain)

18 October 1978

R.S.C. Anderlecht (Belgium)	3–0	(Spain) Barcelona
Van der Elst 19', 67'; Coeck 48'	Report

Émile Versé Stadium, Brussels
Attendance: 35,000
Referee: Riccardo Lattanzi (Italy)

18 October 1978

Internazionale (Italy)	5–0	(Norway) F.K. Bodø/Glimt
Beccalossi 25' 57'; Altobelli 60' 86'; Muraro 88'

San Siro, Milan
Attendance: 15,000
Referee: Paul Bonett (Malta)

18 October 1978

NK Rijeka (Socialist Federal Republic of Yugoslavia)	0–0	(Belgium) K.S.K. Beveren
	Report

Stadion Kantrida, Rijeka
Attendance: 3,602
Referee: Nikolaos Lagogiannis (Greece)

18 October 1978

Fortuna Düsseldorf (West Germany)	3–0	(Scotland) Aberdeen
Günther 14', 58'; Zimmermann 83'	Report

Rheinstadion, Düsseldorf
Attendance: 10,000
Referee: Svein Thime (Norway)

18 October 1978

Servette FC (Switzerland)	2–1	(France) AS Nancy
Hamberg 28'; Barberis 58'	Report	Rubio 35'

Charmilles Stadium, Geneva
Attendance: 23,000
Referee: Vojtěch Christov (Czechoslovakia)

18 October 1978

1. FC Magdeburg (East Germany)	1–0	(Hungary) Ferencvárosi TC
Streich 67'	Report

Ernst Grube Stadium, Magdeburg
Attendance: 22,000
Referee: Otto Anderco (Romania)

18 October 1978

Baník Ostrava (Czechoslovakia)	3–0	(Republic of Ireland) Shamrock Rovers
Knapp 5'; Radimec 30'; Rygel 50'	Report

Bazaly, Ostrava
Attendance: 6,500
Referee: Josef Bucek (Austria)

=== Second leg ===
1 November 1978

SSW Innsbruck (Austria)	1–1 (a.e.t.)	(England) Ipswich Town
Oberacher 75'	Report	Burley 100'

Tivoli, Innsbruck
Attendance: 17,500
Referee: Alojzy Jarguz (Poland)

Ipswich Town won 2–1 on aggregate.

1 November 1978

Barcelona (Spain)	3–0 (a.e.t.)	(Belgium) R.S.C. Anderlecht
Krankl 8'; Heredia 44'; Zuviría 86'	Report
Penalties
Krankl (penalty scored); Rexach (penalty scored); Bio (penalty scored); Neeskens (penalty scored)	4–1	(penalty missed) Van der Elst; (penalty missed) Geels; (penalty scored) Thissen

Camp Nou, Barcelona
Attendance: 100,000
Referee: Walter Eschweiler (West Germany)

3–3 on aggregate; FC Barcelona won on penalties.

25 October 1978

F.K. Bodø/Glimt (Norway)	1–2	(Italy) Internazionale
Hansen 40'		Altobelli 45' (pen.); Scanziani 56'

Aspmyra Stadion, Bodø

Internazionale won 7–1 on aggregate.

1 November 1978

K.S.K. Beveren (Belgium)	2–0	(Socialist Federal Republic of Yugoslavia) NK Rijeka
Baecke 20', 65'	Report

Freethiel Stadion, Beveren
Attendance: 11,000
Referee: Thomas Perry (Northern Ireland)

K.S.K. Beveren won 2–0 on aggregate.

1 November 1978

Aberdeen (Scotland)	2–0	(West Germany) Fortuna Düsseldorf
McLelland 54'; Jarvie 57'	Report

Pittodrie Stadium, Aberdeen
Attendance: 16,801
Referee: César Correia (Portugal)

Fortuna Düsseldorf won 3–2 on aggregate.

1 November 1978

AS Nancy (France)	2–2	(Switzerland) Servette FC
Zénier 70' (pen.); Umpiérrez 89'	Report	Elia 68'; Schnyder 76'

Stade Marcel Picot, Tomblaine
Attendance: 18,483
Referee: Tome Manojlovski (Yugoslavia)

Servette FC won 4–3 on aggregate.

1 November 1978

Ferencvárosi TC (Hungary)	2–1	(East Germany) 1. FC Magdeburg
Pusztai 9', 26'	Report	Stahmann 4'

Üllői úti Stadion, Budapest
Attendance: 30,000
Referee: Hilmi Ok (Turkey)

2–2 on aggregate; 1. FC Magdeburg won on away goals.

1 November 1978

Shamrock Rovers (Republic of Ireland)	1–3	(Czechoslovakia) Baník Ostrava
Giles 59'	Report	Lička 37', 66'; Albrecht 46'

Glenmalure Park, Dublin
Attendance: 3,500
Referee: Jan Keizer (Netherlands)

Baník Ostrava won 6–1 on aggregate.

== Quarter-finals ==
Team 1	Agg.	Team 2	1st leg	2nd leg
Ipswich Town (England)	2–2 (a)	(Spain) Barcelona	2–1 (Report) (Report 2)	0–1 (Report) (Report 2)
Internazionale (Italy)	0–1	(Belgium) K.S.K. Beveren	0–0 (Report) (Report 2)	0–1 (Report) (Report 2)
Fortuna Düsseldorf (West Germany)	(a) 1–1	(Switzerland) Servette FC	0–0 (Report) (Report 2)	1–1 (Report) (Report 2)
1. FC Magdeburg (East Germany)	4–5	(Czechoslovakia) Baník Ostrava	2–1 (Report) (Report 2)	2–4 (Report) (Report 2)

=== First leg ===
7 March 1979

Ipswich Town (England)	2–1	(Spain) Barcelona
Gates 51', 64'		Esteban 53'

Ipswich

7 March 1979

Internazionale (Italy)	0–0	(Belgium) K.S.K. Beveren

San Siro, Milan
Attendance: 55,000
Referee: Erich Linemayr (Austria)

7 March 1979

Fortuna Düsseldorf (West Germany)	0–0	(Switzerland) Servette FC

Düsseldorf

7 March 1979

1. FC Magdeburg (East Germany)	2–1	(Czechoslovakia) Baník Ostrava
Streich 4', 30'	Report	Antalík 51'

Ernst Grube Stadium, Magdeburg
Attendance: 12,000
Referee: Nikola Dudin (Bulgaria)

=== Second leg ===
21 March 1979

Barcelona (Spain)	1–0	(England) Ipswich Town
Migueli 38'

Barcelona
Referee: Eldar Azimzade

Barcelona 2–2 Ipswich Town on aggregate. Barcelona won on away goals

21 March 1979

K.S.K. Beveren (Belgium)	1–0	(Italy) Internazionale
Stevens 85'

K.S.K. Beveren won 1–0 on aggregate

21 March 1979

Servette FC (Switzerland)	1–1	(West Germany) Fortuna Düsseldorf
Andrey 80'		Bommer 34'

Geneva

Fortuna Düsseldorf won 1–1 on away goals

21 March 1979

Baník Ostrava (Czechoslovakia)	4–2	(East Germany) 1. FC Magdeburg
Rygel 13', 86'; Albrecht 43'; Němec 60'	Report	Sparwasser 71'; Pommerenke 80'

Bazaly, Ostrava
Attendance: 17,114
Referee: John Carpenter (Ireland)

Baník Ostrava won 5–4 on aggregate.

== Semi-finals ==
Team 1	Agg.	Team 2	1st leg	2nd leg
Barcelona (Spain)	2–0	(Belgium) K.S.K. Beveren	1–0	1–0
Fortuna Düsseldorf (West Germany)	4–3	(Czechoslovakia) Baník Ostrava	3–1	1–2

=== First leg ===
11 April 1979

Barcelona (Spain)	1–0	(Belgium) K.S.K. Beveren
Rexach 65' (pen.)	Report Report 2

Camp Nou
Attendance: 70,000
Referee: John Carpenter (Ireland)
11 April 1979

Fortuna Düsseldorf (West Germany)	3–1	(Czechoslovakia) Banik Ostrava
K. Allofs 54', 66'; T. Allofs 90'	Report Report 2	Nemec 11'

Rheinstadion
Attendance: 18,000
Referee: Lamo Castillo (Spain)

=== Second leg ===
25 April 1979

K.S.K. Beveren (Belgium)	0–1	(Spain) Barcelona
	Report Report 2	Krankl 87' (pen.)

Beveren
Attendance: 25,000
Referee: Pat Partridge (England)

Barcelona won 2–0 on aggregate.

25 April 1979

Banik Ostrava (Czechoslovakia)	2–1	(West Germany) Fortuna Düsseldorf
Licka 62'; Antalik 88'	Report Report 2	Zewe 27'

Bazaly
Attendance: 33,000

Fortuna Düsseldorf won 4–3 on aggregate.

== Final ==
16 May 1979
19:15

Fortuna Düsseldorf (West Germany)	3–4 (a.e.t.)	(Spain) Barcelona
T. Allofs 8'; Seel 41' 114'	Report; Report 2	Sánchez 5'; Asensi 34'; Rexach 104'; Krankl 111'

St. Jakob Stadium, Basel
Attendance: 58,000
Referee: Károly Palotai (Hungary)

== See also ==
- 1978–79 European Cup
- 1978–79 UEFA Cup
