= List of Sporting de Gijón records and statistics =

Sporting de Gijón is a football club from Gijón, Spain. They have finished runner-up in La Liga one occasion, and were beaten finalists in the Copa del Rey on two occasions. Real Sporting also won the Segunda División five times.

== Honours ==
=== National titles ===
- La Liga
  - Runners-up: 1978–79
- Copa del Rey:
  - Runners-up: 1981, 1982
- Segunda División: (5) 1943–44, 1950–51, 1956–57, 1969–70, 1976–77
  - Runners-up: 1929–30, 2014–15

=== Regional titles ===
- Asturian Championship: 1916–17, 1917–18, 1918–19, 1919–20, 1920–21, 1921–22, 1922–23, 1923–24, 1925–26, 1926–27, 1929–30, 1930–31, 1939–40

=== Friendly tournaments ===
- Ramón de Carranza Trophy: 1984
- Trofeo Villa de Gijón: 1996, 2001, 2002, 2008, 2014, 2015, 2016
- Trofeo Costa Verde: 1962, 1963, 1965, 1970, 1972, 1975–1979, 1984–1986, 1988–1992
- Trofeo Principado: 1988, 1991, 1993, 1994, 2006
- Trofeo Ciudad de Pamplona: 1979
- Torneo Ciudad de León: 1997
- Trofeo Presidente - Ciudad de Oviedo: 1980, 1986
- Trofeo Ciudad del Cid: 1981
- Trofeo Ibérico: 1972, 1979
- Trofeo Conde de Fontao: 1969-1971, 1974, 1977, 1989
- Trofeo Emma Cuervo: 1957, 1960, 1963, 1967, 1972, 2007, 2012
- Trofeo Ramón Losada: 1997, 1998, 1999, 2001, 2004, 2008, 2009, 2010
- Trofeo Concepción Arenal: 1970, 1971
- Trofeo Luis Otero: 2003, 2008

=== Youth football ===
- Copa de Campeones: 2004
  - Runners-up: 2005, 2018
- División de Honor Juvenil de Fútbol (group): (4) 2003–04, 2004–05, 2011–12, 2017–18
- Copa del Rey Juvenil de Fútbol:
  - Runners-up: 2005
- Under-16 Spanish Championship: 2000
- Under-10 Spanish Championship: 2010, 2012, 2018, 2019

== Individual honours ==
=== Pichichi Trophy ===
In Spanish football, the Pichichi Trophy is awarded by Spanish sports newspaper 'Marca' to the top goalscorer for each league season.

Primera División

Season	Player	Country	Goals
1973–74	Quini	Spain	20
1975–76	Quini	Spain	18
1979–80	Quini	Spain	24

Segunda División

Season	Player	Country	Goals
1956–57	Ricardo	Spain	46
1966–67	Solabarrieta	Spain	24
1969–70	Quini	Spain	24
1976–77	Quini	Spain	27

=== Zamora Trophy ===
In Spanish football, the Zamora Trophy is awarded by Spanish sports newspaper Marca to the goalkeeper who has the lowest "goals-to-games" ratio for each league season.

Primera División

Season	Player	Nationality	GP	GC	Avg.
1984–85	Ablanedo II	Spain	33	22	0.66
1985–86	Ablanedo II	Spain	34	27	0.79
1989–90	Ablanedo II	Spain	31	25	0.80

Segunda División

Season	Player	Nationality	GP	GC	Avg.
2005–06	Roberto	Spain	38	31	0.82
2014–15	Cuéllar	Spain	36	21	0.58

=== Segunda División Player of the Month ===
Month	Player
Sep 2013	(Serbia) Stefan Šćepović
Mar 2018	(Spain) Jony
Sep 2020	(Serbia) Uroš Đurđević

=== Segunda División Manager of the Month ===
Month	Player
Sep 2014	(Spain) Abelardo

== Players ==
=== Appearances ===
- Youngest first-team player (in national competition): Eloy Olaya at 15 years, 141 days (0–4 win v Turón, Copa del Rey, 28 November 1979)
- Youngest La Liga players^{1}:
  - Emilio Blanco: 17 years, 295 days (1–1 v Athletic Bilbao, La Liga, 31 October 1982)
  - Juan Muñiz: 18 years, 63 days (0–2 loss v Racing Santander, La Liga, 16 May 2010)
  - Sergio Álvarez: 18 years, 113 days (0–2 loss v Racing Santander, La Liga, 16 May 2010)
- Oldest La Liga player: Molinucu at 38 years, 130 days (3–5 loss v Racing Santander, La Liga, 26 April 1954)

(1) Not considering players from youth ranks called up during the footballers' strikes of 1981 and 1984.

==== Most appearances in La Liga ====
Name	La Liga seasons	Years	Apps	Minutes	Goals
(Spain) Joaquín Alonso	1977–92	15	479	41,736	65
(Spain) Manolo Jiménez	1979–91	12	420	37,479	8
(Spain) Juan Carlos Ablanedo	1982–98	16	399	35,447	0
(Spain) Quini	1970–76 / 1977–80 / 1984–87	12	348	28,024	165
(Spain) Jesús Castro	1970–76 / 1977–84	14	315	28,314	0
(Spain) Manuel Mesa	1975–76 / 1977–87	11	311	24,943	34
(Spain) Cundi	1974–76 / 1977–89	16	310	25,656	9
(Spain) Ciriaco	1971–76 / 1977–83	11	264	20,937	24
(Spain) José Antonio Redondo	1972–76 / 1977–85	12	242	20,214	3
(Argentina) Enzo Ferrero	1975–76 / 1977–85	9	239	20,005	53

=== Top goalscorers in La Liga ===
As of August 2010

Name	La Liga Seasons	Years	Min	Goals	MPG
(Spain) Quini	1970–76 / 1977–80 / 1984–87	12	28,024	165	169.8
(Spain) Joaquín Alonso	1977–92	15	41,736	65	642.1
(Argentina) Enzo Ferrero	1975–76 / 1977–85	9	20,085	54	371.9
(Spain) Pío Alonso	1944–48	4	6,840	44	155.5
(Spain) José Luis Ortiz	1951–54 / 1957–59	5	10,620	40	265.5
(Spain) Abel	1977–84	7	12,766	40	319.2
(Spain) Eloy Olaya	1982–88 / 1995–97	8	17,819	39	456.9
(Spain) José Ignacio Churruca	1970–76	6	16.676	37	450.8
(Spain) Francisco Sánchez	1945–48 / 1951–54 / 1957–59	8	14,709	35	420.3
(Spain) Manuel Mesa	1975–76 / 1977–87	11	24,866	34	731,4

=== Player of the season ===
The following players have been awarded 'El Molinón de Plata' since its creation in 1967, given to the best player of the season by the Federation of Sporting Gijón Supporters Clubs:

Season	Level	Player	Apps	Minutes	Goals
1966–1967	2	(Spain) Miguel Alonso	24	2160	1
1967–1968	2	(Spain) Alberto	25	2250	2
1968–1969	2	(Spain) Florín	33	2970	0
1969–1970	1	(Spain) Antonio Puente	38	3330	2
1970–1971	1	(Spain) Jesús Castro	25	2250	0
		(Spain) Carlos García Cuervo	5	450	0
1971–1972	1	(Spain) José Ignacio Churruca	33	2815	8
1972–1973	1	(Spain) Jesús Castro (2)	32	2873	0
1973–1974	1	(Spain) Quini	34	3013	20
1974–1975	1	(Spain) José Manuel	32	2880	0
1975–1976	1	(Spain) Alfonso Fanjul	31	2616	0
1976–1977	2	(Spain) Jesús Castro (3)	38	3420	0
1977–1978	1	(Argentina) Enzo Ferrero	34	2951	8
1978–1979	1	(Spain) Quini (2)	33	2879	23
1979–1980	1	(Spain) Francisco Javier Uría	33	2917	0
1980–1981	1	(Spain) Cundi	33	2801	5
1981–1982	1	(Spain) José Antonio Redondo	33	2889	0
1982–1983	1	(Spain) Antonio Maceda	30	2700	5
1983–1984	1	(Spain) Antonio Maceda (2)	30	2682	5
1984–1985	1	(Spain) Ablanedo II	33	2914	0
1985–1986	1	(Spain) Joaquín Alonso	34	3055	8
1986–1987	1	(Spain) Manuel Jiménez	43	3870	1
1987–1988	1	(Spain) Joaquín Alonso (2)	38	3420	15
1988–1989	1	(Spain) Manuel Jiménez (2)	37	3330	1
1989–1990	1	(Spain) Ablanedo II (2)	31	2762	0
1990–1991	1	(Spain) Ablanedo II (3)	32	2880	0
1991–1992	1	(Spain) Emilio Isierte	38	3420	0
1992–1993	1	(Spain) Abelardo	37	3272	3
1993–1994	1	(Spain) Abelardo (2)	36	3209	5
1994–1995	1	(Spain) Ablanedo II (4)	34	3003	0
1995–1996	1	(Spain) Ablanedo II (5)	36	3132	0
1996–1997	1	(Spain) Ablanedo II (6)	40	3555	0
1997–1998	1	The supporters^{*}
1998–1999	2	(Spain) José Manuel	24	1870	1
1999–2000	2	(Equatorial Guinea) Yago	32	2584	0
2000–2001	2	(Spain) Pablo Amo	36	3098	3
2001–2002	2	(Spain) David Villa	40	3129	18
2002–2003	2	(Spain) Dani Borreguero	36	3228	2
2003–2004	2	(Spain) Samuel	38	3074	0
2004–2005	2	(Spain) Irurzun	38	2863	13
2005–2006	2	(Spain) Roberto	38	3420	0
2006–2007	2	(Colombia) Edwin Congo	34	2690	11
2007–2008	2	(Spain) Kike Mateo	34	2706	12
2008–2009	1	(Spain) Diego Castro	32	2618	6
2009–2010	1	(Spain) Alberto Rivera	34	3060	1
2010–2011	1	(Spain) Alberto Lora	36	3172	5
2011–2012	1	(Spain) Juan Pablo	37	3330	0
2012–2013	2	(Spain) Iván Cuéllar	23	1939	0
2013–2014	2	(Spain) Sergio Álvarez	29	2494	2
2014–2015	2	(Colombia) Bernardo	41	3690	1
2015–2016	1	(Spain) Jorge Meré	25	2172	0
2017–2018	2	(Spain) Diego Mariño	43	3870	0
2018–2019	2	(Spain) Diego Mariño (2)	37	3308	0
2019–2020	2	(Spain) Diego Mariño (3)	42	3780	0
2020–2021	2	(Montenegro) Uroš Đurđević	39	3442	22

Đurđević (*) Following the disastrous 1997–98 campaign, the prize was not given to any player.

== Team statistics ==
=== In La Liga ===
As of 20 May 2017

- Seasons: 42
- Position in All-time La Liga table: 15th

Overall							Home					Away				
Pld	W^{3p}	D	L	GF	GA	Pts	W^{3p}	D	L	GF	GA	W^{3p}	D	L	GF	GA
1,458	471^{89}	358	629	1,753	2,152	1,389	358^{63}	177	194	1,138	792	113^{26}	181	435	615	1,360

==== Records ====
- Highest final position: 2nd (1978–79)
- Lowest final position: 20th (1997–98)
- Most points in a season: 50 (1996–97)
- Fewest points in a season: 13 (1997–98)
- Most consecutive seasons in La Liga: 21 (from 1977–78 to 1997–98)
- Few consecutive seasons in La Liga: 2 (from 1957–58 to 1958–59 and from 2015–16 to 2016–17)
- Record home win: 7–1 vs Osasuna (1993–94, round 19, 16 January 1994)
- Record away win: 0–4 at Barcelona (1986–87, round 29, 28 February 1987) and at Mallorca (2010–11, round 21, 29 January 2011)
- Record home loss: 2–7 vs Atlético Madrid (1947–48, round 26, 11 April 1948) and 1–6 vs Barcelona (2008–09, round 3, 21 September 2008)
- Record away loss: 9–0 at Barcelona (1951–52, round 22, 10 February 1952) and at Athletic Bilbao (1958–59, round 15, 28 December 1958)

==== Games ====
- First game: 0–0 v Español (1944–45, round 1, 24 September 1944)
- 500th game: 0–0 at Las Palmas (1978–79, round 12, 2 February 1978)
- 1,000th game: 2–1 at Real Burgos (1992–93, round 6, 7 October 1992)
- Last game: 2–2 v Real Betis (2016–17, round 38, 20 May 2017)

==== Goals ====
- First goal: Gundemaro (3–3 v Deportivo, 1944–45, round 2, 1 October 1944)
- 100th goal: Dindurra (1–4 v Sevilla, 1946–47, round 11)
- 500th goal: Megido (2–2 at Real Madrid, 1973–74, round 17)
- 1,000th goal: Jaime (4–1 v Murcia, 1986–87, round 5)
- 1,500th goal: Rodrigão (2–1 v Racing Santander, 1997–98, round 24)
- Last goal: Carlos Carmona (2–2 v Real Betis, 2016–17, round 38)
- Youngest goalscorer: Eloy at 19 years, 112 days (2–1 v Osasuna, 1983–84, 30 October 1983)
- Oldest goalscorer: Quini at 37 years, 131 days (1–1 v Real Zaragoza, 1986–87, 1 February 1987)

==== Streaks ====
- Winning: 7 (1979–80, round 1 to 7)
  - Winning at home: 12 (1977–78, round 29 to 1978–79, round 17)
  - Winning away: 3 (three times)
- Unbeaten: 14 (1981–82, round 34 to 1982–83, round 13)
  - Unbeaten at home: 27 (1977–78, round 8 to 1978–79, round 25)
  - Unbeaten away: 9 (1984–85, round 11 to 29)
- Scoring: 18 (1946–47, round 8 to 25)
  - Scoring at home: 26 (1946–47, round 2 to 1947–48, round 26)
  - Scoring away: 13 (1991–92, round 32 to 1992–93, round 17)
- Without goals against: 7 (1991–92, round 6 to 12)
  - Without goals against at home: 9 (1984–85, round 22 to 1985–86, round 6)
  - Without goals against away: 4 (two times)
- Draws streak: 6 (1982–83, round 5 to 10)
  - Draws streak at home: 4 (1991–92, round 37 to 1992–93, round 5)
  - Draws streak away: 4 (1982–83, round 6 to 12)
- Games without winning: 24 (1996–97, round 42 to 1997–98, round 23)
  - Games without winning at home: 11 (1997–98, round 2 to 22)
  - Games without winning away: 34 (1974–75, round 4 to 1977–78, round 1)
- Losing: 10 (1953–54, round 13 to 22)
  - Losing at home: 7 (1997–98, round 2 to 14)
  - Losing away: 12 (1953–54, round 8 to 29)
- Without scoring: 5 (three times)
  - Without scoring at home: 4 (1989–90, round 28 to 34)
  - Without scoring away: 8 (1995–96, round 7 to 21)
- With goals against: 29 (1997–98, round 1 to 29)
  - With goals against at home: 18 (1947–48, round 9 to 1951–52, round 16)
  - With goals against away: 27 (1947–48, round 22 to 1952–53, round 20)

=== In Segunda División ===
As of 2 June 2019

- Seasons: 46

Overall
Pld	W^{3p}	D	L	GF	GA	Pts
1,424	657^{251}	344	423	2,412	1,736	1,909

==== Records ====
- Highest final position: 1st (1941–42, 1942–43, 1943–44, 1950–51, 1956–57, 1969–70, 1976–77)
- Lowest final position: 13th (1960–61, 1961–62, 2006–07)
- Most consecutive seasons in Segunda División: 13 (from 1929 to 1943–44)
- Few consecutive seasons in Segunda División: 1 (1976–77)
- Record win: 11–0 vs Lleida (1956–57)
- Record away win: 2–7 at Ilicitano (1969–70)
- Record home loss: 0–6 vs Oviedo (1955–56)
- Record away loss: 6–0 at Alavés (1929), at Osasuna (1933–34) and at Racing Santander (1962–63)

=== In Copa del Rey ===
- Participations: 87 (first in 1917)
- Best performance: Runner-up (1980–81 and 1981–82)
- Times semifinalist: 9
  - Last one: 1994–95 v Deportivo
- Times quarterfinalist: 16 (5 as Segunda División team)
  - Last one: 2008–09 v Athletic
- First game: 0–1 v Arenas Getxo (1917, first leg of the quarterfinals, 11 March 1917)

=== In UEFA Cup ===
- Participations: 6
- Best performance: Round of 32 (1978–79 and 1991–92)

Overall						Home					Away				
Pld	W	D	L	GF	GA	W	D	L	GF	GA	W	D	L	GF	GA
16	4	4	8	13	18	4	2	2	11	6	0	2	6	2	12

- Top goalscorers:
  - Enzo Ferrero (3)
  - Milan Luhový and Enrique Morán (2)

==== Records ====
- Record home win: 3–0 v Torino (1978–79, first leg of the Round of 64, 13 September 1978)
- Record home loss: 1–2 v Köln (1985–86, second leg of the Round of 64) and 0–1 v Crvena Zvezda (1978–79, first leg of the Round of 32)
- Record away loss: 3–0 at Milan (1987–88, second leg of the Round of 64, 30 September 1987)

==== Goals ====
- First goal: Ferrero (3–0 v Torino, UEFA Cup, first leg of the Round of 64, 13 September 1978)

== Penalty shootouts ==
=== By competition ===
Competition	Pld	W	L
Copa del Rey	10	5	5
UEFA Cup	1	1	0
Total	11	6	5

=== Complete list ===
Key

- (penalty scored) = scored penalty
- golden background = scored penalty which ended the shoot-out
- (penalty missed) = missed penalty
- red background = missed penalty which ended the shoot-out
- grey background = the first penalty in the shoot-out
- horizontal line within a list of takers = beginning of the sudden death stage

Penalty shoot-outs played by Real Sporting
#	Home team	F	Visitor	Penalties			Home team		Visitor		Competition	Venue	Date
#	Home team	F	Visitor	S	M	T	GK	Takers	Takers	GK	Competition	Venue	Date
1	Las Palmas	2–1	Real Sporting	4–3	2–3	6–6	Catalá	Martín (penalty missed); Germán (penalty scored); León (penalty missed); Miguel Ángel (penalty scored) (penalty scored) Gilberto (penalty scored)	(penalty scored) Ciriaco; (penalty scored) Valdés; (penalty missed) Churruca; (penalty scored) Piñel; (penalty missed) José Manuel (penalty missed) Pascual	Castro	1973–74 Copa del Rey; Fifth round	Insular; Las Palmas	March 27, 1974
2	Real Sporting	2–3	Levante	3–2	2–3	5–5	Abelardo	Ciriaco (penalty missed); De Diego (penalty missed); Garzón (penalty scored); Quini (penalty scored); Megido (penalty scored)	(penalty missed) Lacruz; (penalty scored) Balciscueta; (penalty scored) Guri; (penalty missed) Zunzunegui; (penalty missed) Álvarez	Pons-Gimeno	1974–75 Copa del Rey; Fourth round	El Molinón; Gijón	February 26, 1975
3	Valencia	1–1	Real Sporting	1–4	2–0	3–4	Ablanedo II	Ribes (penalty scored); Urruti (penalty missed); Sixto (penalty missed)	(penalty scored) Eloy; (penalty scored) Jiménez; (penalty scored) Zurdi; (penalty scored) Quini	Bermell	1984–85 Copa del Rey; Round of 16	Luis Casanova; Valencia	April 3, 1985
4	Real Sporting	1–1	Racing Santander	1–3	3–1	4–4	Ablanedo II	Jiménez (penalty scored); Flores (penalty missed); Villa (penalty missed); Marcelino (penalty missed)	(penalty scored) Gelucho; (penalty scored) Isidro; (penalty scored) Buckley; (penalty missed) Tino	Liaño	1986–87 Copa del Rey; Second round	El Molinón; Gijón	October 1, 1986
5	Real Sporting	0–0	Elche	3–1	1–3	4–4	Ablanedo II	Eraña (penalty scored); Emilio (penalty scored); Villa (penalty scored); Narciso (penalty missed)	Crespín (penalty scored); Tino (penalty missed); Robi (penalty missed); Bellido (penalty missed)	Miguel	1989–90 Copa del Rey; Second round	El Molinón; Gijón	October 25, 1989
6	(Socialist Federal Republic of Yugoslavia) Partizan	2–0	Real Sporting	2–3	3–1	5–4	Omerović	Mijatović (penalty missed); Krčmarević (penalty scored); Zahovič (penalty scored); Gudelj (penalty missed); Novak (penalty missed)	Avelino (penalty scored); Joaquín (penalty scored); Arturo (penalty scored); Luhový (penalty missed)	Emilio	1991–92 UEFA Cup; Round of 64	İnönü (Turkey) Istanbul	October 2, 1991
7	Real Sporting	0–0	Ourense	4–3	1–2	5–5	Sergio Sánchez	Mario (penalty missed)	(penalty missed) Nando; (penalty missed) Morán	Ramón	1998–99 Copa del Rey; Second round	El Molinón; Gijón	October 7, 1998
8	Real Sporting	1–1	Las Palmas	4–5	2–1	6–6	Juanjo	Rubén (penalty missed); Álex (penalty missed)	(penalty missed) Paqui	Cicović	2000–01 Copa del Rey; Round of 64	El Molinón; Gijón	December 13, 2000
9	Real Sporting	1–1	Recreativo	2–4	2–1	4–5	Cuéllar	Barral (penalty scored); De las Cuevas (penalty missed); Luis Morán (penalty scored); Carmelo (penalty missed)	(penalty scored) Álvaro Antón; (penalty missed) Javi Fuego; (penalty scored) Emilio Sánchez; (penalty scored) Poli; (penalty scored) Aitor	Bernardo	2009–10 Copa del Rey; Round of 32	El Molinón; Gijón	November 10, 2009
10	Real Sporting	1–1	Numancia	1–3	3–1	4–4	Dani	Álex López (penalty missed); Moi Gómez (penalty missed); Santos (penalty scored); Álex Pérez (penalty missed)	(penalty scored) Del Moral; (penalty missed) Medina; (penalty scored) Pere Milla; (penalty scored) Nacho	Munir	2017–18 Copa del Rey; Second round	El Molinón; Gijón	September 19, 2017
11	Rayo Majadahonda	1–1	Real Sporting	3–4	3–2	6–6	Ander	Galán (penalty scored); Enzo (penalty missed); Fede Varela (penalty missed); Jeisson (penalty scored); Iza (penalty scored) Schiappacasse (penalty missed)	(penalty missed) Pedro Díaz; (penalty scored) Javi Noblejas; (penalty scored) Isma Cerro; (penalty scored) Morilla; (penalty missed) Manzambi (penalty scored) Nacho Méndez	Dani	2018–19 Copa del Rey; Third round	Wanda Metropolitano; Madrid	October 18, 2018
