= 1978–79 Sporting de Gijón season =

Real Sporting
1978–79 season
- President: Manuel Vega-Arango Alvaré
- Manager: Vicente Miera
- Stadium: El Molinón
- 1978–79: 2nd
- Copa del Rey: Third round
- Top goalscorer: Quini (23 goals)
Home colours	Away colours

The 1978–79 Sporting de Gijón season was the 19th season of the club in La Liga, the second in a row since the last promotion. This was the best season in the club's history, after finishing the league as runner-up and making its debut in European competitions.

== Technical staff ==
Position	Staff
Manager	Vicente Miera

== Competitions ==
=== La Liga ===
==== League table ====
Pos	Team	Pld	W	D	L	GF	GA	GD	Pts	Qualification or relegation
1	Real Madrid (C)	34	16	15	3	61	36	+25	47	Qualification for the European Cup first round
2	Sporting Gijón	34	17	9	8	50	35	+15	43	Qualification for the UEFA Cup first round
3	Atlético Madrid	34	14	13	7	55	37	+18	41	Qualification for the UEFA Cup first round
4	Real Sociedad	34	18	5	11	53	36	+17	41	Qualification for the UEFA Cup first round
5	Barcelona	34	16	6	12	69	37	+32	38	Qualification for the Cup Winners' Cup first round (Note: Valencia qualified to the Cup Winners' Cup as winners of the Copa del Rey and Barcelona as title holders of the competition.)

Source: BDFútbol
Rules for classification: 1) Points; 2) Head-to-head results; 3) Goal difference; 4) Number of goals scored
(C) Champions

==== Positions by round ====
Round	1	2	3	4	5	6	7	8	9	10	11	12	13	14	15	16	17	18	19	20	21	22	23	24	25	26	27	28	29	30	31	32	33	34
Ground	H	A	H	A	H	A	H	A	H	A	H	A	H	A	H	A	H	A	H	A	H	A	H	A	H	A	H	A	H	A	H	A	H	A
Result	W	L	W	L	W	D	W	L	W	L	W	D	W	W	W	D	W	D	D	W	W	L	W	W	W	D	L	L	W	D	W	D	D	L
Position	1	6	5	8	6	5	4	8	5	8	6	5	3	2	2	2	2	2	2	3	1	1	1	1	1	1	2	2	2	2	2	2	2	2

Source: www.lfp.es
A = Away; H = Home; W = Win; D = Draw; L = Loss

==== Matches ====
2 September 1978 1	Real Sporting	4–1	Atlético Madrid	Gijón
	Rezza 46'; Quini 50', 55'; Ferrero 65'	Summary	Marcial 11'	Stadium: El Molinón; Referee: Ausocúa Sanz

9 September 1978 2	Español	1–0	Real Sporting	Barcelona
	José Manuel 40'	Summary		Stadium: Sarrià; Referee: Condón Uriz

17 September 1978 3	Real Sporting	1–0	Zaragoza	Gijón
	Quini 85'	Summary		Stadium: El Molinón; Referee: López Cuadrado

24 September 1978 4	Real Sociedad	2–0	Real Sporting	San Sebastián
	Satrústegui 9'; López Ufarte 36'	Summary		Stadium: Atocha; Referee: De Sosa Martín

8 October 1978 5	Real Sporting	3–0	Rayo Vallecano	Gijón
	Morán 9', 36'; Nieto 89' (o.g.)	Summary		Stadium: El Molinón; Referee: Tomeo Palanques

15 October 1978 6	Sevilla	1–1	Real Sporting	Seville
	Scotta 32'	Summary	Abel 49'	Stadium: Ramón Sánchez Pizjuán; Referee: Forés Bachero

22 October 1978 7	Real Sporting	1–0	Racing Santander	Gijón
	Rezza 73'	Summary		Stadium: El Molinón; Referee: Fandos Hernández

28 October 1978 8	Valencia	4–0	Real Sporting	Valencia
	Solsona 35', 88'; Saura 55'; Botubot 63'	Summary		Stadium: Mestalla; Referee: De Burgos Núñez

5 November 1978 9	Real Sporting	1–0	Salamanca	Gijón
	Quini 89'	Summary		Stadium: El Molinón; Referee: Sáiz Elizondo

19 November 1978 10	Real Madrid	3–2	Real Sporting	Madrid
	Jensen 11'; Santillana 48'; Guerini 61'	Summary	Ciriaco 52'; Abel 86'	Stadium: Santiago Bernabéu; Referee: Álvarez Margüenda

26 November 1978 11	Real Sporting	3–1	Barcelona	Gijón
	Quini 6', 67', 70'	Summary	Asensi 25'	Stadium: El Molinón; Referee: Sánchez Arminio

2 December 1978 12	Las Palmas	0–0	Real Sporting	Las Palmas
		Summary		Stadium: Estadio Insular; Referee: Olavarría González

17 December 1978 13	Real Sporting	4–3	Athletic Bilbao	Gijón
	Joaquín 20'; Quini 25', 85', 89'	Summary	Aitor Aguirre 6', 55'; Sarabia 88'	Stadium: El Molinón; Referee: Pes Pérez

31 December 1978 14	Burgos	0–2	Real Sporting	Burgos
		Summary		Stadium: El Plantío; Referee: López Cuadrado

7 January 1979 15	Real Sporting	2–0	Recreativo	Gijón
	Quini 6', 35'	Summary		Stadium: El Molinón; Referee: Lamo Castillo

14 January 1979 16	Celta	1–1	Real Sporting	Vigo
	Vavá 10'	Summary	Quini 89'	Stadium: Balaídos; Referee: Pes Pérez

21 January 1979 17	Real Sporting	2–0	Hércules	Gijón
	Quini 18'; Ferrero 29'	Summary		Stadium: El Molinón; Referee: Urizar Azpitarte

28 January 1979 18	Atlético Madrid	0–0	Real Sporting	Madrid
		Summary		Stadium: Vicente Calderón; Referee: Gallardo Fernández

4 February 1979 19	Real Sporting	0–0	Español	Gijón
		Summary		Stadium: El Molinón; Referee: Guruceta Muro

11 February 1979 20	Zaragoza	1–3	Real Sporting	Zaragoza
	Pichi Alonso 63'	Summary	Morán 43', 59'; Quini 45'	Stadium: La Romareda; Referee: Lamo Castillo

18 February 1979 21	Real Sporting	3–2	Real Sociedad	Gijón
	Morán 20'; Doria 70'; Quini 89'	Summary	Satrústegui 9', 59'	Stadium: El Molinón; Referee: Pes Pérez

25 February 1979 22	Rayo Vallecano	2–1	Real Sporting	Madrid
	Clares 35'; Francisco 64'	Summary	Mesa 56'	Stadium: Vallecas; Referee: Orellana Álvarez

11 March 1979 23	Real Sporting	2–0	Sevilla	Gijón
	Morán 45', 67'	Summary		Stadium: El Molinón; Referee: Sánchez Arminio

18 March 1979 24	Rayo Vallecano	0–2	Real Sporting	Santander
		Summary	Quini 12'; Ferrero 67'	Stadium: El Sardinero; Referee: Soriano Aladren

25 March 1979 25	Real Sporting	2–0	Valencia	Gijón
	Joaquín 10'; Quini 70'	Summary		Stadium: El Molinón; Referee: Jiménez Sánchez

8 April 1979 26	Salamanca	0–0	Real Sporting	Villares de la Reina
		Summary		Stadium: El Helmántico; Referee: García Carrión

15 April 1979 27	Real Sporting	0–1	Real Madrid	Gijón
		Summary	Santillana 65'	Stadium: El Molinón; Referee: Pes Pérez

21 April 1979 28	Barcelona	6–0	Real Sporting	Barcelona
	Krankl 4', 51', 70'; Asensi 21'; Neeskens 83'	Summary		Stadium: Camp Nou; Referee: Fandos Hernández

29 April 1979 29	Real Sporting	3–1	Las Palmas	Gijón
	Ferrero 54', 70'; Morán 81'	Summary	Juani 16'	Stadium: El Molinón; Referee: Sánchez Arminio

6 May 1979 30	Athletic Bilbao	1–1	Real Sporting	Bilbao
	Dani 60'	Summary	Abel 52'	Stadium: San Mamés; Referee: De Sosa Martín

13 May 1979 31	Real Sporting	3–0	Burgos	Gijón
	Morán 19'; Mesa 43'; Quini 70'	Summary		Stadium: El Molinón; Referee: Jaramillo González

19 May 1979 32	Recreativo	1–1	Real Sporting	Huelva
	Benito 8'	Summary	Quini 70'	Stadium: Colombino; Referee: Pes Pérez

22 May 1979 33	Real Sporting	2–2	Celta	Gijón
	Quini 37'; Ferrero 87'	Summary	Paco Vidal 6'; Carlos Lago 20'	Stadium: El Molinón; Referee: García Carrión

2 June 1979 34	Hércules	1–0	Real Sporting	Alicante
	Charles 18'	Summary		Stadium: Rico Pérez; Referee: Guruceta Muro

=== UEFA Cup ===
13 September Round of 64; First leg	Sporting de Gijón (Spain)	3–0	(Italy) Torino	El Molinón, Gijón
20:30	E. Ferrero 4'; Morán 14', 68'	Summary	Mozzini (yellow card) 78'	Referee: Franz Wöhrer (AUT)

27 September Round of 64; Second leg	Torino (Italy)	1–0 (1–3 agg.)	(Spain) Sporting de Gijón	Delle Alpi, Turin
20:30	Graziani 64'	Summary		Referee: Béla Nagy (HUN)

18 October Round of 32; First leg	Sporting de Gijón (Spain)	0–1	(Socialist Federal Republic of Yugoslavia) Red Star Belgrade	El Molinón, Gijón
20:30		Summary	Jovanović (red card) 30'; Muslin (yellow card) 44'; Baralić (yellow card) 62'; Blagojević 85'; Krmpotić (yellow card) 89'	Referee: John Carpenter (IRL)

1 November Round of 32; Second leg	Red Star Belgrade (Socialist Federal Republic of Yugoslavia)	1–1 (2–1 agg.)	(Spain) Sporting de Gijón	Red Star Stadium, Belgrade
17:30	Baralić (yellow card) 58'; Krmpotić (yellow card) 65'; Petrović 82'	Summary	Borovnica 21' (o.g.); Doria (yellow card) 88'	Referee: Georges Konrath (FRA)

=== Copa del Rey ===
10 January 1979 Third round First leg	Cádiz	1–0	Real Sporting	Ramón de Carranza, Cádiz
	Blanco 3'	Report		Referee: Franco Martínez

24 January 1979 Third round Second leg	Real Sporting	2–2 (2–3 agg.)	Cádiz	El Molinón, Gijón
	Cundi 45+1' (81)	Report	Módigo 72' (90+2)	Referee: Jiménez Sánchez

== Statistics ==
=== Appearances and goals ===
No.	Pos	Nat	Player	Total		La Liga		UEFA Cup		Copa del Rey	
No.	Pos	Nat	Player	Apps	Goals	Apps	Goals	Apps	Goals	Apps	Goals
	GK	(Spain) ESP	Jesús Castro	32	0	27+0	0	4+0	0	1+0	0
	GK	(Spain) ESP	Claudio	0	0	0+0	0	0+0	0	0+0	0
	GK	(Spain) ESP	Rivero	9	0	7+1	0	0+0	0	1+0	0
	DF	(Spain) ESP	Cundi	36	2	30+0	0	4+0	0	2+0	2
	DF	(Argentina) ARG	Víctor Hugo Doria	26	0	23+1	0	0+1	0	1+0	0
	DF	(Spain) ESP	Manuel Vicente González	4	0	2+0	0	0+0	0	2+0	0
	DF	(Spain) ESP	Javi	0	0	0+0	0	0+0	0	0+0	0
	DF	(Spain) ESP	Antonio Maceda	14	0	9+2	0	3+0	0	0+0	0
	DF	(Spain) ESP	José Antonio Redondo	36	0	31+0	0	3+0	0	2+0	0
	DF	(Argentina) ARG	Ricardo Rezza	37	2	33+0	2	4+0	0	0+0	0
	DF	(Spain) ESP	Francisco Javier Uría	27	0	14+8	0	3+0	0	1+1	0
	MF	(Spain) ESP	Abel	26	3	5+18	3	0+1	0	2+0	0
	MF	(Spain) ESP	Andrés Fernández	0	0	0+0	0	0+0	0	0+0	0
	MF	(Spain) ESP	Ciriaco	35	1	27+4	1	3+1	0	0+0	0
	MF	(Spain) ESP	David	21	0	12+3	0	4+0	0	2+0	0
	MF	(Spain) ESP	Joaquín	38	2	32+1	2	4+0	0	0+1	0
	MF	(Spain) ESP	Manolo Mesa	36	2	27+5	2	1+1	0	1+1	0
	MF	(Spain) ESP	José Luis Urbano	4	0	1+1	0	0+0	0	2+0	0
	MF	(Spain) ESP	Tati Valdés	1	0	0+1	0	0+0	0	0+0	0
	FW	(Argentina) ARG	Enzo Ferrero	36	7	30+0	6	4+0	1	2+0	0
	FW	(Argentina) ARG	Óscar Ferrero	4	0	1+3	0	0+0	0	0+0	0
	FW	(Spain) ESP	Enrique Morán	37	11	30+2	9	3+1	2	1+0	0
	FW	(Spain) ESP	Quini	38	23	33+0	23	4+0	0	1+0	0
	FW	(Spain) ESP	Toni	0	0	0+0	0	0+0	0	0+0	0

== See also ==
- 1978–79 La Liga
- 1978–79 Copa del Rey
- 1978–79 UEFA Cup
