= Sporting de Gijón in European football =

Spanish club in European football

- Club: Real Sporting
- Seasons played: 6
- First entry: 1978–79 UEFA Cup
- Latest entry: 1991–92 UEFA Cup

Real Sporting, a Spanish football club, has played in European football since 1979, in the UEFA Cup. The club participated in six editions, only advancing one stage in two of them.

== Overall record ==
Competition	Pld	W	D	L	GF	GA	GD
UEFA Cup	16	4	4	8	13	18	–5

== Individual records ==
=== Most appearances ===
#	Player	Matches
1	Joaquín	13
2	Cundi	9
3	Jesús Castro	8
3	Ciriaco	8
3	Enzo Ferrero	8
3	Manuel Mesa	8
3	Quini	8
3	Manolo Jiménez	8
9	Francisco Javier Uría	7
10	David	6
10	Antonio Maceda	6

=== Top scorers ===
#	Player	Goals
1	Enzo Ferrero	3
2	Enrique Morán	2
2	Milan Luhový	2
4	Manolo Jiménez	1
4	Monchu	1
4	Jaime	1
4	Mino	1

== Matches played ==
=== 1978–79 UEFA Cup ===
==== Round of 64 ====
13 September 1978 First leg	Real Sporting	3–0	(Italy) Torino	Gijón
20:30	E. Ferrero 4'; Morán 14', 68'	Summary	Mozzini (yellow card) 78'	Stadium: El Molinón; Referee: Franz Wöhrer (AUT)

27 September 1978 Second leg	Torino (Italy)	1–0 (1–3 agg.)	Real Sporting	Turin
20:30	Graziani 64'	Summary		Stadium: Delle Alpi; Referee: Béla Nagy (HUN)

==== Round of 32 ====
18 October 1978 First leg	Real Sporting	0–1	(Socialist Federal Republic of Yugoslavia) Red Star Belgrade	Gijón
20:30		Summary	Jovanović (red card) 30'; Muslin (yellow card) 44'; Baralić (yellow card) 62'; Blagojević 85'; Krmpotić (yellow card) 89'	Stadium: El Molinón; Referee: John Carpenter (IRL)

1 November 1978 Second leg	Red Star Belgrade (Socialist Federal Republic of Yugoslavia)	1–1 (2–1 agg.)	Real Sporting	Belgrade
17:30	Baralić (yellow card) 58'; Krmpotić (yellow card) 65'; Petrović 82'	Summary	Borovnica 21' (o.g.); Doria (yellow card) 88'	Stadium: Red Star Stadium; Referee: Georges Konrath (FRA)

=== 1979–80 UEFA Cup ===
==== Round of 64 ====
19 September 1979 First leg	Real Sporting	0–0	(Netherlands) PSV Eindhoven	Gijón
20:30		Summary		Stadium: El Molinón; Referee: Volker Roth (GER)

3 October 1979 Second leg	PSV Eindhoven (Netherlands)	1–0 (1–0 agg.)	Real Sporting	Eindhoven
19:00	W. van de Kerkhof 21'	Summary		Stadium: PSV Stadion; Referee: John Hunting (ENG)

=== 1980–81 UEFA Cup ===
==== Round of 64 ====
17 September 1980	Bohemians (Czechoslovakia)	3–1	Real Sporting	Prague
17:00	Bičovský 13', 85'; Levý 78'	Summary	E. Ferrero 72'	Stadium: Ďolíček; Referee: Ottorino Di Bernardo (FRA)

1 October 1980	Real Sporting	2–1 (3–4 agg.)	(Czechoslovakia) Bohemians	Gijón
20:15	E. Ferrero 18'; Jiménez 57'	Summary	Němec 10'	Stadium: El Molinón; Referee: Ronald Bridges (WAL)

=== 1985–86 UEFA Cup ===
==== Round of 64 ====
18 September 1985 First leg	Köln (West Germany)	0–0	Real Sporting	Cologne
20:00		Summary		Stadium: Müngersdorfer Stadion; Referee: Lajos Németh (HUN)

2 October 1985 Second leg	Real Sporting	1–2 (1–2 agg.)	(West Germany) Köln	Gijón
20:30	Mino 2'	Summary	Engels 46'; Dickel 77'	Stadium: El Molinón; Referee: Franz Wöhrer (AUT)

=== 1987–88 UEFA Cup ===
==== Round of 64 ====
16 September 1987 First leg	Real Sporting	1–0	(Italy) Milan	Gijón
20:30	Jaime 69'	Report		Stadium: El Molinón; Referee: Ronald Bridges (WAL)

30 September 1987 Second leg	Milan (Italy)	3–0 (3–1 agg.)	Real Sporting	Lecce (Note: Milan played their home match at Lecce due to the ban on San Siro, Milan.)
15:00	Virdis 21' (pen.), 45+' (pen.); Gullit 43'	Report		Stadium: Stadio Via del Mare; Referee: Zoran Petrović (YUG)

=== 1991–92 UEFA Cup ===
==== Round of 64 ====
18 September 1991 First leg	Real Sporting	2–0	(Socialist Federal Republic of Yugoslavia) Partizan	Gijón
20:45	Monchu 64'; Luhový 79'	Report		Stadium: El Molinón; Referee: John Blankenstein (NED)

2 October 1991 Second leg	Partizan (Socialist Federal Republic of Yugoslavia)	2–0 (a.e.t.) (2–2 agg.) (2–3 p)	Real Sporting	Istanbul (Note: Partizan played their home match at Istanbul, Turkey due to the ban to play games in the SFR Yugoslavia.)
18:00	Mijatović 85'; Zahovič 88'	Report		Stadium: BJK İnönü Stadium; Attendance: 1,189; Referee: Tullio Lanese (ITA)
	Penalties
	Mijatović (penalty missed); Krčmarević (penalty scored); Zahovič (penalty scored); Gudelj (penalty missed); Novak (penalty missed)		Avelino (penalty scored); Joaquín (penalty scored); Arturo (penalty scored); Luhový (penalty missed)

==== Round of 32 ====
24 October 1991 First leg	Real Sporting	2–2	(Romania) Steaua București	Gijón
20:30	Luhový 45'; Abelardo 90'	Report	Popa 27'; Dumitrescu 59'	Stadium: El Molinón; Referee: Günther Habermann (GER)

6 November 1991 Second leg	Steaua București (Romania)	1–0 (3–2 agg.)	Real Sporting	Bucharest
19:00	Popa 60'	Report		Stadium: Stadionul Steaua; Referee: Joël Quiniou (FRA)
