= 1981 Copa del Rey final =

Copa del Rey 1981 final
- Event: 1980–81 Copa del Rey
Barcelona	Sporting Gijón
3	1
- Date: 18 June 1981
- Venue: Vicente Calderón Stadium, Madrid
- Referee: Emilio Soriano Aladrén
- Attendance: 50,000

The 1981 Copa del Rey final was the 79th final of the King's Cup. The final was played at Vicente Calderón Stadium in Madrid, on 18 June 1981, being won by Barcelona, who beat Sporting Gijón 3–1.

== Details ==
18 June 1981
21:00 CET

Barcelona	3–1	Sporting Gijón
Quini 45', 59'; Esteban 66'	Report	Maceda 50'

Vicente Calderón Stadium, Madrid
Attendance: 50,000
Referee: Emilio Soriano Aladrén

Barcelona	Sporting Gijón

GK	1	(Spain) Pedro María Artola
DF	2	(Spain) Pepito Ramos
DF	6	(Spain) José Ramón Alexanko
DF	3	(Spain) Antonio Olmo (c)
DF	4	(Argentina) Rafael Zuviría
MF	10	(Spain) Juan José Estella
MF	5	(Spain) Paco Martínez	(substituted off) 65'
MF	8	(West Germany) Bernd Schuster
MF	11	(Spain) Esteban
FW	7	(Denmark) Allan Simonsen
FW	9	(Spain) Quini
Substitutes:
DF	12	(Spain) Manolo
GK	13	(Spain) Amador
MF	14	(Spain) Tente Sánchez	(substituted on) 65'
MF	15	(Spain) Carles Rexach
Manager:
(Argentina) Helenio Herrera

GK	1	(Spain) José Aurelio Rivero
DF	2	(Spain) José Antonio Redondo
DF	5	(Spain) Manuel Jiménez
DF	4	(Spain) Antonio Maceda
DF	3	(Spain) Cundi	(substituted off) 46'
MF	6	(Spain) Francisco Uría
MF	10	(Spain) Ciriaco Cano (c)
MF	9	(Spain) Manuel Mesa
MF	8	(Spain) Joaquín
FW	7	(Spain) Abel
FW	11	(Argentina) Enzo Ferrero
Substitutes:
DF	12	(Argentina) Víctor Doria
GK	13	(Spain) Claudio
MF	14	(Spain) David
MF	15	(Spain) Pedro	(substituted on) 46'
Manager:
(Spain) Vicente Miera

MATCH RULES

- 90 minutes.
- 30 minutes of extra-time if necessary.
- Penalty shoot-out if scores still level.
- Four named substitutes.
- Maximum of two substitutions.
