= 1983–84 Sporting de Gijón season =

Sporting de Gijón
1983–84 season
- Chairman: Manuel Vega-Arango
- Manager: Vujadin Boškov
- Stadium: El Molinón
- La Liga: 13th
- Copa del Rey: Quarterfinals
- Copa de la Liga: Quarterfinals

The 1983–84 Sporting de Gijón season was the 23rd season of the club in La Liga, the 9th consecutive after its last promotion.

== Squad ==
Note: Flags indicate national team as defined under FIFA eligibility rules; some limited exceptions apply. Players may hold more than one non-FIFA nationality.

No.	Pos.	Nation	Player
—	GK	ESP	José Aurelio Rivero
—	GK	ESP	Ablanedo II
—	GK	ESP	Jesús Castro
—	GK	ESP	Pedro Rodríguez
—	DF	ESP	Ablanedo I
—	DF	ESP	Esteban
—	DF	ESP	Manolo Jiménez
—	DF	ESP	Antonio Maceda
—	DF	ESP	José Manuel Espinosa
—	DF	ESP	José Antonio Redondo
—	DF	ESP	Cundi
—	DF	ESP	Nicolás Pereda
—	DF	ESP	Vallina

No.	Pos.	Nation	Player
—	MF	ESP	Abel
—	MF	ESP	Tino
—	MF	ESP	Manuel Mesa
—	MF	ESP	Joaquín
—	MF	ESP	David
—	FW	ARG	Enzo Ferrero
—	FW	ESP	Nacho
—	FW	ESP	Eloy
—	FW	ENG	Laurie Cunningham
—	FW	ESP	Joaquín Villa
—	FW	ESP	Zurdi
—	FW	ESP	Manuel Campuzano

== Competitions ==
=== La Liga ===
==== Results by round ====
Round	1	2	3	4	5	6	7	8	9	10	11	12	13	14	15	16	17	18	19	20	21	22	23	24	25	26	27	28	29	30	31	32	33	34
Ground	H	A	H	A	H	A	H	A	H	A	H	A	A	H	A	H	A	A	H	A	H	A	H	A	H	A	H	A	H	H	H	A	H	A
Result	D	L	W	L	D	L	W	D	W	W	D	L	L	W	L	W	L	W	L	W	D	W	D	D	W	L	L	L	D	L	L	L	L	W
Position	10	15	9	13	14	14	13	13	12	11	10	12	13	11	13	12	12	10	11	11	11	10	9	9	8	8	9	12	11	12	13	13	13	13

Source: BDFutbol
A = Away; H = Home; W = Win; D = Draw; L = Loss

==== League table ====
Pos	Team	Pld	W	D	L	GF	GA	GD	Pts	Qualification or relegation
11	Murcia	34	10	12	12	42	38	+4	32	
12	Valencia	34	12	8	14	45	47	−2	32	
13	Sporting Gijón	34	11	8	15	38	47	−9	30	
14	Valladolid	34	11	7	16	44	60	−16	29	Qualification for the UEFA Cup first round (Note: Valladolid qualified for the UEFA Cup as winners of the Copa de la Liga.)
15	Osasuna	34	11	6	17	30	44	−14	28	

Source: BDFútbol
Rules for classification: 1) Points; 2) Head-to-head results; 3) Goal difference; 4) Number of goals scored

==== Matches ====
3 September 1983 1	Real Sporting	1–1	Valencia	Gijón
	Joaquín 34'	Report	Saura 31'	Stadium: El Molinón; Referee: Álvarez Margüenda

10 September 1983 2	Real Sociedad	3–0	Real Sporting	San Sebastián
	López Ufarte 8'; Bakero 41', 88'	Report		Stadium: Atocha; Referee: Franco Martínez

18 September 1983 3	Real Sporting	2–1	Cádiz	Gijón
	Joaquín 30'; Mesa 82'	Report	Mágico González 70'	Stadium: El Molinón; Referee: Marín López

25 September 1983 4	Zaragoza	4–1	Real Sporting	Zaragoza
	Señor 45', 75'; Ayneto 84'; Herrera 88'	Report	Abel 48'	Stadium: La Romareda; Referee: Ceballos Borrego

2 October 1983 5	Real Sporting	1–1	Salamanca	Gijón
	Tino 75'	Report	Orejuela 69'	Stadium: El Molinón; Referee: Casajuana Rifà

9 October 1983 5	Barcelona	4–0	Real Sporting	Barcelona
	Jiménez 4' (o.g.); Quini 25'; Lobo Carrasco 57'; Marcos Alonso 62'	Report		Stadium: Nou Camp; Referee: Sánchez Arminio

19 October 1983 7	Real Sporting	2–0	Atlético Madrid	Gijón
	Cunningham 18', 48'	Report		Stadium: El Molinón; Referee: Marín López

23 October 1983 8	Sevilla	1–1	Real Sporting	Seville
	Ruda 83'	Report	Abel 69'; Redondo (yellow card) (yellow-red card) 88'	Stadium: Ramón Sánchez Pizjuán; Referee: Jiménez Moreno

30 October 1983 9	Real Sporting	2–1	Osasuna	Gijón
	Abel 51'; Eloy 71'	Report	Enrique Martín 1'	Stadium: El Molinón; Referee: Jiménez Madrid

6 November 1983 10	Mallorca	1–2	Real Sporting	Palma
	Armstrong 66'	Report	Maceda 21'; Eloy 58'	Stadium: Lluís Sitjar; Referee: Álvarez Margüenda

9 November 1983 11	Real Sporting	2–2	Athletic Bilbao	Gijón
	Cunningham 5'; Joaquín 60'	Report	Sarabia 35'; Maceda 66' (o.g.)	Stadium: El Molinón; Referee: Damín Rendón

20 November 1983 12	Murcia	2–1	Real Sporting	Murcia
	Moyano 30'; Figueroa 53'; Guina (red card) 89'	Report	Eloy 16'	Stadium: La Condomina; Referee: García de Loza

27 November 1983 13	Español	2–0	Real Sporting	Barcelona
	Márquez 24'; Job 77'	Report		Stadium: Sarrià; Referee: Benavente Garasa

4 December 1983 14	Real Sporting	5–1	Valladolid	Gijón
	Sánchez Vallés 3' (o.g.); Cundi 31'; Eloy 61' (pen.); Nacho 66', 75'	Report	Da Silva 55'	Stadium: El Molinón; Referee: Andújar Oliver

11 December 1983 15	Real Madrid	2–1	Real Sporting	Madrid
	Pineda 68', 82'	Report	Maceda 87'	Stadium: Santiago Bernabéu; Referee: Valdés Sánchez

9 December 1983 16	Real Sporting	2–0	Real Betis	Gijón
	Nacho 36', 66'	Report		Stadium: El Molinón; Referee: Miguel Pérez

1 January 1984 17	Málaga	1–1	Real Sporting	Málaga
	Regenhardt 10'	Report	Mesa 42'	Stadium: La Rosaleda; Referee: Sánchez Molina Soto

8 January 1984 18	Valencia	0–3	Real Sporting	Valencia
		Report	Ferrero 50'; Nacho 68'; Jiménez 87'	Stadium: Luis Casanova; Referee: Socorro González

15 January 1984 19	Real Sporting	1–2	Real Sociedad	Gijón
	Ferrero 42'	Report	Mesa 35' (o.g.); Uralde 80'	Stadium: El Molinón; Referee: Martín Navarrete

22 January 1984 20	Cádiz	0–2	Real Sporting	Cádiz
		Report	Mesa 31'; Ferrero 40'	Stadium: Ramón de Carranza; Referee: Ramos Marcos

29 January 1984 21	Real Sporting	1–1	Zaragoza	Gijón
	Maceda 51'	Report	Amarilla 75'	Stadium: El Molinón; Referee: Jiménez Moreno

5 February 1984 22	Salamanca	0–1	Real Sporting	Villares de la Reina
		Report	Maceda 75'	Stadium: Helmántico; Referee: Andújar Oliver

12 February 1984 23	Real Sporting	0–0	Barcelona	Gijón
		Report		Stadium: El Molinón; Referee: Franco Martínez

19 February 1984 24	Atlético Madrid	1–1	Real Sporting	Madrid
	Rubio 42'	Report	Mesa 53'	Stadium: Vicente Calderón; Referee: Valdés Sánchez

27 January 1984 25	Real Sporting	1–0	Sevilla	Gijón
	Joaquín 4'; Espinosa (red card) 80'; Tino (yellow card) (yellow-red card) 85'	Report	Álvarez II (red card)	Stadium: El Molinón; Referee: Enríquez Negreira

4 March 1984 26	Osasuna	1–0	Real Sporting	Pamplona
	Iriguibel 10'	Report		Stadium: El Sadar; Referee: Bayarri Ribelles

20 February 1983 27	Real Sporting	0–3	Mallorca	Gijón
		Report	Riado 2'; Estella 30'; Verón 85'	Stadium: El Molinón; Referee: Miguel Pérez

18 March 1984 28	Athletic Bilbao	1–0	Real Sporting	Bilbao
	Liceranzu 29'	Report		Stadium: San Mamés; Referee: Álvarez Margüenda

25 March 1984 29	Real Sporting	1–1	Murcia	Gijón
	Eloy 44'	Report	Pelegrín 70'	Stadium: El Molinón; Referee: Borrás del Barrio

24 March 1984 30	Real Sporting	0–1	Español	Gijón
		Report	Forcadell 49'	Stadium: El Molinón; Referee: Jiménez Madrid

30 March 1984 31	Valladolid	2–0	Real Sporting	Valladolid
	Moré 37'; Richard 81'	Report		Stadium: José Zorrilla; Referee: Enríquez Negreira

14 April 1984 32	Real Sporting	1–2	Real Madrid	Gijón
	Maceda 70' (yellow card) (yellow-red card) 72'	Report	Camacho 10'; Stielike 89'	Stadium: El Molinón; Referee: Andújar Oliver

22 April 1984 33	Real Betis	3–0	Real Sporting	Seville
	Calderón 35', 58', 72' (pen.)	Report		Stadium: Benito Villamarín; Referee: Lamo Castillo

29 April 1984 34	Real Sporting	2–0	Málaga	Gijón
	Redondo 12'; Ferrero 45'	Report		Stadium: El Molinón; Referee: Bayarri Ribelles

=== Copa del Rey ===
==== Matches ====
15 September 1983 First round First leg	Langreo	0–1	Real Sporting	Langreo
		Report	Mesa 49'	Stadium: Ganzábal; Referee: Urízar Azpitarte

28 September 1983 First round Second leg	Real Sporting	5–0 (6–0 agg.)	Langreo	Gijón
	Maceda 54'; Eloy 73'; Mesa 76'; Abel 79', 81'	Report		Stadium: El Molinón

12 October 1983 Second round First leg	Oviedo Aficionados	0–1	Real Sporting	Oviedo
		Report	Eloy 88'	Stadium: Carlos Tartiere; Referee: Valdés Sánchez

19 October 1983 Second round Second leg	Real Sporting	4–1 (5–1 agg.)	Oviedo Aficionados	Gijón
	Campuzano 18'; Maceda 27'; Abel 59'; Cundi 83'	Report	Velázquez 80'	Stadium: El Molinón; Attendance: 12,200; Referee: Urio Velázquez

2 November 1983 Third round First leg	Güímar	0–2	Real Sporting	Santa Cruz de Tenerife (Note: Güímar played its home game at Santa Cruz de Tenerife, instead of their main stadium Tasagaya, in Güímar.)
		Report	Eloy 81'; Juanito 85' (o.g.)	Stadium: Heliodoro Rodríguez López; Referee: Lamo Castillo

23 November 1983 Third round Second leg	Real Sporting	4–0 (6–0 agg.)	Güímar	Gijón
	Villa 14'; Cunningham 36', 83'; Nacho 85'	Report		Stadium: El Molinón; Attendance: 9,500; Referee: Pas Pérez

25 January 1984 Round of 16; First leg	Xerez	0–3	Real Sporting	Jerez de la Frontera
20:30		http://hemeroteca-paginas.mundodeportivo.com./EMD01/HEM/1984/01/26/MD19840126-010.pdf Report]	Cunningham 5', 35'; Eloy 73'	Stadium: Domecq; Attendance: 9,000; Referee: Benavente Garasa

8 February 1984 Round of 16; Second leg	Real Sporting	4–0 (6–0 agg.)	Xerez	Gijón
20:15	Campuzano 7'; Ferrero 67'; Maceda 73'; Abel 83'	Report		Stadium: El Molinón; Attendance: 8,000; Referee: Borrás del Barrio

22 February 1984 Quarterfinals; First leg	Real Sporting	2–1	Athletic Bilbao	Gijón
20:30	Ferrero 6' [[Abel Díez Tejerina<|Abel]] 42'	Report	Endika 29'	Stadium: El Molinón; Attendance: 20,000; Referee: Marín López

14 March 1984 Quarterfinals; Second leg	Athletic Bilbao	2–0 (3–2 agg.)	Real Sporting	Bilbao
20:15	De Andrés 2'; Noriega 46'	Report (in Spanish)		Stadium: San Mamés; Referee: Sánchez Molina Soto

=== Copa de la Liga ===
==== Matches ====
9 May 1984 First round First leg	Real Madrid Aficionados	0–0	Real Sporting	Madrid
		Report		Referee: Socorro González

16 May 1984 First round First leg	Real Sporting	3–0 (3–0 agg.)	Real Madrid Aficionados	Gijón
	Mesa 56', 81'; Ferrero 61'	Report		Stadium: El Molinón; Referee: Miguel Pérez

20 May 1984 Second round First leg	Real Sporting	3–0	Osasuna	Gijón
	Lecumberri 70' (o.g.); Zurdi 80'; Abel 81'	Report		Stadium: El Molinón; Referee: Benavente Garasa

27 May 1984 Second round Second leg	Osasuna	2–1 (2–4 agg.)	Real Sporting	Pamplona
	Espinosa 9' (o.g.); Bayona 33'	Report	Ferrero 27'	Stadium: El Sadar; Referee: Ramos Marcos

2 June 1984 Quarterfinals; First leg	Real Sporting	0–1	Real Betis	Gijón
		Report	Calleja 17'; Ortega (yellow card) (yellow-red card) 84'	Stadium: El Molinón; Referee: Sánchez Molina Soto

9 June 1984 Quarterfinals; Second leg	Zaragoza	1–1 (2–1 agg.)	Real Sporting	Seville
	Paco 42'	Report	Eloy 61'	Stadium: Benito Villamarín; Referee: Valdés Sánchez

== Squad statistics ==
=== Appearances and goals ===
No.	Pos	Nat	Player	Total		La Liga		Copa de la Liga	
No.	Pos	Nat	Player	Apps	Goals	Apps	Goals	Apps	Goals
	GK	(Spain) ESP	José Aurelio Rivero	24	0	24+0	0	0+0	0
	GK	(Spain) ESP	Ablanedo II	8	0	2+0	0	6+0	0
	GK	(Spain) ESP	Jesús Castro	4	0	4+0	0	0+0	0
	GK	(Spain) ESP	Pedro Rodríguez	5	0	4+1	0	0+0	0
	DF	(Spain) ESP	Ablanedo I	3	0	1+0	0	2+0	0
	DF	(Spain) ESP	Esteban	31	0	31+0	0	0+0	0
	DF	(Spain) ESP	Manolo Jiménez	36	1	30+0	1	6+0	0
	DF	(Spain) ESP	Antonio Maceda	30	5	30+0	5	0+0	0
	DF	(Spain) ESP	José Manuel Espinosa	31	0	25+1	0	5+0	0
	DF	(Spain) ESP	José Antonio Redondo	26	1	20+0	1	6+0	0
	DF	(Spain) ESP	Cundi	22	1	20+0	1	2+0	0
	DF	(Spain) ESP	Nicolás Pereda	17	0	10+3	0	4+0	0
	DF	(Spain) ESP	Vallina	4	0	1+3	0	0+0	0
	MF	(Spain) ESP	Abel	26	4	10+10	3	2+4	1
	MF	(Spain) ESP	Tino	23	1	13+5	1	5+0	0
	MF	(Spain) ESP	Manuel Mesa	38	6	29+3	4	6+0	2
	MF	(Spain) ESP	Joaquín	37	4	31+0	4	6+0	0
	MF	(Spain) ESP	David	5	0	1+3	0	0+1	0
	FW	(Argentina) ARG	Enzo Ferrero	24	6	18+2	4	4+0	2
	FW	(Spain) ESP	Nacho	22	5	7+13	5	1+1	0
	FW	(Spain) ESP	Eloy	38	6	26+7	5	2+3	1
	FW	(England) ENG	Laurie Cunningham	34	4	29+1	4	4+0	0
	FW	(Spain) ESP	Joaquín Villa	14	0	7+5	0	1+1	0
	FW	(Spain) ESP	Zurdi	15	1	1+8	0	4+2	1
	FW	(Spain) ESP	Manuel Campuzano	1	0	0+1	0	0+0	0
