= Martos CD =

- Full name: Martos Club Deportivo
- Founded: 1970
- Ground: Estadio Municipal Ciudad de Martos; Martos, Spain
- Capacity: 5,000
- Chairman: David Siles
- Manager: J.J. Aybar
- League: División de Honor – Group 2
- 2025–26: Tercera Federación – Group 9, 16th of 18 (relegated)
Home colours	Away colours

Martos Club Deportivo is a Spanish football club, founded in 1970 and based in Martos. The club competes in División de Honor – Group 2, holding home games at the Estadio Municipal Ciudad de Martos, with a capacity of 5,000 people. It's considered a traditional team in the province of Jaén and the Tercera División, as it has played 32 seasons in this category and have played more than 1.200 matches.

== Season to season ==
Season	Tier	Division	Place	Copa del Rey
1970–71	5	2ª Reg.	4th	
1971–72	5	2ª Reg.	3rd	
1972–73	5	2ª Reg.		
1973–74	5	2ª Reg.		
1974–75	5	2ª Reg.		
1975–76	5	1ª Reg.	5th	
1976–77	5	1ª Reg.	6th	
1977–78	5	Reg. Pref.	6th	
1978–79	5	Reg. Pref.	2nd	
1979–80	4	3ª	8th	2nd round
1980–81	4	3ª	2nd	First round
1981–82	4	3ª	2nd	Third round
1982–83	4	3ª	7th	Second round
1983–84	4	3ª	9th	
1984–85	4	3ª	1st	
1985–86	4	3ª	4th	First round
1986–87	4	3ª	6th	First round
1987–88	4	3ª	9th	First round
1988–89	4	3ª	6th	
1989–90	4	3ª	7th	

Season	Tier	Division	Place	Copa del Rey
1990–91	4	3ª	8th	First round
1991–92	4	3ª	7th	
1992–93	4	3ª	9th	
1993–94	4	3ª	3rd	
1994–95	4	3ª	12th	
1995–96	4	3ª	16th	
1996–97	4	3ª	5th	
1997–98	4	3ª	7th	
1998–99	4	3ª	17th	
1999–2000	4	3ª	18th	
2000–01	5	Reg. Pref.	4th	
2001–02	5	Reg. Pref.	1st	
2002–03	4	3ª	16th	
2003–04	4	3ª	19th	
2004–05	5	1ª And.	13th	
2005–06	6	Reg. Pref.	4th	
2006–07	6	Reg. Pref.	2nd	
2007–08	5	1ª And.	10th	
2008–09	5	1ª And.	3rd	
2009–10	5	1ª And.	2nd	

Season	Tier	Division	Place	Copa del Rey
2010–11	4	3ª	10th	
2011–12	4	3ª	10th	
2012–13	4	3ª	7th	
2013–14	4	3ª	7th	
2014–15	4	3ª	4th	
2015–16	4	3ª	10th	
2016–17	4	3ª	9th	
2017–18	4	3ª	15th	
2018–19	4	3ª	18th	
2019–20	5	Div. Hon.	13th	
2020–21	5	Div. Hon.	6th / 6th	
2021–22	7	1ª And.	2nd	
2022–23	6	Div. Hon.	8th	
2023–24	6	Div. Hon.	3rd	
2024–25	5	3ª Fed.	14th	
2025–26	5	3ª Fed.	16th	
2026–27	6	Div. Hon.		

- 32 seasons in Tercera División
- 2 seasons in Tercera Federación
