= 1981–82 Copa del Rey =

80th Copa del Rey

Tournament details
- Country: Spain
- Dates: 30 August 1981 – 13 April 1982
- Teams: 136

Final positions
- Champions: Real Madrid CF
- Runners-up: Sporting de Gijón

Tournament statistics
- Matches played: 266
- Goals scored: 773 (2.91 per match)

The 1981–82 Copa del Rey was the 80th staging of the Spanish Cup, the annual domestic cup competition in the Spanish football. The tournament was attended by 136 teams from the main categories of Spaniard football.

The tournament began on 30 August 1981 and ended on 13 April 1982 with the final, held in Nuevo José Zorrilla Stadium, in Valladolid. This field was opened two months earlier and was baptized as Stadium of Pneumonia because it was always cold there.

Real Madrid CF won their 15th title with a 2–1 victory over Sporting de Gijón, team that played their second consecutive final.

The defending champions, FC Barcelona, were defeated 1–0 (on aggregate score) by Atlético de Madrid in the round of 16.

== Format ==
Schedule
Round	Fixture	Clubs	Gain entry
First round	65	136 → 71	All Clubs participating gain entry
Second round	34	71 → 37	Atlético de Madrid, Real Sociedad (*)
Third round	17	37 → 20	
Fourth round	4	20 → 16	
Round of 16	8	16 → 8	FC Barcelona, Real Madrid CF, Valencia CF (*)
Quarter-finals	4	8 → 4	
Semi-finals	2	4 → 2	
Final	1	2 → 1	

Teams
Division	No. clubs
1ª División	18
2ª División	20
2ª División B	26
3ª División	72
Total teams	136

- All rounds are played over two legs except the final which is played a single match in a neutral venue. The team that has the higher aggregate score over the two legs progresses to the next round.
- In case of a tie on aggregate, will play an extra time of 30 minutes, and if still tied, will be decided with a penalty shoot-outs.
- The teams that play European competitions are exempt until the round of 16 or when they are removed from the tournament.
- The winners of the competition will earn a place in the group stage of next season's UEFA Cup Winners' Cup, if they have not already qualified for European competition, if so then the runners-up will instead take this berth.

(*) Teams playing European competition.

== First round ==
First round
Home 1st leg	Agg.	Home 2nd leg	1st leg			2nd leg			Notes
Sestao SC	1–2	Athletic Bilbao	1 Sep 1981	1–0	Rep.	30 Sep 1981	2–0	Rep.	
Atlético Astorga CF	4–3	SD Ponferradina	30 Aug 1981	2–1	Rep.	9 Sep 1981	2–2		
Racing de Santander	5–0	Santoña CF	2 Sep 1981	3–0	Rep.	16 Sep 1981	0–2	Rep.	
CF Gandía	0–4	CD Castellón	2 Sep 1981	0–1	Rep.	16 Sep 1981	3–0	Rep.	
CD Guardo	1–9	Real Valladolid Deportivo	2 Sep 1981	1–5	Rep.	16 Sep 1981	4–0	Rep.	
Cádiz CF	3–0	UD Melilla	2 Sep 1981	1–0	Rep.	30 Sep 1981	0–2	Rep.	
Sporting San José	2–11	UD Las Palmas	2 Sep 1981	0–4	Rep.	17 Sep 1981	7–2	Rep.	
CD Ourense	3–6	Celta de Vigo	2 Sep 1981	2–1	Rep.	16 Sep 1981	5–2	Rep.	
Arenas de Getxo	1–3	Barakaldo CF	2 Sep 1981	1–1		24 Sep 1981	2–0	Rep.	
SD Erandio	1–1 (p)	CD Aurrerá	2 Sep 1981	1–0		16 Sep 1981	1–0		Penalties: 8–7 for CD Aurrerá.
CF Reus Deportiu	4–5	Barcelona Amateur	2 Sep 1981	3–1	Rep.	30 Sep 1981	4–1	Rep.	
UD Puçol	2–3	Levante UD	2 Sep 1981	1–0	Rep.	30 Sep 1981	3–1	Rep.	
CD Leganés	2–3	Castilla CF	2 Sep 1981	1–1	Rep.	16 Sep 1981	2–1	Rep.	
AD Alcorcón	2–2 (p)	Getafe Deportivo	2 Sep 1981	2–0	Rep.	30 Sep 1981	2–0		Penalties: 1–4 for AD Alcorcón.
Real Murcia CF	3–2	Albacete Balompié	2 Sep 1981	2–0	Rep.	30 Sep 1981	2–1	Rep.	
Real Valladolid Promesas	0–7	UD Salamanca	2 Sep 1981	0–2	Rep.	24 Sep 1981	5–0	Rep.	
Palencia CF	7–0	Atlético Bembibre	2 Sep 1981	4–0		22 Oct 1981	0–3		Match postponed (2nd leg) after the appeal by the Palencia CF by federative elimination.
Xerez CD	1–2	Recreativo de Huelva	2 Sep 1981	1–1	Rep.	24 Sep 1981	1–0	Rep.	
CD Antequerano	1–2	Linares CF	2 Sep 1981	1–0	Rep.	30 Sep 1981	2–0		
CD Tenerife	4–1	UD Realejos	2 Sep 1981	3–1		30 Sep 1981	0–1		
Barcelona Atlético	8–2	UD Poblense	2 Sep 1981	6–1	Rep.	16 Sep 1981	1–2	Rep.	
Arousa SC	2–1	UD Gijón Industrial	2 Sep 1981	2–0		16 Sep 1981	1–0		
SD Eibar	4–0	CD Anaitasuna	2 Sep 1981	1–0		16 Sep 1981	0–3		
FC Vilafranca	2–4	UE Figueres	2 Sep 1981	2–1	Rep.	23 Sep 1981	3–0	Rep.	Match suspended due to poor visibility (1st leg–half time)–resumed on 9 Sep 1981.
CD Denia	4–3	UD Carcaixent	2 Sep 1981	3–1		16 Sep 1981	2–1		
Torrevieja CF	5–4	Imperial CF	2 Sep 1981	4–1		30 Sep 1981	3–1		
Atlético Sanluqueño CF	2–5	Sevilla Atlético	2 Sep 1981	2–2		16 Sep 1981	3–0	Rep.	
CP Cacereño	4–2	CD Béjar Industrial	2 Sep 1981	4–0		16 Sep 1981	2–0		
CD San Andrés	6–1	Toscal CF	2 Sep 1981	4–1		16 Sep 1981	1–2		
Caudal Deportivo	1–5	Sporting de Gijón	2 Sep 1981	0–3	Rep.	29 Sep 1981	2–1	Rep.	
CA Osasuna	5–2	Endesa Andorra	2 Sep 1981	4–1	Rep.	30 Sep 1981	1–1	Rep.	
UE Lleida	1–3	RCD Espanyol	2 Sep 1981	1–0	Rep.	24 Sep 1981	3–0	Rep.	
CF Lorca Deportiva	0–3	Hércules CF	2 Sep 1981	0–1	Rep.	22 Sep 1981	2–0	Rep.	Match scheduled for 17 Sep, but played on 22 Sep.
Coria CF	3–8	Real Betis	2 Sep 1981	0–2	Rep.	16 Sep 1981	6–3	Rep.	
Algeciras CF	3–2	Sevilla FC	2 Sep 1981	1–1	Rep.	30 Sep 1981	1–2	Rep.	
CD Lugo	1–8	Deportivo de La Coruña	2 Sep 1981	0–0	Rep.	16 Sep 1981	8–1	Rep.	
SD Compostela	5–1	Vista Alegre SD	2 Sep 1981	3–0		16 Sep 1981	1–2		
CD Lagun Onak	2–3 (aet)	Deportivo Alavés	2 Sep 1981	0–0	Rep.	16 Sep 1981	3–2	Rep.	
San Sebastián CF	0–4	Bilbao Athletic	2 Sep 1981	0–0		16 Sep 1981	4–0		
CE Júpiter	2–6	CE Sabadell FC	2 Sep 1981	1–0	Rep.	30 Sep 1981	6–1	Rep.	
CF Badalona	3–4	Gimnàstic de Tarragona	2 Sep 1981	3–3	Rep.	23 Sep 1981	1–0	Rep.	
Rayo Vallecano	8–1	AD Parla	2 Sep 1981	4–1	Rep.	24 Sep 1981	0–4	Rep.	
CD Colonia Moscardó	2–4 (aet)	Atlético Madrileño	2 Sep 1981	2–0	Rep.	29 Sep 1981	4–0	Rep.	
Elche CF	5–0	Yeclano CF	2 Sep 1981	1–0	Rep.	16 Sep 1981	0–4	Rep.	
Cartagena CF	3–0	Caravaca CF	2 Sep 1981	2–0		30 Sep 1981	0–1		
Cultural Leonesa	5–4	Burgos CF	2 Sep 1981	3–1	Rep.	30 Sep 1981	3–2	Rep.	
CD Pozoblanco	2–3	Córdoba CF	2 Sep 1981	1–0	Rep.	30 Sep 1981	3–1	Rep.	
Granada CF	5–1	Úbeda CF	2 Sep 1981	2–0		16 Sep 1981	1–3	Rep.	
Juventud Torremolinos CF	1–3	CD Málaga	2 Sep 1981	0–2	Rep.	10 Sep 1981	1–1	Rep.	
RCD Mallorca	7–0	CD Margaritense	2 Sep 1981	6–0	Rep.	17 Sep 1981	0–1	Rep.	
CD Peña Sport	2–3	CD Sangüesa	2 Sep 1981	1–1		30 Sep 1981	2–1		
CD Alcoyano	4–6	Catarroja CF	2 Sep 1981	4–2		16 Sep 1981	4–0		
Real Aranjuez CF	2–3	CD Manchego	2 Sep 1981	1–1		16 Sep 1981	2–1		
CD Estepona	2–4	CD Martos	2 Sep 1981	2–1		16 Sep 1981	3–0		
UD Lanzarote	3–1	UD Telde	2 Sep 1981	1–0		16 Sep 1981	1–2		
CD Constancia	3–4	CD Murense	2 Sep 1981	2–3		16 Sep 1981	1–1	Rep.	
Deportivo Aragón	3–6	CD Logroñés	3 Sep 1981	3–0		30 Sep 1981	6–0		
Deportiva Piloñesa	3–9	CD Naval	8 Sep 1981	1–3		16 Sep 1981	6–2		
CF Sporting Mahonés	1–1 (p)	Atlético Ciudadela	8 Sep 1981	0–1	Rep.	16 Sep 1981	0–1	Rep.	Penalties: x–x for Atlético Ciudadela.
Gran Peña Celtista	4–3	Alondras CF	9 Sep 1981	1–2		16 Sep 1981	1–3		
Sporting de Gijón Atlético	2–5	Real Oviedo CF	9 Sep 1981	1–2	Rep.	22 Sep 1981	3–1	Rep.	
CD Tudelano	2–8	Real Zaragoza	9 Sep 1981	1–2	Rep.	16 Sep 1981	6–1	Rep.	
CD Badajoz	5–3	CD Don Benito	9 Sep 1981	4–2		23 Sep 1981	1–1	Rep.	
Real Jaén CF	2–8	AD Almería	11 Sep 1981	1–3	Rep.	30 Sep 1981	3–0		
Bye by draw: AD Ceuta, Atlético de Madrid, FC Barcelona, Real Madrid CF, Real Sociedad, Valencia CF.
Bye: CD Binéfar, their opponents, CD Mirandés, retired of the competition by economic problems.
Results of matches played: 2 September / 3 September / 9 September / 17 September / 30 September / 22 October

== Second round ==
Second round
Home 1st leg	Agg.	Home 2nd leg	1st leg			2nd leg			Notes
Cultural Leonesa	0–3	Sporting de Gijón	21 Oct 1981	0–0	Rep.	4 Nov 1981	3–0	Rep.	
Racing de Santander	0–0 (p)	Gran Peña Celtista	21 Oct 1981	0–0	Rep.	4 Nov 1981	0–0	Rep.	Penalties: 5–3 for Gran Peña Celtista.
Bilbao Athletic	1–4	Real Sociedad	21 Oct 1981	1–3	Rep.	4 Nov 1981	1–0	Rep.	
CD Aurrerá	0–3	Athletic Bilbao	21 Oct 1981	0–2	Rep.	28 Oct 1981	1–0	Rep.	
SD Eibar	2–4	CA Osasuna	21 Oct 1981	1–2	Rep.	4 Nov 1981	2–1		
CD Logroñés	0–5	Real Zaragoza	21 Oct 1981	0–1	Rep.	4 Nov 1981	4–0	Rep.	
Gimnàstic de Tarragona	1–3	RCD Espanyol	21 Oct 1981	0–0	Rep.	5 Nov 1981	3–1	Rep.	
CD Denia	0–8	CD Castellón	21 Oct 1981	0–4	Rep.	4 Nov 1981	4–0	Rep.	
CD Manchego	1–5	Atlético de Madrid	21 Oct 1981	1–5	Rep.	5 Nov 1981	0–0	Rep.	
Atlético Astorga FC	1–5	Real Valladolid Deportivo	21 Oct 1981	0–2	Rep.	4 Nov 1981	3–1		
Algeciras CF	1–5	Real Betis	21 Oct 1981	1–1	Rep.	4 Nov 1981	4–0	Rep.	
Cádiz CF	2–3	AD Ceuta	21 Oct 1981	2–1	Rep.	4 Nov 1981	2–0	Rep.	
UD Lanzarote	0–5	UD Las Palmas	21 Oct 1981	0–0		4 Nov 1981	5–0		
CD Murense	1–6	Hércules CF	21 Oct 1981	1–1	Rep.	5 Nov 1981	5–0	Rep.	
Arousa SC	2–3	Deportivo de La Coruña	21 Oct 1981	1–1		4 Nov 1981	2–1		
SD Compostela	1–2	Celta de Vigo	21 Oct 1981	1–1		5 Nov 1981	1–0	Rep.	
CD Naval	1–2	Real Oviedo CF	21 Oct 1981	1–0		4 Nov 1981	2–0		
Deportivo Alavés	3–1	Barakaldo CF	21 Oct 1981	2–0		4 Nov 1981	1–1		
CE Sabadell FC	2–4	Barcelona Amateur	21 Oct 1981	2–3	Rep.	4 Nov 1981	1–0	Rep.	
AD Alcorcón	2–8	Atlético Madrileño	21 Oct 1981	1–2		28 Oct 1981	6–1		
Torrevieja CF	1–3	Real Murcia CF	21 Oct 1981	0–1		4 Nov 1981	2–1		
Cartagena CF	1–3	Elche CF	21 Oct 1981	0–0		4 Nov 1981	3–1		
Recreativo de Huelva	4–5	Sevilla Atlético	21 Oct 1981	3–2	Rep.	4 Nov 1981	3–1	Rep.	
CD Martos	5–3 (aet)	AD Almería	21 Oct 1981	1–0		4 Nov 1981	3–4	Rep.	
Linares CF	2–1	Granada CF	21 Oct 1981	2–0		4 Nov 1981	1–0		
Córdoba CF	1–4	CD Málaga	21 Oct 1981	0–0	Rep.	4 Nov 1981	4–1		
CD Binéfar	5–4	CD Sangüesa	21 Oct 1981	4–1		4 Nov 1981	3–1		
Barcelona Atlético	5–3	UE Figueres	21 Oct 1981	5–1	Rep.	4 Nov 1981	2–0	Rep.	
CD San Andrés	3–5	CD Tenerife	21 Oct 1981	2–2		4 Nov 1981	3–1		
Rayo Vallecano	3–1	CP Cacereño	22 Oct 1981	2–0		4 Nov 1981	1–1		
Levante UD	7–2	Catarroja CF	22 Oct 1981	2–1		4 Nov 1981	1–5		
Palencia CF	2–2 (p)	UD Salamanca	28 Oct 1981	1–1		4 Nov 1981	1–1		Penalties: 7–3 for UD Salamanca.
Atlético Ciudadela	1–7	RCD Mallorca	28 Oct 1981	1–4		4 Nov 1981	3–0		
Castilla CF	1–0	CD Badajoz	28 Oct 1981	0–0		4 Nov 1981	0–1		
Bye: FC Barcelona, Real Madrid CF, Valencia CF.
Results of matches played: 21 October / 22 October / 28 October / 4 November

== Third round ==
Third round
Home 1st leg	Agg.	Home 2nd leg	1st leg			2nd leg			Notes
Athletic Bilbao	3–0	Barcelona Atlético	25 Nov 1981	2–0	Rep.	9 Dec 1981	0–1	Rep.	
Atlético Madrileño	3–1	Castilla CF	25 Nov 1981	1–0	Rep.	10 Dec 1981	1–2	Rep.	
Barcelona Amateur	3–4	Atlético de Madrid	25 Nov 1981	1–1	Rep.	8 Dec 1981	3–2	Rep.	
Celta de Vigo	1–1 (p)	Deportivo Alavés	25 Nov 1981	1–0	Rep.	8 Dec 1981	1–0	Rep.	Penalties: 5–4 for Deportivo Alavés.
Deportivo de La Coruña	2–2 (p)	CD Tenerife	25 Nov 1981	2–1	Rep.	9 Dec 1981	1–0	Rep.	Penalties: 3–4 for Deportivo de La Coruña.
Elche CF	4–1	Gran Peña Celtista	25 Nov 1981	2–0	Rep.	9 Dec 1981	1–2	Rep.	
RCD Espanyol	2–6	Real Zaragoza	9 Dec 1981	1–4	Rep.	23 Dec 1981	2–1	Rep.	
UD Las Palmas	6–1	Levante UD	25 Nov 1981	6–1	Rep.	8 Dec 1981	0–0	Rep.	
Linares CF	3–6 (aet)	Real Betis	25 Nov 1981	1–1	Rep.	8 Dec 1981	5–2	Rep.	
CD Málaga	3–2	AD Ceuta	25 Nov 1981	3–2	Rep.				AD Ceuta eliminated by improper line-up.
CD Martos	2–7	Real Valladolid Deportivo	24 Nov 1981	1–1	Rep.	8 Dec 1981	6–1	Rep.	
CD Binéfar	5–5 (p)	RCD Mallorca	25 Nov 1981	3–1	Rep.	9 Dec 1981	4–2	Rep.	Penalties: 3–2 for RCD Mallorca.
Real Murcia CF	1–2 (aet)	UD Salamanca	25 Nov 1981	1–0	Rep.	8 Dec 1981	2–0	Rep.	
CA Osasuna	2–4	Real Sociedad	25 Nov 1981	1–1	Rep.	9 Dec 1981	3–1	Rep.	
Rayo Vallecano	2–0	Real Oviedo CF	24 Nov 1981	2–0	Rep.	8 Dec 1981	0–0	Rep.	
Sevilla Atlético	3–5	Hércules CF	25 Nov 1981	0–2	Rep.	8 Dec 1981	3–3	Rep.	
Sporting de Gijón	4–3	CD Castellón	25 Nov 1981	3–1	Rep.	9 Dec 1981	2–1	Rep.	
Bye: FC Barcelona, Real Madrid CF, Valencia CF.

== Fourth round ==
Fourth round
Home 1st leg	Agg.	Home 2nd leg	1st leg			2nd leg			Notes
Deportivo Alavés	2–4	Atlético de Madrid	6 Jan 1982	1–2	Rep.	13 Jan 1982	2–1	Rep.	
Real Betis	2–3	Athletic Bilbao	6 Jan 1982	2–1	Rep.	13 Jan 1982	2–0	Rep.	
Hércules CF	2–3	Elche CF	6 Jan 1982	2–1	Rep.	13 Jan 1982	2–0	Rep.	
RCD Mallorca	0–2	UD Salamanca	6 Jan 1982	0–0	Rep.	13 Jan 1982	2–0	Rep.	
Bye: Rayo Vallecano, Atlético Madrileño, CD Málaga, Deportivo de La Coruña, Real Sociedad, Sporting de Gijón, Real Valladolid Deportivo, Real Zaragoza, UD Las Palmas, FC Barcelona, Real Madrid CF, Valencia CF.

== Bracket ==
Round of 16
1	UD Las Palmas	1	1	2
16	Athletic Bilbao	1	4	5
8	Real Sociedad	3	2	5
9	Real Valladolid Deportivo	3	0	3
5	CD Málaga	1	1	2
12	Real Madrid CF	1	5	6
4	Atlético de Madrid	1	0	1
13	FC Barcelona	0	0	0
6	Real Zaragoza	3	0	3
11	UD Salamanca	0	2	2
3	Atlético Madrileño	0	0	0
14	Rayo Vallecano	0	2	2
7	Deportivo de La Coruña	2	2	4
10	Elche CF	1	2	3
2	Sporting de Gijón	6	0	6
15	Valencia CF	1	1	2

Quarter-finals
Athletic Bilbao	1	2	3
Real Sociedad (4–2 p)	0	3	3
Real Madrid CF	0	1	1
Atlético de Madrid	0	0	0
Real Zaragoza	2	2	4
Rayo Vallecano	1	5	6
Deportivo de La Coruña	1	0	1
Sporting de Gijón	1	1	2

Semi-finals
Real Sociedad	1	0	1
Real Madrid CF (4–3 p)	0	1	1
Rayo Vallecano	0	0	0
Sporting de Gijón	1	3	4

Final
Real Madrid CF	2
Sporting de Gijón	1

== Round of 16 ==
Team 1	Agg.	Team 2	1st leg	2nd leg
Las Palmas	2–5	Athletic Bilbao	1-1	1-4
Real Sociedad	5–3	Real Valladolid	3-3	2-0
CD Málaga	2–6	Real Madrid CF	1-1	1-5
Atlético de Madrid	1–0	Barcelona	1-0	0-0
Zaragoza	3–2	Salamanca	3-0	0-2
Atlético Madrileño	0–2	Rayo Vallecano	0-0	0-2
Deportivo de La Coruña	4–3	Elche	2-1	2-2
Sporting de Gijón	6–2	Valencia	6-1	0-1

=== First leg ===
20 January 1982	Real Sociedad	3–3	Real Valladolid Deportivo	San Sebastián
20:00 CET	Satrústegui 44'; Periko Alonso 78'; Diego 84'	Report (in Spanish)	Joaquín 18'; Alí 41'; Jorge 88'	Stadium: Atotxa; Referee: José Ramón Gutiérrez Fernández

20 January 1982	Sporting de Gijón	6–1	Valencia CF	Gijón
20:15 CET	Abel 12', 70'; Joaquín 35', 76'; Ferrero 47' (pen.), 59'	Report (in Spanish)	Roberto 2'	Stadium: El Molinón; Referee: Tomeu Riera Morro

20 January 1982	Real Zaragoza	3–0	UD Salamanca	Zaragoza
20:20 CET	Amorrortu 8'; Valdano 26'; Amarilla 90'	Report (in Spanish)		Stadium: La Romareda; Referee: Raúl García de Loza

20 January 1982	Deportivo de La Coruña	2–1	Elche CF	A Coruña
20:30 CET	Traba 45', 58'	Report (in Spanish)	Álvarez 64'	Stadium: Riazor; Referee: Pérez Calvo

20 January 1982	Atlético de Madrid	1–0	FC Barcelona	Madrid
20:45 CET	Rubio 15'	Report (in Spanish)		Stadium: Vicente Calderón; Referee: José Luis García Carrión

20 January 1982	CD Málaga	1–1	Real Madrid CF	Málaga
21:30 CET	Cantarutti 75'	Report (in Spanish)	Stielike 51' (pen.)	Stadium: La Rosaleda; Referee: Manuel Fandos

20 January 1982	UD Las Palmas	1–1	Athletic Bilbao	Las Palmas de Gran Canaria
21:30 CET	Benito 38'	Report (in Spanish)	Dani 73'	Stadium: Insular; Referee: Soriano Aladrén

21 January 1982	Atlético Madrileño	0–0	Rayo Vallecano	Madrid
20:30 CET		Report (in Spanish)		Stadium: Vicente Calderón; Attendance: 8,000; Referee: Miguel Ángel Marín López

=== Second leg ===
27 January 1982	Athletic Bilbao	4–1	UD Las Palmas	Bilbao
20:00 CET	De la Fuente 3'; Dani 15', 30' (pen.); Sola 20'	Report (in Spanish)	Víctor 60'	Stadium: San Mamés; Referee: Jesús Ausocúa Sanz

27 January 1982	Real Valladolid Deportivo	0–2	Real Sociedad	Valladolid
20:30 CET		Report (in Spanish)	Diego 63'; Periko Alonso 64'	Stadium: José Zorrilla; Referee: Ildefonso Urízar Azpitarte

27 January 1982	UD Salamanca	2–0	Real Zaragoza	Villares de la Reina
20:30 CET	Orejuela 23' (pen.); Brizzola 37'	Report (in Spanish)		Stadium: El Helmántico; Referee: José Pinter Pastor

27 January 1982	FC Barcelona	0–0	Atlético de Madrid	Barcelona
20:45 CET		Report (in Spanish)		Stadium: Camp Nou; Referee: Victoriano Sánchez Arminio

27 January 1982	Real Madrid CF	5–1	CD Málaga	Madrid
20:45 CET	García Hernández 7'; García Cortés 10'; Ito 39'; Gallego 42'; Juanito 62'	Report (in Spanish)	Popo 38'	Stadium: Santiago Bernabéu; Referee: Felipe Crespo Aurré

27 January 1982	Valencia CF	1–0	Sporting de Gijón	Valencia
21:00 CET	Arnesen 58' (pen.)	Report (in Spanish)		Stadium: Luís Casanova; Attendance: 24,000; Referee: Bartolomé Jiménez Madrid

27 January 1982	Elche CF	2–2	Deportivo de La Coruña	Elche
21:00 CET	Tenorio 8'; Botella 85'	Report (in Spanish)	Fali 18' (o.g.); Vicente 57'	Stadium: Martínez Valero; Referee: José María Benavente Garasa

28 January 1982	Rayo Vallecano	2–0	Atlético Madrileño	Madrid
20:45 CET	Pozo 17' (pen.); Marín 56'	Report (in Spanish)		Stadium: Nuevo Estadio de Vallecas; Attendance: 5,000; Referee: José Ángel Paz García

== Quarter-finals ==
Team 1	Agg.	Team 2	1st leg	2nd leg
Athletic Bilbao	3–3 (2-4 p)	Real Sociedad	1-0	2-3
Real Madrid	1–0	Atlético de Madrid	0-0	1-0
Zaragoza	4–6	Rayo Vallecano	2-1	2-5
Deportivo de La Coruña	1–2	Sporting de Gijón	1-1	0-1

=== First leg ===
3 February 1982	Athletic Bilbao	1–0	Real Sociedad	Bilbao
20:00 CET	Dani 31'	Report (in Spanish)		Stadium: San Mamés; Attendance: 40,000; Referee: Andújar Oliver

3 February 1982	Real Zaragoza	2–1	Rayo Vallecano	Zaragoza
20:30 CET	Valdano 43', 66'	Report (in Spanish)	Robles 17'	Stadium: La Romareda; Referee: Felipe Crespo Aurré

3 February 1982	Deportivo de La Coruña	1–1	Sporting de Gijón	A Coruña
20:30 CET	Peralta 30'	Report (in Spanish)	Gomes 18'	Stadium: Estadio Riazor; Referee: Fermín Sánchez Molina

3 February 1982	Real Madrid CF	0–0	Atlético de Madrid	Madrid
21:00 CET		Report (in Spanish)		Stadium: Santiago Bernabéu; Referee: José Luis García Carrión

=== Second leg ===
17 February 1982	Real Sociedad	3–2 (a.e.t.) (4–2 p)	Athletic Bilbao	San Sebastián
20:00 CET	Kortabarria 5' (pen.); Uralde 60'; Satrústegui 70'	Report (in Spanish)	Sarabia 57'; Dani 63' (pen.)	Stadium: Atotxa; Referee: Lamo Castillo
	Penalties
	Kortabarria (penalty scored); López Ufarte (penalty scored); Uralde (penalty scored); Larrañaga (penalty scored)		(penalty missed) Dani; (penalty scored) Argote; (penalty scored) Sola; (penalty missed) Goikoetxea

17 February 1982	Sporting de Gijón	1–0	Deportivo de La Coruña	Gijón
20:15 CET	Ferrero 18'	Report (in Spanish)		Stadium: El Molinón; Referee: José María Miguel Pérez

17 February 1982	Atlético de Madrid	0–1	Real Madrid CF	Madrid
21:00 CET		Report (in Spanish)	Gallego 73'	Stadium: Vicente Calderón; Referee: Victoriano Sánchez Arminio

18 February 1982	Rayo Vallecano	5–2	Real Zaragoza	Madrid
20:45 CET	Benito 20'; Aguilar 30', 47', 67'; Pozo 35' (pen.)	Report (in Spanish)	Amarilla 45+1'; Valdano 48'	Stadium: Nuevo Estadio de Vallecas; Referee: Ernesto de Burgos Núñez

== Semi-finals ==
Team 1	Agg.	Team 2	1st leg	2nd leg
Real Sociedad	1–1 (3-4 p)	Real Madrid	1-0	0-1
Rayo Vallecano	0–4	Sporting de Gijón	0-1	0-3

=== First leg ===
10 March 1982	Real Sociedad	1–0	Real Madrid CF	San Sebastián
20:00 CET	Satrústegui 63'	Report (in Spanish)		Stadium: Atotxa; Referee: José María Enríquez Negreira

10 March 1982	Rayo Vallecano	0–1	Sporting de Gijón	Madrid
21:00 CET		Report (in Spanish)	Doria 76'	Stadium: Nuevo Estadio de Vallecas; Referee: Victoriano Sánchez Arminio

=== Second leg ===
31 March 1982	Sporting de Gijón	3–0	Rayo Vallecano	Gijón
20:15 CET	Mesa 8'; Ferrero 81'; Abel 82'	Report (in Spanish)		Stadium: El Molinón; Referee: Victoriano Sánchez Arminio

31 March 1982	Real Madrid CF	1–0 (a.e.t.) (4–3 p)	Real Sociedad	Madrid
21:00 CET	Juanito 89'	Report (in Spanish)		Stadium: Santiago Bernabéu; Referee: José María Enríquez Negreira
	Penalties
	Camacho (penalty missed); Cunningham (penalty scored); García Hernández (penalty missed); Juanito (penalty scored); San José (penalty scored); Ito (penalty scored)		(penalty missed) Kortabarria; (penalty scored) López Ufarte; (penalty missed) Diego; (penalty scored) Larrañaga; (penalty scored) Periko Alonso; (penalty missed) Murillo

== Final ==
13 April 1982
20:30 CET

Real Madrid CF	2–1	Sporting de Gijón
Jiménez 4' (o.g.); Ángel 57'	Report (in Spanish)	Ferrero 35' (pen.)

Valladolid
Stadium: Nuevo José Zorrilla
Attendance: 30,000
Referee: Sánchez Arminio (Cantabria)

Copa del Rey
1981–82 winners
Real Madrid CF
15th title
