= Amador Lorenzo =

Spanish football player

Personal information
- Full name: Amador Lorenzo Lemos
- Date of birth: 29 September 1954 (age 72)
- Place of birth: Bueu, Pontevedra, Spain
- Height: 1.76 m (5 ft 9 in)
- Position: Goalkeeper

Youth career
- Pontevedra

Senior career*
Years	Team	Apps	(Gls)
1972–1975	Pontevedra	11	(0)
1976–1978	Real Madrid	1	(0)
1978–1980	Hercules	63	(0)
1980–1986	Barcelona	8	(0)
1986–1990	Real Murcia	110	(0)

International career
1971–1972	Spain U18	3	(0)
- * Club domestic league appearances and goals

Amador Lorenzo Lemos (29 September 1954) commonly known as Amador was a Spanish footballer who played as a goalkeeper.

== Honors ==
=== Club ===
- La Liga: 1977–78, 1984–85
- Supercopa de España: 1983
- Copa del Rey: 1980–81, 1982–83
- Copa de la Liga: 1983, 1986
