= CD Margaritense =

Spanish football club

Margaritense
- Full name: Club Deportivo Margaritense
- Founded: 1955
- Ground: Antoni Quetglas, Santa Margalida, Majorca, Spain
- Capacity: 2,500
- Chairman: (Spain) Bartolomé Pons
- 2011–12: Primera Regional – Mallorca, 19th of 19
Home colours	Away colours

Club Deportivo Margaritense is a Spanish football team based in Santa Margalida, Majorca, in the autonomous community of Balearic Islands. Founded in 1955, it holds home games at Estadio Antoni Quetglas, with a 2,500-seat capacity.

The club only keeps its youth teams active, with the senior team ceasing activities in 2012.

== Season to season ==
Season	Tier	Division	Place	Copa del Rey
1957–58	5	2ª Reg.		
1958–59	4	1ª Reg.	8th	
1959–60	4	1ª Reg.	8th	
1960–61	5	2ª Reg.		
1961–62	5	2ª Reg.		
1962–63	5	2ª Reg.		
1963–64	5	2ª Reg.		
1964–65	5	2ª Reg.		
1965–66	4	1ª Reg.	4th	
1966–67	DNP			
1967–68	DNP			
1968–69	5	2ª Reg.	8th	
1969–70	5	2ª Reg.	1st	
1970–71	4	1ª Reg.	5th	
1971–72	4	1ª Reg.	1st	
1972–73	4	Reg. Pref.	3rd	
1973–74	4	Reg. Pref.	4th	
1974–75	4	Reg. Pref.	2nd	
1975–76	4	Reg. Pref.	1st	
1976–77	4	Reg. Pref.	1st	

Season	Tier	Division	Place	Copa del Rey
1977–78	4	3ª	8th	First round
1978–79	4	3ª	16th	
1979–80	4	3ª	3rd	First round
1980–81	4	3ª	6th	Second round
1981–82	4	3ª	17th	First round
1982–83	4	3ª	7th	
1983–84	4	3ª	11th	
1984–85	4	3ª	16th	
1985–86	4	3ª	20th	
1986–87	5	Reg. Pref.	10th	
1987–88	5	Reg. Pref.	13th	
1988–89	5	Reg. Pref.	9th	
1989–90	5	Reg. Pref.	7th	
1990–91	5	Reg. Pref.	20th	
1991–92	6	1ª Reg.	6th	
1992–93	6	1ª Reg.	2nd	
1993–94	5	Reg. Pref.	15th	
1994–95	DNP			
1995–96	DNP			
1996–97	8	3ª Reg.	8th	

Season	Tier	Division	Place	Copa del Rey
1997–98	8	3ª Reg.	6th	
1998–99	8	3ª Reg.	2nd	
1999–2000	7	2ª Reg.	5th	
2000–01	6	1ª Reg.	7th	
2001–02	6	1ª Reg.	1st	
2002–03	5	Reg. Pref.	13th	
2003–04	5	Reg. Pref.	13th	
2004–05	5	Reg. Pref.	3rd	

Season	Tier	Division	Place	Copa del Rey
2005–06	4	3ª	11th	
2006–07	4	3ª	4th	
2007–08	4	3ª	18th	
2008–09	5	Reg. Pref.	6th	
2009–10	5	Reg. Pref.	12th	
2010–11	6	1ª Reg.	18th	
2011–12	6	1ª Reg.	19th	

- 12 seasons in Tercera División

== Notable former players ==
- (Spain) Ismael Urtubi

Mohamed Lachkar (2019)
