= 1980–81 Copa del Rey =

79th Copa del Rey

Tournament details
- Country: Spain
- Dates: 10 September 1980 – 18 June 1981
- Teams: 138

Final positions
- Champions: FC Barcelona
- Runners-up: Sporting de Gijón

Tournament statistics
- Matches played: 273
- Goals scored: 781 (2.86 per match)

The 1980–81 Copa del Rey was the 79th staging of the Spanish Cup, the annual domestic cup competition in the Spanish football. The tournament was attended by 138 teams from the main categories of Spanish football.

The tournament began on 10 September 1980 and ended on 18 June 1981 with the final, held in Vicente Calderón Stadium in Madrid, in which the FC Barcelona was crowned for the nineteenth time in their history, after beating Sporting de Gijón 3–1.

The defending champions, Real Madrid CF, were defeated 4–3 (on aggregate score) by Sporting de Gijón on their way to reach their first final.

== Format ==
Schedule
Round	Fixture	Clubs	Gain entry
First round	66	138 → 72	All Clubs participating gain entry
Second round	35	72 → 37	FC Barcelona, Castilla CF, Sporting de Gijón, Valencia CF (*)
Third round	18	37 → 19	Real Sociedad (*)
Fourth round	3	19 → 16	
Round of 16	8	16 → 8	Real Madrid CF (*)
Quarter-finals	4	8 → 4	
Semi-finals	2	4 → 2	
Final	1	2 → 1	

Teams
Division	No. clubs
1ª División	18
2ª División	20
2ª División B	28
3ª División	72
Total teams	138

- All rounds are played over two legs except the final which is played a single match in a neutral venue. The team that has the higher aggregate score over the two legs progresses to the next round.
- In case of a tie on aggregate, will play an extra time of 30 minutes, and if still tied, will be decided with a penalty shoot-outs.
- The teams that play European competitions are exempt until the round of 16 or when they are removed from the tournament.
- The winners of the competition will earn a place in the group stage of next season's UEFA Cup Winners' Cup, if they have not already qualified for European competition, if so then the runners-up will instead take this berth.

(*) Teams playing European competition.

== First round ==
First round
Home 1st leg	Agg.	Home 2nd leg	1st leg			2nd leg			Notes
CD Colonia Moscardó	0–3	Atlético de Madrid	10 Sep 1980	0–2	Rep.	16 Sep 1980	1–0	Rep.	
Santoña CF	1–2	Racing de Santander	10 Sep 1980	1–1	Rep.	1 Oct 1980	1–0	Rep.	
AD Torrejón	4–4 (p)	UD Las Palmas Atlético	16 Sep 1980	2–2	Rep.	1 Oct 1980	2–2		Penalties: 3–4 for AD Torrejón.
CD Rota	1–6	Real Betis	16 Sep 1980	0–4	Rep.	1 Oct 1980	2–1	Rep.	
CD Castro	1–8	Athletic Bilbao	17 Sep 1980	0–3	Rep.	8 Oct 1980	5–1	Rep.	
Real Zaragoza	2–3	Endesa Andorra	17 Sep 1980	1–1	Rep.	1 Oct 1980	2–1	Rep.	
CD Logroñés	5–4	CA Osasuna	17 Sep 1980	4–0	Rep.	1 Oct 1980	4–1	Rep.	
CF Igualada	0–4	RCD Espanyol	17 Sep 1980	0–0	Rep.	24 Sep 1980	4–0	Rep.	
Orihuela Deportiva CF	3–4	Hércules CF	17 Sep 1980	1–3	Rep.	1 Oct 1980	1–2	Rep.	
CD Alcoyano	4–9	Real Murcia CF	17 Sep 1980	2–3	Rep.	1 Oct 1980	6–2	Rep.	
Cultural Leonesa	0–5	UD Salamanca	17 Sep 1980	0–3	Rep.	1 Oct 1980	2–0	Rep.	
CD Estepona	1–4	AD Almería	17 Sep 1980	1–0	Rep.	1 Oct 1980	4–0	Rep.	
UD Las Palmas	3–4	CD Tenerife	17 Sep 1980	2–2	Rep.	8 Oct 1980	2–1	Rep.	
Real Avilés CF	0–2	Real Oviedo CF	17 Sep 1980	0–1		30 Sep 1980	1–0	Rep.	
CD Aurrerá	0–2	Barakaldo CF	17 Sep 1980	0–1		30 Sep 1980	1–0	Rep.	
SD Erandio	1–2	Deportivo Alavés	17 Sep 1980	1–1		8 Oct 1980	1–0		
CE Sabadell FC	4–3 (aet)	FC Barcelona Atlètic	17 Sep 1980	2–2	Rep.	24 Sep 1980	1–2	Rep.	
CD Acero	2–11	CD Castellón	17 Sep 1980	2–4	Rep.	1 Oct 1980	7–0	Rep.	
RSD Alcalá	2–3	Getafe Deportivo	17 Sep 1980	1–0		1 Oct 1980	3–1		
CD Valdepeñas	2–5	Atlético Madrileño	17 Sep 1980	1–2		30 Sep 1980	3–1	Rep.	
Elche CF	3–0	Crevillente CF	17 Sep 1980	2–0	Rep.	1 Oct 1980	0–1		
Zamora CF	1–3	Burgos CF	17 Sep 1980	0–1		1 Oct 1980	2–1	Rep.	
Gimnástica Arandina	1–6	Palencia CF	17 Sep 1980	1–1		1 Oct 1980	5–0	Rep.	
Recreativo de Huelva	9–1	Real Balompédica Linense	17 Sep 1980	5–0	Rep.	1 Oct 1980	1–4		
Algeciras CF	2–4	Cádiz CF	17 Sep 1980	2–2	Rep.	1 Oct 1980	2–0	Rep.	
AD Ceuta	5–1	Racing Portuense	17 Sep 1980	3–0		1 Oct 1980	1–2		
CD Málaga	6–1	UD Melilla	17 Sep 1980	3–1	Rep.	1 Oct 1980	1–3		
Úbeda CF	3–6	Granada CF	17 Sep 1980	1–2		1 Oct 1980	4–2		
Linares CF	4–1	CD Martos	17 Sep 1980	2–0		1 Oct 1980	1–2		
CD Lugo	1–2	SD Compostela	17 Sep 1980	1–1		1 Oct 1980	1–0		
UP Langreo	2–1	Caudal Deportivo	17 Sep 1980	2–0		1 Oct 1980	1–0		
Balmaseda FC	1–2	Sestao SC	17 Sep 1980	1–1		15 Oct 1980	1–0		
UE Lleida	5–3	CF Reus Deportiu	17 Sep 1980	3–2	Rep.	1 Oct 1980	1–2	Rep.	
CE Júpiter	0–3	Terrassa FC	17 Sep 1980	0–0	Rep.	1 Oct 1980	3–0	Rep.	
Gimnàstic de Tarragona	5–5 (p)	FC Andorra	17 Sep 1980	2–1	Rep.	1 Oct 1980	3–2	Rep.	Penalties: 5–4 for FC Andorra.
Calvo Sotelo CF	4–1	AD Alcorcón	17 Sep 1980	3–0		1 Oct 1980	1–1		
CD Pegaso	3–4	CD Badajoz	17 Sep 1980	3–0		1 Oct 1980	4–0		
CD Eldense	3–6	Cartagena FC	17 Sep 1980	1–2		1 Oct 1980	4–2		
Córdoba CF	3–3 (p)	CD San Fernando	17 Sep 1980	2–1	Rep.	1 Oct 1980	2–1		Penalties: 2–0 for CD San Fernando.
RCD Mallorca	4–1	CD Murense	17 Sep 1980	4–1	Rep.	2 Oct 1980	0–0	Rep.	
Deportivo de La Coruña	6–8	Celta de Vigo	17 Sep 1980	4–3		1 Oct 1980	5–2	Rep.	
SD Ponferradina	4–3	Juventud Cambados	17 Sep 1980	4–0		1 Oct 1980	3–0		
Arousa SC	3–1	Alondras CF	17 Sep 1980	1–0		24 Sep 1980	1–2		
CD Lagun Onak	3–3 (p)	SD Eibar	17 Sep 1980	3–2		25 Sep 1980	1–0		Penalties: 4–2 for SD Eibar.
SD Gernika	2–8	Alavés Aficionados	17 Sep 1980	1–4		1 Oct 1980	4–1		
CD Binéfar	4–4 (p)	AD Sabiñánigo	17 Sep 1980	3–1		1 Oct 1980	3–1		Penalties: x–x for CD Binéfar.
CD Calahorra	4–4 (p)	CD Tudelano	17 Sep 1980	3–1		1 Oct 1980	3–1		Penalties: 4–3 for CD Tudelano.
UDA Gramenet	2–7	UE Figueres	17 Sep 1980	1–2	Rep.	1 Oct 1980	5–1	Rep.	
Vinaròs CF	3–2	CF Gandía	17 Sep 1980	0–0		1 Oct 1980	2–3	Rep.	
CF Villanovense	4–4 (p)	CD Ciempozuelos	17 Sep 1980	1–1		1 Oct 1980	3–3		Penalties: 1–3 for CF Villanovense.
CD Talavera	1–3	CD Manchego	17 Sep 1980	1–2		1 Oct 1980	1–0		
Albacete Balompié	5–1	CP Cacereño	17 Sep 1980	3–1		1 Oct 1980	0–2		
CD San Fernando de Henares	4–1	CD Toledo	17 Sep 1980	2–1		1 Oct 1980	0–2		
CD Venta de Baños	1–2	Real Valladolid Promesas	17 Sep 1980	1–2		8 Oct 1980	0–0		
CD Motril	0–3	UD San Pedro	17 Sep 1980	0–1		1 Oct 1980	2–0		
CD Felanitx	3–9	UD Poblense	17 Sep 1980	3–4		24 Sep 1980	5–0	Rep.	
CD Binissalem	2–3	SD Portmany	17 Sep 1980	1–0		1 Oct 1980	3–1		
CF Sporting Mahonés	1–3	CD Margaritense	17 Sep 1980	1–2		1 Oct 1980	1–0		
Rayo Vallecano	4–3	Mérida Industrial CF	18 Sep 1980	3–0		1 Oct 1980	3–1	Rep.	
Levante UD	2–1 (aet)	UD Carcaixent	18 Sep 1980	1–0		1 Oct 1980	1–1	Rep.	
Real Oviedo Aficionados	2–4	CD Turón	18 Sep 1980	1–1		1 Oct 1980	3–1		
CD Constància	5–2	CD Andratx	18 Sep 1980	3–0		1 Oct 1980	2–2		
CD Peña Sport	4–1	CD Sangüesa	24 Sep 1980	3–1		2 Oct 1980	0–1		
CD Béjar Industrial	0–4	Real Valladolid Deportivo	25 Sep 1980	0–0	Rep.	1 Oct 1980	4–0	Rep.	
CD Mestalla	3–2 (aet)	Villarreal CF	25 Sep 1980	2–1		1 Oct 1980	1–1	Rep.	
Betis Deportivo	0–6	Sevilla FC	22 Oct 1980	0–5	Rep.	29 Oct 1980	1–0	Rep.	
Bye by draw: FC Barcelona, Castilla CF, Real Madrid CF, Real Sociedad, Sporting de Gijón, Valencia CF.
Results of matches played: 17 September / 18 September / 24 September / 25 September / 1 October / 2 October / 8 October / 15 October

== Second round ==
Second round
Home 1st leg	Agg.	Home 2nd leg	1st leg			2nd leg			Notes
CD Turón	1–7	Sporting de Gijón	18 Nov 1980	1–6	Rep.	3 Dec 1980	1–0	Rep.	
CD Manchego	1–2	Castilla CF	18 Nov 1980	1–1	Rep.	2 Dec 1980	1–0	Rep.	
CD Binéfar	1–8	Athletic Bilbao	19 Nov 1980	1–7	Rep.	3 Dec 1980	1–0	Rep.	
RCD Espanyol	0–1	Terrassa FC	19 Nov 1980	0–0	Rep.	3 Dec 1980	1–0	Rep.	
UE Lleida	2–7	FC Barcelona	19 Nov 1980	1–2	Rep.	3 Dec 1980	5–1	Rep.	
Albacete Balompié	1–2	Valencia CF	19 Nov 1980	1–0	Rep.	4 Dec 1980	2–0	Rep.	
Cartagena FC	3–3 (p)	Hércules CF	19 Nov 1980	3–0	Rep.	3 Dec 1980	3–0	Rep.	Penalties: 3–1 for Hércules CF.
Elche CF	3–2	Real Murcia CF	19 Nov 1980	3–0	Rep.	3 Dec 1980	2–0	Rep.	
Sevilla FC	3–2	Real Betis	19 Nov 1980	2–1	Rep.	3 Dec 1980	1–1	Rep.	
AD Almería	2–0	Linares CF	19 Nov 1980	2–0	Rep.	3 Dec 1980	0–0	Rep.	
Calvo Sotelo CF	1–4	Atlético de Madrid	19 Nov 1980	1–3	Rep.	3 Dec 1980	1–0	Rep.	
Real Valladolid Promesas	2–4	UD Salamanca	19 Nov 1980	2–1	Rep.	4 Dec 1980	3–0	Rep.	
Palencia CF	3–2	Real Valladolid Deportivo	19 Nov 1980	2–1	Rep.	3 Dec 1980	1–1	Rep.	
Real Oviedo CF	6–5	UP Langreo	19 Nov 1980	3–1		3 Dec 1980	4–3		
Deportivo Alavés Aficionados	4–5	Barakaldo CF	19 Nov 1980	3–2	Rep.	3 Dec 1980	3–1		
Sestao SC	4–8	Deportivo Alavés	19 Nov 1980	1–4		3 Dec 1980	4–3		
UE Figueres	5–2	CE Sabadell FC	19 Nov 1980	3–0	Rep.	3 Dec 1980	2–2	Rep.	
CD Castellón	4–1	CD Mestalla	19 Nov 1980	4–1	Rep.	9 Dec 1980	0–0	Rep.	
Vinaròs CF	2–6	Levante UD	19 Nov 1980	2–4	Rep.	3 Dec 1980	2–0	Rep.	
Cádiz CF	4–0	CD San Fernando	19 Nov 1980	3–0	Rep.	3 Dec 1980	0–1		
CD Tenerife	1–3	Recreativo de Huelva	19 Nov 1980	1–0	Rep.	3 Dec 1980	3–0		
AD Ceuta	1–0	UD San Pedro	19 Nov 1980	0–0		3 Dec 1980	0–1		
Granada CF	3–2	CD Málaga	19 Nov 1980	2–0	Rep.	3 Dec 1980	2–1	Rep.	
Rayo Vallecano	2–0	CF Villanovense	19 Nov 1980	1–0		3 Dec 1980	0–1		
CD Badajoz	3–4	Getafe Deportivo	19 Nov 1980	2–1		3 Dec 1980	3–1		
Atlético Madrileño	4–3	CD San Fernando de Henares	19 Nov 1980	1–2		3 Dec 1980	1–3		
AD Torrejón	2–4	Burgos CF	19 Nov 1980	1–1		27 Nov 1980	3–1	Rep.	
SD Eibar	1–2	Racing de Santander	19 Nov 1980	1–1		3 Dec 1980	1–0		
Arousa SC	1–1 (p)	Celta de Vigo	19 Nov 1980	1–1		3 Dec 1980	0–0	Rep.	Penalties: 5–3 for Celta de Vigo–played on 4 Dec 1981.
SD Ponferradina	5–4	SD Compostela	19 Nov 1980	3–3		3 Dec 1980	1–2		
CD Logroñés	5–4	CD Peña Sport	19 Nov 1980	3–2		3 Dec 1980	2–2		
UD Poblense	1–2	FC Andorra	19 Nov 1980	1–1	Rep.	3 Dec 1980	1–0	Rep.	
CD Margaritense	1–5	RCD Mallorca	19 Nov 1980	1–1	Rep.	3 Dec 1980	4–0	Rep.	
CD Tudelano	2–0	Endesa Andorra	19 Nov 1980	2–0		3 Dec 1980	0–0		
SD Portmany	1–3	CD Constància	19 Nov 1980	1–0		3 Dec 1980	3–0		
Bye: Real Madrid CF, Real Sociedad.
Results of matches played: 19 November / 3 December

== Third round ==
Third round
Home 1st leg	Agg.	Home 2nd leg	1st leg			2nd leg			Notes
Deportivo Alavés	3–2 (aet)	CD Tudelano	6 Jan 1981	1–0	Rep.	28 Jan 1981	2–2	Rep.	
Atlético Madrileño	2–4	Athletic Bilbao	6 Jan 1981	1–0	Rep.	21 Jan 1981	4–1	Rep.	
AD Almería	2–4	Levante UD	7 Jan 1981	2–1	Rep.	21 Jan 1981	3–0	Rep.	
Barakaldo CF	1–3	FC Barcelona	7 Jan 1981	0–2	Rep.	21 Jan 1981	1–1	Rep.	
FC Andorra	0–4	CD Castellón	7 Jan 1981	0–0	Rep.	21 Jan 1981	4–0	Rep.	
Celta de Vigo	2–2 (p)	Burgos CF	6 Jan 1981	2–0	Rep.	21 Jan 1981	2–0	Rep.	Penalties: 5–3 for Burgos CF.
AD Ceuta	1–1 (p)	Granada CF	6 Jan 1981	1–0	Rep.	25 Feb 1981	1–0	Rep.	Penalties: 5–4 for Granada CF.
CD Constància	2–3	Castilla CF	6 Jan 1981	2–0	Rep.	28 Jan 1981	3–0	Rep.	
UE Figueres	3–2	Racing de Santander	7 Jan 1981	2–1	Rep.	21 Jan 1981	1–1	Rep.	
Hércules CF	5–2	CD Logroñés	7 Jan 1981	2–1	Rep.	21 Jan 1981	1–3	Rep.	
Recreativo de Huelva	3–3 (p)	Getafe Deportivo	6 Jan 1981	1–2	Rep.	21 Jan 1981	1–2	Rep.	Penalties: 2–4 for Recreativo de Huelva.
Real Oviedo CF	0–3	Atlético de Madrid	6 Jan 1981	0–0	Rep.	21 Jan 1981	3–0	Rep.	
Rayo Vallecano	2–0	RCD Mallorca	6 Jan 1981	1–0	Rep.	20 Jan 1981	0–1	Rep.	
UD Salamanca	1–0	Terrassa FC	6 Jan 1981	1–0	Rep.	21 Jan 1981	0–0	Rep.	
SD Ponferradina	3–8	Sporting de Gijón	7 Jan 1981	1–0	Rep.	21 Jan 1981	8–2	Rep.	
Real Sociedad	2–1	Cádiz CF	7 Jan 1981	1–1	Rep.	21 Jan 1981	0–1	Rep.	
Palencia CF	3–3 (p)	Elche CF	7 Jan 1981	2–2	Rep.	21 Jan 1981	1–1	Rep.	Penalties: 1–3 for Palencia CF.
Valencia CF	2–3	Sevilla FC	7 Jan 1981	2–2	Rep.	21 Jan 1981	1–0	Rep.	
Bye: Real Madrid CF.

== Fourth round ==
Fourth round
Home 1st leg	Agg.	Home 2nd leg	1st leg			2nd leg			Notes
CD Castellón	0–2	Recreativo de Huelva	11 Feb 1981	0–0	Rep.	25 Feb 1981	2–0	Rep.	
UE Figueres	3–3 (p)	Hércules CF	4 Mar 1981	1–0	Rep.	1 Apr 1981	3–2	Rep.	Penalties: 4–5 for UE Figueres.
Palencia CF	0–2	Burgos CF	11 Feb 1981	0–1	Rep.	19 Mar 1981	1–0	Rep.	
Bye: Deportivo Alavés, Athletic Bilbao, Levante UD, FC Barcelona, Granada CF, Castilla CF, Atlético de Madrid, Rayo Vallecano, UD Salamanca, Sporting de Gijón, Real Sociedad, Sevilla FC, Real Madrid CF.

== Bracket ==
Round of 16
1	Levante UD	0	0	0
16	Sporting de Gijón	2	3	5
8	Recreativo de Huelva	1	1	2
9	Real Madrid CF	1	4	5
5	Sevilla FC	2	1	3
12	Real Sociedad	1	1	2
4	UE Figueres	1	0	1
13	Burgos CF	1	2	3
6	Rayo Vallecano	3	0	3
11	Atlético de Madrid	0	2	2
3	Castilla CF	3	1	4
14	FC Barcelona	5	4	9
7	UD Salamanca	1	1	2
10	Granada CF	0	0	0
2	Athletic Bilbao	3	3	6
15	Deportivo Alavés	1	3	4

Quarter-finals
Sporting de Gijón	1	3	4
Real Madrid CF	1	2	3
Sevilla FC	1	3	4
Burgos CF	1	0	1
Rayo Vallecano	0	1	1
FC Barcelona	3	3	6
UD Salamanca	2	0	2
Athletic Bilbao	1	2	3

Semi-finals
Sporting de Gijón	2	0	2
Sevilla FC	0	0	0
FC Barcelona	2	2	4
Athletic Bilbao	0	1	1

Final
Sporting de Gijón	1
FC Barcelona	3

== Round of 16 ==
Team 1	Agg.	Team 2	1st leg	2nd leg
Levante	0–5	Sporting de Gijón	0-2	0-3
Recreativo de Huelva	2–5	Real Madrid	1-1	1-4
Sevilla	3–2 (aet)	Real Sociedad	2-1	1-1
Figueras	1–3 (aet)	Burgos	1-1	0-2
Rayo Vallecano	3–2	Atlético de Madrid	3-0	0-2
Castilla	4–9	Barcelona	3-5	1-4
Salamanca	2–0	Granada	1-0	1-0
Athletic Bilbao	6–4	Alavés	3-1	3-3

=== First leg ===
29 April 1981	Athletic Bilbao	3–1	Deportivo Alavés	Bilbao
20:00 CET	Argote 1'; Noriega 29'; Sarabia 37'	Report (in Spanish)	Chechu 5'	Stadium: San Mamés; Referee: Antonio Martín Navarrete

29 April 1981	UD Salamanca	1–0	Granada CF	Villares de la Reina
20:30 CET	Corominas 34'	Report (in Spanish)		Stadium: El Helmántico; Referee: Raúl García de Loza

29 April 1981	Levante UD	0–2	Sporting de Gijón	Valencia
20:45 CET		Report (in Spanish)	Mesa 65'; Ferrero 70'	Stadium: Ciudad de Valencia; Referee: Antonio Borrás del Barrio

29 April 1981	Rayo Vallecano	3–0	Atlético de Madrid	Madrid
20:45 CET	Fraile 4'; Paco 7'; Robles 23'	Report (in Spanish)		Stadium: Nuevo Estadio de Vallecas; Referee: José Luis García Carrión

29 April 1981	Figueras	1–1	Burgos CF	Figueres
21:30 CET	Serra 35'	Report (in Spanish)	Dacosta 83'	Stadium: El Far; Attendance: 7,000; Referee: Jaime David Bayarri Ribelles

29 April 1981	Sevilla FC	2–1	Real Sociedad	Sevilla
21:30 CET	Juan Carlos 71'; Montero 81'	Report (in Spanish)	López Ufarte 55' (pen.)	Stadium: Ramón Sánchez Pizjuán; Attendance: 35.250; Referee: Augusto Lamo Castillo

30 April 1981	Castilla	3–5	FC Barcelona	Madrid
20:45 CET	Ortiz 9'; Paco 51'; Blanco 57'	Report (in Spanish)	Landáburu 5'; Quini 13'; Zuviría 65'; Migueli 69'; Simonsen 85'	Stadium: Santiago Bernabéu; Referee: Joaquín Urío Velázquez

30 April 1981	Recreativo de Huelva	1–1	Real Madrid CF	Huelva
21:15 CET	Aguirre 14'	Report (in Spanish)	Santillana 40'	Stadium: Municipal de Huelva; Referee: José Merino González

=== Second leg ===
5 May 1981	FC Barcelona	4–1	Castilla	Barcelona
— CET	Quini 3', 47'; Esteban 15'; Landáburu 89'	Report (in Spanish)	Paco 55'	Stadium: Camp Nou; Referee: Manuel Fandos Hernández

5 May 1981	Atlético de Madrid	2–0	Rayo Vallecano	Madrid
	Marcos 44'; Quique Ramos 52' (pen.)	Report (in Spanish)		Stadium: Vicente Calderón; Referee: Ildefonso Urizar Azpitarte

6 May 1981	Real Sociedad	1–1 (a.e.t.)	Sevilla FC	San Sebastián
20:00 CET	Zamora 46'	Report (in Spanish)	Choya 114'	Stadium: Atotxa; Attendance: 25,000; Referee: Emilio Soriano Aladrén

6 May 1981	Deportivo Alavés	3–3	Athletic Bilbao	Vitoria-Gasteiz
20:00 CET	Juani 8'; Morgado 25'; Urrecho 88'	Report (in Spanish)	Dani 6'; Garmendia 35' (o.g.); Sola 84'	Stadium: Mendizorroza; Referee: Ángel Franco Martínez

6 May 1981	Sporting de Gijón	3–0	Levante UD	Gijón
20:15 CET	Abel 55'; Joaquín 57'; Pedro 77'	Report (in Spanish)		Stadium: El Molinón; Referee: Jacinto de Sosa Martín

6 May 1981	Burgos	2–0 (a.e.t.)	Figueras	Burgos
20:30 CET	López 108'; Magdaleno 111'	Report (in Spanish)		Stadium: El Plantío; Referee: Rafael Díaz Agüero

6 May 1981	Real Madrid CF	4–1	Recreativo de Huelva	Madrid
20:45 CET	Isidro 45'; Juanito 49', 70' (pen.); Pineda 87'	Report (in Spanish)	Navarro 64' (pen.)	Stadium: Santiago Bernabéu; Referee: Benito Alfonso Condón Uriz

6 May 1981	Granada CF	0–1	UD Salamanca	Granada
21:00 CET		Report (in Spanish)	Ito 15'	Stadium: Los Cármenes; Referee: Emilio Carlos Guruceta Muro

== Quarter-finals ==
Team 1	Agg.	Team 2	1st leg	2nd leg
Sporting de Gijón	4–3	Real Madrid	1-1	3-2
Sevilla	4–1	Burgos	4-1	0-0
Rayo Vallecano	1–6	Barcelona	0-3	1-3
Salamanca	2–3 (aet)	Athletic Bilbao	2-1	0-2

=== First leg ===
20 May 1981	Sporting de Gijón	1–1	Real Madrid CF	Gijón
20:15 CET	Ciriaco 40'	Report (in Spanish)	Sabido 85'	Stadium: El Molinón; Referee: Victoriano Sánchez Arminio

20 May 1981	Rayo Vallecano	0–3	FC Barcelona	Madrid
21:00 CET		Report (in Spanish)	Simonsen 33', 62'; Estella 68'	Stadium: Nuevo Estadio de Vallecas; Referee: José Donato Pes Pérez

20 May 1981	Sevilla FC	4–1	Burgos CF	Sevilla
21:30 CET	Juan Carlos 6'; Montero 37', 74'; Pintinho 62' (pen.)	Report (in Spanish)	Cholo 79'	Stadium: Ramón Sánchez Pizjuán; Referee: José Díez Frías

24 May 1981	UD Salamanca	2–1	Athletic Bilbao	Villares de la Reina
18:30 CET	Teixidó 31', 77' (pen.)	Report (in Spanish)	Argote 2'	Stadium: El Helmántico; Attendance: 8,000; Referee: José María Miguel Pérez

=== Second leg ===
30 May 1981	Athletic Bilbao	2–0 (a.e.t.)	UD Salamanca	Bilbao
20:00 CET	Dani 40' (pen.); Noriega 100'	Report (in Spanish)		Stadium: San Mamés; Referee: Fermín Sánchez Molina

30 May 1981	Burgos CF	0–0	Sevilla FC	Burgos
20:30 CET		Report (in Spanish)		Stadium: El Plantío; Referee: Ernesto de Burgos Núñez

31 May 1981	FC Barcelona	3–1	Rayo Vallecano	Barcelona
18:00 CET	Sánchez 17'; Alexanko 64'; Carrasco 89'	Report (in Spanish)	Uceda 50' (pen.)	Stadium: Camp Nou; Referee: Manuel Álvarez Margüenda

31 May 1981	Real Madrid CF	2–3	Sporting de Gijón	Madrid
20:00 CET	García Navajas 38'; Stielike 70'	Report (in Spanish)	Abel 30', 67', 71'	Stadium: Santiago Bernabéu; Referee: José María Enríquez Negreira

== Semi-finals ==
Team 1	Agg.	Team 2	1st leg	2nd leg
Sporting de Gijón	2–0	Sevilla	2-0	0-0
Barcelona	4–1	Athletic Bilbao	2-0	2-1

=== First leg ===
7 June 1981	Sporting de Gijón	2–0	Sevilla FC	Gijón
18:30 CET	Abel 25'; Pedro 40'	Report (in Spanish)		Stadium: El Molinón; Referee: Augusto Lamo Castillo

7 June 1981	FC Barcelona	2–0	Athletic Bilbao	Barcelona
	Estella 35'; Quini 45'	Report (in Spanish)		Stadium: Camp Nou; Referee: José Luis García Carrión

=== Second leg ===
13 June 1981	Athletic Bilbao	1–2	FC Barcelona	Bilbao
20:00 CET	Noriega 11'	Report (in Spanish)	Quini 60'; Sánchez 88'	Stadium: San Mamés; Referee: Victoriano Sánchez Arminio

13 June 1981	Sevilla FC	0–0	Sporting de Gijón	Sevilla
21:30 CET		Report (in Spanish)		Stadium: Ramón Sánchez Pizjuán; Referee: José Donato Pes Pérez

== Final ==
18 June 1981
21:00 CET

Sporting de Gijón	1–3	FC Barcelona
Maceda 50'	Report (in Spanish)	Quini 44', 58'; Esteban 66'

Vicente Calderón, Madrid
Attendance: 50,000
Referee: Emilio Soriano Aladrén

Copa del Rey
1980–81 winners
FC Barcelona
19th title
