= Petar Baralić =

Serbian footballer

Personal information
- Date of birth: October 3, 1951 (age 75)
- Place of birth: Čačak, PR Serbia, FPR Yugoslavia
- Positions: Forward; midfielder

Senior career*
| Years | Team | Apps | (Gls) |
| 1968–1973 | Borac Čačak | | |
| 1973–1979 | Red Star Belgrade | | |
| 1979–1980 | Tampa Bay Rowdies | 50 | (14) |
| 1979–1980 | Tampa Bay Rowdies (indoor) | 12 | (21) |
| 1981 | Detroit Express (indoor) | 12 | (4) |
| 1981 | Washington Diplomats | 25 | (4) |
| 1981–1983 | Baltimore Blast (indoor) | 76 | (52) |
| 1983 | Tampa Bay Rowdies | 14 | (3) |
| 1983–1984 | Phoenix Pride (indoor) | 38 | (23) |
| 1984–1985 | Kansas City Comets (indoor) | 17 | (5) |

Managerial career
- Phoenix Heat
- 1989–1991: Phoenix Hearts
- * Club domestic league appearances and goals

Petar "Peter" Baralic (Serbian Cyrillic: Петар Баралић, born 3 October 1951) is a retired Yugoslavia national football team and Olympic Team "Captain" football player who played professionally in Europe and in the North American Soccer League and Major Indoor Soccer League. He played for the highly ranked Red Star team in Europe. He coached the Arizona Sandsharks and Arizona Thunder. He also coached the Phoenix Hearts of the Southwest Indoor Soccer League. He was the 1990 SISL Coach of the Year.

== Player ==
In Yugoslavia, he played for Borac Čačak and Red Star Belgrade.

In 1979, Baralic signed with the Tampa Bay Rowdies of the North American Soccer League. He played two seasons with the Rowdies, including the 1979-1980 NASL indoor season. In January 1981, the Detroit Express purchased Baralic from the Rowdies. At the end of the 1980–1981 NASL indoor season, the Express moved to Washington, D.C., and were renamed the Washington Diplomats. In the fall of 1981, Baralic moved to the Baltimore Blast of the Major Indoor Soccer League. He played four seasons in the MISL for the Blast, Phoenix Pride and Kansas City Comets.

== Coach ==
In 1987, Baralic became the head coach of the semi-professional indoor club, the Phoenix Heat. In 1990, he was hired as the head coach of the Phoenix Hearts of the Southwest Indoor Soccer League. He was the 1989–90 Southwest Independent Soccer League indoor season Coach of the Year.
