= Augusto Lamo Castillo =

Spanish football referee (1938–2002)

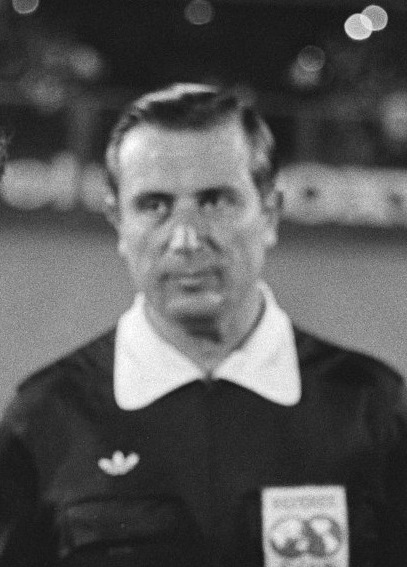
- Born: 25 September 1938; Badajoz, Spain
- Died: 10 September 2002 (aged 63)

Domestic
Years	League	Role
1974-1986	RFEF	Referee

International
Years	League	Role
1978-1986	UEFA	Referee
1978-1986	FIFA	Referee

Augusto Lamo Castillo (25 September 1938 in Badajoz – 10 September 2002) was a Spanish football referee. He is known for having refereed one match in the 1982 FIFA World Cup on his home soil in Spain. He also refereed one match in the 1984 UEFA European Football Championship in France.
