= David López (footballer, born 1956) =

Spanish footballer

David
Personal information
- Full name: Jorge David López Fernández
- Date of birth: 23 April 1956 (age 70)
- Place of birth: Turón, Spain
- Height: 1.74 m (5 ft 8 1/2 in)
- Position: Midfielder

Youth career
- La Salle Turón
- Real Madrid

Senior career*
Years	Team	Apps	(Gls)
1974–1978	Sporting Gijón B		
1978–1985	Sporting Gijón	88	(2)
1981–1982	→ Zamora (loan)	12	(3)
1985–1986	Levante	24	(4)
Total		124	(9)

International career
1980	Spain U23	1	(0)
1979–1980	Spain amateur	13	(0)
1980	Spain B	1	(0)
- * Club domestic league appearances and goals

Jorge David López Fernández (born 23 April 1956 in Turón, Asturias), known simply as David, is a Spanish former professional footballer who played as a midfielder.

== Honours ==
Sporting Gijón

- Copa del Rey runner-up: 1980–81, 1981–82
