= Emilio Soriano Aladrén =

Spanish football referee

Emilio Soriano Aladrén (born 29 October 1945 in Zaragoza) is a retired Spanish football referee. He officiated at one match in the 1990 FIFA World Cup and two matches in the UEFA European Championship (one in 1988 and one in 1992).
