= Enzo Ferrero =

Argentine footballer and manager

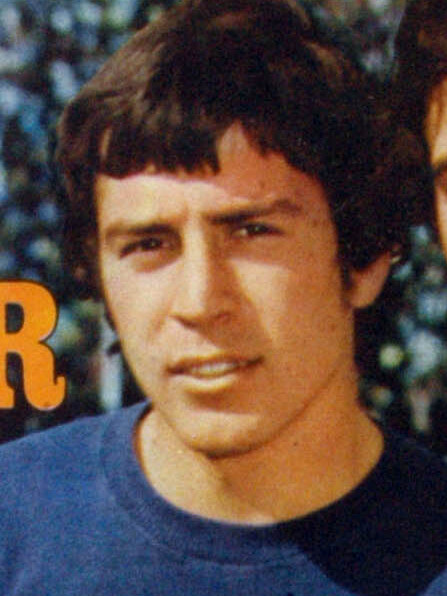
- Ferrero with Boca Juniors

Personal information
- Full name: Enzo Ferrero Águila
- Date of birth: 3 January 1953 (age 73)
- Place of birth: Campana, Argentina
- Height: 1.75 m (5 ft 9 in)
- Position: Left winger

Senior career*
| Years | Team | Apps | (Gls) |
| 1971–1975 | Boca Juniors | 169 | (39) |
| 1975–1985 | Sporting Gijón | 241 | (54) |

International career
| 1972 | Argentina youth | | |
| 1974 | Argentina | 3 | (1) |

Managerial career
- 2001–2004: Gijón Industrial
- 2005–2006: Astur
- * Club domestic league appearances and goals as of October 2008

Enzo Ferrero Águila (born 3 January 1953 in Campana) is a retired Argentine footballer who played for Boca Juniors in Argentina and Sporting de Gijón in Spain. He is regarded as one of Sporting Gijón's greatest-ever players.

Ferrero started his professional playing career on September 9, 1971, in a 3–0 win over Los Andes. He went on to play 169 times for Boca Juniors scoring 39 goals.

He played for the Argentina youth team in 1972 and made his debut for the Argentina national team in 1974.

In 1975, Ferrero joined Spanish side Sporting de Gijón where he became an idol, he played for the club until his retirement in 1985.

Ferrero was manager of UD Gijón Industrial for three years, where he led the team to promotion to the Spanish Tercera División. He has also managed Astur CF.

== Honours ==
=== Player ===
Sporting Gijón

- Segunda División: 1976–77
- Primera División runner-up: 1978–79
- Copa del Rey runner-up (2): 1980–81, 1981–82
