= 1978–79 La Liga =

48th season of La Liga

Primera División
- Season: 1978–79
- Dates: 2 September 1978 – 3 June 1979
- Champions: Real Madrid (19th title)
- Relegated: Celta Vigo; Racing Santander; Recreativo
- European Cup: Real Madrid
- UEFA Cup Winners' Cup: Barcelona (as title holders); Valencia
- UEFA Cup: Sporting Gijón; Atlético Madrid; Real Sociedad
- Matches: 306
- Goals: 825 (2.7 per match)
- Top goalscorer: Hans Krankl (29 goals)

The 1978–79 La Liga was the 48th season since its establishment. It began on 2 September 1978, and concluded on 3 June 1979.

== Team locations ==
Location of teams in La Liga 1978–79
Canary Islands

Team	Home city	Stadium
Athletic Bilbao	Bilbao	San Mamés
Atlético Madrid	Madrid	Vicente Calderón
Barcelona	Barcelona	Nou Camp
Burgos	Burgos	El Plantío
Celta	Vigo	Balaídos
Español	Barcelona	Sarriá
Hércules	Alicante	José Rico Pérez
Las Palmas	Las Palmas	Insular
Racing Santander	Santander	El Sardinero
Rayo Vallecano	Madrid	Vallecas
Real Madrid	Madrid	Santiago Bernabéu
Real Sociedad	San Sebastián	Atocha
Recretivo	Huelva	Colombino
Salamanca	Villares de la Reina	Helmántico
Sevilla	Seville	Ramón Sánchez Pizjuán
Sporting Gijón	Gijón	El Molinón
Valencia	Valencia	Luis Casanova
Zaragoza	Zaragoza	La Romareda

== League table ==
Pos	Team	Pld	W	D	L	GF	GA	GD	Pts	Qualification or relegation
1	Real Madrid (C)	34	16	15	3	61	36	+25	47	Qualification for the European Cup first round
2	Sporting Gijón	34	17	9	8	50	35	+15	43	Qualification for the UEFA Cup first round
3	Atlético Madrid	34	14	13	7	55	37	+18	41	Qualification for the UEFA Cup first round
4	Real Sociedad	34	18	5	11	53	36	+17	41	Qualification for the UEFA Cup first round
5	Barcelona	34	16	6	12	69	37	+32	38	Qualification for the Cup Winners' Cup first round (Note: Valencia qualified to the Cup Winners' Cup as winners of the Copa del Rey and Barcelona as title holders of the competition.)
6	Las Palmas	34	14	9	11	49	43	+6	37	
7	Valencia	34	14	7	13	44	39	+5	35	Qualification for the Cup Winners' Cup first round
8	Español	34	15	5	14	37	46	−9	35	
9	Athletic Bilbao	34	12	10	12	56	46	+10	34	
10	Salamanca	34	13	8	13	36	40	−4	34	
11	Sevilla	34	12	9	13	47	48	−1	33	
12	Hércules	34	13	6	15	32	38	−6	32	
13	Burgos	34	10	12	12	38	47	−9	32	
14	Zaragoza	34	12	6	16	56	59	−3	30	
15	Rayo Vallecano	34	9	11	14	31	54	−23	29	
16	Celta Vigo (R)	34	9	10	15	35	55	−20	28	Relegation to the Segunda División
17	Racing Santander (R)	34	9	4	21	37	63	−26	22	Relegation to the Segunda División
18	Recreativo (R)	34	8	5	21	39	66	−27	21	Relegation to the Segunda División

Source: BDFútbol
Rules for classification: 1) Points; 2) Head-to-head results; 3) Goal difference; 4) Number of goals scored
(C) Champions; (R) Relegated

== Results table ==
Home \ Away	ATH	ATM	BAR	BUR	CEL	ESP	HÉR	LPA	RAC	RAY	RMA	RSO	REC	SAL	SEV	SPG	VAL	ZAR
Athletic Bilbao		2–1	3–1	1–2	3–1	1–0	4–1	3–0	4–1	2–0	3–3	1–1	5–3	3–0	2–3	1–1	2–0	2–2
Atlético Madrid	4–0		1–1	1–2	4–0	1–0	3–0	1–1	3–0	0–0	2–2	2–2	1–0	1–0	2–2	0–0	2–1	3–1
FC Barcelona	4–3	2–4		2–0	6–0	2–1	3–0	4–0	1–0	9–0	2–0	1–3	2–0	3–0	1–0	6–0	1–1	5–0
Burgos	1–0	0–1	1–0		1–0	1–0	0–0	1–1	1–0	1–1	2–2	1–1	1–0	1–0	2–2	0–2	1–1	1–1
Celta de Vigo	0–0	2–2	2–1	3–2		0–1	2–1	1–2	2–0	2–1	2–2	1–0	3–2	1–1	1–1	1–1	0–0	5–3
RCD Español	1–0	2–1	0–2	1–0	1–1		2–1	2–1	2–3	2–1	1–1	2–0	1–0	2–1	2–0	1–0	1–0	1–0
Hércules CF	0–1	0–0	0–2	1–0	2–0	3–3		1–0	1–0	4–1	1–2	0–0	2–0	1–0	1–0	1–0	3–0	1–0
UD Las Palmas	1–1	1–0	2–1	3–1	0–0	3–0	2–1		1–2	1–2	2–2	2–0	3–0	4–0	2–1	0–0	2–0	0–0
Racing de Santander	1–1	1–1	2–1	2–2	2–0	0–1	0–2	2–4		1–0	1–1	1–0	1–0	2–4	2–3	0–2	3–1	3–2
Rayo Vallecano	1–0	1–3	1–1	2–2	2–0	2–0	3–0	2–2	2–1		1–1	0–4	1–1	0–0	1–0	2–1	0–1	1–0
Real Madrid	2–1	1–1	3–1	4–1	2–0	0–0	0–0	1–1	5–1	4–1		2–1	4–0	3–1	1–1	3–2	2–1	2–1
Real Sociedad	2–1	0–2	2–0	4–1	1–0	2–1	2–1	2–0	3–0	2–0	0–0		2–3	3–1	2–1	2–0	1–0	4–1
Recreativo de Huelva	3–2	0–1	0–0	1–5	1–2	3–1	3–1	2–4	2–1	0–0	1–2	1–2		1–2	2–1	1–1	4–3	3–0
UD Salamanca	1–0	2–2	1–0	1–1	1–0	2–0	1–0	1–0	1–0	1–1	1–1	1–3	2–0		3–1	0–0	3–1	3–1
Sevilla FC	0–0	1–1	1–1	1–1	1–0	4–3	1–0	0–1	3–1	2–0	2–1	1–0	6–1	2–1		1–1	0–2	1–0
Sporting de Gijón	4–3	4–1	3–1	3–0	2–2	0–0	2–0	3–1	1–0	3–0	0–1	3–2	2–0	1–0	2–0		2–0	1–0
Valencia CF	0–0	2–0	2–1	1–0	4–0	2–1	0–0	3–1	3–1	1–1	0–1	1–0	1–0	0–0	5–2	4–0		3–1
Zaragoza	1–1	4–3	1–1	4–2	2–1	8–1	1–2	3–1	3–2	2–0	1–0	4–0	1–1	1–0	3–2	1–3	3–0	

Legend: Blue = home team win; Yellow = draw; Red = away team win.

== Pichichi Trophy ==
Rank	Player	Club	Goals
1	(Austria) Hans Krankl	Barcelona	29
2	(Spain) Quini	Sporting Gijón	23
3	(Spain) Jesús María Satrústegui	Real Sociedad	20
4	(Spain) Pichi Alonso	Zaragoza	19
4	(Spain) Rubén Cano	Atlético Madrid	19
6	(Spain) Santillana	Real Madrid	18
7	(Argentina) Carlos Morete	Las Palmas	16
8	(Argentina) Miguel Ángel Brindisi	Las Palmas	14
9	(Spain) Dani	Athletic Bilbao	13
