= Jesús Castro (Spanish footballer) =

Spanish footballer (1951–1993)

Personal information
- Full name: Jesús Antonio Castro González
- Date of birth: 23 January 1951
- Place of birth: Oviedo, Spain
- Date of death: 26 July 1993 (aged 42)
- Place of death: Pechón, Spain
- Height: 1.83 m (6 ft 0 in)
- Position: Goalkeeper

Youth career
- 1966–1968: Ensidesa

Senior career*
Years	Team	Apps	(Gls)
1968–1985	Sporting Gijón	417	(0)

International career
1971	Spain U23	6	(0)
1969–1974	Spain amateur	16	(0)
- * Club domestic league appearances and goals

Jesús Antonio Castro González (23 January 1951 – 26 July 1993) was a Spanish professional footballer who played as a goalkeeper.

He appeared in 315 La Liga games over 14 seasons with his only club, Sporting de Gijón.

== Club career ==
Born in Oviedo, Asturias, Castro spent his entire professional career with neighbouring club Sporting de Gijón, signing on 11 March 1968 from local amateurs CD Ensidesa. He totalled 64 Segunda División appearances in his first three seasons, including all 38 games in 1969–70 to help the team to promote to La Liga as champions.

Castro made his debut in the top flight on 13 September 1970, in a 2–0 away loss against RC Celta de Vigo. He finished the campaign with 25 matches, in an eventual 12th-place finish.

From 1971 until 1985, Castro all but competed in the top tier. Following the emergence of fellow youth graduate Juan Carlos Ablanedo and a herniated disc injury from which he never recovered and that led to him becoming the first Spanish player to be eligible for a disability grant, he retired at the age of 36. Over the course of three separate editions, he appeared in eight UEFA Cup games.

== Personal life ==
Castro's older brother, Enrique (generally known as Quini), was also a footballer. A striker, he too spent several years with Sporting, also representing FC Barcelona and Spain. With 763 appearances between the siblings in the Spanish top flight, they ranked second in this list behind Julio and Patxi Salinas at the time of their retirement.

== Death ==
On 26 July 1993, aged 42, Castro rescued two English boys and their father from drowning in the beach of Pechón, in Cantabria. He managed to do so but, exhausted, died shortly after.

== Honours ==
- Segunda División: 1969–70, 1976–77

== See also ==
- List of one-club men
