= Ciriaco Cano =

Spanish footballer and coach

Personal information
- Full name: Ciriaco Cano González
- Date of birth: 4 August 1948 (age 78)
- Place of birth: Plasencia, Spain
- Height: 1.76 m (5 ft 9 1/2 in)
- Position: Midfielder

Youth career
- Elche

Senior career*
Years	Team	Apps	(Gls)
1967–1968	Elche B		
1968–1971	Elche	47	(1)
1971–1983	Sporting Gijón	301	(29)
Total		348	(30)

Managerial career
- 1988–1989: Gijón Industrial
- 1989–1990: Cacereño
- 1990–1992: Sporting Gijón
- 1992–1994: Castellón
- Plasencia
- 1997–1998: Elche
- 2000: Sporting Gijón
- 2000–2001: Badajoz
- 2001: Leganés
- 2004–2005: Langreo
- 2005–2006: Sporting Gijón
- * Club domestic league appearances and goals

Ciriaco Cano González (born 4 August 1948) is a retired Spanish footballer who played as a midfielder for Sporting de Gijón. After retiring as a player, he went on to coach, including for Sporting de Gijón.
