= Manuel Mesa =

Spanish footballer and manager

Personal information
- Full name: Manuel Mesa Quirós
- Date of birth: 26 December 1952 (age 73)
- Place of birth: San Roque, Spain
- Height: 1.75 m (5 ft 9 in)
- Position: Winger

Senior career*
Years	Team	Apps	(Gls)
1971–1975	Linense		
1975–1987	Sporting Gijón	339	(36)
1987	Murcia	0	(0)
1987–1988	Linense	32	(2)
1988–1991	Xerez	93	(4)
1991–1992	Linense	18	(1)
Total		482	(43)

International career
1979–1980	Spain	2	(1)

Managerial career
- 2004–2009: San Roque
- * Club domestic league appearances and goals

Manuel 'Manolo' Mesa Quirós (born 26 December 1952) is a Spanish former professional footballer who played as a right winger.

His career was intimately connected with Sporting de Gijón with whom he spent 12 years, amassing La Liga totals of 311 games and 34 goals over 11 seasons and appearing in 443 competitive matches.

== Club career ==
Born in San Roque, Province of Cádiz, Andalusia, Mesa started playing football at local side Real Balompédica Linense. In 1975, after having been discovered by renowned scout Enrique Casas, he was bought by Sporting de Gijón, making his La Liga debut on 28 December in a 1–0 away loss against UD Salamanca and adding a further ten appearances during that season, which ended in relegation.

From 1978 onwards, with the Asturias team back in the top flight, Mesa played an essential part in their domestic consolidation, helping to a runner-up place in the 1978–79 campaign, back-to-back Copa del Rey finals in the early 80s – both lost – and four UEFA Cup participations; due to his incredible stamina, he earned the nickname Siete Pulmones (Seven Lungs).

Mesa appeared in 43 matches in 1986–87, scoring seven goals (both career-highs) to help Sporting finish in fourth position. As the player, aged nearly 35, was becoming less productive, his contract was not renewed and he joined Real Murcia CF also of the top tier, but left unsettled after a couple of weeks.

Mesa then moved closer to his hometown and signed for Xerez CD in the Segunda División, producing three respectable seasons but being relegated in his last. Six months shy of his 40th birthday, he retired after one year with his first club Linense.

Subsequently, Mesa coached amateurs CD San Roque for a few years, also working with his birthplace's city hall in the sports department.

== International career ==
Mesa played twice for Spain, making his debut on 14 November 1979 and scoring in a 1–3 friendly loss to Denmark in Cádiz. In the early minutes of his second appearance, another exhibition match against Czechoslovakia on 16 April 1980, he suffered a serious injury – having to be replaced by Sporting Gijón teammate Quini – and was never recalled again.

== Honours ==
Sporting Gijón

- Segunda División: 1976–77
