= 1998–99 Sporting de Gijón season =

Real Sporting
1998–99 season
- Chairman: Germán Ojeda
- Manager: Pedro Braojos
- Stadium: El Molinón
- Segunda División: 9th
- Copa del Rey: Fourth round
- Top goalscorer: Dmitri Cheryshev (13)
- Average home league attendance: 12,797

The 1998–99 Sporting de Gijón season was the first season of the club in Segunda División after its last relegation from La Liga, beating the record of less points in a season and the record of most games without earning a win.

== Overview ==
Four coaches managed the team in a very tough season, where the club did not win any league match until the round 9.

Antonio López Habas started managing the team until he was sacked after the round 6. José Antonio Redondo was the caretaker during two weeks until Dutch Aad de Mos arrived to take the helm of the team. He was sacked after the round 19, being substituted by Pedro Braojos, who finally ended the season.

After the end of the season, Juan Carlos Ablanedo retired from football. The goalkeeper played 401 league games with Sporting de Gijón.

== Squad ==
Note: Flags indicate national team as defined under FIFA eligibility rules; some limited exceptions apply. Players may hold more than one non-FIFA nationality.

No.	Pos.	Nation	Player
1	GK	ESP	Juan Carlos Ablanedo
2	DF	ESP	Iván Otero
3	DF	ESP	Mingo
4	DF	ESP	Rubén Darío Acebal
5	DF	ESP	José Jesús Mesas
6	DF	ESP	Vicente
7	MF	ESP	Mario
8	MF	ESP	David Cano
9	FW	MAR	Abdeljalil Hadda
10	MF	GRE	Takis Gonias
11	MF	ESP	José Manuel
12	MF	YUG	Marko Perović
13	GK	ESP	Sergio Sánchez

No.	Pos.	Nation	Player
14	MF	ESP	Fredi
15	MF	RUS	Igor Lediakhov
16	DF	BOL	Luis Cristaldo
17	FW	ESP	Monchu
18	MF	ESP	Óscar Arias
19	FW	ESP	Kaiku
20	DF	ESP	Isma
21	DF	ESP	Sergio
22	MF	ESP	Manolo
23	MF	ESP	Antonio Poyatos
24	FW	RUS	Dmitri Cheryshev
25	GK	ESP	Juanjo

=== From the youth squad ===
Note: Flags indicate national team as defined under FIFA eligibility rules; some limited exceptions apply. Players may hold more than one non-FIFA nationality.

No.	Pos.	Nation	Player
26	DF	ESP	Urbano
27	MF	ESP	Miguel Cobas
28	DF	ESP	Yago
29	FW	ESP	Rubén Suárez
30	MF	ESP	Salvador Capín

No.	Pos.	Nation	Player
31	DF	ESP	Borja Sánchez
32	FW	ESP	Nacho García
36	MF	ESP	Sergio Lara
37	FW	ESP	Miguel
38	MF	ESP	Alberto

== Competitions ==
=== La Liga ===
==== Results by round ====
Round	1	2	3	4	5	6	7	8	9	10	11	12	13	14	15	16	17	18	19	20	21	22	23	24	25	26	27	28	29	30	31	32	33	34	35	36	37	38	39	40	41	42
Ground	H	A	A	H	A	H	A	H	A	H	A	H	A	H	A	H	A	H	A	H	A	A	H	H	A	H	A	H	A	H	A	H	A	H	A	H	A	H	A	H	A	H
Result	D	L	D	L	L	L	L	L	W	L	D	D	W	L	W	D	L	D	L	W	D	W	W	D	L	W	L	D	W	L	D	W	L	W	D	W	W	W	W	W	L	W
Position	10	16	17	20	22	22	22	22	22	22	20	21	20	21	19	18	19	19	19	19	19	18	18	18	18	18	18	18	17	17	18	17	18	18	17	15	14	13	12	10	12	9

Source: BDFutbol
A = Away; H = Home; W = Win; D = Draw; L = Loss

==== League table ====
Pos	Team	Pld	W	D	L	GF	GA	GD	Pts
7	Toledo	42	18	11	13	54	49	+5	65
8	Compostela	42	16	13	13	60	53	+7	61
9	Sporting de Gijón	42	16	11	15	47	47	0	59
10	Mérida	42	15	14	13	48	41	+7	59
11	Lleida	42	15	14	13	52	50	+2	59

Rules for classification: 1st points; 2nd head-to-head points; 3rd head-to-head goal difference; 4th head-to-head goals scored; 5th goal difference; 6th number of goals scored; 7th Fair-play points

==== Matches ====
30 August 1998 1	Real Sporting	0–0	Toledo	Gijón
		Summary		Stadium: El Molinón; Referee: Fernández Hinojosa

6 September 1998 2	Eibar	2–1	Real Sporting	Eibar
	Kortina 27'; Urrutia 85'	Summary	Hadda 3' (red card) 89'	Stadium: Ipurua; Referee: Pino Zamorano

13 September 1998 3	Málaga	1–1	Real Sporting	Málaga
	Guede 26'; Agostinho (yellow card) (yellow-red card) 44'	Summary	Monchu 16'	Stadium: La Rosaleda; Referee: Turienzo Álvarez

12 September 1998 4	Real Sporting	0–2	Las Palmas	Gijón
		Summary	Socorro 39', 48'	Stadium: El Molinón; Referee: Téllez Sánchez

28 September 1998 5	Mallorca B	2–0	Real Sporting	Palma
	Luque 15', 63'	Summary		Stadium: Lluís Sitjar; Referee: Pinar Martínez

4 October 1998 6	Real Sporting	0–3	Atlético Madrid B	Gijón
	Mesas (red card) 56'	Report	Tevenet 3'; Sequeiros 48', 56'	Stadium: El Molinón; Referee: Ramírez Domínguez

10 October 1998 7	Rayo Vallecano	2–1	Real Sporting	Madrid
	Vergara 51'; Pablo Sanz 55'	Summary	Óscar (red card) 41'; Mario 74'	Stadium: Vallecas; Referee: González Vázquez

18 October 1998 8	Real Sporting	0–1	Logroñés	Gijón
		Summary	Nayim 47' (pen.); Uriz (yellow card) (yellow-red card) 88'	Stadium: El Molinón; Referee: Rubio Iniesta

25 October 1998 9	Lleida	0–1	Real Sporting	Lleida
		Report	Mario 37'; Sergio (yellow card) (yellow-red card) 47'; Vicente (yellow card) (yellow-red card) 78'	Stadium: Camp d'Esports; Referee: Eleicegui Uranga

1 November 1998 10	Real Sporting	0–2	Numancia	Gijón
		Report	Castaño 13'; Javi Moreno 55'	Stadium: El Molinón; Referee: Tristante Oliva

7 November 1998 11	Compostela	2–2	Real Sporting	Santiago de Compostela
	Cabrejo 14'; Chiba 53'	Report	Rubén 64' (pen.); Hadda 67'	Stadium: San Lázaro; Referee: Moreno Delgado

15 November 1998 12	Real Sporting	2–2	Sevilla	Gijón
	Cristaldo 54' (yellow card) (yellow-red card) 83'; Takis 77'	Summary	Paco Peña 44'; Gluščević 50'	Stadium: El Molinón; Referee: Montesinos Mariano

22 November 1998 13	Ourense	1–2	Real Sporting	Ourense
	Kortina 34'	Report	Nacho García 16'; Isma 76'	Stadium: O Couto; Referee: Téllez Sánchez

29 November 1998 14	Real Sporting	0–1	Recreativo	Gijón
		Report	Ferreira 33'	Stadium: El Molinón; Referee: Pinar Martínez

6 December 1998 15	Mérida	0–1	Real Sporting	Mérida
		Summary	Hadda 89'	Stadium: Romano; Referee: Ramírez Domínguez

13 December 1998 16	Real Sporting	0–0	Leganés	Gijón
		Summary		Stadium: El Molinón; Referee: Rodríguez Martel

20 December 1998 17	Badajoz	2–0	Real Sporting	Badajoz
	Carlos Torres 3'; P. D'Amico 72'	Summary	Cobas (yellow card) (yellow-red card) 57'	Stadium: Nuevo Vivero; Referee: Llonch Andreu

3 January 1999 18	Real Sporting	1–1	Osasuna	Gijón
	Miguel 89'	Report	Trzeciak 71'	Stadium: El Molinón; Referee: Valle Gil

10 January 1999 19	Hércules	1–0	Real Sporting	Alicante
	Osterc 1'	Summary	Rubén (yellow card) (yellow-red card) 61'	Stadium: José Rico Pérez; Referee: Rubio Iniesta

17 January 1999 20	Sporting de Gijón	2–1	Barcelona B	Gijón
	Cobas 62'; Cheryshev 64'	Summary	Babangida 73'	Stadium: El Molinón; Referee: González Vázquez

24 January 1999 21	Albacete	0–0	Real Sporting	Albacete
		Report		Stadium: Carlos Belmonte; Referee: Undiano Mallenco

31 January 1999 22	Toledo	2–5	Real Sporting	Toledo
	Luis Manuel 53' (pen.); Jurado 58'	Summary	Sergio 24'; Cheryshev 64', 82'; Hadda 83'; Óscar 89' (pen.)	Stadium: Salto del Caballo; Referee: Pérez Pérez

7 February 1999 23	Real Sporting	3–1	Eibar	Gijón
	Óscar 24' (pen.); Cheryshev 25'; Lediakhov 74'	Summary	Bixente 38' (pen.); Quico (red card) 82'	Stadium: El Molinón; Referee: Campos Andreu

14 February 1999 24	Real Sporting	1–1	Málaga	Gijón
	Monchu 28'	Summary	Ruano 17' (yellow card) (yellow-red card) 43'	Stadium: El Molinón; Referee: López de la Fuente

20 February 1999 25	Las Palmas	3–0	Real Sporting	Las Palmas
	Renaldo 35'; Orlando 68'; Kowalczyk	Summary		Stadium: Insular; Referee: Román González

28 February 1999 26	Real Sporting	3–2	Mallorca B	Gijón
	Perović 4', 61'; Cheryshev 6' (yellow card) (yellow-red card) 49'; Sergio (yellow card) (yellow-red card) 89'	Summary	Tristán 44'; Ramón 65'	Stadium: El Molinón; Referee: González González

7 March 1999 27	Atlético Madrid B	1–0	Real Sporting	Majadahonda
	Fortune 55'	Summary	Urbano (yellow card) (yellow-red card) 55'	Stadium: Cerro del Espino; Referee: Ramírez Domínguez

14 March 1999 28	Real Sporting	0–0	Rayo Vallecano	Gijón
	Monchu (red card) 66'	Summary		Stadium: El Molinón; Referee: Navas Lasa

21 March 1999 29	Logroñés	0–2	Real Sporting	Logroño
	Mario 28'	Summary	Cheryshev 78' (yellow card) (yellow-red card) 80'	Stadium: Estadio Las Gaunas; Referee: Moreno Delgado

28 March 1999 30	Real Sporting	1–1	Lleida	Gijón
		Summary	Maqueda 42'	Stadium: El Molinón; Referee: Muñoz Juste

4 April 1999 31	Numancia	1–1	Real Sporting	Soria
	Javi Moreno 75'	Summary	Óscar 58' (pen.); Hadda (yellow card) (yellow-red card) 77'	Stadium: Los Pajaritos; Referee: Fernández Hinojosa

10 April 1999 32	Real Sporting	3–1	Compostela	Gijón
	José Manuel 49'; Perović 58'; Lediakhov 69' (yellow card) (yellow-red card) 75'	Summary	Fabiano 39'; Viedma (red card) 85'	Stadium: El Molinón; Referee: Montesinos Mariano

18 April 1999 33	Sevilla	2–0	Real Sporting	Seville
	Tsartas 57'; Juan Carlos 58'	Summary		Stadium: Ramón Sánchez Pizjuán; Referee: Pinar Martínez

25 April 1999 34	Real Sporting	1–0	Ourense	Gijón
	Perović 73'	Summary		Stadium: El Molinón; Referee: Llonch Andreu

2 May 1999 35	Recreativo Huelva	0–0	Real Sporting	Huelva
		Summary		Stadium: Colombino; Referee: González Vázquez

9 May 1999 36	Real Sporting	2–0	Mérida	Gijón
	Monchu 37'; Cheryshev 76'	Summary		Stadium: El Molinón; Referee: Eleicegui Uranga

16 May 1999 37	Leganés	0–1	Real Sporting	Leganés
		Summary	Cheryshev 50'; Óscar (red card) 68'	Stadium: Butarque; Referee: López de la Fuente

23 May 1999 38	Real Sporting	1–0	Badajoz	Gijón
	Cheryshev 71'	Summary		Stadium: El Molinón; Referee: Tristante Oliva

30 May 1999 39	Osasuna	0–4	Real Sporting	Pamplona
		Summary	Cheryshev 12', 72', 77'; Lediakhov 36'	Stadium: El Sadar; Referee: González González

6 June 1999 40	Real Sporting	2–0	Hércules	Gijón
	Monchu 55'; Lediakhov 89'	Summary		Stadium: El Molinón; Referee: Turienzo Álvarez

12 June 1999 41	Barcelona B	4–0	Real Sporting	Barcelona
	Mario Rosas 6'; Nano 9'; Gabri 19'; Babangida 37'	Summary		Stadium: Mini Estadi; Referee: Valle Gil

20 June 1999 42	Real Sporting	4–2	Albacete	Gijón
	Cheryshev 4'; Lediakhov 54'; Monchu 65'; Kaiku 83'	Summary	Dani Bouzas 11'; Jesús Muñoz 47'	Stadium: El Molinón; Referee: Román González

=== Copa del Rey ===
==== Matches ====
2 September 1998 First round First leg	Lealtad	2–1	Real Sporting	Villaviciosa
	Vigón 19'; Israel 33'	Report	Cheryshev 5'; Óscar (red card) 42'	Stadium: Las Callejas; Referee: Navas Lasa

9 September 1998 First round Second leg	Real Sporting	3–0 (4–2 agg.)	Lealtad	Gijón
	Cheryshev 11', 65'; Monchu (yellow card) (yellow-red card) 48'; Sergio (yellow card) (yellow-red card) 52'; Rubén 58'	Report	Israel (yellow card) (yellow-red card) 45'	Stadium: El Molinón; Referee: López de la Fuente

24 September 1998 Second round First leg	Ourense	0–0	Real Sporting	Ourense
		Report		Stadium: O Couto; Referee: Valle Gil

7 October 1998 Second round Second leg	Real Sporting	0–0 (0–0 agg.) (4–3 p)	Ourense	Gijón
	Urbano (yellow card) (yellow-red card) 97'	Report		Stadium: El Molinón; Referee: Navas Lasa

28 October 1998 Third round First leg	Real Sporting	1–1	Zaragoza	Gijón
	David Cano 77'	Report	Gustavo López 43'	Stadium: El Molinón; Referee: Brito Arceo

11 November 1998 Third round Second leg	Zaragoza	2–2 (3–3 agg.)	Real Sporting	Zaragoza
	Milošević 40'; Jamelli 70'	Report	Cheryshev 74'; Takis 91'	Stadium: La Romareda; Referee: Losantos Omar

16 December 1998 Fourth round First leg	Deportivo La Coruña	1–1	Real Sporting	A Coruña
	Donato 37' (pen.)	Report	Hadda 14'; Mario (yellow card) (yellow-red card) 45'	Stadium: Riazor; Referee: Japón Sevilla

13 January 1999 Fourth round Second leg	Real Sporting	0–1 (1–2 agg.)	Deportivo La Coruña	Gijón
		Report	Donato 81'	Stadium: El Molinón; Referee: Iturralde González

== Squad statistics ==
=== Appearances and goals ===
No.	Pos	Nat	Player	Total		Segunda División		Copa del Rey	
No.	Pos	Nat	Player	Apps	Goals	Apps	Goals	Apps	Goals
1	GK	(Spain) ESP	Juan Carlos Ablanedo	3	0	2+0	0	1+0	0
2	DF	(Spain) ESP	Iván Otero	16	0	10+3	0	2+1	0
3	DF	(Spain) ESP	Mingo	40	0	36+0	0	4+0	0
4	DF	(Spain) ESP	Rubén Darío Acebal	4	0	2+0	0	2+0	0
5	DF	(Spain) ESP	José Jesús Mesas	36	0	28+4	0	4+0	0
6	MF	(Spain) ESP	Vicente	27	0	17+7	0	2+1	0
7	MF	(Spain) ESP	Mario	36	3	23+7	3	4+2	0
8	MF	(Spain) ESP	David Cano	20	1	10+4	0	4+2	1
9	FW	(Morocco) MAR	Abdeljalil Hadda	27	5	13+10	4	2+2	1
10	MF	(Greece) GRE	Takis Gonias	15	2	6+5	1	3+1	1
11	MF	(Spain) ESP	José Manuel	28	1	23+1	1	3+1	0
12	MF	(Federal Republic of Yugoslavia) YUG	Marko Perović	17	4	6+11	4	0+0	0
13	GK	(Spain) ESP	Sergio Sánchez	32	0	25+1	0	6+0	0
14	MF	(Spain) ESP	Fredi	8	0	2+6	0	0+0	0
15	MF	(Russia) RUS	Igor Lediakhov	20	5	20+0	5	0+0	0
16	DF	(Bolivia) BOL	Luis Cristaldo	13	1	7+1	1	3+2	0
17	FW	(Spain) ESP	Monchu	40	5	28+6	5	5+1	0
18	MF	(Spain) ESP	Óscar Arias	38	3	29+2	3	7+0	0
19	FW	(Spain) ESP	Kaiku	14	1	1+8	1	1+4	0
20	DF	(Spain) ESP	Isma	19	1	13+3	1	3+0	0
21	DF	(Spain) ESP	Sergio	31	1	28+0	1	3+0	0
22	MF	(Spain) ESP	Manolo	5	0	3+1	0	1+0	0
23	MF	(Spain) ESP	Antonio Poyatos	17	0	4+10	0	3+0	0
24	FW	(Russia) RUS	Dmitri Cheryshev	43	17	30+6	13	7+0	4
25	GK	(Spain) ESP	Juanjo	16	0	15+0	0	1+0	0
26	DF	(Spain) ESP	Urbano	25	0	15+5	0	5+0	0
27	MF	(Spain) ESP	Miguel Cobas	10	1	8+0	1	2+0	0
28	DF	(Spain) ESP	Yago	9	0	5+0	0	4+0	0
29	FW	(Spain) ESP	Rubén Suárez	30	2	15+11	1	3+1	1
30	FW	(Spain) ESP	Salvador Capín	20	0	16+0	0	3+1	0
31	DF	(Spain) ESP	Borja Sánchez	2	0	1+0	0	0+1	0
32	DF	(Spain) ESP	Nacho García	7	1	3+3	1	0+1	0
36	MF	(Spain) ESP	Sergio Lara	7	0	6+1	0	0+0	0
37	FW	(Spain) ESP	Miguel	5	1	2+3	1	0+0	0
38	FW	(Spain) ESP	Alberto	11	0	10+1	0	0+0	0
