= 1999–2000 Sporting de Gijón season =

Real Sporting
1999–2000 season
- Chairman: Juan Manuel Pérez Arango
- Manager: Ciriaco Cano
- Stadium: El Molinón
- Segunda División: 9th
- Copa del Rey: Second round
- Top goalscorer: Dmitri Cheryshev (13)
- Average home league attendance: 11,757

The 1999–2000 Sporting de Gijón season was the second consecutive season of the club in Segunda División after its last relegation from La Liga.

== Overview ==
After the 33rd round, Pedro Braojos was sacked and Ciriaco Cano, former player of the club, replaced him at the helm of the first squad.

== Squad ==
Note: Flags indicate national team as defined under FIFA eligibility rules; some limited exceptions apply. Players may hold more than one non-FIFA nationality.

No.	Pos.	Nation	Player
1	GK	ESP	Juanjo
2	DF	ESP	Urbano
3	DF	ESP	Mingo
4	DF	ESP	Isma
5	DF	ESP	José Jesús Mesas
6	MF	YUG	Marko Perović
7	MF	ESP	Mario
8	MF	ESP	David Cano
9	FW	ESP	Francisco Jurado
10	MF	RUS	Igor Lediakhov
11	MF	ESP	Gustavo Cañizares
12	DF	ESP	Francesc Sànchez Jara
13	GK	ESP	Sergio Sánchez

No.	Pos.	Nation	Player
15	MF	ESP	Aitor
16	FW	MAR	Abdeljalil Hadda
17	FW	ESP	Monchu
18	MF	ESP	Óscar Arias
19	FW	ESP	Luna
20	FW	ESP	Nacho García
20	DF	ESP	Pablo Amo
21	DF	ESP	Vicente
22	MF	ESP	Manolo
23	MF	ESP	Miguel Cobas
24	FW	RUS	Dmitri Cheryshev
25	GK	ESP	Juanjo Valencia
25	DF	ESP	Yago

=== From the youth squad ===
Note: Flags indicate national team as defined under FIFA eligibility rules; some limited exceptions apply. Players may hold more than one non-FIFA nationality.

No.	Pos.	Nation	Player
26	MF	ESP	Sergio Lara
27	MF	ESP	Salvador Capín
28	MF	ESP	Alberto
29	FW	ESP	Rubén Suárez
30	MF	ESP	Raúl Lozano
31	GK	ESP	Bruno

No.	Pos.	Nation	Player
32	MF	ESP	Óscar Fernández
33	DF	ESP	Borja Sánchez
34	MF	ESP	Samuel
36	DF	VEN	Álex Pereira
37	FW	ESP	Miguel

== Competitions ==
=== La Liga ===
==== Results by round ====
Round	1	2	3	4	5	6	7	8	9	10	11	12	13	14	15	16	17	18	19	20	21	22	23	24	25	26	27	28	29	30	31	32	33	34	35	36	37	38	39	40	41	42
Ground	A	H	A	H	A	H	A	H	A	H	A	H	A	H	H	A	H	A	H	A	H	H	A	H	A	H	A	H	A	H	A	H	A	H	A	A	H	A	H	A	H	A
Result	W	L	W	W	L	L	L	W	D	L	W	W	L	W	W	D	L	W	W	L	D	W	D	L	L	W	W	D	L	D	L	L	W	W	D	W	L	L	W	L	D	D
Position	7	11	7	5	8	11	12	9	9	13	9	5	10	5	5	5	6	5	4	5	5	4	5	6	7	6	5	4	6	7	10	10	10	7	7	5	7	7	6	8	9	9

Source: BDFutbol
A = Away; H = Home; W = Win; D = Draw; L = Loss

==== League table ====
Pos	Team	Pld	W	D	L	GF	GA	GD	Pts
7	Levante	42	16	13	13	55	52	+3	61
8	Extremadura	42	16	13	13	49	47	+2	61
9	Sporting Gijón	42	17	9	16	54	48	+6	60
10	Albacete	42	15	14	13	51	53	−2	59
11	Eibar	42	14	15	13	48	49	−1	57

Rules for classification: 1st points; 2nd head-to-head points; 3rd head-to-head goal difference; 4th head-to-head goals scored; 5th goal difference; 6th number of goals scored; 7th Fair-play points

==== Matches ====
22 August 1999 1	Córdoba	0–1	Real Sporting	Córdoba
		Summary	Lediakhov 44'	Stadium: Nuevo Arcángel; Referee: González Vázquez

29 August 1999 2	Real Sporting	1–2	Las Palmas	Gijón
	Cheryshev 25'; Mesas (yellow card) 84'	Summary	Tevenet 35' (pen.); Eloy Jiménez 85'	Stadium: El Molinón; Referee: Pérez Izquierdo

5 September 1999 3	Logroñés	2–3	Real Sporting	Logroño
	Manel 28'; Pepelu 85'	Summary	Cheryshev 53', 74'; Urbano 78'	Stadium: Las Gaunas; Referee: Rodríguez Martel

12 September 1999 4	Real Sporting	2–1	Lleida	Gijón
	Cheryshev 82'; Mario 87'	Summary	Javi Peña 9'	Stadium: El Molinón; Referee: Barea López

18 September 1999 5	Salamanca	3–2	Real Sporting	Villares de la Reina
	Quique Martín 7', 21'; Urbano 35'	Summary	Manolo 52'; Óscar 80'	Stadium: El Helmántico; Referee: López de la Fuente

26 September 1999 6	Real Sporting	1–2	Albacete	Gijón
	Isma 60'	Report	Sala 44' (pen.); Sabas 75'	Stadium: El Molinón; Referee: Moreno Delgado

3 October 1999 7	Badajoz	2–1	Real Sporting	Badajoz
	Carlos Torres 82'; Bracamonte 89'	Summary	Óscar 77'; Sergio Sánchez (yellow card) (yellow-red card) 77'	Stadium: Nuevo Vivero; Referee: Muñoz Juste

9 October 1999 8	Real Sporting	1–0	Getafe	Gijón
	Lediakhov 29' (pen.)	Summary	Juanma (red card) 77'	Stadium: El Molinón; Referee: Navas Lasa

13 October 1999 9	Eibar	1–1	Real Sporting	Eibar
	Olano 27'	Report	Lediakhov 35'	Stadium: Ipurua; Referee: González González

29 October 1999 10	Real Sporting	0–2	Elche	Gijón
		Report	Guede 27'; Edu García 66' (pen.)	Stadium: El Molinón; Referee: González Vázquez

24 October 1999 11	Villarreal	1–2	Real Sporting	Villarreal
	Moisés 39'; Imanol (yellow card) (yellow-red card) 55'	Report	Mario 16'; Cheryshev 28'	Stadium: El Madrigal; Referee: Fernández Hinojosa

31 October 1999 12	Real Sporting	4–0	Levante	Gijón
	Jurado 21'; Cheryshev 30', 83' (pen.); Manolo 89'	Summary	Veiga (red card) 80'	Stadium: El Molinón; Referee: Román González

7 November 1999 13	Tenerife	2–1	Real Sporting	Valencia
	Ballesteros (red card) 42'; Barata 47', 58'	Report	Cheryshev (red card) 42'; Isma (yellow card) (yellow-red card) 42'; Jurado 81'	Stadium: Ciutat de València; Referee: Campos Andreu

14 November 1999 14	Real Sporting	1–0	Extremadura	Gijón
	Lediakhov 37'	Report		Stadium: El Molinón; Referee: Ramírez Domínguez

21 November 1999 15	Real Sporting	3–1	Recreativo	Gijón
	Lediakhov 32' (pen.), 67'; Jurado 44'; Perović (yellow card) (yellow-red card) 90'	Summary	Bodipo 3'	Stadium: El Molinón; Referee: Tristante Oliva

28 November 1999 16	Toledo	0–0	Real Sporting	Toledo
		Summary	Sànchez Jara (yellow card) (yellow-red card) 68'	Stadium: Salto del Caballo; Referee: Undiano Mallenco

5 December 1999 17	Real Sporting	1–2	Mérida	Gijón
	Mario (yellow card) (yellow-red card) 58'; Manolo 76'	Summary	Alfaro (yellow card) (yellow-red card) 54'; Tal 51'; Sena 85'	Stadium: El Molinón; Referee: Muñoz Juste

11 December 1999 18	Atlético Madrid B	0–1	Real Sporting	Majadahonda
		Summary	Alberto 55'	Stadium: Cerro del Espino; Referee: Valle Gil

19 December 1999 19	Real Sporting	3–0	Leganés	Gijón
	Jurado 15'; Lediakhov 19' (pen.); Manolo 48'	Report		Stadium: El Molinón; Referee: González González

4 January 2000 20	Osasuna	1–0	Real Sporting	Pamplona
	Cruchaga 58'	Report		Stadium: El Sadar; Referee: Teixeira Vitienes

9 January 2000 21	Sporting de Gijón	1–1	Compostela	Gijón
	Francisco 77'	Summary	Villena 19'; André Luiz (yellow card) (yellow-red card) 67'; Bellido (yellow card) (yellow-red card) 81'; Ponk (yellow card) (yellow-red card) 89'	Stadium: El Molinón; Referee: Pino Zamorano

16 January 2000 22	Real Sporting	1–0	Córdoba	Gijón
	Alberto (red card) 88'; Óscar Ventaja 89' (o.g.)	Summary	Mandiá (yellow card) (yellow-red card) 55'	Stadium: El Molinón; Referee: Campos Andreu

22 January 2000 23	Las Palmas	1–1	Real Sporting	Las Palmas
	Josico 41'	Summary	Aitor 78'	Stadium: Insular; Referee: Eleicegui Uranga

30 January 2000 24	Real Sporting	1–4	Logroñés	Gijón
	Isma (red card) 38'; Mingo 47'; Juanjo (red card) 73'	Summary	Quico 39'; Borja 58'; Molist 85', 89'	Stadium: El Molinón; Referee: González González

6 February 2000 25	Lleida	4–1	Real Sporting	Lleida
	Fran 31'; Setvalls 51', 65'; Roa 85'	Summary	Lozano 9'; Mario (yellow card) (yellow-red card) 50'	Stadium: Camp d'Esports; Referee: Ramírez Domínguez

13 February 2000 26	Real Sporting	2–0	Salamanca	Gijón
	Lediakhov 30' (pen.); Jurado 89'	Summary		Stadium: El Molinón; Referee: Rubio Iniesta

20 February 2000 27	Albacete	1–2	Real Sporting	Albacete
	Corona (yellow card) (yellow-red card) 42'; Basti 50'; Aitor Ocio (yellow card) (yellow-red card) 84'	Summary	Lediakhov 5' (pen.) (red card) 57'; Mingo 67'	Stadium: Carlos Belmonte; Referee: Téllez Sánchez

26 February 2000 28	Real Sporting	0–0	Badajoz	Gijón
		Summary		Stadium: El Molinón; Referee: Pérez Pérez

5 March 2000 29	Getafe	1–0	Real Sporting	Getafe
	Hugo 59' (red card) 82'	Summary		Stadium: Coliseum Alfonso Pérez; Referee: Rodríguez Martel

12 March 2000 30	Real Sporting	1–1	Eibar	Gijón
	Cheryshev 65' (pen.)	Summary	Irazoki 20'; Jon Ander (red card) 63'	Stadium: El Molinón; Referee: Román González

19 March 2000 31	Elche	2–1	Real Sporting	Elche
	Mingo 34' (o.g.); Armentano 89'	Summary	Cheryshev 5'	Stadium: Manuel Martínez Valero; Referee: Amilburu Santamaría

26 March 2000 32	Real Sporting	1–2	Villarreal	Gijón
	Cheryshev 78'	Summary	Jorge López 47'; Moisés 74'	Stadium: El Molinón; Referee: González González

15 April 2000 33	Levante	0–2	Real Sporting	Valencia
		Summary	Cheryshev 6'; Alberto 17'	Stadium: Ciudad de Valencia; Referee: Barea López

22 April 2000 34	Real Sporting	2–0	Tenerife	Gijón
	Cheryshev 24'; Lediakhov 36'	Summary	André Luiz (red card) 82'	Stadium: El Molinón; Referee: Eleicegui Uranga

16 April 2000 35	Extremadura	2–2	Real Sporting	Almendralejo
	Duré 11'; Mosquera 28'	Summary	Lediakhov 47', 70'	Stadium: Francisco de la Hera; Referee: Téllez Sánchez

23 April 2000 36	Recreativo	0–1	Real Sporting	Huelva
		Summary	Monchu 71'	Stadium: Colombino; Referee: Undiano Mallenco

7 May 2000 37	Real Sporting	0–1	Toledo	Gijón
		Summary	Luis García 73'	Stadium: El Molinón; Referee: Fernández Hinojosa

7 May 2000 38	Mérida	1–0	Real Sporting	Mérida
	David 44'	Summary		Stadium: Romano; Referee: Teixeira Vitienes

14 May 2000 39	Real Sporting	3–1	Atlético Madrid B	Gijón
	Alberto 33'; Rubén 55'; Cheryshev 92'	Summary	Óscar Sánchez 66'	Stadium: El Molinón; Referee: Rodríguez Martel

21 May 2000 40	Leganés	2–1	Real Sporting	Leganés
	Barbarín 73', 86'	Summary	Rubén 82'	Stadium: Butarque; Referee: Valle Gil

28 May 2000 41	Real Sporting	1–1	Osasuna	Gijón
	Mario (yellow card) (yellow-red card) 17'; Jurado 85'	Summary	Iván Rosado 87'	Stadium: El Molinón; Referee: López de la Fuente

4 June 2000 42	Compostela	1–1	Real Sporting	Gijón
	Sion 28'	Summary	David Cano 78'	Stadium: El Molinón; Referee: Román González

=== Copa del Rey ===
==== Matches ====
10 November 1999 First round First leg	Gimnástica Segoviana	0–0	Real Sporting	Segovia
		Report		Stadium: La Albuera; Referee: Rubio Iniesta

1 December 1999 First round Second leg	Real Sporting	2–1 (2–1 agg.)	Gimnástica Segoviana	Gijón
	Luna 68'; Mingo 86'	Report	Luengo 51'	Stadium: El Molinón; Referee: Amilburu Santamaría

15 December 1999 Second round First leg	Real Sporting	0–3	Celta	Gijón
		Report	Djorović 12'; Revivo 24'; McCarthy 67'	Stadium: El Molinón; Referee: Rodríguez Santiago

12 January 2000 Second round Second leg	Celta	4–2 (7–2 agg.)	Real Sporting	Vigo
	Sànchez Jara 12' (o.g.); Djorović 53'; McCarthy 73'; Turdó 89'	Report	Luna 26'; Nacho García 84'	Stadium: Balaídos; Referee: Carmona Méndez

== Squad statistics ==
=== Appearances and goals ===
No.	Pos	Nat	Player	Total		Segunda División		Copa del Rey	
No.	Pos	Nat	Player	Apps	Goals	Apps	Goals	Apps	Goals
1	GK	(Spain) ESP	Juanjo	25	0	20+1	0	4+0	0
2	DF	(Spain) ESP	Urbano	14	1	11+1	1	1+1	0
3	DF	(Spain) ESP	Mingo	42	3	40+0	2	2+0	1
4	DF	(Spain) ESP	Isma	30	1	25+2	1	3+0	0
5	DF	(Spain) ESP	José Jesús Mesas	16	0	12+3	0	1+0	0
6	MF	(Federal Republic of Yugoslavia) YUG	Marko Perović	13	0	1+11	0	1+0	0
7	MF	(Spain) ESP	Mario	36	2	28+5	2	3+0	0
8	MF	(Spain) ESP	David Cano	27	1	27+0	1	0+0	0
9	FW	(Spain) ESP	Francisco Jurado	33	7	15+15	7	3+0	0
10	MF	(Russia) RUS	Igor Lediakhov	31	12	29+0	12	2+0	0
11	MF	(Spain) ESP	Gustavo Cañizares	20	0	5+13	0	2+0	0
12	DF	(Spain) ESP	Francesc Sànchez Jara	30	0	25+2	0	3+0	0
13	GK	(Spain) ESP	Sergio Sánchez	10	0	10+0	0	0+0	0
14	GK	(Spain) ESP	Juan José Valencia	9	0	9+0	0	0+0	0
15	MF	(Spain) ESP	Aitor	20	1	9+7	1	4+0	0
16	FW	(Morocco) MAR	Abdeljalil Hadda	3	0	0+3	0	0+0	0
17	FW	(Spain) ESP	Monchu	11	1	8+3	1	0+0	0
18	MF	(Spain) ESP	Óscar Arias	30	2	24+4	2	2+0	0
19	FW	(Spain) ESP	Luna	13	2	5+5	0	2+1	2
20	DF	(Spain) ESP	Nacho García	4	1	1+1	0	0+2	1
20	DF	(Spain) ESP	Pablo Amo	11	0	6+5	0	0+0	0
21	MF	(Spain) ESP	Vicente	9	0	8+1	0	0+0	0
22	MF	(Spain) ESP	Manolo	36	4	33+1	4	0+2	0
23	MF	(Spain) ESP	Miguel Cobas	15	0	6+7	0	1+1	0
24	FW	(Russia) RUS	Dmitri Cheryshev	32	13	27+3	13	1+1	0
25	DF	(Spain) ESP	Yago	36	0	29+3	0	4+0	0
26	MF	(Spain) ESP	Sergio Lara	1	0	1+0	0	0+0	0
27	FW	(Spain) ESP	Salvador Capín	13	0	8+5	0	0+0	0
28	FW	(Spain) ESP	Alberto	27	3	19+6	3	1+1	0
29	FW	(Spain) ESP	Rubén Suárez	5	2	4+1	2	0+0	0
30	MF	(Spain) ESP	Raúl Lozano	12	1	7+3	1	1+1	0
31	GK	(Spain) ESP	Bruno	5	0	3+2	0	0+0	0
32	MF	(Spain) ESP	Óscar	4	0	1+1	0	1+1	0
33	DF	(Spain) ESP	Borja Sánchez	4	0	1+0	0	2+1	0
34	MF	(Spain) ESP	Samuel	3	0	3+0	0	0+0	0
36	DF	(Venezuela) VEN	Álex Pereira	3	0	2+1	0	0+0	0
37	FW	(Spain) ESP	Miguel	5	0	0+5	0	0+0	0
