= 1997–98 Sporting de Gijón season =

Real Sporting
1997–98 season
- Chairman: Ángel García Flórez
- Manager: José Antonio Redondo
- Stadium: El Molinón
- La Liga: 20th
- Copa del Rey: Second round
- Top goalscorer: Dmitri Cheryshev (6)
- Average home league attendance: 15,382

The 1997–98 Sporting de Gijón season was the 36th season of the club in La Liga, the 22nd consecutive after its last promotion. The club ended the season as 20th qualified with only 13 points.

== Overview ==
After avoiding the relegation in the previous season, Miguel Montes continued at the helm of the team, but he was quickly sacked after the first four rounds, where Real Sporting did not win any point, scored only three goals and received 14 against.

Antonio Maceda replaced him, but he was sacked after the 15th round, earning only two points in nine games. Maceda was replaced by José Manuel Díaz Novoa. Novoa achieved the first win in the league, ending with 23 rounds without winning any game, the worst streak in the history of La Liga. He resigned after the 31st round, being substituted by José Antonio Redondo, who only could win another game in his first match as head coach.

Real Sporting was relegated in March and ended the season with the lowest points in the history of the La Liga.

After the end of the season, the Player of the Season award was given to the supporters.

== Squad ==
Note: Flags indicate national team as defined under FIFA eligibility rules; some limited exceptions apply. Players may hold more than one non-FIFA nationality.

No.	Pos.	Nation	Player
1	GK	ESP	Juan Carlos Ablanedo
2	DF	ARG	Roberto Trotta
3	DF	RUS	Yuri Nikiforov
4	DF	ESP	Sergio
5	DF	ESP	Rubén Darío Acebal
6	MF	ESP	Ricardo Bango
8	MF	ESP	Tomás
9	FW	POL	Cezary Kucharski
9	FW	YUG	Vladimir Popović
10	MF	RUS	Igor Lediakhov
11	MF	ESP	José Manuel
12	MF	RUS	Alexei Kosolapov
13	GK	YUG	Dragoje Leković

No.	Pos.	Nation	Player
14	MF	ESP	Fredi
14	MF	BRA	Rodrigão
15	FW	RUS	Dmitri Cheryshev
16	FW	ESP	Kaiku
17	DF	ESP	Pablo
19	FW	ESP	Luna
20	DF	ESP	Francisco Villarroya
21	DF	ESP	Jesús Enrique Velasco
22	MF	ESP	David Cano
23	MF	ESP	Antonio Poyatos
24	MF	ESP	Álex
25	GK	ESP	Juanjo
28	DF	ESP	Mingo

=== From the youth squad ===
Note: Flags indicate national team as defined under FIFA eligibility rules; some limited exceptions apply. Players may hold more than one non-FIFA nationality.

No.	Pos.	Nation	Player
27	MF	ESP	Mario
29	DF	ESP	Isma
30	MF	ESP	Salvador Capín
31	MF	ESP	Manolo

No.	Pos.	Nation	Player
32	MF	ESP	Óscar Fernández
34	DF	ESP	Iván Otero
35	MF	ESP	Alberto
36	FW	ESP	Miguel

== Competitions ==
=== La Liga ===
==== Results by round ====
Round	1	2	3	4	5	6	7	8	9	10	11	12	13	14	15	16	17	18	19	20	21	22	23	24	25	26	27	28	29	30	31	32	33	34	35	36	37	38
Ground	A	H	A	H	A	H	A	H	A	H	A	H	A	H	A	H	A	H	A	H	A	H	A	H	A	H	A	H	A	H	A	H	A	H	A	H	A	H
Result	L	L	L	L	L	L	D	L	L	L	L	L	D	L	L	D	L	L	L	L	L	L	L	W	L	L	D	L	L	D	D	W	L	L	L	L	D	L
Position	19	19	20	19	19	20	20	20	20	20	20	20	20	20	20	20	20	20	20	20	20	20	20	20	20	20	20	20	20	20	20	20	20	20	20	20	20	20

Source: BDFutbol
A = Away; H = Home; W = Win; D = Draw; L = Loss

==== League table ====
Pos	Team	Pld	W	D	L	GF	GA	GD	Pts	Qualification or relegation
16	Tenerife	38	11	12	15	44	57	−13	45 (Note: RAC: 8 pts; SAL: 4 pts → SAL 2-0 TEN; TEN: 4 pts → TEN 2-0 SAL)	
17	Compostela (R)	38	11	11	16	56	66	−10	44	Qualification for the relegation playoffs
18	Oviedo (O)	38	9	13	16	36	51	−15	40	Qualification for the relegation playoffs
19	Mérida (R)	38	9	12	17	33	53	−20	39	Relegation to the Segunda División
20	Sporting Gijón (R)	38	2	7	29	31	80	−49	13	Relegation to the Segunda División

Source: LFP
Rules for classification: 1) points; 2) head-to-head points; 3) head-to-head goal difference; 4) head-to-head goals scored; 5) goal difference; 6) number of goals scored.
(O) Play-off winners; (R) Relegated

==== Matches ====
31 August 1997 1	Compostela	2–0	Real Sporting	Santiago de Compostela
	Penev 68'; Sion 84'	Summary		Stadium: San Lázaro; Referee: López Nieto

7 September 1997 2	Real Sporting	0–2	Tenerife	Gijón
		Summary	Pinilla 5'; Chano 53'	Stadium: El Molinón; Referee: Ansuategui Roca

15 September 1997 3	Mallorca	6–2	Real Sporting	Palma
	Mena 20'; Moya 44'; Amato 47'; Monchu 79', 84'; Villarroya 82' (o.g.)	Summary	Kosolapov 14'; Kucharski 74'	Stadium: Lluís Sitjar; Referee: Esquinas Torres

27 September 1997 4	Real Sporting	1–4	Barcelona	Gijón
	Bango 30'	Summary	Luis Enrique 2', 73'; Rivaldo 8', 82'	Stadium: El Molinón; Referee: Rodríguez Martel

5 October 1997 5	Racing Santander	4–1	Real Sporting	Santander
	Correa 7', 25', 85'; Schürrer (red card) 47'; Beschastnykh 75'	Summary	Cheryshev 82'	Stadium: El Sardinero; Referee: Puentes Leira

15 October 1997 6	Real Sporting	0–2	Real Madrid	Gijón
		Report	Morientes 18'; Raúl 76'	Stadium: El Molinón; Referee: López de la Fuente

18 October 1997 7	Valladolid	1–1	Real Sporting	Valladolid
	Júlio César 89'	Summary	Lediakhov 77' (pen.)	Stadium: José Zorrilla; Referee: Iturralde González

26 October 1997 8	Real Sporting	1–2	Athletic Bilbao	Gijón
	Lediakhov 61' (pen.)	Summary	Larrazábal 41' (pen.); Carlos García 54'	Stadium: El Molinón; Referee: Carmona Méndez

2 November 1997 9	Celta	1–0	Real Sporting	Vigo
	Cadete 56'	Report		Stadium: Balaídos; Referee: Pérez Lasa

9 November 1997 10	Real Sporting	1–2	Oviedo	Gijón
	Bango 10'	Report	Juan González 18'; Dely Valdés 53'	Stadium: El Molinón; Referee: Andradas Asurmendi

12 November 1997 11	Mérida	1–0	Real Sporting	Mérida
	Sabas 83'	Report		Stadium: Romano José Fouto; Referee: Japón Sevilla

16 November 1997 12	Real Sporting	2–3	Zaragoza	Gijón
	Isma (yellow card) (yellow-red card) 77'; Luna 88'; Tomás 89'	Summary	Aragón 20', 50'; Yordi 22'	Stadium: El Molinón; Referee: Losantos Omar

24 November 1997 13	Espanyol	1–1	Real Sporting	Barcelona
	Quique Martín 16'	Report	Cheryshev 68'; Mario (red card) 84'	Stadium: Montjuïc; Referee: García Aranda

29 November 1997 14	Real Sporting	2–3	Real Betis	Gijón
	Lediakhov 32'; Trotta 40'	Report	Oli 12'; Alfonso 35', 69' (red card) 86'	Stadium: El Molinón; Referee: Pino Zamorano

6 December 1997 15	Atlético Madrid	2–1	Real Sporting	Madrid
	Bogdanović 56'; Geli 72'	Summary	Luna 85'	Stadium: Vicente Calderón; Referee: Ansuategui Roca

14 December 1997 16	Real Sporting	1–1	Salamanca	Gijón
	Kucharski 44'	Summary	Pauleta 4'	Stadium: El Molinón; Referee: Prados García

17 December 1997 17	Real Sociedad	2–1	Real Sporting	San Sebastián
	Craioveanu 51'; Kovačević 82' (pen.)	Summary	Luna 64'; Ablanedo (red card) 89'	Stadium: Anoeta; Referee: Fernández Marín

21 December 1997 18	Real Sporting	0–3	Valencia	Gijón
		Report	Farinós 9'; Claudio López 42', 66'	Stadium: El Molinón; Referee: López Nieto

4 January 1998 19	Deportivo La Coruña	2–1	Real Sporting	A Coruña
	Songo'o (red card) 2'; Naybet 70'; Abreu 85'	Summary	Álex 24'	Stadium: Riazor; Referee: Daudén Ibáñez

11 January 1998 20	Sporting de Gijón	0–2	Compostela	Gijón
		Summary	Popov 51'; Ohen 55'	Stadium: El Molinón; Referee: López Nieto

18 January 1998 21	Tenerife	2–1	Real Sporting	Santa Cruz de Tenerife
	Paciência 62'; Roy Makaay 82'	Report	Sergio (yellow card) (yellow-red card) 76'; David Cano 87'	Stadium: Heliodoro Rodríguez López; Referee: Carmona Méndez

25 January 1998 22	Real Sporting	1–3	Mallorca	Gijón
	Lediakhov 6' (pen.)	Summary	Amato 2'; Gálvez 26'; Valerón 77'	Stadium: El Molinón; Referee: Esquinas Torres

1 February 1998 23	Barcelona	2–1	Real Sporting	Barcelona
	Rivaldo 18', 37'	Summary	Cheryshev 35'	Stadium: Camp Nou; Referee: Pérez Lasa

8 February 1998 24	Real Sporting	2–1	Racing Santander	Gijón
	Rodrigão 22'; Tomás 25'	Summary	Alberto 46'	Stadium: El Molinón; Referee: Losantos Omar

15 February 1998 25	Real Madrid	3–0	Real Sporting	Madrid
	Sávio 51'; Šuker 56', 61' (pen.)	Summary		Stadium: Santiago Bernabéu; Referee: Prados García

21 February 1998 26	Real Sporting	1–2	Valladolid	Gijón
	Trotta 89'	Summary	Chema 15'; Peternac 25'	Stadium: El Molinón; Referee: Rodríguez Martel

1 March 1998 27	Athletic Bilbao	2–2	Real Sporting	Bilbao
	Urzaiz 62', 89'	Summary	Tomás 11' (pen.); Cheryshev 21'	Stadium: San Mamés; Referee: López de la Fuente

8 March 1998 28	Real Sporting	0–1	Celta	Gijón
		Summary	Moisés 72'	Stadium: El Molinón; Referee: Pérez Burrull

15 March 1998 29	Oviedo	2–1	Real Sporting	Oviedo
	Nikiforov 16' (o.g.); Dely Valdés 81'	Summary	Kaiku 8'	Stadium: Carlos Tartiere; Referee: Andradas Asurmendi

22 March 1998 30	Real Sporting	0–0	Mérida	Gijón
		Summary		Stadium: El Molinón; Referee: Puentes Leira

29 March 1998 31	Zaragoza	0–0	Real Sporting	Zaragoza
	Gilmar (yellow card) (yellow-red card) 34'	Summary		Stadium: La Romareda; Referee: López Nieto

5 April 1998 32	Real Sporting	1–0	Espanyol	Gijón
	Cheryshev 66'	Summary		Stadium: El Molinón; Referee: García Aranda

13 April 1998 33	Real Betis	2–1	Real Sporting	Seville
	Oli 10', 43'	Summary	Cheryshev 58'	Stadium: Benito Villamarín; Referee: Esquinas Torres

19 April 1998 34	Real Sporting	2–3	Atlético Madrid	Gijón
	David Cano 42'; Trotta 44'	Summary	Paunović 56', 70'; Vieri 64'	Stadium: El Molinón; Referee: Ansuategui Roca

26 April 1998 35	Salamanca	4–0	Real Sporting	Villares de la Reina
	Loren 55'; Pauleta 60', 65'; Manolo 83' (o.g.)	Summary		Stadium: Helmántico; Referee: Iturralde González

3 May 1998 36	Real Sporting	0–2	Real Sociedad	Gijón
		Summary	Cvitanović 19'; Aldeondo 89'	Stadium: El Molinón; Referee: Megía Dávila

9 May 1998 37	Valencia	2–2	Real Sporting	Valencia
	Ilie 26'; Claudio López 70' (red card) 86'	Summary	Miguel 39'; David Cano 41'	Stadium: Mestalla; Referee: Gracia Redondo

16 May 1998 38	Real Sporting	0–3	Deportivo La Coruña	Gijón
		Summary	Bassir 5', 55'; Naybet (red card) 61'; Flávio Conceição 89'	Stadium: El Molinón; Referee: Carmona Méndez

=== Copa del Rey ===
==== Matches ====
8 October 1997 Second round First leg	Osasuna	1–1	Real Sporting	Pamplona
	Mateo 47'	Report	Cheryshev 39'	Stadium: El Sadar; Referee: Japón Sevilla

29 October 1997 Second round Second leg	Real Sporting	0–1 (1–2 agg.)	Osasuna	Gijón
		Report	Cruchaga 63'	Stadium: El Molinón; Referee: Brito Arceo

== Squad statistics ==
=== Appearances and goals ===
No.	Pos	Nat	Player	Total		La Liga		Copa del Rey	
No.	Pos	Nat	Player	Apps	Goals	Apps	Goals	Apps	Goals
1	GK	(Spain) ESP	Juan Carlos Ablanedo	23	0	21+0	0	2+0	0
2	DF	(Argentina) ARG	Roberto Trotta	18	3	17+1	3	0+0	0
3	DF	(Russia) RUS	Yuri Nikiforov	27	0	27+0	0	0+0	0
4	DF	(Spain) ESP	Sergio	27	0	23+2	0	2+0	0
5	DF	(Spain) ESP	Rubén Darío Acebal	12	0	9+1	0	2+0	0
6	MF	(Spain) ESP	Ricardo Bango	19	2	9+8	2	2+0	0
8	MF	(Spain) ESP	Tomás	33	3	23+8	3	0+2	0
9	FW	(Poland) POL	Cezary Kucharski	13	2	3+9	2	1+0	0
9	MF	(Federal Republic of Yugoslavia) YUG	Vladimir Popović	11	0	2+9	0	0+0	0
10	MF	(Russia) RUS	Igor Lediakhov	19	4	15+2	4	2+0	0
11	MF	(Spain) ESP	José Manuel	29	0	23+4	0	1+1	0
12	MF	(Russia) RUS	Alexei Kosolapov	6	1	4+2	1	0+0	0
13	GK	(Federal Republic of Yugoslavia) YUG	Dragoje Leković	5	0	5+0	0	0+0	0
14	MF	(Spain) ESP	Fredi	1	0	0+1	0	0+0	0
14	MF	(Brazil) BRA	Rodrigão	8	1	6+2	1	0+0	0
15	FW	(Russia) RUS	Dmitri Cheryshev	29	7	21+6	6	2+0	1
16	FW	(Spain) ESP	Kaiku	22	1	14+7	1	0+1	0
17	DF	(Spain) ESP	Pablo	19	0	16+2	0	1+0	0
19	FW	(Spain) ESP	Luna	12	3	5+7	3	0+0	0
20	DF	(Spain) ESP	Francisco Villarroya	14	0	10+3	0	1+0	0
21	DF	(Spain) ESP	Jesús Enrique Velasco	14	0	10+3	0	0+1	0
22	MF	(Spain) ESP	David Cano	23	3	16+6	3	1+0	0
23	MF	(Spain) ESP	Antonio Poyatos	26	0	22+3	0	1+0	0
24	MF	(Spain) ESP	Álex	27	1	18+8	1	0+1	0
25	GK	(Spain) ESP	Juanjo	12	0	12+0	0	0+0	0
27	MF	(Spain) ESP	Mario	33	0	24+7	0	2+0	0
28	DF	(Spain) ESP	Mingo	25	0	23+0	0	2+0	0
29	DF	(Spain) ESP	Isma	3	0	3+0	0	0+0	0
30	FW	(Spain) ESP	Salvador Capín	6	0	5+1	0	0+0	0
31	MF	(Spain) ESP	Manolo	21	0	19+2	0	0+0	0
32	DF	(Spain) ESP	Óscar Fernández	2	0	1+1	0	0+0	0
34	DF	(Spain) ESP	Iván Otero	17	0	15+2	0	0+0	0
35	FW	(Spain) ESP	Alberto	4	0	2+2	0	0+0	0
36	FW	(Spain) ESP	Miguel	5	1	4+1	1	0+0	0
