= 2004–05 CD Numancia season =

Numancia
2004–05 season
- President: José Isla
- Head coach: Máximo Hernández
- La Liga: 19th (relegated)
- Copa del Rey: Quarter-finals

The 2004–05 season was the 69th season in the existence of CD Numancia and the club's first season back in the top flight of Spanish football. In addition to the domestic league, Numancia participated in this season's edition of the Copa del Rey. The season covered the period from 1 July 2004 to 30 June 2005.

== Competitions ==
=== Overview ===
| Competition | First match | Last match | Starting round | Final position | Record | | | | | | | |
| Competition | First match | Last match | Starting round | Final position | Pld | W | D | L | GF | GA | GD | Win % |
|---|---|---|---|---|---|---|---|---|---|---|---|---|
| La Liga | 28 August 2004 | 29 May 2005 | Matchday 1 | 19th | 38 | 6 | 11 | 21 | 30 | 61 | −31 | 15.79 |
| Copa del Rey | 27 October 2004 | 16 February 2005 | Round of 64 | Quarter-finals | 6 | 2 | 2 | 2 | 5 | 3 | +2 | 33.33 |
| Total | | | | | 44 | 8 | 13 | 23 | 35 | 64 | −29 | 18.18 |

Source: Competitions

=== La Liga ===
==== League table ====
| Pos | Team | Pld | W | D | L | GF | GA | GD | Pts | Qualification or relegation |
|---|---|---|---|---|---|---|---|---|---|---|
| 16 | Racing Santander | 38 | 12 | 8 | 18 | 41 | 58 | −17 | 44 | |
| 17 | Mallorca | 38 | 10 | 9 | 19 | 42 | 63 | −21 | 39 | |
| 18 | Levante (R) | 38 | 9 | 10 | 19 | 39 | 58 | −19 | 37 | Relegation to the Segunda División |
| 19 | Numancia (R) | 38 | 6 | 11 | 21 | 30 | 61 | −31 | 29 | Relegation to the Segunda División |
| 20 | Albacete (R) | 38 | 6 | 10 | 22 | 33 | 56 | −23 | 28 | Relegation to the Segunda División |

Source: LFP
Rules for classification: 1st points; 2nd head-to-head points; 3rd head-to-head goal difference; 4th head-to-head goals scored; 5th goal difference; 6th number of goals scored; 7th Fair-play points
(R) Relegated

==== Results summary ====
| Overall | | | | | | | | Home | | | | | | Away | | | | | |
| Pld | W | D | L | GF | GA | GD | Pts | W | D | L | GF | GA | GD | W | D | L | GF | GA | GD |
|---|---|---|---|---|---|---|---|---|---|---|---|---|---|---|---|---|---|---|---|
| 38 | 6 | 11 | 21 | 30 | 61 | −31 | 29 | 4 | 9 | 6 | 19 | 23 | −4 | 2 | 2 | 15 | 11 | 38 | −27 |

Source: La Liga

==== Results by round ====
| Round | 1 | 2 | 3 | 4 | 5 | 6 | 7 | 8 | 9 | 10 | 11 | 12 | 13 | 14 | 15 | 16 | 17 | 18 | 19 | 20 | 21 | 22 | 23 | 24 | 25 | 26 | 27 | 28 | 29 | 30 | 31 | 32 | 33 | 34 | 35 | 36 | 37 | 38 |
|---|---|---|---|---|---|---|---|---|---|---|---|---|---|---|---|---|---|---|---|---|---|---|---|---|---|---|---|---|---|---|---|---|---|---|---|---|---|---|
| Ground | H | A | H | A | H | A | H | A | H | A | H | A | H | A | A | H | A | H | A | A | H | A | H | A | H | A | H | A | H | A | H | A | H | H | A | H | A | H |
| Result | D | L | W | L | D | L | L | L | L | L | W | L | W | L | L | D | L | D | D | L | L | L | L | W | D | D | D | L | L | L | W | L | L | D | L | D | W | D |
| Position | 9 | 13 | 9 | 13 | 13 | 18 | 19 | 20 | 20 | 20 | 19 | 20 | 19 | 20 | 20 | 20 | 20 | 20 | 20 | 20 | 20 | 20 | 20 | 20 | 20 | 20 | 20 | 20 | 20 | 20 | 20 | 20 | 20 | 19 | 20 | 20 | 19 | 19 |

Source: La Liga
A = Away; H = Home; W = Win; D = Draw; L = Loss

==== Matches ====
| 28 August 2004 1 | Numancia | 1–1 | Real Betis | Soria |
| CET (UTC+1) | | | | Stadium: Nuevo Estadio Los Pajaritos |

| 11 September 2004 2 | Real Madrid | 1–0 | Numancia | Madrid |
| CET (UTC+1) | | | | Stadium: Santiago Bernabéu Stadium |

| 19 September 2004 3 | Numancia | 1–0 | Getafe | Soria |
| CET (UTC+1) | | | | Stadium: Nuevo Estadio Los Pajaritos |

| 22 September 2004 4 | Málaga | 4–1 | Numancia | Málaga |
| CET (UTC+1) | | | | Stadium: Santiago Bernabéu Stadium |

| 26 September 2004 5 | Numancia | 0–0 | Albacete | Soria |
| CET (UTC+1) | | | | Stadium: Nuevo Estadio Los Pajaritos |

| 3 October 2004 6 | Barcelona | 1–0 | Numancia | Barcelona |
| CET (UTC+1) | | | | Stadium: Camp Nou |

| 17 October 2004 7 | Numancia | 1–3 | Levante | Soria |
| CET (UTC+1) | | | | Stadium: Nuevo Estadio Los Pajaritos |

| 24 October 2004 8 | Villarreal | 4–0 | Numancia | Villarreal |
| CET (UTC+1) | | | | Stadium: Camp Nou |

| 31 October 2004 9 | Numancia | 0–2 | Real Sociedad | Soria |
| CET (UTC+1) | | | | Stadium: Nuevo Estadio Los Pajaritos |

| 7 November 2004 10 | Racing Santander | 2–0 | Numancia | Santander |
| CET (UTC+1) | | | | Stadium: Camp Nou |

| 13 November 2004 11 | Numancia | 2–1 | Sevilla | Soria |
| CET (UTC+1) | | | | Stadium: Nuevo Estadio Los Pajaritos |

| 21 November 2004 12 | Atlético Madrid | 2–0 | Numancia | Madrid |
| CET (UTC+1) | | | | Stadium: Camp Nou |

| 28 November 2004 13 | Numancia | 2–1 | Zaragoza | Soria |
| CET (UTC+1) | | | | Stadium: Nuevo Estadio Los Pajaritos |

| 5 December 2004 14 | Mallorca | 3–2 | Numancia | Palma |
| CET (UTC+1) | | | | Stadium: Camp Nou |

| 12 December 2004 15 | Valencia | 1–0 | Numancia | Valencia |
| CET (UTC+1) | | | | Stadium: Mestalla Stadium |

| 19 December 2004 16 | Numancia | 0–0 | Espanyol | Soria |
| CET (UTC+1) | | | | Stadium: Nuevo Estadio Los Pajaritos |

| 22 December 2004 17 | Osasuna | 2–0 | Numancia | Pamplona |
| CET (UTC+1) | | | | Stadium: Mestalla Stadium |

| 8 January 2005 18 | Numancia | 1–1 | Athletic Bilbao | Soria |
| CET (UTC+1) | | | | Stadium: Nuevo Estadio Los Pajaritos |

| 16 January 2005 19 | Deportivo La Coruña | 1–1 | Numancia | A Coruña |
| CET (UTC+1) | | | | Stadium: Mestalla Stadium |

| 23 January 2005 20 | Real Betis | 4–0 | Numancia | Seville |
| CET (UTC+1) | | | | Stadium: Nuevo Estadio Los Pajaritos |

| 30 January 2005 21 | Numancia | 1–2 | Real Madrid | Soria |
| CET (UTC+1) | | | | Stadium: Nuevo Estadio Los Pajaritos |

| 6 February 2005 22 | Getafe | 1–0 | Numancia | Getafe |
| CET (UTC+1) | | | | Stadium: Nuevo Estadio Los Pajaritos |

| 13 February 2005 23 | Numancia | 0–1 | Málaga | Soria |
| CET (UTC+1) | | | | Stadium: Nuevo Estadio Los Pajaritos |

| 20 February 2005 24 | Albacete | 1–2 | Numancia | Albacete |
| CET (UTC+1) | | | | Stadium: Nuevo Estadio Los Pajaritos |

| 26 February 2005 25 | Numancia | 1–1 | Barcelona | Soria |
| CET (UTC+1) | | | | Stadium: Nuevo Estadio Los Pajaritos |

| 2 March 2005 26 | Levante | 1–1 | Numancia | Valencia |
| CET (UTC+1) | | | | Stadium: Nuevo Estadio Los Pajaritos |

| 6 March 2005 27 | Numancia | 1–1 | Villarreal | Soria |
| CET (UTC+1) | | | | Stadium: Nuevo Estadio Los Pajaritos |

| 13 March 2005 28 | Real Sociedad | 2–1 | Numancia | San Sebastián |
| CET (UTC+1) | | | | Stadium: Nuevo Estadio Los Pajaritos |

| 20 March 2005 29 | Numancia | 2–3 | Racing Santander | Soria |
| CET (UTC+1) | | | | Stadium: Nuevo Estadio Los Pajaritos |

| 3 April 2005 30 | Sevilla | 1–0 | Numancia | Seville |
| CET (UTC+1) | | | | Stadium: Nuevo Estadio Los Pajaritos |

| 9 April 2005 31 | Numancia | 1–0 | Atlético Madrid | Soria |
| CET (UTC+1) | | | | Stadium: Nuevo Estadio Los Pajaritos |

| 17 April 2005 32 | Zaragoza | 4–1 | Numancia | Zaragoza |
| CET (UTC+1) | | | | Stadium: La Romareda |

| 24 April 2005 33 | Numancia | 1–2 | Mallorca | Soria |
| CET (UTC+1) | | | | Stadium: Nuevo Estadio Los Pajaritos |

| 30 April 2005 34 | Numancia | 1–1 | Valencia | Soria |
| CET (UTC+1) | | | | Stadium: Nuevo Estadio Los Pajaritos |

| 8 May 2005 35 | Espanyol | 3–0 | Numancia | Barcelona |
| CET (UTC+1) | | | | Stadium: La Romareda |

| 15 May 2005 36 | Numancia | 2–2 | Osasuna | Soria |
| CET (UTC+1) | | | | Stadium: Nuevo Estadio Los Pajaritos |

| 22 May 2005 37 | Athletic Bilbao | 0–2 | Numancia | Bilbao |
| CET (UTC+1) | | | | Stadium: La Romareda |

| 29 May 2005 38 | Numancia | 1–1 | Deportivo La Coruña | Soria |
| CET (UTC+1) | | | | Stadium: Nuevo Estadio Los Pajaritos |

=== Copa del Rey ===
| 27 October 2004 Round of 64 | Logroñés | 0–3 | Numancia | Logroño |
| CET (UTC+1) | | | | Stadium: Estadio Las Gaunas |

| 10 November 2004 Round of 32 | Córdoba | 1–1 (a.e.t.) (3–4 p) | Numancia | Córdoba |
| CET (UTC+1) | | | | Stadium: Estadio Nuevo Arcángel |

| 12 January 2005 Round of 16; First leg | Elche | 1–0 | Numancia | Elche |
| CET (UTC+1) | Suárez 45' | | | Stadium: Martínez Valero; Referee: Miguel López-Cedrón |

| 19 January 2005 Round of 16; First leg | Numancia | 1–0 (a.e.t.) (5–3 p) | Elche | Soria |
| CET (UTC+1) | Miguel 69' | | | Stadium: Nuevo Estadio Los Pajaritos; Referee: José Javier Losantos Omar |

| 2 February 2005 Quarter-finals; First leg | Numancia | 0–0 | Atlético Madrid | Soria |
| CET (UTC+1) | | | | Stadium: Nuevo Estadio Los Pajaritos |

| 16 February 2005 Quarter-finals; Second leg | Atlético Madrid | 1–0 (1–0 agg.) | Numancia | Madrid |
| CET (UTC+1) | | | | Stadium: Vicente Calderón |
