= Cheryshev =

Cheryshev (Russian: Черышев) is a Russian masculine surname, its feminine counterpart is Cherysheva. It may refer to:

- Denis Cheryshev (born 1990), Russian football player
- Dmitri Cheryshev (born 1969), Russian football player, father of Denis
