= José Jesús Mesas =

Spanish footballer

Mesas
Personal information
- Full name: José Jesús Mesas Puerta
- Date of birth: 24 December 1968 (age 57)
- Place of birth: Madrid, Spain
- Height: 1.85 m (6 ft 1 in)
- Position: Defender

Youth career
- 1981–1983: Real Madrid
- 1983–1984: Aluche
- 1984–1986: Los Yébenes

Senior career*
Years	Team	Apps	(Gls)
1986–1988	Campamento		
1988–1989	Puerta Bonita		
1989–1992	Real Madrid C		
1992–1998	Leganés	184	(4)
1998–2000	Sporting Gijón	47	(0)
2000	Dundee	0	(0)
2001–2002	Lorca		
2002–2003	Ávila	19	(0)
- * Club domestic league appearances and goals

José Jesús Mesas Puerta (born 24 December 1968), known as Mesas, is a Spanish retired footballer who played as a defender, and currently works as a football agent.

== Playing career ==
Mesas began his career with amateur sides in his Madrid, including CD Los Yébenes San Bruno, CD Campamento and CD Puerta Bonita before joining Real Madrid's C-team in 1989. Having not broken into the Real Madrid first team, he left for fellow Spanish side CD Leganés, where he spent six years, playing semi-professionally in Segunda División B and Segunda División whilst also working part-time in a bank.

Mesas turned professional after joining Sporting de Gijón, playing as a first team regular in his first season, before being pushed out by the emergence of Isma Piñera and Yago Alonso. He left for Scottish side Dundee in 2000, but did not have a major impact.

Mesas returned to Spain to finish his career with lower league sides Lorca CF and Real Ávila CF, before retiring at the end of the 2002–2003 season.

== Agent career ==
After retiring, Mesas became a football agent. He has his own agency and also works for the Real Federación Española de Fútbol. He has represented players such as Jesús Navas, Ayoze García, Rubén Suárez and, before his retirement, Sergio Fernández. He is also close friends with Cameroonian footballer Samuel Eto'o.
