= Borja Sánchez =

Borja Sánchez may refer to:

- Borja Sánchez (footballer, born 1978), Spanish football left-back
- Borja Sánchez (footballer, born 1987), Spanish football midfielder
- Borja Sánchez (footballer, born 1996), Spanish football attacking midfielder
