= Antonio Poyatos =

Spanish footballer (born 1966)

Personal information
- Full name: Antonio Poyatos Medina
- Date of birth: 19 February 1966 (age 60)
- Place of birth: Jerez de la Frontera, Spain
- Height: 1.82 m (6 ft 0 in)
- Position: Midfielder

Senior career*
Years	Team	Apps	(Gls)
1985–1991	Xerez	170	(17)
1991–1994	Logroñés	97	(16)
1994–1997	Valencia	82	(10)
1997–1999	Sporting Gijón	39	(0)
Total		388	(43)

Managerial career
- 2010: Xerez (caretaker)
- * Club domestic league appearances and goals

Antonio Poyatos Medina (born 19 February 1966) is a Spanish former professional footballer who played as a midfielder.

He played seven consecutive seasons in La Liga, totalling 204 games and 26 goals for Logroñés, Valencia and Sporting de Gijón. In the Segunda División, made 149 appearances and scored 9 goals for Xerez and Sporting. He was caretaker manager of Xerez for one top-flight game in 2010.

== Career ==
=== Early career ===
Born in Jerez de la Frontera in Andalusia, Poyatos began his career at hometown club Xerez. He made his senior debut with the club in Segunda División B in 1985–86; in the last game of the season on 18 May he scored the only goal of a home win over Ceuta that won the team promotion to the Segunda División.

After Xerez's relegation in 1991, Poyatos transferred to La Liga club CD Logroñés. He had his most prolific season in 1993–94, scoring 8 goals in 36 games for the club from La Rioja; this included two on 19 December in a 3–1 win at Osasuna.

=== Valencia ===
In May 1994, Poyatos agreed to move to Valencia upon the expiration of his contract in July. His first season at the Mestalla Stadium saw his team reach the Copa del Rey final, which they lost 2–1 to Deportivo de La Coruña in a game that was abandoned due to rain with 11 minutes remaining and concluded three days later. In 1996–97 he took part in his only European season as the Che team reached the quarter-finals of the UEFA Cup; he scored their goal in the 1–1 home draw with Schalke 04 in the game that saw them eliminated 3–1 on aggregate.

=== Later career ===
Poyatos transferred to fellow top-flight club Sporting de Gijón in late August 1997, on a three-year deal worth 200 million Spanish pesetas (€1.2 million). His first season at El Molinón resulted in relegation, and in July 1999 he was transfer listed by manager Pedro Braojos.

After retiring from playing, Poyatos became part of the coaching staff at Xerez. On 12 January 2010, halfway through the only top-flight season of their history, the club sacked manager José Ángel Ziganda and put Poyatos in charge as caretaker manager. Five days later, in the only managerial game of his career, he led the club to a goalless draw at Real Zaragoza. Néstor Gorosito was then appointed on 19 January.
