= Vladimir Popović (footballer, born 1976) =

Montenegrin footballer

Personal information
- Full name: Vladimir Popović
- Date of birth: 5 June 1976 (age 50)
- Place of birth: Titograd, Yugoslavia
- Height: 1.82 m (6 ft 0 in)
- Position: Midfielder

Senior career*
Years	Team	Apps	(Gls)
1993–1996	Budućnost Podgorica	21+	(1+)
1997	Zemun	15	(3)
1998	Sporting Gijón	11	(0)
1998–1999	Málaga	7	(1)
1999–2000	Getafe	10	(1)
2000–2002	Zemun	15	(4)
2002–2003	Železnik	0	(0)
2003–2008	Kom	28+	(1+)
- * Club domestic league appearances and goals

Vladimir Popović (Cyrillic: Владимир Поповић; born 5 June 1976) is a Montenegrin former football midfielder.

== Club career ==
He played for FK Budućnost Podgorica, FK Zemun, Sporting de Gijón, Málaga CF, Getafe CF, FK Železnik and FK Kom.
