= Xavi Molist =

Spanish footballer

Personal information
- Full name: Xavier Molist Berga
- Date of birth: 6 February 1977 (age 49)
- Place of birth: Girona, Spain
- Height: 1.81 m (5 ft 11 in)
- Position: Forward

Team information
- Current team: Xerez (manager)

Youth career
- EF Osona

Senior career*
Years	Team	Apps	(Gls)
1994–1995	Manlleu	8	(3)
1995–1997	Barcelona C	50	(16)
1995–2000	Barcelona B	46	(4)
1998–1999	→ Neuchâtel Xamax (loan)	35	(6)
1999–2000	→ Logroñés (loan)	25	(4)
2000–2001	Sabadell	32	(9)
2001–2003	Badajoz	57	(11)
2003	Gimnàstic	16	(9)
2003–2005	Terrassa	50	(8)
2005	Castellón	20	(6)
2005–2008	Cartagena	109	(34)
2008–2010	Badalona	46	(4)
2010–2013	Terrassa	76	(24)
2013–2014	Horta	44	(20)
Total		614	(158)

Managerial career
- 2014–2015: Horta (youth)
- 2015–2017: Horta
- 2017–2019: Hospitalet
- 2019–2020: Terrassa
- 2022–2025: Sant Andreu
- 2025: Estepona
- 2026–: Xerez
- * Club domestic league appearances and goals

Xavier "Xavi" Molist Berga (born 6 February 1977) is a Spanish football manager and former player who played as a forward. He is the current manager of Xerez CD.

== Playing career ==
Born in Girona, Catalonia, Molist began his career with AEC Manlleu before moving to FC Barcelona in January 1995. Initially assigned to the C-team, he made his professional debut with the reserves on 18 November 1995, in a 3–2 Segunda División home loss to Deportivo Alavés.

Molist became a regular starter for the B's during the 1997–98 season, and subsequently served loan stints at Swiss side Neuchâtel Xamax FC and CD Logroñés. He left Barça in September 2000, and joined CE Sabadell FC in Segunda División B the following month.

Molist agreed to a contract with CD Badajoz in the second division in 2001, and was a regular starter for the club in his first season. He left for Gimnàstic de Tarragona in the third tier in January 2003, but returned to division two in July after signing for Terrassa FC.

Molist moved to CD Castellón in the third tier in January 2005, and helped in the side's promotion to the second division before joining FC Cartagena. He signed for fellow third division side CF Badalona in 2008, but suffered an Achilles tendon injury which sidelined him for nine months.

Molist returned to Terrassa in 2010, with the club now in the fourth tier. He left the club on 15 February 2013, and joined Primera Catalana side UA Horta four days later.

Molist announced his retirement in June 2014, aged 37, after featuring in nearly 700 official matches.

== Managerial career ==
Immediately after retiring, Molist became manager of the Juvenil side of his last club Horta. He took over the first team squad in 2015, and led the club to a promotion to the fourth tier in 2017.

On 12 June 2017, Molist was appointed manager of CE L'Hospitalet in the fourth division. He was sacked on 7 April 2019, before taking over Terrassa on 4 June.

Dismissed by Terrassa on 29 December 2020, and spent more than a year without a club before being named at the helm of UE Sant Andreu on 28 February 2022. He renewed his contract for a further year on 6 April, and agreed to a new one-year extension on 15 June 2023, after achieving promotion to Segunda Federación.

== Managerial statistics ==
As of match played 30 November 2025

Managerial record by team and tenure
Team	Nat	From	To	Record								Ref
Team	Nat	From	To	G	W	D	L	GF	GA	GD	Win %	Ref
Horta	(Spain)	1 July 2015	12 June 2017	68	34	21	13	109	66	+43	50.00	
Hospitalet	(Spain)	12 June 2017	7 April 2019	77	43	15	19	125	61	+64	55.84	
Terrassa	(Spain)	4 June 2019	28 December 2020	39	21	11	7	61	29	+32	53.85	
Sant Andreu	(Spain)	28 February 2022	31 May 2025	127	66	33	28	207	126	+81	51.97	
Estepona	(Spain)	2 October 2025	4 December 2025	10	1	0	9	10	21	−11	10.00	
Career total				321	165	80	76	512	303	+209	51.40	—
