= Álex Pereira =

Venezuelan footballer (born 1977)

Personal information
- Full name: Alejandro Américo Pereira Amorim
- Date of birth: 15 January 1977 (age 49)
- Place of birth: Caracas, Venezuela
- Height: 1.80 m (5 ft 11 in)
- Position: Centre back

Senior career*
Years	Team	Apps	(Gls)
1997–1998	Langreo	20	(4)
1998–2000	Sporting B	68	(4)
2000–2001	Sporting Gijón	10	(0)
2001–2005	Recreativo	64	(0)
Total		162	(8)
- * Club domestic league appearances and goals

Alejandro Américo «Álex» Pereira Amorim (born 15 January 1977) is a former footballer who played as a central defender.

He spent his entire professional career in Spain, with Sporting de Gijón and Recreativo.

== Football career ==
The son of a Venezuelan father and a Portuguese mother, Pereira was born in Caracas and moved with his family to Spain in his teens, settling in Asturias. His first club was lowly UP Langreo, for which he played one season in the third division.

In 1998, Pereira signed for neighbouring Sporting de Gijón, but appeared rarely for the first team during his spell, only collecting ten second level appearances. After three years he joined fellow league side Recreativo de Huelva, experiencing his best season as a professional in his debut campaign as the Andalusians returned to La Liga after a 24-year absence (26 games played).

In 2002–03, Pereira appeared in 15 matches – all starts – as Recre was immediately relegated back. After no appearances in the 2004–05 season, due to injury, he retired from football at the age of only 28.
