= Rodrigão (footballer, born 1972) =

Brazilian footballer

Personal information
- Full name: Rodrigo Dias Carneiro
- Date of birth: 20 May 1972 (age 54)
- Place of birth: Uberlândia, Brazil
- Height: 1.85 m (6 ft 1 in)
- Position: Midfielder

Youth career
- 1988–1990: Fluminense

Senior career*
Years	Team	Apps	(Gls)
1991	Flamengo		
1992–1993	Botafogo		
1993–1996	União Madeira	49	(2)
1996–1998	Braga	47	(0)
1998	Sporting Gijón	8	(1)
1998–1999	Málaga	0	(0)
1999–2000	Manchego	32	(7)
2000	Guadix	13	(2)
2001	Braga	4	(0)
2001	Botafogo	8	(1)
2005	Vitória-PE	14	(6)
2006	Atlético Paranaense		
2006–2007	Al-Hilal		
- * Club domestic league appearances and goals

Rodrigo Dias Carneiro, known as Rodrigão (born 20 May 1972) is a Brazilian former football player.

== Club career ==
He played 5 seasons and 94 games in the Primeira Liga for Braga and União Madeira.

== International ==
He represented Brazil at the 1991 FIFA World Youth Championship.
