= Marko Perović (footballer, born 1972) =

Serbian football manager and player

Personal information
- Full name: Marko Perović
- Date of birth: 24 March 1972 (age 54)
- Place of birth: Leskovac, SR Serbia, SFR Yugoslavia
- Height: 1.82 m (6 ft 0 in)
- Position: Midfielder

Team information
- Current team: Lion City Sailors (assistant coach)

Youth career
- Dubočica

Senior career*
Years	Team	Apps	(Gls)
1988–1990	Dubočica		
1990–1994	Vojvodina	62	(8)
1994–1995	Red Star Belgrade	33	(7)
1995–1997	Cremonese	46	(8)
1997–1998	Vitesse	40	(19)
1999–2000	Sporting Gijón	29	(4)
2001	Austria Wien	8	(1)
2001–2002	Rad	23	(3)
2002–2004	Ancona	34	(6)
2004	Napoli	15	(3)
2004–2006	Grosseto	31	(2)
2006	Pistoiese	10	(0)
Total		331	(61)

International career
1995–1996	FR Yugoslavia	3	(0)

Managerial career
- 2010–2011: Vojvodina (assistant)
- 2011–2012: Spartak Subotica (assistant)
- 2012–2013: OFK Beograd (assistant)
- 2013–2014: Cremonese (youth)
- 2014–2015: Cremonese (assistant)
- 2016: Anorthosis (assistant)
- 2018: Rad (assistant)
- 2020: Železničar Pančevo
- 2022: Dubočica
- 2023–: Lion City Sailors (assistant)
- * Club domestic league appearances and goals

Marko Perović (Serbian Cyrillic: Марко Перовић; born 24 March 1972) is a Serbian football manager and former player who is currently the assistant coach of Singapore Premier League club Lion City Sailors.

== Club career ==
After starting out at his hometown club Dubočica, Perović played for Vojvodina, Red Star Belgrade, Cremonese, Vitesse, Sporting Gijón, Austria Wien, Rad, Ancona, Napoli, Grosseto, and Pistoiese.

== International career ==
At international level, Perović was capped three times for FR Yugoslavia from 1995 to 1996.

== Managerial career ==
Perović started his coaching career working as an assistant under Zoran Milinković at Vojvodina in July 2010. Perović went on to follow Milinković continuing to become his assistant at Spartak Subotica in 2011 and OFK Beograd on 18 September 2012.

Perović became Cremonese assistant coach on 25 June 2014 working under Marco Giampaolo and later with Mario Montorfano.

On 18 February 2016, Perović reunited with Milinković where he continue working as his assistant at Anorthosis. However a disappointing run in the league saw them both getting sacked from the Cypriot club.

On 26 February 2018, Perović reunited with Milinković again where they joined Rad in their native country.

In July 2020, Perović served as manager of Železničar Pančevo making his first managerial role.

On 4 February 2022, Perović was appointed as the manager of second tier Serbian club Dubočica.

On 19 July 2023, Perović was appointed by Singapore Premier League club Lion City Sailors working under compatriot Aleksandar Ranković as his assistant.
