= Romano Sion =

Dutch footballer

Romano Sion (born 9 June 1971) is a Dutch former footballer who played as a striker.

In a professional career that lasted 15 years, he amassed Eredivisie totals of 109 matches and 28 goals over seven seasons, mainly with Groningen (three years). He also competed in Spain and Portugal, notably with Compostela.

== Club career ==
Born in Paramaribo, Suriname, Sion started playing football with HFC Haarlem, competing with the club in both the Eredivisie and the Eerste Divisie. In 1991, he moved to the top flight with FC Dordrecht and, after a brief spell with RBC Roosendaal, signed for FC Groningen where he experienced his best seasons in the competition, scoring ten goals in 25 games in 1994–95 and netting eight in 27 in the following campaign; whilst a trialist at Millwall, he appeared for them in the 1992–93 Anglo-Italian Cup against Portsmouth.

After spending the second part of 1996–97 with FC Emmen in the second tier, Sion moved to Spain and joined SD Compostela. He scored six times in his first year with the Galicians, in only 16 matches – including a hat-trick in a 6–2 away win against Deportivo de La Coruña in a local derby– but the team suffered relegation from La Liga and he played a further three seasons with them in Segunda División, being involved in several spats with elusive chairman José María Caneda.

Sion signed with Portugal's Vitória de Guimarães in January 2001, being sparingly used during his one-and-a-half season spell. For the 2002–03 campaign he joined another club in the country, Rio Ave F.C. of the Segunda Liga.

Following a very short stint back in Spain with Universidad de Las Palmas CF Sion returned to his homeland, seeing out the remainder of his career in amateur football.
