= Sergio Sánchez (footballer, born 1977) =

Spanish footballer

Personal information
- Full name: Sergio Sánchez Sánchez
- Date of birth: 28 April 1977 (age 49)
- Place of birth: Carbayín Alto, Spain
- Height: 1.90 m (6 ft 3 in)
- Position: Goalkeeper

Youth career
- Rayo Carbayín
- Sporting Gijón

Senior career*
Years	Team	Apps	(Gls)
1995–1998	Sporting Gijón B	52	(0)
1998–1999	Sporting Gijón	26	(0)
1999–2005	Atlético Madrid	15	(0)
1999–2000	→ Sporting Gijón (loan)	10	(0)
2002–2003	→ Espanyol (loan)	6	(0)
2003–2005	→ Getafe (loan)	29	(0)
2005–2006	Hércules	17	(0)
2007	Den Haag	9	(0)
2007–2009	Sporting Gijón	9	(0)
Total		173	(0)

Managerial career
- 2010–2011: Candás (assistant)
- 2019–2021: Sporting Gijón (youth)
- 2021–2022: Sporting Gijón B
- 2023–2024: Marino
- * Club domestic league appearances and goals

Sergio Sánchez Sánchez (born 28 April 1977) is a Spanish former professional footballer who played as a goalkeeper, currently a manager.

== Playing career ==
Sánchez was born in Carbayín Alto, Siero, Asturias. Having joined local Sporting de Gijón's youth system as an infant, he first appeared with the professionals during the 1998–99 season as the club was in the Segunda División. Another spell at that level, with Atlético Madrid, would follow, although he played almost no part in the Colchoneros's return to La Liga in 2001–02 (three games). He was signed by the latter in October 1999, but remained on loan to the former until June of the following year.

Loaned by Atlético to RCD Espanyol in 2002–03– making his top-flight debut on 2 September 2002 in a 2–0 away loss against Real Madrid– Sánchez would meet the same fate the following campaign, with Getafe CF. There, he would appear in exactly half of the matches as the Madrid outskirts side achieved a first-ever promotion to the top tier, only collecting eight appearances during 2004–05.

After an unassuming stint with Hércules CF, Sánchez signed for lowly UD Melilla, leaving shortly after for personal reasons. He finished the season with ADO Den Haag in the Netherlands.

Sánchez returned to Gijón for 2007–08, featuring only once in the league as his team returned to the first division after a ten-year absence. He began the next season as the starter but, after conceding 19 goals in four matches (most in 50 years of competition), he would be relegated to the bench, being reinstated in late December following Iván Cuéllar's serious ankle injury in a 3–0 defeat at Athletic Bilbao. With Iñaki Lafuente's arrival on loan from that club in January 2009 and Cuéllar's recovery, he would be demoted to third choice, and was eventually released in July.

== Coaching career ==
In 2010, after one year without a club, Sánchez retired from football at the age of 33. He had his first coaching experience with amateurs Candás CF as assistant to another former Sporting player, Abelardo Fernández. Simultaneously, he opened his own football school, Dorsal 13.

Sánchez returned to Gijón in 2011, being appointed reserves goalkeeper coach and youth team manager. On 25 January 2021, he replaced his former Sporting teammate Samuel Baños as head coach of the B side, being relegated to the newly created Tercera Federación at the end of the season but being retained nonetheless.

On 3 June 2023, Sánchez was appointed at neighbouring Marino de Luanco in the Segunda Federación.
