= Abdeljalil Hadda =

Moroccan footballer

Camacho
Personal information
- Full name: Abdeljalil Hadda
- Date of birth: 22 March 1972 (age 54)
- Place of birth: Meknes, Morocco
- Height: 1.79 m (5 ft 10 1/2 in)
- Position: Striker

Youth career
- COD Meknès

Senior career*
Years	Team	Apps	(Gls)
1992–1996	CO de Meknès	180	(95)
1996–1997	Ittihad FC		
1997–1998	Club Africain	20	(29)
1998–2001	Sporting de Gijón	35	(9)
2000	→ Yokohama F. Marinos (loan)	0	(0)
2001–2002	Club Africain	20	(15)
2002–2003	MAS de Fès	16	(7)
2003–2004	CO de Meknès	5	(5)
Total		276	(169)

International career
1995–2002	Morocco	48	(23)
- * Club domestic league appearances and goals

Abdeljalil Hadda (Arabic: عبدالجليل حدّا; born 23 March 1972), sometimes nicknamed Kamatcho, is a Moroccan retired footballer who played as a striker.

== Club career ==
Born in Meknes, Hadda started playing for local CODM, moving to Saudi Arabia for Ittihad in 1996. After a spell in Tunisia he signed with Real Sporting de Gijón in Spain, going on to appear irregularly for the Asturias side in Segunda División and also being loaned to Yokohama F. Marinos.

Released by Real Sporting in 2001, Kamatcho returned to Club Africain for one more season, then moved back to his country, where he retired two years later at the age of 32.

== International career ==
A Morocco international on 41 occasions (19 goals), Hadda appeared for the country at the 1998 FIFA World Cup, where he scored twice in three games in an eventual group stage exit. He also participated in the 1998 and 2000 African Cup of Nations.

== Career statistics ==
=== International ===
Appearances and goals by national team and year
National team	Year	Apps	Goals
Morocco
Morocco	1995	1	0
Morocco	1996	4	3
Morocco	1997	5	1
Morocco	1998	9	4
Morocco	1999	8	3
Morocco	2000	7	2
Morocco	2001	10	4
Morocco	2002	4	2
Total		48	19

Scores and results list Morocco's goal tally first, score column indicates score after each Hadda goal.

List of international goals scored by Abdeljalil Hadda
No.	Date	Venue	Opponent	Score	Result	Competition
1	3 January 1996	Stade Moulay Abdellah, Rabat, Morocco	Tunisia	3 – 1	3 – 1	Friendly
2	17 January 1996	Stade Jules Ladoumègue, Vitrolles, France	Armenia	5 – 0	6 – 0	Friendly
3	7 February 1996	Stade Moulay Abdellah, Rabat, Morocco	Luxembourg	2 – 0	2 – 0	Friendly
4	26 November 1997	Stade Moulay Abdellah, Rabat, Morocco	Togo	2 – 0	3 – 0	Friendly
5	10 June 1998	Stade de la Mosson, Montpellier, France	Norway	1 – 0	2 – 2	1998 FIFA World Cup
6	23 June 1998	Stade Geoffroy-Guichard, Saint-Étienne, France	Scotland	2 – 0	3 – 0	1998 FIFA World Cup
7	3 October 1998	Stade Mohamed V, Casablanca, Morocco	Sierra Leone	3 – 0	3 – 0	2000 African Cup of Nations qualification
8	23 December 1998	Agadir, Morocco	Bulgaria	2 – 0	4 – 1	Friendly
9	28 February 1999	Stade Municipal (Lomé), Lomé, Togo	Togo	1 – 0	3 – 2	2000 African Cup of Nations qualification
10	28 February 1999	Stade Municipal (Lomé), Lomé, Togo	Togo	3 – 2	3 – 2	2000 African Cup of Nations qualification
11	6 June 1999	Stade Moulay Abdellah, Rabat, Morocco	Guinea	1 – 0	1 – 0	2000 African Cup of Nations qualification
12	9 July 2000	Fez Stadium, Fez, Morocco	Algeria	1 – 1	2 – 1	2002 FIFA World Cup qualification
13	9 July 2000	Fez Stadium, Fez, Morocco	Algeria	2 – 1	2 – 1	2002 FIFA World Cup qualification
14	13 January 2001	Stade El Menzah, Tunis, Tunisia	Tunisia	1 – 0	1 – 0	2002 African Cup of Nations qualification
15	24 March 2001	Stade Moulay Abdellah, Rabat, Morocco	Tunisia	2 – 0	2 – 0	2002 African Cup of Nations qualification
16	21 April 2001	Stade Moulay Abdellah, Rabat, Morocco	Namibia	2 – 0	3 – 0	2002 FIFA World Cup qualification
17	21 April 2001	Stade Moulay Abdellah, Rabat, Morocco	Namibia	3 – 0	3 – 0	2002 FIFA World Cup qualification
18	13 June 2002	Stade Moulay Abdellah, Rabat, Morocco	Guinea	1 – 0	2 – 1	Friendly
19	16 June 2002	Independence Stadium Banjul, Gambia	Gambia	2 – 0	2 – 0	Friendly
