= Manolo Sánchez (footballer, born 1976) =

Spanish footballer and manager

Personal information
- Full name: Manuel Sánchez Murias
- Date of birth: 27 November 1976 (age 49)
- Place of birth: Gijón, Spain
- Height: 1.77 m (5 ft 9 1/2 in)
- Position: Winger

Youth career
- Llano 2000
- Sporting Gijón

Senior career*
Years	Team	Apps	(Gls)
1995–1998	Sporting Gijón B	44	(3)
1995–1996	→ Gijón Industrial (loan)	32	(5)
1998–2000	Sporting Gijón	57	(4)
2000–2005	Celta	20	(1)
2001	→ Osasuna (loan)	3	(0)
2002	→ Córdoba (loan)	10	(0)
2002–2003	→ Numancia (loan)	15	(0)
2004	→ Tenerife (loan)	14	(0)
2005–2008	Racing Ferrol	66	(2)
Total		229	(10)

Managerial career
- 2009: Racing Ferrol
- 2011–2012: Sporting Gijón B
- 2012: Sporting Gijón
- 2019: Sporting Gijón B
- 2023–2024: Avilés
- 2024–2026: Kannur Warriors
- * Club domestic league appearances and goals

Manuel "Manolo" Sánchez Murias (born 27 November 1976) is a Spanish former professional footballer who played as a left winger. He is currently a manager.

== Playing career ==
Born in Gijón, Sánchez played three years with local Sporting de Gijón's first team, his La Liga output consisting of 19 games – no goals – in the 1997–98 season, which ended in relegation with an all-low 13 points. In summer 2000 he moved to RC Celta de Vigo, appearing in seven more matches in the top flight (scoring against CA Osasuna in a 2–0 away win on 10 September 2000) and being loaned several times for the duration of his contract, mostly to Segunda División sides.

In 2005–06 campaign, Sánchez joined Racing de Ferrol also of the second division, going on to experience two relegations and one promotion with the Galicians. He retired in June 2008, at the age of 31.

== Coaching career ==
Sánchez began his manager career immediately after retiring, starting with his last club as a player in the Segunda División B. He was relieved of his duties on 24 February 2009.

After two years working with Sporting's youth academy, Sánchez was appointed reserve-team coach by the Asturians. However, after the end of the 2011–12 season, which ended in top-tier relegation, Javier Clemente was dismissed from the main squad and he was appointed his successor.

On 18 October 2012, after collecting five losses and only two wins in the league's first nine rounds, and immediately after disposing of CD Mirandés in the third round of the Copa del Rey (2–1 home victory), Sánchez was fired by Sporting. On 17 September of the following year he returned to the club, being named director of the football academy at Mareo.

Sánchez returned to Sporting B on 18 March 2019, as a replacement for Isma Piñera.

== Managerial statistics ==
As of 19 May 2019

Managerial record by team and tenure
Team	Nat	From	To	Record								Ref
Team	Nat	From	To	G	W	D	L	GF	GA	GD	Win %	Ref
Racing Ferrol	(Spain)	18 January 2009	24 February 2009	5	2	2	1	6	6	+0	40.00	
Sporting Gijón B	(Spain)	23 June 2011	17 May 2012	38	11	15	12	42	45	−3	28.95	
Sporting Gijón	(Spain)	17 May 2012	18 October 2012	11	4	2	5	13	16	−3	36.36	
Sporting Gijón B	(Spain)	18 March 2019	6 July 2019	9	5	2	2	12	6	+6	55.56	
Total				63	22	21	20	73	73	+0	34.92	—
