= Carlos Torres (footballer, born 1968) =

Paraguayan footballer

Personal information
- Full name: Carlos Luis Torres Martínez
- Date of birth: 20 March 1968 (age 58)
- Place of birth: Asunción, Paraguay
- Height: 1.81 m (5 ft 11 in)
- Position: Striker

Senior career*
Years	Team	Apps	(Gls)
1988–1991	Olimpia		
1992–1993	Racing Club	51	(19)
1993–1994	Newell's Old Boys	21	(1)
1994–1995	Argentinos Juniors	37	(9)
1995–2000	Badajoz	182	(45)
2000–2001	Jaén	43	(5)
2002	Ciudad Murcia	18	(1)
2002–2003	Jaén	31	(9)
2004–2005	Tacuary	43	(6)
Total		426	(95)

International career
1993–1995	Paraguay	8	(0)
- * Club domestic league appearances and goals

Carlos Luis Torres Martínez (born 20 March 1968) is a Paraguayan former footballer who played as a striker.

== Club career ==
Born in Asunción, Torres began playing professionally with hometown's Club Olimpia, winning back-to-back Primera División titles with it. In 1991 he also helped the team reach the final of the Copa Libertadores, lost on aggregate to Chile's Colo-Colo (0–3). During that year he was crowned the domestic competition's topscorer in 1991, at 12 goals.

After that Libertadores tournament Torres moved to Argentina, where he would represent three clubs with different individual success (he scored nearly 50 official goals for Racing Club de Avellaneda and Argentinos Juniors combined, but only found the net once in the first division with Newell's Old Boys). He moved to Europe in 1995, joining Spanish second division side CD Badajoz and helping the Extremadurans to five consecutive seasons in the category whilst playing in more than 200 official games – never appeared in less than 34 in the league during his spell – and surpassing the 50-goal mark.

Aged 32, still in Spain and its second level, Torres signed for Real Jaén, being relegated in his second season – however, he had already left the Andalusians in the previous transfer window, moving to another team in the country, Ciudad de Murcia. After only a couple of months, he returned to his previous club.

Torres closed out his career in 2005, representing Tacuary in his homeland.

== International career ==
Torres represented Paraguay at the 1993 Copa América in Ecuador, as the national team exited in the quarterfinals after a 0–3 loss against the hosts.
