= Igor Lediakhov =

Russian footballer

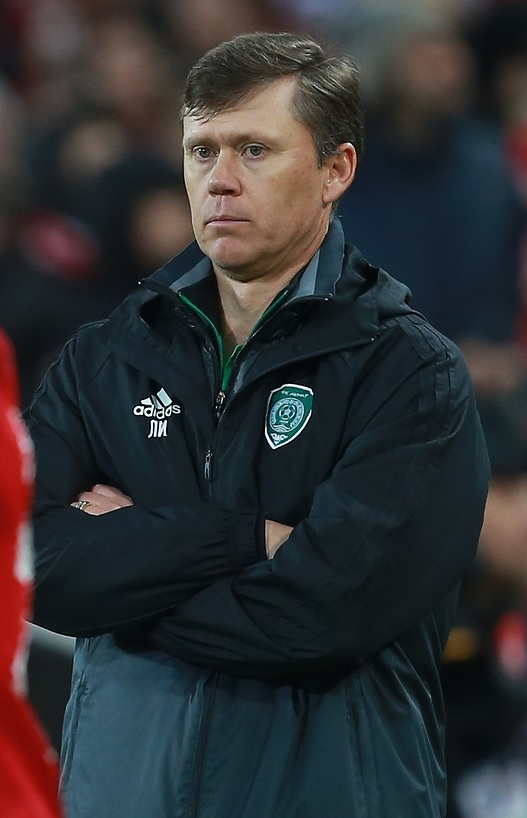
- Lediakhov coaching Akhmat Grozny in 2018

Personal information
- Full name: Igor Anatolyevich Lediakhov
- Date of birth: 22 May 1968 (age 58)
- Place of birth: Sochi, Soviet Union
- Height: 1.88 m (6 ft 2 in)
- Position: Midfielder

Youth career
- Torpedo Taganrog

Senior career*
Years	Team	Apps	(Gls)
1986	FC Torpedo Taganrog	7	(0)
1988–1989	SKA Rostov-on-Don	64	(1)
1990	Dnipro Dnipropetrovsk	6	(1)
1991–1992	Rotor Volgograd	38	(2)
1992–1994	Spartak Moscow	99	(26)
1994–2002	Sporting Gijón	209	(41)
1998	→ Yokohama Flügels (loan)	23	(15)
2002–2003	Eibar	19	(1)
Total		427	(82)

International career
1992	CIS	7	(1)
1992–1994	Russia	9	(0)

Managerial career
- 2008: Spartak Moscow (youth)
- 2008: Spartak Moscow (caretaker)
- 2008–2009: Spartak Moscow (assistant)
- 2010: Shinnik
- 2011–2013: Spartak Moscow (assistant)
- 2013: Rotor Volgograd
- 2013–2018: Terek/Akhmat Grozny (assistant)
- 2018: Akhmat Grozny (caretaker)
- 2018: Akhmat Grozny
- 2018: Baltika Kaliningrad
- * Club domestic league appearances and goals

Igor Anatolyevich Lediakhov (Russian: Игорь Анатольевич Ледяхов; born 22 May 1968) is a Russian football coach and a former player who played as an attacking midfielder.

He played for almost a decade in Spain, mainly for Sporting de Gijón (eight years, amassing La Liga totals of 106 games and 17 goals in four seasons), later embarking in a managerial career in his country.

Lediakhov represented the CIS at Euro 1992 and Russia at the 1994 World Cup.

== Club career ==
Born in Sochi, Russia, Lediakhov started playing professionally with modest FC SKA Rostov-on-Don. In 1990, he joined FC Dnipro Dnipropetrovsk.

After impressing with FC Rotor Volgograd, Lediakhov was bought by Soviet Union giants FC Spartak Moscow, being essential as the capital team conquered three consecutive league titles, which included the inaugural edition of the competition, as the player scored in double digits in two of the three seasons.

In the 1994 summer, 26-year-old Lediakhov moved abroad, signing with Spain's Sporting de Gijón. Even though he netted nearly 50 overall goals for the club (17 in four La Liga seasons) whilst showcasing good offensive skills, his eight-year-old stay in Asturias was an inconsistent one, marred by irregular performances and disciplinary problems: he received a six-match ban after a 22 February 2000 match at Albacete Balompié, after assaulting an opponent then repeatedly pushing referee Téllez Sánchez after receiving his marching orders. At the club, he teamed up with compatriots Dmitri Cheryshev (five seasons), Yuri Nikiforov (two) and Alexei Kosolapov (one).

Lediakhov also spent a few months in Japan (loaned by Sporting and coinciding with Paulo Futre), after which he returned – with the club now in the second level – having further disciplinary problems which led to a suspension. He eventually bought out his contract and retired in 2003 at the age of 35, after one season with SD Eibar also in division two.

== International career ==
Lediakhov gained 16 international caps for both the CIS and Russia, which he represented respectively at UEFA Euro 1992 (did not leave the bench) the 1994 FIFA World Cup (played one match, the 6–1 group stage routing of Cameroon).

== Coaching career ==
In 2007, Lediakhov worked as sporting director at FC Rostov. On 6 June of the following year, he was assigned coaching duties at Spartak Moscow's youth teams.

From August to September 2008, Lediakhov served as caretaker manager of the club, later working as assistant under both Michael Laudrup and the Dane's successor, Valery Karpin.

On 22 December 2009, he was appointed head coach of FC Shinnik Yaroslavl, staying in charge for approximately five months. On 9 May 2011, he was announced as new director of football at FC Rotor Volgograd, for which he also acted as scout.

Lediakhov returned for a second spell as Spartak's assistant, on 6 September 2011.

On 7 April 2018, he became the caretaker manager for Russian Premier League's FC Akhmat Grozny following the resignation of Mikhail Galaktionov. On 22 May 2018, he was signed as Akhmat's manager on a permanent basis. He resigned from Akhmat on 2 September 2018.

On 20 September 2018, he signed with FC Baltika Kaliningrad until the end of the 2018–19 season. He was dismissed by Baltika on 19 December 2018.

== Career statistics ==
=== Club ===
Appearances and goals by club, season and competition
Club	Season	League		
Club	Season	Division	Apps	Goals
Torpedo Taganrog	1986	Second League	7	0
SKA Rostov-on-Don	1988	Soviet First League	23	0
SKA Rostov-on-Don	1989	Soviet First League	41	1
SKA Rostov-on-Don	Total		64	1
Dnipro Dnipropetrovsk	1990	Top League	6	1
Rotor Volgograd	1991	First League	34	2
Spartak Moscow	1992	Top League	24	10
Spartak Moscow	1993	Top League	29	6
Spartak Moscow	1994	Top League	12	5
Spartak Moscow	Total		65	21
Sporting Gijón	1994–95	La Liga	23	2
Sporting Gijón	1995–96	La Liga	30	8
Sporting Gijón	1996–97	La Liga	36	3
Sporting Gijón	1997–98	La Liga	17	4
Sporting Gijón	1998–99	Segunda División	20	5
Sporting Gijón	1999–2000	Segunda División	29	12
Sporting Gijón	2000–01	Segunda División	36	6
Sporting Gijón	2001–02	Segunda División	18	1
Sporting Gijón	Total		209	41
Yokohama Flügels (loan)	1998	J1 League	23	15
Eibar	2002–03	Segunda División	19	1
Career total			458	87

=== International ===
Appearances and goals by national team and year
National team	Year	Apps	Goals
CIS	1992	7	1
Total		7	1
Russia	1992	2	0
Russia	1993	5	0
Russia	1994	1	0
Total		8	0

== Honours ==
- Russian League: 1992, 1993, 1994
- CIS Cup: 1992
- Russian Cup: 1994
