= Iván Otero =

Spanish footballer

Personal information
- Full name: Iván Otero Yugueros
- Date of birth: 16 April 1977 (age 49)
- Place of birth: Oviedo, Spain
- Height: 1.85 m (6 ft 1 in)
- Position: Centre back

Youth career
- 1993–1996: Sporting Gijón

Senior career*
Years	Team	Apps	(Gls)
1995–1998	Sporting Gijón B	52	(1)
1997–2001	Sporting Gijón	29	(0)
1999–2000	→ Getafe (loan)	28	(0)
2001–2004	Ourense	100	(4)
2004–2007	Zamora	84	(4)
2005	→ Logroñés (loan)	15	(0)
2007–2009	Cultural Leonesa	47	(3)
2009	Zamora	12	(1)
2010	Ejea	7	(0)
2010–2015	Langreo	147	(9)
2015–2016	Avilés	20	(0)
2016–2019	Juvencia		
- * Club domestic league appearances and goals as of 28 May 2017

Iván Otero Yugueros (born 16 April 1977 in Oviedo, Asturias) is a Spanish former footballer who played as a central defender.
