= Óscar Arias (footballer) =

German-born Spanish footballer

Personal information
- Full name: Óscar Luis Arias Suárez
- Date of birth: 5 January 1966 (age 60)
- Place of birth: Kassel, Germany
- Height: 1.80 m (5 ft 11 in)
- Position: Midfielder

Youth career
- Olimpic Onubense

Senior career*
Years	Team	Apps	(Gls)
1988–1993	Recreativo	92	(17)
1988–1989	→ Ayamonte (loan)		
1989–1990	→ Fuengirola (loan)		
1993–1995	Compostela	12	(0)
1995–1996	Alavés	48	(5)
1996–1998	Lleida	63	(15)
1998–2000	Sporting Gijón	59	(5)
2000–2002	Recreativo	58	(6)
Total		332	(48)
- * Club domestic league appearances and goals

Óscar Luis Arias Suárez (born 5 January 1966), known simply as Óscar, is a Spanish former footballer who played as a midfielder, and is the director of football of Cádiz CF.

In a career that involved two spells at Recreativo, he also represented four other teams in Segunda División, totalling 225 matches and 28 goals in that division. He later served as sporting director at his main club, Las Palmas, Sevilla and Cádiz.

== Playing career ==
Born in Kassel in the German state of Hesse to Spanish parents, Óscar returned to Spain at a young age, and began his career at Andalusian amateurs Ayamonte CF and CD Fuengirola in the late 1980s. In 1990, he joined Recreativo de Huelva, where he spent a couple of Segunda División B seasons; he was sent off three times in 28 games over 1992–93.

At its conclusion, Óscar signed with SD Compostela, playing 12 matches as the Galician club promoted from Segunda División in his debut campaign. On 11 September 1994, he made his only career appearance in La Liga, coming on as a substitute for Christopher Ohen for the final 19 minutes of a 2–2 away draw against Real Oviedo; later that year he moved to Deportivo Alavés, scoring three goals in 15 appearances as they ascended from the third tier.

From 1995 until 2002, Óscar competed in the second level, representing, other than Alavés, UE Lleida, Sporting de Gijón and former side Recreativo. He retired at the age of 36, after contributing with two goals from 23 matches as the latter won top-flight promotion.

== Post-retirement ==
After his retirement, Arias took a position on Recreativo's foundation and their academy. During the 2004–05 season, he took over as sporting director after the death of José Rivera, and during his tenure the team promoted to the top flight and stayed there for a record three years.

Arias left on 15 June 2009, in order to take the same position in a two-year spell at UD Las Palmas. On 21 April 2017 he replaced Monchi as the director of football of Sevilla FC, having previously joined the club in 2013; in September 2018, still in that capacity, he signed with neighbouring Cádiz CF.
