= Juanjo González =

Spanish footballer and manager

Personal information
- Full name: Juan José González Argüelles
- Date of birth: 9 October 1973 (age 53)
- Place of birth: Gijón, Spain
- Height: 1.83 m (6 ft 0 in)
- Position: Goalkeeper

Youth career
- Sporting Gijón

Senior career*
Years	Team	Apps	(Gls)
1993–1994	Gijón Industrial		
1994–1997	Sporting B	61	(0)
1995–2003	Sporting Gijón	68	(0)
2003–2004	Linares	25	(0)

International career
2000	Asturias	1	(0)

Managerial career
- 2005–2006: Langreo
- 2007–2008: Llanes
- 2008–2011: Racing Santander (assistant)
- 2011–2012: Racing Santander
- 2013: Avilés
- * Club domestic league appearances and goals

Juan José González Argüelles (born 9 October 1973), known as Juanjo, is a Spanish retired footballer who played as a goalkeeper, and manager.

== Career ==
Born in Gijón, Asturias, Juanjo spent most of his playing career with hometown club Sporting de Gijón, making 77 total appearances including 14 in La Liga early on. He began his managerial career in Tercera División with UP Langreo and CD Llanes.

On 11 November 2009, Juanjo and fellow assistant Fede Castaños managed Racing de Santander in the second leg of their last-16 tie with UD Salamanca following the dismissal of Juan Carlos Mandiá, winning 4–1 at home for a 4–2 aggregate win.

In late November 2011, Hector Cúper was dismissed from Racing, who were last place in the topflight with nine points. To save money in the club that was administration, three current employees were promoted to manager – Juanjo, Castaños and Pablo Pinillos. Juanjo alone was sacked the following March.

Juanjo returned to football in early February 2013 with Real Avilés of Segunda División B. In May, having avoided relegation with a late run of form, his deal was not renewed.
