= Pedro Braojos =

Spanish footballer and manager

Personal information
- Full name: Pedro Pablo Braojos de Santiago
- Date of birth: 8 January 1957 (age 69)
- Place of birth: Toledo, Spain
- Height: 1.82 m (6 ft 0 in)
- Position: Forward

Youth career
- Atlético Madrid

Senior career*
Years	Team	Apps	(Gls)
1976–1981	Atlético Madrileño		
1981–1982	Lorca	20	(2)
1982–1983	Huesca	37	(9)
1983–1985	Oviedo	35	(4)
1985–1987	Granada	59	(7)
1987–1989	Linense	19	(0)
1989–1990	Villarrobledo		

Managerial career
- 1996: Toledo (interim)
- 1997: Almería
- 1997–1998: Leganés
- 1999–2000: Sporting Gijón
- 2000–2001: Jaén
- 2001: Murcia
- 2005–2008: Linares
- 2008–2009: Granada
- 2010: Almería B
- 2011–2012: Cacereño
- * Club domestic league appearances and goals

Pedro Pablo Braojos de Santiago (born 8 January 1957) is a Spanish retired footballer who played as a forward, and a current manager.

== Club career ==
Braojos was born in Toledo, Castile-La Mancha. An Atlético Madrid's youth graduate, he only appeared with the B-side in Segunda División B and Segunda División; he made his debut in the latter competition on 7 September 1980, starting and scoring his side's only goal in a 1–1 away draw against Racing de Santander.

After two years in the third level appearing for Lorca Deportiva CF and SD Huesca, Braojos joined Real Oviedo in the second division in the 1983 summer. He only appeared sparingly for the Asturians, and subsequently resumed his career in the lower leagues, representing Granada CF, Real Balompédica Linense and CP Villarrobledo; he retired with the latter in 1990, aged 33.

== Managerial career ==
After being an interim manager at second level's CD Toledo in 1996, Braojos was appointed manager of fellow league team UD Almería in the following year, remaining in charge for 14 matches and suffering team relegation. He subsequently achieved mid-table positions in the following five campaigns, while in charge of CD Leganés, Sporting de Gijón, Real Jaén and Real Murcia.

In 2005 Braojos was named CD Linares manager. He led the club to three consecutive play-offs, but failed to achieve promotion in any of them.

On 16 October 2008 Braojos was appointed at the helm of Granada CF, in the third division. He left the club at the end of his contract, and remained two further years without any club.

On 14 June 2011 Braojos was appointed CP Cacereño manager. After finishing 7th, nine points shy of the play-offs, he left the club.
