= Mario Cotelo =

Spanish footballer

Personal information
- Full name: Mario Gutiérrez Cotelo
- Date of birth: 10 February 1975 (age 51)
- Place of birth: La Felguera, Spain
- Height: 1.81 m (5 ft 11 1/2 in)
- Position: Midfielder

Youth career
- Sporting Gijón

Senior career*
Years	Team	Apps	(Gls)
1993–1996	Sporting Gijón B	75	(6)
1993–2001	Sporting Gijón	148	(10)
1996–1997	→ Badajoz (loan)	36	(1)
2001–2002	Sevilla	5	(0)
2003	Las Palmas	18	(1)
2003–2009	Getafe	142	(5)
Total		424	(23)

International career
2000–2002	Asturias	3	(1)
- * Club domestic league appearances and goals

Mario Gutiérrez Cotelo (born 10 February 1975) is a Spanish former professional footballer who played as a right midfielder.

He amassed La Liga totals of 168 games and six goals over ten seasons, representing in the competition Sporting de Gijón, Sevilla and Getafe.

== Club career ==
Born in La Felguera, Asturias, Cotelo began his career at local Sporting de Gijón, and played for their reserves in his first two seasons as a senior. In 1993–94 he appeared once for the main squad and, following a loan at Segunda División side CD Badajoz, would become an important player with the latter.

After four full seasons with Gijón, Cotelo returned to La Liga with Sevilla FC, but would only appear five times for the Andalusians over one and a half campaigns, moving to UD Las Palmas in January 2003. In 2003–04 he was a key element in Getafe CF's first-ever promotion to the top flight, and went on to total 93 league games the following three years.

Used sparingly throughout 2007–08, Cotelo also played six incomplete UEFA Cup matches in the Madrid side's quarter-final run. In the next season he featured even less (five minutes of action), and was subsequently released.

Not being able to find a new club, Cotelo retired from the game in early 2010, at the age of 35. He totalled 349 appearances in the country's two major divisions.

On 20 August 2015, Cotelo returned to Sporting to work as a match delegate.
