= Salvador Capín =

Spanish footballer

Personal information
- Full name: Salvador Capín Martino
- Date of birth: March 14, 1975 (age 51)
- Place of birth: Gijón, Spain
- Height: 1.76 m (5 ft 9 1/2 in)
- Position: Midfielder

Senior career*
Years	Team	Apps	(Gls)
1997–2000	Sporting Gijón	34	(0)
2000	Airdrieonians	14	(1)
2001	Raith Rovers	7	(0)
2001–2002	Poli Ejido	4	(0)
2002–2003	Huesca		
2003	Universidad Las Palmas		
2004	Livingston	2	(0)
2004	Raith Rovers	12	(0)
2005–2006	Motril		
2006–2010	Ceares	120	(9)
- * Club domestic league appearances and goals

Salvador Capín Martino (born March 14, 1975, in Gijón), known as Salvador Capín, is a retired Spanish professional football player.

He spent a large amount of his professional career in Scotland, playing for Airdrieonians, Raith Rovers (twice) and Livingston. His only goal in Scottish football came when playing for Airdrieonians in a 5–1 win over Morton.

== Honours ==
Airdrieonians

- Scottish Challenge Cup: 2000–01
