= Sergio Fernández (footballer, born 1977) =

Spanish footballer

Sergio
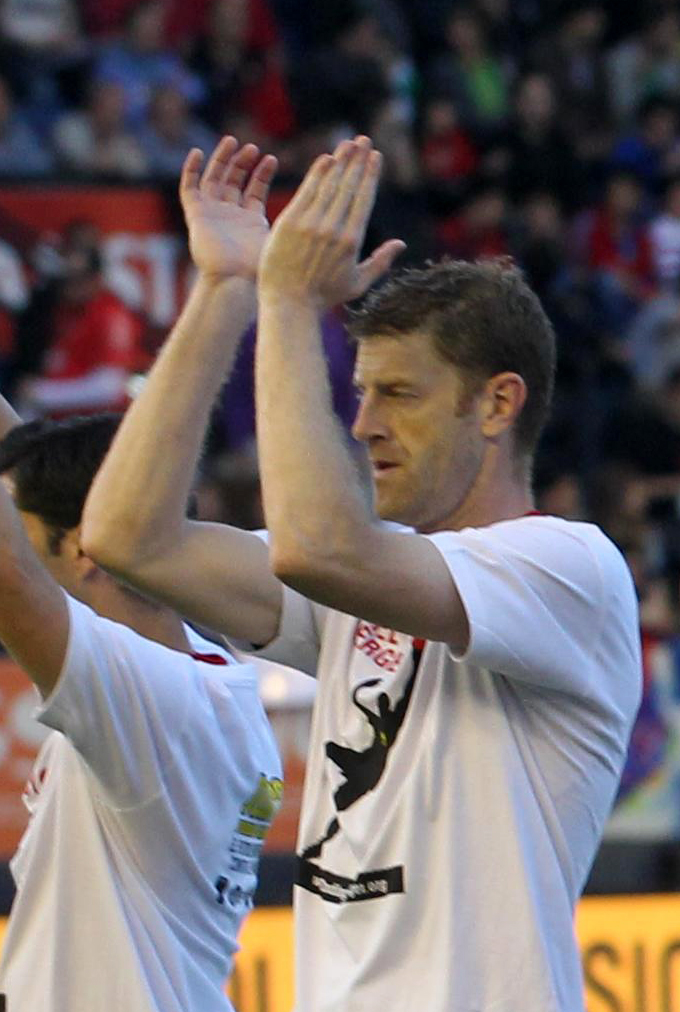
- Sergio in the 2012 European Match Day Against Hunger

Personal information
- Full name: Sergio Fernández González
- Date of birth: 23 May 1977 (age 49)
- Place of birth: Avilés, Spain
- Height: 1.91 m (6 ft 3 in)
- Position: Centre-back

Youth career
- 1992–1994: Sporting Gijón

Senior career*
| Years | Team | Apps | (Gls) |
| 1994–1996 | Sporting Gijón B | 51 | (2) |
| 1996–1999 | Sporting Gijón | 84 | (2) |
| 1999–2006 | Celta | 130 | (4) |
| 2006–2008 | Zaragoza | 55 | (1) |
| 2008–2012 | Osasuna | 81 | (4) |
| 2012 | Sporting Gijón | 1 | (0) |
| Total | | 402 | (13) |

International career
| 1997–2000 | Spain U21 | 12 | (0) |
- * Club domestic league appearances and goals

Sergio Fernández González (born 23 May 1977), known simply as Sergio, is a Spanish former professional footballer who played as a central defender.

In 18 years as a senior, he played mainly for Celta and Osasuna, starting and ending his career with Sporting de Gijón. He appeared in 295 La Liga matches over 15 seasons, scoring nine goals.

== Club career ==
Sergio was born in Avilés, Asturias, and emerged through Sporting de Gijón's youth system, making his first appearance for the main squad on 7 January 1996 in a 3–2 home win against UD Salamanca. He would play three further seasons as first choice, with the club being relegated from La Liga in 1998.

Sergio joined RC Celta de Vigo in the summer of 1999, being a somewhat important defensive figure in the Galicians' domestic and European consolidation. After relegation at the end of the 2003–04 campaign (19 games played), he contributed one goal in a 2–1 home victory over Xerez CD on 9 January 2005 as the side eventually returned to the top division, and continued to appear prominently as they immediately achieved a UEFA Cup position.

Sergio moved to Real Zaragoza for 2006–07, reuniting with former Celta manager Víctor Fernández and teammate Juanfran and playing 28 matches en route to another sixth place in the league, which again qualified for the UEFA Cup. However, in spite of his late equaliser against Real Madrid on 11 May 2008, in a 2–2 home draw, the Aragonese were relegated at the end of his second year.

In mid-November 2008, Sergio signed with CA Osasuna until the end of the top-flight season, as the Navarrese lost Rovérsio for its duration due to a serious knee injury in a Copa del Rey tie against Getafe CF. He received the Brazilian's No. 16 jersey.

The veteran continued to be regularly used the following years, under both José Antonio Camacho and his successor José Luis Mendilibar. On 6 March 2011, he headed home a 92nd-minute corner kick in a 1–0 away defeat of Málaga CF in what was his team's first away win of the campaign.

On 20 June 2012, after having scored once from 20 appearances to help Osasuna retain their league status, the 35-year-old Sergio signed for two years with his former employers Sporting, in turn relegated to the Segunda División. Only four months later, however, he decided to retire due to a chronic injury.
