= Borja Sánchez (footballer, born 1978) =

Spanish footballer

Personal information
- Full name: Borja Sánchez Luque
- Date of birth: 12 April 1978 (age 48)
- Place of birth: Lada, Spain
- Height: 1.83 m (6 ft 0 in)
- Position: Left back

Youth career
- Sporting Gijón

Senior career*
| Years | Team | Apps | (Gls) |
| 1996–2002 | Sporting B | 97 | (0) |
| 1997–1998 | → Lealtad (loan) | | |
| 1999–2002 | Sporting Gijón | 10 | (0) |
| 2002–2003 | Eibar | 0 | (0) |
| 2002–2003 | → Orihuela (loan) | 12 | (0) |
| 2003–2004 | Burgos | 7 | (1) |
| 2004–2006 | Oviedo | 25 | (0) |
| 2006–2007 | Huesca | 35 | (0) |
| 2007–2008 | Lleida | 7 | (1) |
| 2008–2009 | Lealtad | | |
| 2009–2010 | Cudillero | | |
| 2010–2011 | Tuilla | | |
- * Club domestic league appearances and goals

Borja Sánchez Luque (born 12 April 1978) is a Spanish former footballer who played as a left back.

== Football career ==
Born in Lada (Langreo), Sánchez emerged through local giants Sporting de Gijón's youth system, but could only amass ten appearances for its first team, in four separate second division seasons.

Finally released in 2002, he resumed his career in the third level, representing in quick succession in Orihuela CF, Burgos CF, Real Oviedo, SD Huesca and UE Lleida. In 2008, already in his 30s, Sánchez dropped down to division four – he had already played one season in the category with Oviedo, winning the championship – and returned to his native Asturias, also appearing for several clubs.

== Honours ==
Lealtad

- Tercera División: 1997–98

Oviedo

- Tercera División: 2004–05
