= Mingo (footballer) =

Spanish footballer

Personal information
- Full name: Carles Domingo Pladevall
- Date of birth: 10 June 1977 (age 49)
- Place of birth: Hostalric, Spain
- Height: 1.77 m (5 ft 10 in)
- Position: Left back

Youth career
- Barcelona

Senior career*
Years	Team	Apps	(Gls)
1994–1995	Barcelona C		
1995–1997	Barcelona B	43	(1)
1997–2000	Sporting Gijón	99	(2)
2000–2001	Rayo Vallecano	33	(0)
2001–2004	Betis	47	(1)
2004–2006	Albacete	43	(0)
2006–2012	Gimnàstic	148	(0)
Total		413	(4)

International career
1992–1993	Spain U16	6	(0)
1993–1995	Spain U18	17	(2)
1995	Spain U19	2	(0)
1995	Spain U20	3	(0)
1997	Spain U23	3	(0)
- * Club domestic league appearances and goals

Carles Domingo Pladevall (born 10 June 1977), known as Mingo, is a Spanish former professional footballer who played as a left back.

A FC Barcelona youth product, he appeared in 279 Segunda División matches over 11 seasons, mainly with Gimnàstic (five years) and Barcelona B (three). He added in 134 and one goal in La Liga, where he represented the former club and also Sporting de Gijón, Rayo Vallecano, Betis and Albacete.

== Club career ==
Born in Hostalric, Girona, Catalonia, Mingo began his football career in FC Barcelona's youth system. Playing alongside Albert Celades and Iván de la Peña, he won the 1994 División de Honor and the Copa del Rey Juvenil; already a senior, he spent three seasons with the club's B-team.

Mingo was released in the summer of 1997, moving to Sporting de Gijón and making his La Liga debut that season as the Asturias side were finally relegated. After two seasons he returned to the top flight with Rayo Vallecano, where his good performances attracted attention from Real Betis, with a good first campaign being followed by two subpar ones (in his last year, however, he scored his first goal in the top level, a 2–1 away win against RCD Espanyol on 25 January 2004).

In 2004, Mingo moved to Albacete Balompié, playing one season each in the first and second divisions – in his second year, he was sent off three times. In 2006–07 he returned to his region of birth, signing with Gimnàstic de Tarragona and appearing in 16 league games in a season that ended in top-tier relegation.

Veteran Mingo was regularly used by Nàstic in the following four second division campaigns, featuring in a minimum of 21 and a maximum of 29 league matches. He was released at the end of 2011–12, with the club suffering relegation.

== Honours ==
Spain U18

- UEFA European Under-18 Championship: 1995
