= Rubén Suárez =

Spanish footballer

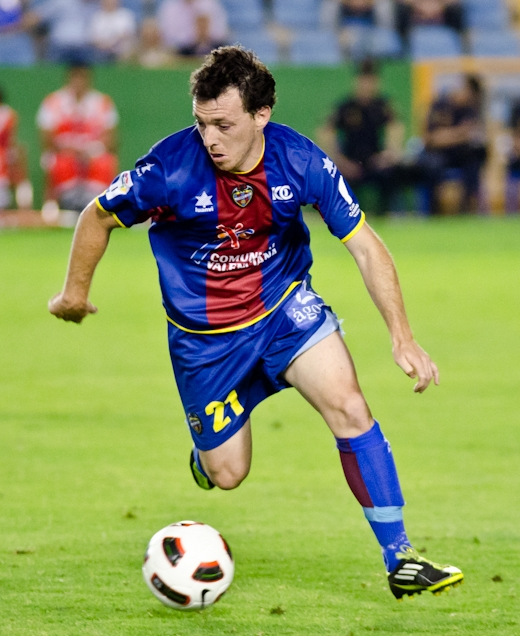
- Suárez in action for Levante in 2011

Personal information
- Full name: Rubén Suárez Estrada
- Date of birth: 19 February 1979 (age 47)
- Place of birth: Gijón, Spain
- Height: 1.67 m (5 ft 5 1/2 in)
- Position: Attacking midfielder

Youth career
- Sporting Gijón

Senior career*
Years	Team	Apps	(Gls)
1997–2002	Sporting Gijón B	77	(25)
1998–2004	Sporting Gijón	104	(11)
2004–2008	Elche	93	(13)
2008–2012	Levante	127	(37)
2012–2013	Guizhou Renhe	13	(1)
2013	Almería	19	(1)
2013–2014	Skoda Xanthi	14	(0)
2014–2015	Castellón	38	(16)
2015–2016	Torrevieja	25	(5)
2016–2017	Torre Levante	35	(9)
2017–2019	Acero	26	(1)
2019–2020	Soneja	20	(1)
Total		591	(120)

International career
1997–1998	Spain U18	5	(0)
1998–1999	Spain U20	12	(1)
1999	Spain U21	1	(0)
Medal record
Representing Spain
Men's football
FIFA World Youth Championship
Winner	1999 Nigeria
- * Club domestic league appearances and goals

Rubén Suárez Estrada (Spanish pronunciation: [ruˈβen ˈswaɾeθ]; born 19 February 1979) is a Spanish former professional footballer. Mainly an attacking midfielder, he could also play as a second striker.

He appeared in 283 Segunda División matches over 13 seasons, totalling 49 goals for Sporting de Gijón, Elche, Levante and Almería. He added 61 games and 13 goals in La Liga with the two last clubs, and also represented clubs in China and Greece.

== Club career ==
Born in Gijón, and a product of local Sporting de Gijón's famed youth academy, Mareo, Suárez played six seasons with the Asturians' first team in the Segunda División. He stayed in that league afterwards, with four additional years at Elche CF.

Suárez joined Levante UD in the same division on 31 July 2008, on a two-year contract. In his first year he finished as the side's top scorer at 12, mainly due to the serious fibula injury to Alexandre Geijo.

In the 2009–10 season, Suárez repeated the feat (again netting in double digits), as the Valencians returned to La Liga after a two-year absence. On 28 August 2010, at the age of 31 years, six months and nine days, he made his debut in the top division, opening the score at home against Sevilla FC through a penalty kick, in an eventual 4–1 defeat.

In late June 2012, aged 33, Suárez had his first adventure abroad, signing with Chinese Super League club Guizhou Renhe F.C. and reuniting with former Levante teammates Rafa Jordà and Nano, after contributing eight goals in less than 1,000 minutes of play to Levante's first-ever qualification for the UEFA Europa League after a sixth-place finish in the league.

Suárez returned to his country on 3 January 2013, signing with second-tier UD Almería for 18 months.

== International career ==
Suárez played all the matches for Spain at the 1999 FIFA World Youth Championship held in Nigeria, scoring in a 3–1 group stage win against Honduras – the only game where he did not appear from the bench – as the national team won the tournament. Later that year, he earned one cap for the under-21s.

== Personal life ==
Suárez's father, Secundino, was also a footballer. A defender, he too played for Sporting Gijón.

== Honours ==
Spain U20

- FIFA World Youth Championship: 1999
