= Miguel López-Cedrón =

Spanish footballer (born 1978)

Miguel
Personal information
- Full name: Miguel Ángel López-Cedrón Freije
- Date of birth: 3 June 1978 (age 48)
- Place of birth: Oviedo, Spain
- Height: 1.95 m (6 ft 5 in)
- Position: Centre-forward

Youth career
- 1989–1990: Llanera
- 1990–1996: Sporting Gijón
- 1992–1993: → Veriña (loan)

Senior career*
Years	Team	Apps	(Gls)
1996–2000	Sporting Gijón B	134	(38)
1998–2004	Sporting Gijón	54	(10)
2000–2001	→ Leganés (loan)	25	(4)
2002–2003	→ Eibar (loan)	31	(6)
2004–2006	Numancia	40	(6)
2006–2009	Elche	84	(19)
2009–2011	Oviedo	53	(7)
2011–2013	Avilés	64	(13)
2013–2014	Tuilla	35	(14)
2014–2015	Llanes	16	(0)
Total		536	(117)
- * Club domestic league appearances and goals

Miguel Ángel López-Cedrón Freije (born 3 June 1978), known simply as Miguel as a player, is a Spanish former professional footballer who played as a centre-forward.

== Playing career ==
Born in Oviedo, Asturias, Miguel's career was mainly associated with Sporting de Gijón, being however mainly registered with the reserves during his eight-year tenure. He made his La Liga debut with the first team on 26 April 1998, coming on as a 57th-minute substitute in a 4–0 away loss against UD Salamanca.

Miguel amassed Segunda División totals of 213 matches and 40 goals over ten seasons, representing in the competition Sporting, CD Leganés, SD Eibar, CD Numancia – for which he also appeared in the top flight, in 2004–05– and Elche CF. His last two years were spent in the Tercera División, with CD Tuilla and CD Llanes.

== Post-retirement ==
After retiring, López-Cedrón joined amateurs UD Llanera as director of football. On 26 June 2019, he was named president of the club.
