= Dmitri Cheryshev =

Russian football manager (born 1969)

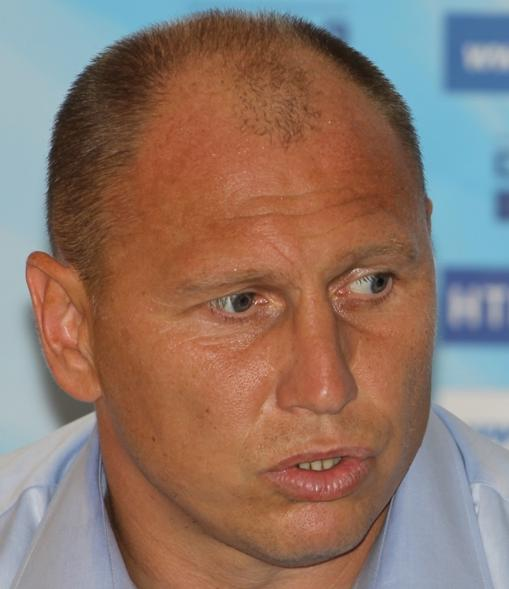
- Cheryshev in 2011

Personal information
- Full name: Dmitri Nikolayevich Cheryshev
- Date of birth: 11 May 1969 (age 57)
- Place of birth: Gorky, Russian SFSR, Soviet Union
- Height: 1.69 m (5 ft 7 in)
- Position: Forward

Team information
- Current team: Ravshan Kulob (manager)

Youth career
- Torpedo Gorky

Senior career*
| Years | Team | Apps | (Gls) |
| 1987–1988 | Khimik | 15 | (2) |
| 1990–1992 | Lokomotiv Nizhny Novgorod | 79 | (14) |
| 1993–1996 | Dynamo Moscow | 104 | (37) |
| 1996–2001 | Sporting Gijón | 158 | (47) |
| 2001–2002 | Burgos | 23 | (1) |
| 2002–2003 | Aranjuez | | |
| Total | | 379 | (101) |

International career
| 1992 | CIS | 3 | (0) |
| 1994–1998 | Russia | 10 | (1) |

Managerial career
- 2003: Aranjuez (player-coach)
- 2006–2010: Real Madrid (youth)
- 2011–2012: Volga Nizhny Novgorod
- 2013–2014: Zenit St. Petersburg (U19)
- 2014–2015: Irtysh Pavlodar
- 2015–2016: Sevilla (assistant)
- 2016–2017: Mordovia Saransk
- 2018–2019: Nizhny Novgorod
- 2021: AFC Eskilstuna
- 2022–2023: Santa Coloma
- 2023–2024: Shinnik Yaroslavl
- 2024–: Ravshan Kulob
- * Club domestic league appearances and goals

Dmitri Nikolayevich Cheryshev (Russian: Дми́трий Никола́евич Че́рышев; born 11 May 1969) is a Russian professional football manager and a former forward. He is the manager of Tajikistani club Ravshan Kulob.

During his 16-year senior career, he was mainly associated with Dynamo Moscow (four seasons) and Sporting de Gijón (five). He was nicknamed the Bullet from Gorki, due to his speed.

== Club career ==
Born in Gorky, Russian Soviet Federative Socialist Republic, Soviet Union, Cheryshev began his professional career with Khimik Dzerzhinsk in the third division, joining Lokomotiv Nizhny Novgorod in the second level in 1990. He played four seasons in the Russian Premier League with Dynamo Moscow, helping the capital club to two top-three finishes and winning the 1995 Russian Cup.

In 1996, Cheryshev scored a career-best 17 goals with Dynamo, who eventually finished fourth. Subsequently, he moved to Spain and signed for Sporting de Gijón, where he would share teams with several compatriots; he made his debut in La Liga on 17 November 1996, playing 30 minutes in a 2–4 home loss against Athletic Bilbao– the Asturians would be relegated at the end of the 1997–98 season.

Cheryshev continued to net regularly for Sporting in his division two spell. He ended his career also in the country, after one-season stints with Burgos (second tier) and Real Aranjuez (amateurs).

== International career ==
Cheryshev made his debut for CIS on 25 January 1992, in a friendly with the United States. During four years he was also capped for Russia, scoring his only international goal in a UEFA Euro 1996 qualifier against San Marino.

== Coaching career ==
Cheryshev worked as a manager with Real Madrid during two years, being in charge of one of its children's teams. After acting briefly as director of football with Sibir Novosibirsk, he was appointed head coach at Volga Nizhny Novgorod, helping the team narrowly retain their top-flight status.

In late October 2014, Cheryshev was appointed as manager of Kazakhstan Premier League side Irtysh Pavlodar on a two-year contract. He was relieved of his duties in May of the following year, being immediately signed to Unai Emery's staff at Sevilla.

On 3 June 2016, Cheryshev was named coach of Mordovia Saransk, recently relegated from the Premier League. Ahead of the 2018–19 season he was hired by Nizhny Novgorod, leading them to the promotion play-offs but losing to Krylia Sovetov Samara. On 16 October 2019, he left by mutual consent.

On 21 September 2021, Cheryshev was named head coach of AFC Eskilstuna in Sweden, he was their coach for three hours until he left his first and only training - the barrier of language was a big problem and he felt he couldn't change that much in the club as he wanted.

On 9 August 2022, Cheryshev was hired as the manager of Santa Coloma in Andorra. Under his management, Santa Coloma became the first Andorran club to win two qualifying rounds in UEFA competition (2023–24 UEFA Europa Conference League).

== Personal life ==
Cheryshev's son, Denis, is also a footballer. A winger, he played youth football for two of the teams his father represented in Spain, and also spent several seasons with Real Madrid.

== Career statistics ==
=== Club ===
Appearances and goals by club, season and competition
| Club | Season | League | | |
| Club | Season | Division | Apps | Goals |
|---|---|---|---|---|
| Khimik Dzerzhinsk | 1987 | Second League | 15 | 2 |
| Khimik Dzerzhinsk | 1989 | Second League | | 0 |
| Lokomotiv Nizhny Novgorod | 1990 | Soviet First League | 27 | 3 |
| Lokomotiv Nizhny Novgorod | 1991 | First League | 34 | 7 |
| Lokomotiv Nizhny Novgorod | 1992 | Russian Premier League | 18 | 4 |
| Dynamo Moscow | 1993 | Russian Premier League | 22 | 7 |
| Dynamo Moscow | 1994 | Russian Premier League | 24 | 8 |
| Dynamo Moscow | 1995 | Russian Premier League | 27 | 5 |
| Dynamo Moscow | 1996 | Russian Premier League | 31 | 17 |
| Sporting Gijón | 1996–97 | La Liga | 28 | 8 |
| Sporting Gijón | 1997–98 | La Liga | 27 | 6 |
| Sporting Gijón | 1998–99 | Segunda División | 36 | 13 |
| Sporting Gijón | 1999–2000 | Segunda División | 30 | 13 |
| Sporting Gijón | 2000–01 | Segunda División | 37 | 7 |
| Burgos | 2001–02 | Segunda División | 23 | 1 |

=== International ===
| # | Date | Venue | Opponent | Score | Result | Competition |
|---|---|---|---|---|---|---|
| 1 | 7 June 1995 | Stadio Olimpico, Serravalle, San Marino | San Marino | 0–7 | 0–7 | Euro 1996 qualifying |

== Managerial statistics ==
As of match played 13 April 2024

Managerial record by team and tenure
| Team | Nat | From | To | Record | | | | | | | |
| Team | Nat | From | To | G | W | D | L | GF | GA | GD | Win % |
|---|---|---|---|---|---|---|---|---|---|---|---|
| Volga Nizhny Novgorod | (Russia) | 16 June 2011 | 30 June 2012 | 38 | 11 | 6 | 21 | 30 | 52 | −22 | 28.95 |
| Irtysh Pavlodar | (Kazakhstan) | 27 October 2014 | 8 May 2015 | 13 | 2 | 5 | 6 | 14 | 17 | −3 | 15.38 |
| Mordovia Saransk | (Russia) | 3 June 2016 | 30 January 2017 | 26 | 7 | 4 | 15 | 27 | 39 | −12 | 26.92 |
| Nizhny Novgorod | (Russia) | 8 July 2018 | 16 October 2019 | 62 | 27 | 15 | 20 | 63 | 55 | +8 | 43.55 |
| AFC Eskilstuna | (Sweden) | 21 September 2021 | 21 September 2021 | 0 | 0 | 0 | 0 | 0 | 0 | +0 | — |
| Santa Coloma | (Andorra) | 22 July 2022 | 19 November 2023 | 42 | 23 | 9 | 10 | 80 | 29 | +51 | 54.76 |
| Shinnik Yaroslavl | (Russia) | 22 December 2023 | Present | 6 | 3 | 1 | 2 | 5 | 3 | +2 | 50.00 |
| Total | | | | 187 | 73 | 40 | 74 | 219 | 195 | +24 | 39.04 |

== Honours ==
Dynamo Moscow

- Russian Cup: 1994–95

Individual

- Top 33 players year-end list: 1992, 1994, 1996
