= Isma Piñera =

Spanish footballer and manager

Personal information
- Full name: Ismael Piñera Zapatero
- Date of birth: 27 May 1977 (age 49)
- Place of birth: Gijón, Spain
- Height: 1.92 m (6 ft 4 in)
- Position: Defender

Youth career
- Colegio Inmaculada
- Sporting Gijón
- 1993–1994: Gijón Industrial

Senior career*
| Years | Team | Apps | (Gls) |
| 1994–1998 | Sporting B | 33 | (0) |
| 1996–1997 | → Candás | | |
| 1997–2005 | Sporting Gijón | 102 | (4) |
| 2005–2006 | Racing de Ferrol | 10 | (0) |
| Total | | 145 | (4) |

Managerial career
- 2015–2016: Sporting B (assistant)
- 2016: Sporting B (interim)
- 2016–2018: Sporting Gijón U-19
- 2018–2019: Sporting B
- * Club domestic league appearances and goals

Ismael "Isma" Piñera Zapatero (born 27 May 1977 in Gijón) is a Spanish retired footballer, who was most recently the manager of Sporting de Gijón B.

== Playing career ==
Isma Piñera began his career with affiliate clubs to Sporting de Gijón, while studying at the Colegio de la Inmaculada. He spent a short spell with Candás, before making his Sporting debut on 12 November 1997, in a 0-1 loss to Mérida.

He spent the majority of his career with Sporting, before a serious injury sustained in 2002 sidelined him for over 2 years. On his return, it was deemed his performances were not of a high enough quality, and he was sold to lower division side Racing de Ferrol.

== Coaching career ==
Isma currently works as a coach for Sporting de Gijón B. In July 2015, he was appointed assistant manager to Tomás Hervás, and in April 2016, he became interim manager for the Segunda División B side after Hervás was sacked. His time as manager was short lived, as José Alberto López was appointed in June 2016.

On 5 May 2018, Isma finished runner-up of the Copa de Campeones with Sporting's under-19 team.

On 18 November 2018, Isma came back to the reserve team after the appointment of José Alberto López as manager of the first team. However, he was sacked on 18 March 2019 after earning only 9 of the 48 points played, dropping the team from the fifth to the thirteenth position.

== Managerial statistics ==
As of 16 March 2019

Managerial record by team and tenure
| Team | Nat | From | To | Record | | | | | | | | Ref |
| Team | Nat | From | To | G | W | D | L | GF | GA | GD | Win % | Ref |
|---|---|---|---|---|---|---|---|---|---|---|---|---|
| Sporting Gijón B (interim) | (Spain) | 6 April 2016 | 9 June 2016 | 6 | 2 | 2 | 2 | 6 | 4 | +2 | 33.33 | |
| Sporting Gijón B | (Spain) | 18 November 2018 | 18 March 2019 | 16 | 2 | 3 | 11 | 11 | 27 | −16 | 12.50 | |
| Total | | | | 22 | 4 | 5 | 13 | 17 | 31 | −14 | 18.18 | — |
