= 2016–17 Sporting de Gijón season =

Real Sporting
2016–17 season
- President: Javier Fernández
- Manager: Rubi
- Stadium: El Molinón
- La Liga: 18th (relegated)
- Copa del Rey: Round of 32
- Top goalscorer: League: All: Duje Čop (9 goals)
- Highest home attendance: 25,899; Real Sporting 0–5 Barcelona (24 September 2016)
- Lowest home attendance: 15,365; Real Sporting 2–2 Real Betis (20 May 2017)
- Average home league attendance: 22,594
Home colours	Away colours

The 2016–17 season was Sporting de Gijón's 111th season in existence and the club's 42nd season in the top flight of Spanish football. It covered a period from 1 July 2016 to 30 June 2017.

== Season overview ==
Despite earning seven points in the first three games, a streak of five losses dropped Real Sporting to the relegation positions. The club was unable to leave them during the rest of the season and finally was relegated to Segunda División despite winning 1–0 at Ipurua.

== Players ==
=== Current squad ===
N	Pos.	Nat.	Name	Age	Since	App	Goals	Ends	Transfer fee	Notes
1	GK	(Spain)	Iván Cuéllar (vice-captain)	33	2008	133	0	2019	Free	
2	DF	(Brazil)	Douglas	26	2016	0	0	2017	Loan	
3	DF	(Martinique)	Jean-Sylvain Babin	30	2016	0	0	2019	Free	Played internationally with Martinique
4	DF	(Spain)	Jorge Meré	20	2015	31	0	2020	Youth system	
5	DF	(Venezuela)	Fernando Amorebieta	32	2016	0	0	2020	Undisclosed	Second nationality: Spain
6	MF	(Spain)	Sergio Álvarez	25	2013	82	5	2021	Youth system	
7	MF	(Spain)	Víctor Rodríguez	27	2016	0	0	2020	Youth system	
8	FW	(Ivory Coast)	Lacina Traoré	26	2017	0	0	2017	Loan	
9	FW	(Spain)	Carlos Castro	22	2014	30	9	2018	Youth system	
10	MF	(Spain)	Nacho Cases	29	2011	133	7	2018	Youth system	
11	DF	(Spain)	Alberto Lora (captain)	30	2007	209	8	2018	Youth system	
12	DF	(Nigeria)	Elderson Echiéjilé	29	2017	0	0	2017	Loan	
13	GK	(Spain)	Diego Mariño	27	2016	0	0	2020	Undisclosed	
14	MF	(Spain)	Burgui	23	2016	0	0	2017	Loan	
15	FW	(Spain)	Roberto Canella	29	2008	225	6	2019	Youth system	
16	DF	(Spain)	Lillo	28	2016	0	0	2018	Free	
17	FW	(Qatar)	Akram Afif	20	2016	0	0	2017	Loan	
18	DF	(Spain)	Isma López	27	2013	44	6	2019	Free	
19	MF	(Spain)	Carlos Carmona	29	2012	103	13	2019	Free	
20	MF	(Cameroon)	Dani Ndi	21	2015	27	2	2018	Youth system	
21	MF	(Spain)	Xavi Torres	30	2016	0	0	2017	Free	Played two games with number 25
22	MF	(Spain)	Mikel Vesga	24	2017	0	0	2017	Loan	
23	MF	(Spain)	Moi Gómez	23	2016	0	0	2020	Free	
24	FW	(Croatia)	Duje Čop	27	2016	0	0	2017	Loan	
25	FW	(Spain)	Borja Viguera	30	2016	0	0	2018	Free	
30	GK	(Spain)	Óscar Whalley	23	2016	0	0	2018	Free	

- Last updated: 31 January 2017
- Source: Ages as of 30 June 2017. Stats updated as of the end of the 2015–16 season. Only league and playoff games included.
- Ordered by squad number.

=== From the reserve team ===
Note: Flags indicate national team as defined under FIFA eligibility rules; some limited exceptions apply. Players may hold more than one non-FIFA nationality.

No.	Pos.	Nation	Player
26	FW	ESP	Pablo Fernández
29	DF	ESP	Juan Rodríguez
31	FW	ESP	Rubén
33	MF	ESP	Cristian

=== In ===
No.	Pos.	Nat.	Name	Age	Moving from	Type	Transfer window	Ends	Transfer fee	Source
7	MF	(Spain)	Víctor Rodríguez	26	Getafe (Note: On loan from Elche.)	Free	Summer	2020	Free	
13	GK	(Spain)	Diego Mariño	26	Levante	Free	Summer	2020	Undisclosed	
16	DF	(Spain)	Lillo	27	Eibar	Free	Summer	2019	Free	
23	MF	(Spain)	Moi Gómez	22	Getafe (Note: On loan from Villarreal.)	Free	Summer	2020	Free	
14	MF	(Spain)	Burgui	22	Espanyol (Note: On loan from Real Madrid.)	Loan	Summer	2017	Free	
5	DF	(Venezuela)	Fernando Amorebieta	31	Fulham (England)	Transfer	Summer	2019	Undisclosed	
20	FW	(Croatia)	Duje Čop	26	Cagliari (Italy)	Loan	Summer	2017	Free	
3	DF	(Martinique)	Jean-Sylvain Babin	29	Granada	Transfer	Summer	2019	Free	
17	MF	(Qatar)	Akram Afif	19	Villarreal (Note: Last season played in Eupen)	Loan	Summer	2017	Free	
30	GK	(Spain)	Óscar Whalley	22	Zaragoza	Transfer	Summer	2018	Free	
21	MF	(Spain)	Xavi Torres	29	Real Betis	Transfer	Summer	2017	Free	
2	DF	(Brazil)	Douglas	26	Barcelona	Loan	Summer	2017	Free	
25	FW	(Spain)	Borja Viguera	29	Athletic Bilbao	Transfer	Summer	2018	Free	
22	MF	(Spain)	Mikel Vesga	23	Athletic Bilbao	Loan	Winter	2017	Free	
8	FW	(Ivory Coast)	Lacina Traoré	26	Monaco (France) (Note: Previouslay loaned to CSKA Moscow)	Loan	Winter	2017	Free	
12	DF	(Nigeria)	Elderson Echiéjilé	29	Monaco (France) (Note: Previouslay loaned to Standard Liège)	Loan	Winter	2017	Free	

=== Out ===
No.	Pos.	Nat.	Name	Age	Moving to	Type	Transfer window	Transfer fee	Source
2	DF	(Spain)	Luis Hernández	27	Leicester City (England)	End of contract	Summer	Free	
23	MF	(Spain)	Jony	24	Málaga	End of contract	Summer	Free	
17	MF	(Spain)	Omar Mascarell	23	Eintracht Frankfurt (Germany)	Loan return (Note: Loan return to Real Madrid, later transferred)	Summer	Free	
20	FW	(Paraguay)	Antonio Sanabria	19	Betis	Loan return (Note: Loan return to Roma, later transferred)	Summer	Free	
25	MF	(Croatia)	Alen Halilović	20	Hamburger SV (Germany)	Loan return (Note: Loan return to Barcelona, later transferred)	Summer	Free	
4	DF	(Chile)	Igor Lichnovsky	21	Valladolid	Loan return (Note: Loan return to Porto, later loaned again)	Summer	Free	
3	DF	(Spain)	Álex Menéndez	24	Girona	End of contract	Summer	Free	
8	MF	(Spain)	Álex Barrera	25	Zaragoza	End of contract	Summer	Free	
9	FW	(Spain)	Miguel Ángel Guerrero	25	Leganés	End of contract	Summer	Free	
5	DF	(Colombia)	Bernardo	26	Middlesbrough (England)	End of contract	Summer	Free	
13	GK	(Spain)	Alberto	31	Getafe	Contract terminated	Summer	Free	
21	DF	(Bosnia and Herzegovina)	Ognjen Vranješ	26	Tom Tomsk (Russia)	Mutual consent	Summer	Free	
22	MF	(Spain)	Pablo Pérez	23	Alcorcón	Loan	Summer	Free	
8	DF	(Algeria)	Rachid Aït-Atmane	23	Tenerife	Loan	Winter	Free	

== Technical staff ==
Position	Staff
Manager	Rubi (replaced Abelardo Fernández)
Assistant Manager	Jaume Torras (replaced Iñaki Tejada)
Goalkeeping Coach	Diego Tuero (replaced Isidro Fernández)
Physical Fitness Coach	Xabi Gil (replaced Gerardo Ruiz)
Director of Football	Nicolás Rodríguez
Delegate	Mario Cotelo
Academy Director	José María M. Acebal

Source: Sporting de Gijón Official Website

=== Managerial changes ===
Outgoing manager	Manner of departure	Date of vacancy	Position in table	Incoming manager	Date of appointment
(Spain) Abelardo Fernández	Mutual consent	17 January 2017	18th	(Spain) Rubi	17 January 2017

== Pre-season and friendlies ==
19 July 2016 Friendly	Fafe (Portugal)	1–1	Real Sporting	Arcos de Valdevez, Portugal
19:30	Materazzi 81'	Report	Víctor Rodríguez 7'	Stadium: Municipal da Coutada; Referee: Bruno Nunes

22 July 2016 Recontro de Valdevez	Feirense (Portugal)	2–0	Real Sporting	Arcos de Valdevez, Portugal
19:00	Fabinho 62' (pen.); Platiny 82' (pen.)	Report		Stadium: Municipal da Coutada; Attendance: 237; Referee: Bruno Nunes

23 July 2016 Friendly	Rio Ave (Portugal)	1–0	Real Sporting	Vila do Conde, Portugal
18:30	Yazalde 34'	Report		Stadium: Estádio dos Arcos; Attendance: 1,500; Referee: Armando Mendes

27 July 2016 Friendly	Athletic Bilbao	1–1	Real Sporting	Leioa
18:30	Williams 79'	Report	Burgui 9' (pen.)	Stadium: Sarriena; Attendance: 2,400; Referee: Ricardo de Burgos Bengoetxea

30 July 2016 Memorial M. Preciado	Racing Santander	0–2 (1–3 p)	Real Sporting	Santander
19:00		Report	Carmona 15'; Álvaro Bustos 38'	Stadium: El Sardinero; Attendance: 3,000; Referee: Fuente Martín
	Penalties
	Granero; Óscar Fernández (penalty missed)		Carmona; Isma López; Moi Gómez
Note: 45-minute game.

30 July 2016 Memorial M. Preciado	Real Sporting	0–1	Alavés	Santander
21:10		Report	Manu García 44' (pen.)	Stadium: El Sardinero; Attendance: 3,000; Referee: Fuente Martín
Note: 45-minute game.

3 August 2016 Friendly	Lugo	3–0	Real Sporting	Lugo
20:00	Yelko 21'; Joselu 36', 79'	Report		Stadium: Anxo Carro; Referee: Eiriz Mata

6 August 2016 Friendly	Nancy (France)	0–0	Real Sporting	Tomblaine, France
18:00		Report		Stadium: Marcel Picot; Attendance: 2,573; Referee: Benoît Bastien

13 August 2016 Villa de Gijón	Real Sporting	1–1 (4–2 p)	Deportivo La Coruña	Gijón
20:30	Čop 18'	Report	Bruno Gama 80'	Stadium: El Molinón; Attendance: 13,500; Referee: González González
	Penalties
	Isma López (penalty scored); Moi Gómez (penalty scored); Carmona (penalty scored); Pablo Pérez (penalty scored)		Andone (penalty missed); Guilherme (penalty scored); Emre (penalty scored); Bruno Gama (penalty missed)

1 September 2016 Friendly	Real Sporting	1–1	Eibar	Barreda
19:00	Viguera 77'	Report	Adrián 82'	Stadium: Solvay; Attendance: 700; Referee: Cordero Vega

6 October 2016 Friendly	Real Sporting	2–1	Real Sociedad	Torrelavega
18:00	Moi Gómez 26'; Viguera 53'	Report	Willian José 90'	Stadium: El Malecón; Attendance: 800; Referee: Pardeiro Puente

9 November 2016 Friendly	Real Sporting	0–2	Alavés	Avilés
19:00		Report	Deyverson 20'; Espinoza 55'	Stadium: Román Suárez Puerta; Referee: Areces Franco

== Competitions ==
=== La Liga ===
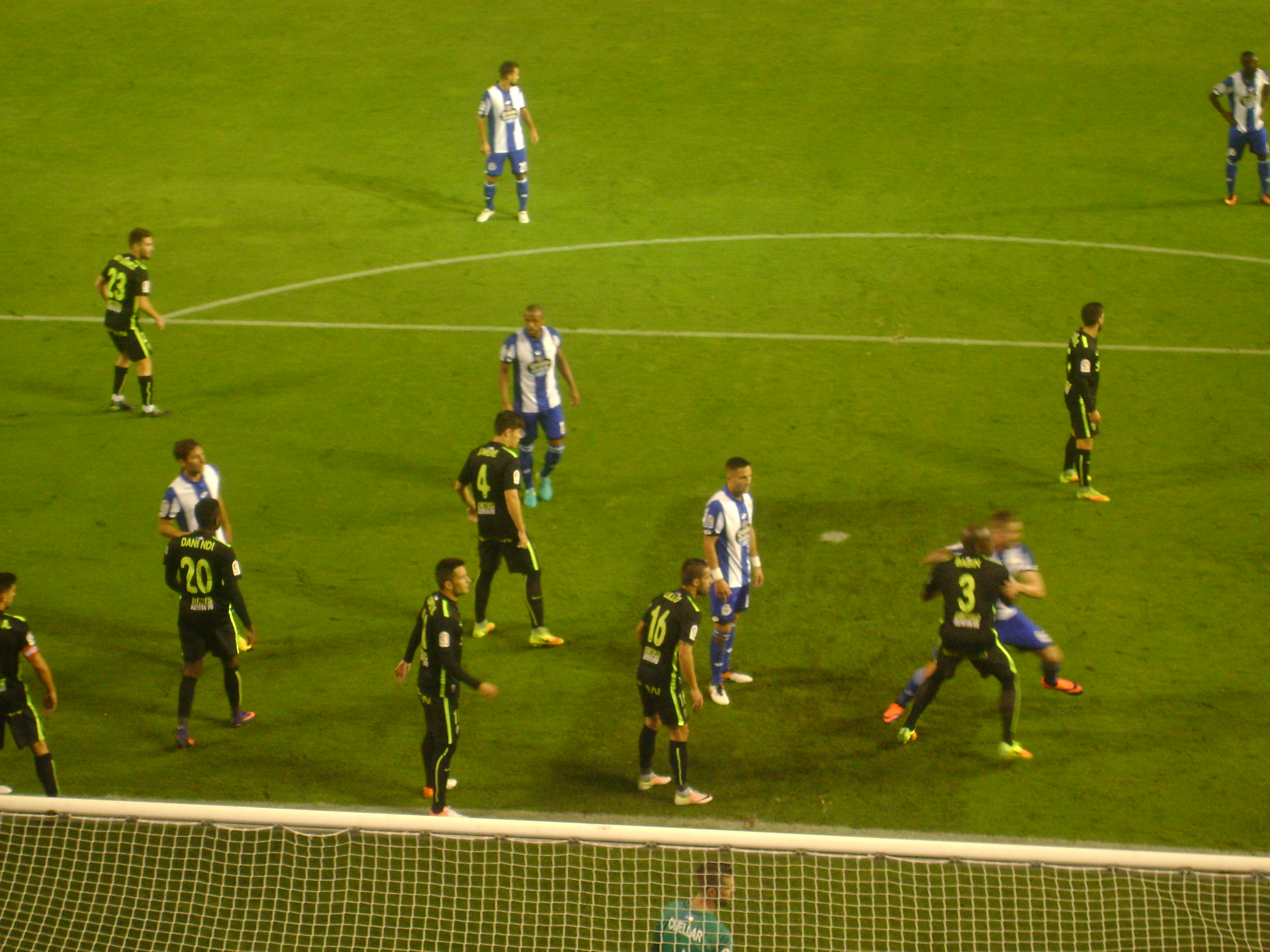
Round 7 game against Deportivo de La Coruña.

==== League table ====
Pos	Team	Pld	W	D	L	GF	GA	GD	Pts	Qualification or relegation
16	Deportivo La Coruña	38	8	12	18	43	61	−18	36	
17	Leganés	38	8	11	19	36	55	−19	35	
18	Sporting Gijón (R)	38	7	10	21	42	72	−30	31	Relegation to Segunda División
19	Osasuna (R)	38	4	10	24	40	94	−54	22	Relegation to Segunda División
20	Granada (R)	38	4	8	26	30	82	−52	20	Relegation to Segunda División

Source: La Liga, Soccerway
Rules for classification: 1) Points; 2) Head-to-head points; 3) Head-to-head goal difference; 4) Goal difference; 5) Goals scored; 6) Fair-play points; 7) Play-off.
(R) Relegated

==== Results summary ====
Overall								Home						Away					
Pld	W	D	L	GF	GA	GD	Pts	W	D	L	GF	GA	GD	W	D	L	GF	GA	GD
38	7	10	21	42	72	−30	31	5	4	10	26	38	−12	2	6	11	16	34	−18

==== Results by round ====
Round	1	2	3	4	5	6	7	8	9	10	11	12	13	14	15	16	17	18	19	20	21	22	23	24	25	26	27	28	29	30	31	32	33	34	35	36	37	38
Ground	H	A	H	A	A	H	A	H	A	H	A	H	A	H	A	H	A	H	A	A	H	A	H	H	A	H	A	H	A	H	A	H	A	H	A	H	A	H
Result	W	D	W	L	L	L	L	L	D	D	L	L	L	W	L	L	L	L	D	L	L	W	L	D	L	L	D	W	D	L	L	L	D	D	L	W	W	D
Position	6	6	3	8	11	14	16	18	18	18	18	18	18	18	18	18	18	18	18	18	18	18	18	18	19	19	19	18	18	18	18	18	18	18	18	18	18	18

Source: BDFútbol
A = Away; H = Home; W = Win; D = Draw; L = Loss

==== Matches ====
21 August 2016 1	Real Sporting	2–1	Athletic Bilbao	Gijón
18:15	Isma López (yellow card) 15' (penalty missed) 61'; Amorebieta (yellow card) 45'; Čop 50'; Víctor Rodríguez 53'; Cuéllar (yellow card) 89'	Report	Laporte (yellow card) 59'; Eneko Bóveda (yellow card) 60'; Muniain (yellow card) 75'; Viguera 86'	Stadium: El Molinón; Attendance: 24,833; Referee: Clos Gómez

28 August 2016 2	Alavés	0–0	Real Sporting	Vitoria-Gasteiz
18:15	Deyverson (yellow card) 27'	Report	Moi Gómez (yellow card) 66'	Stadium: Mendizorrotza; Attendance: 14,030; Referee: José Luis Munuera Montero

11 September 2016 3	Real Sporting	2–1	Leganés	Gijón
12:00	Cases 17'; Čop 43' (pen.)	Report	Diego Rico 58'	Stadium: El Molinón; Attendance: 22,364; Referee: Vicandi Garrido

17 September 2016 4	Atlético Madrid	5–0	Real Sporting	Madrid
16:15	Griezmann 2', 31'; Gameiro 5'; Torres 72', 90+1' (pen.)	Report	Amorebieta (yellow card) 16'; Lillo (yellow card) 90'	Stadium: Vicente Calderón; Attendance: 45,700; Referee: Ocón Arraiz

21 September 2016 5	Celta	2–1	Real Sporting	Vigo
20:00	Hugo Mallo 66'; Radoja (yellow card) 77'; Roncaglia (yellow card) 79'; Iago Aspas 87' (pen.)	Report	Amorebieta (yellow card) 33'; Viguera (yellow card) 67'; Čop 80' (pen.); Cases (yellow card) 86'	Stadium: Balaídos; Attendance: 14,999; Referee: Melero López

24 September 2016 6	Real Sporting	0–5	Barcelona	Gijón
16:15	Lora (yellow card) 9' (yellow-red card) 74'; Amorebieta (yellow card) 86'	Report	Suárez 29'; Rafinha 32'; Neymar 81', 88'; Arda Turan 85'	Stadium: El Molinón; Attendance: 25,899; Referee: Del Cerro Grande

1 October 2016 7	Deportivo La Coruña	2–1	Real Sporting	A Coruña
20:45	Borges 35'; Babel 90+2'	Report	Sergio Álvarez (yellow card) 43' (goal) 65'; Moi Gómez (yellow card) 54'; Meré (yellow card) 59'; Isma López (yellow card) 85'	Stadium: Riazor; Attendance: 23,957; Referee: Ricardo de Burgos Bengoetxea

16 October 2016 8	Real Sporting	1–2	Valencia	Gijón
18:30	Aït-Atmane (yellow card) 23'; Castro 41'; Čop (yellow card) 45+1'; Meré (yellow card) 64'; Burgui (yellow card) 76'; Amorebieta (yellow card) 90'	Report	Suárez 7', 65'; Bakkali (yellow card) 80'	Stadium: El Molinón; Attendance: 23,915; Referee: José Luis Munuera Montero

22 October 2016 9	Granada	0–0	Real Sporting	Granada
20:45	Angban (yellow card) 71'; Uche (yellow card) 75'; Kravets (yellow card) 90'; Cuenca (yellow card) 90+2'	Report	Sergio Álvarez (yellow card) 80'	Stadium: Los Cármenes; Attendance: 14,622; Referee: Vicandi Garrido

29 October 2016 10	Real Sporting	1–1	Sevilla	Gijón
13:00	Isma López (yellow card) 6'; Moi Gómez 20' (yellow card) 26'; Cuéllar (yellow card) 23'; Čop (yellow card) 24'; Cases (yellow card) 71'; Amorebieta (yellow card) 83'	Report	Vietto 4'; Mercado (yellow card) 23'; Carriço (yellow card) 90+1'	Stadium: El Molinón; Attendance: 22,803; Referee: Iglesias Villanueva

4 November 2016 11	Málaga	3–2	Real Sporting	Málaga
20:45	Chory Castro (yellow card) 42'; Pablo Fornals 45+2' (yellow card) 90+4'; Villanueva (yellow card) 48'; Michael Santos (yellow card) 52' (goal) 78'; Sandro 65'; Camacho (yellow card) 74'	Report	Lillo (yellow card) 11' (yellow-red card) 71'; Viguera 13'; Amorebieta (yellow card) 28'; Isma López (yellow card) 35'; Sergio Álvarez (yellow card) 40'; Čop 49'	Stadium: La Rosaleda; Attendance: 20,558; Referee: Gil Manzano

20 November 2016 12	Real Sporting	1–3	Real Sociedad	Gijón
18:30	Čop 28'; Xavi Torres (yellow card) 77'	Report	Xabi Prieto 19'; Zurutuza 51'; Iñigo Martínez 56'; Willian José (yellow card) 86'	Stadium: El Molinón; Attendance: 23,059; Referee: Juan Martínez Munuera

26 November 2016 13	Real Madrid	2–1	Real Sporting	Madrid
16:15	Ronaldo 5' (pen.), 18'; Nacho (yellow card) 77'	Report	Carmona 35' (yellow card) 66'; Amorebieta (yellow card) 40'; Rachid (yellow card) 61'; Čop (penalty missed) 78'	Stadium: Santiago Bernabéu; Attendance: 67,118; Referee: Hernández Hernández

4 December 2016 14	Real Sporting	3–1	Osasuna	Gijón
18:30	Amorebieta (yellow card) 37'; Carmona 47', 78'; Douglas 56', (yellow card) 68'; Čop (yellow card) 67'	Report	Márquez (yellow card) 39'; Flaño 86'	Stadium: El Molinón; Attendance: 25,800; Referee: Ricardo de Burgos Bengoetxea

11 December 2016 15	Espanyol	2–1	Real Sporting	Barcelona
18:30	Caicedo 54'; Diop (yellow card) 68'; Baptistão 90'	Report	Rachid (yellow card) 84'; Sergio Álvarez (yellow card) 86'; Čop 90+2'	Stadium: RCDE Stadium; Attendance: 19,353; Referee: Del Cerro Grande

17 December 2016 16	Real Sporting	1–3	Villarreal	Gijón
13:00	Amorebieta (yellow card) 55'; Cases (yellow card) 60'; Carmona 89'	Report	Dos Santos 12'; Sansone 19'; Soriano (yellow card) 40'; Pato 74'	Stadium: El Molinón; Attendance: 19,662; Referee: Vicandi Garrido

7 January 2017 17	Las Palmas	1–0	Real Sporting	Las Palmas
18:30	El Zhar 55'; Momo (yellow card) 74'; Tana (yellow card) 84'	Report	Xavi Torres (yellow card) 60'; Meré (yellow card) 85'; Lillo (yellow card) 88'	Stadium: Gran Canaria; Attendance: 21,663; Referee: José Luis Munuera Montero

15 January 2017 18	Real Sporting	2–3	Eibar	Gijón
18:30	Carmona 9' (yellow card) 45'; Amorebieta (yellow card) 15'; Cases 58'; Sergio Álvarez (yellow card) 90+2'; Babin (yellow card) 90+2'	Report	Adrián 4' (pen.); Pedro León 21'; Luna 23'; Inui (yellow card) 45'	Stadium: El Molinón; Attendance: 20,050; Referee: Fernández Borbalán

22 January 2017 19	Real Betis	0–0	Real Sporting	Seville
18:30	Ceballos (yellow card) 59'; Bruno (yellow card) 90+3'	Report	Babin (yellow card) 21'; Lillo (yellow card) 84'	Stadium: Benito Villamarín; Attendance: 32,822; Referee: Undiano Mallenco

29 January 2017 20	Athletic Bilbao	2–1	Real Sporting	Bilbao
18:30	Muniain 50'; Williams (yellow card) 66'; Aritz Aduriz 71' (pen.) (yellow card) 83'; Mikel Rico (yellow card) 84'; Raúl García (yellow card) 90+2'	Report	Čop 27' (pen.); Amorebieta (yellow card) 29'; Carmona (yellow card) 68'; Xavi Torres (yellow card) 85'	Stadium: San Mamés; Attendance: 41,812; Referee: Clos Gómez

5 February 2017 21	Real Sporting	2–4	Alavés	Gijón
16:15	Vesga (yellow card) 39'; Afif (yellow card) 44'; Amorebieta (yellow card) 68'; Cuéllar (yellow card) 69'; Carmona (yellow card) 71'; Traoré (yellow card) 75' (goal) 84'; Cases (yellow card) 75'; Castro 90'	Report	Sobrino 10'; Katai (yellow card) 20'; Krstičić (yellow card) 23'; Christian Santos (yellow card) 45' (goal) 58' (pen.); Édgar Méndez 70' (pen.); Alexis 85'	Stadium: El Molinón; Attendance: 21,752; Referee: Gil Manzano

12 February 2017 22	Leganés	0–2	Real Sporting	Leganés
16:15	Diego Rico (yellow card) 21'; Bustinza (yellow card) 70'; Rubén Pérez (yellow card) 83'	Report	Canella (yellow card) 8' (goal) 66'; Traoré (yellow card) 30'; Carmona (yellow card) 54'; Mariño (red card) 70'; Čop (yellow card) 74'; Lillo (yellow card) 76'; Burgui 83' (yellow card) 84'	Stadium: Butarque; Attendance: 8,232; Referee: Estrada Fernández
Note: Mariño and Čop were not in the pitch when their cards were shown.

18 February 2017 23	Real Sporting	1–4	Atlético Madrid	Gijón
13:00	Sergio Álvarez 49'; Vesga (yellow card) 57'	Report	Carrasco 46'; Thomas (yellow card) 72'; Gameiro 80', 81', 85'	Stadium: El Molinón; Attendance: 24,013; Referee: González González

26 February 2017 24	Real Sporting	1–1	Celta	Gijón
18:30	Moi Gómez 49' (pen.); Amorebieta (yellow card) 58'; Meré (red card) 74'; Cuéllar (yellow card) 90+3'	Report	Fontàs (yellow card) 55'; Marcelo Díaz (yellow card) 57'; Aspas 75'; Roncaglia (yellow card) 90+1'; Beauvue (yellow card) 90+3'	Stadium: El Molinón; Attendance: 23,797; Referee: Ricardo de Burgos Bengoetxea

1 March 2017 25	Barcelona	6–1	Real Sporting	Barcelona
19:30	Messi 9'; L. Suárez 11', 27'; Neymar (yellow card) 45' (goal) 65'; Alcácer 49'; Rakitić 87'	Report	Castro 21' (yellow card) 45'; Burgui (yellow card) 24'; Juan Rodríguez (yellow card) 55'	Stadium: Camp Nou; Attendance: 55,029; Referee: José María Sánchez Martínez

15 January 2017 26	Real Sporting	0–1	Deportivo La Coruña	Gijón
12:00	Douglas (yellow card) 45'; Meré (yellow card) 71'; Vesga (yellow card) 72'; Canella (yellow card) 88'	Report	Çolak (penalty missed) 32'; Mosquera 45' (yellow card) 59'; Fernando Navarro (yellow card) 45'; Arribas (yellow card) 45'; Carles Gil (yellow card) 88'; Luisinho (yellow card) 88'	Stadium: El Molinón; Attendance: 23,586; Referee: Mateu Lahoz

11 March 2017 27	Valencia	1–1	Real Sporting	Valencia
13:00	Orellana (yellow card) 2'; Zaza (yellow card) 19'; Mangala (yellow card) 50'; Parejo (penalty missed) 55'; Munir 85'	Report	Cases (yellow card) 29'; Douglas (yellow card) 49'; Čop 60' (yellow card) 76'; Cuéllar (yellow card) 79'; Xavi Torres (yellow card) 90+1'	Stadium: Mestalla; Attendance: 28,921; Referee: Álvarez Izquierdo

19 March 2017 28	Real Sporting	3–1	Granada	Gijón
18:30	Traoré 60' (penalty missed) 82'; Babin 64'; Douglas (yellow card) 65'; Carmona 67'; Meré (yellow card) 90+2'	Report	Angban (yellow card) 37'; Ingason 51' (yellow card) 81'; Mallé (yellow card) 86'	Stadium: El Molinón; Attendance: 24,129; Referee: Estrada Fernández

2 April 2017 29	Sevilla	0–0	Real Sporting	Sevilla
12:00	Pareja (yellow card) 59'; Nasri (yellow card) 75'; Mariano (yellow card) 83'	Report	Vesga (yellow card) 34'; Lillo (yellow card) 58'; Amorebieta (yellow card) 61'; Xavi Torres (yellow card) 78'	Stadium: Ramón Sánchez Pizjuán; Attendance: 31,382; Referee: Vicandi Garrido

5 April 2017 30	Real Sporting	0–1	Málaga	Gijón
20:30	Burgui (yellow card) 80'; Meré 86'	Report	Fornals (yellow card) 21'; Sandro 40' (yellow card) 45'; Hernández (yellow card) 58'; Keko (yellow card) 70'; Juanpi (yellow card) 90+4'	Stadium: El Molinón; Attendance: 23,729; Referee: José María Sánchez Martínez

10 April 2017 31	Real Sociedad	3–1	Real Sporting	San Sebastián
20:45	Willian José 3'; Juanmi 27' (yellow card) 72'; Yuri 77'	Report	Sergio Álvarez (yellow card) 17'; Vesga (yellow card) 23'; Xavi Torres (yellow card) 31'; Amorebieta (yellow card) 80'; Echiéjilé 87'; Burgui (yellow card) 90+1'	Stadium: Anoeta; Attendance: 18,894; Referee: González González

15 April 2017 32	Real Sporting	2–3	Real Madrid	Gijón
16:15	Čop 14'; Sergio Álvarez (yellow card) 34'; Vesga 50'; Lillo (yellow card) 61'; Isma López (yellow card) 79'; Cases (yellow card) 87'; Afif (yellow card) 90+2'	Report	Isco 17', 90'; Morata 59' (yellow card) 89'	Stadium: El Molinón; Attendance: 23,745; Referee: Fernández Borbalán

22 April 2017 33	Osasuna	2–2	Real Sporting	Pamplona
18:30	Meré 19' (o.g.); Fausto (yellow card) 49'; Kenan Kodro 72' (yellow card) 73'; Fuentes (yellow card) 90+1'	Report	Moi Gómez (yellow card) 36'; Sergio Álvarez (yellow card) 41'; Meré (yellow card) 62'; Burgui (yellow card) 71'; Canella 79'; Castro 81'	Stadium: El Sadar; Attendance: 15,032; Referee: Gil Manzano

25 April 2017 34	Real Sporting	1–1	Espanyol	Gijón
19:00	Víctor Rodríguez (yellow card) 18' (goal) 39'	Report	Javi Fuego (yellow card) 15'; Gerard 55'; Víctor Sánchez (yellow card) 83'	Stadium: El Molinón; Attendance: 20,608; Referee: Melero López

28 April 2017 35	Villarreal	3–1	Real Sporting	Villarreal
20:45	Soldado 37'; Bakambu 47', 59'; J. Dos Santos (yellow card) 64'; Bonera (yellow card) 84'	Report	Amorebieta (yellow card) 35'; Douglas 73'	Stadium: Estadio de La Cerámica; Attendance: 14,903; Referee: Estrada Fernández

6 May 2017 36	Real Sporting	1–0	Las Palmas	Gijón
13:00	Sergio Álvarez 32'; Douglas (yellow card) 49'; Carmona 67'; Čop (yellow card) 71'; Canella (yellow card) 80'	Report	Roque Mesa (yellow card) 41'; Hernán (yellow card) 90+1'; Hélder (yellow card) 90+3'	Stadium: El Molinón; Attendance: 20,942; Referee: Jaime Latre

14 May 2017 37	Eibar	0–1	Real Sporting	Eibar
20:00	Burgui 32'; Vesga (yellow card) 80'; Čop (yellow card) 89'	Report	Lejeune (yellow card) 59'; Sergi Enrich (yellow card) 60'	Stadium: Ipurua; Attendance: 5,577; Referee: Juan Martínez Munuera

21 May 2017 38	Real Sporting	2–2	Real Betis	Gijón
17:00	Douglas 7'; Carmona 79'	Report	Rubén Castro 22', 59'; Cejudo 37'; Durmisi (yellow card) 86'	Stadium: El Molinón; Attendance: 15,365; Referee: Iglesias Villanueva

=== Copa del Rey ===
29 November 2016 Round of 32; First leg	Real Sporting	1–2	Eibar	Gijón
21:00	Viguera (penalty missed) 33' 62'	Report	Bebé 2'; Rivera (yellow card) 57'; Escalante (yellow card) 66'; Rubén Peña 89'	Stadium: El Molinón; Attendance: 11,806; Referee: José María Sánchez Martínez

21 December 2016 Round of 32; Second leg	Eibar	3–1 (5–2 agg.)	Real Sporting	Eibar
19:00	Kike 1', 46'; Rivera (yellow card) 23'; Gálvez (yellow card) 30'; Adrián 44'; Capa (yellow card) 63'	Report	Viguera (yellow card) 49'; Xavi Torres (yellow card) 80'; Rubén 89'	Stadium: Ipurua; Attendance: 4,085; Referee: Gil Manzano

== Statistics ==
=== Appearances and goals ===
No.	Pos	Nat	Player	Total		La Liga		Copa del Rey	
No.	Pos	Nat	Player	Apps	Goals	Apps	Goals	Apps	Goals
1	GK	(Spain) ESP	Iván Cuéllar	36	0	36+0	0	0+0	0
2	DF	(Brazil) BRA	Douglas	23	3	20+1	3	1+1	0
3	DF	(Martinique) MTQ	Jean-Sylvain Babin	24	1	20+2	1	2+0	0
4	DF	(Spain) ESP	Jorge Meré	32	0	31+0	0	1+0	0
5	DF	(Venezuela) VEN	Fernando Amorebieta	27	0	26+1	0	0+0	0
6	MF	(Spain) ESP	Sergio Álvarez	36	2	34+2	2	0+0	0
7	MF	(Spain) ESP	Víctor Rodríguez	26	2	15+9	2	2+0	0
8	FW	(Ivory Coast) CIV	Lacina Traoré	8	2	5+3	2	0+0	0
9	FW	(Spain) ESP	Carlos Castro	26	4	10+15	4	0+1	0
10	MF	(Spain) ESP	Nacho Cases	22	2	16+4	2	2+0	0
11	MF	(Spain) ESP	Alberto Lora	7	0	4+3	0	0+0	0
12	DF	(Nigeria) NGR	Elderson Echiéjilé	3	1	2+1	1	0+0	0
13	GK	(Spain) ESP	Diego Mariño	4	0	2+0	0	2+0	0
14	MF	(Spain) ESP	Burgui	34	2	21+11	2	2+0	0
15	DF	(Spain) ESP	Roberto Canella	22	2	20+0	2	2+0	0
16	DF	(Spain) ESP	Lillo	26	0	24+1	0	1+0	0
17	FW	(Qatar) QAT	Akram Afif	11	0	2+7	0	0+2	0
18	FW	(Spain) ESP	Isma López	27	0	19+8	0	0+0	0
19	MF	(Spain) ESP	Carlos Carmona	27	8	21+4	8	2+0	0
20	MF	(Cameroon) CMR	Dani Ndi	6	0	1+5	0	0+0	0
21	MF	(Spain) ESP	Xavi Torres	19	0	8+9	0	2+0	0
22	MF	(Spain) ESP	Mikel Vesga	17	1	16+1	1	0+0	0
23	MF	(Spain) ESP	Moi Gómez	26	2	24+2	2	0+0	0
24	FW	(Croatia) CRO	Duje Čop	31	9	27+4	9	0+0	0
25	FW	(Spain) ESP	Borja Viguera	17	2	6+9	1	2+0	1
26	DF	(Spain) ESP	Pablo Fernández	2	0	0+2	0	0+0	0
29	DF	(Spain) ESP	Juan Rodríguez	5	0	2+2	0	1+0	0
30	GK	(Spain) ESP	Óscar Whalley	0	0	0+0	0	0+0	0
31	FW	(Spain) ESP	Rubén	3	1	0+2	0	0+1	1
33	MF	(Spain) ESP	Cristian	1	0	0+0	0	0+1	0
Players who have left the club after the start of the season:
8	MF	(Algeria) ALG	Rachid Aït-Atmane	8	0	6+2	0	0+0	0

=== Disciplinary record ===
N	P	Nat.	Name	La Liga			Copa del Rey			Total			Notes
N	P	Nat.	Name	Yellow card	Second yellow card	Red card	Yellow card	Second yellow card	Red card	Yellow card	Second yellow card	Red card	Notes
4	DF	(Spain)	Jorge Meré	7		1				7		1	
13	GK	(Spain)	Diego Mariño			1						1	
17	DF	(Spain)	Lillo	7	1					7	1		
11	MF	(Spain)	Alberto Lora		1						1		3 times captain
5	DF	(Venezuela)	Fernando Amorebieta	17						17			
6	MF	(Spain)	Sergio Álvarez	8						8			9 times captain
21	MF	(Spain)	Xavi Torres	6			1			7			
2	DF	(Brazil)	Douglas	6						6			
10	MF	(Spain)	Nacho Cases	6						6			5 times captain
14	MF	(Spain)	Burgui	6						6			
22	MF	(Spain)	Mikel Vesga	6						6			
24	FW	(Croatia)	Duje Čop	6						6			
1	GK	(Spain)	Iván Cuéllar	5						5			
18	FW	(Spain)	Isma López	5						5			
19	MF	(Spain)	Carlos Carmona	5						5			One time captain
23	MF	(Spain)	Moi Gómez	4						4			
15	DF	(Spain)	Roberto Canella	3						3			21 times captain
3	DF	(Martinique)	Jean-Sylvain Babin	2						2			snake
8	FW	(Ivory Coast)	Lacina Traoré	2						2			
9	FW	(Spain)	Carlos Castro	2						2			
16	FW	(Qatar)	Akram Afif	2						2			
25	FW	(Spain)	Borja Viguera	1			1			2			
7	MF	(Spain)	Víctor Rodríguez	1						1			
29	DF	(Spain)	Juan Rodríguez	1						1			
12	DF	(Nigeria)	Elderson Echiéjilé										
20	MF	(Cameroon)	Dani Ndi										
30	GK	(Spain)	Óscar Whalley										
Players who have left the club after the start of the season:
8	MF	(Algeria)	Rachid Aït-Atmane	3						3			

Ordered by (red card) , (second yellow card) and (yellow card)
(yellow card) = Number of bookings; (second yellow card) = Number of sending offs after a second yellow card; (red card) = Number of sending offs by a direct red card.
