= 2014–15 Sporting de Gijón season =

Real Sporting
2014–15 season
- President: Antonio Veiga
- Manager: Abelardo
- Stadium: El Molinón
- Segunda División: 2nd
- Copa del Rey: Second round
- Top goalscorer: Miguel Ángel Guerrero (11 goals)
- Highest home attendance: 26,783; Sporting 2–0 Sabadell (31 March 2015)
- Lowest home attendance: League: 12,240; Sporting 3–1 Zaragoza (9 November 2014); Cup: 9,200; Sporting 1–3 Valladolid (10 September 2014)
- Average home league attendance: 19,318
Home colours	Away colours	Third colours

The 2014–15 Sporting de Gijón season was the third season that the club will play in Segunda División after the relegation from the highest tier of football in Spain, La Liga. Sporting finished as runner-up and promoted to the top tier.

== Season overview ==
=== Preseason ===
Despite not promoting to La Liga, head coach Abelardo Fernández extended his contract for two seasons. Sporting started the preseason on July 17 and played nine friendly games, two of them in a 45-minute game format.

On July 22, Carlos Carmona extended his contract until 2019. One day later, Sporting finished its first friendly defeating Marino de Luanco by 1–0 in a game without new signings and several players of the reserve team.

Preseason ended with a no-goals draw with Getafe in the Trofeo Villa de Gijón. Finally, Sporting won its tournament six years later.

=== August ===
As in the previous season, the club started the league earning the three points. At Soria, Sporting went back from a goal against thank to the goals of Miguel Ángel Guerrero and Juan Muñiz. The club continued its good start debuting in El Molinón with a new win by 2–1 over Ponferradina.

=== September ===
On September 1, striker Stefan Šćepović signed a four-year deal with Celtic for £2.3 million, having turned down a move the day before. In the same press release confirming the transfer, Sporting announced Julio and Carlos Castro would be promoted to the first team. The club was the only professional team in Spain which did not sign any new player in the Summer window transfer.

In the first game of the month, at Albacete, a header in the 93rd minute of Pablo Pérez served to save one point and to remain unbeaten in the league prior to the game at El Molinón versus Girona, which won its three first games. The Catalan team equalized the game in the last minute with a goal of David Juncà.

Previously, on September 10, Sporting was defeated by Real Valladolid by 1–3 in the second round of the Copa del Rey and subsequently eliminated.

In the two next games, Pablo Pérez netted two goals to beat Mirandés at Anduva and a header of Miguel Ángel Guerrero equalized the game versus Valladolid, allowing Sporting to finish the month of September becoming the only undefeated team in Segunda División.

=== October ===
On October 6, Abelardo was named Coach of the Month by the LFP. Sporting remained as the only unbeaten team in the league achieving two more home wins and two draws away, finishing the month in the third position.

=== November ===
On November 22, Abelardo's team beat the record of Vujadin Boškov in the club and remained unbeaten for the 14th game in a row, after a no-goal draw at El Molinón versus Llagostera. In the next game, at Mallorca, Sporting beat this record and tied the longest unbeaten streak since the start of the season.

=== January ===
On January 18, Sporting lost its first league game after a streak of 20 games unbeaten. Despite a goal of Juan Muñiz in the 6th minute, Betis scored twice in the second half and won by 1–2 at El Molinón. With this loss, the team finished the first half of the league in the fifth position with 38 points.

=== June ===
Sporting finally promoted on June 7, after beating widely Betis by 0–3 and after the draw of Girona versus Lugo at Montilivi.

== Players ==
=== Current squad ===
N	Pos.	Nat.	Name	Age	Since	App	Goals	Ends	Transfer fee	Notes
1	GK	(Spain)	Iván Cuéllar (3rd captain)	30	2008	95	0	2015	Free	
2	DF	(Spain)	Luis Hernández	25	2013	57	1	2016	Youth system	
3	DF	(Spain)	Álex Menéndez	22	2011	12	0	2016	Youth system	
4	DF	(Spain)	Mandi	25	2012	55	2	2016	Free	
5	DF	(Colombia)	Bernardo Espinosa	24	2013 (Winter)	54	3	2016	Free	Second nationality: Spain
6	MF	(Spain)	Sergio Álvarez	22	2013	42	2	2015	Youth system	
7	MF	(Spain)	Juan Muñiz	22	2010	21	3	2015	Youth system	
8	MF	(Spain)	Álex Barrera	23	2012	50	3	2016	Youth system	
9	FW	(Spain)	Miguel Ángel Guerrero	23	2012	29	3	2016	Youth system	
10	MF	(Spain)	Nacho Cases	26	2011	98	5	2018	Youth system	
11	MF	(Spain)	Alberto Lora (vice-captain)	27	2007	169	7	2018	Youth system	
13	GK	(Spain)	Alberto García (4th captain)	29	2013	3	0	2017	Free	
14	DF	(Spain)	Iván Hernández (captain)	34	2007	156	1	2015	Free	
15	FW	(Spain)	Álex Serrano	19	2013	2	0	2015	Youth system	
16	FW	(Spain)	Carlos Castro	19	2014	0	0	2017	Youth system	
17	FW	(Spain)	Santi Jara	23	2013	46	5	2016	Youth system	
18	DF	(Spain)	Isma López	24	2013	19	1	2016	Free	
19	MF	(Spain)	Carlos Carmona	26	2012	65	11	2019	Free	
20	DF	(Spain)	Julio Rodríguez	18	2014	0	0	2018	Youth system	
21	FW	(Spain)	Hugo Fraile	38	2013	20	3	2015	Free	
23	MF	(Spain)	Jony	22	2014	5	2	2016	Youth system	

- Last updated: 1 September 2014
- Source: Stats updated as of the end of the 2013–14 season. Only league and playoff games included. Ages to 30 June 2014
- Ordered by squad number.

=== Reserve team players ===
Note: Flags indicate national team as defined under FIFA eligibility rules; some limited exceptions apply. Players may hold more than one non-FIFA nationality.

No.	Pos.	Nation	Player
26	GK	(Spain) ESP	Dennis
28	MF	(Spain) ESP	Jorge Meré
29	MF	(Algeria) ALG	Rachid Aït-Atmane

No.	Pos.	Nation	Player
30	MF	(Spain) ESP	Pablo Pérez
32	FW	(Spain) ESP	Álvaro Bustos
33	MF	(Cameroon) CMR	Dani Ndi

=== In ===
No.	Pos.	Nat.	Name	Age	Moving from	Type	Transfer window	Ends	Transfer fee	Source
23	MF	(Spain)	Jony	22	Sporting B	Promoted	Summer	2016	Free	
7	MF	(Spain)	Juan Muñiz	22	Mirandés	Loan return	Summer	2015	Free	
20	DF	(Spain)	Julio Rodríguez	18	Sporting B	Promoted	Summer		Free	
16	FW	(Spain)	Carlos Castro	19	Sporting B	Promoted	Summer		Free	

=== Out ===
No.	Pos.	Nat.	Name	Age	Moving to	Type	Transfer window	Transfer fee	Source
23	MF	(Spain)	Cristian Bustos	35	Mallorca	Loan return	Summer	Free	
15	DF	(Spain)	Roberto Canella	26	Deportivo La Coruña	Loan	Summer	Free	Real Sporting
7	MF	(Spain)	Javier Casquero	38		End of contract	Summer	Free	
16	FW	(Serbia)	Dejan Lekić	28	Eibar	Loan return	Summer	Free	
20	MF	(Spain)	Aritz López Garai	33	Córdoba	Mutual consent	Summer	Free	
–	DF	(Spain)	Pedro Orfila	26	Racing Santander	Mutual consent	Summer	Free	Real Sporting
22	MF	(Guinea-Bissau)	Formose Mendy	25	Blackpool (England)	Mutual consent	Summer	Free	Real Sporting
12	FW	(Serbia)	Stefan Šćepović	24	Celtic (Scotland)	Transfer	Summer	€2.5m	Celtic FC

== Technical staff ==
Position	Staff
Manager	Abelardo Fernández
Assistant Manager	Iñaki Tejada
Goalkeeping Coach	Isidro Fernández
Physical Fitness Coach	Gerardo Ruiz
Director of Football	Raúl Lozano
Delegate	Quini
Academy Director	José María M. Acebal

Source: Sporting de Gijón Official Website

== Competitions ==
=== Preseason and friendlies ===
23 July	Marino de Luanco	0–1	Real Sporting	Miramar, Luanco
20:00		Report	Carlos Castro 77'	Attendance: 1,500; Referee: Areces Franco

26 July	Real Sporting	3–1	Selección AFE	Mareo, Gijón
19:00	Guerrero 57'; Pablo Pérez 84'; Bustos 89'	Report	Gabilondo 18'	Attendance: 447; Referee: Pérez Rato

30 July Ciudad de León; 45 minutes game	Ponferradina	0–0	Real Sporting	Reino de León, León
19:30		Summary

30 July Ciudad de León; 45 minutes game	Cultural Leonesa	0–1	Real Sporting	Reino de León, León
19:30		Summary	Muñiz 19'

2 August Emma Cuervo	Lugo	2–2 (4–1 p)	Real Sporting	Pepe Barrera, Ribadeo
19:30	Pavón 6'; Manu 40' (pen.)	Summary	Guerrero 54'; Manu 64' (o.g.)	Referee: Del Río Amor

6 August Ramón Losada	Real Sporting	0–1	Racing de Santander	La Veigona, Luarca
19:00		Summary	Iñaki 28'	Attendance: 700; Referee: Fernández Pérez

9 August Teresa Herrera; Semifinal	Real Sporting	2–0	(Portugal) Sporting CP	Riazor, A Coruña
18:00	Bernardo 80'; Luis Hernández 85'	Summary		Attendance: 1,500; Referee: González González

10 August Teresa Herrera; Final	Deportivo La Coruña	1–0	Real Sporting	Riazor, A Coruña
20:30	Álex Serrano 38' (o.g.)	Summary		Attendance: 14,000; Referee: Velasco Carballo

16 August Villa de Gijón	Real Sporting	0–0 (4–3 p)	Getafe	El Molinón, Gijón
21:00		Summary		Attendance: 7,023; Referee: González Fuertes

=== Segunda División ===
==== League table ====
Pos	Team	Pld	W	D	L	GF	GA	GD	Pts	Promotion, qualification or relegation
1	Real Betis (C, P)	42	25	9	8	73	40	+33	84	Promotion to La Liga
2	Sporting Gijón (P)	42	21	19	2	57	27	+30	82 (Note: Sporting Gijón finished ahead of Girona on goal difference; Sporting de Gijón +30, Girona +28)	Promotion to La Liga
3	Girona	42	24	10	8	63	35	+28	82	Qualification to promotion play-offs
4	Las Palmas (O, P)	42	22	12	8	73	47	+26	78	Qualification to promotion play-offs
5	Valladolid	42	21	9	12	65	40	+25	72	Qualification to promotion play-offs

Source: LFP - Liga Adelante
Rules for classification: 1) points; 2) head-to-head points; 3) head-to-head goal difference; 4) goal difference; 5) number of goals scored
(C) Champions; (O) Play-off winners; (P) Promoted

==== Results summary ====
Overall								Home						Away					
Pld	W	D	L	GF	GA	GD	Pts	W	D	L	GF	GA	GD	W	D	L	GF	GA	GD
42	21	19	2	57	27	+30	82	14	6	1	36	14	+22	7	13	1	21	13	+8

==== Positions by round ====
Round	1	2	3	4	5	6	7	8	9	10	11	12	13	14	15	16	17	18	19	20	21	22	23	24	25	26	27	28	29	30	31	32	33	34	35	36	37	38	39	40	41	42
Ground	A	H	A	H	A	H	A	H	A	H	A	H	A	H	A	H	A	H	A	A	H	H	A	H	A	H	A	H	A	H	A	H	A	H	A	H	A	H	A	H	H	A
Result	W	W	D	D	W	D	D	W	D	W	D	W	D	D	W	W	D	W	D	D	L	W	W	W	D	W	L	D	W	D	D	D	D	W	D	W	W	W	D	W	W	W
Position	5	2	3	7	3	4	4	3	4	3	4	3	4	3	3	2	2	2	2	3	5	4	3	3	4	2	5	3	2	2	2	3	3	2	3	3	3	3	3	3	3	2

Source: BDFútbol
A = Away; H = Home; W = Win; D = Draw; L = Loss

==== Matches ====
23 August 1	Numancia	1–2	Real Sporting	Soria
21:00	Juanma (yellow card) 27' (yellow-red card) 73'; Enrich (yellow card) 30' (goal) 53'; Antonio Tomás (yellow card) 46'; Regalón (yellow card) 56'	Summary	Álex Menéndez (yellow card) 34'; Jony (yellow card) 64'; Guerrero 83'; Juan Muñiz 87' (yellow card) 89'	Stadium: Los Pajaritos; Attendance: 2,987; Referee: Lesma López

31 August 2	Real Sporting	2–1	Ponferradina	Gijón
19:00	Sergio Álvarez 58'; Carmona 61'	Summary	Andy Rodríguez (yellow card) 52'; Alan (yellow card) 57'; Álex Menéndez 72' (o.g.); Lucas Domínguez (yellow card) 87'	Stadium: El Molinón; Attendance: 15,637; Referee: Figueroa Vázquez

6 September 3	Albacete	1–1	Real Sporting	Albacete
18:00	Jorge Díaz 43'	Summary	Guerrero (yellow card) 53'; Bernardo (yellow card) 79'; Pablo Pérez 90+3'	Stadium: Carlos Belmonte; Attendance: 7,846; Referee: José Luis Munuera Montero

14 September 4	Real Sporting	1–1	Girona	Gijón
12:00	Carmona (yellow card) 9'; Sergio Álvarez 45+1' (yellow card) 89'; Álex Barrera (yellow card) 64'; Luis Hernández (yellow card) 90+3'	Summary	Felipe Sanchón (penalty missed) 10'; Richy (yellow card) 29'; Lejeune (yellow card) 44'; Juncà 90+3'	Stadium: El Molinón; Attendance: 14,112; Referee: Ocón Arraiz

20 September 5	Mirandés	0–2	Real Sporting	Miranda de Ebro
18:00	Rúper (yellow card) 78'	Summary	Lora (yellow card) 20'; Pablo Pérez 40', 59'; Guerrero (yellow card) 89'	Stadium: Anduva; Attendance: 4,072; Referee: Pérez Pallás

28 September 6	Real Sporting	1–1	Valladolid	Gijón
17:00	Pablo Pérez (yellow card) 54'; Cuéllar (yellow card) 56'; Guerrero 85'	Summary	Timor (yellow card) 18'; Bergdich 58' (yellow card) 76'; André Leão (yellow card) 83'	Stadium: El Molinón; Attendance: 16,506; Referee: Medié Jiménez

4 October 7	Las Palmas	1–1	Real Sporting	Las Palmas
20:00	Culio (yellow card) 65'; Araujo 77'	Summary	Juan Muñiz (yellow card) 5' (yellow-red card) 52'; Bernardo Espinosa (yellow card) 21'; Jony 40'; Sergio Álvarez (yellow card) 80'; Iván Cuéllar (yellow card) 89'	Stadium: Gran Canaria; Attendance: 18,023; Referee: Valdés Aller

12 October 8	Real Sporting	2–1	Leganés	Gijón
17:00	Guerrero 79'; Carlos Castro 90+3'; Alberto (yellow card) 90+3'; Isma López (yellow card) 90+3'; Pablo Pérez (yellow card) 90+3'; Sergio Álvarez (yellow card) 90+3'	Summary	Rubén Peña (yellow card) 5'; Mantovani (yellow card) 21'; Velasco (yellow card) 76'; Diamanka (yellow card) 76'; Aguirre 78'; Santamaría (yellow card) 81'	Stadium: El Molinón; Attendance: 15,287; Referee: Sureda Cuenca
Note: The four yellow cards in the 93rd minute were shown when the players were in the bench and entered in the pitch to celebrate the last goal.

19 October 9	Recreativo de Huelva	1–1	Real Sporting	Huelva
12:00	Jony 7'; Carmona (yellow card) 9'Nacho Cases (yellow card) 33'	Summary	Menosse (yellow card) 5'; Jesús Vázquez (yellow card) 32'; Joselu 41'; Dimas (yellow card) 59'	Stadium: Nuevo Colombino; Attendance: 6,727; Referee: Arcediano Monescillo

26 October 10	Real Sporting	2–0	Osasuna	Gijón
17:00	Lora 4'; Pablo Pérez (yellow card) 45+2'; Juan Muñiz (yellow card) 56'; Sergio Álvarez (yellow card) 68'; Iván Hernández (yellow card) 69'; Carmona (yellow card) 86'; Carlos Castro 90+3'	Summary		Stadium: El Molinón; Attendance: 16,931; Referee: Eiriz Mata
Note: The yellow card to Iván Hernández was shown when the player was in the bench.

1 November 11	Barcelona B	0–0	Real Sporting	Barcelona
18:00	Lora (yellow card) 45'; Carmona (yellow card) 53'	Summary	Traoré (yellow card) 73'	Stadium: Mini Estadi; Attendance: 5,348; Referee: Arias López

9 November 12	Real Sporting	3–1	Zaragoza	Gijón
12:00	Carlos Castro 10' (50); Jony (yellow card) 45+2'; Lora (yellow card) 54'; Álex Menéndez (yellow card) 70'; Dani Ndi (yellow card) 88'	Summary	Dorca (yellow card) 27'; Fernández (red card) 44'; Ruiz de Galarreta (yellow card) 50'; Cabrera (yellow card) 90+4'	Stadium: El Molinón; Attendance: 12,240; Referee: Pizarro Gómez

15 November 13	Alavés	0–0	Real Sporting	Vitoria-Gasteiz
18:00	Manu García (yellow card) 30'	Summary	Sergio Álvarez (yellow card) 32'; Santi Jara (yellow card) 85'	Stadium: Mendizorroza; Attendance: 10,730; Referee: Trujillo Suárez

22 November 14	Real Sporting	0–0	Llagostera	Gijón
12:00	Dani Ndi (yellow card) 36'; Nacho Cases (yellow card) 40'	Summary	Rivas (yellow card) 37'; Querol (yellow card) 56'	Stadium: El Molinón; Attendance: 16,650; Referee: Ricardo de Burgos Bengoetxea

30 November 15	Mallorca	0–1	Real Sporting	Palma
12:00	Pau Cendrós (yellow card) 18'; Bustos (yellow card) 59'	Summary	Sergio Álvarez (yellow card) 28'; Muñiz (yellow card) 50'; Álex Serrano (yellow card) 70'; Bernardo 74'	Stadium: Iberostar Estadi; Attendance: 6,950; Referee: José María Sánchez Martínez

7 December 16	Real Sporting	2–1	Lugo	Gijón
17:00	Jony 31'; Álex Menéndez (yellow card) 41' (yellow-red card) 85'; Rachid (yellow card) 49'; Pablo Pérez 78'; Dani Ndi (yellow card) 89'	Summary	Aganzo 12'; Iriome (yellow card) 51'; Pelayo (yellow card) 72'; Jonatan Valle (yellow card) 80'; David López (yellow card) 90'	Stadium: El Molinón; Attendance: 17,205; Referee: De la Fuente Ramos

13 December 17	Racing de Santander	1–1	Real Sporting	Santander
18:00	Javi Soria (yellow card) 45'; Fede (yellow card) 53'; Iñaki 61'; Álvaro (yellow card) 70'; Borja (yellow card) 78'	Summary	Pablo Pérez 22'; Jony (yellow card) 55'; Dani Ndi (yellow card) 67'; Nacho Cases (yellow card) 93'	Stadium: El Sardinero; Attendance: 12,987; Referee: López Amaya

21 December 18	Real Sporting	2–1	Alcorcón	Gijón
17:00	Bernardo (yellow card) 15'; Jony 20' (yellow card) 20'; Isma López 29'	Summary	Fausto (yellow card) 6'; Guichón (yellow card) 44'; Óscar Plano (yellow card) 63' (yellow-red card) 89'; Héctor Verdés (yellow card) 74'; Nagore (yellow card) 75'; Anderson 78'	Stadium: El Molinón; Attendance: 22,076; Referee: Muñoz Mayordomo

4 January 19	Tenerife	1–1	Real Sporting	Santa Cruz de Tenerife
19:00	Ifrán 14'; Vitolo (yellow card) 69'; Hugo Álvarez (yellow card) 89'	Summary	Guerrero (yellow card) 19'; Luis Hernández (yellow card) 33'; Dani Ndi 50'; Pablo Pérez (yellow card) 89'	Stadium: Heliodoro Rodríguez López; Attendance: 9,594; Referee: Sagués Oscoz

11 January 20	Sabadell	2–2	Real Sporting	Sabadell
17:00	Hidalgo (yellow card) 8'; Carlos Hernández (yellow card) 16'; Eguaras (yellow card) 24'; Collantes 39'; Riau (yellow card) 61'; Javi Hervás 80'	Summary	Guerrero 6'; Pablo Pérez 20'; Carmona (yellow card) 67'; Sergio Álvarez (yellow card) 73'	Stadium: Nova Creu Alta; Attendance: 4,349; Referee: Sureda Cuenca

18 January 21	Real Sporting	1–2	Betis	Gijón
12:00	Juan Muñiz 4' (yellow card) 44'; Luis Hernández (yellow card) 57'	Summary	Jorge Molina (yellow card) 24'; Bruno 51'; Xavi Torres 64' (yellow card) 76'; Cejudo (yellow card) 65'; Jordi Figueras (yellow card) 66'; Lolo Reyes (yellow card) 89'	Stadium: El Molinón; Attendance: 20,095; Referee: Valdés Aller

25 January 22	Real Sporting	3–0	Numancia	Gijón
17:00	Nacho Cases (yellow card) 30'; Jony 55'; Bernardo 73'; Pablo Pérez 84'; Luis Hernández (yellow card) 87'	Summary	Natalio (yellow card) 35'; Dani Calvo (yellow card) 73'; Ripa (yellow card) 73'; Pedraza (yellow card) 87'	Stadium: El Molinón; Attendance: 17,508; Referee: Arcediano Monescillo

31 January 23	Ponferradina	0–2	Real Sporting	Ponferrada
18:00	Jonathan (yellow card) 27'; Alan Baró (yellow card) 73'; Yuri (yellow card) 88'; Gaztañaga (yellow card) 90'	Summary	Nacho Cases 17' (yellow card) 34'; Isma López 48'; Lora (yellow card) 58'; Guerrero (yellow card) 69'	Stadium: El Toralín; Referee: Ricardo de Burgos Bengoetxea

8 February 24	Real Sporting	2–1	Albacete	Gijón
17:00	Carlos Castro 56'; Bernardo (yellow card) 76'; Isma López (yellow card) 80'; Jony 87'	Summary	Gonzalo (yellow card) 10'; Samu 47'	Stadium: El Molinón; Attendance: 17,802; Referee: José Luis Munuera Montero

15 February 25	Girona	0–0	Real Sporting	Girona
12:00	Richy (yellow card) 20'	Summary	Guerrero (yellow card) 90+5'	Stadium: Montilivi; Attendance: 5,425; Referee: Pizarro Gómez

22 February 26	Real Sporting	4–1	Mirandés	Gijón
17:00	Carlos Castro 10', 71'; Carmona 14'; Álex Barrera 89'	Summary	Álex Ortiz (yellow card) 46'; Urko Vera 54'; Fran Carnicer (red card) 71'	Stadium: El Molinón; Attendance: 17,801; Referee: Sureda Cuenca

28 February 27	Valladolid	3–0	Real Sporting	Valladolid
18:00	Hernán Pérez 15'; Óscar 25'; Álvaro Rubio (yellow card) 35'; Timor 80'	Summary	Sergio Álvarez (yellow card) 21'	Stadium: José Zorrilla; Attendance: 14,615; Referee: Ocón Arraiz

8 March 28	Real Sporting	1–1	Las Palmas	Gijón
19:00	Mandi (yellow card) 26'; Guerrero (yellow card) 42'; Juan Muñiz 62' (pen.); Jony (yellow card) 68'; Alberto (yellow card) 73'; Isma López (yellow card) 87'	Summary	David García (yellow card) 63'; Vicente (yellow card) 64'; Aythami 73'	Stadium: El Molinón; Attendance: 26,740; Referee: López Amaya

14 March 29	Leganés	0–1	Real Sporting	Leganés
18:00	Eraso (yellow card) 27'; Chuli (yellow card) 51'; Postigo (yellow card) 56'; Borja Lázaro (yellow card) 83'	Summary	Velasco 12' (o.g.); Guerrero (yellow card) 19'; Mandi (yellow card) 74'; Alberto (yellow card) 87'	Stadium: Butarque; Attendance: 7,320; Referee: De la Fuente Ramos

22 March 30	Real Sporting	1–1	Recreativo de Huelva	Gijón
17:00	Guerrero 18'; Carmona (yellow card) 52'; Juan Muñiz (yellow card) 81'	Summary	Antonio Domínguez 25'; Montoro (yellow card) 36'; Álvaro Antón (yellow card) 38'; Menosse (yellow card) 45'; Víctor Díaz (yellow card) 62'; Braulio (yellow card) 73'; Manu Molina (yellow card) 81'; Córcoles (yellow card) 90'	Stadium: El Molinón; Attendance: 24,302; Referee: Lesma López

29 March 31	Osasuna	0–0	Real Sporting	Pamplona
12:00	Merino (yellow card) 36'; Roberto Torres (yellow card) 37'; Javier Flaño (yellow card) 79'; Olavide (yellow card) 89'	Summary	Isma López (yellow card) 54'; Álex Menéndez (yellow card) 73'	Stadium: El Sadar; Attendance: 14,530; Referee: Figueroa Vázquez

5 April 32	Real Sporting	0–0	Barcelona B	Gijón
17:00	Bernardo (yellow card) 21'; Guerrero (yellow card) 24'; Sergio Álvarez (yellow card) 77'	Summary	Patric (yellow card) 21'; Sergi Samper (yellow card) 24'; Gumbau (yellow card) 29'; Joan Román	Stadium: El Molinón; Attendance: 20,020; Referee: Trujillo Suárez

11 April 33	Zaragoza	1–1	Real Sporting	Zaragoza
18:00	Ruiz de Galarreta (yellow card) 6'; Dorca (yellow card) 49' (goal) 54'	Summary	Carmona (yellow card) 18'; Meré (yellow card) 31'; Álex Menéndez (red card) 66'; Isma López 56'; Guerrero (yellow card) 57'	Stadium: La Romareda; Attendance: 18,000; Referee: Muñoz Mayordomo

18 April 34	Real Sporting	1–0	Alavés	Gijón
18:00	Luis Hernández (yellow card) 60'; Bernardo (yellow card) 63'; Meré (yellow card) 65'; Guerrero 80'; Isma López (yellow card) 89'	Summary	Laguardia (yellow card) 17'; Medina (yellow card) 42'; Sergio Llamas (yellow card) 54'; Manu García (yellow card) 72'; Despotović (yellow card) 81'; Toti (yellow card) 88'	Stadium: El Molinón; Attendance: 19,450; Referee: José María Sánchez Martínez

25 April 35	Llagostera	0–0	Real Sporting	Palamós
16:30	Pedro Alcalá (yellow card) 52'; Jesús Imaz (yellow card) 59'; Masó (red card) 85'	Summary	Alberto Lora (yellow card) 33'; Rachid (yellow card) 64'	Stadium: Palamós Costa Brava; Attendance: 3,126; Referee: José Luis Munuera Montero

3 May 36	Real Sporting	1–0	Mallorca	Gijón
17:00	Hugo Fraile (yellow card) 29' (goal) 45' (pen.); Carmona (yellow card) 89'	Summary	Bustos (yellow card) 8'; João Victor (yellow card) 28'; Truyols (yellow card) 44'; Riera (yellow card) 65'; Pau Cendrós (red card) 83'; Bigas (yellow card) 85'	Stadium: El Molinón; Attendance: 19,771; Referee: Pérez Pallás

9 May 37	Lugo	1–2	Real Sporting	Lugo
18:00	Manu (yellow card) 42' (penalty missed) 63'; Caballero 80'	Summary	Guerrero 9', 23'; Nacho Cases (yellow card) 12'; Jony (yellow card) 41'; Sergio Álvarez (yellow card) 47'; Álex Menéndez (yellow card) 52'; Luis Hernández (yellow card) 63'	Stadium: Anxo Carro; Attendance: 6,600; Referee: Ocón Arraiz

16 May 38	Real Sporting	3–1	Racing de Santander	Gijón
18:00	Guerrero 17', 67'; Rachid (yellow card) 22'; Isma López (yellow card) 40'; Lora (yellow card) 41'; Bernardo 62'; Nacho Cases (yellow card) 64'	Summary	Juanpe 11'; Quique González (yellow card) 28'; Iñaki (yellow card) 83'	Stadium: El Molinón; Attendance: 23,070; Referee: Eiriz Mata

20 May 39	Alcorcón	0–0	Real Sporting	Alcorcón
20:00	Chema (yellow card) 77'; Bellvís (yellow card) 91'	Summary	Lora (yellow card) 58'; Álex Menéndez (yellow card) 77'	Stadium: Santo Domingo; Attendance: 4,293; Referee: Sagués Oscoz

24 May 40	Real Sporting	2–0	Tenerife	Gijón
18:00	Isma López 44' (yellow card) 56'; Carlos Castro 65'	Summary	Ricardo León (yellow card) 75'	Stadium: El Molinón; Attendance: 25,610; Referee: Ricardo de Burgos Bengoetxea

31 May 41	Real Sporting	2–0	Sabadell	Gijón
18:00	Carlos Castro 22'; Nacho Cases 30'; Bernardo (yellow card) 35'; Rachid (yellow card) 78'	Summary	Gato (yellow card) 57'; Kiko Olivas (yellow card) 73'; Sotan (yellow card) 89'	Stadium: El Molinón; Attendance: 26,783; Referee: Sureda Cuenca

7 June 42	Betis	0–3	Real Sporting	Seville
18:00		Summary	Guerrero 24'; Jony 60'; Isma López 68'	Stadium: Benito Villamarín; Attendance: 26,301; Referee: Lesma López

=== Copa del Rey ===
10 September Second round	Real Sporting	1–3	Valladolid	El Molinón, Gijón
20:00	Mandi (yellow card) 54'; Jony 64'	Summary	Timor 22'; Mojica (yellow card) 35'; Sastre (yellow card) 44'; Alfaro 58'; Xavi Carmona (yellow card) 68'; Samuel 73'	Attendance: 9,200; Referee: Ricardo de Burgos Bengoetxea

== Statistics ==
=== Appearances and goals ===
No.	Pos	Nat	Player	Total		Segunda División		Copa del Rey	
No.	Pos	Nat	Player	Apps	Goals	Apps	Goals	Apps	Goals
1	GK	(Spain) ESP	Iván Cuéllar	36	0	36+0	0	0+0	0
2	DF	(Spain) ESP	Luis Hernández	42	0	41+0	0	1+0	0
3	DF	(Spain) ESP	Álex Menéndez	24	0	22+2	0	0+0	0
4	MF	(Spain) ESP	Mandi	11	0	7+3	0	1+0	0
5	DF	(Colombia) COL	Bernardo Espinosa	41	3	41+0	3	0+0	0
6	MF	(Spain) ESP	Sergio Álvarez	40	3	40+0	3	0+0	0
7	MF	(Spain) ESP	Juan Muñiz	28	3	9+18	3	1+0	0
8	MF	(Spain) ESP	Álex Barrera	11	1	4+7	1	0+0	0
9	FW	(Spain) ESP	Miguel Ángel Guerrero	37	11	32+4	11	0+1	0
10	MF	(Spain) ESP	Nacho Cases	33	2	31+2	2	0+0	0
11	MF	(Spain) ESP	Alberto Lora	41	1	40+0	1	1+0	0
13	GK	(Spain) ESP	Alberto García	8	0	6+1	0	1+0	0
14	DF	(Spain) ESP	Iván Hernández	0	0	0+0	0	0+0	0
15	FW	(Spain) ESP	Álex Serrano	3	0	0+2	0	0+1	0
16	FW	(Spain) ESP	Carlos Castro	31	9	11+19	9	1+0	0
17	MF	(Spain) ESP	Santi Jara	14	0	1+13	0	0+0	0
18	FW	(Spain) ESP	Isma López	26	5	23+2	5	1+0	0
19	MF	(Spain) ESP	Carlos Carmona	38	2	30+8	2	0+0	0
20	DF	(Spain) ESP	Julio Rodríguez	1	0	0+0	0	1+0	0
21	FW	(Spain) ESP	Hugo Fraile	10	1	6+4	1	0+0	0
23	MF	(Spain) ESP	Jony	42	7	38+3	6	0+1	1
28	DF	(Spain) ESP	Jorge Meré	5	0	4+1	0	0+0	0
29	MF	(Algeria) ALG	Rachid Aït-Atmane	16	0	6+9	0	1+0	0
30	MF	(Spain) ESP	Pablo Pérez	36	7	17+18	7	1+0	0
32	FW	(Spain) ESP	Álvaro Bustos	1	0	0+0	0	1+0	0
33	MF	(Cameroon) CMR	Dani Ndi	21	1	17+4	1	0+0	0

=== Disciplinary record ===
N	P	Nat.	Name	2ª División			Copa del Rey			Total			Notes
N	P	Nat.	Name	Yellow card	Second yellow card	Red card	Yellow card	Second yellow card	Red card	Yellow card	Second yellow card	Red card	Notes
3	DF	(Spain)	Álex Menéndez	6	2					6	2		
7	MF	(Spain)	Juan Muñiz	5	1					5	1		
6	MF	(Spain)	Sergio Álvarez	10						10			
9	FW	(Spain)	Miguel Ángel Guerrero	9						9			
10	MF	(Spain)	Nacho Cases	8						8			
19	MF	(Spain)	Carlos Carmona	8						8			
5	DF	(Colombia)	Bernardo Espinosa	7						7			2 times captain
18	FW	(Spain)	Isma López	7						7			
2	DF	(Spain)	Luis Hernández	6						6			
11	MF	(Spain)	Alberto Lora	6						6			40 times captain
23	MF	(Spain)	Jony	6						6			
30	MF	(Spain)	Pablo Pérez	4			1			5			
29	MF	(Algeria)	Rachid Aït-Atmane	4						4			
4	MF	(Spain)	Mandi	2			1			3			
13	GK	(Spain)	Alberto García	3						3			
33	MF	(Cameroon)	Dani Ndi	3						3			One yellow card retired
1	GK	(Spain)	Iván Cuéllar	2						2			
28	DF	(Spain)	Jorge Meré	2						2			
8	MF	(Spain)	Álex Barrera	1						1			
14	DF	(Spain)	Iván Hernández	1						1			
15	FW	(Spain)	Álex Serrano	1						1			
17	FW	(Spain)	Santi Jara	1						1			
21	FW	(Spain)	Hugo Fraile	1						1			
16	FW	(Spain)	Carlos Castro										
20	DF	(Spain)	Julio Rodríguez										

Source: Competitive matches and RFEF.es
Ordered by (red card) , (second yellow card) and (yellow card)
(yellow card) = Number of bookings; (second yellow card) = Number of sending offs after a second yellow card; (red card) = Number of sending offs by a direct red card.

== See also ==
- 2014–15 Segunda División
- 2014–15 Copa del Rey
