= Óscar Fernández =

Óscar Fernández may refer to:

== Footballers ==
- Óscar Fernández Moraleda (born 1971), Spanish retired footballer in the 2002–03 Sporting de Gijón season
- Óscar Fernández (football manager, born 1974), Spanish football manager
- Óscar Fernández (football manager, born 1987), Spanish football manager for FC Juárez (women)
- Óscar Fernández (Mexican footballer) (born 1987), Mexican football striker
- Óscar Fernández (footballer, born 1995), Spanish football winger for SD Logroñés

== Other sports ==
- Oscar Fernández (fencer) (born 1962), Spanish fencer
- Óscar Fernández (athlete) (born 1974), Spanish long-distance runner
- Óscar Fernández (judoka) (born 1978), Spanish judoka
- Óscar Fernández (racing driver), Spanish racing driver noted for driving the Sun Red SR21
- Óscar Fernández (sprinter), Peruvian track and field sprinter who shares the Peruvian record in athletics in the 4 × 100 m relay

== Others ==
- Oscar Lorenzo Fernández (1897–1948), Brazilian composer
- Óscar Fernández Guillén (born 1949), Costa Rican prelate of the Roman Catholic Church
- Oscar Fernandez-Taranco (born 1957), Argentine assistant secretary-general of the United Nations
- Óscar Fernández (politician) (born 1975 or 1976), Spanish politician
