= Moi Gómez =

Spanish footballer (born 1994)

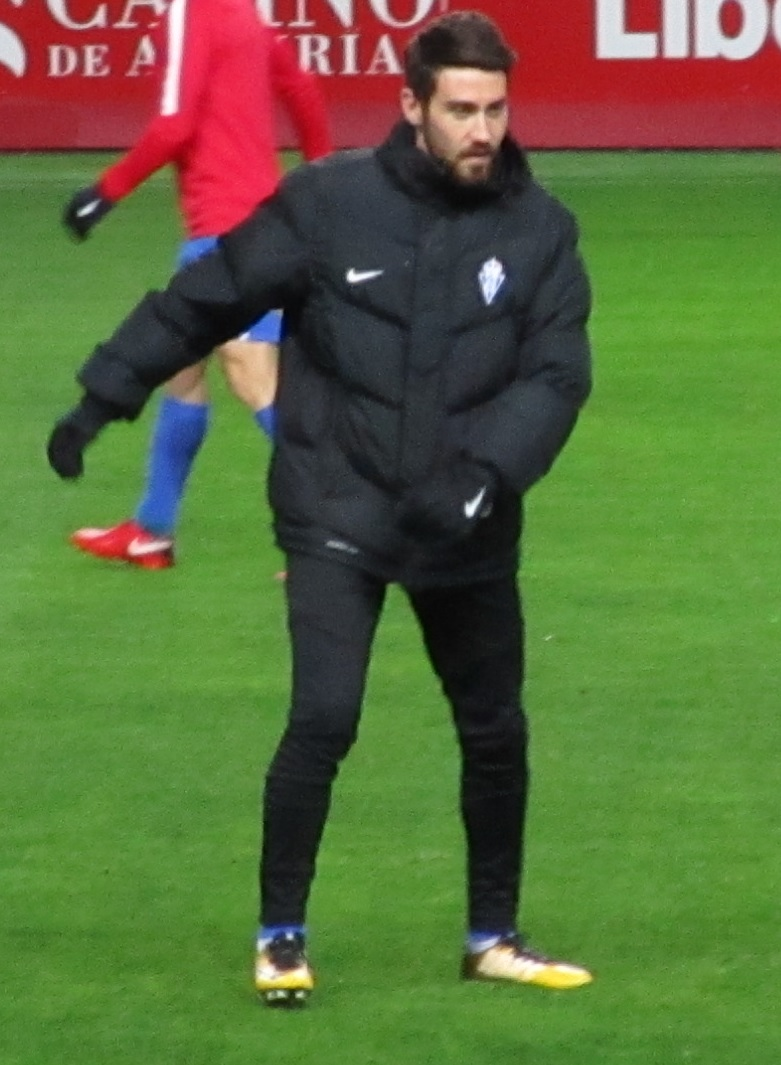
- Gómez with Sporting Gijón in 2017

Personal information
- Full name: Moisés Gómez Bordonado
- Date of birth: 23 June 1994 (age 32)
- Place of birth: Rojales, Spain
- Height: 1.76 m (5 ft 9 1/2 in)
- Position: Attacking midfielder

Team information
- Current team: Osasuna
- Number: 16

Youth career
- 2009–2010: Alicante
- 2010–2011: Villarreal

Senior career*
Years	Team	Apps	(Gls)
2011	Villarreal C	7	(3)
2011–2013	Villarreal B	33	(4)
2011–2016	Villarreal	76	(7)
2015–2016	→ Getafe (loan)	22	(2)
2016–2019	Sporting Gijón	47	(3)
2018–2019	→ Huesca (loan)	53	(3)
2019–2022	Villarreal	101	(11)
2022–	Osasuna	122	(6)

International career
2009	Spain U16	3	(0)
2011	Spain U17	3	(1)
2012	Spain U18	2	(0)
2013	Spain U19	8	(1)
2014–2015	Spain U21	3	(1)
- * Club domestic league appearances and goals as of 01:19, 8 November 2026 (UTC)

Moisés 'Moi' Gómez Bordonado (born 23 June 1994) is a Spanish professional footballer who plays as an attacking midfielder for La Liga club Osasuna.

== Club career ==
Born in Rojales, Alicante, Valencian Community, Gómez began his youth career with local Alicante CF, finishing it with neighbours Villarreal CF. On 30 April 2011, two months shy of his 17th birthday, he made his senior debut for the club's B team, against Gimnàstic de Tarragona in the Segunda División.

On 28 November 2011, Gómez played his first official game with the main squad – also his La Liga debut – coming on as a substitute for Jonathan de Guzmán in a 2–1 away defeat to Málaga CF. He scored his first goal as a professional the following 25 February, helping to a 2–0 win at CD Guadalajara; both Villarreal teams, however, were relegated at the end of the season – the B's finished in 12th position, but were forced to drop down a level nonetheless.

Gómez contributed 24 matches and one goal in the 2012–13 campaign, as the Yellow Submarine was immediately promoted. He signed a new five-year contract in August 2013, and scored his first goal in the top tier on 13 January 2014 in the 5–1 home win over Real Sociedad.

On 9 July 2015, Gómez was loaned to Getafe CF in the same league on a season-long deal. One year later, after suffering relegation, he agreed to a permanent four-year contract with Sporting de Gijón also of the top flight.

On 26 January 2018, Gómez moved to second-division leaders SD Huesca on loan. He and his teammates eventually achieved promotion, and the deal was extended for another season.

Gómez returned to his first club Villarreal on 18 July 2019, signing a four-year contract for a rumoured fee of €1.3 million. His debut came a month later, when he started and scored once in a 4–4 home draw with Granada CF.

Gómez made 11 appearances in his side's victorious run in the 2020–21 UEFA Europa League. This included 43 minutes of the final against Manchester United.

On 28 July 2022, Gómez joined CA Osasuna on a five-year deal for €1.8 million; an additional €100,000 bonus was added to this fee, for every season the team remained in the main division.

== International career ==
Gómez represented Spain at youth level. He made his debut for the under-21 side on 12 November 2014, playing the first half of a 4–1 home loss against Belgium in Ferrol. He scored his only goal on 30 March 2015 in another friendly, the 4–0 victory over Belarus in León.

== Career statistics ==
As of match played 29 June 2023

Appearances and goals by club, season and competition
Club	Season	League			National Cup		Continental		Other		Total	
Club	Season	Division	Apps	Goals	Apps	Goals	Apps	Goals	Apps	Goals	Apps	Goals
Villarreal B	2010–11	Segunda División	1	0	—		—		—		1	0
Villarreal B	2011–12	Segunda División	23	4	—		—		—		23	4
Villarreal B	2012–13	Segunda División B	4	0	—		—		—		4	0
Villarreal B	2013–14	Segunda División B	5	0	—		—		—		5	0
Villarreal B	Total		33	4	0	0	0	0	0	0	33	4
Villarreal	2011–12	La Liga	2	0	0	0	—		—		2	0
Villarreal	2012–13	Segunda División	24	1	1	0	—		—		25	1
Villarreal	2013–14	La Liga	19	2	4	0	—		—		23	2
Villarreal	2014–15	La Liga	31	4	7	0	6 (Note: Appearances in UEFA Europa League)	0	—		44	4
Villarreal	Total		76	7	12	0	6	0	0	0	94	7
Getafe (loan)	2015–16	La Liga	22	2	2	0	—		—		24	2
Sporting Gijón	2016–17	La Liga	26	2	0	0	—		—		26	2
Sporting Gijón	2017–18	Segunda División	21	1	2	0	—		—		23	1
Sporting Gijón	Total		47	3	2	0	0	0	0	0	49	3
Huesca (loan)	2017–18	Segunda División	17	1	0	0	—		—		17	1
Huesca (loan)	2018–19	La Liga	36	2	0	0	—		—		36	2
Huesca (loan)	Total		53	3	0	0	0	0	0	0	53	3
Villarreal	2019–20	La Liga	37	5	4	0	—		—		41	5
Villarreal	2020–21	La Liga	35	4	3	0	11	0	—		49	4
Villarreal	2021–22	La Liga	29	2	2	1	6 (Note: Appearances in UEFA Champions League)	0	1 (Note: Appearance in UEFA Super Cup)	0	38	3
Villarreal	Total		101	11	9	1	17	0	1	0	128	12
Osasuna	2022–23	La Liga	33	3	5	0	—		—		38	3
Career total			365	33	30	1	23	0	1	0	419	34

== Honours ==
Villarreal

- UEFA Europa League: 2020–21

Osasuna

- Copa del Rey runner-up: 2022–23
