= Dani Ndi =

Cameroonian footballer

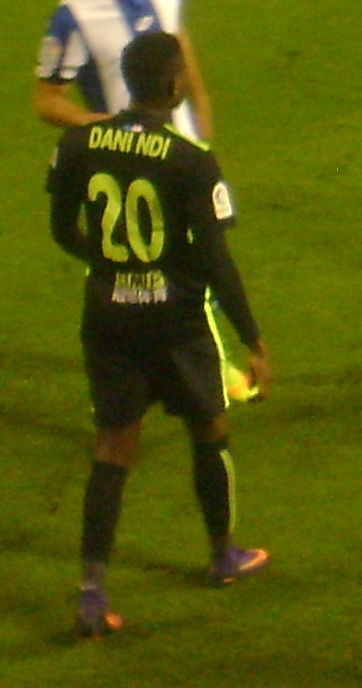

Personal information
- Full name: Daniel Arnaud Ndi
- Date of birth: 18 August 1995 (age 31)
- Place of birth: Douala, Cameroon
- Height: 1.78 m (5 ft 10 in)
- Position: Attacking midfielder

Team information
- Current team: Grindavík (loan)
- Number: 33

Youth career
- Daga Young Stars
- 2011: Colmenar Viejo
- 2011–2014: Sporting Gijón
- 2011–2013: → Llano 2000 (loan)

Senior career*
Years	Team	Apps	(Gls)
2013–2014	Sporting B	17	(1)
2014–2017	Sporting Gijón	42	(2)
2018	Mallorca	11	(0)
2019	Istra 1961	11	(2)
2019–2021	Villarrobledo	24	(1)
2022	Talavera	7	(0)
2024–	Víkingur Ólafsvík	10	(2)
2024–	→ Grindavík (loan)	9	(2)

International career^{‡}
- Cameroon U15
2011	Cameroon U17		
2015–	Cameroon	4	(0)
- * Club domestic league appearances and goals as of 2 November 2024 ‡ National team caps and goals as of 9 June 2015

Daniel Arnaud Ndi (born 18 August 1995) is a Cameroonian footballer who plays as an attacking midfielder for Grindavík, on loan from Víkingur Ólafsvík.

== Club career ==
Born in Douala, Ndi left his homeland in 2009, aged 14, trialling in Austria and England for six months. He also had a trial period at Manchester United F.C., but nothing came of it.

Ndi subsequently joined local Daga Young Stars FC, but after a trip to Spain with Cameroon under-17s, signed for AD Colmenar Viejo. He subsequently left the club and moved to Sporting de Gijón, initially playing for lowly SD Llano 2000 due to being a non-EU player.

Ndi subsequently returned to Sporting in the 2013 summer, and made his debuts as a senior in the 2013–14 campaign, while still a youth, with the B-team in Segunda División B. In July 2014 he was called up to the main squad for the pre-season.

Ndi played his first match as a professional on 26 October 2014, replacing Miguel Ángel Guerrero in the 75th minute of a 2–0 home win against CA Osasuna in the Segunda División championship. He scored his first goal on 4 January of the following year, netting the last in a 1–1 away draw against CD Tenerife.

In April 2015, despite having one year left in his youth contract, Ndi returned to Cameroon after being advised by his agent Olivier Noah to do so, thus choosing not to return to Gijón. Noah later told Vicente González-Villamil, Ndi's representative in Spain, that he would not return to Sporting due to his low annual earnings. On 13 April, however, he returned to the club, but did not appear neither for the main squad nor the reserves during the remainder of the campaign.

On 11 November 2015, after expressing his apologies to the club and replacing his agent, Ndi extended his contract with Sporting until 2018. He made his La Liga debut seventeen days later, starting in a 1–2 away loss against Celta de Vigo. However, the club terminated his contract on 1 September 2017.

On 12 February 2018, after more than five months without a team, Ndi signed a two-season contract with RCD Mallorca in the third division. However, in July 2018, after the team promotion to the second division, Mallorca terminated his contract. At beginning of 2019 Ndi joined Croatian outfit NK Istra 1961 on free transfer.

At the end of November 2019, Ndi moved to CP Villarrobledo.

== International career ==
After appearing with the under-15s and under-17s, Ndi was called up to the full side on 12 March 2015. He made his international debut on the 25th, starting and playing 75 minutes in a 1–0 friendly win against Indonesia.

== Career statistics ==
=== International ===
As of 9 June 2015

Cameroon
Year	Apps	Goals
2015	4	0
Total	4	0
