= Álvaro Bustos =

Spanish footballer (born 1995)

Personal information
- Full name: Álvaro Bustos Sandoval
- Date of birth: 26 June 1995 (age 31)
- Place of birth: Gijón, Spain
- Height: 1.73 m (5 ft 8 in)
- Position: Winger

Team information
- Current team: Murcia
- Number: 11

Youth career
- Sporting Gijón

Senior career*
Years	Team	Apps	(Gls)
2012–2016	Sporting B	78	(3)
2014–2017	Sporting Gijón	0	(0)
2016–2017	→ Mirandés (loan)	26	(2)
2017–2018	Gimnàstic	4	(0)
2018–2019	Mallorca	14	(2)
2018–2019	→ Rayo Majadahonda (loan)	0	(0)
2019	→ Pontevedra (loan)	12	(2)
2019–2020	Pontevedra	28	(6)
2020–2022	Racing Santander	53	(7)
2022–2024	Alcorcón	43	(7)
2024	Recreativo Huelva	17	(2)
2024–2025	Ponferradina	33	(10)
2025–	Murcia	26	(3)

International career
2011	Spain U16	5	(1)
2011–2012	Spain U17	7	(2)
2013	Spain U18	2	(0)
2014	Spain U19	2	(1)
2012	Spain U20	4	(1)
- * Club domestic league appearances and goals as of 10 June 2026

Álvaro Bustos Sandoval (born 26 June 1995), is a Spanish footballer who plays as a winger for Murcia.

== Club career ==
Born in Gijón, Asturias, Bustos graduated with Sporting de Gijón's youth setup. He made his senior debuts with the reserves in the 2011–12 campaign, aged only 16, in Segunda División B.

On 10 September 2014 Bustos made his professional debut, starting in a 1–3 home loss against Real Valladolid for the season's Copa del Rey. He continued to appear exclusively for the B's, however.

On 4 August 2016, Bustos was loaned to Segunda División club CD Mirandés, in a season-long deal. He scored his first professional goals on 25 September, netting a double in a 3–2 home win against CD Tenerife.

On 27 July 2017, after suffering relegation, Bustos terminated his contract with Sporting. The following day, he signed a four-year contract with Gimnàstic de Tarragona, still in the second division.

Bustos joined RCD Mallorca in January 2018. After achieving promotion to the second division, he served loan stints at CF Rayo Majadahonda and Pontevedra CF before joining the latter club permanently on 14 July 2019.

On 15 August 2020, Bustos agreed to a two-year contract with Racing de Santander, recently relegated to the third division. On 15 July 2022, after achieving promotion back to the second level, he moved to AD Alcorcón.

On 31 January 2024, after losing his starting spot, Bustos terminated his contract with Alkor.

On 31 July 2024, Bustos signed with Ponferradina in Primera Federación. On 13 July 2025, Bustos moved to Murcia in the same division.

== Career statistics ==
As of match played 13 March 2021

Appearances and goals by club, season and competition
Club	Season	League			National Cup		Other		Total	
Club	Season	Division	Apps	Goals	Apps	Goals	Apps	Goals	Apps	Goals
Sporting Gijón II	2011–12	Segunda División B	1	0	—		—		1	0
Sporting Gijón II	2012–13	Segunda División B	21	0	—		—		21	0
Sporting Gijón II	2013–14	Segunda División B	16	1	—		—		16	1
Sporting Gijón II	2014–15	Segunda División B	12	1	—		—		12	1
Sporting Gijón II	2015–16	Segunda División B	28	1	—		—		28	1
Sporting Gijón II	Total		78	3	—		—		78	1
Sporting Gijón	2014–15	Segunda División	0	0	1	0	—		1	0
Mirandés (loan)	2016–17	Segunda División	26	2	1	0	—		27	2
Gimnàstic	2017–18	Segunda División	4	0	0	0	—		4	0
Mallorca	2017–18	Segunda División B	14	2	—		4 (Note: Appearance(s) in Promotion Playoffs)	0	18	2
Mallorca	2018–19	Segunda División	0	0	—		—		0	0
Mallorca	Total		14	2	—		4	0	18	2
Rayo Majadahonda (loan)	2018–19	Segunda División	0	0	0	0	—		0	0
Pontevedra (loan)	2018–19	Segunda División B	12	2	—		—		12	2
Pontevedra	2019–20	Segunda División B	28	6	1	0	—		29	6
Pontevedra	Total		40	8	1	0	—		41	8
Racing Santander	2020–21	Segunda División B	16	3	0	0	—		16	3
Career total			178	18	3	0	4	0	185	18
