= Rachid Aït-Atmane =

Algerian footballer (born 1993)

Rachid Aït-Atmane ⵔⴰⵙⵀⵉⴷ ⴰⵉⵜ ⴰⵜⵎⴰⵏⴻ
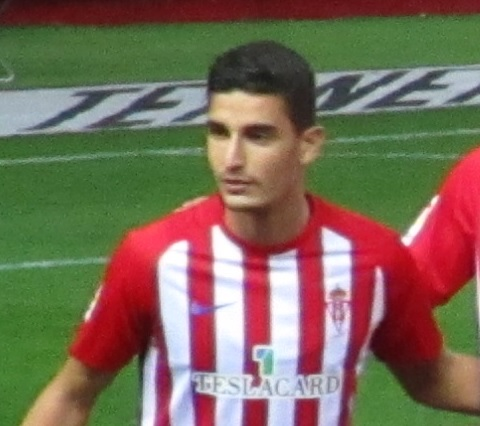
- Aït-Atmane with Sporting Gijón in 2017

Personal information
- Full name: Rachid Aït-Atmane
- Date of birth: 4 February 1993 (age 33)
- Place of birth: Bobigny, France
- Height: 1.90 m (6 ft 3 in)
- Position: Central midfielder

Youth career
- 2003–2010: Lens

Senior career*
Years	Team	Apps	(Gls)
2010–2013	Lens B	35	(1)
2013–2015	Sporting Atlético	35	(1)
2015–2018	Sporting Gijón	46	(0)
2017	→ Tenerife (loan)	5	(0)
2018	→ SK Beveren (loan)	7	(0)
2018–2019	Dinamo București	12	(0)
2019–2020	CS Sfaxien	8	(0)
2020–2021	Fujairah	8	(0)
2021	Xanthi		
2022	Al-Ahly Benghazi		
2023–2024	JS Kabylie	23	(1)
2025	Saham Club	8	(1)
2025	Forca Kochi	9	(0)

International career^{‡}
2015–2016	Algeria U23	3	(0)
- * Club domestic league appearances and goals as of 28 September 2026 ‡ National team caps and goals as of 7 August 2016

Rachid Aït-Atmane (Arabic: رشيد آيت عثمان; Tamazight: ⵔⴰⵙⵀⵉⴷ ⴰⵉⵜ ⴰⵜⵎⴰⵏⴻ; born 4 February 1993), known simply as Rachid (Tamazight: ⵔⴰⵙⵀⵉⴷ) in Spain, is a professional footballer who plays as a central midfielder. Born in France, he represented Algeria at youth level.

== Club career ==
Born in Bobigny from parents of Béjaïa, Kabylia, Aït-Atmane finished his formation with RC Lens' youth setup, and made his senior debuts with the reserves in the 2010–11 campaign, in the Championnat de France amateur. In June 2013 he moved abroad for the first time in his career, signing a two-year deal with Spanish side Sporting de Gijón and being assigned to the B-team of the Segunda División B.

Aït-Atmane played his first match as a professional on 23 August 2014, coming on as a second-half substitute in a 2–1 away success against CD Numancia in the Segunda División. On 10 July of the following year he renewed his contract until 2019, being definitely promoted to the main squad.

Aït-Atmane made his La Liga debut on 23 August 2015, coming on as a late substitute for Carlos Carmona in a 0–0 home draw against Real Madrid. In January 2017, he was loaned to CD Tenerife until the end of the 2016–17 season.

In January 2018, Aït-Atmane was loaned to Belgian side Waasland-Beveren. Upon returning, he terminated his contract on 31 August.

In November 2018, he signed a contract with Romanian club Dinamo București. He left the club in June 2019.

In January 2023, he joined JS Kabylie.

== International career ==
In November 2015, Aït-Atmane was called up to the Algerian under-23 national team for the first time for a friendly against Tunisia in preparation for the 2015 CAF U-23 Championship.

== Honours ==
CS Sfaxien

- Tunisian Super Cup runner-up: 2018–19
