= Luis Hernández (footballer, born 1989) =

Spanish footballer

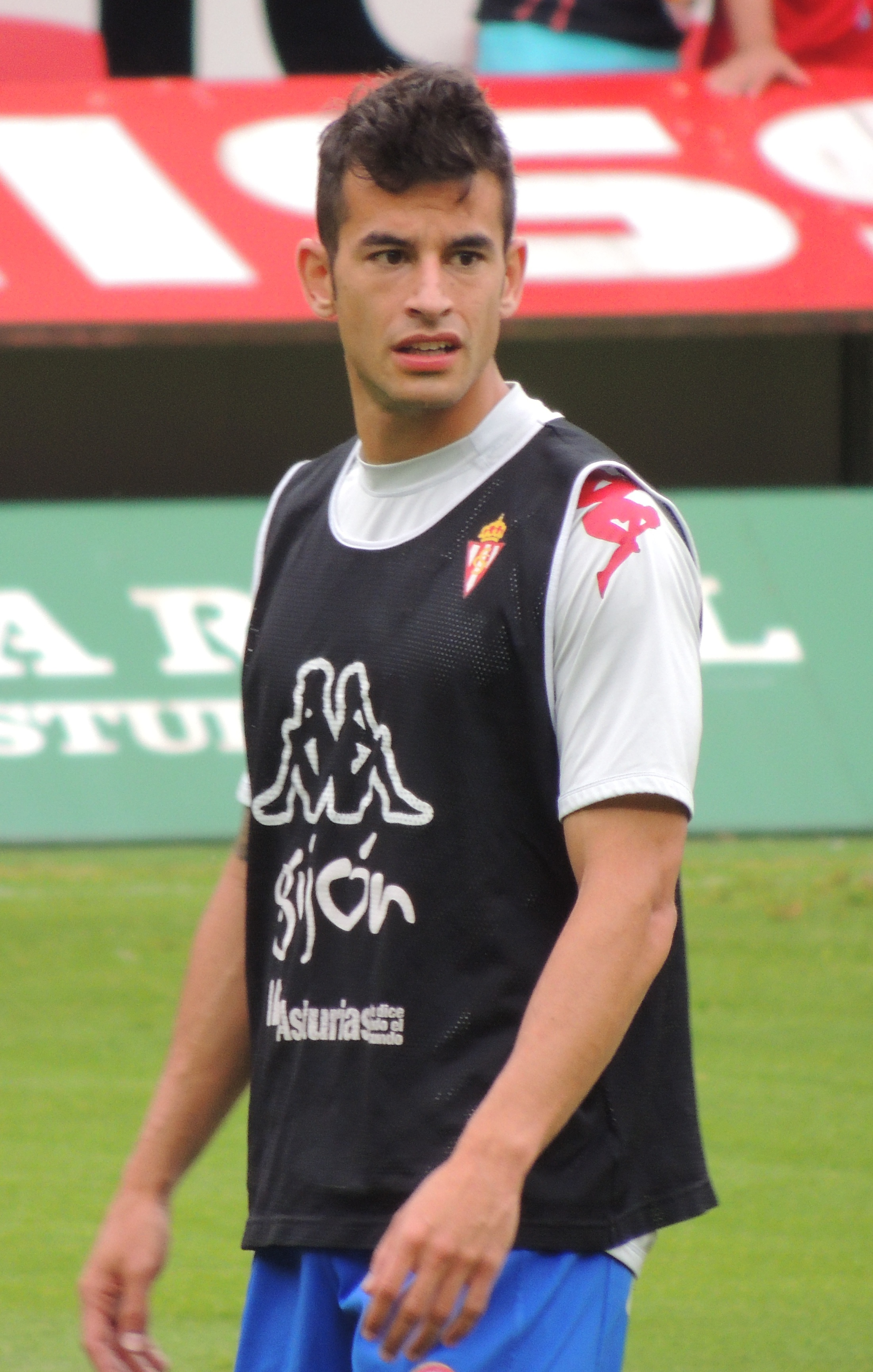
- Hernández warming up for Sporting Gijón in 2014

Personal information
- Full name: Luis Hernández Rodríguez
- Date of birth: 14 April 1989 (age 37)
- Place of birth: Madrid, Spain
- Height: 1.82 m (6 ft 0 in)
- Position: Centre-back

Youth career
- 1998–2007: Real Madrid

Senior career*
Years	Team	Apps	(Gls)
2007–2009	Real Madrid C	38	(3)
2009–2011	Real Madrid B	36	(3)
2012	Sporting Gijón B	11	(0)
2012–2016	Sporting Gijón	135	(1)
2016–2017	Leicester City	4	(0)
2017–2020	Málaga	110	(2)
2020–2022	Maccabi Tel Aviv	45	(2)
2022–2025	Cádiz	69	(2)
Total		448	(13)
- * Club domestic league appearances and goals

Luis Hernández Rodríguez (born 14 April 1989) is a Spanish former professional footballer who played as a centre-back.

He joined the Real Madrid academy as a nine-year-old, but never made an appearance for the senior team. He made his professional debut with Sporting de Gijón in 2012, playing 139 competitive matches and scoring one goal across four seasons. He then signed with Premier League club Leicester City, playing nine games before moving to Málaga in January 2017. In 2020 he joined Maccabi Tel Aviv and, two years later, returned to his country with Cádiz.

Over six seasons in La Liga, Hernández totalled 151 appearances and two goals.

== Club career ==
=== Early years ===
Born in Madrid, Hernández finished his formative years with hometown club Real Madrid, making his senior debuts by first representing the C and then the B team. In August 2011, he was expected to join Belgian Pro League side Gent but nothing came of it.

=== Sporting Gijón ===
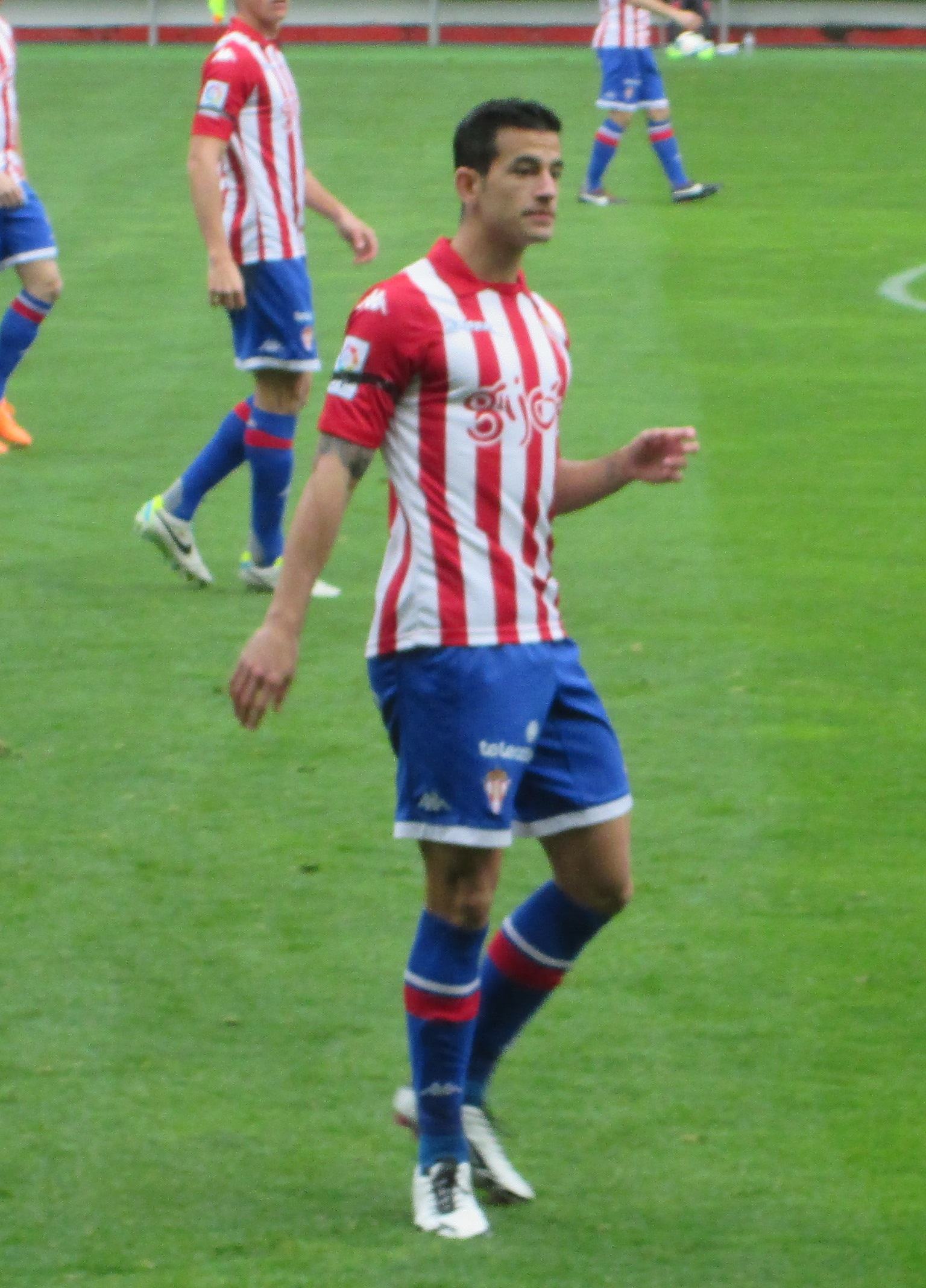
Hernández playing for Sporting Gijón in 2014

In January 2012, Hernández went on trial with Getafe B. However, he signed an 18-month deal with Sporting de Gijón instead, being assigned to the reserves in Segunda División B. On 2 September 2012, he made his professional debut in the Segunda División, playing the full 90 minutes in a 0–0 away draw against Racing de Santander.

On 31 January 2013, Hernández was promoted to the Asturians' first team alongside Borja López. He finished the season as an undisputed starter, appearing in 21 matches in all competitions.

Hernández was an ever-present figure in the following campaigns, playing 38 league games in 2013–14 and 41 in 2014–15. He scored his first goal for the team on 24 November 2013, netting their first in a 3–1 win at Lugo.

On 23 August 2015, Hernández made his La Liga debut, starting in a 0–0 home draw against Real Madrid. He made a total of 140 interceptions, more than any other player during the season, while Sporting barely survived relegation by a point.

=== Leicester City ===
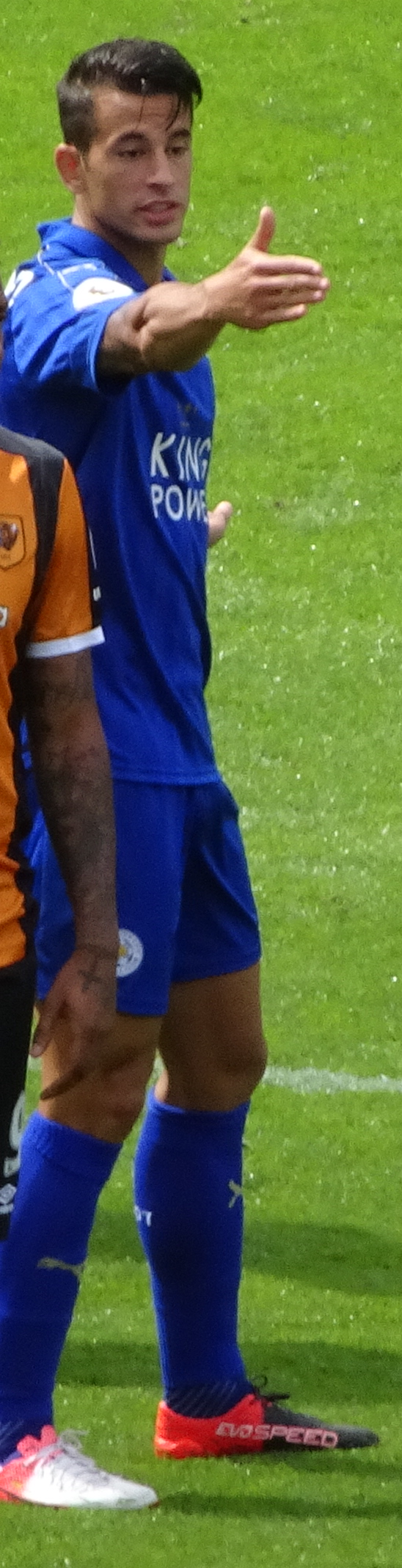
Hernández with Leicester City in August 2016

On 21 June 2016, Hernández signed for Premier League champions Leicester City in a free transfer on a four-year deal. He made his competitive debut on 7 August, coming on as a 63rd-minute substitute for Danny Simpson in a 2–1 loss against Manchester United in the FA Community Shield. His first appearance in the UEFA Champions League took place on 14 September, in a 3–0 group stage win at Club Brugge.

Hernández ultimately struggled to break into the first team in 2016–17, appearing mostly as an unused substitute. In January 2017, Málaga were reported to be in advanced talks with Leicester over a possible loan deal for the player.

=== Málaga ===
On 24 January 2017, after spending just six months in England, Hernández returned to Spain and its top level to join Málaga on a three-and-a-half-year deal for an undisclosed fee. He made his debut three days later in a 1–1 draw away to Osasuna, and scored his first goal for the club on 14 May in another away fixture, 2–2 against Real Sociedad.

Hernández scored his second goal for the team on 12 June 2019, in a 4–2 defeat to Deportivo de La Coruña in the first leg of the promotion play-offs semi-final. He also took part in the second match, a 1–0 loss.

Along with seven other first-team players, Hernández was released on 3 October 2020 due to a layoff.

=== Maccabi Tel Aviv ===
Hernández joined Maccabi Tel Aviv on 5 October 2020, agreeing to a one-year contract with an option to extend a further season. His team came runners-up in the Israeli Premier League in his first season, and he also scored in extra time to help them defeat Hapoel Tel Aviv 2–1 in the final of the State Cup.

=== Cádiz ===
On 31 January 2022, Hernández returned to Spain and its top tier after signing a 18-month deal with Cádiz. He suffered a knee injury in January 2024, one that forced him to retire in September of the following year aged 36.

== Career statistics ==
As of match played 4 June 2023

Appearances and goals by club, season and competition
Club	Season	League			National cup (Note: Appearances in Copa del Rey)		League cup		Continental		Other		Total	
Club	Season	Division	Apps	Goals	Apps	Goals	Apps	Goals	Apps	Goals	Apps	Goals	Apps	Goals
Real Madrid C	2008–09	Tercera División	38	3	—		—		—		—		38	3
Real Madrid B	2009–10	Segunda División B	25	3	—		—		—		—		25	3
Real Madrid B	2010–11	Segunda División B	11	0	—		—		—		—		11	0
Real Madrid B	Total		36	3	0	0	0	0	0	0	0	0	36	3
Sporting B	2011–12	Segunda División B	10	0	—		—		—		—		10	0
Sporting B	2012–13	Segunda División B	1	0	—		—		—		—		1	0
Sporting B	Total		11	0	0	0	0	0	0	0	0	0	11	0
Sporting Gijón	2012–13	Segunda División	20	0	1	0	—		—		—		21	0
Sporting Gijón	2013–14	Segunda División	38	1	1	0	—		—		—		39	1
Sporting Gijón	2014–15	Segunda División	41	0	1	0	—		—		—		42	0
Sporting Gijón	2015–16	La Liga	36	0	1	0	—		—		—		37	0
Sporting Gijón	Total		135	1	4	0	0	0	0	0	0	0	139	1
Leicester City	2016–17	Premier League	4	0	0	0	0	0	4 (Note: Appearances in UEFA Champions League)	0	1 (Note: Appearance in FA Community Shield)	0	9	0
Málaga	2016–17	La Liga	19	1	—		—		—		—		19	1
Málaga	2017–18	La Liga	36	0	2	0	—		—		—		38	0
Málaga	2018–19	Segunda División	24	0	0	0	—		—		2 (Note: Appearances in La Liga play-offs)	1	26	1
Málaga	2019–20	Segunda División	29	0	0	0	—		—		—		29	0
Málaga	2020–21	Segunda División	0	0	0	0	—		—		—		0	0
Málaga	Total		108	1	2	0	0	0	0	0	2	1	112	2
Maccabi Tel Aviv	2020–21	Israeli Premier League	31	1	3	1	—		8	0	—		43	2
Maccabi Tel Aviv	2021–22	Israeli Premier League	14	1	1	0	—		11	0	1 (Note: Appearance in Israel Super Cup)	0	26	1
Maccabi Tel Aviv	Total		45	2	4	1	—		19	0	1	0	69	3
Cádiz	2021–22	La Liga	16	0	1	0	—		—		—		17	0
Cádiz	2022–23	La Liga	35	0	1	0	—		—		—		36	0
Cádiz	Total		51	0	2	0	—		—		—		53	0
Career total			386	10	12	0	0	0	23	0	4	1	420	12
