= Vicente González-Villamil =

Spanish footballer and manager

Personal information
- Full name: Vicente González-Villamil Pérez
- Date of birth: 25 March 1947 (age 79)
- Place of birth: Oviedo, Spain
- Height: 1.78 m (5 ft 10 in)
- Position: Defender

Youth career
- Los Arcos
- 1962–1965: Tradecol

Senior career*
Years	Team	Apps	(Gls)
1965–1970	Oviedo B		
1970–1981	Oviedo	304	(1)
1970–1971	→ Langreo (loan)	39	(0)
Total		343	(1)

Managerial career
- 1981–1983: Oviedo (assistant)
- 1983–1984: Oviedo (youth)
- 1986–1989: Oviedo B
- 1989–1992: Avilés
- 1992–1995: Gimnástica Torrelavega
- 1995: Alcorcón
- 1995–1997: Marino
- 1997–1998: Gimnástica Torrelavega
- 1998: Burgos
- 2002–2003: Oviedo
- 2005: Cultural Leonesa
- 2006: Cádiz (assistant)
- * Club domestic league appearances and goals

Vicente González-Villamil Pérez (born 25 March 1947), simply known as Vicente, is a Spanish retired footballer who played as a defender, and a manager.

== Playing career ==
Born in Oviedo, Asturias, Vicente joined Real Oviedo in 1965, spending several seasons with the reserves in Tercera División. In the 1970 summer he was loaned to Segunda División's UP Langreo, in a season-long deal.

Vicente made his debut as a professional on 6 September 1970, playing the entire second half in a 1–0 home win against Córdoba CF. He featured in 39 matches during the campaign, as his side narrowly avoided relegation.

In the 1971 summer Vicente returned to Oviedo, also in the second level, and appeared regularly as his side were promoted to La Liga. He made his debut in the competition on 2 September 1972, playing the full 90 minutes in a 1–2 away loss against UD Las Palmas.

Vicente was subsequently a regular starter at the Carbayones, only scoring his first professional goal on 14 May 1978, netting the first in a 3–0 home success over Terrassa FC. He retired in 1981 at the age of 33 with the same team.

== Managerial career ==
Immediately after retiring Vicente started working as an assistant at his lifetime club Oviedo. He was also a manager of the club's youth sides, a member of the staff and a manager of the reserve team, respectively, before being appointed at Real Avilés in 1989.

Vicente managed the Blanquiazules in two seasons in the second level, being relegated in his second. He suffered the same fate with Gimnástica de Torrelavega and Club Marino de Luanco in Segunda División B, only being split by a spell at AD Alcorcón.

Vicente returned to Gimnástica in the 1997 summer, and after achieving a final 7th position, left the club. He was named Burgos CF manager in the following year, but his reign only lasted nine matches.

After three years at UD Las Palmas as a staff member Vicente returned to Oviedo, and was appointed at the helm of the main squad on 28 October 2002. He was sacked on 2 March of the following year, after 17 matches in charge.

In February 2005, Vicente replaced Carlos García Cantarero as manager of third-tier Cultural y Deportiva Leonesa. He later assisted Oli at the helm of Cádiz CF one division higher, until both were dismissed in November 2006.
