= Alberto García (Spanish footballer) =

Spanish footballer

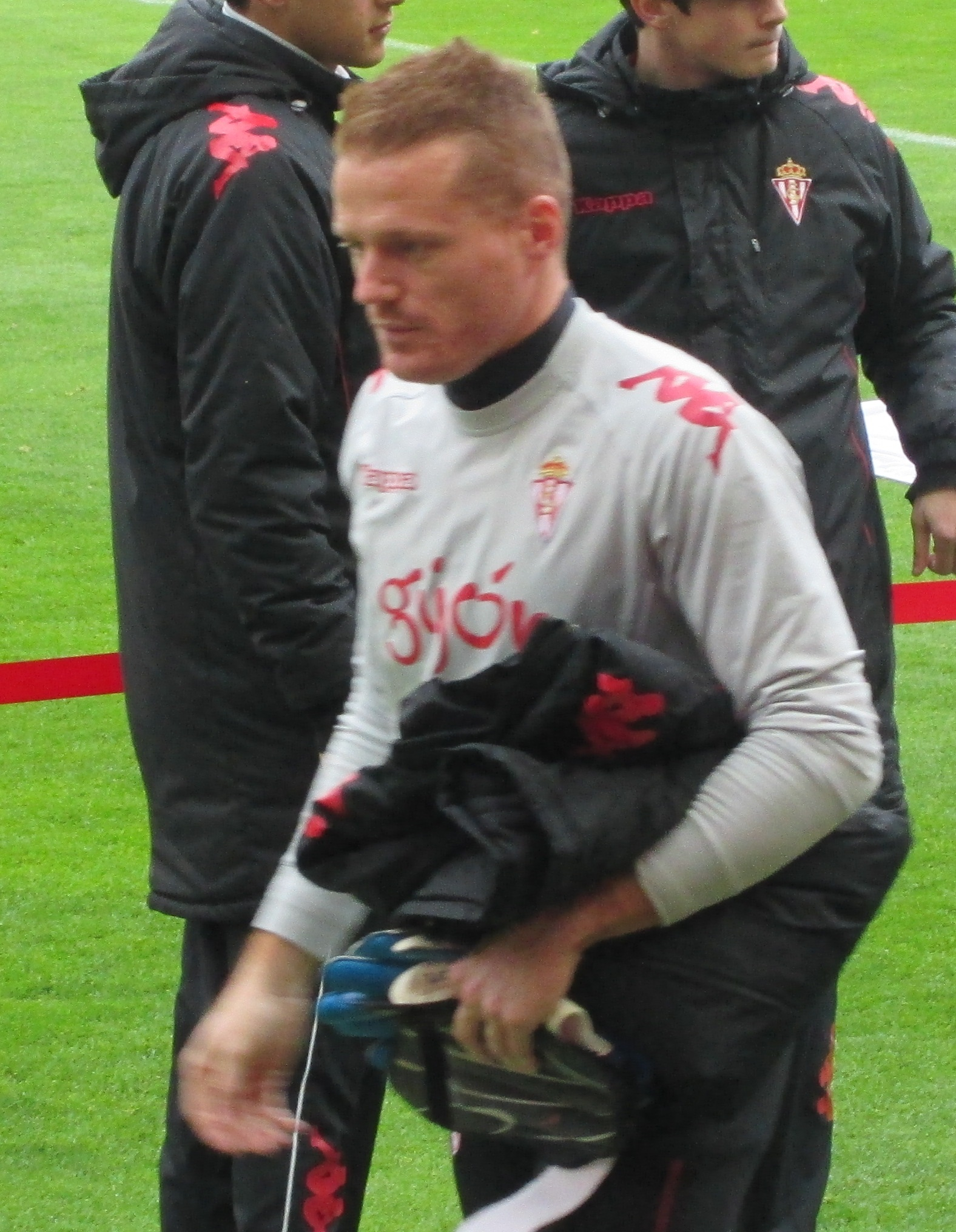
- García in 2014

Personal information
- Full name: Alberto García Cabrera
- Date of birth: 9 February 1985 (age 41)
- Place of birth: Barcelona, Spain
- Height: 1.81 m (5 ft 11 in)
- Position: Goalkeeper

Youth career
- 2001–2003: Barcelona
- 2003: Europa
- 2003–2004: Cornellà

Senior career*
Years	Team	Apps	(Gls)
2004	Rayo Majadahonda		
2005	Sant Andreu	14	(0)
2005–2006	Villarreal B	0	(0)
2006	→ Águilas (loan)	9	(0)
2006	Figueres	9	(0)
2007–2008	Murcia B	20	(0)
2008–2009	Murcia	7	(0)
2009–2013	Córdoba	107	(0)
2013–2016	Sporting Gijón	16	(0)
2016–2018	Getafe	34	(0)
2017–2018	→ Rayo Vallecano (loan)	41	(0)
2018–2021	Rayo Vallecano	24	(0)
Total		281	(0)
- * Club domestic league appearances and goals

Alberto García Cabrera (born 9 February 1985) is a Spanish former professional footballer who played as a goalkeeper.

== Club career ==
Born in Barcelona, Catalonia, García made his senior debut with CF Rayo Majadahonda in 2004. He went on to represent UE Sant Andreu, Villarreal CF B, Águilas CF and UE Figueres (the last two in the Segunda División B), before joining Real Murcia CF in summer 2007.

Initially assigned to the reserves in the Tercera División, García made his first-team – and La Liga – debut on 17 May 2008, starting in a 5–3 home loss against FC Barcelona as his team was already relegated. It was his only appearance of the season.

García was promoted to the main squad in June 2008, but was mainly used as a backup to Juan Elía. On 1 September 2009, he moved to fellow Segunda División club Córdoba CF, being more regularly utilised.

On 18 June 2013, García terminated his contract with the Andalusians and signed for four years with Sporting de Gijón hours later. On 15 July 2016, he moved to second-tier Getafe CF, agreeing to a two-year deal as a free agent.

On 13 July 2017, having lost his first-choice status to Vicente Guaita, García was loaned to Rayo Vallecano for one year, with an obligatory buyout clause in case of promotion. The following 1 July, he signed a permanent three-year contract with the club.

García announced his retirement at the age of 36, after nearly two years struggling with injuries.

== Career statistics ==
Appearances and goals by club, season and competition
Club	Season	League	League		National Cup		Other		Total	
Club	Season	League	Apps	Goals	Apps	Goals	Apps	Goals	Apps	Goals
Murcia B	2007–08	Tercera División	20	0	—		—		20	0
Murcia	2007–08	La Liga	1	0	0	0	—		1	0
Murcia	2008–09	Segunda División	6	0	0	0	—		6	0
Murcia	Total		7	0	0	0	—		7	0
Córdoba	2009–10	Segunda División	6	0	1	0	0	0	7	0
Córdoba	2010–11	Segunda División	25	0	6	0	—		31	0
Córdoba	2011–12	Segunda División	36	0	1	0	2 (Note: Appearances in La Liga play-offs)	0	39	0
Córdoba	2012–13	Segunda División	40	0	0	0	—		40	0
Córdoba	Total		107	0	8	0	2	0	117	0
Sporting Gijón	2013–14	Segunda División	3	0	1	0	0	0	4	0
Sporting Gijón	2014–15	Segunda División	7	0	1	0	—		8	0
Sporting Gijón	2015–16	La Liga	6	0	2	0	—		8	0
Sporting Gijón	Total		16	0	4	0	0	0	20	0
Getafe	2016–17	Segunda División	34	0	1	0	0	0	35	0
Rayo Vallecano (loan)	2017–18	Segunda División	41	0	0	0	—		41	0
Rayo Vallecano	2018–19	La Liga	17	0	1	0	—		18	0
Rayo Vallecano	2019–20	Segunda División	7	0	0	0	—		7	0
Rayo Vallecano	Rayo Vallecano total		65	0	1	0	—		66	0
Career total			249	0	14	0	2	0	265	0

== Honours ==
Rayo Vallecano

- Segunda División: 2017–18
