= Óscar Fernández (footballer, born 1995) =

Spanish footballer (born 1995)

Óscar
Personal information
- Full name: Óscar Fernández González
- Date of birth: 16 May 1995 (age 31)
- Place of birth: Renedo de Piélagos, Spain
- Height: 1.78 m (5 ft 10 in)
- Position: Winger

Team information
- Current team: Sestao River
- Number: 16

Youth career
- Atlético Perines

Senior career*
Years	Team	Apps	(Gls)
2014–2015	Racing B	42	(16)
2014–2018	Racing Santander	79	(12)
2018–2019	Alcorcón	0	(0)
2018	→ Fuenlabrada (loan)	15	(0)
2019	→ Castellón (loan)	11	(0)
2019–2020	Barakaldo	20	(1)
2020	Don Benito	6	(0)
2020–2021	Pontevedra	14	(1)
2021–2022	Racing Rioja	23	(2)
2022–2023	Marino Luanco	32	(1)
2023–2024	Logroñés	36	(1)
2024	UE Santa Coloma	9	(0)
2025	Marino Luanco	10	(1)
2025–	Sestao River	1	(0)
- * Club domestic league appearances and goals as of 28 September 2025

Óscar Fernández González, simply known as Óscar (born 16 May 1995), is a Spanish footballer who plays for Segunda Federación club Sestao River. Mainly a right winger, he can also play as a forward.

== Football career ==
Born in Renedo de Piélagos, Cantabria, Óscar graduated from local CA Perines. On 8 July 2014 he moved to Racing de Santander, being initially assigned to the reserves in the Tercera División.

Late in the month, Óscar was called up by manager Paco Fernández to make the pre-season with the main squad. On 24 August 2014 he played his first match as a professional, replacing Bernardo in the 85th minute of a 0–1 away loss against Girona FC in the Segunda División.

Óscar only featured in one more match for the first team during the season, a 1–2 home loss against CD Leganés on 21 February 2015; his side subsequently suffered relegation. He was definitely promoted to the main squad the following July, and scored a brace in a 2–0 Segunda División B home win against Cultural y Deportiva Leonesa on 20 March 2016.

On 17 July 2018, free agent Óscar signed a two-year deal with AD Alcorcón, but was immediately loaned to CF Fuenlabrada for one year. The following 9 January, he moved to fellow third division side CD Castellón, on loan until June.

On 25 July 2019, Fernández signed for third division side Barakaldo CF after terminating his contract with the Alfareros. After seven months at CD Don Benito from January to July 2020, Fernández moved to Pontevedra CF on a deal until June 2021.
