= Isma López =

Spanish footballer

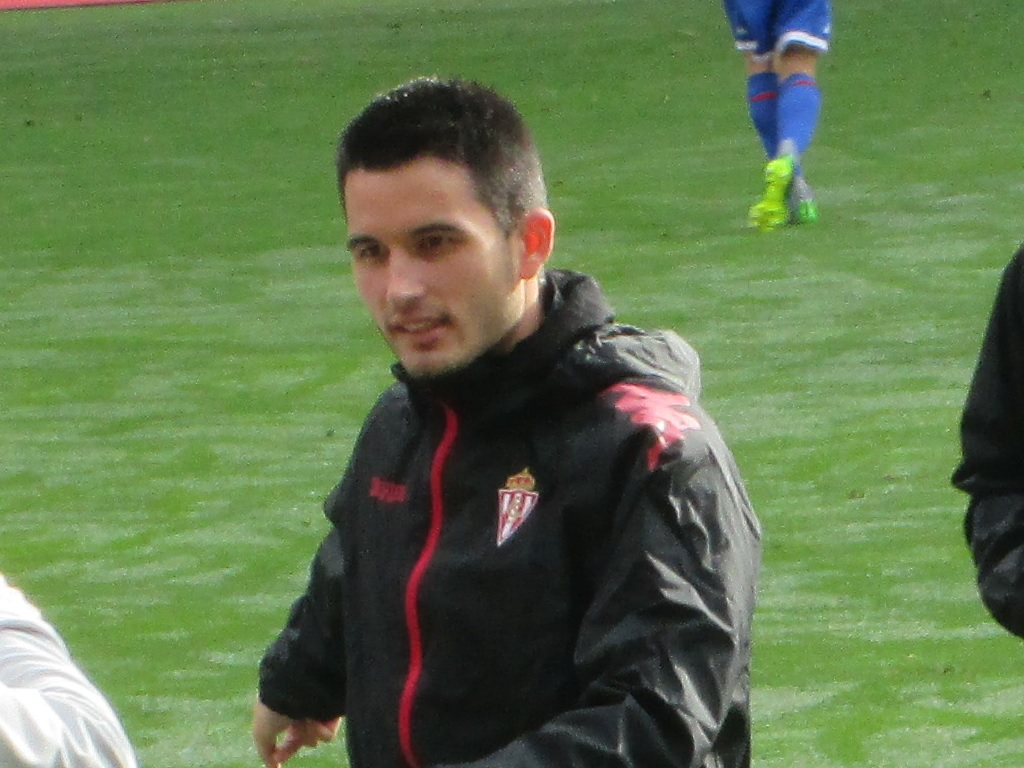
- López warming up for Sporting Gijón in 2013

Personal information
- Full name: Ismael López Blanco
- Date of birth: 29 January 1990 (age 36)
- Place of birth: Pamplona, Spain
- Height: 1.80 m (5 ft 11 in)
- Positions: Left-back; winger

Youth career
- 1995–2000: San Agustín
- 2000–2005: Osasuna
- 2005–2007: Athletic Bilbao

Senior career*
Years	Team	Apps	(Gls)
2007–2010	Bilbao Athletic	81	(15)
2010–2011	Zaragoza B	35	(13)
2011–2012	Lugo	34	(7)
2012–2013	Athletic Bilbao	8	(0)
2013–2018	Sporting Gijón	130	(8)
2018–2019	Omonia	16	(2)
2019–2020	Tenerife	23	(2)
2020	Dinamo București	8	(0)
2021–2022	Racing Santander	22	(0)
Total		357	(47)

International career
2006–2007	Spain U17	18	(4)
2008	Spain U19	8	(0)
Medal record
Men's football
Representing Spain
U-17 World Cup
Runner-up	2007 Korea
European U-17 Championship
Winner	2007 Belgium
- * Club domestic league appearances and goals as of 16:58, 8 July 2022 (UTC)

Ismael 'Isma' López Blanco (born 29 January 1990) is a Spanish professional footballer. Mainly a left-back, he can also play as a left winger.

== Club career ==
Born in Pamplona, Navarre, López signed for Athletic Bilbao in 2005 at the age of 15, going on to spend three full seasons with the reserve side in the Segunda División B. He continued to play in the lower leagues the following years, with Deportivo Aragón (Tercera División) and CD Lugo (third tier), helping the latter to promote to Segunda División after an absence of twenty years in his only season.

López returned to the Lions – who had retained a buyback option on the player – in the summer of 2012, being offered a two-year contract with a €30 million buyout clause. He scored twice on his official debut, helping to a 3–1 home win against NK Slaven Belupo in the UEFA Europa League's third qualifying round, on 8 August 2012 (4–3 aggregate victory).

In July 2013, López cut ties with Athletic and signed a three-year deal with Sporting de Gijón. During the 2014–15 campaign, he was converted into a left-back by manager Abelardo Fernández, appearing in 25 matches and scoring five goals as his team returned to La Liga after three years.

López terminated his contract with Sporting on 9 July 2018, and moved abroad for the first time in his career after agreeing to a contract with AC Omonia just hours later. The following 29 January, he returned to Spain and its second division after joining CD Tenerife on a two-and-a-half-year deal.

On 1 September 2020, López was transferred to Romanian Liga I side FC Dinamo București. He left in December, due to unpaid wages.

== Career statistics ==
As of match played on 21 March 2021

Appearances and goals by club, season and competition
Club	Season	League			Cup		Other		Total	
Club	Season	Division	Apps	Goals	Apps	Goals	Apps	Goals	Apps	Goals
Bilbao Athletic	2007–08	Segunda División B	25	7	—		—		25	7
Bilbao Athletic	2008–09	Segunda División B	25	5	—		—		25	2
Bilbao Athletic	2009–10	Segunda División B	31	3	—		—		31	3
Bilbao Athletic	Total		81	15	—		—		81	15
Zaragoza B	2010–11	Tercera División	35	13	—		—		35	13
Lugo	2011–12	Segunda División B	34	7	1	0	6 (Note: Appearances in promotion play-offs)	0	41	7
Athletic Bilbao	2012–13	La Liga	8	0	0	0	8 (Note: Appearances in UEFA Europa League)	2	16	2
Sporting Gijón	2013–14	Segunda División	20	1	1	0	1	0	22	1
Sporting Gijón	2014–15	Segunda División	25	5	1	0	—		26	5
Sporting Gijón	2015–16	La Liga	31	2	1	0	—		32	2
Sporting Gijón	2016–17	La Liga	27	0	0	0	—		27	0
Sporting Gijón	2017–18	Segunda División	27	0	2	0	1	0	30	0
Sporting Gijón	Total		130	8	5	0	2	0	137	8
Omonia	2018–19	Cypriot First Division	16	2	2	0	—		18	2
Tenerife	2018–19	Segunda División	15	2	—		—		15	2
Tenerife	2019–20	Segunda División	8	0	2	0	—		10	0
Tenerife	Total		23	2	2	0	—		25	2
Dinamo București	2020–21	Liga I	8	0	1	0	—		9	0
Racing Santander	2020–21	Segunda División B	6	0	0	0	—		6	0
Career total			341	47	11	0	16	2	368	49

== Honours ==
Spain U17

- UEFA European Under-17 Championship: 2007
- FIFA U-17 World Cup runner-up: 2007
