= Álex Menéndez =

Spanish footballer

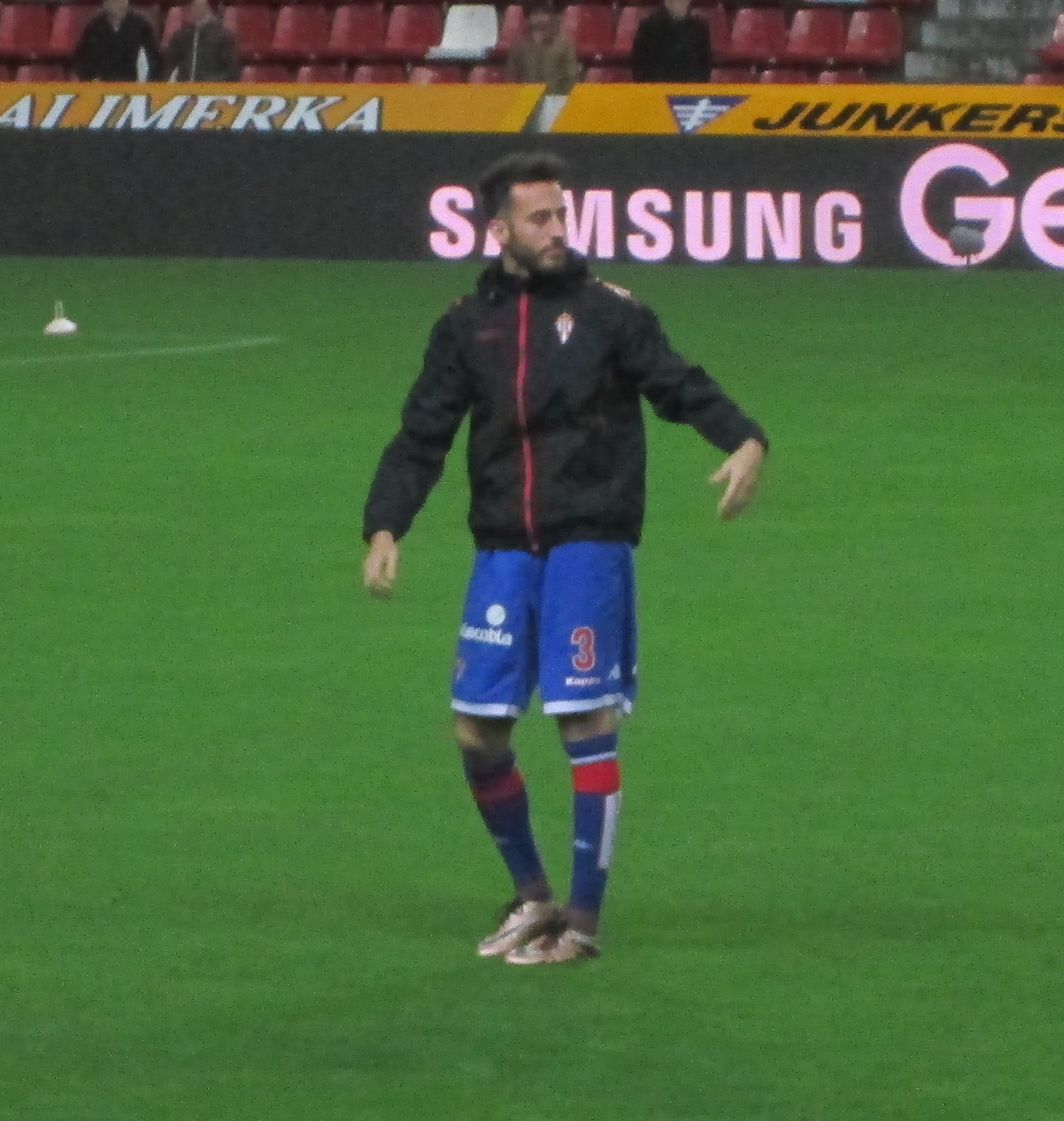

Personal information
- Full name: Alejandro Menéndez Díez
- Date of birth: 15 July 1991 (age 35)
- Place of birth: Gijón, Spain
- Height: 1.81 m (5 ft 11 in)
- Position: Left-back

Team information
- Current team: Langreo
- Number: 3

Youth career
- 1996–2003: Astur
- 2003–2010: Sporting Gijón

Senior career*
Years	Team	Apps	(Gls)
2010–2014	Sporting Gijón B	106	(1)
2011–2016	Sporting Gijón	57	(2)
2016	Girona	0	(0)
2017–2018	Reus	31	(0)
2018–2020	Aris	11	(0)
2019	→ Córdoba (loan)	15	(0)
2021	Zamora	8	(0)
2022	Salamanca	16	(1)
2023	Xerez Deportivo	11	(0)
2023–2024	Covadonga	20	(3)
2024–	Langreo	55	(4)
- * Club domestic league appearances and goals as of 14 May 2026

Alejandro 'Álex' Menéndez Díez (born 15 July 1991) is a Spanish professional footballer who plays as a left-back for Segunda Federación club Langreo.

== Club career ==
Menéndez was born in Gijón, Asturias. A product of Sporting de Gijón's prolific youth academy who was initially a left winger, he made his senior debut in the 2010–11 season, playing 21 games in the Segunda División B for the reserves, who suffered relegation but were later reinstated.

Menéndez first appeared officially with the main squad on 13 December 2011, featuring the full 90 minutes in a 1–0 away win against RCD Mallorca in the round of 32 of the Copa del Rey. On 1 May of the following year, he again played the entire match in his La Liga bow, the 2–3 home loss to Villarreal CF all but signifying the first team's relegation after a four-year stay.

On 13 August 2013, Menéndez signed a new three-year contract with the club. In summer 2014 he was definitely promoted to Sporting's first team, now in the Segunda División.

Menéndez scored his first professional goal on 20 September 2015, closing a 3–2 away victory over Deportivo de La Coruña. His second came two rounds later in another away fixture that ended in win, 2–1 at RCD Espanyol.

On 30 July 2016, Menéndez signed a two-year deal with second-tier Girona FC, as a free agent. On 8 August, however, after suffering a severe knee injury, he was released.

On 13 July 2017, Menéndez agreed to a two-year contract at CF Reus Deportiu of the same league. He first moved abroad in the 2018 off-season, joining Aris Thessaloniki F.C. from Greece on a two-year deal.

Menéndez returned to Spain on 31 January 2019, on a six-month loan at division two side Córdoba CF. Back at Aris, the Greek club attempted to force his departure by not paying his wages and making him train separately from his teammates; on 28 January 2020, the player's contract was terminated by mutual agreement.

On 19 March 2021, Menéndez signed with Spanish third-division Zamora CF until the end of the campaign. Aged 30, he moved down to the newly formed Segunda Federación and remained there until his retirement, representing in quick succession Salamanca CF UDS, Xerez Deportivo FC, CD Covadonga and UP Langreo.

== Career statistics ==
As of 5 August 2019

Club	Season	League			Cup		Continental		Other		Total	
Club	Season	Division	Apps	Goals	Apps	Goals	Apps	Goals	Apps	Goals	Apps	Goals
Sporting Gijón	2011–12	La Liga	2	0	2	0	—		—		4	0
Sporting Gijón	2012–13	Segunda División	4	0	2	0	—		—		6	0
Sporting Gijón	2013–14	Segunda División	6	0	1	0	—		—		7	0
Sporting Gijón	2014–15	Segunda División	24	0	0	0	—		—		24	0
Sporting Gijón	2015–16	La Liga	21	2	2	0	—		—		23	2
Sporting Gijón	Total		57	2	7	0	—		—		64	2
Reus	2017–18	Segunda División	31	0	1	0	—		—		32	0
Aris	2018–19	Super League Greece	11	0	3	0	—		—		14	0
Aris	2019–20	Super League Greece	0	0	0	0	—		—		0	0
Aris	Total		11	0	3	0	0	0	—		14	0
Córdoba (loan)	2018–19	Segunda División	15	0	0	0	—		—		15	0
Career total			114	2	11	0	0	0	0	0	125	11
