= Carlos Castro (footballer, born 1995) =

Spanish footballer

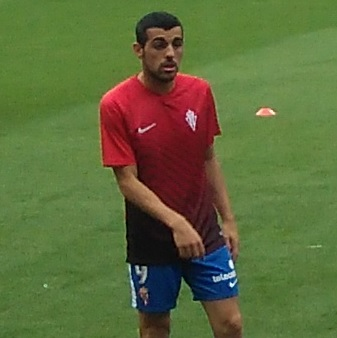
- Castro with Sporting Gijón in 2017

Personal information
- Full name: Carlos Castro García
- Date of birth: 1 June 1995 (age 31)
- Place of birth: Ujo, Spain
- Height: 1.76 m (5 ft 9 in)
- Position: Forward

Youth career
- 2005–2006: CD Ujo
- 2006–2008: Caudal
- 2008–2009: Oviedo
- 2009–2013: Sporting Gijón

Senior career*
Years	Team	Apps	(Gls)
2012–2014	Sporting B	22	(4)
2014–2018	Sporting Gijón	99	(21)
2018–2020	Mallorca	8	(1)
2019	→ Elche (loan)	13	(3)
2019–2020	→ Lugo (loan)	10	(0)
2020–2021	Dinamo Tbilisi	4	(0)
2021–2022	Racing Santander	4	(0)

International career
2014–2016	Spain U21	3	(0)
- * Club domestic league appearances and goals as of 20 July 2020

Carlos Castro García (born 1 June 1995), is a Spanish professional footballer who plays as a forward.

== Club career ==
Born in Ujo, Asturias, Castro graduated with Sporting de Gijón's youth setup. He made his senior debuts with the reserves in the 2011–12 campaign, aged only 16, in Segunda División B.

On 2 September 2014 Castro signed a four-year professional deal with the club, and was definitely promoted to the main squad in Segunda División. Eight days later he made his professional debut, starting in a 1–3 home loss against Real Valladolid for the season's Copa del Rey.

Castro made his league debut on the 28th, again from the bench in a 1–1 draw against the same club. On 12 October he scored his first professional goal, netting a last-minute winner in a 2–1 home win against CD Leganés.

On 9 November 2014, Castro scored a brace in a 3–1 home win against Real Zaragoza. He added another on 22 February of the following year, in a 4–1 routing of CD Mirandés also at the El Molinón.

Castro made his La Liga debut on 23 September 2015, replacing Miguel Ángel Guerrero in a 1–2 away loss against Rayo Vallecano. Four days later he scored his first goal in the category, but in a home defeat to Real Betis for the same scoreline.

On 10 July 2018, Castro signed a two-year deal with RCD Mallorca in the second division. The following 29 January, after being rarely used, he moved to fellow league team Elche CF on loan until the end of the season.

On 16 July 2019, Castro moved to fellow second division side CD Lugo also in a temporary deal.

On 7 October 2020, Castro moved abroad for the first time in his career, signing a contract with FC Dinamo Tbilisi until December 2022.

On 8 June 2021, Castro returned to his country, signed with third division side Racing Santander.

== Honors ==
Sporting Gijón

- Segunda División second-place promotion: 2014–15

Racing Santander

- Primera División RFEF: 2021–22
