= Carlos Carmona (Spanish footballer) =

Spanish professional footballer (born 1987)

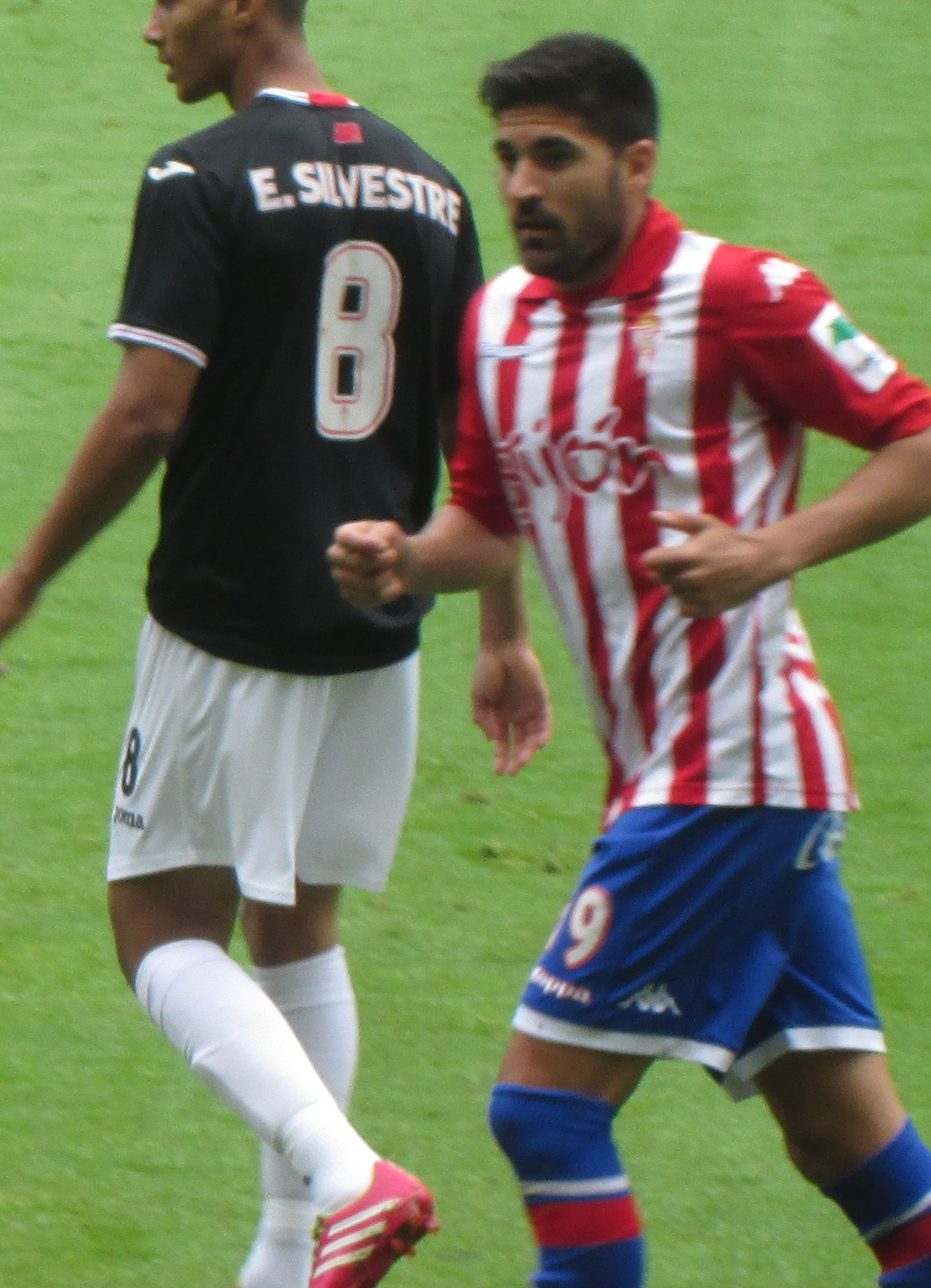
- Carmona in action for Sporting Gijón in 2014

Personal information
- Full name: Carlos Carmona Bonet
- Date of birth: 5 July 1987 (age 39)
- Place of birth: Palma, Spain
- Height: 1.77 m (5 ft 10 in)
- Position: Winger

Youth career
- 2002–2004: Mallorca

Senior career*
Years	Team	Apps	(Gls)
2004–2005	Mallorca B	17	(0)
2004–2009	Mallorca	1	(0)
2005–2006	→ Valladolid (loan)	15	(0)
2006–2009	→ Cartagena (loan)	90	(23)
2009–2010	Recreativo	38	(7)
2010–2012	Barcelona B	55	(6)
2012–2021	Sporting Gijón	279	(42)
2021–2023	Intercity	32	(3)
Total		527	(81)

International career
2002–2003	Spain U16	4	(0)
2004–2005	Spain U17	13	(5)
2004–2006	Spain U19	7	(1)
Medal record
Men's football
Representing Spain
UEFA European Under-17 Championship
Runner-up	2004 France
- * Club domestic league appearances and goals

Carlos Carmona Bonet (born 5 July 1987) is a Spanish former professional footballer who played as a right winger or attacking midfielder.

== Club career ==
Born in Palma de Mallorca, Balearic Islands, Carmona began his career with RCD Mallorca, making his first-team – and La Liga – debut on 28 November 2004, at just 17, playing 12 minutes in a 2–0 away loss against Valencia CF. For the 2005–06 season he was loaned to Real Valladolid of Segunda División, being sparingly used during his spell (less than half of the league matches, no goals).

From 2006 to 2009, Carmona was also loaned, now to FC Cartagena in the Segunda División B, being instrumental in the club's promotion in his third year. Even though he had vowed to stay if that goal was achieved he was eventually released by Mallorca, and signed a three-year deal with Recreativo de Huelva on 2 July 2009.

Carmona alternated between the top flight and the second tier the following years, representing FC Barcelona B and Sporting de Gijón. He scored eight goals in 25 games in the 2016–17 campaign while with the latter side, not being able however to prevent relegation; additionally, he renewed his contract until 2021.

On 16 July 2021, after nine years at Sporting and 293 competitive appearances, free agent Carmona joined Segunda División RFEF club CF Intercity. He achieved third-tier promotion in his first season, contributing two goals in seven starts.

== International career ==
Carmona was part of the Spain squad that finished second at the 2004 UEFA European Under-17 Championship in France.

== Personal life ==
Carmona's uncle, Francisco, was also a footballer. He notably represented Real Madrid, as well as Mallorca.

== Career statistics ==
As of 1 July 2021

Appearances and goals by club, season and competition
Club	Season	League			Cup		Europe		Other		Total	
Club	Season	Division	Apps	Goals	Apps	Goals	Apps	Goals	Apps	Goals	Apps	Goals
Mallorca B	2004–05	Segunda División B	17	0	—		—		—		17	0
Mallorca	2004–05	La Liga	1	0	2	0	—		—		3	0
Valladolid (loan)	2005–06	Segunda División	15	0	0	0	—		—		15	0
Cartagena (loan)	2006–07	Segunda División B	25	5	1	0	—		—		26	5
Cartagena (loan)	2007–08	Segunda División B	31	7	2	0	—		—		33	7
Cartagena (loan)	2008–09	Segunda División B	34	11	—		—		3 (Note: Appearances in promotion play-offs)	0	37	11
Cartagena (loan)	Total		90	23	3	0	0	0	3	0	96	23
Recreativo	2009–10	Segunda División	38	7	2	2	—		—		40	9
Barcelona B	2010–11	Segunda División	27	3	—		—		—		27	3
Barcelona B	2011–12	Segunda División	28	3	—		—		—		28	3
Barcelona B	Total		55	6	0	0	0	0	0	0	55	6
Sporting Gijón	2012–13	Segunda División	32	5	2	0	—		—		34	5
Sporting Gijón	2013–14	Segunda División	35	7	1	0	—		2	0	38	7
Sporting Gijón	2014–15	Segunda División	38	2	0	0	—		—		38	2
Sporting Gijón	2015–16	La Liga	20	2	1	0	—		—		21	2
Sporting Gijón	2016–17	La Liga	25	8	2	0	—		—		27	8
Sporting Gijón	2017–18	Segunda División	41	9	0	0	—		2	1	43	10
Sporting Gijón	2018–19	Segunda División	35	7	0	0	—		—		35	7
Sporting Gijón	2019–20	Segunda División	33	2	1	0	—		—		34	2
Sporting Gijón	2020–21	Segunda División	20	0	3	0	—		—		34	2
Sporting Gijón	Total		279	42	10	0	0	0	4	1	293	43
Career total			495	78	17	2	0	0	7	1	519	81
