= 2010–11 Sporting de Gijón season =

Real Sporting
2010–11 season
- Chairman: Manuel Vega-Arango
- Manager: Manuel Preciado
- Stadium: El Molinón
- La Liga: 10th
- Copa del Rey: Round of 32
- Top goalscorer: Diego Castro (9)
- Highest home attendance: 28,000; Sporting 1–1 Barcelona (12 February 2011)
- Lowest home attendance: 18,600; Sporting 1–1 Villarreal (31 October 2010)
- Average home league attendance: 22,426
Home colours	Away colours	Third colours

The 2010–11 Sporting de Gijón season was the third successive season that the club played in La Liga, the highest tier of football in Spain.

== Overview ==
On 2 April 2011, thanks to a goal scored by Miguel de las Cuevas, Sporting beat Real Madrid 1–0 at Santiago Bernabéu Stadium to end Real manager José Mourinho's nine-year home league unbeaten run.

The club finally avoided relegation after beating 2–1 Racing de Santander at El Molinón in the 37th matchday.

== Squad ==
Note: Flags indicate national team as defined under FIFA eligibility rules; some limited exceptions apply. Players may hold more than one non-FIFA nationality.

No.	Pos.	Nation	Player
1	GK	ESP	Juan Pablo
2	DF	ESP	Alberto Botía
3	DF	ESP	José Ángel
4	DF	ESP	Jorge
5	MF	ESP	Alberto Rivera
6	MF	ESP	Carmelo
7	MF	ESP	Ayoze
8	FW	ARG	Gastón Sangoy
9	FW	CRO	Mate Bilić
10	FW	ESP	Nacho Novo
11	MF	ESP	Alberto Lora
12	DF	FRA	Grégory Arnolin
13	GK	ESP	Iván Cuéllar

No.	Pos.	Nation	Player
14	DF	ESP	Iván Hernández
15	DF	ESP	Roberto Canella (vice-captain)
16	MF	POR	André Castro (on loan from Porto)
17	FW	ESP	Diego Castro
18	FW	ESP	Luis Morán
19	MF	URU	Sebastián Eguren
20	MF	ESP	Miguel de las Cuevas
21	MF	ESP	Marcos Landeira
22	DF	ESP	Rafel Sastre (captain)
23	FW	ESP	David Barral
24	MF	ESP	Sergio Matabuena
25	DF	ESP	Javi Poves

=== From the youth squad ===
Note: Flags indicate national team as defined under FIFA eligibility rules; some limited exceptions apply. Players may hold more than one non-FIFA nationality.

No.	Pos.	Nation	Player
26	MF	ESP	Sergio Álvarez
27	GK	ESP	Raúl
28	MF	ESP	Juan Muñiz
29	DF	ESP	Pedro Orfila

No.	Pos.	Nation	Player
30	MF	ESP	Guillermo
31	DF	ESP	Alain
32	MF	ESP	Nacho Cases

== Competitions ==
=== La Liga ===
==== Results by round ====
Round	1	2	3	4	5	6	7	8	9	10	11	12	13	14	15	16	17	18	19	20	21	22	23	24	25	26	27	28	29	30	31	32	33	34	35	36	37	38
Ground	A	H	H	A	H	A	H	A	H	A	H	A	H	A	H	A	H	A	H	H	A	A	H	A	H	A	H	A	H	A	H	A	H	A	H	A	H	A
Result	L	W	D	L	L	D	W	L	D	D	L	L	L	L	D	D	L	D	W	W	W	L	D	D	D	L	W	D	W	W	W	L	W	D	D	L	W	D
Position	20	13	12	15	17	16	12	15	15	13	17	17	17	18	19	19	20	18	17	15	12	13	16	16	17	18	16	17	15	13	11	11	11	10	9	15	9	10

Source: BDFútbol
A = Away; H = Home; W = Win; D = Draw; L = Loss

==== League table ====
Pos	Team	Pld	W	D	L	GF	GA	GD	Pts
8	Espanyol	38	15	4	19	46	55	−9	49
9	Osasuna	38	13	8	17	45	46	−1	47 (Note: OSA 1–1 SPG; SPG 1–1 OSA)
10	Sporting Gijón	38	11	14	13	35	42	−7	47
11	Málaga	38	13	7	18	54	68	−14	46 (Note: MLG 4–1 RAC; RAC 1–2 MLG)
12	Racing Santander	38	12	10	16	41	56	−15	46

Source: LFP, sportec.es, Yahoo! Sport
Rules for classification: 1st points; 2nd head-to-head points; 3rd head-to-head goal difference; 4th head-to-head goals scored; 5th goal difference; 6th number of goals scored; 7th Fair-play points

==== Matches ====
30 August 2010 1	Atlético Madrid	4–0	Real Sporting	Vicente Calderón
	Jurado 11'; Forlán 40', 62'; Simaõ 90'	Summary		Referee: Ramírez Domínguez

12 August 2010 2	Real Sporting	2–0	Mallorca	El Molinón
	Botía 47'; D. Castro 86'	Summary	Nunes (red card) 83'	Referee: Javier Estrada Fernández

18 September 2010 3	Real Sporting	2–2	Athletic Bilbao	El Molinón
	De las Cuevas 12'; Sangoy 23'	Summary	Gurpegui 28'; Llorente 58'	Referee: Álvarez Izquierdo

22 September 2010 4	Barcelona	1–0	Real Sporting	Camp Nou
	Villa 49'	Report		Referee: Paradas Romero

25 September 2010 3	Real Sporting	0–2	Valencia	El Molinón
		Summary	Topal 7'; Soldado 10'	Referee: David Fernández Borbalán

2 October 2010 6	Real Zaragoza	2–2	Real Sporting	La Romareda
	Jarošík (red card) 47'; Sinama Pongolle 56', 61'	Summary	Obradović 23' (o.g.); D. Castro 48'	Referee: Ayza Gámez

17 October 2010 7	Real Sporting	2–0	Sevilla	El Molinón
	Sangoy 6'; D. Castro 51'	Summary		Referee: José González González

24 October 2010 8	Getafe	3–0	Real Sporting	Coliseum Alfonso Pérez
	Boateng 8'; Colunga 50'; Marcano 59'	Summary		Referee: Antonio Mateu Lahoz

31 October 2010 9	Real Sporting	1–1	Villarreal	El Molinón
	D. Castro 68'	Report	Rossi 90'	Referee: Iglesias Villanueva

7 November 2010 10	Almería	1–1	Real Sporting	Mediterráneo
	Corona 15'	Summary	Novo 73'	Referee: Javier Estrada Fernández

14 November 2010 11	Real Sporting	0–1	Real Madrid	El Molinón
	Botía (red card) 89'	Summary	Higuaín 82'	Referee: Turienzo Álvarez

21 November 2010 12	Osasuna	1–0	Real Sporting	Reyno de Navarra
	Masoud 53'	Summary		Referee: J.A. Teixeira Vitienes

28 November 2010 13	Real Sporting	1–3	Real Sociedad	El Molinón
	Grégory 3'	Summary	Prieto 11'; Zurutuza 45'; Aranburu 90'	Referee: Paradas Romero

5 December 2010 14	Espanyol	1–0	Real Sporting	Cornellà-El Prat
	Baena (yellow card) 0' (yellow-red card) 51'; Luis García 69'	Report		Referee: Iglesias Villanueva

12 December 2010 15	Real Sporting	1–1	Levante	El Molinón
	Eguren 80'	Summary	Caicedo 72'	Referee: Delgado Ferreiro

18 December 2010 16	Deportivo La Coruña	1–1	Real Sporting	Riazor
	Aythami 14'	Summary	D. Castro 89'	Referee: Carlos Velasco Carballo

2 January 2011 17	Real Sporting	1–2	Málaga	El Molinón
	Castro 42'	Summary	Weligton 45'; Apoño 59'	Referee: José Teixeira Vitienes

9 January 2011 18	Racing Santander	1–1	Real Sporting	El Sardinero
	Grégory 29' (o.g.)	Report	D. Castro 90'	Referee: Ayza Gámez

15 January 2011 19	Real Sporting	2–0	Hércules	El Molinón
	Barral 1'; Cases 29'	Report		Referee: Carlos Clos Gómez

23 January 2011 20	Real Sporting	1–0	Atlético Madrid	Gijón
	Barral 51'	Report		Stadium: El Molinón; Referee: Estrada Fernández

29 January 2011 21	Mallorca	0–4	Real Sporting	Ono Estadi
		Summary	D. Castro 6'; Kevin 60' (o.g.); A. Castro 66'; Novo 86'	Referee: Paradas Romero

5 February 2011 22	Athletic Bilbao	3–0	Real Sporting	San Mamés
	López 15' (pen.); Toquero 26'; Llorente 73'	Summary	Grégory (red card) 14'	Referee: J.A. Teixeira Vitienes

12 February 2011 23	Real Sporting	1–1	Barcelona	El Molinón
	Barral 16'	Summary	Villa 79'	Attendance: 28,000; Referee: Pérez Lasa

19 February 2011 24	Valencia	0–0	Real Sporting	Mestalla
		Summary		Referee: Carlos Clos Gómez

26 February 2011 25	Real Sporting	0–0	Real Zaragoza	El Molinón
		Report		Referee: Eduardo Iturralde González

1 March 2011 26	Sevilla	3–0	Real Sporting	Ramón Sánchez Pizjuán
	Luís Fabiano 28' (pen.); Perotti 34'; Negredo 65'	Summary	Eguren (red card) 26'	Referee: Rubinos Pérez

6 March 2011 27	Real Sporting	2–0	Getafe	El Molinón
	De las Cuevas 31'; A. Castro 41'; Lora (yellow card) 0' (yellow-red card) 85'	Summary		Referee: José Teixeira Vitienes

13 March 2011 28	Villarreal	1–1	Real Sporting	El Madrigal
	Rossi 29'	Summary	José Ángel (red card) 66'; Sastre (red card) 89'; D. Castro 90' (pen.)	Referee: Fernández Borbalán

20 March 2011 29	Real Sporting	1–0	Almería	El Molinón
	De las Cuevas 12'	Summary		Referee: Turienzo Álvarez

2 April 2011 30	Real Madrid	0–1	Real Sporting	Santiago Bernabéu
		Summary	De las Cuevas 78'	Referee: González González

10 April 2011 31	Real Sporting	1–0	Osasuna	El Molinón
	Barral 66'	Summary		Referee: Fernando Teixeira Vitienes

17 April 2011 32	Real Sociedad	2–1	Real Sporting	Anoeta
	Griezmann 31', 79'	Report	De las Cuevas 68'	Referee: Iglesias Villanueva

24 April 2011 33	Real Sporting	1–0	Espanyol	El Molinón
	Novo 70'	Summary		Referee: Rubinos Pérez

1 May 2011 34	Levante	0–0	Real Sporting	Ciutat de València
		Summary		Referee: Álvarez Izquierdo

7 May 2011 35	Real Sporting	2–2	Deportivo La Coruña	El Molinón
	Ayoze 34'; Barral 89' (pen.)	Summary	Adrián 8', 39'	Referee: Javier Estrada Fernández

10 May 2011 36	Málaga	2–0	Real Sporting	La Rosaleda
	Baptista 9'; Eliseu 67'	Summary		Referee: Eduardo Iturralde González

15 May 2011 37	Real Sporting	2–1	Racing Santander	El Molinón
	De las Cuevas 44'; Novo 51'	Summary	Fernández 31'	Referee: Ayza Gámez

21 May 2011 38	Hércules	0–0	Real Sporting	Rico Pérez
		Summary		Referee: Ramírez Domínguez

=== Copa del Rey ===
==== Matches ====
27 October 2010 Round of 32; First Leg	Mallorca	3–1	Real Sporting	Palma
21:00 CET	Cavenaghi 11', 33'; Rubén 89'	Report	Barral 59'	Stadium: Iberostar; Referee: Delgado Ferreiro

11 November 2010 Round of 32; Second Leg	Real Sporting	2–2 (3–5 agg.)	Mallorca	Gijón
20:00 CET	Bilić 25'; Muñiz 63'	Report	Nsue 10', 15'	Stadium: El Molinón; Referee: Pérez Lasa

== Squad statistics ==
=== Appearances and goals ===
No.	Pos	Nat	Player	Total		La Liga		Copa del Rey	
No.	Pos	Nat	Player	Apps	Goals	Apps	Goals	Apps	Goals
1	GK	(Spain) ESP	Juan Pablo	25	0	24+1	0	0+0	0
2	DF	(Spain) ESP	Alberto Botía	29	1	27+1	1	1+0	0
3	DF	(Spain) ESP	José Ángel	27	0	23+3	0	0+1	0
4	DF	(Spain) ESP	Jorge	7	0	2+3	0	2+0	0
5	MF	(Spain) ESP	Alberto Rivera	31	0	30+0	0	0+1	0
6	MF	(Spain) ESP	Carmelo	19	0	9+9	0	1+0	0
7	MF	(Spain) ESP	Ayoze	14	1	6+7	1	1+0	0
8	FW	(Argentina) ARG	Gastón Sangoy	20	2	14+5	2	1+0	0
9	FW	(Croatia) CRO	Mate Bilić	20	1	3+15	0	2+0	1
10	FW	(Spain) ESP	Nacho Novo	30	4	15+15	4	0+0	0
11	MF	(Spain) ESP	Alberto Lora	37	0	35+1	0	1+0	0
12	DF	(France) FRA	Grégory Arnolin	24	1	23+0	1	1+0	0
13	GK	(Spain) ESP	Iván Cuéllar	15	0	13+0	0	2+0	0
14	DF	(Spain) ESP	Iván Hernández	25	0	24+1	0	0+0	0
15	DF	(Spain) ESP	Roberto Canella	17	0	15+2	0	0+0	0
16	MF	(Portugal) POR	André Castro	16	2	11+5	2	0+0	0
17	FW	(Spain) ESP	Diego Castro	29	9	26+2	9	1+0	0
18	FW	(Spain) ESP	Luis Morán	17	0	6+9	0	1+1	0
19	MF	(Uruguay) URU	Sebastián Eguren	32	1	27+3	1	2+0	0
20	MF	(Spain) ESP	Miguel de las Cuevas	38	6	30+7	6	1+0	0
21	DF	(Spain) ESP	Marcos Landeira	2	0	0+1	0	1+0	0
22	DF	(Spain) ESP	Sastre	10	0	7+1	0	2+0	0
23	FW	(Spain) ESP	David Barral	35	6	24+10	5	0+1	1
24	MF	(Spain) ESP	Sergio Matabuena	4	0	3+1	0	0+0	0
25	DF	(Spain) ESP	Javi Poves	1	0	0+1	0	0+0	0
26	MF	(Spain) ESP	Sergio Álvarez	9	0	3+5	0	1+0	0
27	GK	(Spain) ESP	Raúl	1	0	1+0	0	0+0	0
28	MF	(Spain) ESP	Juan Muñiz	2	1	0+1	0	0+1	1
29	DF	(Spain) ESP	Pedro Orfila	1	0	0+0	0	1+0	0
30	FW	(Spain) ESP	Guillermo	1	0	0+1	0	0+0	0
31	MF	(Spain) ESP	Nacho Cases	18	1	17+1	1	0+0	0
32	DF	(Spain) ESP	Alain	0	0	0+0	0	0+0	0
Players who appeared for Sporting de Gijón no longer at the club:
16	MF	(Spain) ESP	Cristian Portilla	2	0	0+1	0	1+0	0
