= 2011–12 Sporting de Gijón season =

Real Sporting
2011–12 season
- Chairman: Manuel Vega-Arango
- Manager: Manuel Preciado
- Stadium: El Molinón
- La Liga: 19th
- Copa del Rey: Round of 32
- Top goalscorer: League: David Barral (10); All: David Barral (10)
Home colours	Away colours	Third colours

The 2011–12 Sporting de Gijón season was the 4th successive season that the club played in La Liga, the highest tier of football in Spain.

== Squad ==
Note: Flags indicate national team as defined under FIFA eligibility rules; some limited exceptions apply. Players may hold more than one non-FIFA nationality.

No.	Pos.	Nation	Player
1	GK	ESP	Juan Pablo
2	DF	ESP	Alberto Botía
3	MF	POR	André Castro (on loan from Porto)
5	MF	ESP	Alberto Rivera
6	MF	ESP	Carmelo
7	MF	ESP	Ayoze
8	MF	URU	Sebastián Eguren
9	FW	CRO	Mate Bilić
11	MF	ESP	Alberto Lora
12	DF	FRA	Grégory Arnolin
13	GK	ESP	Raúl Domínguez
14	DF	ESP	Iván Hernández
15	DF	ESP	Roberto Canella (vice-captain)

No.	Pos.	Nation	Player
16	MF	ESP	Sergio Álvarez
17	DF	URU	Damián Suárez
18	FW	ESP	Adrián Colunga (On loan from at Getafe)
19	FW	ARG	Gastón Sangoy
20	MF	ESP	Miguel de las Cuevas
21	MF	ESP	Nacho Cases
22	MF	ESP	Ricardo
23	FW	ESP	David Barral (captain)
24	FW	ARG	Óscar Trejo
25	GK	ESP	Iván Cuéllar
26	DF	ESP	Pedro Orfila
28	MF	ESP	Juan Muñiz
31	DF	ESP	Álex Menéndez
33	DF	ESP	Álex Gálvez

=== On loan ===
Note: Flags indicate national team as defined under FIFA eligibility rules; some limited exceptions apply. Players may hold more than one non-FIFA nationality.

No. / Pos. / Nation / Player; 18 / FW / ESP / Luis Morán (at AEK Larnaca)	No. / Pos. / Nation / Player

== Transfers ==
In

N	P	Nat.	Name	Age	From	Type	Transfer Window	Ends
16	MF	(Spain)	Sergio Álvarez	19	Reserve team	Promoted	Summer	
17	DF	(Uruguay)	Damián Suárez	23	Defensor Sporting (Uruguay)	Transfer	Summer	2014
21	MF	(Spain)	Nacho Cases	23	Reserve team	Promoted	Mid-season	2014
22	MF	(Spain)	Ricardo	28	Tenerife (Spain)	Free agent	Summer	2014
24	FW	(Argentina)	Óscar Trejo	23	Mallorca (Spain)	Transfer	Summer	2015
25	GK	(Spain)	Raúl Domínguez	24	Reserve team	Promoted	Summer	
3	MF	(Portugal)	André Castro	22	Porto (Portugal)	Loan	Summer	2012
18	FW	(Spain)	Adrián Colunga	27	Getafe (Spain)	Loan	Winter	2012

Out

P	Nat.	Name	Age	To	Type	Transfer Window
DF	(Spain)	Rafel Sastre	35	Huesca (Spain)	End of contract	Summer
DF	(Spain)	José Ángel	21	Roma (Italy)	Transfer	Summer
DF	(Spain)	Javi Poves	24		Mutual agreement	Summer
MF	(Spain)	Cristian Portilla	22	Aris (Greece)	Mutual agreement	Winter 2010–11
MF	(Spain)	Sergio Matabuena	31	Real Valladolid (Spain)	Mutual agreement	Winter 2010–11
MF	(Spain)	Diego Castro	28	Getafe (Spain)	End of contract	Summer
FW	(Spain)	Nacho Novo	10	Legia Warsaw (Poland)	Mutual agreement	Winter 2010–11

== Competitions ==
=== La Liga ===
==== Results by round ====
Round	2	3	4	5	6	7	8	9	10	11	12	13	14	15	16	17	18	19	1	21	22	23	24	25	26	27	28	29	29	31	32	33	34	35	36	20	37	38
Ground	H	A	H	A	H	H	A	H	A	H	A	H	A	H	A	H	A	H	A	A	H	A	H	A	A	H	A	H	A	H	A	H	A	H	A	H	H	A
Result	L	L	L	L	D	L	L	W	W	D	D	W	L	L	W	L	L	W	L	L	D	L	D	D	L	W	L	L	D	L	L	W	L	W	W	L	W	L
Position	16	19	20	20	20	20	20	19	17	17	17	14	18	19	18	18	19	18	19	19	19	19	19	19	19	19	19	19	19	20	19	18	19	18	19	19	19	19

Source: BDFútbol
A = Away; H = Home; W = Win; D = Draw; L = Loss

==== Matches ====
27 August 2011 1	Real Sporting	1–2	Real Sociedad	El Molinón
	De las Cuevas 68' (pen.); Lora (yellow card) 44' (yellow-red card) 90'	Summary	Agirretxe 35', 65'; C. Martínez (red card) 68'	Attendance: 19,000; Referee: José Luis Paradas Romero

11 September 2011 2	Osasuna	2–1	Real Sporting	Reyno de Navarra
	Nino 28'; Cejudo 30'	Summary	Barral 75'	Attendance: 18,000; Referee: David Fernandez Borbalan

17 September 2011 3	Real Sporting	0–1	Valencia	El Molinón
		Summary	Soldado 30'	Attendance: 15,000; Referee: Carlos Delgado Ferreiro

21 September 2011 4	Atlético Madrid	4–0	Real Sporting	Estadio Vicente Calderón
	Lora 27' (o.g.); Domínguez 68'; Falcao 72', 81'	Summary		Attendance: 38,000; Referee: Eduardo Iturralde González

25 September 2011 5	Real Sporting	0–0	Racing Santander	El Molinón
		Summary		Attendance: 19,000; Referee: Pedro Jesús Pérez Montero

2 October 2011 6	Real Sporting	0–1	Barcelona	El Molinón
		Summary	Adriano	Attendance: 28,500; Referee: Carlos Clos Gómez

16 October 2011 7	Sevilla	2–1	Real Sporting	Ramón Sánchez Pizjuán
	Manu 15'; Cáceres 57'	Summary	Barral 64'	Attendance: 36,000; Referee: Miguel Pérez Lasa

22 October 2011 8	Real Sporting	2–0	Granada	El Molinón
	Barral 6'; Castro 42'	Summary		Attendance: 23,000; Referee: Ignacio Iglesias Villanueva

26 October 2011 9	Mallorca	1–2	Real Sporting	Iberostar
	Castro 16'	Summary	Bilić 46'; João Victor 65' (o.g.)	Attendance: 8,000; Referee: Carlos Del Cerro Grande

30 October 2011 10	Real Sporting	1–1	Athletic Bilbao	El Molinón
	Bilić 71'	Summary	Susaeta 63'	Attendance: 21,000; Referee: José Luis González González

6 November 2011 11	Real Zaragoza	2–2	Real Sporting	La Romareda
	Botía 28' (o.g.); Postiga 90+2'	Summary	Barral 31', 44'	Attendance: 18,161; Referee: Miguel Ángel Ayza Gámez

20 November 2011 12	Real Sporting	2–1	Getafe	El Molinón
	Trejo 45+5'; Novo 89'	Summary	Miku 35'; Barrada (yellow card) 59' (yellow-red card) 61'	Attendance: 20,000; Referee: Javier Turienzo Álvarez

27 November 2011 13	Levante	4–0	Real Sporting	Ciutat de València
	Barkero 20'; Valdo 47'; Koné 52', 62'	Summary		Attendance: 11,287; Referee: José Luis Paradas Romero

3 December 2011 14	Real Sporting	0–3	Real Madrid	El Molinón
	Eguren (yellow card) 22' (yellow-red card) 80'	Summary	Di María 34'; Ronaldo 65'; Marcelo 90+2'	Attendance: 27,000; Referee: Eduardo Iturralde González

11 December 2011 15	Rayo Vallecano	1–3	Real Sporting	Vallecas
	Michu	Summary	Barral 10'; Novo 37', 66'	Attendance: 10,100; Referee: Antonio Miguel Mateu Lahoz

17 December 2011 16	Real Sporting	1–2	Espanyol	El Molinón
	Barral 60'	Summary	Bifouma 2'; García 84'	Attendance: 22,000; Referee: Miguel Ángel Ayza Gámez

8 January 2012 17	Real Betis	2–0	Real Sporting	Benito Villamarín
	Santa Cruz 23'; Molina 90+2'	Summary	Lora (yellow card) 39' (yellow-red card) 43'; Carmelo (yellow card) 70' (yellow-red card) 90+4'	Attendance: 35,000; Referee: Javier Estrada Fernández

15 January 2012 18	Real Sporting	2–1	Málaga	El Molinón
	Gálvez 36'; Trejo 90+2'	Summary	Van Nistelrooy 88'	Attendance: 22,000; Referee: Carlos del Cerro Grande

23 January 2012 19	Villarreal	3–0	Real Sporting	El Madrigal
	Ruben 57'; Valero 59'; Bruno 90+1'	Report		Referee: Alfonso Alvarez Izquierdo

29 January 2012 20	Real Sociedad	5–1	Real Sporting	Anoeta
	Zurutuza 2', 3'; Elustondo 75'; Aranburu 90+2'; Griezmann 90+3'	Report	De las Cuevas 46'

5 February 2012 21	Real Sporting	1–1	Osasuna	El Molinón
	Carmelo 32'	Summary	Lekić 77'	Referee: Miguel Pérez Lasa

12 February 2012 22	Valencia	4–0	Real Sporting	Mestalla
	Feghouli 34'; Botía 73' (o.g.); Jonas 90+1', 90+3'	Report

19 February 2012 23	Real Sporting	1–1	Atlético Madrid
	Eguren 37'	[ Report]	Canella 20' (o.g.)	Attendance: 23,000; Referee: Miguel Pérez Lasa

25 February 2012 24	Racing Santander	1–1	Real Sporting	El Sardinero
	Stuani 74' (pen.)	Report	Barral 42'

3 March 2012 25	Barcelona	3–1	Real Sporting	Camp Nou
	Iniesta 42'; Piqué (red card) 46'; Keita 79'; Xavi 88'	Report	Barral 49'	Attendance: 72,442

10 March 2012 26	Real Sporting	1–0	Sevilla	El Molinón
20:00	Castro 32'	Summary		Attendance: 20,000

17 March 2012 27	Granada	2–1	Real Sporting	Los Cármenes
	Martins 3'; Guilherme 24'; Martins (red card) 90+4'	Summary	Colunga 90+3'	Attendance: 12,000

21 March 2012 28	Real Sporting	2–3	Mallorca	El Molinón
	Colunga 38'; Botía 66'	Report	Nunes 30'; Orfila 46' (o.g.); Álvaro 77'	Attendance: 18,000

25 March 2012 29	Athletic Bilbao	1–1	Real Sporting	San Mamés
	De Marcos 77'	Summary	Lora 90'	Attendance: 35,000

31 March 2012 30	Real Sporting	1–2	Real Zaragoza	El Molinón
	Eguren 49'	Report	Postiga 37'; Lafita 90+1'	Attendance: 29,538

7 April 2012 31	Getafe	2–0	Real Sporting	Coliseum Alfonso Pérez
	Miku 22'; Castro 47'	Summary		Attendance: 8,000

11 April 2012 32	Real Sporting	3–2	Levante	El Molinón
	Trejo 22'; Lora 74'; Sangoy 84'	Summary	Valdo 16'; Koné 63'	Attendance: 16,000

14 April 2012 33	Real Madrid	3–1	Real Sporting	Santiago Bernabéu
20:00	Higuaín 37'; Ronaldo 74'; Benzema 82'	Summary	De las Cuevas 30' (pen.); Canella (yellow card) 33' (yellow-red card) 79'	Attendance: 72,000

21 April 2012 34	Real Sporting	2–1	Rayo Vallecano	El Molinón
	Sangoy 18'; Bilić 78'	Summary	Labaka (red card); Casado (yellow card) 21' (yellow-red card) 87'	Attendance: 21,000

28 April 2012 35	Espanyol	0–3	Real Sporting	Cornellà-El Prat
		Report	Colunga 48'; Trejo 71'; Bilić 81'	Attendance: 18,000

1 May 2012 36	Real Sporting	2–3	Villarreal	El Molinón
	Lora 40'; Gálvez 85'	Report	Mario 19'; Senna 43' (pen.); Pérez 56'; César (red card) 90+3'^{1}	Attendance: 21,000

5 May 2012 37	Real Sporting	2–1	Real Betis	El Molinón
	Sangoy 13' (pen.), 55'	Report	Molina 45+1'	Attendance: 15,156

13 May 2012 38	Málaga	1–0	Real Sporting	La Rosaleda
20:00	Rondón 49'; Isco (yellow card) 70' (yellow-red card) 89'	Summary		Attendance: 22,000

Notes

- César Sánchez was sent off while being an unused sub.

==== League table ====
Pos	Team	Pld	W	D	L	GF	GA	GD	Pts	Qualification or relegation
16	Zaragoza	38	12	7	19	36	61	−25	43 (Note: RVA 0–0 ZAR; ZAR 1–2 RVA)	
17	Granada	38	12	6	20	35	56	−21	42	
18	Villarreal (R)	38	9	14	15	39	53	−14	41	Relegation to the Segunda División
19	Sporting Gijón (R)	38	10	7	21	42	69	−27	37	Relegation to the Segunda División
20	Racing Santander (R)	38	4	15	19	28	63	−35	27	Relegation to the Segunda División

Source: ESPN
Rules for classification: 1st points; 2nd head-to-head points; 3rd head-to-head goal difference; 4th head-to-head goals scored; 5th goal difference; 6th number of goals scored; 7th Fair-play points
(R) Relegated

=== Copa del Rey ===
==== Matches ====
13 December 2011 Round of 32; First Leg	Mallorca	0–1	Real Sporting	Palma
21:00 CET		(Report)	Muñiz 84'	Stadium: Iberostar; Attendance: 6,400; Referee: Alfonso Álvarez Izquierdo

20 December 2011 Round of 16; Second Leg	Real Sporting	0–2 (1–2 agg.)	Mallorca	Gijón
20:00 CET		(Report)	Menéndez 19' (o.g.); Nsue 70'	Stadium: El Molinón; Attendance: 6,000; Referee: David Fernández Borbalán

== Squad statistics ==
=== Appearances and goals ===
As of 14 May 2012

No.	Pos	Nat	Player	Total		La Liga		Copa del Rey	
No.	Pos	Nat	Player	Apps	Goals	Apps	Goals	Apps	Goals
1	GK	(Spain) ESP	Juan Pablo	37	0	37+0	0	0+0	0
2	DF	(Spain) ESP	Alberto Botía	33	1	31+1	1	1+0	0
3	MF	(Portugal) POR	André Castro	29	2	26+3	2	0+0	0
5	MF	(Spain) ESP	Alberto Rivera	29	0	21+8	0	0+0	0
6	MF	(Spain) ESP	Carmelo	14	1	7+6	1	1+0	0
7	MF	(Spain) ESP	Ayoze	16	0	7+8	0	1+0	0
8	MF	(Uruguay) URU	Sebastián Eguren	20	2	13+6	2	1+0	0
9	FW	(Croatia) CRO	Mate Bilić	21	4	1+19	4	1+0	0
11	MF	(Spain) ESP	Alberto Lora	27	3	25+2	3	0+0	0
12	DF	(France) FRA	Grégory Arnolin	23	0	20+3	0	0+0	0
14	DF	(Spain) ESP	Iván Hernández	21	0	19+1	0	0+1	0
15	DF	(Spain) ESP	Roberto Canella	31	0	30+1	0	0+0	0
16	MF	(Spain) ESP	Sergio Álvarez	6	0	4+1	0	1+0	0
17	DF	(Uruguay) URU	Damián Suárez	20	0	16+3	0	1+0	0
18	FW	(Spain) ESP	Adrián Colunga	17	3	13+4	3	0+0	0
19	FW	(Argentina) ARG	Gastón Sangoy	16	4	7+9	4	0+0	0
20	MF	(Spain) ESP	Miguel de las Cuevas	36	3	34+1	3	0+1	0
21	MF	(Spain) ESP	Nacho Cases	22	0	15+6	0	0+1	0
22	MF	(Spain) ESP	Ricardo	3	0	1+2	0	0+0	0
23	FW	(Spain) ESP	David Barral	32	10	26+4	10	0+2	0
24	FW	(Argentina) ARG	Óscar Trejo	33	4	26+7	4	0+0	0
25	GK	(Spain) ESP	Iván Cuéllar	2	0	1+0	0	1+0	0
26	DF	(Spain) ESP	Pedro Orfila	11	0	9+2	0	0+0	0
28	MF	(Spain) ESP	Juan Muñiz	2	1	0+1	0	0+1	1
31	DF	(Spain) ESP	Álex Menéndez	4	1	3+0	1	1+0	0
32	MF	(Guinea-Bissau) GBS	Formose Mendy	10	0	6+4	0	0+0	0
33	DF	(Spain) ESP	Álex Gálvez	12	2	10+1	2	1+0	0
35	DF	(Spain) ESP	Moisés García	3	0	3+0	0	0+0	0
Players who appeared for Sporting de Gijón no longer at the club:
10	FW	(Spain) ESP	Nacho Novo	11	2	8+3	2	0+0	0
18	FW	(Spain) ESP	Luis Morán	7	0	0+6	0	1+0	0

=== Top scorers ===
Place	Position	Nation	Number	Name	La Liga	Copa Del Rey	Total
1	FW	(Spain)	23	David Barral	10	0	10
2	MF	(Croatia)	9	Mate Bilić	4	0	4
2	FW	(Argentina)	24	Óscar Trejo	4	0	4
2	FW	(Argentina)	19	Gastón Sangoy	4	0	4
5	MF	(Spain)	20	Miguel de las Cuevas	3	0	3
5	FW	(Spain)	18	Adrián Colunga	3	0	3
5	MF	(Spain)	11	Alberto Lora	3	0	3
8	FW	(Spain)	10	Nacho Novo	2	0	2
8	MF	(Portugal)	3	André Castro	2	0	2
8	MF	(Uruguay)	8	Sebastián Eguren	2	0	2
8	DF	(Spain)	33	Álex Gálvez	2	0	2
14	MF	(Spain)	6	Carmelo	1	0	1
14	DF	(Spain)	2	Alberto Botía	1	0	1
14	MF	(Spain)	28	Juan Muñiz	0	1	1
14				Own goal	1	0	1
				TOTALS	42	1	43

=== Disciplinary record ===
Number	Nation	Position	Name	La Liga		Copa del Rey		Total	
Number	Nation	Position	Name	Yellow card	Red card	Yellow card	Red card	Yellow card	Red card
1	(Spain)	GK	Juan Pablo	2	0	0	0	2	0
2	(Spain)	DF	Alberto Botía	14	0	0	0	14	0
3	(Portugal)	MF	André Castro	7	0	0	0	7	0
5	(Spain)	MF	Alberto Rivera	4	0	0	0	4	0
6	(Spain)	DF	Carmelo	5	1	1	0	6	1
7	(Spain)	MF	Ayoze	6	0	0	0	6	0
8	(Uruguay)	MF	Sebastián Eguren	8	1	1	0	9	1
9	(Croatia)	FW	Mate Bilić	4	0	1	0	5	0
10	(Spain)	FW	Nacho Novo	2	0	0	0	2	0
11	(Spain)	MF	Alberto Lora	10	2	0	0	10	2
12	(France)	DF	Grégory Arnolin	5	0	0	0	5	0
14	(Spain)	DF	Iván Hernández	4	0	0	0	4	0
15	(Spain)	DF	Roberto Canella	6	1	0	0	6	1
16	(Spain)	MF	Sergio Álvarez	1	0	1	0	2	0
17	(Uruguay)	DF	Damián Suárez	5	0	0	0	5	0
18	(Spain)	FW	Luis Morán	3	0	0	0	3	0
19	(Spain)	FW	Gastón Sangoy	1	0	0	0	1	0
20	(Spain)	MF	Miguel de las Cuevas	4	0	0	0	4	0
21	(Spain)	MF	Nacho Cases	6	0	0	0	6	0
23	(Spain)	FW	David Barral	9	0	1	0	10	0
24	(Argentina)	FW	Óscar Trejo	5	0	0	0	5	0
25	(Spain)	GK	Iván Cuéllar	1	0	0	0	1	0
26	(Spain)	DF	Pedro Orfila	2	0	0	0	2	0
31	(Spain)	DF	Álex Menéndez	1	0	1	0	2	0
32	(Guinea-Bissau)	MF	Formose Mendy	1	0	0	0	1	0
33	(Spain)	DF	Álex Gálvez	7	0	0	0	7	0
			TOTALS	120	5	6	0	126	5
