= 2012–13 Sporting de Gijón season =

Real Sporting
2012–13 season
- Chairman: Manuel Vega-Arango
- Manager: José Ramón Sandoval
- Stadium: El Molinón
- Segunda División: 10th
- Copa del Rey: Round of 32
- Top goalscorer: League: David Rodríguez (12); All: David Rodríguez (12)
- Highest home attendance: 19,951 vs Real Madrid Castilla (30 March 2013)
- Lowest home attendance: 7,700 vs Mirandés (Cup, 17 October 2012)
- Average home league attendance: 15,880
Home colours	Away colours	Third colours

The 2012–13 Sporting de Gijón season was the first season that the club played in Segunda División after the relegation from the highest tier of football in Spain, La Liga.

== Players ==
=== Current squad ===
Note: Flags indicate national team as defined under FIFA eligibility rules; some limited exceptions apply. Players may hold more than one non-FIFA nationality.

No.	Pos.	Nation	Player
1	GK	ESP	Juan Pablo
2	DF	ESP	Luis Hernández
3	DF	ESP	Pedro Orfila
4	MF	ESP	Mandi
5	MF	ESP	Ricardo León
7	MF	ESP	Javier Casquero
8	MF	ESP	Juan Muñiz
9	FW	CRO	Mate Bilić
10	FW	ARG	Gastón Sangoy
11	MF	ESP	Alberto Lora
12	DF	FRA	Grégory Arnolin
13	GK	ESP	Raúl Domínguez

No.	Pos.	Nation	Player
14	DF	ESP	Iván Hernández
15	DF	ESP	Roberto Canella (captain)
16	DF	COL	Bernardo Espinosa
17	DF	ESP	Landeira
18	FW	ESP	David Rodríguez
19	MF	ESP	Carmona
20	DF	ESP	Borja López
21	MF	ESP	Nacho Cases
22	MF	GNB	Formose Mendy
23	MF	ESP	Cristian Bustos
24	FW	ARG	Óscar Trejo
25	GK	ESP	Iván Cuéllar

- Borja López started the season with the number 31, and Luis Hernández with the number 28.

=== Youth system ===
Note: Flags indicate national team as defined under FIFA eligibility rules; some limited exceptions apply. Players may hold more than one non-FIFA nationality.

No.	Pos.	Nation	Player
26	DF	ESP	Álex Menéndez
27	MF	ESP	Álex Barrera
29	FW	ESP	Miguel Ángel Guerrero

No.	Pos.	Nation	Player
32	MF	ESP	Santi Jara
33	FW	MLI	Adama Touré

=== Squad changes ===
==== In ====
P	Nat.	Name	From	Type	Transfer Window
DF	(Spain)	Sergio	CA Osasuna	Free agent	Summer
MF	(Spain)	Mandi	Real Madrid Castilla	Transfer	Summer
FW	(Spain)	Guerrero	Reserve team	Promoted	Summer
DF	(Spain)	Marcos Landeira	Reserve team	Promoted	Summer
MF	(Spain)	Carlos Carmona	FC Barcelona B	Free agent	Summer
FW	(Portugal)	Hugo Vieira	(Portugal) Benfica	Loan	Summer
FW	(Spain)	David Rodríguez	Celta de Vigo	Loan	Summer
MF	(Guinea-Bissau)	Formose Mendy	Reserve team	Promoted	Summer
DF	(Colombia)	Bernardo	Sevilla	Loan	Winter 2012–13
MF	(Spain)	Cristian Bustos	Sevilla	Loan	Winter 2012–13
DF	(Spain)	Luis Hernández	Reserve team	Promoted	Winter 2012–13
DF	(Spain)	Borja López	Reserve team	Promoted	Winter 2012–13
MF	(Spain)	Javier Casquero	Almería	Free agent	Winter 2012–13

==== Out ====
P	Nat.	Name	To	Type	Transfer window
FW	(Spain)	David Barral	(Turkey) Orduspor	Transfer	Summer
MF	(Spain)	Alberto Rivera	Elche	Free agent	Summer
MF	(Uruguay)	Sebastián Eguren	(Paraguay) Libertad	Mutual consent	Summer
DF	(Uruguay)	Damián Suárez	Elche	Mutual consent	Summer
DF	(Spain)	Alberto Botía	Sevilla	Transfer	Summer
MF	(Spain)	Ayoze		Released	Summer
MF	(Spain)	Luis Morán		Released	Summer
DF	(Spain)	Sergio		Retired	October 2012
FW	(Portugal)	Hugo Vieira	(Portugal) Benfica	Mutual consent	Winter 2012–13
MF	(Spain)	Miguel de las Cuevas	Osasuna	Loan	Winter 2012–13
MF	(Spain)	Carmelo	(Thailand) Buriram United	Mutual consent	February 2013

== Technical staff ==
Position	Staff
Manager	(Spain) José Ramón Sandoval
Assistant Manager	(Spain) Ismael Martínez
Goalkeeping Coach	(Spain) Sergio Sánchez
Physical Fitness Coach	(Spain) Pablo Muñiz
Physical Fitness Coach	(Spain) Nacho Sancho
Director of Football	(Spain) Raúl Lozano
Delegate	(Spain) Quini
Academy Director	(Spain) José María M. Acebal
Head Coach Reserve Team	(Spain) Abelardo Fernández

Last updated: October 2012
Source: Sporting de Gijón Official Website

=== Managerial changes ===
Outgoing manager	Manner of departure	Date of vacancy	Replaced by	Date of appointment	Position in table
(Spain) Manolo Sánchez	Sacked	18 October 2012	(Spain) José Ramón Sandoval	18 October 2012	17th

== Pre-season matches ==
14 July 2012	Sporting de Gijón	5 – 1	Sporting de Gijón B	Escuela de Fútbol de Mareo, Gijón
11:30	de las Cuevas 2', 37'; Bilić 10'; Sangoy 55', 63'	Summary	Íñigo 9'	Attendance: 700; Referee: González Fuertes

18 July 2012	Lealtad	0 – 4	Sporting de Gijón	Les Caleyes, Villaviciosa
19:30		Summary	Carmelo 15', 20'; Guerrero 60'; Bilić 83' (pen.)	Attendance: 1,100; Referee: Ruiz Álvarez

21 July 2012	Marino de Luanco	1 – 1	Sporting de Gijón	Miramar, Luanco
19:45	Chus Hevia 56' (pen.)	Summary	Álex Barrera 90'	Attendance: 2,200; Referee: Ruiz Álvarez

25 July 2012	UD Logroñés	1 – 2	Sporting de Gijón	Las Gaunas, Logroño
20:00	Alejandro 50'	Summary	Bilić 20', 41'	Referee: García Ballesteros

29 July 2012 Trofeo Emma Cuervo	Deportivo de La Coruña	1 – 4	Sporting de Gijón	Pepe Barrera, Ribadeo
19:00	Saúl 20'	Summary	Bilić 4'; Trejo 14'; Sangoy 69', 89'	Attendance: 3,500; Referee: Corral García

1 August 2012 Trofeo; Ramón Losada	Sporting de Gijón	1 – 1	Valladolid	La Veigona, Luarca
19:30	Carmelo 47'	Summary	Javi Guerra 31'	Attendance: 700; Referee: Fernández

4 August 2012	Salamanca	0 – 1	Sporting de Gijón	El Helmántico, Villares de la Reina
		Summary	Álex Menéndez 84'	Attendance: 1,931; Referee: Díez Cano

8 August 2012 45 minutes game	Celta	0 – 1	Sporting de Gijón	Anxo Carro, Lugo
		Summary	Sangoy 2'	Attendance: 3,000; Referee: Pérez Pallás

8 August 2012 45 minutes game	Lugo	0 – 2	Sporting de Gijón	Anxo Carro, Lugo
		Summary	Bilić 10'; Luis Morán 26'	Attendance: 3,000; Referee: Pérez Pallás

11 August 2012 Trofeo Villa de Gijón	Sporting de Gijón	0 – 2	Vitória de Guimarães	El Molinón, Gijón
21:00		Summary	Defendi 48' 73'	Attendance: 9,000; Referee: Piñeiro Crespo

== Competitions ==
=== Segunda División ===
==== League table ====
Pos	Team	Pld	W	D	L	GF	GA	GD	Pts
8	Real Madrid Castilla	42	17	8	17	80	62	+18	59
9	Barcelona B	42	15	12	15	76	71	+5	57
10	Sporting Gijón	42	15	11	16	60	53	+7	56 (Note: SPG 1–1 LUG; LUG 1–2 SPG)
11	Lugo	42	15	11	16	46	54	−8	56
12	Numancia	42	13	16	13	53	55	−2	55

Source: LFP - Liga Adelante
Rules for classification: 1st points; 2nd head-to-head points; 3rd head-to-head goal difference; 4th head-to-head goals scored; 5th goal difference; 6th number of goals scored; 7th Fair-play points

==== Results summary ====
Overall								Home						Away					
Pld	W	D	L	GF	GA	GD	Pts	W	D	L	GF	GA	GD	W	D	L	GF	GA	GD
42	15	11	16	60	53	+7	56	10	6	5	35	19	+16	5	5	11	25	34	−9

Last updated: June 8, 2013.
Source: Competitive matches

==== Positions by round ====
Round	1	2	3	4	5	6	7	8	9	10	11	12	13	14	15	16	17	18	19	20	21	22	23	24	25	26	27	28	29	30	31	32	33	34	35	36	37	38	39	40	41	42
Ground	A	H	A	H	A	H	A	H	A	H	A	H	A	H	A	H	A	H	H	A	H	H	A	H	A	H	A	H	A	H	A	H	A	H	A	H	A	H	A	A	H	A
Result	L	L	D	D	L	W	L	W	L	W	W	D	L	L	D	D	D	W	W	D	D	D	D	L	W	L	W	W	L	W	W	W	L	W	L	L	L	W	W	L	D	L
Position	21	21	19	20	21	18	20	17	17	16	12	14	16	18	18	16	17	16	14	15	15	14	14	15	14	15	15	13	13	12	10	10	12	9	9	10	12	10	9	9	10	10

Source: BDFútbol
A = Away; H = Home; W = Win; D = Draw; L = Loss

==== Matches ====
19 August 2012 1	Numancia	2 – 0	Real Sporting	Los Pajaritos, Soria
19:00	Nieto 34'; Cedric 58'	Summary		Attendance: 3,853; Referee: Prieto Iglesias

25 August 2012 2	Real Sporting	2 – 3	Murcia	El Molinón, Gijón
19:00	Bilić 6'; Juan Muñiz 82'	Summary	Nico Martínez 11'; Matilla 42'; Kike 51'	Attendance: 17,000; Referee: Ocón Arraiz

2 September 2012 3	Racing de Santander	0 – 0	Real Sporting	El Sardinero, Santander
12:00		Summary		Attendance: 10,091; Referee: José María Sánchez Martínez

9 September 2012 4	Real Sporting	1 – 1	Lugo	El Molinón, Gijón
18:00	David Rodríguez 35'	Summary	Óscar Díaz 41'	Attendance: 19,800; Referee: Pino Zamorano

15 September 2012 5	Elche	2 – 1	Real Sporting	Martínez Valero, Elche
18:00	Coro 9'; Albácar 88' (pen.)	Summary	Nacho Cases 64'	Attendance: 6,888; Referee: López Acera

22 September 2012 6	Real Sporting	2 – 1	Alcorcón	El Molinón, Gijón
18:00	Iván Hernández 49'; David Rodríguez 78'	Summary	Iván Hernández 15' (o.g.)	Attendance: 17,500; Referee: Valdés Aller

29 September 2012 7	Girona	3 – 1	Real Sporting	Montilivi, Girona
16:00	Benja 1', 11'; Tébar 21'	Summary	Trejo 82'	Attendance: 1,487; Referee: Lesma López

7 October 2012 8	Real Sporting	2 – 0	Villarreal	El Molinón, Gijón
12:00	David Rodríguez 39'; Sangoy 88'	Summary		Attendance: 19,000; Referee: Melero López

13 October 2012 9	Barcelona B	3 – 0	Real Sporting	Mini Estadi, Barcelona
18:00	Luis Alberto 38'; Dongou 59'Joan Román 86'	Summary		Attendance: 4,089; Referee: Arias López

20 October 2012 10	Real Sporting	2 – 1	Almería	El Molinón, Gijón
18:00	Bilić 47'; Carmona 77'	Summary	Verza 68'	Attendance: 17,700; Referee: Juan Martínez Munuera

28 October 2012 11	Real Madrid Castilla	2 – 4	Real Sporting	Alfredo di Stéfano, Madrid
12:00	Álex 43', 57' (pen.)	Summary	Carmona 7'; Bilić 13', 57'; De las Cuevas 69'	Attendance: 6,000; Referee: Jaime Latre

4 November 2012 12	Real Sporting	0 – 0	Sabadell	El Molinón, Gijón
20:00		Summary		Attendance: 17,100; Referee: Mariscal Sánchez

10 November 2012 13	Guadalajara	2 – 1	Real Sporting	Pedro Escartín, Guadalajara
18:00	Azkorra 18'; Susaeta 37' (pen.)	Summary	Juan Muñiz 33'	Attendance: 5,000; Referee: Figueroa Vázquez

16 November 2012 14	Real Sporting	2 – 3	Ponferradina	El Molinón, Gijón
21:00	Sangoy 17'; David Rodríguez 24'	Summary	Acorán 23'; Yuri 56' (pen.); Nano 89'	Attendance: 17,000; Referee: José María Sánchez Martínez

24 November 2012 15	Hércules	1 – 1	Real Sporting	Rico Pérez, Alicante
18:00	Sarpong 38'	Summary	David Rodríguez 32'	Attendance: 6,285; Referee: Bikandi Garrido

1 December 2012 16	Real Sporting	1 – 1	Las Palmas	El Molinón, Gijón
18:00	David Rodríguez 60'	Summary	Vitolo 24'	Attendance: 14,000; Referee: Arias López

9 December 2012 17	Córdoba	1 – 1	Real Sporting	Nuevo Arcángel, Córdoba
12:00	Pedro 33'	Summary	Canella 83'	Attendance: 18,375; Referee: Sureda Cuenca

16 December 2012 18	Real Sporting	3 – 0	Xerez	El Molinón, Gijón
17:00	Bilić 54', 87'; Nacho Cases 84'	Summary		Attendance: 14,810; Referee: Pérez Pallás

22 December 2012 19	Real Sporting	1 – 0	Huesca	El Molinón, Gijón
18:00	Sangoy 62'	Summary		Attendance: 16,600; Referee: Arcediano Monescillo

5 January 2013 20	Recreativo	1 – 1	Real Sporting	Nuevo Colombino, Huelva
18:00	Chuli 69'	Summary	Mandi 10'	Attendance: 4,001; Referee: Ocón Arraiz

13 January 2012 21	Real Sporting	1 – 1	Mirandés	El Molinón, Gijón
12:00	Trejo 16'	Summary	Mujika 27'	Attendance: 13,739; Referee: Medié Jiménez

20 January 2012 22	Real Sporting	1 – 1	Numancia	El Molinón, Gijón
12:00	Bernardo 80'	Summary	Del Pino 12'	Attendance: 13,525; Referee: Ricardo de Burgos Bengoetxea

26 January 2012 23	Murcia	1 – 1	Real Sporting	Nueva Condomina, Murcia
18:00	Emilio Sánchez 64'	Summary	Bilić 85'	Referee: Pérez Pallás

2 February 2013 24	Real Sporting	1 – 2	Racing de Santander	El Molinón, Gijón
18:00	David Rodríguez 17'	Summary	Quini 77'; Koné 83'	Attendance: 15,840; Referee: Jaime Latre

9 February 2012 25	Lugo	1 – 2	Real Sporting	Anxo Carro, Lugo
18:00	Óscar Díaz 67'	Summary	Guerrero 4'; Trejo 75'	Attendance: 4,800; Referee: Valdés Aller

17 February 2013 26	Real Sporting	0 – 2	Elche	El Molinón, Gijón
12:00		Summary	Coro 17', 69'	Attendance: 17,947; Referee: Figueroa Vázquez

23 February 2013 27	Alcorcón	0 – 1	Real Sporting	Santo Domingo, Alcorcón
18:00		Summary	Sangoy 34'	Attendance: 4,000; Referee: Melero López

3 March 2013 28	Real Sporting	4 – 0	Girona	El Molinón, Gijón
20:00	Trejo 20'; Bilić 25'; Carmona 80'; David Rodríguez 85'	Summary		Attendance: 17,800; Referee: Ocón Arraiz

10 March 2013 29	Villarreal	2 – 1	Real Sporting	El Madrigal, Villarreal
12:00	Uche 37', 89'	Summary	Sangoy 66'	Attendance: 10,000; Referee: Arcediano Monescillo

16 March 2013 30	Real Sporting	5 – 2	Barcelona B	El Molinón, Gijón
18:00	Santi Jara 41'; Bilić 45'; Sangoy 66'; Trejo 83'; David Rodríguez 87'	Summary	Rafinha 2'; Espinosa 90'	Attendance: 16,124; Referee: Bikandi Garrido

24 March 2013 31	Almería	0 – 1	Real Sporting	Mediterráneo, Almería
17:00		Summary	Santi Jara 31'	Attendance: 9,451; Referee: Juan Martínez Munuera

30 March 2013 32	Real Sporting	1 – 0	Real Madrid Castilla	El Molinón, Gijón
18:00	Canella 40'	Summary		Attendance: 19,951; Referee: Prieto Iglesias

7 April 2013 33	Sabadell	4 – 3	Real Sporting	Nova Creu Alta, Sabadell
20:00	Aníbal 1'; Abraham Paz 8'; Collantes 30'; Lanzarote 48' (pen.)	Summary	Sangoy 30'; David Rodríguez 45'; Bilić 60'	Attendance: 3,758; Referee: José María Sánchez Martínez

13 April 2013 34	Real Sporting	3 – 0	Guadalajara	El Molinón, Gijón
18:00	Sangoy 5'; Bilić 70' (pen.); David Rodríguez 87'	Summary		Attendance: 16,800; Referee: Valdés Aller

20 April 2013 35	Ponferradina	1 – 0	Real Sporting	Estadio El Toralín, Ponferrada
18:00	Alan 67'	Summary		Attendance: 8,500; Referee: Ricardo de Burgos Bengoetxea

27 April 2013 36	Real Sporting	0 – 1	Hércules	El Molinón, Gijón
18:00		Summary	Paglialunga 81'	Attendance: 12,439; Referee: López Acera

4 May 2013 37	Las Palmas	4 – 2	Real Sporting	Estadio Gran Canaria, Las Palmas
18:00	Vitolo 21' (pen.), 57'; Chrisantus 83'; Thievy 92'	Summary	David Rodríguez 19' (pen.); Carlos Carmona 80'	Attendance: 12,040; Referee: Pino Zamorano

11 May 2013 38	Real Sporting	3 – 0	Córdoba	El Molinón, Gijón
18:00	Carmona 3'; Guerrero 34'; Santi Jara 85'	Summary		Attendance: 10,621; Referee: Juan Martínez Munuera

18 May 2013 39	Xerez	0 – 2	Real Sporting	Chapín, Jerez de la Frontera
18:00	Casquero 32', 57'	Summary		Attendance: 2,077; Referee: Pérez Pallás

25 May 2013 40	Huesca	2 – 1	Real Sporting	El Alcoraz, Huesca
16:00	Pacheco 45'; Tariq 85'	Summary	Juan Muñiz 23'	Referee: Figueroa Vázquez

2 June 2013 41	Real Sporting	0 – 0	Recreativo	El Molinón, Gijón
18:00		Summary		Attendance: 8,187; Referee: Valdés Aller

8 June 2013 42	Mirandés	2 – 1	Real Sporting	Anduva, Miranda de Ebro
19:00	Luis Morán 3', 77'	Summary	Bernardo 46'	Attendance: 4,796; Referee: Mariscal Sánchez

=== Copa del Rey ===
==== Matches ====
12 September 2012 Second round	Real Sporting	2 – 0	Girona	El Molinón, Gijón
21:00	Nacho Cases 41'; Trejo 44'	Summary		Attendance: 10,500; Referee: Prieto Iglesias

17 October 2012 Third round	Real Sporting	2 – 1	Mirandés	El Molinón, Gijón
21:00	Sangoy 74', 85'	Summary	Díaz de Cerio 22'	Attendance: 7,700; Referee: Bikandi Garrido

1 November 2012 Round of 32; First leg	Real Sporting	1 – 0	Osasuna	El Molinón, Gijón
19:00	Sangoy 13'	Summary		Attendance: 9,100; Referee: Iglesias Villanueva

27 November 2012 Round of 32; Second leg	Osasuna	2 – 0	Real Sporting	El Sadar, Pamplona
19:00	Llorente 70'; Rubén 76'	Summary		Attendance: 11,109; Referee: F. Teixeira Vitienes

== Squad statistics ==
=== Appearances and goals ===
No.	Pos	Nat	Player	Total		Segunda División		Copa del Rey	
No.	Pos	Nat	Player	Apps	Goals	Apps	Goals	Apps	Goals
1	GK	(Spain) ESP	Juan Pablo	20	0	18+2	0	0+0	0
2	DF	(Spain) ESP	Luis Hernández	21	0	17+3	0	0+1	0
3	DF	(Spain) ESP	Pedro Orfila	11	0	7+0	0	4+0	0
4	MF	(Spain) ESP	Mandi	26	1	21+3	1	2+0	0
5	MF	(Spain) ESP	Ricardo León	10	0	3+4	0	2+1	0
6	MF	(Spain) ESP	Carmelo	6	0	2+4	0	0+0	0
7	MF	(Spain) ESP	Javier Casquero	9	2	6+3	2	0+0	0
7	FW	(Portugal) POR	Hugo Vieira	4	0	0+2	0	1+1	0
8	MF	(Spain) ESP	Juan Muñiz	22	3	10+8	3	3+1	0
9	FW	(Croatia) CRO	Mate Bilić	33	11	20+12	11	1+0	0
10	FW	(Argentina) ARG	Gastón Sangoy	39	11	25+10	8	3+1	3
11	MF	(Spain) ESP	Alberto Lora	32	0	26+4	0	1+1	0
12	DF	(France) FRA	Grégory Arnolin	18	0	13+1	0	4+0	0
13	GK	(Spain) ESP	Raúl Domínguez	1	0	1+0	0	0+0	0
14	DF	(Spain) ESP	Iván Hernández	28	1	26+0	1	2+0	0
15	DF	(Spain) ESP	Roberto Canella	37	2	35+0	2	2+0	0
16	DF	(Colombia) COL	Bernardo Espinosa	22	2	22+0	2	0+0	0
17	DF	(Spain) ESP	Marcos Landeira	7	0	4+1	0	1+1	0
18	FW	(Spain) ESP	David Rodríguez	38	12	28+9	12	1+0	0
19	MF	(Spain) ESP	Carlos Carmona	32	5	13+17	5	2+0	0
20	DF	(Spain) ESP	Borja López	21	0	19+0	0	2+0	0
20	MF	(Spain) ESP	Miguel de las Cuevas	14	1	5+7	1	1+1	0
21	MF	(Spain) ESP	Nacho Cases	33	3	30+2	2	1+0	1
22	MF	(Guinea-Bissau) GNB	Formose Mendy	15	0	2+11	0	1+1	0
23	MF	(Spain) ESP	Cristian Bustos	16	0	16+0	0	0+0	0
23	DF	(Spain) ESP	Sergio Fernández	1	0	1+0	0	0+0	0
24	FW	(Argentina) ARG	Óscar Trejo	42	6	38+0	5	2+2	1
25	GK	(Spain) ESP	Iván Cuéllar	27	0	23+0	0	4+0	0
26	DF	(Spain) ESP	Álex Menéndez	6	0	4+0	0	2+0	0
27	MF	(Spain) ESP	Álex Barrera	15	0	7+5	0	3+0	0
29	FW	(Spain) ESP	Miguel Ángel Guerrero	17	2	9+8	2	0+0	0
32	MF	(Spain) ESP	Santi Jara	16	3	14+1	3	0+1	0
33	FW	(Mali) MLI	Adama Touré	1	0	0+1	0	0+0	0

=== Disciplinary record ===
N	P	Nat.	Name	2ª División			Copa del Rey			Total			Notes
N	P	Nat.	Name	Yellow card	Second yellow card	Red card	Yellow card	Second yellow card	Red card	Yellow card	Second yellow card	Red card	Notes
24	FW	(Argentina)	Óscar Trejo	8		1	3			11		1	
25	GK	(Spain)	Iván Cuéllar	4		1				4		1	2 times captain
22	MF	(Guinea-Bissau)	Formose Mendy			1	1			1		1	
12	DF	(France)	Grégory Arnolin	8	2		1			9	2		
14	DF	(Spain)	Iván Hernández	15	1		1			16	1		27 times captain
4	MF	(Spain)	Mandi	11	1					11	1		
11	MF	(Spain)	Alberto Lora	8	1					8	1		6 times captain
26	MF	(Spain)	Álex Barrera	3	1					3	1		
1	GK	(Spain)	Juan Pablo	2	1					2	1		5 times captain
10	FW	(Argentina)	Gastón Sangoy	12						12			
20	FW	(Spain)	Borja López	11						11			
16	DF	(Colombia)	Bernardo	10						10			
2	DF	(Spain)	Luis Hernández	8			1			9			
9	FW	(Croatia)	Mate Bilić	8						8			
21	MF	(Spain)	Nacho Cases	8						8			
15	DF	(Spain)	Roberto Canella	7						7			6 times captain
23	FW	(Spain)	Cristian Bustos	6						6			
19	MF	(Spain)	Carlos Carmona	4						4			
5	MF	(Spain)	Ricardo León	2			1			3			
7	MF	(Spain)	Javier Casquero	3						3			
8	MF	(Spain)	Juan Muñiz	3						3			
3	DF	(Spain)	Pedro Orfila	2						2			
17	DF	(Spain)	Marcos Landeira	2						2			
18	FW	(Spain)	David Rodríguez	2						2			
7	FW	(Portugal)	Hugo Vieira	1						1			
20	MF	(Spain)	Miguel de las Cuevas	1						1			
23	FW	(Spain)	Sergio Fernández	1						1			
26	DF	(Spain)	Álex Menéndez	1						1			
29	FW	(Spain)	Miguel Ángel Guerrero	1						1			
32	FW	(Spain)	Santi Jara	1						1			
6	MF	(Spain)	Carmelo										
13	GK	(Spain)	Raúl Domínguez										
33	FW	(Mali)	Adama Touré										

Last updated: 11 March 2013
Source: Competitive matches and RFEF.es
Ordered by (red card) , (second yellow card) and (yellow card)
(yellow card) = Number of bookings; (second yellow card) = Number of sending offs after a second yellow card; (red card) = Number of sending offs by a direct red card.
