= 2015–16 Sporting de Gijón season =

Real Sporting
2015–16 season
- President: Antonio Veiga
- Manager: Abelardo
- Stadium: El Molinón
- La Liga: 17th
- Copa del Rey: Round of 32
- Top goalscorer: League: Antonio Sanabria (11); All: Antonio Sanabria (11)
- Highest home attendance: 28,140; Sporting 1–3 Barcelona (17 February 2016)
- Lowest home attendance: 19,536; Sporting 0–3 Levante (22 November 2015)
- Average home league attendance: 23,196
Home colours	Away colours	Third colours

The 2015–16 Sporting de Gijón season was the 41st season that the club will play in La Liga, the first after the promotion from Segunda División in the last season.

== Season overview ==
In its return to La Liga three years later, Sporting continued sanctioned due to a delay in payments to players during the previous season. Sporting was only allowed to sign on loan three under-23 players.

Sporting started the season earning a point against Real Madrid. The club did not win its first game until the fourth round, when it defeated Deportivo La Coruña by 2–3 at Estadio Riazor with two goals of Antonio Sanabria and one of Álex Menéndez.

Sporting dropped to the relegation positions for the first time after the round 18. It was defeated 1–2 by Getafe. The club avoided the relegation in the last after winning 2–0 against Villarreal and taking advantage of the win of Real Betis against Getafe, which dropped finally to the 18th position.

== Players ==
=== Current squad ===
N	Pos.	Nat.	Name	Age	Since	App	Goals	Ends	Transfer fee	Notes
1	GK	(Spain)	Iván Cuéllar (vice-captain)	31	2008	133	0	2018	Free	
2	DF	(Spain)	Luis Hernández	26	2013	98	1	2016	Youth system	
3	DF	(Spain)	Álex Menéndez	23	2011	36	0	2016	Youth system	
4	DF	(Chile)	Igor Lichnovsky	21	2016 (Winter)	0	0	2016	Loan	Second nationality: Austria
5	DF	(Colombia)	Bernardo	25	2013 (Winter)	95	6	2016	Free	Second nationality: Spain
6	MF	(Spain)	Sergio Álvarez	23	2013	82	5	2019	Youth system	
8	MF	(Spain)	Álex Barrera	24	2012	61	4	2016	Youth system	
9	FW	(Spain)	Miguel Ángel Guerrero	24	2012	65	14	2016	Youth system	
10	MF	(Spain)	Nacho Cases	27	2011	133	7	2018	Youth system	
11	MF	(Spain)	Alberto Lora (captain)	28	2007	209	8	2018	Youth system	
13	GK	(Spain)	Alberto García (3rd captain)	30	2013	10	0	2017	Free	
15	FW	(Spain)	Roberto Canella	27	2008	225	6	2019	Youth system	
16	FW	(Spain)	Carlos Castro	20	2014	30	9	2017	Youth system	
17	MF	(Spain)	Omar Mascarell	22	2015	0	0	2016	Loan	
18	DF	(Spain)	Isma López	25	2013	44	6	2019	Free	
19	MF	(Spain)	Carlos Carmona	27	2012	103	13	2019	Free	
20	FW	(Paraguay)	Antonio Sanabria	18	2015	0	0	2016	Loan	
21	DF	(Bosnia and Herzegovina)	Ognjen Vranješ	26	2016 (Winter)	0	0	2016	Free	
22	MF	(Spain)	Pablo Pérez	21	2015	35	7	2019	Youth system	
23	MF	(Spain)	Jony	23	2014	46	8	2016	Youth system	
24	DF	(Algeria)	Rachid Aït-Atmane	22	2014	15	0	2018	Youth system	Second nationality: France
25	MF	(Croatia)	Alen Halilović	19	2015	0	0	2016	Loan	

- Last updated: 26 January 2016
- Source: Ages to 30 June 2015, except new incomes in 2016. Stats updated as of the end of the 2014–15 season. Only league and playoff games included.
- Ordered by squad number.

=== Reserve team players ===
Note: Flags indicate national team as defined under FIFA eligibility rules; some limited exceptions apply. Players may hold more than one non-FIFA nationality.

No.	Pos.	Nation	Player
26	GK	ESP	Dennis
27	FW	ESP	Sergio Mendigutxia
28	DF	ESP	Jorge Meré

No.	Pos.	Nation	Player
29	DF	ESP	Julio Rodríguez
30	DF	ESP	Alberto
32	FW	ESP	Álvaro Bustos
33	MF	CMR	Dani Ndi

=== In ===
No.	Pos.	Nat.	Name	Age	Moving from	Type	Transfer window	Ends	Transfer fee	Source
15	DF	(Spain)	Roberto Canella	27	Deportivo La Coruña	Loan return	Summer	2017	Free	
14	MF	(Spain)	Alberto Guitián	24	Sporting B	Promoted	Summer	2017	Free	
17	MF	(Spain)	Omar Mascarell	22	Derby County	Loan	Summer	2016	Free	
20	FW	(Paraguay)	Antonio Sanabria	18	Roma	Loan	Summer	2016	Free	
25	MF	(Croatia)	Alen Halilović	19	Barcelona B	Loan	Summer	2016	Free	
4	DF	(Chile)	Igor Lichnovsky	21	Porto	Loan	Winter	2016	Free	
21	DF	(Bosnia and Herzegovina)	Ognjen Vranješ	26	Gaziantepspor	Transfer	Winter	2016	Free	

=== Out ===
No.	Pos.	Nat.	Name	Age	Moving to	Type	Transfer window	Transfer fee	Source
14	DF	(Spain)	Iván Hernández	35	Retired	End of contract	Summer	Free	El Desmarque
15	FW	(Spain)	Álex Serrano	20	Espanyol B (Spain)	End of contract	Summer	Free	RCD Espanyol
17	FW	(Spain)	Santi Jara	24	Albacete (Spain)	Mutual consent	Summer	Free	Real Sporting
4	DF	(Spain)	Mandi	26	Elche (Spain)	Mutual consent	Summer	Free	Real Sporting
7	MF	(Spain)	Juan Muñiz	23	Gimnàstic (Spain)	Mutual consent	Winter	Free	Gimnàstic Tarragona
21	MF	(Spain)	Hugo Fraile	28	Elche (Spain)	Mutual consent	Winter	Free	
14	MF	(Spain)	Alberto Guitián	25	Zaragoza (Spain)	Mutual consent	Winter	Free	

Last updated: February 2016

== Technical staff ==
Position	Staff
Manager	Abelardo Fernández
Assistant Manager	Iñaki Tejada
Goalkeeping Coach	Isidro Fernández
Physical Fitness Coach	Gerardo Ruiz
Director of Football	Nicolás Rodríguez
Delegate	Mario Cotelo
Academy Director	José María M. Acebal

Source: Sporting de Gijón Official Website

== Competitions ==
=== Pre-season and friendlies ===
18 July 2015 Memorial Manolo Preciado; Semifinal	Gimnástica Torrelavega	0–1	Real Sporting	Torrelavega
18:00		Summary	Pérez 12'	Stadium: El Malecón; Attendance: 1,000; Referee: Gutiérrez Zubizarreta
Note: 45-minute game

18 July 2015 Memorial Manolo Preciado; Final	Racing Santander	0–0 (2–1 p)	Real Sporting	Torrelavega
20:00		Summary		Stadium: El Malecón; Attendance: 1,000; Referee: Hernández Díaz
	Penalties
	Francis; Isma Cerro (penalty missed); Chus Hevia		Carmona; Guerrero (penalty missed); Jony (penalty missed)
Note: 45-minutes game

22 July 2015 Friendly	Lealtad	1–9	Real Sporting	Villaviciosa
19:00	Sergio Villanueva 8'	Summary	Mendigutxia 3', 40', 42'; Carmona 35'; Guerrero 58', 74', 87'; López 59'; Muñiz 90'	Stadium: Les Caleyes; Attendance: 2,000; Referee: Alonso Prendes

26 July 2015 Copa Ciudad de Santa Cruz	Tenerife	1–1 (2–3 p)	Real Sporting	Santa Cruz de Tenerife
21:30	Omar 66'	Summary	Jony 88'	Stadium: Heliodoro Rodríguez López; Attendance: 2,687; Referee: Pinto Herrera
	Penalties
	Ricardo (penalty missed); Alberto (penalty missed); Nano; Sanz; Pedro Martín (penalty missed)		Jony; Cases; Muñiz; Menéndez (penalty missed)

29 July 2015 Friendly	Racing Ferrol	1–2	Real Sporting	Ferrol
19:00	Pablo Rey 11'	Summary	Muñiz 70'; Lora 70'	Stadium: A Malata; Referee: Martínez Santos

1 August 2015 Friendly	Real Sporting	1–1	Almería	Luanco
19:00	Guerrero 53'	Summary	Chuli 75'	Stadium: Miramar; Attendance: 2,100; Referee: Fernández Pérez

5 August 2015 Friendly	Ponferradina	1–0	Real Sporting	Ponferrada
20:30	Yuri 25'	Summary		Stadium: El Toralín; Attendance: 3,500; Referee: Arias López

8 August 2015 Trofeo Villa de Gijón	Real Sporting (Spain)	3–1	(Italy) Palermo	Gijón
20:00	Castro 29'; Lora 41'; Mendigutxia 58'	Summary	Quaison 86'	Stadium: El Molinón; Attendance: 12,280; Referee: Iglesias Villanueva

12 August 2015 Aspire Trophy	Real Sporting	0–0	Valladolid	León
20:30		Summary		Stadium: Reino de León; Referee: Holgueras Castellanos
Note: 45-minute game

12 August 2015 Aspire Trophy	Cultural Leonesa	0–1	Real Sporting	León
21:30			Mendigutxia 27'	Stadium: Reino de León
Note: 45-minute game

15 August 2015 110th anniversary game	Real Sporting	0–1	Villarreal	Gijón
		Summary	Baptistão 65'	Stadium: El Molinón; Attendance: 12,304; Referee: Ricardo de Burgos Bengoetxea

3 September 2015 Friendly	Eibar	0–1	Real Sporting	Zamudio
19:00		Summary	Mascarell 74'	Stadium: Gazituaga; Attendance: 500; Referee: Jon Ander González

=== La Liga ===
==== League table ====
Pos	Team	Pld	W	D	L	GF	GA	GD	Pts	Qualification or relegation
15	Deportivo La Coruña	38	8	18	12	45	61	−16	42	
16	Granada	38	10	9	19	46	69	−23	39 (Note: Granada finished ahead of Sporting Gijón on head-to-head record; Granada 2–0 Sporting Gijón, Sporting Gijón 3–3 Granada.)	
17	Sporting Gijón	38	10	9	19	40	62	−22	39	
18	Rayo Vallecano (R)	38	9	11	18	52	73	−21	38	Relegation to Segunda División
19	Getafe (R)	38	9	9	20	37	67	−30	36	Relegation to Segunda División

Source: La Liga, Soccerway
Rules for classification: 1) Points; 2) Head-to-head points; 3) Head-to-head goal difference; 4) Goal difference; 5) Goals scored; 6) Fair-play points; 7) Play-off.
(R) Relegated

==== Results summary ====
Overall								Home						Away					
Pld	W	D	L	GF	GA	GD	Pts	W	D	L	GF	GA	GD	W	D	L	GF	GA	GD
38	10	9	19	40	62	−22	39	7	4	8	28	28	0	3	5	11	12	34	−22

==== Positions by round ====
Round	1	2	3	4	5	6	7	8	9	10	11	12	13	14	15	16	17	18	19	20	21	22	23	24	25	26	27	28	29	30	31	32	33	34	35	36	37	38
Ground	H	A	H	A	A	H	A	H	A	H	A	H	A	H	A	H	A	H	A	A	H	A	H	H	A	H	A	H	A	H	A	H	A	H	A	H	A	H
Result	D	D	L	W	L	L	W	D	L	W	L	L	L	W	L	L	L	L	L	L	W	W	D	D	D	L	L	L	L	W	D	L	D	W	L	W	D	W
Position	14	12	17	10	13	15	11	12	17	12	14	16	16	14	14	16	17	18	18	19	19	17	16	16	17	18	19	19	19	19	18	18	18	18	18	18	18	17

Source: BDFútbol
A = Away; H = Home; W = Win; D = Draw; L = Loss

==== Matches ====
Win Draw Loss

22 August 2015 1	Real Sporting	0–0	Real Madrid	Gijón
20:30	Cases (yellow card) 36'; Carmona (yellow card) 66'; Jony (yellow card) 71'; Álvarez (yellow card) 74'	Report		Stadium: El Molinón; Attendance: 27,691; Referee: Estrada Fernández

29 August 2015 2	Real Sociedad	0–0	Real Sporting	San Sebastián
18:30	Illarramendi (yellow card) 25'; Elustondo (yellow card) 59'; De la Bella (yellow card) 62'; Bergara (yellow card) 90+4'	Report	Lora (yellow card) 25'; Álvarez (yellow card) 34'; Jony (yellow card) 84'; Cuéllar (yellow card) 85'; Muñiz (yellow card) 88'	Stadium: Anoeta; Attendance: 22,436; Referee: José María Sánchez Martínez

12 September 2015 3	Real Sporting	0–1	Valencia	Gijón
18:30	Mascarell (yellow card) 45'; López (yellow card) 64'; Pérez (yellow card) 77'	Report	Parejo (yellow card) 30'; Pérez (yellow card) 41'; Fuego (yellow card) 81'; Alcácer 90+1'	Stadium: El Molinón; Attendance: 23,133; Referee: Del Cerro Grande

20 September 2015 4	Deportivo La Coruña	2–3	Real Sporting	A Coruña
16:00	Juanfran 16'; Luis Alberto 28'; Fajr (yellow card) 73'; Sidnei (yellow card) 85'; Luisinho (yellow card) 90+2'	Report	Sanabria 4', 8', (yellow card) 77'; Menéndez 34'; Cases (yellow card) 61'; Carmona (yellow card) 70'	Stadium: Riazor; Attendance: 24,799; Referee: Prieto Iglesias

23 September 2015 5	Rayo Vallecano	2–1	Real Sporting	Madrid
20:00	Trashorras 40' (pen.); Guerra 48'; Baena (yellow card) 73'; Nacho (yellow card) 84'	Report	Bernardo (red card) 39'; Jony 49'; Canella (yellow card) 76'	Stadium: Campo de Vallecas; Attendance: 10,941; Referee: Vicandi Garrido

27 September 2015 6	Real Sporting	1–2	Betis	Gijón
12:00	Castro 17'; Cases (yellow card) 90'	Report	Joaquín 46'; Castro 57'; N'Diaye (yellow card) 69'	Stadium: El Molinón; Attendance: 23,320; Referee: Juan Martínez Munuera

3 October 2015 7	Espanyol	1–2	Real Sporting	Barcelona
20:30	Sánchez (yellow card) 3'; Caicedo (penalty missed) 30' 62'; Cañas (yellow card) 60'; Duarte (yellow card) 70'	Report	Canella (yellow card) 6'; Halilović 10'; Bernardo (yellow card) 29'; Lora (yellow card) 90+2'; Menéndez 90+2'	Stadium: Cornellà-El Prat; Attendance: 16,519; Referee: Clos Gómez

19 October 2015 8	Real Sporting	3–3	Granada	Gijón
20:30	Bernardo 8'; Cases (yellow card) 71', (goal) 88'; Halilović (yellow card) 71'; Álvarez (yellow card) 72'; Guerrero 90+6'	Report	Piti (yellow card) 7', (goal) 21'; Biraghi (yellow card) 39'; Success 41', (yellow card) 64'; Lopes (red card) 81'; Pérez (yellow card) 59'; El-Arabi 73'; Dória (red card) 90+2'	Stadium: El Molinón; Attendance: 19,749; Referee: Álvarez Izquierdo

26 October 2015 9	Athletic Bilbao	3–0	Real Sporting	Bilbao
20:30	Susaeta 29'; Aduriz (penalty missed) 42' 42', 67', (yellow card) 76'	Report	Halilović (yellow card) 14'; Mascarell (yellow card) 23'; Cases (yellow card) 61'	Stadium: San Mamés; Attendance: 40,477; Referee: Iglesias Villanueva

1 November 2015 10	Real Sporting	1–0	Málaga	Gijón
18:15	Halilović 27'; Bernardo (yellow card) 45+1'	Report	Albentosa (yellow card) 38'; Recio (yellow card) 84'; Weligton (yellow card) 86'	Stadium: El Molinón; Attendance: 22,766; Referee: Mateu Lahoz

8 November 2015 11	Atlético Madrid	1–0	Real Sporting	Madrid
18:15	Carrasco (yellow card) 32'; Koke (yellow card) 39'; Filipe Luís (yellow card) 55'; Godín (yellow card) 57'; Griezmann 90+3'	Report	Bernardo (yellow card) 40'; Cases (yellow card) 43'; Cuéllar (yellow card) 69'	Stadium: Vicente Calderón; Attendance: 44,858; Referee: Estrada Fernández

22 November 2015 12	Real Sporting	0–3	Levante	Gijón
12:00	Halilović (yellow card) 45'; Jony (penalty missed) 63'; Canella (yellow card) 64'; López (yellow card) 73'; Cases (yellow card) 90+1'	Report	Deyverson 18', 44'; Feddal 27'; García (yellow card) 51'; Rubén (yellow card) 60'; Toño (yellow card) 61'; P. López (yellow card) 83'; Simão Mate (yellow card) 90+2'	Stadium: El Molinón; Attendance: 19,536; Referee: Melero López

29 November 2015 13	Celta	2–1	Real Sporting	Vigo
22:05	Orellana 15'; Gómez (yellow card) 23'; Cabral (yellow card) 54'; Nolito 85'; Hernández (yellow card) 90+1'	Report	Castro 65'	Stadium: Balaídos; Attendance: 18,039; Referee: Jaime Latre

6 December 2015 14	Real Sporting	3–1	Las Palmas	Gijón
18:15	Sanabria 17', 78', 84'; Hernández (yellow card) 41'; Bernardo (yellow card) 50'	Report	El Zhar 38'; Aythami (yellow card) 40' (yellow-red card) 71'; David Simón (yellow card) 41'	Stadium: El Molinón; Attendance: 22,665; Referee: Undiano Mallenco

13 December 2015 15	Sevilla	2–0	Real Sporting	Seville
20:30	Ndi (yellow card) 32'; Hernández (yellow card) 54' (yellow-red card) 74'; Bernardo (yellow card) 69'	Report	Kolodziejczak (yellow card) 30'; Banega (yellow card) 72'; Gameiro 75' (pen.), 80', (yellow card) 83'	Stadium: Ramón Sánchez Pizjuán; Attendance: 29,211; Referee: Del Cerro Grande

30 December 2015 17	Eibar	2–0	Real Sporting	Eibar
18:30	Keko 55'; Ramis (yellow card) 60'; Borja 62'; Lillo (yellow card) 64'; García (yellow card) 67'	Report	Menéndez (yellow card) 7'; Guitián (yellow card) 39'; Lora (yellow card) 71'	Stadium: Municipal de Ipurua; Attendance: 5,475; Referee: Velasco Carballo

4 January 2016 18	Real Sporting	1–2	Getafe	Gijón
20:30	Sanabria 16'; López (yellow card) 29'; Meré (yellow card) 57'	Report	Damián (yellow card) 25'; Cala (yellow card) 52', (goal) 69'; Pedro León (penalty missed) 58'; Sarabia 71'; Wanderson (yellow card) 89'	Stadium: El Molinón; Attendance: 20,950; Referee: Estrada Fernández

10 January 2016 19	Villarreal	2–0	Real Sporting	Villarreal
12:00	Bakambu 26', 51'; Bruno (yellow card) 53'; Ruiz (yellow card) 61'; Samu (yellow card) 79'; Soldado (yellow card) 87'	Report	Carmona (yellow card) 33'; Cases (yellow card) 87'	Stadium: El Madrigal; Attendance: 15,899; Referee: Gil Manzano

17 January 2016 20	Real Madrid	5–1	Real Sporting	Madrid
	Bale 7'; Ronaldo 9', 18'; Benzema 12', 41'; Modrić (yellow card) 57'	Report	Guerrero (yellow card) 49'; López 61'	Stadium: Santiago Bernabéu; Attendance: 70,365; Referee: Undiano Mallenco

22 January 2016 21	Real Sporting	5–1	Real Sociedad	Gijón
20:30	Carmona 1', (yellow card) 21'; Ndi 9'; Sanabria 44', 53', 81'	Report	Vela 37'; I. Martínez (yellow card) 45+3'; Zaldúa (yellow card) 62'	Stadium: El Molinón; Attendance: 23,032; Referee: Fernández Borbalán

31 January 2016 22	Valencia	0–1	Real Sporting	Valencia
16:00		Report	Sanabria 50' (pen.); Hernández (yellow card) 59'; Vranješ (yellow card) 70'	Stadium: Mestalla; Attendance: 35,277; Referee: González González

6 February 2016 23	Real Sporting	1–1	Deportivo La Coruña	Gijón
22:05	Vranješ (yellow card) 20'; Jony 32' (yellow card) 34'	Report	Arribas (yellow card) 6'; Luis Alberto 41'; Cartabia (yellow card) 89'	Stadium: El Molinón; Attendance: 21,690; Referee: Hernández Hernández

14 February 2016 24	Real Sporting	2–2	Rayo Vallecano	Gijón
20:30 (UTC+1)	Guerrero 5'; Vranješ (yellow card) 27'; Rachid (yellow card) 44'; Halilović 45+1'; Álvarez (yellow card) 63'	Report	Nacho (yellow card) 22'; Quini (yellow card) 30'; Miku 39'; Jozabed 59'; Iturra (yellow card) 62'; Hernández (yellow card) 77'	Stadium: El Molinón; Attendance: 21,789; Referee: Clos Gómez

17 February 2016 16	Real Sporting	1–3	Barcelona	Gijón
18:30 CET (UTC+01:00)	Castro 26'; Meré (yellow card) 27'; Canella (yellow card) 90+1'	Report	Messi 24', 30'; Suárez (penalty missed) 62' 66'; Busquets (yellow card) 78'	Stadium: El Molinón; Attendance: 28,140; Referee: Ricardo de Burgos Bengoetxea
Note: Match was postponed from the original date due to the dispute of the 2015 FIFA Club World Cup by Barcelona.

20 February 2016 25	Betis	1–1	Real Sporting	Seville
20:30	Montoya (yellow card) 32'; Pezzella 67'; N'Diaye (yellow card) 87'	Report	Álvarez (yellow card) 37'; López (yellow card) 60'; Castro 65'; Vranješ (yellow card) 81'	Stadium: Benito Villamarín; Attendance: 39,415; Referee: Álvarez Izquierdo

27 February 2016 26	Real Sporting	2–4	Espanyol	Gijón
18:15	Mascarell (yellow card) 15'; Castro 20', 62', (yellow card) 66'; Meré (yellow card) 35'; López (yellow card) 77'; Sanabria (yellow card) 82'; Cases (red card) 83'	Report	López (yellow card) 17'; Burgui 41'; Gerard 48', 58'; Hernández 80' (o.g.); Ó. Duarte (yellow card) 90+1'	Stadium: El Molinón; Attendance: 20,302; Referee: Velasco Carballo

3 March 2016 27	Granada	2–0	Real Sporting	Granada
20:00	Costa (yellow card) 33'; Lopes (yellow card) 47'; Peñaranda (yellow card) 67'; El-Arabi 72' (pen.), (yellow card) 90'; Babin (yellow card) 85'; Pérez (yellow card) 90+2'; Success 90+3', (yellow card) 90+4'	Report	Meré (yellow card) 15'; Lora (yellow card) 24'; Mascarell (yellow card) 45+1'; Álvarez (yellow card) 78' (yellow-red card) 84'	Stadium: Nuevo Los Cármenes; Attendance: 15,441; Referee: Estrada Fernández

6 March 2016 28	Real Sporting	0–2	Athletic Bilbao	Gijón
18:15	Vranješ (yellow card) 26'	Report	Beñat 27'; Laporte (yellow card) 52' (yellow-red card) 74'; De Marcos 59'; Balenziaga (yellow card) 90+2'	Stadium: El Molinón; Attendance: 23,227; Referee: Del Cerro Grande

11 March 2016 29	Málaga	1–0	Real Sporting	Málaga
20:30	Juanpi 25'; Rosales (yellow card) 69'	Report	López (yellow card) 18'; Álvarez (yellow card) 52'; Pérez (yellow card) 81'; Halilović (yellow card) 83'	Stadium: La Rosaleda; Attendance: 19680; Referee: Ricardo de Burgos Bengoetxea

19 March 2016 30	Real Sporting	2–1	Atlético Madrid	Gijón
16:00	Sanabria (yellow card) 37', (goal) 79'; Álvarez (yellow card) 65'; Pérez (yellow card) 67'; Cases (yellow card) 85'; Castro 89'	Report	Griezmann 29'; Gámez (yellow card) 52'; Juanfran (yellow card) 77'	Stadium: El Molinón; Attendance: 24,622; Referee: Gil Manzano

4 April 2016 31	Levante	0–0	Real Sporting	Valencia
20:30	Feddal (red card) 90+4'; Medjani (yellow card) 42'; Verza (yellow card) 61'; Camarasa (yellow card) 73'; Lerma (yellow card) 84'	Report	Hernández (yellow card) 34'; Lora (yellow card) 47'; Cuéllar (yellow card) 78'; Ndi (yellow card) 80'	Stadium: Ciutat de València; Attendance: 9,225; Referee: Melero López

10 April 2016 32	Real Sporting	0–1	Celta	Gijón
12:00	Vranješ (yellow card) 35'; Cases (yellow card) 71'	Report	Jonny (yellow card) 19'; Orellana (yellow card) 35'; Nolito 64'; Wass (yellow card) 67'; Guidetti (yellow card) 79'; Blanco (yellow card) 85'	Stadium: El Molinón; Attendance: 23,808; Referee: Mateu Lahoz

16 April 2016 33	Las Palmas	1–1	Real Sporting	Las Palmas
18:15	Bigas 3'; Lemos (yellow card) 12'; Viera (yellow card) 67'	Report	Pérez (yellow card) 2'; Mascarell (yellow card) 35'; Jony 48' (yellow card) 50'; Meré (yellow card) 55'; López (yellow card) 79'	Stadium: Gran Canaria; Attendance: 24,989; Referee: Undiano Mallenco

20 April 2016 34	Real Sporting	2–1	Sevilla	Gijón
20:45	Krychowiak 22' (o.g.); Cuéllar (yellow card) 53'; Lora (yellow card) 81'; Isma López 90+1'	Report	Iborra 8'; Cristóforo (yellow card) 61'	Stadium: El Molinón; Attendance: 22,559; Referee: González González

23 April 2016 35	Barcelona	6–0	Real Sporting	Barcelona
20:30	Messi 12'; Luis Suárez 63', 74' (pen.), 77' (pen.), 88'; Neymar 85' (pen.)	Report	Vranješ (red card) 84'; Luis Hernández (yellow card) 71'; Halilović (yellow card) 84'	Stadium: Camp Nou; Attendance: 77,299; Referee: Clos Gómez

29 April 2016 36	Real Sporting	2–0	Eibar	Gijón
20:30	Carmona 43'; Isma López (yellow card) 67'; Jony 82'; Guerrero (yellow card) 85'	Report	Adrián (yellow card) 32'; Capa (yellow card) 70'	Stadium: El Molinón; Attendance: 25,436; Referee: Hernández Hernández

8 May 2016 37	Getafe	1–1	Real Sporting	Getafe
17:00	Vergini (yellow card) 32'; Vigaray (yellow card) 47'; Šćepović 80'; Cala (yellow card) 90+4'	Report	Cases (red card) 56'; Sergio Álvarez 50'; Lora (yellow card) 79'	Stadium: Coliseum Alfonso Pérez; Attendance: 12,772; Referee: Álvarez Izquierdo

15 May 2016 38	Real Sporting	2–0	Villarreal	Gijón
19:30	Jony 8'; Rachid (yellow card) 63'; Álvarez 79'	Report	Ruiz (yellow card) 49'; Mario (yellow card) 90'	Stadium: El Molinón; Attendance: 27,295; Referee: Undiano Mallenco

=== Copa del Rey ===
2 December 2015 Round of 32; First leg	Betis	2–0	Real Sporting	Seville
21:00	Vadillo 47'; Petros (yellow card) 64'; Vargas 90+2'	Report	Mascarell (yellow card) 59'; Sanabria (yellow card) 86'	Stadium: Benito Villamarín; Attendance: 21,036; Referee: Vicandi Garrido

16 December 2015 Round of 32; Second leg	Real Sporting	3–3 (3–5 agg.)	Betis	Gijón
20:00	Bernardo 14'; Pérez (yellow card) 26'; Halilović 47', 72' (pen.)	Report	Van Wolfswinkel 18', 83'; Torres (yellow card) 20'; Pezzella (yellow card) 46'; Molinero (yellow card) 54'; Cejudo 88'	Stadium: El Molinón; Attendance: 12,642; Referee: González González

== Statistics ==
=== Appearances and goals ===
No.	Pos	Nat	Player	Total		La Liga		Copa del Rey	
No.	Pos	Nat	Player	Apps	Goals	Apps	Goals	Apps	Goals
1	GK	(Spain) ESP	Iván Cuéllar	32	0	32+0	0	0+0	0
2	DF	(Spain) ESP	Luis Hernández	37	0	36+0	0	1+0	0
3	DF	(Spain) ESP	Álex Menéndez	23	2	11+10	2	2+0	0
4	DF	(Chile) CHI	Igor Lichnovsky	2	0	2+0	0	0+0	0
5	DF	(Colombia) COL	Bernardo	17	2	16+0	1	1+0	1
6	MF	(Spain) ESP	Sergio Álvarez	27	2	26+1	2	0+0	0
8	MF	(Spain) ESP	Álex Barrera	6	0	0+5	0	1+0	0
9	FW	(Spain) ESP	Miguel Ángel Guerrero	25	2	13+10	2	1+1	0
10	MF	(Spain) ESP	Nacho Cases	25	1	21+3	1	1+0	0
11	MF	(Spain) ESP	Alberto Lora	32	0	26+5	0	1+0	0
13	GK	(Spain) ESP	Alberto García	8	0	6+0	0	2+0	0
15	DF	(Spain) ESP	Roberto Canella	9	0	8+1	0	0+0	0
16	FW	(Spain) ESP	Carlos Castro	27	7	7+18	7	1+1	0
17	MF	(Spain) ESP	Omar Mascarell	27	0	20+5	0	1+1	0
18	FW	(Spain) ESP	Isma López	34	2	30+3	2	1+0	0
19	MF	(Spain) ESP	Carlos Carmona	20	2	16+3	2	1+0	0
20	FW	(Paraguay) PAR	Antonio Sanabria	30	11	27+2	11	0+1	0
21	DF	(Bosnia and Herzegovina) BIH	Ognjen Vranješ	11	0	10+1	0	0+0	0
22	MF	(Spain) ESP	Pablo Pérez	18	0	8+8	0	2+0	0
23	MF	(Spain) ESP	Jony	36	5	33+3	5	0+0	0
24	MF	(Algeria) ALG	Rachid Aït-Atmane	20	0	11+7	0	2+0	0
25	MF	(Croatia) CRO	Alen Halilović	37	5	24+12	3	0+1	2
27	FW	(Spain) ESP	Sergio Mendigutxia	1	0	0+1	0	0+0	0
28	DF	(Spain) ESP	Jorge Meré	25	0	23+1	0	1+0	0
33	MF	(Cameroon) CMR	Dani Ndi	15	1	10+5	1	0+0	0
Players who have left the club after the start of the season:
7	MF	(Spain) ESP	Juan Muñiz	5	0	0+4	0	1+0	0
14	MF	(Spain) ESP	Alberto Guitián	3	0	1+0	0	2+0	0
21	FW	(Spain) ESP	Hugo Fraile	4	0	1+2	0	0+1	0

- Source: Real Sporting

=== Disciplinary record ===
N	P	Nat.	Name	La Liga			Copa del Rey			Total			Notes
N	P	Nat.	Name	Yellow card	Second yellow card	Red card	Yellow card	Second yellow card	Red card	Yellow card	Second yellow card	Red card	Notes
10	MF	(Spain)	Nacho Cases	11	1	1				11	1	1	
6	MF	(Spain)	Sergio Álvarez	7	1					7	1		6 times captain
21	DF	(Bosnia and Herzegovina)	Ognjen Vranješ	7	1					7	1		One yellow card retired
5	DF	(Colombia)	Bernardo	5	1					5	1		4 times captain
2	DF	(Spain)	Luis Hernández	4	1					4	1		3 times captain
18	FW	(Spain)	Isma López	8						8			
11	MF	(Spain)	Alberto Lora	7						7			26 times captain
17	MF	(Spain)	Omar Mascarell	5			1			6			
25	MF	(Croatia)	Alen Halilović	6						6			
28	DF	(Spain)	Jorge Meré	6						6			
20	FW	(Paraguay)	Antonio Sanabria	4			1			5			
22	MF	(Spain)	Pablo Pérez	4			1			5			
1	GK	(Spain)	Iván Cuéllar	4						4			
15	DF	(Spain)	Roberto Canella	4						4			
19	MF	(Spain)	Carlos Carmona	4						4			
23	MF	(Spain)	Jony	4						4			
9	FW	(Spain)	Miguel Ángel Guerrero	2						2			
24	MF	(Algeria)	Rachid Aït-Atmane	2						2			
33	MF	(Cameroon)	Dani Ndi	2						2			
3	DF	(Spain)	Álex Menéndez	1						1			
16	FW	(Spain)	Carlos Castro	1						1			
4	DF	(Chile)	Igor Lichnovsky										
8	MF	(Spain)	Álex Barrera										
13	GK	(Spain)	Alberto García										
27	DF	(Spain)	Sergio Mendigutxia										
Players who have left the club after the start of the season:
7	MF	(Spain)	Juan Muñiz	1						1			
14	MF	(Spain)	Alberto Guitián	1						1			
21	FW	(Spain)	Hugo Fraile										

Source: Real Sporting
Ordered by (red card) , (second yellow card) and (yellow card)
(yellow card) = Number of bookings; (second yellow card) = Number of sending offs after a second yellow card; (red card) = Number of sending offs by a direct red card.

== See also ==
- 2015–16 La Liga
- 2015–16 Copa del Rey
