= Juan Muñiz (footballer, born 1992) =

Spanish footballer

Personal information
- Full name: Juan Muñiz Gallego
- Date of birth: 14 March 1992 (age 34)
- Place of birth: Gijón, Spain
- Height: 1.77 m (5 ft 10 in)
- Position: Winger

Team information
- Current team: Adelaide United
- Number: 10

Youth career
- Clarín
- 2001–2009: Sporting Gijón

Senior career*
Years	Team	Apps	(Gls)
2009–2012	Sporting Gijón B	69	(12)
2010–2016	Sporting Gijón	54	(6)
2013–2014	→ Mirandés (loan)	20	(2)
2016–2018	Gimnàstic	62	(6)
2018–2019	Lugo	21	(1)
2019–2020	Volos	28	(5)
2020–2022	Atromitos	65	(9)
2023–2025	Johor Darul Ta'zim	42	(15)
2025–	Adelaide United	25	(3)

International career
2008	Spain U17	1	(0)
2011	Spain U19	8	(1)
- * Club domestic league appearances and goals as of 23:08, 11 May 2026 (UTC)

Juan Muñiz Gallego (Spanish: [xwan muˈniθ ɡaˈʎeɣo]; born 14 March 1992) is a Spanish professional footballer who plays as a left winger for A-League club Adelaide United.

== Club career ==
Born in Gijón, Asturias, Muñiz was a product of Sporting de Gijón's prolific youth academy, Mareo. The 17-year-old made it to the reserves during the 2009–10 season, with the side playing in the Segunda División B.

Muñiz made his debut with the first team on 16 May 2010 in a 2–0 away loss against Racing de Santander, thus becoming the second youngest player ever to debut in La Liga for his hometown club, at the age of 18 years and 63 days. Shortly after being definitely promoted to the main squad, he scored his first Segunda División goal, closing the 2–3 home defeat to Real Murcia on 25 August 2012.

On 5 August 2013, Muñiz was loaned to Mirandés of the same league in a season-long deal. On 8 July 2015, after achieving promotion to the top flight with Sporting by appearing in 29 matches and scoring three times, he renewed his contract until 2018. The following January, after having been rarely used during the campaign, he cut ties with the club and moved to Gimnàstic de Tarragona shortly after.

On 13 July 2018, free agent Muñiz signed a two-year deal with Lugo also in the second tier. He was released on 14 August 2016 and, three days later, joined Volos of the Super League Greece on a two-year contract.

Muñiz remained in the country and league for 2020–21, moving to Atromitos on a three-year deal. He left after completing two and a half, however, joining Malaysia Super League side Johor Darul Ta'zim. During his tenure at the latter, he scored 25 goals, provided 32 assists and collected seven trophies, notably two national championships.

On 15 September 2025, aged 33, Muñiz agreed to a three-year contract at Adelaide United.

== Career statistics ==
As of 10 June 2017

Appearances and goals by club, season and competition
Club	Season	League			National cup		League cup		Other		Total	
Club	Season	Division	Apps	Goals	Apps	Goals	Apps	Goals	Apps	Goals	Apps	Goals
Sporting Gijón B	2009–10	Segunda División B	3	2	0	0	0	0	—		3	2
Sporting Gijón B	2010–11	Segunda División B	35	6	0	0	0	0	—		35	6
Sporting Gijón B	2011–12	Segunda División B	31	4	0	0	0	0	—		31	4
Sporting Gijón B	Total		69	12	0	0	0	0	—		69	12
Sporting Gijón	2009–10	La Liga	1	0	0	0	0	0	—		1	0
Sporting Gijón	2010–11	La Liga	1	0	1	1	0	0	—		2	1
Sporting Gijón	2011–12	La Liga	1	0	1	1	0	0	—		2	1
Sporting Gijón	2012–13	Segunda División	18	3	4	0	0	0	—		22	3
Sporting Gijón	2014–15	Segunda División	29	3	1	0	0	0	—		30	3
Sporting Gijón	2015–16	La Liga	4	0	1	0	0	0	—		5	0
Sporting Gijón	Total		54	6	8	2	0	0	—		62	8
Mirandés (loan)	2013–14	Segunda División	20	2	1	1	0	0	—		21	3
Mirandés (loan)	Total		20	2	1	1	0	0	—		21	3
Gimnàstic	2015–16	Segunda División	13	0	0	0	0	0	2 (Note: Appearances in La Liga play-offs)	1	15	1
Gimnàstic	2016–17	Segunda División	24	4	3	0	0	0	0	0	27	4
Gimnàstic	Total		37	4	3	0	0	0	2	1	42	5
Career total			180	24	12	3	0	0	2	1	194	28

== Honours ==
Johor Darul Ta'zim

- Malaysia Super League: 2023, 2024–25
- Malaysia FA Cup: 2023, 2024
- Malaysia Cup: 2023, 2024–25
- Piala Sumbangsih: 2023

Spain U19

- UEFA European Under-19 Championship: 2011
