= Óscar Trejo =

Argentine footballer (born 1988)

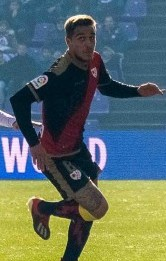
- Trejo with Rayo Vallecano in 2019

Personal information
- Full name: Óscar Guido Trejo
- Date of birth: 26 April 1988 (age 38)
- Place of birth: Santiago del Estero, Argentina
- Height: 1.80 m (5 ft 11 in)
- Positions: Attacking midfielder; forward

Youth career
- Estrella Roja
- 2004–2006: Boca Juniors

Senior career*
| Years | Team | Apps | (Gls) |
| 2005 | Boca Juniors | 1 | (1) |
| 2007–2011 | Mallorca | 36 | (3) |
| 2009–2010 | → Elche (loan) | 34 | (4) |
| 2010–2011 | → Rayo Vallecano (loan) | 40 | (9) |
| 2011–2013 | Sporting Gijón | 71 | (9) |
| 2013–2017 | Toulouse | 126 | (12) |
| 2017–2026 | Rayo Vallecano | 260 | (29) |
| Total | | 569 | (67) |
- * Club domestic league appearances and goals

Óscar Guido Trejo (born 26 April 1988) is an Argentine former professional footballer who played as an attacking midfielder or forward.

After starting out at Boca Juniors, he went on to spend the majority of his career with Rayo Vallecano in Spain, making 334 appearances in all competitions.

== Club career ==
Trejo was born in Santiago del Estero. A product of Boca Juniors' youth system, he only played once for its first team but, in the game against Club Almagro, he scored in a 3–2 away loss after a mere minutes on the pitch – the match was suspended after 63 minutes.

In late December 2006, Trejo was bought by RCD Mallorca in Spain, still having not signed his first professional contract; Boca sustained otherwise and the case was taken to FIFA, which ultimately decided for the Balearic Islands club. He made his first appearance in La Liga on 8 April 2007, against Getafe CF: having come on as a 90th-minute substitute, he managed to find the net for a final 2–0 home victory.

Sparingly used over the following seasons, Trejo managed to score in the 2007–08 edition of the Copa del Rey in a 2–1 home win over Real Madrid (3–1 aggregate). After an unassuming 2008–09, he was loaned the following campaign to Segunda División side Elche CF.

On 15 August 2010, a similar move ensued, with Trejo joining Rayo Vallecano in the same tier. He returned to the top flight in the 2011–12 season, scoring four goals from 33 appearances for Sporting de Gijón but suffering relegation.

In the summer of 2012, Premier League's West Ham United made an attempt to buy Trejo, but the deal fell apart. He left Spain one year later, going on to spend several seasons in the French Ligue 1 with Toulouse FC after agreeing to a four-year contract.

Trejo returned to Rayo on 21 June 2017 as director of football David Cobeño's first signing, six years after leaving. He scored a career-high 12 goals in his first year, combining with Raúl de Tomás for 36 as the team returned to the top division as champions.

Trejo continued to feature regularly for Rayo Vallecano in the following years, and became the sixth-highest appearance maker for the club in December 2024, at 303. On 8 July 2025, after helping them to qualify for the UEFA Conference League, their first European competition in more than 20 years, the 37-year-old renewed his contract for another season.

On 17 May 2026, Trejo played his last home match for Rayo in a 2–0 defeat of Villarreal CF, receiving an emotional farewell from the crowd after being substituted in the second half. In June, he announced his retirement.

== Career statistics ==
As of match played 17 May 2026

Appearances and goals by club, season and competition
| Club | Season | League | | | National cup | | League cup | | Europe | | Other | | Total | |
| Club | Season | Division | Apps | Goals | Apps | Goals | Apps | Goals | Apps | Goals | Apps | Goals | Apps | Goals |
|---|---|---|---|---|---|---|---|---|---|---|---|---|---|---|
| Boca Juniors | 2004–05 | Primera División | 1 | 1 | 0 | 0 | — | | — | | — | | 1 | 1 |
| Mallorca | 2006–07 | La Liga | 8 | 1 | 0 | 0 | — | | — | | — | | 8 | 1 |
| Mallorca | 2007–08 | La Liga | 17 | 2 | 6 | 1 | — | | — | | — | | 23 | 3 |
| Mallorca | 2008–09 | La Liga | 11 | 0 | 5 | 0 | — | | — | | — | | 16 | 0 |
| Mallorca | Total | | 36 | 3 | 11 | 1 | — | | — | | — | | 47 | 4 |
| Elche (loan) | 2009–10 | Segunda División | 34 | 4 | 1 | 0 | — | | — | | — | | 35 | 4 |
| Rayo Vallecano (loan) | 2010–11 | Segunda División | 40 | 9 | 1 | 1 | — | | — | | — | | 41 | 10 |
| Sporting Gijón | 2011–12 | La Liga | 33 | 4 | 0 | 0 | — | | — | | — | | 33 | 4 |
| Sporting Gijón | 2012–13 | Segunda División | 38 | 5 | 4 | 1 | — | | — | | — | | 42 | 6 |
| Sporting Gijón | Total | | 71 | 9 | 4 | 1 | — | | — | | — | | 75 | 10 |
| Toulouse | 2013–14 | Ligue 1 | 32 | 2 | 2 | 0 | 1 | 1 | — | | — | | 35 | 3 |
| Toulouse | 2014–15 | Ligue 1 | 31 | 4 | 1 | 0 | 0 | 0 | — | | — | | 32 | 4 |
| Toulouse | 2015–16 | Ligue 1 | 34 | 4 | 1 | 1 | 3 | 0 | — | | — | | 38 | 5 |
| Toulouse | 2016–17 | Ligue 1 | 29 | 2 | 1 | 0 | 1 | 0 | — | | — | | 31 | 2 |
| Toulouse | Total | | 126 | 12 | 5 | 1 | 5 | 1 | — | | — | | 136 | 14 |
| Toulouse B | 2014–15 | CFA 2 | 1 | 0 | — | | — | | — | | — | | 1 | 0 |
| Rayo Vallecano | 2017–18 | Segunda División | 36 | 12 | 0 | 0 | — | | — | | — | | 36 | 12 |
| Rayo Vallecano | 2018–19 | La Liga | 26 | 1 | 1 | 0 | — | | — | | — | | 27 | 1 |
| Rayo Vallecano | 2019–20 | Segunda División | 37 | 5 | 2 | 0 | — | | — | | — | | 39 | 5 |
| Rayo Vallecano | 2020–21 | Segunda División | 38 | 4 | 3 | 0 | — | | — | | 4 (Note: Appearances in La Liga play-offs) | 1 | 45 | 5 |
| Rayo Vallecano | 2021–22 | La Liga | 32 | 3 | 6 | 1 | — | | — | | — | | 38 | 4 |
| Rayo Vallecano | 2022–23 | La Liga | 34 | 3 | 3 | 0 | — | | — | | — | | 37 | 3 |
| Rayo Vallecano | 2023–24 | La Liga | 31 | 0 | 1 | 0 | — | | — | | — | | 32 | 0 |
| Rayo Vallecano | 2024–25 | La Liga | 19 | 1 | 4 | 3 | — | | — | | — | | 23 | 4 |
| Rayo Vallecano | 2025–26 | La Liga | 7 | 0 | 3 | 1 | — | | 6 (Note: Appearances in UEFA Conference League) | 0 | — | | 16 | 1 |
| Rayo Vallecano | Total | | 260 | 29 | 23 | 5 | 0 | 0 | 6 | 0 | 4 | 1 | 293 | 35 |
| Career total | | | 569 | 67 | 45 | 9 | 5 | 1 | 6 | 0 | 4 | 1 | 629 | 78 |

== Honours ==
Rayo Vallecano

- Segunda División: 2017–18
- UEFA Conference League runner-up: 2025–26
