= Iván Cuéllar =

Spanish footballer (born 1984)

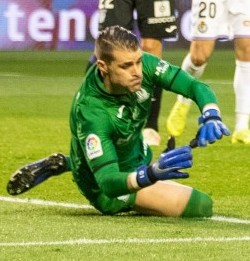
- Cuéllar with Leganés in 2018

Personal information
- Full name: Iván Cuéllar Sacristán
- Date of birth: 27 May 1984 (age 42)
- Place of birth: Mérida, Spain
- Height: 1.87 m (6 ft 2 in)
- Position: Goalkeeper

Team information
- Current team: Mallorca
- Number: 25

Youth career
- Real Madrid
- 2001–2002: Mérida
- 2002–2003: Atlético Madrid

Senior career*
| Years | Team | Apps | (Gls) |
| 2002 | Mérida | 1 | (0) |
| 2003–2005 | Atlético Madrid B | 17 | (0) |
| 2005–2008 | Atlético Madrid | 8 | (0) |
| 2007–2008 | → Eibar (loan) | 38 | (0) |
| 2008–2017 | Sporting Gijón | 199 | (0) |
| 2017–2021 | Leganés | 123 | (0) |
| 2021–2023 | Sporting Gijón | 35 | (0) |
| 2023– | Mallorca | 1 | (0) |

International career
| 2006 | Spain U21 | 4 | (0) |
| 2005 | Spain U23 | 3 | (0) |
- * Club domestic league appearances and goals as of 17:44, 26 May 2024 (UTC)

Iván Cuéllar Sacristán (born 27 May 1984), nicknamed Pichu, is a Spanish professional footballer who plays as a goalkeeper for Segunda División club Mallorca.

Developed at Atlético Madrid, he spent most of his career with Sporting de Gijón, where he made 247 total appearances.

== Club career ==
=== Atlético Madrid ===
Cuéllar was born in Mérida, Extremadura, and earned his nickname "Pichu" – local dialect for a young boy – from a cousin. He spent time at Real Madrid before continuing his development at hometown club Mérida UD, where he made his senior debut aged 17 in a 1–0 loss away to Granada CF in Segunda División B. After completing his youth career at Atlético Madrid, he made his first appearance for the first team in the last matchday of the 2004–05 season, in a 2–2 draw against neighbours Getafe CF.

In 2006–07, benefitting from the forced absence of starter Leo Franco, Cuéllar played a further seven games, including a 0–6 home defeat to FC Barcelona on 20 May 2007.

=== Sporting Gijón ===
After a season-long loan at Segunda División club SD Eibar, featuring in all the matches save four, Cuéllar was released by Atlético (as another youth graduate in the same position, Ismael Falcón) and joined Sporting de Gijón in August 2008, on a four-year contract. After Sergio Sánchez conceded 19 goals in the season's first four games he became the starter but, following a collision with Athletic Bilbao's Carlos Gurpegui during a 3–0 away defeat on 14 December, suffered a serious ankle injury which rendered him unavailable for four months.

In mid-November 2009, as he was second choice to Juan Pablo, Cuéllar suffered another severe injury, damaging his knee in training and being lost for the vast majority of the campaign. His first appearance after recovering would take place on 22 September 2010, as manager Manuel Preciado rested the vast majority of the starters for a Wednesday match at Barcelona – in a week where all the teams played three matches – which ended in a 1–0 loss.

In January 2013, after the departure of Juan Pablo to Maccabi Tel Aviv FC, Cuéllar became the starter. He won the Ricardo Zamora Trophy for best goalkeeper in 2014–15, conceding 21 goals in 36 appearances as the Asturians returned to La Liga. At the end of the season, he extended his contract until 2018.

=== Leganés ===
Cuéllar ended his nine-year association with the El Molinón-based team in July 2017, and the 33-year-old signed for CD Leganés also in the top tier. As Jon Ander Serantes was nursing a serious injury, he took the number one position and went on to record a club and personal best clean sheet of over 500 minutes that was broken by Sevilla FC in October.

=== Return to Sporting ===
On 29 August 2021, Cuéllar returned to Sporting on a two-year contract. He was second-choice to Diego Mariño and did not play until 20 March when he profited from the latter's injury to play in a 1–1 draw at Leganés; he then had a run of ten consecutive games in which he kept only two clean sheets but never conceded more than once, as the team narrowly avoided relegation.

=== Mallorca ===
On 28 August 2023, Cuéllar signed a one-year deal with top-tier RCD Mallorca, in order to provide competition for Dominik Greif and Predrag Rajković.

== Career statistics ==
As of match played 2 December 2025

Appearances and goals by club, season and competition
| Club | Season | League | | | National cup | | Other | | Total | |
| Club | Season | Division | Apps | Goals | Apps | Goals | Apps | Goals | Apps | Goals |
|---|---|---|---|---|---|---|---|---|---|---|
| Mérida | 2001–02 | Segunda División B | 1 | 0 | — | | — | | 1 | 0 |
| Atlético Madrid B | 2003–04 | Segunda División B | 2 | 0 | — | | — | | 2 | 0 |
| Atlético Madrid B | 2004–05 | Segunda División | 15 | 0 | — | | — | | 15 | 0 |
| Atlético Madrid B | Total | | 17 | 0 | — | | — | | 17 | 0 |
| Atlético Madrid | 2002–03 | La Liga | 0 | 0 | 0 | 0 | — | | 0 | 0 |
| Atlético Madrid | 2003–04 | La Liga | 0 | 0 | 0 | 0 | — | | 0 | 0 |
| Atlético Madrid | 2004–05 | La Liga | 1 | 0 | 0 | 0 | — | | 1 | 0 |
| Atlético Madrid | 2005–06 | La Liga | 0 | 0 | 0 | 0 | — | | 0 | 0 |
| Atlético Madrid | 2006–07 | La Liga | 7 | 0 | 2 | 0 | — | | 9 | 0 |
| Atlético Madrid | Total | | 8 | 0 | 2 | 0 | — | | 10 | 0 |
| Eibar (loan) | 2007–08 | Segunda División | 38 | 0 | 0 | 0 | — | | 38 | 0 |
| Sporting Gijón | 2008–09 | La Liga | 18 | 0 | 0 | 0 | — | | 18 | 0 |
| Sporting Gijón | 2009–10 | La Liga | 0 | 0 | 2 | 0 | — | | 2 | 0 |
| Sporting Gijón | 2010–11 | La Liga | 13 | 0 | 2 | 0 | — | | 15 | 0 |
| Sporting Gijón | 2011–12 | La Liga | 1 | 0 | 2 | 0 | — | | 3 | 0 |
| Sporting Gijón | 2012–13 | Segunda División | 23 | 0 | 4 | 0 | — | | 27 | 0 |
| Sporting Gijón | 2013–14 | Segunda División | 40 | 0 | 0 | 0 | 2 (Note: Appearances in La Liga play-offs) | 0 | 42 | 0 |
| Sporting Gijón | 2014–15 | Segunda División | 36 | 0 | 0 | 0 | — | | 36 | 0 |
| Sporting Gijón | 2015–16 | La Liga | 32 | 0 | 0 | 0 | — | | 32 | 0 |
| Sporting Gijón | 2016–17 | La Liga | 36 | 0 | 0 | 0 | — | | 36 | 0 |
| Sporting Gijón | Total | | 199 | 0 | 10 | 0 | 2 | 0 | 211 | 0 |
| Leganés | 2017–18 | La Liga | 35 | 0 | 0 | 0 | — | | 35 | 0 |
| Leganés | 2018–19 | La Liga | 34 | 0 | 2 | 0 | — | | 36 | 0 |
| Leganés | 2019–20 | La Liga | 27 | 0 | 1 | 0 | — | | 28 | 0 |
| Leganés | 2020–21 | Segunda División | 27 | 0 | 0 | 0 | 0 | 0 | 27 | 0 |
| Leganés | Total | | 123 | 0 | 3 | 0 | 0 | 0 | 126 | 0 |
| Sporting Gijón | 2021–22 | Segunda División | 10 | 0 | 0 | 0 | — | | 10 | 0 |
| Sporting Gijón | 2022–23 | Segunda División | 25 | 0 | 1 | 0 | — | | 26 | 0 |
| Sporting Gijón | Total | | 35 | 0 | 1 | 0 | — | | 36 | 0 |
| Mallorca | 2023–24 | La Liga | 1 | 0 | 1 | 0 | — | | 2 | 0 |
| Mallorca | 2024–25 | La Liga | 0 | 0 | 0 | 0 | — | | 0 | 0 |
| Mallorca | 2025–26 | La Liga | 0 | 0 | 1 | 0 | — | | 1 | 0 |
| Mallorca | Total | | 1 | 0 | 2 | 0 | — | | 3 | 0 |
| Career total | | | 422 | 0 | 18 | 0 | 2 | 0 | 442 | 0 |

== Honours ==
Spain U23

- Mediterranean Games: 2005

Individual

- Segunda División: Ricardo Zamora Trophy/Best Goalkeeper 2014–15
