= Guille Méndez =

Spanish footballer

Personal information
- Full name: Guillermo Méndez Pereiro
- Date of birth: 31 January 1992 (age 34)
- Place of birth: San Esteban, Spain
- Height: 1.77 m (5 ft 9 1/2 in)
- Position: Forward

Team information
- Current team: Puerto de Vega CF

Youth career
- Soto del Barco
- Avilés
- Sporting Gijón

Senior career*
Years	Team	Apps	(Gls)
2010–2012	Sporting B	36	(3)
2010	Sporting Gijón	1	(0)
2012	→ Marino (loan)	14	(1)
2012–2013	Racing Santander B	14	(0)
2013–2014	Praviano	33	(13)
2014	Avilés B	15	(3)
2014	Avilés	1	(0)
2015–2016	Langreo	47	(12)
2016–2022	Praviano	9	(6)

International career
2008	Spain U17	1	(0)
- * Club domestic league appearances and goals as of 21 May 2017

Guillermo "Guille" Méndez Pereiro (born 31 January 1992) is a Spanish footballer who plays for CD Praviano as a forward.

== Club career ==
Méndez was born in San Esteban de Pravia, Asturias. A product of Sporting de Gijón's prolific youth academy, Mareo, he made it to the B-team during the 2010–11 season at the age of 18, with the side playing in the third division.

Méndez made his first-team – and La Liga – debut on 21 November 2010, entering the pitch in the 81st minute of a 0–1 away loss against CA Osasuna. In the following months, he continued to appear exclusively for the reserves.

In January 2012, Méndez moved to neighbouring Marino de Luanco (third level), on loan until end of the campaign.
