= Alain Álvarez =

Spanish footballer

Personal information
- Full name: Alain Álvarez Menéndez
- Date of birth: 13 November 1989 (age 36)
- Place of birth: Gijón, Spain
- Height: 1.84 m (6 ft 0 in)
- Position: Centre back

Youth career
- Veriña
- 2004–2006: Sporting Gijón

Senior career*
Years	Team	Apps	(Gls)
2006–2014	Sporting B	199	(1)
2014–2015	Othellos Athienou	22	(0)
2015–2016	Racing Santander	15	(0)
2016–2017	Aris Limassol	29	(0)
2017–2018	Leioa	28	(0)
2018–2025	Langreo	141	(2)

International career
2007	Spain U19	3	(0)
- * Club domestic league appearances and goals as of 15 June 2025

Alain Álvarez Menéndez (born 13 November 1989) is a Spanish professional footballer who plays as a central defender.

== Club career ==
Born in Gijón, Asturias, Álvarez joined Sporting de Gijón's youth setup in 2004, aged 14, after starting out at Veriña CF. He made his senior debut with the reserves in 2006, in Tercera División.

In the summer of 2009, Álvarez was called up by manager Manolo Preciado for the pre-season with the main squad. However, he continued to be exclusively associated to the B-team in competitive games.

On 18 July 2014, Álvarez moved abroad for the first time in his career, joining Cypriot First Division side Othellos Athienou FC. He played his first match as a professional on 30 August, starting in a 0–1 home loss against Nea Salamis Famagusta FC.

Álvarez returned to his native country on 8 July 2015, signing a two-year deal with Racing de Santander. He moved back to Cyprus the following off-season, with Aris Limassol FC.
