= Raúl Domínguez (footballer) =

Spanish footballer (born 1986)

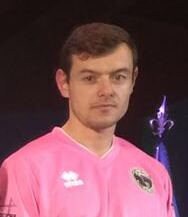

Personal information
- Full name: Raúl Domínguez Carral
- Date of birth: 1 November 1986 (age 40)
- Place of birth: Santa María de Cayón, Spain
- Height: 1.81 m (5 ft 11 in)
- Position: Goalkeeper

Youth career
- 1997–2005: Cultural Guarnizo

Senior career*
Years	Team	Apps	(Gls)
2005–2008	Cultural Guarnizo		
2008–2011	Sporting Gijón B	62	(0)
2011–2013	Sporting Gijón	2	(0)
2014–2016	Sestao	76	(0)
2016–2018	Racing Santander	3	(0)
2019–2023	Cayón	60	(0)
Total		203	(0)
- * Club domestic league appearances and goals

Raúl Domínguez Carral (born 1 November 1986) is a Spanish former footballer who played as a goalkeeper.

== Club career ==
Born in Santa María de Cayón, Cantabria, Domínguez started playing football with amateurs CD Guarnizo. In 2008, he moved to Asturias and joined Sporting de Gijón, first being assigned to the reserve side in the Segunda División B.

Domínguez made his first-team (and La Liga) debut on 21 May 2011, starting in a 0–0 away draw against Hércules CF with Sporting already safe from relegation and their opponents condemned.

== Career statistics ==
Appearances and goals by club, season and competition
Club	Season	League			National cup		Other		Total	
Club	Season	Division	Apps	Goals	Apps	Goals	Apps	Goals	Apps	Goals
Sporting Gijón B	2008–09	Segunda División B	18	0	—		1	0	19	0
Sporting Gijón B	2009–10	Segunda División B	2	0	—		—		2	0
Sporting Gijón B	2010–11	Segunda División B	20	0	—		—		20	0
Sporting Gijón B	2011–12	Segunda División B	22	0	—		—		22	0
Sporting Gijón B	Total		62	0	—		1	0	63	0
Sporting Gijón	2009–10	La Liga	0	0	0	0	—		0	0
Sporting Gijón	2010–11	La Liga	1	0	—		—		1	0
Sporting Gijón	2012–13	Segunda División	1	0	0	0	—		1	0
Sporting Gijón	Total		2	0	0	0	—		2	0
Sestao	2013–14	Segunda División B	8	0	—		4	0	12	0
Sestao	2014–15	Segunda División B	34	0	1	0	—		35	0
Sestao	2015–16	Segunda División B	34	0	—		—		34	0
Sestao	Total		76	0	1	0	4	0	81	0
Racing Santander	2016–17	Segunda División B	2	0	4	0	0	0	6	0
Racing Santander	2017–18	Segunda División B	1	0	1	0	—		2	0
Racing Santander	Total		3	0	5	0	0	0	8	0
Cayón	2019–20	Tercera División	28	0	—		—		6	0
Cayón	2020–21	Tercera División	19	0	—		4	0	23	0
Cayón	2021–22	Segunda División RFEF	1	0	0	0	—		1	0
Cayón	2022–23	Tercera Federación	12	0	2	0	—		14	0
Cayón	Total		60	0	2	0	4	0	66	0
Career total			203	0	8	0	9	0	220	0
