= Alberto Botía =

Spanish footballer (born 1989)

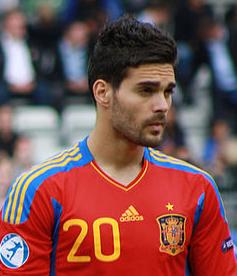
- Botía with Spain U21 in 2011

Personal information
- Full name: Alberto Tomás Botía Rabasco
- Date of birth: 27 January 1989 (age 37)
- Place of birth: Alquerías, Spain
- Height: 1.89 m (6 ft 2 in)
- Position: Centre-back

Youth career
- 1997–2000: Beniel
- 2000–2003: Murcia
- 2003–2006: Barcelona

Senior career*
Years	Team	Apps	(Gls)
2006–2009	Barcelona B	59	(3)
2009–2010	Barcelona	1	(0)
2009–2010	→ Sporting Gijón (loan)	26	(0)
2010–2012	Sporting Gijón	62	(2)
2012–2014	Sevilla	18	(1)
2013–2014	→ Elche (loan)	33	(0)
2014–2018	Olympiacos	67	(8)
2018–2019	Al Hilal	26	(2)
2019–2023	Al Wehda	69	(3)
2023–2026	A.E. Kifisia	46	(1)
Total		407	(20)

International career
2009	Spain U20	8	(1)
2009–2011	Spain U21	17	(0)
2012	Spain U23	4	(0)
- * Club domestic league appearances and goals

Alberto Botía (Spanish pronunciation: [alˈβeɾto βoˈti.a]; born 27 January 1989) is a Spanish former professional footballer who played as a centre-back.

He made 140 La Liga appearances, mostly for Sporting de Gijón but also Sevilla, Elche and one for Barcelona, where he started his career. Additionally, he spent four years with Olympiacos, winning the Super League Greece three times.

Botía won the 2011 European Under-21 Championship with Spain.

== Club career ==
=== Barcelona ===
Botía was born in Alquerías, Region of Murcia. Aged just eight years old he began playing for Beniel, soon joining neighbours Real Murcia and remaining there for three years. In 2003 he moved to Barcelona, being inserted into its B team after a further three seasons.

In late May 2009 Botía, alongside fellow youth graduate Marc Muniesa, was first called to the main squad for a UEFA Champions League match against Manchester United. He made his official debut on the 30th, coming on as a second-half substitute for Gerard Piqué in the final game of the campaign, a 1–1 away draw against Deportivo de La Coruña.

=== Sporting Gijón ===
On 14 July 2009, Botía was sent to fellow La Liga club Sporting de Gijón on a season-long loan. A regular starter throughout his first year in the top tier, he decided to extend his stay with the Asturians in a four-year deal, with Barcelona keeping a buy-back clause for the first three.

Botía scored his first top-flight goal on 12 September 2010, opening a 2–0 home win over Mallorca. On 14 November, he was sent off in the last minute of a 1–0 loss to Real Madrid also at El Molinón for a foul on Cristiano Ronaldo.

=== Sevilla ===
On 8 August 2012, following Sporting's relegation, Botía signed with Sevilla for a fee believed to be in the region of €3 million. He was brought in with the help of the Doyen Group, an Anglo-Portuguese investment firm. He made his official debut for his new team 18 days later, playing the second half of a 1–1 away draw against Granada.

On 23 February 2013, Botía put the visitors ahead at former side Barcelona, but in an eventual 2–1 loss. For the 2013–14 campaign, after 25 official appearances for the Andalusian team, he was loaned to Elche alongside teammates Manu del Moral and Miroslav Stevanović.

Botía's spell at the Estadio Martínez Valero ended prematurely on 3 May 2014, when he was ejected for kicking the ball at a Málaga player in a 0–1 home defeat and then confronted the referee, earning him a two-match suspension.

=== Olympiacos ===
On 1 August 2014, Botía joined Greek club Olympiacos on a four-year contract, for €2 million. He contributed 26 appearances in all competitions in his debut season, helping them to win the double.

Botía was also regularly played in 2015–16, under new manager Marco Silva. On 25 October 2015, he scored both of his team's goals in a 2–1 away victory over Atromitos, becoming the club's first defender to achieve this since Avraam Papadopoulos two years earlier.

On 6 November 2016, Botía netted the opening goal of a 3–0 home defeat of Panathinaikos in the derby of the eternal enemies. His contract was terminated by mutual consent on 4 May 2018.

=== Saudi Arabia ===
Botía became new manager Jorge Jesus' first signing for Al Hilal on 26 June 2018, when the 29-year-old agreed to a two-year deal with the option for a further season. On his debut on 18 August, the club won the Saudi Super Cup with a 2–1 win over Al Ittihad at Loftus Road, London.

After the Riyadh-based side finished runners-up to Al Nassr, Botía left for Al Wehda also of the Saudi Pro League. He scored the equaliser on his debut, a 2–1 home loss to Abha on 30 August.

=== Return to Greece ===
In July 2023, aged 34, Botía returned to the Greek top division with A.E. Kifisia. He retired at the end of the 2025–26 campaign, being immediately appointed their director of football.

== International career ==
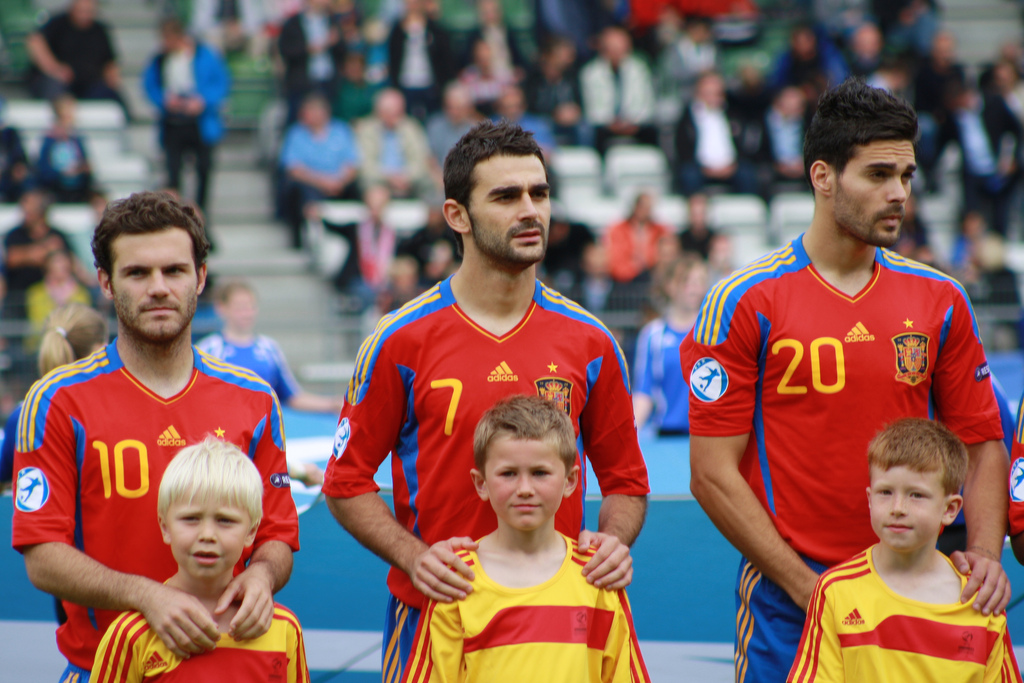
Juan Mata (left), Adrián López (centre) and Botía, lining up for the Spanish under-21s.

On 7 February 2007, Botía was summoned for the Spain under-19 team, being an unused squad member at the "XXXIII International Atlantic Cup". Almost exactly two years later he received his first under-21 callup, for a friendly with Norway.

On 25 August 2011, Botía was selected for the first time to the full side by manager Vicente del Bosque, for games against Chile and Liechtenstein. He was included in Luis Milla's squad for the 2012 Summer Olympics, playing the last two matches against Honduras and Morocco as the team were eliminated without scoring a goal.

== Personal life ==
In 2017, Botía began a relationship with Eleni Foureira, an Albanian-born Greek singer who represented Cyprus at the 2018 Eurovision Song Contest. Their son was born in 2023.

== Career statistics ==
Appearances and goals by club, season and competition
Club	Season	League			National cup (Note: Includes Copa del Rey, Greek Football Cup, King's Cup)		Continental		Other		Total	
Club	Season	Division	Apps	Goals	Apps	Goals	Apps	Goals	Apps	Goals	Apps	Goals
Barcelona B	2006–07	Segunda División B	15	0	–		–		–		15	0
Barcelona B	2007–08	Tercera División	17	1	–		–		–		17	1
Barcelona B	2008–09	Segunda División B	27	2	–		–		–		27	2
Barcelona B	Total		59	3	–		–		–		59	3
Barcelona	2008–09	La Liga	1	0	0	0	0	0	–		1	0
Sporting Gijón	2009–10	La Liga	26	0	1	0	–		–		27	0
Sporting Gijón	2010–11	La Liga	28	1	1	0	–		–		29	1
Sporting Gijón	2011–12	La Liga	34	1	2	0	–		–		36	1
Sporting Gijón	Total		88	2	4	0	–		–		92	2
Sevilla	2012–13	La Liga	18	1	7	1	–		–		25	2
Elche	2013–14	La Liga	33	0	2	0	–		–		35	0
Olympiacos	2014–15	Super League Greece	17	1	3	0	6 (Note: Appearances in UEFA Champions League)	1	–		26	2
Olympiacos	2015–16	Super League Greece	17	4	5	0	5 (Note: Three appearances in UEFA Champions League, two appearances in UEFA Europa League)	0	–		27	4
Olympiacos	2016–17	Super League Greece	20	2	4	0	12 (Note: Two appearances in UEFA Champions League, ten appearances in UEFA Europa League)	0	–		36	2
Olympiacos	2017–18	Super League Greece	13	1	2	1	3	0	–		18	2
Olympiacos	Total		67	8	14	1	26	1	–		107	10
Al Hilal	2018–19	Saudi Pro League	26	2	2	0	–		6 (Note: One appearance in Saudi Super Cup, five appearances in Arab Club Champions Cup)	0	34	2
Al Wehda	2019–20	Saudi Pro League	24	1	1	0	–		–		25	1
Al Wehda	2020–21	Saudi Pro League	19	0	1	0	0	0	–		20	0
Al Wehda	2021–22	Saudi First Division League	19	1			–		–		19	1
Al Wehda	2022–23	Saudi Pro League	7	1	0	0	–		–		7	1
Al Wehda	Total		69	3	2	0	0	0	–		71	3
A.E. Kifisia	2023–24	Super League Greece	13	1	1	0	–		–		14	1
A.E. Kifisia	2024–25	Super League Greece 2	19	0	1	0	–		1 (Note: Appearance in Super League Greece 2 Supercup)	0	21	0
A.E. Kifisia	2025–26	Super League Greece	14	0	3	0	–		–		17	0
A.E. Kifisia	Total		46	1	5	0	–		1	0	52	1
Career total			407	20	36	2	26	1	7	0	476	23

== Honours ==
Barcelona

- La Liga: 2008–09

Olympiacos

- Super League Greece: 2014–15, 2015–16, 2016–17
- Greek Football Cup: 2014–15; runner-up: 2015–16

Al-Hilal

- Saudi Super Cup: 2018

Spain U20

- Mediterranean Games: 2009

Spain U21

- UEFA European Under-21 Championship: 2011
