= Javi Poves =

Spanish footballer

Personal information
- Full name: Javier Poves Gómez
- Date of birth: 28 September 1986 (age 40)
- Place of birth: Madrid, Spain
- Height: 1.84 m (6 ft 0 in)
- Position: Defender

Youth career
- Atlético Madrid
- Rayo Vallecano

Senior career*
Years	Team	Apps	(Gls)
2005–2006	Rayo Vallecano B		
2006–2007	Las Rozas		
2007–2008	Navalcarnero		
2008–2010	Sporting Gijón B	63	(2)
2010–2011	Sporting Gijón	1	(0)
2014–2015	S.S. Reyes	1	(0)
2016–2019	Móstoles		
- * Club domestic league appearances and goals

Javier "Javi" Poves Gómez (born 28 September 1986) is a Spanish former professional footballer who played as a defender.

He quit as a professional after one substitute appearance in La Liga for Sporting de Gijón, citing reasons of conscience. In 2019 he became president of Móstoles, renaming the club Flat Earth FC and endorsing the idea of a flat Earth.

== Playing career ==
Born in Madrid, Poves played youth football with hometown clubs Atlético Madrid and Rayo Vallecano, going on to make his senior debut in amateur football also in the community, with Rayo Vallecano B, Las Rozas CF and CDA Navalcarnero. In 2008 he joined Sporting de Gijón, being assigned to the reserves in the Segunda División B.

Poves made his first and only appearance for the Asturians' first team on 21 May 2011, playing in the goalless La Liga draw at Hércules CF on the final day of the season as a second-half substitute for David Barral. He refused to use a bank account and returned a free car which Sporting had given to each of their players, and retired in August 2011 for reasons of conscience, stating:

What I've seen from within makes it clear: professional football is only money and corruption. It's capitalism, and capitalism is death. I don't want to be part of a system based on people earning money at the expense of the deaths of others in South America, Africa and Asia. To put it simply, my conscience will not let me continue with this.

== Flat Earth ==
Poves made a return to football on 12 July 2014, signing with Madrid-based UD San Sebastián de los Reyes of Tercera División. Two years later he joined Móstoles Balompié, where he became president and received international attention for renaming the club Flat Earth FC before their debut season in the fourth tier in 2019; he publicly endorsed the theory of a Flat Earth.

Wishing to break precedents and bring different perspectives to his club, Poves hired former Spain international Laura del Río as Flat Earth's manager in August 2019; she became the first woman to lead a men's team in the country. After two wins were followed by seven games without a victory, she was dismissed on 29 October and replaced by predecessor Javier de Lucas.

During the COVID-19 pandemic, Poves and his club uploaded social media posts against vaccines and face masks. He announced that he was leaving on 6 December 2020, but two days later said that his words were misinterpreted; he released a long statement including "Perhaps, bearing the burden of being the only club in the world that strives for the liberation of mankind from this enslaving system to which we submit, is on occasion an extra emotional burden that I have to learn to manage".

In July 2021, Flat Earth was acquired by CF Fuenlabrada, being renamed CF Fuenlabrada Promesas Madrid 2021.
