= Marcos Landeira =

Spanish footballer

Personal information
- Full name: Marcos Landeira Álvarez
- Date of birth: 2 May 1987 (age 39)
- Place of birth: Gijón, Spain
- Height: 1.82 m (5 ft 11 1/2 in)
- Position: Defensive midfielder

Youth career
- Xeitosa
- Sporting Gijón

Senior career*
| Years | Team | Apps | (Gls) |
| 2005–2012 | Sporting Gijón B | 62 | (1) |
| 2005–2013 | Sporting Gijón | 24 | (0) |
| 2008–2009 | → Melilla (loan) | 23 | (2) |
| 2011 | → Real Unión (loan) | 14 | (0) |
| 2013–2014 | Caudal | 11 | (1) |
| 2014 | Cudillero | 7 | (0) |
| Total | | 141 | (4) |
- * Club domestic league appearances and goals

Marcos Landeira Álvarez (born 2 May 1987) is a Spanish former footballer who played as a defensive midfielder.

== Club career ==
Landeira was born in Gijón, Asturias. A product of Sporting de Gijón's youth ranks, he made 17 Segunda División appearances with the first team over the course of three seasons. That total included three in 2007–08, as the club returned to La Liga after ten years.

In the following campaign, Landeira was loaned to Segunda División B side UD Melilla, returning to Sporting's reserves – also in that tier – in May 2009. He made his top-flight debut on 17 April 2010, starting in a 0–3 away loss against Sevilla FC. It would be his only appearance of the season, as they once again managed to avoid relegation.

Landeira spent the second half of 2010–11 on loan at Real Unión, in division three. He subsequently returned to Sporting, continuing to appear almost exclusively with the B team.
