= Gastón Sangoy =

Argentine footballer (born 1984)

Personal information
- Full name: Gastón Maximiliano Sangoy
- Date of birth: 5 October 1984 (age 42)
- Place of birth: Paraná, Argentina
- Height: 1.79 m (5 ft 10 in)
- Position: Striker

Youth career
- 1999–2003: Boca Juniors

Senior career*
Years	Team	Apps	(Gls)
2003–2005	Boca Juniors	0	(0)
2004–2005	→ Ajax (loan)	0	(0)
2006	Universitario	23	(15)
2006	Millonarios	2	(1)
2007	→ Hapoel Ashkelon (loan)	14	(7)
2007–2010	Apollon Limassol	78	(45)
2010–2013	Sporting Gijón	70	(14)
2013–2015	Apollon Limassol	48	(27)
2015–2016	Al Wakrah	3	(0)
2016	→ Arka Gdynia (loan)	9	(1)
2016	→ Arka Gdynia II (loan)	1	(1)
2016	Mumbai City	0	(0)
2017	Nea Salamina	7	(0)
2018–2019	Atlètico Paraná	15	(2)
- * Club domestic league appearances and goals

Gastón Sangoy (born 5 October 1984) is an Argentine former professional footballer who played as a striker.

== Career ==
A product of the Boca Juniors youth system in Argentina, he was loaned out for most of his early career to clubs in the Netherlands, Israel and Cyprus. He played mainly as a second striker, but also as a right and left winger.

=== Universitario de Deportes ===
In January 2006, he moved to Peru to play for Universitario de Deportes. He played Copa Libertadores and scored 3 goals in 5 games.

=== Stint in Israel and settle in Cyprus ===
After trialling with Maccabi Tel Aviv, the club turned down the loan offer citing the players weight problems. He then found his way to Liga Leumit side, Hapoel Ashkelon. There he had a breakout season and guided the club to the Israel State Cup final. Despite his performances in the cup, the club was relegated to the Liga Artzit and Sangoy left Israel to sign with Cypriot club, Apollon Limassol. In April 2008, after several decent performances with his new club, he signed a four-year extension to his contract until 2012. Despite being a very disappointing season for Apollon Limassol, 2008–09 was for Sangoy the most prolific season in his career having scored 20 goals in 27 championship matches and as a result being the fans favourite. In May 2009 a very controversial decision was taken by the Cyprus Football Association (CFA). After announcing a month before that the league's top scorer was to be decided at the end of the regular season, who at the time was Sangoy, the CFA reversed its decision by saying that the top scorer was to be decided after the end of the play-offs. Thus Sangoy, who during this time was preserved by his coach for the more important cup matches, missed the "golden boot". In 2009, he became Apollon's captain.

In 2010, he played a major role in helping his team Apollon Limassol win the Cypriot Cup.

=== Al Wakrah ===
Sangoy joined Qatar Stars League side Al Wakrah in July 2015.

== Honours ==
Apollon Limassol

- Cypriot Cup: 2009–10

Arka Gdynia

- I liga: 2015–16

Individual

- Cypriot First Division top scorer: 2013–14
