= Pedro Orfila =

Spanish footballer

Personal information
- Full name: Pedro Orfila Artime
- Date of birth: 6 March 1988 (age 38)
- Place of birth: Luanco, Spain
- Height: 1.75 m (5 ft 9 in)
- Position: Defender

Team information
- Current team: Marino
- Number: 5

Youth career
- 1998–2000: Avilés
- 2001–2007: Sporting Gijón

Senior career*
Years	Team	Apps	(Gls)
2007–2012	Sporting Gijón B	111	(1)
2010–2014	Sporting Gijón	18	(0)
2013–2014	→ Racing Santander (loan)	25	(0)
2014–2015	Racing Santander	39	(0)
2015–2017	Numancia	51	(0)
2017–2018	Murcia	36	(5)
2018–2019	Cartagena	17	(0)
2019–2022	Atlético Baleares	73	(1)
2022–2024	Avilés	41	(0)
2024–	Marino	56	(1)
- * Club domestic league appearances and goals as of 14 May 2026

Pedro Orfila Artime (born 6 March 1988) is a Spanish footballer who plays as a right-back or a central defender for Marino de Luanco.

== Club career ==
=== Sporting Gijón ===
Born in Luanco, Asturias, Orfila joined Sporting de Gijón's academy at the age of 13. He spent the better part of his first four seasons as a senior with their reserves, in the Segunda División B.

Orfila made his competitive debut for the first team on 27 October 2010, playing the entire 3–1 away loss against RCD Mallorca in the round of 32 of the Copa del Rey. His La Liga bow only arrived on 19 February 2012, in a 1–1 home draw with Atlético Madrid where he excelled at right-back.

During his spell at the El Molinón, Orfila made 23 official appearances.

=== Racing Santander ===
For the 2013–14 campaign, Orfila was loaned to third-tier club Racing de Santander. In July 2014, after winning promotion to the Segunda División, he signed a permanent two-year contract as a free agent.

Orfila only missed three matches in 42 in 2014–15, but the Cantabrians were immediately relegated.

=== Later career ===
Orfila subsequently competed in divisions two and three, representing CD Numancia, Real Murcia CF, FC Cartagena and CD Atlético Baleares. On 16 December 2021, he scored twice as the latter side defeated top-flight Getafe CF 5–0 in the domestic cup; the opposition played more than one hour with one man less after Erick Cabaco was sent off for headbutting Isi Ros.
