= Nacho Cases =

Spanish footballer

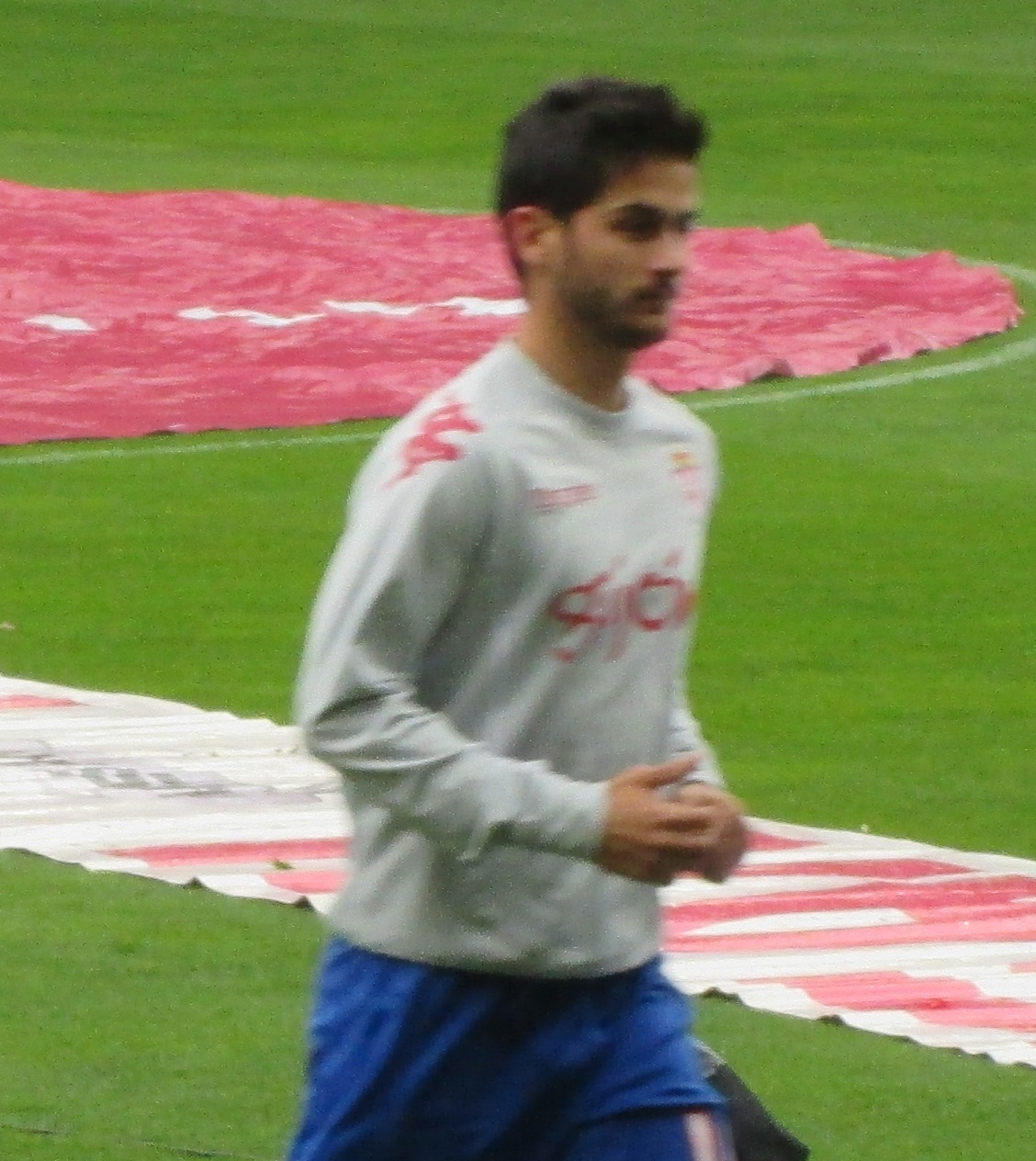
- Cases warming up for Sporting Gijón in 2014

Personal information
- Full name: Ignacio Cases Mora
- Date of birth: 22 December 1987 (age 38)
- Place of birth: Gijón, Spain
- Height: 1.74 m (5 ft 9 in)
- Position: Central midfielder

Youth career
- 1993–1994: Codema
- 1994–2006: Sporting Gijón
- 2004–2005: → Revillagigedo (loan)

Senior career*
Years	Team	Apps	(Gls)
2006–2011	Sporting Gijón B	134	(21)
2011–2017	Sporting Gijón	177	(9)
2017–2021	AEK Larnaca	56	(3)
2020	→ Volos (loan)	6	(0)
2021	Sūduva	25	(0)
2022	Anagennisi	13	(0)
2022–2023	Ermis	26	(2)
Total		437	(35)
- * Club domestic league appearances and goals

Ignacio 'Nacho' Cases Mora (born 22 December 1987) is a Spanish former professional footballer who played as a central midfielder.

He spent most of his career with Sporting de Gijón, appearing in 183 competitive games over the course of seven seasons (four in La Liga).

== Career ==
=== Sporting Gijón ===
Born in Gijón, Asturias, Cases was a product of Sporting de Gijón's prolific youth academy, Mareo. He made it to the B team during the 2006–07 season, with them playing in the Tercera División; although he proved instrumental in helping to achieve promotion one year later, he struggled for a place in the starting line-ups the following years.

It was not until the 2010–11 campaign, at the age of 23 years – and acting as captain with the reserves – that Cases was finally given his chance to make his first-team debut, starting in a 1–1 away draw against Racing de Santander on 9 January 2011. On 2 April, he assisted Miguel de las Cuevas in the 79th minute of a 1–0 win over Real Madrid at the Santiago Bernabéu Stadium, thus ending José Mourinho's nine-year unbeaten home league record. He finished his first season as a professional with 18 La Liga appearances, in an escape from relegation, having scored his first goal in the top flight on 15 January 2011 in the 2–0 home defeat of Hércules CF.

=== AEK Larnaca ===
On 22 June 2017, 29-year-old Cases announced he was leaving Sporting Gijón and bring to an end a 23-year association with the same club. Shortly after, he joined a host of compatriots at Cyprus' AEK Larnaca FC.

== Career statistics ==
As of match played on 4 January 2020

Appearances and goals by club, season and competition
Club	Season	League			Cup		Other		Total	
Club	Season	Division	Apps	Goals	Apps	Goals	Apps	Goals	Apps	Goals
Sporting Gijón B	2006–07	Tercera División	33	6	—		2 (Note: Appearances in Tercera División promotion play-offs)	0	35	6
Sporting Gijón B	2007–08	Tercera División	30	10	—		4	1	34	11
Sporting Gijón B	2008–09	Segunda División B	33	1	—		2 (Note: Appearances in Segunda División B relegation play-offs)	0	35	1
Sporting Gijón B	2009–10	Segunda División B	20	1	—		—		20	1
Sporting Gijón B	2010–11	Segunda División B	18	3	—		—		18	3
Sporting Gijón B	Total		134	21	—		8	1	142	22
Sporting Gijón	2010–11	La Liga	18	1	0	0	—		18	1
Sporting Gijón	2011–12	La Liga	21	0	1	0	—		22	0
Sporting Gijón	2012–13	Segunda División	33	2	1	1	—		34	3
Sporting Gijón	2013–14	Segunda División	27	2	0	0	1 (Note: Appearance in La Liga play-offs)	0	28	2
Sporting Gijón	2014–15	Segunda División	33	2	0	0	—		33	2
Sporting Gijón	2015–16	La Liga	24	1	1	0	—		25	1
Sporting Gijón	2016–17	La Liga	21	1	2	0	—		23	1
Sporting Gijón	Total		177	9	5	1	1	0	183	10
AEK Larnaca	2017–18	Cypriot First Division	25	0	6	1	0	0	31	1
AEK Larnaca	2018–19	Cypriot First Division	17	1	2	0	8 (Note: Appearances in UEFA Europa League)	0	27	1
AEK Larnaca	2019–20	Cypriot First Division	14	2	0	0	6	0	20	2
AEK Larnaca	Total		56	3	8	1	14	0	78	4
Career total			367	33	13	2	23	1	403	36

== Honours ==
AEK Larnaca

- Cypriot Cup: 2017–18
- Cypriot Super Cup: 2018
