= 2013–14 Sporting de Gijón season =

Real Sporting
2013–14 season
- President: Antonio Veiga
- Manager: Abelardo
- Stadium: El Molinón
- Segunda División: 5th
- Copa del Rey: Second round
- Top goalscorer: League: Stefan Šćepović (23 goals); All: Stefan Šćepović (23 goals)
- Highest home attendance: 22,315; Sporting 3–0 Tenerife
- Lowest home attendance: 13,265; Sporting 0–0 Recreativo
- Average home league attendance: 17,150
Home colours	Away colours	Third colours

The 2013–14 Sporting de Gijón season is the second season that the club will play in Segunda División after the relegation from the highest tier of football in Spain, La Liga.

== Season overview ==
=== Preseason ===
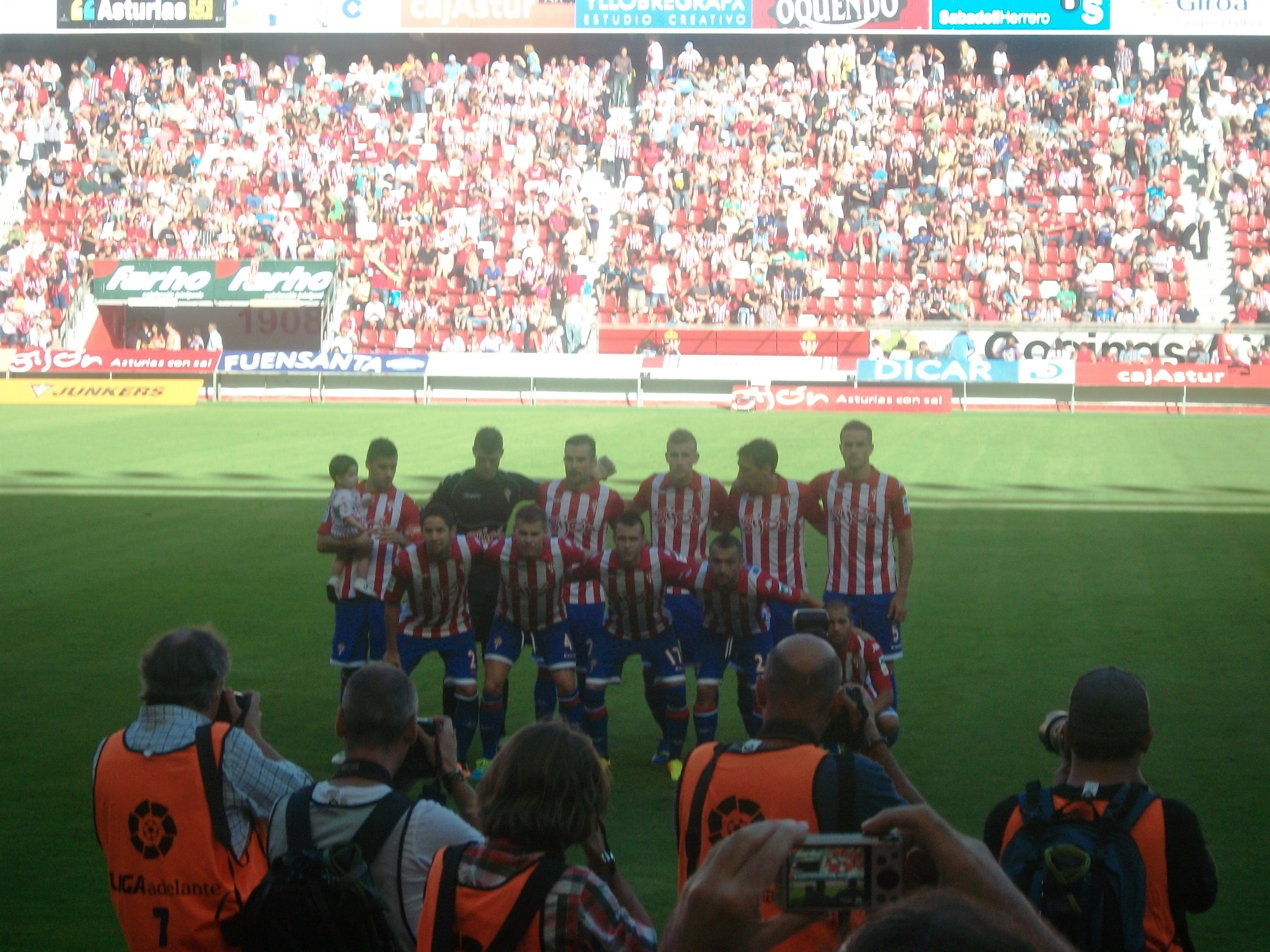
Starting 11 in the first match of 2013–14 Segunda División.

José Ramón Sandoval continued as head coach, despite a 2012–13 season where the team did not promote to La Liga.

Players like Mate Bilić or Juan Pablo who spent several years in Gijón, ended their contract and left the team. Also, David Rodríguez, Cristian Bustos and Bernardo finished their loan and came back to Celta de Vigo and Sevilla. The Colombian defender finally agreed to continue playing for Sporting during the next three seasons.

The first new additions came from Córdoba: Aritz López Garai and Alberto. Both players were free transfers.

On 21 June, president Manuel Vega-Arango resigned after spending 21 years in two stages as chairman of Sporting de Gijón. Antonio Veiga was named acting president while Vega-Arango was proposed as Honorary President of the club.

Hugo Fraile was the first sign in the month, fourth of the summer. He came from Getafe in a free transfer. Days later, Sporting de Gijón confirmed an agreement with Celta de Vigo for loaning Cristian Bustos during one more season. Bustos will be transferred to Sporting until 2016 if the club promotes to La Liga.

On 10 July, the team started the preseason in Mareo. In that same day, Javier Casquero extended his contract one more year. One week later, and after days of rumours, Serbian striker Stefan Šćepović arrived with a three-year loan from Partizan Belgrade. Sporting has an option for buying him at the end of the season or for extending the loan one more season.

Few days before the first friendly game, Isma López arrived from Athletic Bilbao while three footballers left Sporting: Óscar Trejo was transferred by €2.1m to French squad Toulouse FC and Gastón Sangoy and Ricardo León agreed with the club the rescission of their contracts. Argentinian player joined Apollon Limassol from Cyprus and León came back to Tenerife.

Grégory Arnolin played the 2013 CONCACAF Gold Cup with Martinique. The team was eliminated in the Group Stage.

Preseason started on 20 July with a loss in Segovia against English squad Brighton & Hove Albion by 1–2. Four days later, Sporting played its first game in Asturias against Marino de Luanco and solved it with an easy win by 3–0. Stefan Šćepović with two goals.

On 2 August, Asturian young prospect Borja López was transferred to AS Monaco by €2.2 million, and days later, Juan Muñiz was loaned to Mirandés.

Preseason ended with a loss by 1–4 against Villarreal in the classic Trofeo Villa de Gijón. Carlos Carmona scored the goal for Sporting.

=== August ===
Sporting started the league on 18 August playing at El Molinón against Real Madrid Castilla. The team of Sandoval won by 1–0 thanks to a beautiful goal of Stefan Šćepović. It was the first time since 2008 Sporting started the league with a win.

The team continued unbeaten in league with a draw at Recreativo de Huelva. Three days later, another Serbian striker was signed on loan: Dejan Lekić from Gençlerbirliği.

=== September ===
After a win by 2–0 against Deportivo de La Coruña, which was its fifth game unbeaten in the league, Sporting achieved the direct promotion positions. Stefan Šćepović became the first newcomer in the history of the club which scored in his first five league games.

Previously to this match, Sporting was eliminated of the Copa del Rey after an overtime against Recreativo de Huelva.

The first loss in league arrived in the sixth week at Mendizorroza, where Deportivo Alavés swept Sporting by a devastating 3–0 in the worst game at the moment of the team of Gijón. It was the first game of Šćepović without scoring.

In the next week, Sporting maintained unbeaten at El Molinón after beating Eibar by 3–2 thanks to a hat-trick of Šćepović, who celebrated his call-up with the Serbia national team.

=== October ===
October was not a good month for Sporting, with two ties at Numancia and versus Jaén in Gijón and a defeat by 2–1 at Girona despite starting leading the game with a goal of Hugo Fraile.

On 22 October, Stefan Šćepović was nominated by the LFP as September's best player in Segunda División.

=== November ===
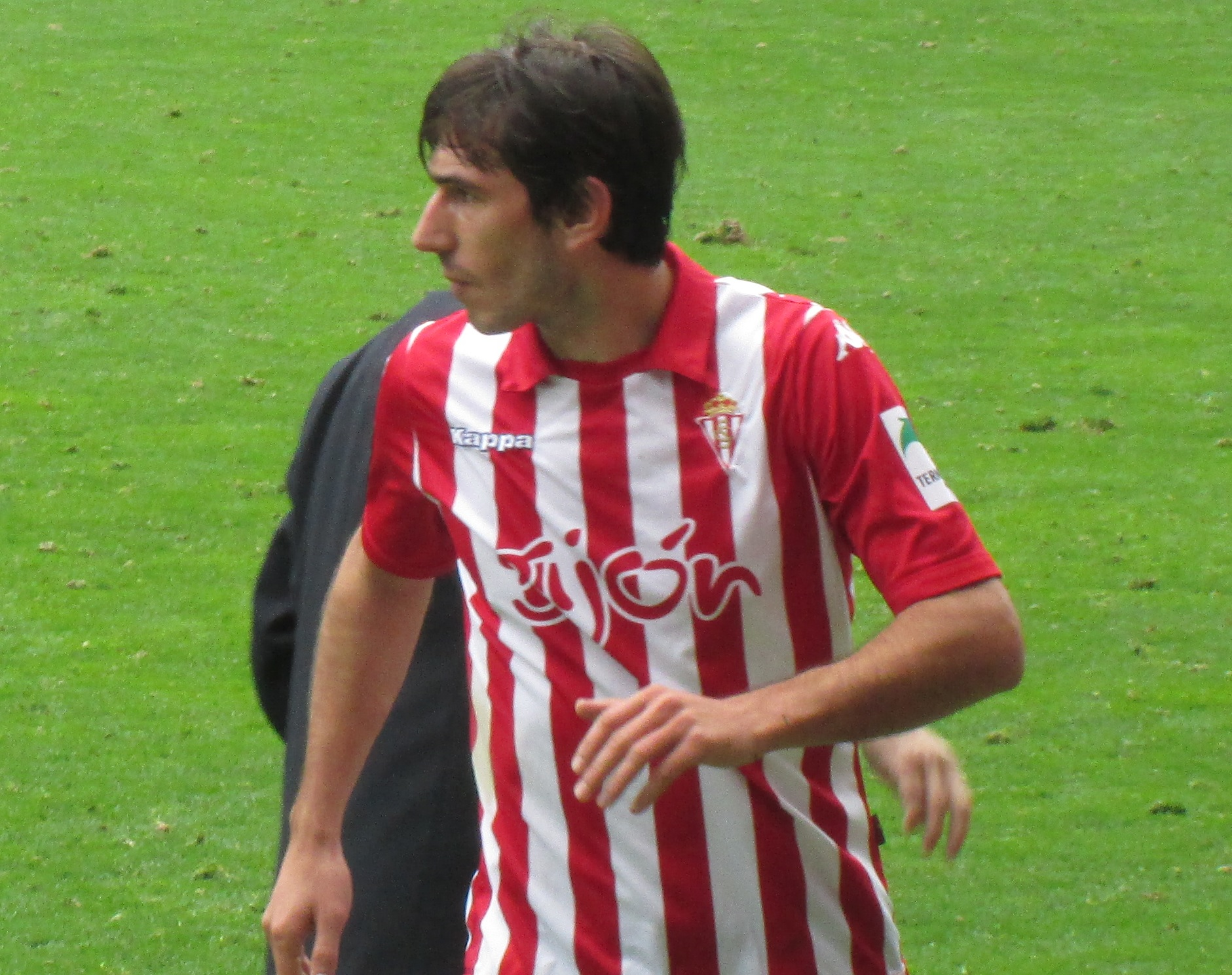
Dejan Lekić, who scored in the four games of the month of November

Dejan Lekić started to play regularly with Sporting and the team rose up in the league table. The second Serbian striker scored in the four games and contributed decisively to finish the month without being defeated, despite having played only one of the four games in the month at El Molinón. With two wins against Lugo and Sabadell and two ties, with serious refereeing errors, at the stadiums of Córdoba and Murcia (where the referee of the game did not call a penalty after a ball stopped with the hand by Joan Guillem Truyols), Sporting finished the month of November in promotion playoffs positions, with only a difference of three points with the direct promotion positions.

=== December ===
As in November, Sporting finished for second month in a row with two wins and two ties, which allowed to finish 2013 in the second position of the league table. A tie at El Molinón against Alcorcón by 2–2 was followed by two wins versus Hércules with a brilliant goal of Santi Jara and Mirandés by 3–2, with the three goals scored by the two Serbian strikers in only six minutes. After this game, Mirandés' coach Gonzalo Arconada was sacked.

The year finished with a 2–2 tie at Mini Estadi, against Barcelona B in a game where Stefan Šćepović goaled at 87', but a fantastic free kick executed by Edu Bedia avoided the loss of the reserve team of Barcelona.

=== January ===
On 4 January, Sporting was defeated at home by Zaragoza in a controversial game refereed by Andalusian Santos Pargaña, who sent off Luis Hernández, Iván Hernández and Nacho Cases. With eight players and with 2–2 in the scoreboard, Iván Cuéllar saved a penalty kick, but with only two minutes left, Sergio Cidoncha decided the game. In the half time of this match, manager José Ramón Sandoval was assaulted by the assistant coach of Zaragoza. After this game, the club board talked about a "shameful persecution", referring to the controversial refereeing games during the season.

The club finished the first half of the season with a draw without goals at Santa Cruz de Tenerife. This point allowed Sporting to be in the second position after 21 rounds with an advantage of one point with the third qualified team (Eibar) and two with the seventh (Las Palmas).

On 16 January, Aritz López Garai rejected several offers from Spanish, Greek and Cypriot teams, despite not being called by Sandoval since December, and decided to finish the season with the aim of achieving the promotion to La Liga.

Sporting became leader of the league after winning at Alfredo di Stéfano Stadium by 2–1 to Real Madrid Castilla, with the sixteenth goal of Stefan Šćepović, with only 12 minutes left. The team could not retain the leadership the next round; Sporting conceded a no-goals draw with Recreativo de Huelva. On 29 January, vice-captain Alberto Lora renewed its contract until 2018. On the next day, Nacho Cases renewed too for four years.

=== February ===
Sporting started the month of February beating Mallorca at Iberostar Estadi by 3–1 in a great game. It continued undefeated by fifth week in a row despite only earning a draw by 1–1 versus Ponferradina. Stefan Šćepović scored his 17th goal and three days later, on 12 February, Sporting paid the €1M buyout to Partizan.

On 16 February, Sporting earned a draw at Riazor by 1–1. 7,000 fans travelled from Gijón to A Coruña for watching the team against Deportivo. The game started with a goal of Bernardo for the red and whites. Later, in another controversial game, Deportivo missed a penalty kick, a legal goal was not conceded to Stefan Šćepović and Deportivo scored more than one minute after the end of the additional time.

Sporting finished the month earning a win by 2–0 against Deportivo Alavés, with goals made by Carmona and Santi Jara. After this win, the team of Sandoval accumulated seven weeks with no losses and was located in fourth position with 45 points, only one point behind the three leaders (Recreativo de Huelva, Deportivo de La Coruña and Eibar, team which Sporting visited in the first game of March).

=== March ===
In a very important game, Eibar defended the leadership sweeping Sporting by 3–0 at Ipurua. Despite this loss and two more weeks without winning (2–2 at home against Numancia and 3–2 versus Jaén), Sporting continued in the fourth position and rose to the third one with a win by 3–1 versus Girona. Dejan Lekić scored twice after several weeks since his last goal.

On 24 March, Aritz López Garai, who after being in the Starting XI in the first fourteen games did not play any minute more, was loaned to Córdoba. Six days later, Sporting was defeated by Las Palmas 2–1 in a game where the Serbians missed several opportunities to score. Finally, a doubtful penalty kick gave the three points to the Canarian team.

=== April ===
The bad streak continued in the first half of April, taking out Sporting from the promotion playoffs position. Two more losses against Córdoba and Sabadell, started to worry the club board and planned to sack José Ramón Sandoval as Sporting coach. Finally, president Antonio Veiga decided to keep the Madrilenian one more week, waiting to the result and the people reaction after the next game, against Murcia.

On 15 April 2014, Hugo Fraile broke the Anterior cruciate ligament of his left knee. With this important injury, the forward could not finish the season.

In the last game of the month, Sporting defeated Lugo by 2–0, for closing a streak of four games without winning and recovering the spot in the promotion playoffs, lost two weeks before. Stefan Šćepović scored his 22nd goal, six weeks before its last one at Real Jaén.

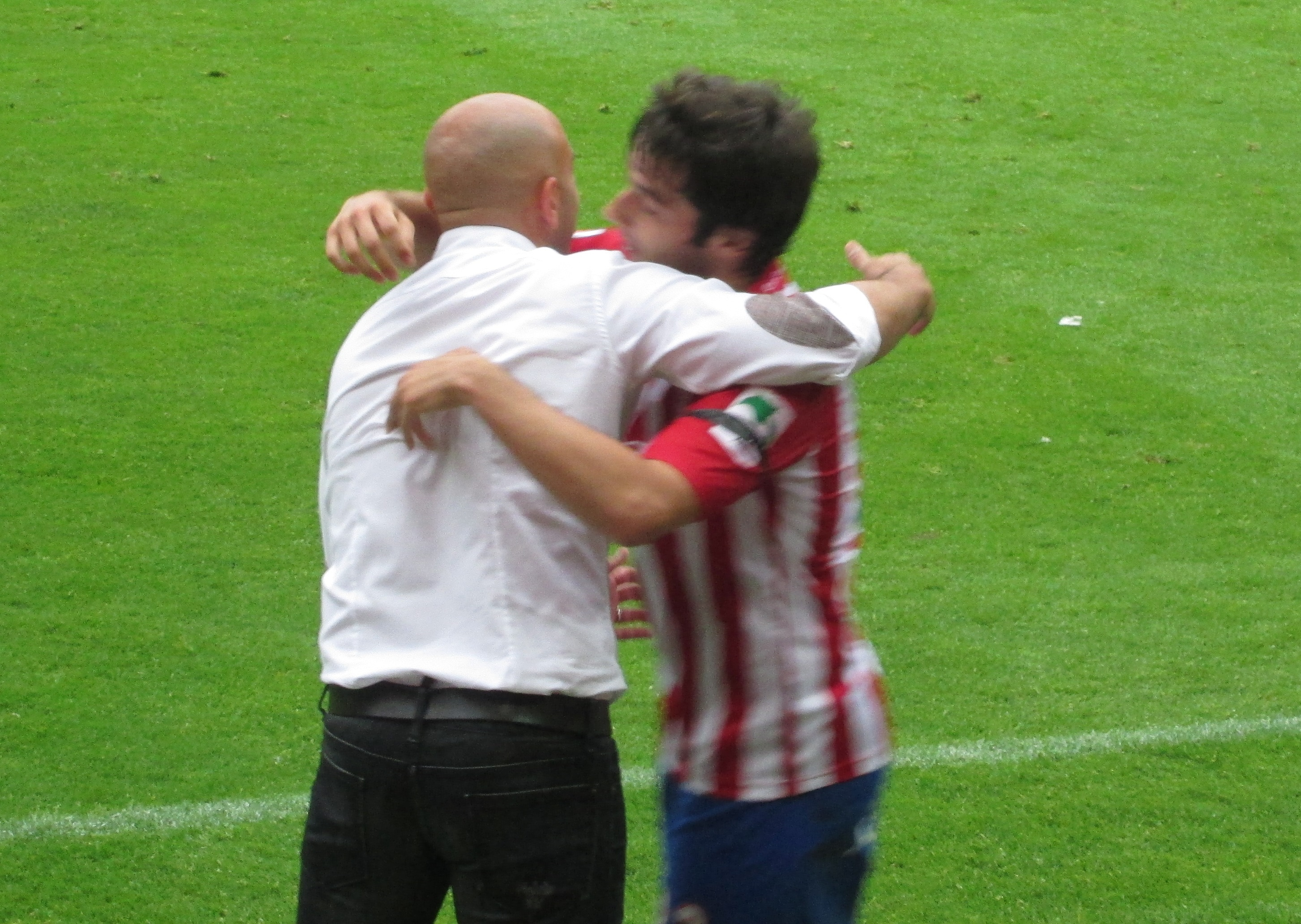
Abelardo and Jony embraces after the first goal in their debut game.

=== May ===
On 4 May, after the loss at Alcorcón by 1–0, the club board decided to sack José Ramón Sandoval. Abelardo, manager of the reserve team which won by 1–4 over Real Oviedo the week before, was named his substitute until the end of the season. On 7 May, Jony, player of the reserve team, agreed a professional two-year contract with the club.

In the debut game of both, on 10 May versus Hércules, Sporting won by 2–1. Jony scored his first goal and Dejan Lekić finished the comeback.

Sporting started an undefeated streak by earning one point at Mirandés and dropping Barcelona B, third qualified, with the second goal of Jony.

The team finished the month at La Romareda, drawing by 1–1 to Real Zaragoza thanks to a goal of Bernardo in the 88th minute. This point allowed Sporting to finish the month in fifth position with one game to play.

=== June ===
Sporting qualified to the promotion playoffs in the last day, with a win against Tenerife by 3–0. In the promotion playoffs, Sporting was dropped in the semifinals by Las Palmas by an aggregate score of 2–0.

== Players ==
=== Current squad ===
N	Pos.	Nat.	Name	Age	Since	App	Goals	Ends	Transfer fee	Notes
1	GK	(Spain)	Iván Cuéllar (vice-captain)	30	2008	55	0	2015	Free	
2	DF	(Spain)	Luis Hernández	25	2013	21	0	2016	Youth system	
4	DF	(Spain)	Mandi	25	2012	24	1	2016	Free	
5	DF	(Colombia)	Bernardo	24	2013 (Winter)	16	1	2016	Free	Second nationality: Spain
6	MF	(Spain)	Sergio Álvarez	22	2013	15	0	2015	Youth system	
7	MF	(Spain)	Javier Casquero	38	2013 (Winter)	9	2	2014	Free	
8	MF	(Spain)	Álex Barrera	23	2012	12	0	2016	Youth system	
9	FW	(Spain)	Miguel Ángel Guerrero	23	2012	17	2	2016	Youth system	
10	MF	(Spain)	Nacho Cases	26	2011	72	3	2018	Youth system	
11	MF	(Spain)	Alberto Lora (vice-captain)	27	2007	134	7	2018	Youth system	
12	FW	(Serbia)	Stefan Šćepović	24	2013	0	0	2018	€1M	
14	DF	(Spain)	Iván Hernández (captain)	34	2007	140	1	2015	Free	
15	DF	(Spain)	Roberto Canella (vice-captain)	26	2006	188	5	2017	Youth system	
16	FW	(Serbia)	Dejan Lekić	28	2013	0	0	2014	N/A	
17	FW	(Spain)	Santi Jara	23	2013	15	3	2016	Youth system	
18	MF	(Spain)	Isma López	24	2013	0	0	2016	N/A	
19	MF	(Spain)	Carlos Carmona	26	2012	32	4	2016	Free	
21	FW	(Spain)	Hugo Fraile	27	2013	0	0	2015	Free	
22	MF	(Guinea-Bissau)	Formose Mendy	25	2012 (Winter)	23	0	2016	Youth system	Second nationality: France
23	MF	(Spain)	Cristian Bustos	31	2013 (Winter)	16	0	2014	N/A	
24	FW	(Spain)	Álex Serrano	19	2013	0	0	2015	Youth system	
25	GK	(Spain)	Alberto	29	2013	0	0	2017	Free	

- Last updated: 12 February 2014
- Source: Stats updated as of the end of the 2012–13 season, ages updated as of the end of the 2013–14 season
- Ordered by squad number.

=== Youth system ===
Note: Flags indicate national team as defined under FIFA eligibility rules; some limited exceptions apply. Players may hold more than one non-FIFA nationality.

No.	Pos.	Nation	Player
26	DF	ESP	Álex Menéndez
27	DF	ESP	Julio
29	FW	ESP	Guillermo
30	GK	ESP	Dennis

No.	Pos.	Nation	Player
32	MF	ESP	Pablo Pérez
33	MF	ESP	Jony
35	FW	FRA	Yacine

=== In ===
No.	Pos.	Nat.	Name	Age	Moving from	Type	Transfer window	Ends	Transfer fee	Source
20	MF	(Spain)	Aritz López Garai	32	Córdoba	Transfer	Summer	2015	Free	Real Sporting
8	MF	(Spain)	Álex Barrera	22	Youth system	Promoted	Summer	2016	N/A	
9	FW	(Spain)	Miguel Ángel Guerrero	22	Youth system	Promoted	Summer	2016	N/A	
17	FW	(Spain)	Santi Jara	22	Youth system	Promoted	Summer	2016	N/A	
6	MF	(Spain)	Sergio Álvarez	21	Youth system	Promoted	Summer	2015	N/A	
25	GK	(Spain)	Alberto	28	Córdoba	Transfer	Summer	2018	Free	Real Sporting
5	DF	(Colombia)	Bernardo	23	Sevilla	Transfer	Summer	2016	Free	Real Sporting
21	FW	(Spain)	Hugo Fraile	26	Getafe	Transfer	Summer	2015	Free	Real Sporting
23	MF	(Spain)	Cristian Bustos	30	Celta de Vigo	Loan	Summer	2014	N/A	Real Sporting
12	FW	(Serbia)	Stefan Šćepović	23	Partizan (Serbia)	Loan	Summer	2016	N/A	Real Sporting
18	MF	(Spain)	Isma López	23	Athletic Bilbao	Transfer	Summer	2016	N/A	Real Sporting
24	FW	(Spain)	Álex Serrano	18	Youth system	Promoted	Summer	2016	N/A	El Comercio
16	FW	(Serbia)	Dejan Lekić	28	Gençlerbirliği (Turkey)	Loan	Summer	2014	N/A	Real Sporting

Total expenditure: €0 million

=== Out ===
No.	Pos.	Nat.	Name	Age	Moving to	Type	Transfer window	Transfer fee	Source
20	MF	(Spain)	Miguel de las Cuevas	26	Osasuna	Transfer	Summer	€1.2m	Todomercadoweb
1	GK	(Spain)	Juan Pablo	34	Maccabi Tel Aviv (Israel)	End of contract	Summer	Free	Real Sporting
18	FW	(Spain)	David Rodríguez	27	Celta de Vigo	Loan return	Summer	N/A	
23	MF	(Spain)	Cristian Bustos	30	Celta de Vigo	Loan return	Summer	N/A	
16	DF	(Colombia)	Bernardo	23	Sevilla	Loan return	Summer	N/A	
9	FW	(Croatia)	Mate Bilić	32	RNK Split (Croatia)	End of contract	Summer	N/A	Real Sporting
13	GK	(Spain)	Raúl	26	Sestao River	End of contract	Summer	N/A	Real Sporting
17	MF	(Spain)	Marcos Landeira	26	Caudal	End of contract	Summer	N/A	Fútbol Asturiano
24	FW	(Argentina)	Óscar Trejo	25	Toulouse (France)	Transfer	Summer	€2.1m	Real Sporting
10	FW	(Argentina)	Gastón Sangoy	28	Apollon Limassol (Cyprus)	Mutual consent	Summer	Free	Real Sporting
5	MF	(Spain)	Ricardo León	30	Tenerife	Mutual consent	Summer	Free	Real Sporting
12	DF	(France)	Grégory	32	Paços de Ferreira (Portugal)	Contract terminated	Summer	Free	Real Sporting
20	DF	(Spain)	Borja López	19	Monaco (France)	Transfer	Summer	€2.2m	Real Sporting
8	MF	(Spain)	Juan Muñiz	21	Mirandés	Loan	Summer	N/A	CD Mirandés
3	DF	(Spain)	Pedro Orfila	25	Racing Santander	Loan	Summer	N/A	Real Sporting
20	MF	(Spain)	Aritz López Garai	32	Córdoba	Loan		N/A	Real Sporting

Total income: €5.5 million

Net income: ▲€5.5 million

== Technical staff ==
Position	Staff
Manager	Abelardo Fernández
Assistant Manager	Iñaki Tejada
Goalkeeping Coach	Isidro Fernández
Physical Fitness Coach	Gerardo Ruiz
Director of Football	Raúl Lozano
Delegate	Quini
Academy Director	José María M. Acebal

Source: Sporting de Gijón Official Website

=== Managerial changes ===
Outgoing manager	Manner of departure	Date of vacancy	Replaced by	Date of appointment	Position in table
José Ramón Sandoval	Sacked	4 May 2014	Abelardo	4 May 2014	7th

== Competitions ==
=== Pre-season and friendlies ===
20 July 2013	Real Sporting	1–2	(England) Brighton & Hove Albion	La Albuera, Segovia
19:00	Nacho Cases 75' (pen.)	Summary	Barnes 7'; Ulloa 88'	Attendance: 500; Referee: Edgan Goes

24 July 2013	Marino de Luanco	0–3	Real Sporting	Miramar, Luanco
19:30		Summary	Iván Hernández 7'; Šćepović 66', 83'	Attendance: 1,700; Referee: Areces Franco

27 July 2013 Trofeo Emma Cuervo	Lugo	2–1	Real Sporting	Pepe Barrera, Ribadeo
19:30	Bernardo o.g.' (34); Sandaza 57'	Summary	Álex Barrera 43'	Attendance: 1,500; Referee: Eiriz Mata

30 July 2013	Real Sporting	1–0	Sesiones AFE	Pepe Ortiz, Gijón
19:00	Hugo Fraile 75'	Summary		Attendance: 1,000; Referee: César Ramos

31 July 2013 Memorial; Benjamín Villar	Real Sporting	2–1	Racing de Santander	Les Caleyes, Villaviciosa
19:15	Mandi 64' (pen.); López Garai 70'	Summary	Luque 20' (pen.)	Attendance: 1,300; Referee: Luis Álvarez

3 August 2013 Memorial; Ramón Losada	Real Sporting	1–1 (1–2 p)	Valladolid	La Veigona, Luarca
19:00	Bernardo 69'	Summary	Javi Guerra 40'	Attendance: 1,200; Referee: Granda Barros
	Penalties
	Carmona (penalty missed); Álex Serrano (penalty missed); Santi Jara (penalty scored); Julio (penalty missed); Álex Menéndez (penalty missed)		(penalty missed) Alcatraz; (penalty missed) Baraja; (penalty scored) Álvaro Rubio; (penalty scored) Bergdich; (penalty missed) Bueno

7 August 2013	Celta	0–1	Real Sporting	A Magdalena, Vilalba
19:00		Summary	Santi Jara 38'	Attendance: 250; Referee: Corral García

11 August 2013 Trofeo Villa de Gijón	Real Sporting	1–4	Villarreal	El Molinón, Gijón
20:00	Carmona 78'	Summary	Aquino 6'; Cani 22'; Perbet 58', 68'	Attendance: 10,000; Referee: González Fuerte

=== Segunda División ===
==== League table ====
Pos	Team	Pld	W	D	L	GF	GA	GD	Pts	Promotion, qualification or relegation
3	Barcelona B (Note: Barcelona B could not participate in the play-offs as they are Barcelona's reserve team, so the seventh positioned team qualified for the play-offs.)	42	20	6	16	60	46	+14	66	
4	Murcia (R)	42	16	17	9	55	44	+11	65	Qualification to the promotion play offs and relegation to Segunda División B (Note: Murcia failed to obtain a professional license and were relegated to the Segunda División B by the LFP while Mirandés was re-instated.)
5	Sporting Gijón	42	16	16	10	63	51	+12	64	Qualification to promotion play-offs
6	Las Palmas	42	18	9	15	51	50	+1	63	Qualification to promotion play-offs
7	Córdoba (O, P)	42	16	13	13	47	43	+4	61 (Note: COR 2–0 REC; REC 1–1 COR)	Qualification to promotion play-offs

Source: LFP - Liga Adelante
Rules for classification: 1st points; 2nd head-to-head points; 3rd head-to-head goal difference; 4th goal difference; 5th number of goals scored.
(O) Play-off winners; (P) Promoted; (R) Relegated

==== Results summary ====
Overall								Home						Away					
Pld	W	D	L	GF	GA	GD	Pts	W	D	L	GF	GA	GD	W	D	L	GF	GA	GD
42	16	16	10	63	51	+12	64	12	6	3	39	21	+18	4	10	7	24	30	−6

==== Positions by round ====
Round	1	2	3	4	5	6	7	8	9	10	11	12	13	14	15	16	17	18	19	20	21	22	23	24	25	26	27	28	29	30	31	32	33	34	35	36	37	38	39	40	41	42
Ground	H	A	H	A	H	A	H	A	H	A	H	A	H	A	A	H	A	H	A	H	A	A	H	A	H	A	H	A	H	A	H	A	H	A	H	H	A	H	A	H	A	H
Result	W	D	W	D	W	L	W	D	D	L	L	D	W	D	W	D	W	W	D	L	D	W	D	W	D	D	W	L	D	L	W	L	L	L	D	W	L	W	D	W	D	W
Position	5	6	3	3	1	4	4	2	3	6	8	11	5	8	6	5	3	3	2	2	2	1	2	2	3	4	4	4	4	4	3	4	5	8	8	6	7	6	6	4	5	5

Source: BDFútbol
A = Away; H = Home; W = Win; D = Draw; L = Loss

==== Matches ====
18 August 2013 1	Real Sporting	1–0	Real Madrid Castilla	El Molinón, Gijón
19:00	Šćepović 22'; Mandi (yellow card) 77'	Summary	Casado (yellow card) 88'	Attendance: 14,509; Referee: Pérez Pallás

25 August 2013 2	Recreativo de Huelva	1–1	Real Sporting	Nuevo Colombino, Huelva
19:00	Dimas (yellow card) 10'; Zamora (yellow card) 28'; Jesús Vázquez (yellow card) 67'; Arana 79' (pen.); Jorge Larena (yellow card) 87' (yellow-red card) 88'; Morcillo (yellow card) 89'	Summary	Mandi (yellow card) 44'; Šćepović 57'; Lora (yellow card) 64'; Jara (yellow card) 70'; Hugo Fraile (yellow card) 78'; Canella (yellow card) 88'	Attendance: 5,689; Referee: José María Sánchez Martínez

1 September 2013 3	Real Sporting	3–0	Mallorca	El Molinón, Gijón
12:00	López Garai (yellow card) 13'; Hugo Fraile 24', (yellow card) 54'; Barrera 65'; Šćepović 86'	Summary	Agus (red card) 14'; Ximo (yellow card) 15' (yellow-red card) 55'; Miguel Garcia (yellow card) 20'; Bigas (yellow card) 33'; Iñigo Pérez (yellow card) 78'	Attendance: 14,088; Referee: Figueroa Vázquez

8 September 2013 4	Ponferradina	2–2	Real Sporting	El Toralín, Ponferrada
17:00	Carpio (yellow card) 4'; Fofo 6', 52'; Juanjo (yellow card) 36'; Yuri (penalty missed) 48'; Javi Lara (yellow card) 90'	Summary	Šćepović 16'; Hugo Fraile (yellow card) 32'; López Garai (yellow card) 36'; Bernardo (yellow card) 45'; Lora (yellow card) 47'; Mandi (yellow card) 55'; Carmona 70'	Attendance: 7,500; Referee: Muñoz Mayordomo

15 September 2013 5	Real Sporting	2–0	Deportivo de La Coruña	El Molinón, Gijón
17:00	Bustos (yellow card) 22'; Mandi (yellow card) 40'; Šćepović 62' (pen.); Álex Barrera 69' (yellow card) 87'	Summary	Rudy (yellow card) 32'; Luisinho (yellow card) 61'; Insúa (yellow card) 61'; Juan Domínguez (yellow card) 71'	Attendance: 16,030; Referee: Bikandi Garrido

22 September 2013 6	Alavés	3–0	Real Sporting	Mendizorroza, Vitoria-Gasteiz
12:00	Bernardo 13' (o.g.); Viguera (yellow card) 20'; Ion Vélez (yellow card) 28'; Guzmán 28'; Beobide (yellow card) 37'; Luciano (yellow card) 47'; Toti 87'	Summary	Carmona (yellow card) 46'; Mandi (yellow card) 56'; Šćepović (yellow card) 60'	Attendance: 10,425; Referee: Melero López

28 September 2013 7	Real Sporting	3–2	Eibar	El Molinón, Gijón
18:00	Šćepović 5', 51' (pen.), 57'; Bernardo (yellow card) 12'; Iván Hernández (yellow card) 47'; López Garai (yellow card) 52'; Carmona (yellow card) 88'	Summary	Arruabarrena (yellow card) 8'; Capa (yellow card) 21' (goal) 45'; Yuri (yellow card) 51'; Raúl Navas (yellow card) 71'; Urko Vera 85'	Attendance: 15,081; Referee: Jaime Latre

5 October 2013 8	Numancia	0–0	Real Sporting	Los Pajaritos, Soria
18:00	Juanma (yellow card) 46'; Regalón (red card) 65'; Akapo (yellow card) 60'; Julio Álvarez (yellow card) 63'	Summary	Cuéllar (yellow card) 31'; López Garai (yellow card) 41'; Bernardo (yellow card) 64'; Bustos (yellow card) 89'	Attendance: 3,648; Referee: Sureda Cuenca

13 October 2013 9	Real Sporting	1–1	Jaén	El Molinón, Gijón
17:00	Hugo Fraile 23' (yellow card) 50'; Carmona (yellow card) 75'	Summary	Álex Cruz (yellow card) 13'; Jona 67'	Attendance: 16,023; Referee: Medié Jiménez

20 October 2013 10	Girona	2–1	Real Sporting	Montilivi, Girona
19:00	Migue (yellow card) 31'; Felipe 72' (pen.); Eloi Amagat 79'; Pere Pons (yellow card) 89'	Summary	Lora (red card) 72'; Hugo Fraile 12'; Nacho Cases (yellow card) 27'; Šćepović (yellow card) 80'; Bernardo (yellow card) 83'; Canella (yellow card) 89'	Attendance: 3,813; Referee: Lesma López

27 October 2013 11	Real Sporting	2–3	Las Palmas	El Molinón, Gijón
17:00	Hugo Fraile (yellow card) 25'; Mandi 29'; Šćepović 44'; Isma López (yellow card) 62'	Summary	Chrisantus 8', 23', 68'; Castillo (yellow card) 32'; David García (yellow card) 58'; Ángel (yellow card) 61'; Masoud (yellow card) 67'; Barbosa (yellow card) 83'	Attendance: 16,070; Referee: Ocón Arráiz

3 November 2013 12	Córdoba	2–2	Real Sporting	Nuevo Arcángel, Córdoba
12:00	López Silva (yellow card) 4'; Caballero 21' (pen.); Pedro 80' (yellow card) 87'	Summary	Bernardo (yellow card) 53'; Nacho Cases (yellow card) 67'; Carmona 75'; Lekić 89'	Attendance: 14,641; Referee: Valdés Aller

10 November 2013 13	Real Sporting	3–1	Sabadell	El Molinón, Gijón
17:00	Santi Jara (yellow card) 60'; Šćepović 64' (pen.); Lora (yellow card) 66'; Lekić 81' (yellow card) 81'; Álex Barrera 89'	Summary	Llorente 50'; Olmo (yellow card) 76'; Carlos Hernández (yellow card) 84'	Attendance: 15,800; Referee: Sagues Oscoz

16 November 2013 14	Murcia	1–1	Real Sporting	El Molinón, Gijón
18:00	Molinero 11'; Saúl (yellow card) 43'; Acciari (yellow card) 48'; Tete (yellow card) 71'	Summary	Lekić 17'; Bernardo (yellow card) 25'; Mandi (yellow card) 33'; Hugo Fraile (yellow card) 51'; Lora (yellow card) 89'	Attendance: 7,915; Referee: Ricardo de Burgos Bengoetxea

24 November 2013 15	Lugo	1–3	Real Sporting	Anxo Carro, Lugo
12:00	Seoane 6' (yellow card) 18'; Víctor Marco (yellow card) 74'; Pavón (yellow card) 78'	Summary	Luis Hernández 28'; Lekić 34'; Šćepović 52'; Carmona (yellow card) 89'	Attendance: 6,000; Referee: Bikandi Garrido

1 December 2013 16	Real Sporting	2–2	Alcorcón	El Molinón, Gijón
17:00	Lekić 13', 68'; Sergio Álvarez (yellow card) 20'; Nacho Cases (yellow card) 32'; Iván Hernández (yellow card) 50'; Bernardo (yellow card) 63'; Alberto (red card) 85' (in the bench)	Summary	Javito 15', 24'; Juli (yellow card) 60'; Dani Giménez (yellow card) 68'; Verdés (yellow card) 78'; Iribas (yellow card) 82'	Attendance: 15,535; Referee: José María Sánchez Martínez

7 December 2013 17	Hércules	0–1	Real Sporting	Rico Pérez, Alicante
18:00	Sissoko (yellow card) 40'; Escassi (yellow card) 51'	Summary	Santi Jara 3' (yellow card) 32'; Lekić (yellow card) 33'; Álex Barrera (yellow card) 50'; Luis Hernández (yellow card) 50'	Attendance: 7,009; Referee: Pérez Pallás

15 December 2013 18	Real Sporting	3–2	Mirandés	El Molinón, Gijón
17:00	Iván Hernández (yellow card) 29'; Lekić 33'; Šćepović 35', 39' (yellow card) 84'; Luis Hernández (yellow card) 61'; Nacho Cases (yellow card) 72'; Cuéllar (yellow card) 73'; Hugo Fraile (yellow card) 88'	Summary	Iván Agustín (yellow card) 13'; Prieto (red card) 40' (in the bench); Gaspar (yellow card) 89'	Attendance: 16,112; Referee: Melero López

21 December 2013 19	Barcelona B	2–2	Real Sporting	Mini Estadi, Barcelona
18:00	Sanabria 33'; Edu Bedia 92'	Summary	Iván Hernández (yellow card) 1'; Šćepović 15', 88'; Casquero (yellow card) 44'; Hugo Fraile (yellow card) 73'; Bernardo (yellow card) 86'	Attendance: 3,206; Referee: José Luis Munuera Montero

5 January 2014 20	Real Sporting	2–3	Zaragoza	El Molinón, Gijón
12:00	Iván Hernández (red card) 68'; Nacho Cases (red card) 82' (goal) 34'; Luis Hernández (red card) 53'; Sergio Álvarez 49'; Isma López (yellow card) 86'; Šćepović (yellow card) 87'	Summary	Roger 3'; Rico (yellow card) 21'; Leo Franco (yellow card) 27'; Alcolea (on bench) (yellow card) 45'; Montañés 57'; Víctor Rodríguez (penalty missed) 85'; Cidoncha 88'	Attendance: 17,654; Referee: Santos Pargaña
Note: José Ramón Sandoval was also sent off in the 87th minute. He was two games suspended.

12 January 2014 21	Tenerife	0–0	Real Sporting	Heliodoro Rodríguez, Santa Cruz de Tenerife
18:00	Javi Moyano (yellow card) 19'; Ricardo León (yellow card) 60'; Raúl Llorente (yellow card) 75'; Bruno (red card) 78'; Suso (yellow card) 78'; Aitor (yellow card) 78'	Summary	Álex Serrano (yellow card) 28'; Bernardo (yellow card) 88'	Attendance: 10,996; Referee: Medié Jiménez

18 January 2014 22	Real Madrid Castilla	1–2	Real Sporting	Alfredo di Stéfano, Madrid
18:00	Cabrera (yellow card) 28'; Jaime (yellow card) 56'	Summary	Carmona 35' (yellow card) 68'; Canella (yellow card) 68'; Iván Hernández (yellow card) 69'; Šćepović 79'; Nacho Cases (yellow card) 86'; Lora (yellow card) 88'	Attendance: 4,049; Referee: Jaime Latre

26 January 2014 23	Real Sporting	0–0	Recreativo de Huelva	El Molinón, Gijón
12:00	Casquero (yellow card) 49'; Santi Jara (yellow card) 57'	Summary	Montoro (yellow card) 38'; Arana (yellow card) 60'; Calvente (yellow card) 89'	Attendance: 13,265; Referee: Ricardo de Burgos Bengoetxea

2 February 2014 24	Mallorca	1–3	Real Sporting	Iberostar Estadi, Palma
12:00	Bigas (yellow card) 55'; Generelo 88'	Summary	Sergio Álvarez (yellow card) 25'; Nacho Cases 44' (yellow card) 83'; Canella 54'; Mandi (yellow card) 62'; Carmona 91' (yellow card) 91'	Attendance: 11,254; Referee: Figueroa Vázquez

9 February 2014 25	Real Sporting	1–1	Ponferradina	El Molinón, Gijón
17:00	Bernardo (yellow card) 44'; Mandi (yellow card) 61'; Lekić (yellow card) 80'; Šćepović 83'	Summary	Acorán 6'; Yuri (yellow card) 26' (red card) 54'; Alan Baró (yellow card) 39'; Javi Lara (yellow card) 50'; Bellvís (yellow card) 58'; Santamaría (yellow card) 83'	Attendance: 18,353; Referee: Arcediano Monescillo

16 February 2014 26	Deportivo de La Coruña	1–1	Real Sporting	Riazor, A Coruña
12:00	Marchena (yellow card) 24'; Borja Bastón (penalty missed) 29'; Núñez (yellow card) 57'; Toché 95'	Summary	Bernardo (yellow card) 16' (goal) 26'; Cuéllar (yellow card) 67'; Nacho Cases (yellow card) 88'; Hugo Fraile (yellow card) 93'; Mandi (yellow card)	Attendance: 26,532; Referee: José María Sánchez Martínez
Note: The yellow card of Mandi was shown after the end of the game.

22 February 2014 27	Real Sporting	2–0	Alavés	El Molinón, Gijón
18:00	Iván Hernández (yellow card) 41'; Carmona 57'; Santi Jara 90+2'	Summary	Lázaro (yellow card) 54'	Attendance: 18,317; Referee: José Luis Munuera Montero

2 March 2014 28	Eibar	3–0	Real Sporting	Ipurua, Eibar
12:00	Yuri (yellow card) 22'; Gilvan 41'; Jota 53'; Albentosa 58'; Dani García (yellow card) 74'; Errasti (yellow card) 83'	Summary	Luis Hernández (yellow card) 14'; Carmona (red card) 51'; Mandi (yellow card) 57'; Cuéllar (red card) 67'	Attendance: 4,292; Referee: Trujillo Suárez

9 March 2014 29	Real Sporting	2–2	Numancia	El Molinón, Gijón
17:00	Sergio Álvarez 7'; Šćepović 79' (pen.); Mendy (yellow card) 80'; Bernardo (yellow card) 89'	Summary	Juanma 16'; Palanca (yellow card) 63'; Julio Álvarez (yellow card) 70'; Regalón 72'; Biel Ribas (yellow card) 89'	Attendance: 22,050; Referee: Arias López

15 March 2014 30	Jaén	3–2	Real Sporting	La Victoria, Jaén
18:00	Jona 38', 83'; Óscar Rico 68'	Summary	Šćepović 2', 70'; Luis Hernández (yellow card) 34'; Bernardo (yellow card) 40'; Lora (yellow card) 49'; Mandi (yellow card) 68'; Sergio Álvarez (yellow card) 79'	Referee: Valdés Aller

23 March 2014 31	Real Sporting	3–1	Girona	El Molinón, Gijón
17:00	Santi Jara (yellow card) 15'; Bustos (yellow card) 22'; Lekić 25', 36'; Lora (yellow card) 45'; Sergio Álvarez (yellow card) 66'; Mandi (yellow card) 77'	Summary	Ortuño 34'; Timor (yellow card) 75'; Richy (yellow card) 88'	Attendance: 17,976; Referee: Ricardo de Burgos Bengoetxea

30 March 2014 32	Las Palmas	2–1	Real Sporting	Estadio Gran Canaria, Las Palmas
12:00	Aranda 51'; Masoud (yellow card) 57'; David García (yellow card) 82'; Momo 83' (pen.)	Summary	Sergio Álvarez (yellow card) 8'; Bernardo (yellow card) 38'; Canella (yellow card) 61'; Lekić 69'; Isma López (yellow card) 72'; Luis Hernández (yellow card) 80'; Mandi (yellow card) 82'; Cuéllar (yellow card) 82'	Attendance: 17,632; Referee: Arcediano Monescillo

6 April 2014 33	Real Sporting	1–2	Córdoba	El Molinón, Gijón
17:00	Lora (yellow card) 4'; Cuéllar (yellow card) 70'; Guerrero 87'; Santi Jara (yellow card) 89'	Summary	Pedro 40', 68' (yellow card) 75'; Luso (yellow card) 44'; Xisco (yellow card) 75'	Attendance: 19,184; Referee: Sureda Cuenca

12 April 2014 34	Sabadell	2–0	Real Sporting	Nova Creu Alta, Sabadell
20:00	Aníbal 86'; Tamudo 89'	Summary	Santi Jara (red card) 76'	Attendance: 3,198; Referee: Santos Pargaña

20 April 2014 35	Real Sporting	0–0	Murcia	El Molinón, Gijón
17:00	Mandi (yellow card) 29'	Summary	Dos Santos (yellow card) 17'; Truyols (yellow card) 36'; Álex Martínez (yellow card) 82'; Dorca (yellow card) 87'	Attendance: 16,273; Referee: Lesma López

26 April 2014 36	Real Sporting	2–0	Lugo	El Molinón, Gijón
18:00	Isma López 37'; Lekić (yellow card) 47'; Šćepović 86'	Summary	Carlos Pita (yellow card) 50'; Manu (yellow card) 76'; Rafa García (yellow card) 80'	Attendance: 16,927; Referee: Valdés Aller

3 May 2014 37	Alcorcón	1–0	Real Sporting	Santo Domingo, Alcorcón
18:00	Babin 17'; Pacheco (yellow card) 23'; Antonio Martínez (yellow card) 89'; Jony (red card) 90'	Summary	Bernardo (red card) 56'; Mandi (yellow card) 28'; Canella (yellow card) 36'; Lora (yellow card) 51'; Bustos (yellow card) 90'	Referee: López Acera

10 May 2014 38	Real Sporting	2–1	Hércules	El Molinón, Gijón
18:00	Lora (yellow card) 30'; Jony 38'; Lekić 63' (yellow card) 63'; Luis Hernández (yellow card) 72'; Guerrero (red card) 87'; Iván Hernández (yellow card) 88'	Summary	De Lucas 33' (yellow card) 65'; Eldin (yellow card) 35'; Ortiz (yellow card) 72'; Carbonell (yellow card) 73'	Attendance: 17,560; Referee: Jaime Latre

17 May 2014 39	Mirandés	1–1	Real Sporting	Anduva, Miranda de Ebro
20:00	Iván Agustín (yellow card) 37'; Iván Malón 89'	Summary	Carmona 14'; Bernardo (yellow card) 30'; Iván Hernández (yellow card) 82'	Attendance: 5,183; Referee: Arias López

24 May 2014 40	Real Sporting	1–0	Barcelona B	El Molinón, Gijón
16:00	Sergio Álvarez (yellow card) 25'; Jony 28'; Lekić (yellow card) 82'	Report	Ilie (yellow card) 41'; Masip (yellow card) 45'; Edu Bedia (yellow card) 87'	Attendance: 18,112; Referee: Valdés Aller

31 May 2014 41	Zaragoza	1–1	Real Sporting	La Romareda, Zaragoza
19:00	Roger (yellow card) 36' (goal) 40'; Víctor Rodríguez (yellow card) 58'; Arzo (yellow card) 64'; Álvaro Tierno (yellow card) 67'	Report	Mandi (yellow card) 25'; Bernardo 88'	Referee: Bikandi Garrido

7 June 2014 42	Real Sporting	3–0	Tenerife	El Molinón, Gijón
18:30	Lekić 3' (yellow card) 64'; Carmona 16'; Álex Menéndez (yellow card) 19'; Šćepović 35'	Summary	Luismi Loro (yellow card) 78'	Attendance: 22,315; Referee: Ricardo de Burgos Bengoetxea

=== Play-offs ===
==== Matches ====
11 June 2014 Semifinal; 1st leg	Las Palmas	1–0	Real Sporting	Estadio Gran Canaria, Las Palmas
22:00	Aranda 21'; Nauzet (yellow card) 34'; Castillo (yellow card) 45'	Summary	Bernardo (yellow card) 23'; Carmona (yellow card) 59'; Sergio Álvarez (yellow card) 86'	Attendance: 12,440; Referee: Ocón Arraiz

15 June 2014 Semifinal; 2nd leg	Real Sporting	0–1 (0–2 agg.)	Las Palmas	El Molinón, Gijón
19:00	Bernardo (yellow card) 36'; Nacho Cases (yellow card) 89'	Summary	Aythami Artiles (yellow card) 51'; Mariano Barbosa (yellow card) 82'; Asdrúbal 94'	Attendance: 20,073; Referee: Medié Jiménez

=== Copa del Rey ===
==== Matches ====
11 September 2013 2nd round	Recreativo de Huelva	3–2 (a.e.t.)	Real Sporting	Nuevo Colombino, Huelva
21:00	Linares 17', 69'; Fernando Vega (yellow card) 49'; Menosse (yellow card) 89'; Ezequiel 118'	Summary	Santi Jara (red card) 50'; Lekić 65' (yellow card) 89'; Iván Hernández 73'; Sergio Álvarez (yellow card) 85'	Attendance: 1,487; Referee: López Acera

== Statistics ==
=== Appearances and goals ===
No.	Pos	Nat	Player	Total		Segunda División		Play-offs		Copa del Rey	
No.	Pos	Nat	Player	Apps	Goals	Apps	Goals	Apps	Goals	Apps	Goals
1	GK	(Spain) ESP	Iván Cuéllar	42	0	40+0	0	2+0	0	0+0	0
2	DF	(Spain) ESP	Luis Hernández	39	1	33+3	1	2+0	0	1+0	0
4	MF	(Spain) ESP	Mandi	33	1	30+1	1	1+0	0	0+1	0
5	DF	(Colombia) COL	Bernardo	40	2	38+0	2	2+0	0	0+0	0
6	MF	(Spain) ESP	Sergio Álvarez	30	2	27+0	2	2+0	0	1+0	0
7	MF	(Spain) ESP	Javier Casquero	12	0	2+9	0	0+0	0	1+0	0
8	MF	(Spain) ESP	Álex Barrera	38	3	32+6	3	0+0	0	0+0	0
9	FW	(Spain) ESP	Miguel Ángel Guerrero	15	1	0+12	1	0+2	0	1+0	0
10	MF	(Spain) ESP	Nacho Cases	27	2	23+3	2	0+1	0	0+0	0
11	MF	(Spain) ESP	Alberto Lora	37	0	29+6	0	2+0	0	0+0	0
12	FW	(Serbia) SRB	Stefan Šćepović	41	23	39+0	23	2+0	0	0+0	0
14	DF	(Spain) ESP	Iván Hernández	18	1	15+1	0	0+1	0	1+0	1
15	DF	(Spain) ESP	Roberto Canella	37	1	35+1	1	1+0	0	0+0	0
16	FW	(Serbia) SRB	Dejan Lekić	36	13	21+12	12	2+0	0	0+1	1
17	MF	(Spain) ESP	Santi Jara	33	2	16+15	2	0+1	0	1+0	0
18	FW	(Spain) ESP	Isma López	21	1	13+6	1	1+0	0	0+1	0
19	MF	(Spain) ESP	Carlos Carmona	36	7	17+16	7	2+0	0	1+0	0
20	MF	(Spain) ESP	Aritz López Garai	14	0	14+0	0	0+0	0	0+0	0
21	FW	(Spain) ESP	Hugo Fraile	20	3	15+5	3	0+0	0	0+0	0
22	MF	(Guinea-Bissau) GNB	Formose Mendy	13	0	0+12	0	0+0	0	1+0	0
23	MF	(Spain) ESP	Cristian Bustos	17	0	11+5	0	1+0	0	0+0	0
24	FW	(Spain) ESP	Álex Serrano	2	0	2+0	0	0+0	0	0+0	0
25	GK	(Spain) ESP	Alberto	4	0	2+1	0	0+0	0	1+0	0
26	DF	(Spain) ESP	Álex Menéndez	7	0	3+2	0	1+0	0	1+0	0
27	DF	(Spain) ESP	Julio	1	0	0+0	0	0+0	0	1+0	0
29	FW	(Spain) ESP	Guillermo	0	0	0+0	0	0+0	0	0+0	0
30	GK	(Spain) ESP	Dennis	0	0	0+0	0	0+0	0	0+0	0
32	MF	(Spain) ESP	Pablo Pérez	3	0	1+2	0	0+0	0	0+0	0
33	MF	(Spain) ESP	Jony	7	2	5+0	2	1+1	0	0+0	0
35	FW	(France) FRA	Yacine Qasmi	0	0	0+0	0	0+0	0	0+0	0

=== Disciplinary record ===
N	P	Nat.	Name	2ª División			Playoffs			Copa del Rey			Total			Notes
N	P	Nat.	Name	Yellow card	Second yellow card	Red card	Yellow card	Second yellow card	Red card	Yellow card	Second yellow card	Red card	Yellow card	Second yellow card	Red card	Notes
17	FW	(Spain)	Santi Jara	6		1						1	6		2	
1	GK	(Spain)	Iván Cuéllar	5		1							5		1	
25	GK	(Spain)	Alberto			1									1	One sent off being in bench
5	DF	(Colombia)	Bernardo	17	1		2						19	1		
11	MF	(Spain)	Alberto Lora	10	1								10	1		6 times captain
10	MF	(Spain)	Nacho Cases	8	1		1						9	1		
14	DF	(Spain)	Iván Hernández	9	1								9	1		16 times captain
19	MF	(Spain)	Carlos Carmona	7	1		1						8	1		
2	DF	(Spain)	Luis Hernández	7	1								7	1		One yellow card retired
9	FW	(Spain)	Miguel Ángel Guerrero	1	1								1	1		
4	MF	(Spain)	Mandi	17									17			One yellow card retired
21	FW	(Spain)	Hugo Fraile	9									9			
6	MF	(Spain)	Sergio Álvarez	6			1			1			8			
16	FW	(Serbia)	Dejan Lekić	7						1			8			
15	DF	(Spain)	Roberto Canella	5									5			23 times captain
12	FW	(Serbia)	Stefan Šćepović	4									4			
20	MF	(Spain)	Aritz López Garai	4									4			
23	MF	(Spain)	Cristian Bustos	4									4			
18	FW	(Spain)	Isma López	3									3			
7	MF	(Spain)	Javier Casquero	2									2			
8	MF	(Spain)	Álex Barrera	2									2			
22	MF	(Guinea-Bissau)	Formose Mendy	1									1			
24	FW	(Spain)	Álex Serrano	1									1			
26	DF	(Spain)	Álex Menéndez	1									1			

Source: Competitive matches and RFEF.es
Ordered by (red card) , (second yellow card) and (yellow card)
(yellow card) = Number of bookings; (second yellow card) = Number of sending offs after a second yellow card; (red card) = Number of sending offs by a direct red card.

== Man of the match ==
The Man of the match is selected by Sporting de Gijón fans in the official website every week Iafter the game. 100 points will be given to the most voted player, 50 to the second one and 25 to the third one.

After the end of the main league, Stefan Šćepović was named winner of the trophy.

=== Voting per game ===
Rd	Player	%	Second	%	Third	%
1	Stefan Šćepović	62.9	Álex Barrera	9.4	Mandi	6.9
2	Mandi	43.0	Stefan Šćepović	25.5	Hugo Fraile	8.6
3	Hugo Fraile	32.8	Stefan Šćepović	26.8	Álex Barrera	23.0
4	Stefan Šćepović	37.3	Alberto Lora	32.3	Iván Cuéllar	17.4
5	Stefan Šćepović	42.9	Álex Barrera	22.4	Alberto Lora	9.0
6	Javier Casquero	33.8	Carlos Carmona	27.4	Stefan Šćepović	13.1
7	Stefan Šćepović	45.3	Isma López	15.2	Álex Barrera	13.9
8	Isma López	29.7	Alberto Lora	17.6	Bernardo	14.7
9	Alberto Lora	36.9	Iván Cuéllar	35.3	Mandi	12.9
10	Nacho Cases	29.4	Stefan Šćepović	17.5	Alberto Lora	13.8
11	Nacho Cases	33.3	Stefan Šćepović	29.3	Mandi	17.8
12	Dejan Lekić	31.9	Nacho Cases	29.8	Stefan Šćepović	12.8
13	Dejan Lekić	42.0	Álex Barrera	37.0	Stefan Šćepović	8.4
14	Dejan Lekić	47.0	Álex Barrera	13.6	Nacho Cases	12.9
15	Stefan Šćepović	31.7	Dejan Lekić	31.5	Bernardo	14.9
16	Dejan Lekić	38.5	Álex Barrera	36.0	Stefan Šćepović	16.9
17	Álex Barrera	31.3	Iván Cuéllar	19.8	Sergio Álvarez	15.1
18	Stefan Šćepović	29.0	Roberto Canella	26.5	Sergio Álvarez	19.8
19	Stefan Šćepović	38.2	Álex Barrera	34.6	Sergio Álvarez	23.7
20	Álex Barrera	45.6	Sergio Álvarez	35.4	Nacho Cases	6.6
21	Dejan Lekić	26.7	Iván Cuéllar	25.2	Luis Hernández	19.8
22	Carlos Carmona	29.0	Stefan Šćepović	27.8	Sergio Álvarez	27.4
23	Mandi	25.9	Álex Barrera	24.1	Sergio Álvarez	21.3
24	Nacho Cases	28.2	Álex Barrera	24.0	Roberto Canella	18.8
25	Stefan Šćepović	41.9	Sergio Álvarez	35.2	Roberto Canella	7.7
26	Nacho Cases	37.1	Bernardo	28.2	Sergio Álvarez	23.8
27	Nacho Cases	31.7	Iván Cuéllar	26.2	Sergio Álvarez	24.5
28	Alberto Lora	27.8	Nacho Cases	26.7	Alberto	24.7
29	Sergio Álvarez	36.5	Nacho Cases	32.1	Alberto Lora	10.6
30	Stefan Šćepović	32.8	Nacho Cases	24.5	Alberto Lora	21.7
31	Dejan Lekić	31.2	Stefan Šćepović	26.3	Nacho Cases	21.1
32	Alberto Lora	32.7	Nacho Cases	25.1	Cristian Bustos	21.0
33	Alberto Lora	45.6	Miguel Ángel Guerrero	35.3	Isma López	7.4
34	Alberto Lora	32.3	Isma López	29.8	Santi Jara	18.4
35	Alberto Lora	58.9	Miguel Ángel Guerrero	29.6	Isma López	4.8
36	Isma López	47.1	Miguel Ángel Guerrero	38.8	Sergio Álvarez	8.7
37	Miguel Ángel Guerrero	27.0	Alberto Lora	23.8	Sergio Álvarez	21.3
38	Jony	28.5	Álex Barrera	25.3	Álex Menéndez	22.9
39	Jony	39.0	Álex Barrera	31.6	Sergio Álvarez	23.1
40	Carlos Carmona	29.4	Jony	28.5	Sergio Álvarez	18.7
41	Álex Barrera	44.6	Pablo Pérez	27.2	Alberto Lora	13.6
42	Dejan Lekić	31.0	Álex Barrera	27.9	Pablo Pérez	18.5

=== Accumulated points ===
Pos	Player	Pts
1	Stefan Šćepović	1,300
2	Álex Barrera	900
3	Alberto Lora	875
4	Nacho Cases	825
5	Dejan Lekić	750
6	Sergio Álvarez	475
7	Isma López	350
8	Mandi	275
9	Carlos Carmona	250
9	Miguel Ángel Guerrero	250
9	Jony	250
10	Iván Cuéllar	225
13	Hugo Fraile	125
14	Bernardo	100
14	Roberto Canella	100
14	Javier Casquero	100
17	Pablo Pérez	75
18	Alberto	25
18	Álex Menéndez	25
18	Cristian Bustos	25
18	Luis Hernández	25
18	Santi Jara	25

== See also ==
- 2013–14 Segunda División
- 2013–14 Copa del Rey
