= 2014 Segunda División play-offs =

Segunda División play-offs
- Season: 2013–14
- Promoted: Córdoba
- Matches played: 6
- Goals scored: 7 (1.17 per match)

The 2014 Segunda División play-offs took place in June 2014 and has determined the third team which will be promoted to the top division. Teams placed between 3rd and 6th position (excluding reserve teams) are taking part in the promotion play-offs.

The regulations are the same as the previous season: in the semifinals the fifth placed team faces the fourth, while the sixth placed team faces the third. In case of a draw, extra time was played but there was a penalty shoot-out; the winner will be the best positioned team. The first leg of the semi-finals was played on 11 June, and the second leg on 15 June at home of the best positioned team. The final will also be two-legged, with the first leg on 19 June and the second leg on 22 June, with the best positioned team also playing the second leg at home.

== Road to the playoffs ==
=== League table ===
Pos	Team	Pld	W	D	L	GF	GA	GD	Pts	Qualification
3	Barcelona B	42	20	6	16	60	46	+14	66 (Note: Ineligible for promotion)	Not eligible
4	Murcia	42	16	17	9	55	44	+11	65	Promotion play-offs
5	Sporting Gijón	42	16	16	10	63	51	+12	64	Promotion play-offs
6	Las Palmas	42	18	9	15	51	50	+1	63	Promotion play-offs
7	Córdoba	42	16	13	13	47	43	+4	61	Promotion play-offs

== Overview ==
The two non-seeded teams, Córdoba and Las Palmas qualified for the final game. Both teams won away in the second leg of the round.

In the finals, a goal of Ulises Dávila in the 94th minute gave the promotion place to Córdoba CF. Just one minute before, the game was stopped due to an invasion of the pitch of several fans of Las Palmas, who wanted to celebrate the promotion before time.

After the playoffs, Real Murcia was relegated to Segunda División B due to financial irregularities.

== Promotion play-offs ==
Semi-finals
6	Las Palmas	1	1	2
5	Sporting de Gijón	0	0	0
7	Córdoba	0	2	2
4	Murcia	0	1	1

Final
7	Córdoba	0	1	1
6	Las Palmas	0	1	1

=== Semifinals ===
Team 1	Agg.	Team 2	1st leg	2nd leg
Sporting Gijón	0–2	Las Palmas	0–1	0–1
Murcia	1–2	Córdoba	0–0	1–2

==== First leg ====
11 June 2014
20:00 CEST

Córdoba	0–0	Murcia
	Report

Nuevo Arcángel, Córdoba
Attendance: 14,000
Referee: Arcediano Monescillo

Córdoba	Murcia

GK	1	(Spain) Juan Carlos
DF	29	(Spain) Daniel Pinillos
DF	17	(Uruguay) Adrián Gunino	(yellow card) 30'
DF	6	(Spain) Luso
DF	28	(Spain) Fran Cruz	(yellow card) 22'
DF	4	(Spain) Iago Bouzón
MF	20	(Spain) Juanlu	(yellow card) 53'	(substituted off) 85'
MF	24	(Spain) Pelayo		(substituted off) 26'
MF	23	(Spain) Abel
MF	15	(Spain) Pedro
FW	11	(Spain) Arturo		(substituted off) 72'
Substitutions:
GK	13	(Spain) Mikel Saizar
DF	3	(Spain) Samu		(substituted in) 85'
FW	9	(Spain) Xisco		(substituted in) 72'
FW	10	(Mexico) Ulises Dávila		(substituted in) 26'
MF	22	(Spain) Aritz López Garai
DF	27	(Spain) Fran Cruz
DF	33	(Spain) Eduard Campabadal
Manager:
(Spain) Albert Ferrer

GK	1	(Spain) Casto
DF	7	(Spain) Francisco Molinero	(yellow card) 61'
DF	14	(Argentina) Mauro dos Santos	(yellow card) 44'
DF	4	(Spain) Joan Guillem Truyols
DF	3	(Spain) Álex Martínez
MF	23	(Spain) Albert Dorca
MF	10	(Spain) Daniel Toribio	(yellow card) 37'	(substituted off) 65'
MF	8	(Spain) Eddy Pascual	(yellow card) 3'
FW	17	(Spain) Kike García	(yellow card) 82'
FW	11	(Spain) Wellington		(substituted off) 87'
FW	9	(Spain) Saúl Berjón
Substitutions:
GK	25	(Spain) Fernando
DF	5	(Spain) Pedro Alcalá
MF	15	(Argentina) José Acciari (yellow card) 89'	(substituted in) 87'
MF	18	(Spain) Miguel Albiol
MF	19	(Spain) Iván Moreno
FW	21	(France) Dominique Malonga
DF	24	(Spain) Dani Bautista		(substituted in) 46'
Manager:
(Spain) Julio Velázquez

11 June 2014
21:00 WEST

Las Palmas	1–0	Sporting de Gijón
Aranda 21'	Report

Gran Canaria, Las Palmas de Gran Canaria
Attendance: 12,440
Referee: Ocón Arraiz

Las Palmas	Sporting

GK	1	(Argentina) Mariano Barbosa
DF	6	(Spain) Ángel
DF	16	(Spain) Aythami
DF	15	(Spain) Deivid
DF	20	(Spain) Xabi Castillo	(yellow card) 44'
MF	18	(Spain) Javi Castellano
MF	21	(Spain) Juan Carlos Valerón		(substituted off) 70'
MF	11	(Spain) Momo		(substituted off) 76'
MF	10	(Spain) Apoño
MF	7	(Spain) Nauzet Alemán	(yellow card) 33'
FW	25	(Spain) Carlos Aranda		(substituted off) 88'
Substitutions:
GK	13	(Spain) Raúl Lizoain
MF	4	(Spain) Vicente Gómez		(substituted in) 70'
DF	5	(Spain) David García
FW	8	(Spain) Benja
FW	9	(Nigeria) Macauley Chrisantus		(substituted in) 88'
MF	14	(Spain) Hernán Santana
FW	27	(Spain) Asdrúbal		(substituted in) 76'
Manager:
(Spain) Josico

GK	1	(Spain) Iván Cuéllar
DF	11	(Spain) Alberto Lora
DF	5	(Colombia) Bernardo	(yellow card) 23'
DF	2	(Spain) Luis Hernández
DF	26	(Spain) Álex Menéndez		(substituted off) 9'
MF	19	(Spain) Carlos Carmona	(yellow card) 58'
MF	23	(Spain) Cristian Bustos
MF	6	(Spain) Sergio Álvarez	(yellow card) 85'
MF	18	(Spain) Isma López		(substituted off) 61'
FW	16	(Serbia) Dejan Lekić
FW	12	(Serbia) Stefan Šćepović		(substituted off) 78'
Substitutions:
GK	25	(Spain) Alberto
MF	4	(Spain) Mandi
FW	9	(Spain) Miguel Ángel Guerrero		(substituted in) 78'
DF	14	(Spain) Iván Hernández		(substituted in) 9'
MF	17	(Spain) Santi Jara
MF	32	(Spain) Pablo Pérez
MF	33	(Spain) Jony		(substituted in) 61'
Manager:
(Spain) Abelardo

==== Second leg ====
15 June 2014
19:00 CEST

Sporting de Gijón	0–1	Las Palmas
	Report	Asdrúbal 90+4'

El Molinón, Gijón
Attendance: 20,073
Referee: Medié Jiménez

Sporting	Las Palmas

GK	1	(Spain) Iván Cuéllar
DF	11	(Spain) Alberto Lora
DF	5	(Colombia) Bernardo	(yellow card) 36'
DF	2	(Spain) Luis Hernández
DF	15	(Spain) Roberto Canella
MF	19	(Spain) Carlos Carmona
MF	4	(Spain) Mandi		(substituted off) 60'
MF	6	(Spain) Sergio Álvarez
MF	33	(Spain) Jony		(substituted off) 78'
FW	16	(Serbia) Dejan Lekić		(substituted off) 73'
FW	12	(Serbia) Stefan Šćepović
Substitutions:
GK	25	(Spain) Alberto
FW	9	(Spain) Miguel Ángel Guerrero		(substituted in) 73'
MF	10	(Spain) Nacho Cases	(yellow card) 89'	(substituted in) 60'
DF	14	(Spain) Iván Hernández
MF	17	(Spain) Santi Jara		(substituted in) 78'
MF	23	(Spain) Cristian Bustos
MF	32	(Spain) Pablo Pérez
Manager:
(Spain) Abelardo

GK	1	(Argentina) Mariano Barbosa	(yellow card) 82'
DF	6	(Spain) Ángel
DF	16	(Spain) Aythami	(yellow card) 51'
DF	15	(Spain) Deivid
DF	20	(Spain) Xabi Castillo
MF	18	(Spain) Javi Castellano
MF	11	(Spain) Momo		(substituted off) 66'
MF	10	(Spain) Apoño
MF	7	(Spain) Nauzet Alemán
MF	4	(Spain) Vicente Gómez		(substituted off) 75'
FW	25	(Spain) Carlos Aranda		(substituted off) 89'
Substitutions:
GK	13	(Spain) Raúl Lizoain
DF	5	(Spain) David García
FW	8	(Spain) Benja
FW	9	(Nigeria) Macauley Chrisantus
MF	14	(Spain) Hernán Santana		(substituted in) 89'
MF	21	(Spain) Juan Carlos Valerón		(substituted in) 66'
FW	27	(Spain) Asdrúbal		(substituted in) 75'
Manager:
(Spain) Josico

15 June 2014
21:00 CEST

Murcia	1–2	Córdoba
Wellington 52'	Report	Pedro 7'; Raúl Bravo 57'

Nueva Condomina, Murcia
Attendance: 16,794
Referee: Jaime Latre

Murcia	Córdoba

GK	1	(Spain) Casto
DF	7	(Spain) Francisco Molinero
DF	14	(Argentina) Mauro dos Santos
DF	24	(Spain) Dani Bautista	(yellow card) 34'	(substituted off) 46'
MF	23	(Spain) Albert Dorca	(yellow card) 20'	(substituted off) 65'
MF	10	(Spain) Daniel Toribio
MF	8	(Spain) Eddy Pascual
DF	3	(Spain) Álex Martínez		(substituted off) 77'
FW	17	(Spain) Kike García
FW	11	(Spain) Wellington	(yellow card) 89'
FW	9	(Spain) Saúl Berjón
Substitutions:
GK	25	(Spain) Fernando
DF	4	(Spain) Joan Guillem Truyols
DF	5	(Spain) Pedro Alcalá
MF	15	(Argentina) José Acciari
MF	19	(Spain) Iván Moreno		(substituted in) 65'
FW	20	(Spain) Tete		(substituted in) 77'
FW	21	(France) Dominique Malonga		(substituted in) 46'
Manager:
(Spain) Julio Velázquez

GK	1	(Spain) Juan Carlos
DF	29	(Spain) Daniel Pinillos
DF	17	(Uruguay) Adrián Gunino
DF	6	(Spain) Luso
DF	28	(Spain) Fran Cruz
DF	4	(Spain) Iago Bouzón	(yellow card) 68'
MF	23	(Spain) Abel		(substituted off) 85'
MF	20	(Spain) Juanlu	(yellow card) 5'	(substituted off) 46'
MF	15	(Spain) Pedro
FW	11	(Spain) Arturo		(substituted off) 56'
FW	10	(Mexico) Ulises Dávila
Substitutions:
GK	13	(Spain) Mikel Saizar
FW	9	(Spain) Xisco
DF	14	(Spain) Raúl Bravo	(yellow card) 86'	(substituted in) 46'
MF	22	(Spain) Aritz López Garai	(yellow card) 61'	(substituted in) 56'
DF	27	(Spain) Fran Cruz
DF	33	(Spain) Eduard Campabadal		(substituted in) 85'
FW	35	(Spain) Sergio Mendigutxia
Manager:
(Spain) Albert Ferrer

=== Final ===
Team 1	Agg.	Team 2	1st leg	2nd leg
Las Palmas	1–1 (a)	Córdoba	0–0	1–1

==== First leg ====
19 June 2014
20:00 CEST
First leg

Córdoba	0–0	Las Palmas
	Report

Nuevo Arcángel, Córdoba
Attendance: 19,000
Referee: Vicandi Garrido

Córdoba	Las Palmas

GK	1	(Spain) Juan Carlos
DF	29	(Spain) Daniel Pinillos
DF	17	(Uruguay) Adrián Gunino
DF	6	(Spain) Luso		(substituted off) 30'
DF	28	(Spain) Fran Cruz	(yellow card) 88'
DF	4	(Spain) Iago Bouzón
MF	23	(Spain) Abel
MF	20	(Spain) Juanlu		(substituted off) 72'
MF	15	(Spain) Pedro
FW	10	(Mexico) Ulises Dávila
FW	9	(Spain) Xisco	(yellow card) 44'	(substituted off) 62'
Substitutions:
GK	13	(Spain) Mikel Saizar
MF	7	(Spain) Nieto
FW	11	(Spain) Arturo		(substituted in) 62'
MF	14	(Spain) Raúl Bravo
DF	19	(Spain) José López Silva		(substituted in) 72'
MF	22	(Spain) Aritz López Garai		(substituted in) 38'
DF	33	(Spain) Eduard Campabadal
Manager:
(Spain) Albert Ferrer

GK	1	(Argentina) Mariano Barbosa
DF	6	(Spain) Ángel
DF	16	(Spain) Aythami
DF	15	(Spain) Deivid
DF	20	(Spain) Xabi Castillo
MF	18	(Spain) Javi Castellano
MF	11	(Spain) Momo
MF	10	(Spain) Apoño
MF	7	(Spain) Nauzet Alemán	(substituted off) 79'
MF	4	(Spain) Vicente Gómez	(substituted off) 62'
FW	25	(Spain) Carlos Aranda	(substituted off) 72'
Substitutions:
GK	13	(Spain) Raúl Lizoain
DF	5	(Spain) David García
FW	9	(Nigeria) Macauley Chrisantus	(substituted in) 72'
MF	14	(Spain) Hernán Santana
MF	21	(Spain) Juan Carlos Valerón	(substituted in) 62'
FW	24	(Spain) Tana
FW	27	(Spain) Asdrúbal	(substituted in) 79'
Manager:
(Spain) Josico

==== Second leg ====
22 June 2014
18:00 CEST

Las Palmas	1–1	Córdoba
Apoño 48'	Report	Dávila 90+3'

Gran Canaria, Las Palmas de Gran Canaria
Attendance: 31,240
Referee: José María Sánchez Martínez

Las Palmas	Córdoba

GK	1	(Argentina) Mariano Barbosa
DF	6	(Spain) Ángel
DF	16	(Spain) Aythami	(yellow card) 15'
DF	15	(Spain) Deivid
DF	20	(Spain) Xabi Castillo	(yellow card) 44'
MF	21	(Spain) Juan Carlos Valerón		(substituted off) 64'
MF	18	(Spain) Javi Castellano
MF	11	(Spain) Momo		(substituted off) 81'
MF	10	(Spain) Apoño
MF	7	(Spain) Nauzet Alemán	(yellow card) 29'
FW	25	(Spain) Carlos Aranda		(substituted off) 72'
Substitutions:
GK	13	(Spain) Raúl Lizoain
DF	4	(Spain) Vicente Gómez		(substituted in) 64'
DF	5	(Spain) David García
FW	9	(Nigeria) Macauley Chrisantus
MF	14	(Spain) Hernán Santana		(substituted in) 81'
FW	22	(Spain) Héctor		(substituted in) 72'
FW	27	(Spain) Asdrúbal
Manager:
(Spain) Josico

GK	1	(Spain) Juan Carlos
DF	29	(Spain) Daniel Pinillos
DF	17	(Uruguay) Adrián Gunino
DF	4	(Spain) Iago Bouzón	(yellow card) 87'
DF	14	(Spain) Raúl Bravo
MF	23	(Spain) Abel
MF	22	(Spain) Aritz López Garai	(yellow card) 56'	(substituted off) 76'
MF	19	(Spain) José López Silva	(yellow card) 21'
MF	7	(Spain) Miguel Ángel Nieto		(substituted off) 46'
MF	15	(Spain) Pedro		(substituted off) 69'
FW	10	(Mexico) Ulises Dávila
Substitutions:
GK	13	(Spain) Mikel Saizar
DF	5	(Spain) Fran Cruz
FW	9	(Spain) Xisco		(substituted in) 69'
FW	11	(Spain) Arturo		(substituted in) 46'
MF	20	(Spain) Juanlu
MF	24	(Spain) Pelayo	(yellow card) 83'	(substituted off) 76'
DF	33	(Spain) Eduard Campabadal
Manager:
(Spain) Albert Ferrer
