= Guillermo Donoso =

Guillermo Donoso may refer to:

- Guillermo Donoso Grez (1879–1949), Chilean lawyer and politician, father of:
- Guillermo Donoso Vergara (1915–1996), Chilean lawyer and politician
- Guille Donoso (born 1995), Spanish footballer
