= Javier Velayos =

Spanish footballer

Personal information
- Full name: Javier Velayos Rodríguez
- Date of birth: 6 April 1987 (age 39)
- Place of birth: Madrid, Spain
- Height: 1.78 m (5 ft 10 in)
- Position: Right back

Youth career
- 1997–2006: Real Madrid

Senior career*
Years	Team	Apps	(Gls)
2006–2007	Real Madrid C		
2007–2010	Real Madrid B	86	(2)
2010–2011	Getafe B	23	(2)
2011–2013	Brașov	52	(0)
2013–2016	CFR Cluj	10	(0)
2014–2016	→ ASA Târgu Mureș (loan)	24	(0)
2016–2017	Racing Ferrol	10	(0)
2017	ASA Târgu Mureș	18	(0)
- * Club domestic league appearances and goals as of 27 June 2017

Javier Velayos Rodríguez (born 6 April 1987) is a Spanish footballer who plays as a right back.

== Club career ==
=== Early years ===
Born in Madrid, Velayos arrived in Real Madrid's youth system at the age of ten. In 2006, he helped the Juvenil team win the Champions Cup of the category, appearing in 34 games and playing alongside Alberto Lora.

Velayos made his senior debut in the 2006–07 season, playing nine Segunda División matches for Real Madrid Castilla as the reserves were relegated. His first appearance as a professional took place on 14 January 2007, as he came on as a second-half substitute in a 0–1 away loss against UD Almería.

In the summer of 2010, Velayos joined Getafe CF's reserves, competing in Segunda División B and helping the team retain their newly found division status.

=== Romania ===
On 28 July 2011, Velayos signed a two-year contract – with an option for a third – with Romanian club FC Brașov. In the 2013 off-season he moved teams but stayed in Liga I, joining CFR Cluj.
