= Ricardo León =

Spanish footballer

Ricardo
Personal information
- Full name: Ricardo León Brito
- Date of birth: 8 February 1983 (age 43)
- Place of birth: Santa Cruz de Tenerife, Spain
- Height: 1.86 m (6 ft 1 in)
- Position: Midfielder

Youth career
- Longuera-Toscal
- 2000–2002: Tenerife
- 2001–2002: → Orotava (loan)

Senior career*
| Years | Team | Apps | (Gls) |
| 2002–2005 | Tenerife B | | |
| 2005–2011 | Tenerife | 164 | (4) |
| 2011–2013 | Sporting Gijón | 10 | (0) |
| 2013–2016 | Tenerife | 71 | (4) |
| Total | | 245+ | (8+) |
- * Club domestic league appearances and goals

Ricardo León Brito (born 8 February 1983), known simply as Ricardo, is a Spanish former professional footballer who played as a central midfielder.

== Career ==
Born in Santa Cruz de Tenerife, Ricardo made his professional debut with local club CD Tenerife in 2005–06's Segunda División, and achieved La Liga promotion in his fourth year, being essential to this achievement. In his first season in the top flight, he appeared in 29 games (all starts, two goals) but his team was immediately relegated.

On 16 June 2011, with the Canary Islands side relegated to Segunda División B, Ricardo signed a three-year contract with Sporting de Gijón. He played just three league matches in his debut campaign, with another relegation befalling.

Ricardo returned to Tenerife in summer 2013, as a free agent. He scored the first goal of his second spell on 24 November that year, through a penalty in a 2–1 home win against Real Jaén.
