= Alberto Carbonell =

Spanish footballer (born 1993)

Personal information
- Full name: Alberto Carbonell Gomariz
- Date of birth: 25 January 1993 (age 33)
- Place of birth: San Vicente, Spain
- Height: 1.84 m (6 ft 1/2 in)
- Position: Centre back

Team information
- Current team: Jove Español

Youth career
- 2000–2003: Español San Vicente
- 2003–2012: Hércules

Senior career*
Years	Team	Apps	(Gls)
2012–2013	Hércules B	22	(0)
2013–2014	Jove Español	15	(0)
2013–2014	Hércules	8	(0)
2014–2016	Getafe B	49	(1)
2016–2017	Novelda	7	(0)
2017	Eldense	15	(2)
2017–2018	Lealtad	14	(0)
2018–2019	Cacereño	15	(0)
2019–	Jove Español	6	(0)
- * Club domestic league appearances and goals as of 21 December 2019

Alberto Carbonell Gomariz (born 25 January 1993) is a Spanish footballer who plays as a central defender for FC Jove Español San Vicente.

== Club career ==
Born in San Vicente del Raspeig, Valencian Community, Carbonell finished his development with Hércules CF, and made his debut as a senior with the reserves in the regional leagues. In August 2013 he was assigned to FC Jove Español San Vicente, the farm team competing in Tercera División.

On 14 December 2013, Carbonell played his first official game with Hércules' main squad, featuring the full 90 minutes in a 2–0 away win against AD Alcorcón in the Segunda División. He appeared in eight matches during the season, as his team were relegated.

On 13 August 2014, Carbonell terminated his contract with Hércules and moved to Getafe CF B of Segunda División B. He continued to compete in the lower leagues and amateur football in the following years, representing in quick succession Novelda CF, CD Eldense, CD Lealtad, CP Cacereño and Jove Español.
