= Álvaro Tierno =

Spanish footballer

Personal information
- Full name: Álvaro Tierno Román
- Date of birth: 30 October 1992 (age 34)
- Place of birth: Zaragoza, Spain
- Height: 1.78 m (5 ft 10 in)
- Position: Midfielder

Youth career
- Zaragoza

Senior career*
Years	Team	Apps	(Gls)
2011–2012	Universidad Zaragoza		(0)
2012–2013	Sariñena	33	(2)
2013–2015	Zaragoza B	38	(10)
2014–2015	Zaragoza	5	(0)
2015–2016	Ebro	15	(6)
2016–2017	Tarazona	6	(2)
- * Club domestic league appearances and goals as of 13 May 2026

Álvaro Tierno Román (born 30 October 1992) is a Spanish footballer who plays for SD Tarazona as a midfielder.

== Football career ==
Born in Zaragoza, Tierno graduated from local Real Zaragoza's youth setup, and made his senior debuts with the farm team, CD Universidad de Zaragoza. In July 2012 he joined CD Sariñena of the Tercera División.

Tierno returned to the Aragonese side in the 2013 summer, being assigned to the reserves also of the fourth level. On 17 May 2014 he played his first match as a professional, starting and playing the full 90 minutes of a 2–2 home draw against CE Sabadell FC in the Segunda División.
