= Roberto Canella =

Spanish footballer (born 1988)

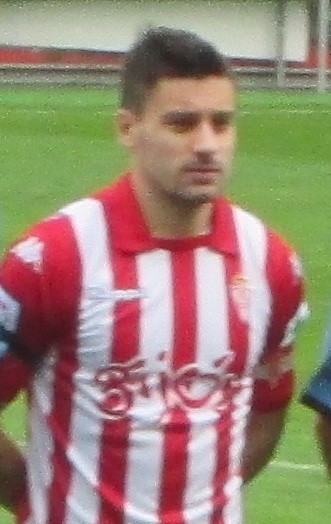
- Canella with Sporting Gijón in 2014

Personal information
- Full name: Roberto Canella Suárez
- Date of birth: 7 February 1988 (age 38)
- Place of birth: Laviana, Spain
- Height: 1.79 m (5 ft 10 1/2 in)
- Position: Left-back

Youth career
- 1995–1999: ACD Alcava
- 1999–2005: Sporting Gijón

Senior career*
Years	Team	Apps	(Gls)
2005–2006	Sporting Gijón B	16	(0)
2006–2019	Sporting Gijón	305	(8)
2014–2015	→ Deportivo La Coruña (loan)	9	(0)
2019–2022	Lugo	72	(0)
2022–2023	Calahorra	12	(0)
2023	Marino	1	(0)
Total		415	(8)

International career
2006–2007	Spain U19	5	(0)
2007	Spain U20	3	(0)
2008–2010	Spain U21	11	(0)
- * Club domestic league appearances and goals

Roberto Canella Suárez (born 7 February 1988) is a Spanish former professional footballer who played as a left-back.

He spent most of his career with Sporting de Gijón since making his debut with the first team at the age of 18, going on to appear in 313 official matches. Of those, 129 were in La Liga (four goals).

Canella represented Spain at under-19, under-20 and under-21 levels.

== Club career ==
=== Sporting Gijón ===
Canella was born in Laviana, Asturias. A product of Sporting de Gijón's cantera he first appeared with the main squad during 2006–07, and established himself as first choice the following season as they returned to La Liga after a ten-year hiatus.

Canella scored his first top-flight goal on 5 October 2008 in a 2–0 away win against RCD Mallorca, being a starter throughout the campaign. According to Cadena COPE, Real Madrid was likely to acquire his services for 2009–10. Eventually nothing came of it, and the player again occupied the left-back position for the vast majority of the season, with Sporting again retaining their league status.

In the following years, Canella continued battling for position with another club youth graduate, José Ángel, with both players appearing in roughly the same number of matches. In 2011–12, following the latter's departure to AS Roma, he became the starter for the Manuel Preciado-led side.

On 27 June 2014, Canella was loaned to Deportivo de La Coruña, recently returned to the top tier. On 22 June 2019, the 31-year-old left Sporting after spending 20 years at the club and playing more than 300 competitive games for them.

=== Later career ===
On 27 July 2019, free agent Canella signed a two-year deal with CD Lugo of Segunda División. Three years later, the 34-year-old joined Primera Federación team CD Calahorra.

Canella moved to Marino de Luanco of Segunda Federación on 20 June 2023, reuniting with his former Sporting teammates Alberto Lora and Sergio Sánchez (manager). In October, he announced his retirement due to injuries.

== International career ==
Internationally, Canella helped Spain to win the 2006 UEFA European Under-19 Championship, played at the 2007 FIFA U-20 World Cup still being under-19 and then moved to the under-21s.

== Honours ==
Spain U19

- UEFA European Under-19 Championship: 2006
