= Álex Barrera =

Spanish footballer

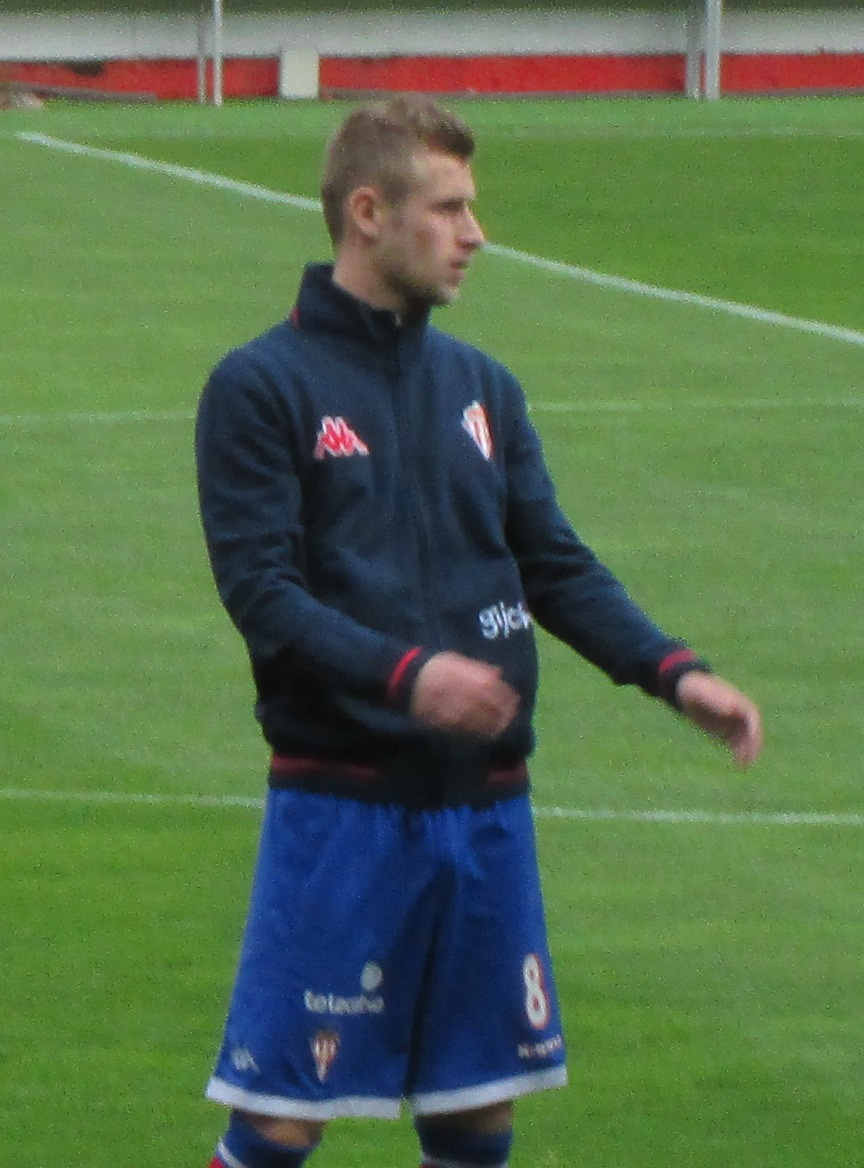
- Barrera warming up for Sporting Gijón in 2014

Personal information
- Full name: Alejandro Barrera García
- Date of birth: 12 May 1991 (age 35)
- Place of birth: Oviedo, Spain
- Height: 1.90 m (6 ft 3 in)
- Position: Midfielder

Youth career
- 1998–2010: Sporting Gijón

Senior career*
| Years | Team | Apps | (Gls) |
| 2010–2013 | Sporting Gijón B | 76 | (7) |
| 2012–2016 | Sporting Gijón | 66 | (4) |
| 2016–2017 | Zaragoza | 15 | (0) |
| 2017–2019 | Extremadura | 38 | (2) |
| 2019 | Bengaluru | 3 | (0) |
| 2020 | Barakaldo | 6 | (0) |
| 2020–2021 | Atlético Baleares | 7 | (0) |
| 2021 | Algeciras | 13 | (0) |
| 2022 | Ryukyu | 1 | (0) |
| 2023 | Calahorra | 2 | (0) |
| 2023–2024 | Coruxo | 13 | (0) |
| 2024–2025 | Llanera | 22 | (1) |
- * Club domestic league appearances and goals as of 12:08, 13 May 2025 (UTC)

Alejandro "Álex" Barrera García (born 12 May 1991) is a Spanish professional footballer who plays as a central midfielder.

== Club career ==
Born in Oviedo, Asturias, Barrera joined neighbouring Sporting de Gijón's youth academy in 1998, aged seven. He made his senior debut with the reserve team on 21 March 2010 against CD Toledo, and went on to be a regular starter for the reserves in the following Segunda División B seasons.

On 19 August 2012, Barrera made his first official appearance with the main squad, starting in a 2–0 defeat at CD Numancia in the Segunda División. In March 2013, he renewed his contract with Sporting until 2016.

Barrera scored his first competitive goal on 1 September 2013, the second in a 3–0 home win over RCD Mallorca. He contributed 11 matches – four starts – and one goal in the 2014–15 campaign, as the club returned to La Liga after a three-year absence; his maiden appearance in the competition took place on 30 December 2015, when he came on as a late substitute in the 2–0 away loss to SD Eibar.

On 11 July 2016, Barrera signed a two-year contract with Real Zaragoza of the second division. On 31 August of the following year, after being sparingly used, he moved to division three side Extremadura UD, helping achieve a first-ever promotion to the former tier in 2018.

Barrera equalised a 1–1 away draw against Real Oviedo on 19 August 2018, scoring Extremadura's maiden goal in the second division. The following 31 January, however, he terminated his contract with the club.

== Honours ==
Bengaluru

- Indian Super League: 2018–19
