= Bernardo Espinosa =

Colombian footballer (born 1989)

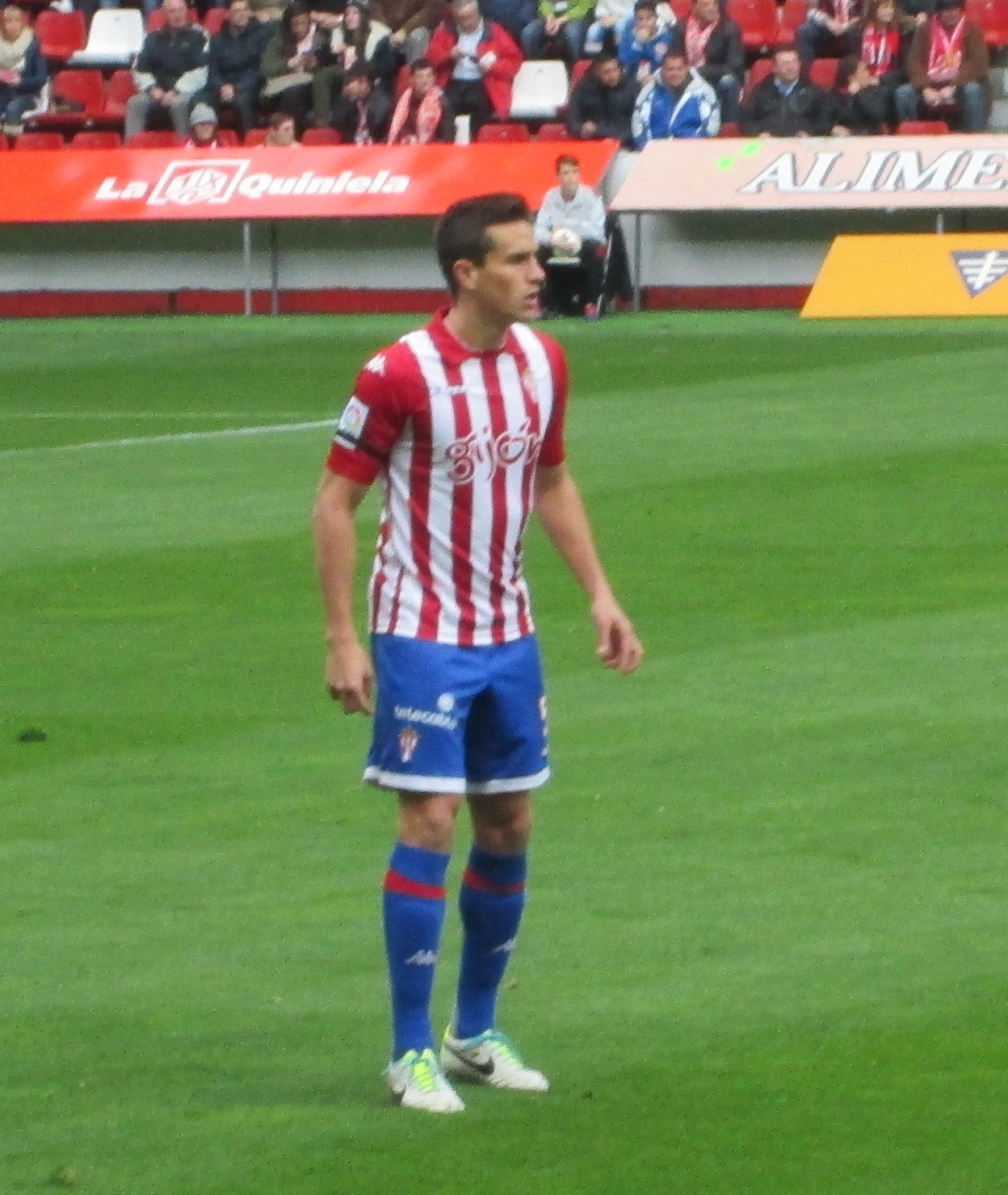
- Bernardo with Sporting Gijón in 2014

Personal information
- Full name: Bernardo José Espinosa Zúñiga
- Date of birth: 11 July 1989 (age 37)
- Place of birth: Cali, Colombia
- Height: 1.92 m (6 ft 4 in)
- Position: Centre-back

Youth career
- CD Chapas
- AD Vázquez-Cultural
- 2005–2006: Dos Hermanas San Andrés
- 2006–2008: Sevilla

Senior career*
Years	Team	Apps	(Gls)
2008–2011	Sevilla B	75	(1)
2011–2013	Sevilla	1	(0)
2011–2012	→ Racing Santander (loan)	25	(2)
2013	→ Sporting Gijón (loan)	22	(2)
2013–2016	Sporting Gijón	95	(6)
2016–2017	Middlesbrough	11	(0)
2017–2023	Girona	157	(7)
2019–2020	→ Espanyol (loan)	26	(3)
2024	Atlético Nacional	9	(1)
2024–2025	Marbella	23	(0)
Total		444	(22)
- * Club domestic league appearances and goals

Bernardo José Espinosa Zúñiga (Spanish pronunciation: [beɾˈnaɾðo espiˈnosa]; born 11 July 1989) is a Colombian former professional footballer who played as a central defender. He is the general manager of Primera Federación club Marbella.

== Club career ==
=== Sevilla ===
Born in Cali to a Colombian father and a Spanish mother, Espinosa and his family moved to Marbella when he was 10 and he finished his youth career in the country with Sevilla FC. After appearing in one match for the reserves in 2007–08 (five minutes) he proceeded to spend a further three full seasons with them, one in the Segunda División and two in the Segunda División B, only starting regularly in his last.

Espinosa made his first-team – and La Liga – debut on 11 May 2011, playing 90 minutes in a 3–2 away loss against CA Osasuna. In the ensuing summer, he was loaned to Racing de Santander in a season-long move.

Espinosa scored his first top-flight goal for the Cantabrians on 7 January 2012, heading home the game's only in a home win against Real Zaragoza.

=== Sporting Gijón ===
On 26 December 2012, after not featuring at all for Sevilla in the first half of the campaign, Espinosa was loaned to Sporting de Gijón in the second division. The following 26 June he signed a permanent three-year contract, scoring three goals while only missing one game in 42 in the 2014–15 campaign to help the Asturians to return to the top tier after three years.

Espinosa missed the second part of 2015–16, due to a serious knee injury.

=== Middlesbrough ===
On 15 June 2016, at the expiration of his contract, Espinosa joined newly promoted Premier League side Middlesbrough on a three-year deal. Still recovering from his anterior cruciate ligament ailment when he arrived, he gained regular playing time during the second half of the season, being third choice in his position behind Calum Chambers and Ben Gibson.

=== Girona ===
On 7 July 2017, after being relegated, Espinosa signed with Girona FC for an undisclosed fee. He was an undisputed starter during his two seasons at the club, suffering relegation at the end of his second.

Espinosa was loaned to RCD Espanyol of the top division on 6 July 2019, with a buyout clause. He scored his first competitive goal on 27 October, the only in an away victory over Levante UD.

Espinosa left the Estadi Montilivi in December 2023, aged 34 and with 174 official appearances to his credit.

=== Atlético Nacional ===
On 5 January 2024, Espinosa returned to Colombia after more than two decades, joining Atlético Nacional of the Categoría Primera A. He scored his first goal in his country on 28 January, but in a 4–1 defeat at América de Cali.

== International career ==
In November 2015, Espinosa was named in Colombia's squad for a 2018 FIFA World Cup qualifier against Argentina, but eventually did not make his debut. He was called up again in March 2018, for friendlies with France and Australia.

Espinosa was named in a preliminary 35-man squad for the finals in Russia, but he did not make the final cut.

== Post-retirement ==
Espinosa retired in June 2025 aged 36, following a season in the Spanish Primera Federación with Marbella FC. He immediately became his last club's general manager.

== Career statistics ==
As of match played 30 May 2021

Appearances and goals by club, season and competition
Club	Season	League			National Cup		League Cup		Other		Total	
Club	Season	Division	Apps	Goals	Apps	Goals	Apps	Goals	Apps	Goals	Apps	Goals
Sevilla B	2007–08	Segunda División	1	0	—		—		—		1	0
Sevilla B	2008–09	Segunda División	15	0	—		—		—		15	0
Sevilla B	2009–10	Segunda División B	24	0	—		—		—		24	0
Sevilla B	2010–11	Segunda División B	35	1	—		—		4 (Note: Appearances in Segunda División B play-offs)	0	39	1
Sevilla B	Total		75	1	—		—		4	0	79	1
Sevilla	2010–11	La Liga	1	0	1	1	—		0	0	2	1
Racing Santander (loan)	2011–12	La Liga	25	2	1	0	—		—		26	2
Sporting Gijón	2012–13	Segunda División	22	2	0	0	—		—		22	2
Sporting Gijón	2013–14	Segunda División	38	2	0	0	—		2 (Note: Appearances in La Liga play-offs)	0	40	2
Sporting Gijón	2014–15	Segunda División	41	3	0	0	—		—		41	3
Sporting Gijón	2015–16	La Liga	16	1	1	1	—		—		17	2
Sporting Gijón	Total		117	8	1	1	—		2	0	120	9
Middlesbrough	2016–17	Premier League	11	0	4	0	0	0	—		15	0
Middlesbrough U23	2016–17	Professional Development League	—		—		—		1 (Note: Appearance in EFL Trophy)	0	1	0
Girona	2017–18	La Liga	34	0	1	0	—		—		35	0
Girona	2018–19	La Liga	31	1	6	0	—		—		37	1
Girona	2020–21	Segunda División	31	2	1	0	—		—		32	2
Girona	Total		96	3	8	0	0	0	0	0	104	3
Espanyol (loan)	2019–20	La Liga	26	3	1	0	—		—		27	3
Career total			351	17	16	2	0	0	7	0	374	19

== Honours ==
Individual

- Segunda División Best Defender: 2014–15
