= Xabi Castillo =

Spanish footballer (born 1986)

Personal information
- Full name: Xabier Castillo Aranburu
- Date of birth: 29 March 1986 (age 40)
- Place of birth: Durango, Spain
- Height: 1.84 m (6 ft 0 in)
- Position: Left-back

Youth career
- 1995–1996: Ikastola Maiztegi
- 1996–2001: Athletic Bilbao
- 2001–2003: Durango
- 2003–2004: Real Sociedad

Senior career*
Years	Team	Apps	(Gls)
2004–2006	Real Sociedad B	55	(2)
2006–2009	Real Sociedad	71	(1)
2006–2007	→ Las Palmas (loan)	31	(0)
2009–2013	Athletic Bilbao	37	(0)
2013–2014	Las Palmas	27	(0)
2014–2015	Alavés	13	(0)
Total		234	(3)

International career
2005	Spain U19	1	(0)
- * Club domestic league appearances and goals

Xabier 'Xabi' Castillo Aranburu (born 29 March 1986) is a Spanish former professional footballer who played as a left-back.

== Club career ==
Born in Durango, Biscay, Castillo came up through the ranks at Athletic Bilbao, but made his senior debut with Basque neighbours Real Sociedad, where he had finished his football development. His first professional experience came with UD Las Palmas on loan, in 2006–07's Segunda División. In his first two seasons with Real Sociedad's first team he was first choice, in the same level.

On 15 July 2009, Castillo returned his first alma mater and signed a four-year deal. He made his La Liga debut in the campaign opener (30 August 2009), a 1–0 home win against RCD Espanyol, and made a total of 45 competitive appearances in his first two years.

Castillo spent the entire 2011–12 on the sidelines, due to a patellar ligament injury. Upon returning he was only a fringe player, being released by the Marcelo Bielsa-led squad in June 2013 after his contract expired and returning to former club Las Palmas.

On 10 July 2014, Castillo joined Deportivo Alavés also of the second tier.
