= Aritz López Garai =

Spanish footballer (born 1980)

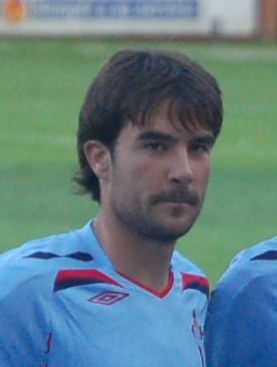
- López Garai as a Celta player in 2009

Personal information
- Full name: Aritz López Garai
- Date of birth: 6 November 1980 (age 45)
- Place of birth: Barakaldo, Spain
- Height: 1.82 m (6 ft 0 in)
- Position: Midfielder

Team information
- Current team: Mauritania (manager)

Youth career
- 1997–1998: Indartsu
- 1998–1999: Athletic Bilbao

Senior career*
Years	Team	Apps	(Gls)
1999–2002	Basconia	68	(5)
2001–2002	→ Gernika (loan)	33	(0)
2002–2005	Conquense	103	(2)
2005–2007	Salamanca	73	(4)
2007–2009	Castellón	75	(4)
2009–2011	Celta	76	(1)
2011–2013	Córdoba	80	(6)
2013–2014	Sporting Gijón	14	(0)
2014	→ Córdoba (loan)	6	(0)
2014	Córdoba	6	(0)
2015	Rapid București	17	(0)
2015	Doxa	13	(0)
2016–2017	Reus	52	(1)
Total		616	(23)

Managerial career
- 2017–2018: Reus
- 2018–2019: Numancia
- 2019: Tenerife
- 2020: Albacete
- 2023–2024: Nouadhibou
- 2024: Mauritania U20
- 2024–: Mauritania
- * Club domestic league appearances and goals

Aritz López Garai (born 6 November 1980) is a Spanish former professional footballer who played as a central midfielder, currently manager of the Mauritania national team.

He amassed Segunda División totals of 325 matches and 13 goals over nine seasons, in representation of six clubs. In La Liga, he played six games with Córdoba.

In 2017, López Garai started working as a manager.

== Playing career ==
López Garai was born in Barakaldo, Biscay. An unsuccessful youth graduate of Athletic Bilbao, he spent the vast majority of his professional career in the second and third divisions.

López Garai represented CD Basconia (Bilbao's farm team), Gernika Club, UB Conquense, UD Salamanca, CD Castellón, RC Celta de Vigo, Córdoba CF – two spells – and Sporting de Gijón, rarely settling with a team but being always first choice. He signed with Andalusia's Córdoba for the second time in summer 2014 following a short loan spell with the same club from Gijón, and made his La Liga debut on 25 August 2014 at the age of 33, starting in a 2–0 away loss against Real Madrid.

On 28 January 2015, López Garai terminated his contract. Less than one month later, he moved abroad for the first time in his career, joining Romania's FC Rapid București.

== Coaching career ==
For the 2015–16 campaign, López Garai represented Doxa Katokopias FC in Cyprus and CF Reus Deportiu, achieving promotion to the second division with the latter side. On 15 June 2017, they announced the 36-year-old would retire and become its head coach with immediate effect, replacing Real Zaragoza-bound Natxo González.

On 24 June 2018, López Garai was appointed manager of CD Numancia after terminating his contract with Reus. He signed a new deal with the former club the following 19 February, but reached an agreement to leave on 11 June.

On 21 June 2019, López Garai was named at the helm of CD Tenerife still in the second tier. On 17 November, he was dismissed.

López Garai took over Albacete Balompié of the same league on 14 October 2020 after nearly one year of inactivity, replacing the fired Lucas Alcaraz. He was himself relieved of his duties on 6 December, after only winning three points out of the last 27.

In February 2023, López Garai moved to Mauritania to become head coach of FC Nouadhibou. He won the Super D1 in each of his two seasons, and also led them to a first-ever qualification for the group stage of the CAF Champions League.

Remaining in Mauritania, López Garai was appointed at the under-20 national team on 22 February 2024. Exactly nine months later, he replaced Amir Abdou at the full side following failure to qualify for the 2025 Africa Cup of Nations.

== Career statistics ==
Club	Season	League			Cup		Other		Total	
Club	Season	Division	Apps	Goals	Apps	Goals	Apps	Goals	Apps	Goals
Basconia	1999–00	Tercera División	31	3	—		—		31	3
Basconia	2000–01	Segunda División B	37	2	—		—		37	2
Basconia	Total		68	5	—		—		68	5
Gernika	2001–02	Segunda División B	33	0	—		—		33	0
Conquense	2002–03	Segunda División B	34	1	—		—		34	1
Conquense	2003–04	Segunda División B	32	1	3	0	—		35	1
Conquense	2004–05	Segunda División B	37	0	3	0	4 (Note: Appearances in promotion play-offs)	0	44	0
Conquense	Total		103	2	6	0	4	0	113	2
Salamanca	2005–06	Segunda División B	36	2	1	0	4	0	41	2
Salamanca	2006–07	Segunda División	37	2	1	0	—		38	2
Salamanca	Total		73	4	2	0	4	0	79	4
Castellón	2007–08	Segunda División	39	4	0	0	—		39	2
Castellón	2008–09	Segunda División	36	0	1	0	—		37	0
Castellón	Total		75	4	1	0	—		76	4
Celta	2009–10	Segunda División	40	1	6	0	—		46	1
Celta	2010–11	Segunda División	36	0	1	0	2	0	39	0
Celta	Total		76	1	7	0	2	0	85	1
Córdoba	2011–12	Segunda División	39	0	4	0	2	0	45	0
Córdoba	2012–13	Segunda División	41	6	6	0	—		47	6
Córdoba	Total		80	6	10	0	2	0	92	6
Sporting Gijón	2013–14	Segunda División	14	0	0	0	—		14	0
Córdoba (loan)	2013–14	Segunda División	6	0	0	0	3	0	9	0
Córdoba (loan)	2014–15	La Liga	6	0	2	0	—		8	0
Córdoba (loan)	Total		12	0	2	0	3	0	17	0
Rapid București	2014–15	Liga I	17	0	0	0	—		17	0
Doxa	2015–16	Cypriot First Division	13	0	0	0	—		13	0
Reus	2015–16	Segunda División B	15	0	0	0	4	0	19	0
Reus	2016–17	Segunda División	37	1	0	0	—		37	1
Reus	Total		52	1	2	0	0	0	56	1
Career total			616	23	28	0	19	0	663	38

== Managerial statistics ==
As of 6 December 2020

Managerial record by team and tenure
Team	Nat	From	To	Record								Ref
Team	Nat	From	To	G	W	D	L	GF	GA	GD	Win %	Ref
Reus	(Spain)	15 June 2017	23 June 2018	41	11	15	15	29	42	−13	26.83	
Numancia	(Spain)	24 June 2018	11 June 2019	43	11	16	16	45	52	−7	25.58	
Tenerife	(Spain)	21 June 2019	17 November 2019	16	3	6	7	18	21	−3	18.75	
Albacete	(Spain)	14 October 2020	6 December 2020	12	2	4	6	8	14	−6	16.67	
Nouadhibou	(Mauritania)	February 2023	22 November 2024	56	38	13	5	85	27	+58	67.86	
Mauritania	(Mauritania)	22 November 2024	present	11	1	5	5	6	14	−8	9.09	
Total				112	27	41	44	100	129	−29	24.11	—
