= Alberto Lora =

Spanish footballer (born 1987)

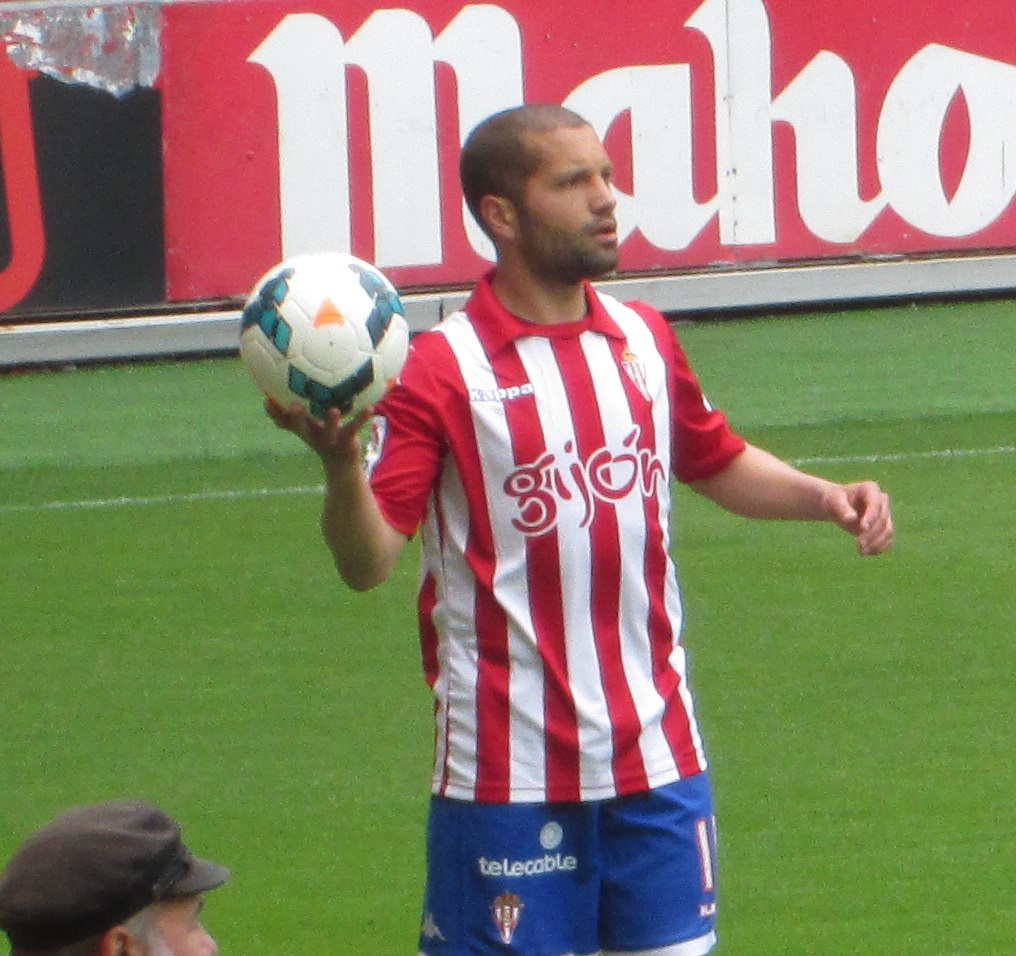
- Lora in action for Sporting Gijón (2014)

Personal information
- Full name: Alberto Lora Ramos
- Date of birth: 25 March 1987 (age 39)
- Place of birth: Móstoles, Spain
- Height: 1.64 m (5 ft 5 in)
- Position: Right-back

Team information
- Current team: Marino
- Number: 11

Youth career
- 1998–1999: Móstoles
- 1999–2006: Real Madrid

Senior career*
Years	Team	Apps	(Gls)
2006–2009	Sporting Gijón B	76	(8)
2007–2018	Sporting Gijón	255	(5)
2018–2019	Omonia	16	(0)
2019–	Marino	189	(16)
- * Club domestic league appearances and goals as of 23:42, 28 May 2026 (UTC)

Alberto Lora Ramos (born 25 March 1987) is a Spanish professional footballer who plays as a right-back for Marino de Luanco.

He spent most of his career with Sporting de Gijón, playing 267 matches across all competitions after signing in 2006.

== Club career ==
=== Sporting Gijón ===
Lora was born in Móstoles, Community of Madrid. A Real Madrid trainee, he served as co-captain for the Juvenil team in the 2005–06 season alongside Javier Velayos, and played 33 games as the club won the Champions Cup of the category. He started his career as a midfielder.

The following summer, Lora signed for Sporting de Gijón. Mainly registered with their reserves, he played once with the main squad during the 2007–08 campaign (a 0–1 home loss against RC Celta de Vigo), as the Asturians eventually returned from Segunda División after ten years.

In 2009–10, due to longtime starter Rafel Sastre's age, Lora was successfully converted into a right-back. He ended up as the undisputed first choice in that position, playing nearly 2,800 minutes as Sporting avoided La Liga relegation as 15th. The following season, his individual numbers were even better – he was the player with more minutes in the squad, leading the following player by nearly 700 minutes – as the team's final position.

On 25 March 2012, the day of his 25th birthday, Lora scored his first goal as a professional, in the last-minute to earn his side a point against Athletic Bilbao, in a 1–1 away draw. He rarely missed a match from 2012 to 2016, with the latter campaign being spent in the top flight.

Lora announced his departure from Sporting on 12 June 2018, after 12 years at the El Molinón.

=== Later career ===
On 4 September 2018, the 31-year-old Lora moved abroad for the first time in his career and joined Cypriot First Division club AC Omonia on a two-year contract. He returned to Spain in summer 2019, however, going on to spend several seasons in the lower leagues with Marino de Luanco.

== Career statistics ==
As of match played 9 May 2021

Appearances and goals by club, season and competition
Club	Season	League			National Cup		Other		Total	
Club	Season	Division	Apps	Goals	Apps	Goals	Apps	Goals	Apps	Goals
Sporting Gijón	2006–07	Segunda División	0	0	0	0	—		0	0
Sporting Gijón	2007–08	Segunda División	1	0	0	0	—		1	0
Sporting Gijón	2008–09	La Liga	8	0	2	0	—		10	0
Sporting Gijón	2009–10	La Liga	32	0	0	0	—		32	0
Sporting Gijón	2010–11	La Liga	36	0	1	0	—		37	0
Sporting Gijón	2011–12	La Liga	27	3	1	0	—		28	3
Sporting Gijón	2012–13	Segunda División	30	0	2	0	—		32	0
Sporting Gijón	2013–14	Segunda División	35	0	0	0	2 (Note: Appearances in La Liga play-offs)	0	37	0
Sporting Gijón	2014–15	Segunda División	40	1	1	0	—		41	1
Sporting Gijón	2015–16	La Liga	31	0	1	0	—		32	0
Sporting Gijón	2016–17	La Liga	7	0	0	0	—		7	0
Sporting Gijón	2017–18	Segunda División	8	1	1	0	1	0	10	1
Sporting Gijón	Total		255	5	9	0	3	0	267	5
Omonia	2018–19	Cypriot First Division	16	0	2	0	—		18	0
Marino	2019–20	Segunda División B	26	0	1	0	—		27	0
Marino	2020–21	Segunda División B	24	3	0	0	—		24	3
Marino	Total		50	3	1	0	0	0	51	3
Career total			321	8	12	0	3	0	336	8
