= José López Silva (footballer) =

Spanish footballer (born 1983)

López Silva
Personal information
- Full name: José María López de Silva Sánchez
- Date of birth: 1 February 1983 (age 43)
- Place of birth: Huelva, Spain
- Height: 1.70 m (5 ft 7 in)
- Position: Winger

Team information
- Current team: Cerreño

Youth career
- Real Madrid

Senior career*
| Years | Team | Apps | (Gls) |
| 2001–2002 | Real Madrid B | | |
| 2002–2003 | Valencia B | 0 | (0) |
| 2003–2004 | Cartaya | | |
| 2004–2005 | Linares | 28 | (0) |
| 2005–2006 | Burgos | 18 | (1) |
| 2006–2007 | Alcalá | 33 | (7) |
| 2007–2008 | Orihuela | 34 | (1) |
| 2008–2011 | Cádiz | 100 | (8) |
| 2011–2016 | Córdoba | 135 | (11) |
| 2016–2018 | Alcoyano | 58 | (2) |
| 2018–2023 | Tamaraceite | 142 | (15) |
| 2023–2025 | Trigueros | 33 | (0) |
| 2025– | Cerreño | 15 | (0) |
| Total | | 596 | (45) |
- * Club domestic league appearances and goals as of 22:28, 5 August 2026 (UTC)

José María López de Silva Sánchez (born 1 February 1983), known as López Silva, is a Spanish footballer who plays as a winger for CD Cerreño.

== Club career ==
Born in Huelva, Andalusia, López Silva joined Valencia CF after finishing his development at Real Madrid, and was part of the reserves' setup in the 2002–03 season in the Segunda División B, even though he failed to appear in any games. In the summer of 2004, he signed with CD Linares of the same league.

López Silva continued to compete in the third division the following years, representing Burgos CF, CD Alcalá, Orihuela CF and Cádiz CF. With the latter, he achieved promotion to Segunda División, contributing three goals from 32 appearances.

On 30 August 2009, aged 26, López Silva played his first match as a professional, starting in a 0–1 home loss against UD Salamanca. He scored his first goal on 8 November, his team's first in a 2–2 home draw with Real Betis.

On 15 June 2011, López Silva signed a two-year deal with Córdoba CF also in the second tier. In his third year he appeared in 40 matches and scored three times, helping the side return to La Liga after a 42-year absence.

López Silva made his debut in the Spanish top flight on 25 August 2014, starting the 2–0 defeat at Real Madrid. He left the club in June 2016, and subsequently joined CD Alcoyano of division three.

On 25 July 2018, López Silva joined Tercera División side UD Tamaraceite.
