= Mandi (footballer) =

Spanish footballer

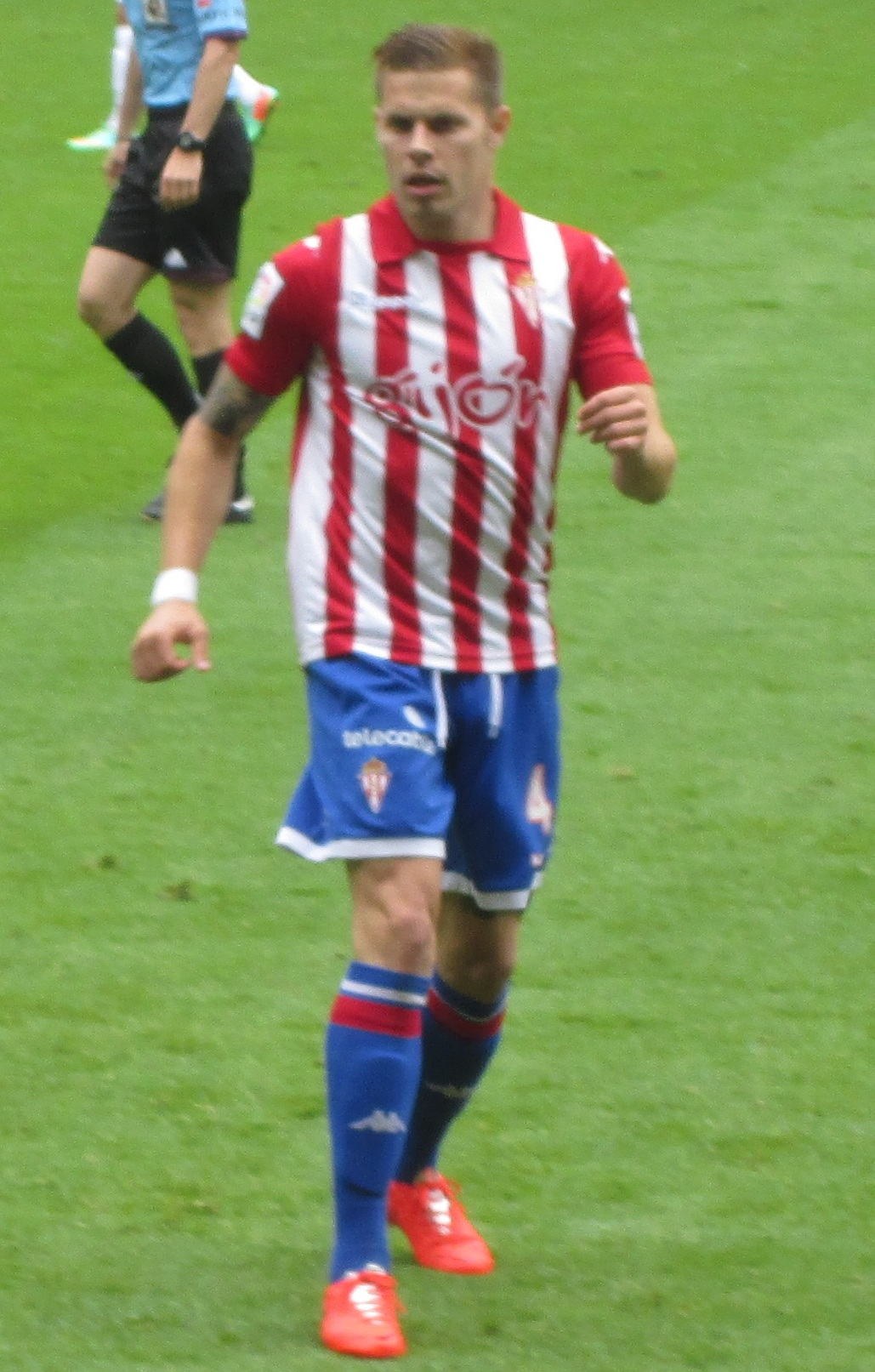
- Mandi in action for Sporting Gijón in 2014

Personal information
- Full name: Armando Sosa Peña
- Date of birth: 1 March 1989 (age 37)
- Place of birth: Santa Lucía, Spain
- Height: 1.82 m (6 ft 0 in)
- Position: Defensive midfielder

Team information
- Current team: Lincoln Red Imps
- Number: 8

Youth career
- 2000–2003: San Fernando
- 2003–2006: Maspalomas
- 2006–2007: Vecindario

Senior career*
Years	Team	Apps	(Gls)
2007–2008	Vecindario	2	(0)
2008–2010	Villarreal C	48	(4)
2008	Villarreal B	1	(0)
2010	→ Ponferradina (loan)	11	(1)
2010–2012	Real Madrid B	47	(2)
2012–2015	Sporting Gijón	66	(2)
2015–2017	Elche	37	(0)
2017–2018	Almería	23	(0)
2018–2019	Wellington Phoenix	25	(2)
2019–2020	ATK	11	(0)
2021–2022	Unionistas	34	(2)
2023–	Lincoln Red Imps	48	(4)
- * Club domestic league appearances and goals as of 17:14, 22 November 2026 (UTC)

Armando Sosa Peña (born 1 March 1989), known as Mandi, is a Spanish professional footballer who plays as a defensive midfielder for Gibraltar National League club Lincoln Red Imps.

== Club career ==
Born in Santa Lucía de Tirajana, Canary Islands, Mandi made his debut as a senior with UD Vecindario in 2007. In the summer of 2008 he moved to Villarreal CF, representing both its C and B teams.

On 2 February 2010, Mandi joined SD Ponferradina on loan until June. With the Castile and León club he was promoted to Segunda División, being regularly used during his six-month spell.

On 15 July 2010, after rejecting a new contract at Ponfe, Mandi signed for Real Madrid Castilla also in the third division. After again winning promotion to the second tier, he moved to Sporting de Gijón on 22 June 2012 after agreeing to a four-year deal.

Mandi made his professional debut on 2 September 2012, starting in a 0–0 away draw against Racing de Santander. He scored his first goal on 5 January of the following year, in a 1–1 draw at Recreativo de Huelva.

On 31 August 2015, Mandi terminated his contract with Sporting and signed for Elche CF just hours later. On 8 July 2017, after suffering relegation with the latter, he agreed to a one-year deal at UD Almería.

On 12 October 2018, Mandi signed with New Zealand club Wellington Phoenix FC. He scored his first goal in the A-League on 24 November, with a long-range half-volley to open a 3–1 home loss against Adelaide United FC.

Mandi joined Indian Super League franchise ATK on 16 December 2019, as a replacement for the injured Carl McHugh. After contributing eight starts as they were crowned champions, he returned to his country's division three with Unionistas de Salamanca CF.

== Honours ==
Real Madrid Castilla

- Segunda División B: 2011–12

ATK

- Indian Super League: 2019–20
