= Guille Donoso =

Spanish footballer

Personal information
- Full name: Guillermo Donoso Alonso
- Date of birth: 8 July 1995 (age 31)
- Place of birth: Gijón, Spain
- Height: 1.73 m (5 ft 8 in)
- Position: Winger

Youth career
- 2002–2013: Sporting Gijón

Senior career*
Years	Team	Apps	(Gls)
2013–2016	Sporting B	115	(7)
2016–2017	Córdoba	22	(1)
2017–2019	Lugo	6	(0)
2018	→ Ponferradina (loan)	15	(4)
2019	→ Ponferradina (loan)	2	(0)
2019–2020	Ponferradina	2	(0)
2020–2021	Real Unión	13	(0)
2021–2022	Palencia CF	30	(4)
2022–2023	Rayo Majadahonda	12	(0)
2023	Xerez Deportivo	14	(1)

International career
2013	Spain U19	1	(0)
- * Club domestic league appearances and goals as of 7 May 2023

Guillermo 'Guille' Donoso Alonso (born 8 July 1995) is a Spanish footballer who plays as a right winger.

== Club career ==
Donoso was born in Gijón, Asturias. A Sporting de Gijón youth graduate, he made his senior debut with the reserves on 3 February 2013, coming on as a first-half substitute in a 0–4 Segunda División B away loss against UD Salamanca.

On 14 August 2013, Donoso signed a professional three-year deal with the Rojiblancos, and scored his first senior goal on 1 September, netting the first in a 4–1 home routing of CD Tropezón. On 10 September he was called up to the main squad for a Copa del Rey match against Recreativo de Huelva, but remained unused in the 2–3 loss in the extra-time.

On 1 July 2016, after spending the rest of his spell exclusively with the B-team, Donoso signed a three-year contract with Segunda División side Córdoba CF. He made his professional debut on 20 August, coming on as a second-half substitute for goalscorer Alejandro Alfaro in a 1–0 home win against CD Tenerife.

Donoso scored his first professional goal on 17 September 2016, netting the game's only in a home success over Levante UD. The following 22 June he cut ties with the club, and signed a contract with fellow league team CD Lugo eight days later.

On 31 January 2018, Donoso joined SD Ponferradina on loan until the end of the season. He returned to Lugo in July, but after failing to make any league appearances, he rejoined Ponfe on 22 January 2019, also in a temporary deal.

On 2 July 2019, despite suffering a knee injury which shortened his contribution to the side's promotion to the second division, Donoso signed a permanent contract with the Castilian-Leonese club. After only four games for the club, his contract was terminated by mutual consent on 31 January 2020.

On 24 July 2020, Donoso signed with Real Unión.
