= Santi Jara =

Spanish footballer

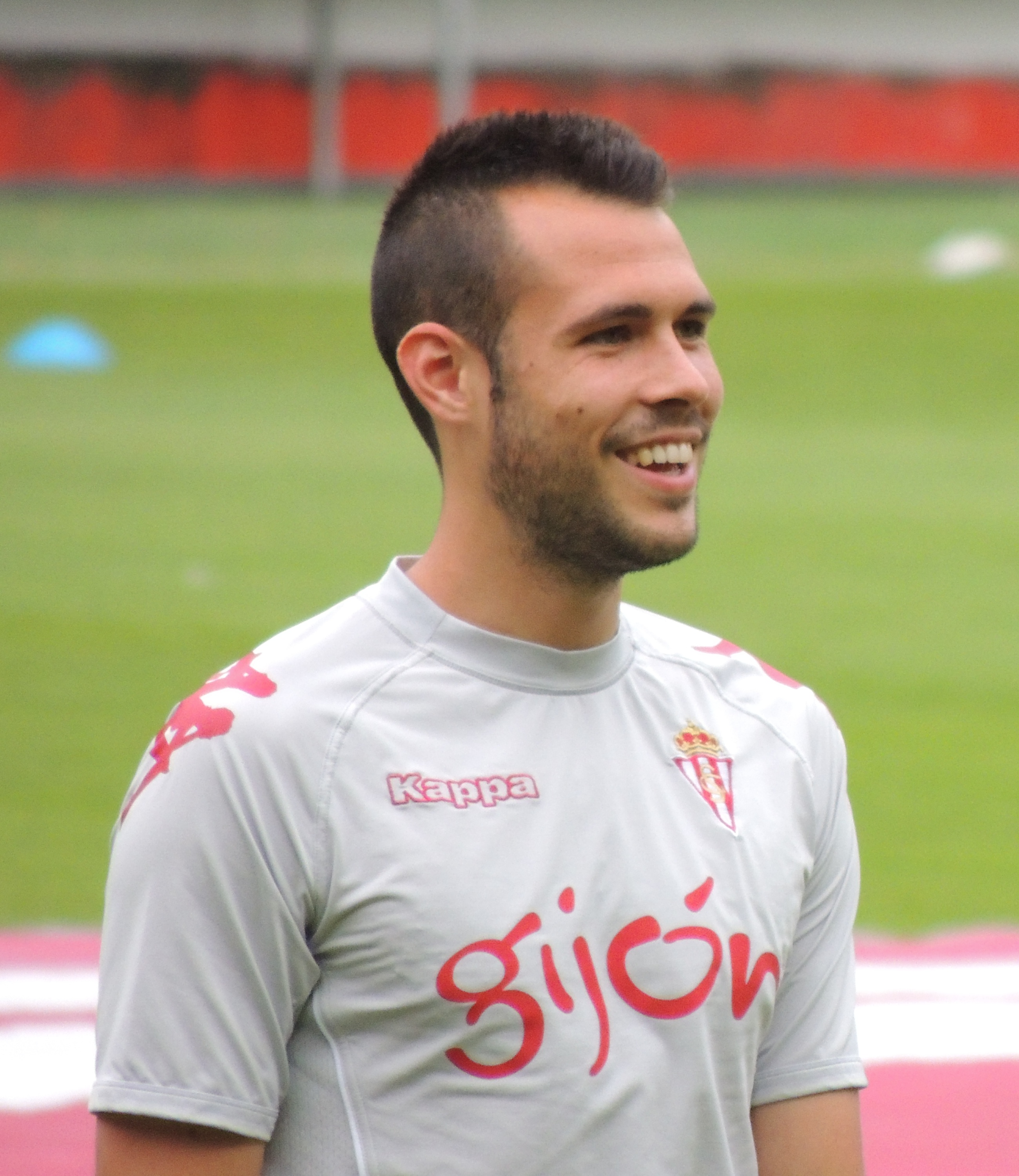
- Jara training with Sporting Gijón

Personal information
- Full name: Santiago Jara Collado
- Date of birth: 2 February 1991 (age 35)
- Place of birth: Almansa, Spain
- Height: 1.78 m (5 ft 10 in)
- Position: Winger

Youth career
- Almansa
- 2008–2009: Albacete

Senior career*
Years	Team	Apps	(Gls)
2009–2011	Almansa	53	(6)
2011–2013	Sporting Gijón B	55	(8)
2012–2015	Sporting Gijón	61	(5)
2015–2016	Albacete	24	(0)
2016	Saburtalo	13	(2)
2017	Racing Santander	16	(2)
2017–2018	Murcia	33	(4)
2018–2020	Cartagena	48	(10)
2020–2022	UCAM Murcia	32	(0)
2022–2023	Murcia	26	(3)
2023	Fuenlabrada	16	(1)
2023–2024	Linense	15	(1)
2024–2025	Manchester 62	9	(1)
2025	Minera	4	(0)
- * Club domestic league appearances and goals as of 4 May 2025

Santiago 'Santi' Jara Collado (born 2 February 1991) is a Spanish footballer who plays as a right winger.

== Club career ==
Born in Almansa, Castilla–La Mancha, Jara began his career with hometown club UD Almansa. In June 2011, he joined Sporting de Gijón, being assigned to the reserves in the Segunda División B.

Jara made his debut with the Asturians' first team on 27 November 2012, in a 2–0 away loss against CA Osasuna in the round of 32 of the Copa del Rey. He appeared in his first Segunda División game the following 2 February, playing the entire 1–2 home defeat to Racing de Santander.

On 15 March 2013, Jara renewed his contract until 2016. He scored his first goal for the main squad one day later, contributing to a 5–2 home win over FC Barcelona B.

On 22 July 2015, having started only one match during the previous season, Jara cut ties with Sporting, and joined fellow second-division Albacete Balompié two days later. After totalling 25 scoreless appearances and suffering relegation, he subsequently resumed his career in the third tier, representing Racing de Santander, Real Murcia CF, FC Cartagena, UCAM Murcia CF and CF Fuenlabrada, aside from a four-month spell at Georgia's FC Saburtalo Tbilisi.

Jara returned abroad again in August 2024, joining Manchester 62 F.C. of the Gibraltar Football League from Segunda Federación side Real Balompédica Linense.
