= Dejan Lekić =

Serbian footballer (born 1985)

Dejan Lekić Дејан Лекић
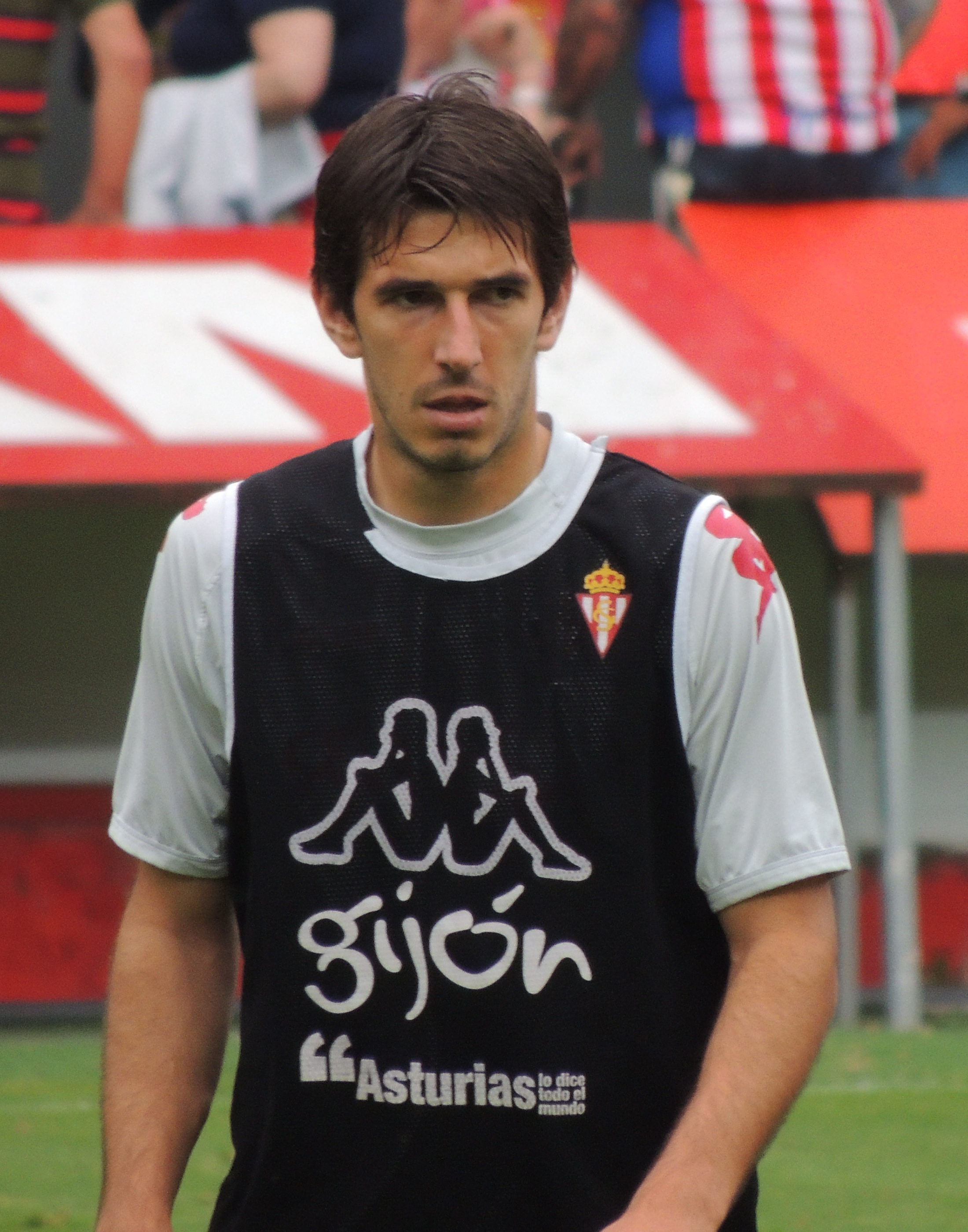
- Lekić training with Sporting de Gijón in 2014

Personal information
- Full name: Dejan Lekić
- Date of birth: 7 June 1985 (age 41)
- Place of birth: Kraljevo, SFR Yugoslavia
- Height: 1.93 m (6 ft 4 in)
- Position: Striker

Team information
- Current team: Las Rozas
- Number: 9

Youth career
- 2002–2003: Sloga Kraljevo
- 2003–2005: Popovići

Senior career*
Years	Team	Apps	(Gls)
2003–2005	Popovići	39	(14)
2005–2007	Metalac Kraljevo	39	(17)
2007–2009	Zemun	64	(34)
2009–2010	Red Star Belgrade	27	(12)
2010–2012	Osasuna	45	(6)
2012–2014	Gençlerbirliği	21	(3)
2013–2014	→ Sporting Gijón (loan)	36	(12)
2014–2015	Eibar	18	(0)
2015	Atlético de Kolkata	6	(2)
2016	Girona	17	(5)
2016–2017	Mallorca	34	(7)
2017–2018	Reus	30	(8)
2018–2019	Cádiz	29	(4)
2020	Atlético Baleares	2	(0)
2021	Las Rozas	9	(0)

International career
2009–2012	Serbia	10	(0)
- * Club domestic league appearances and goals as of 21 March 2021

Dejan Lekić (Serbian Cyrillic: Дејан Лекић; born 7 June 1985) is a Serbian former footballer who last played for Spanish club Las Rozas CF as a striker.

== Career ==
After appearing for Metalac Kraljevo and Zemun, Lekić joined Red Star Belgrade in the 2009 summer, after scoring 26 goals with Zemun in the 2008–09 campaign. He made his debut for the club on 16 July 2009, starting in a 1–0 away win against NK Rudar Velenje, for the season's UEFA Europa League.

On 6 August 2009, in a third qualifying round match against Dinamo Tbilisi, Lekić scored an own goal which gave Dinamo a two-goal margin, but later netted a hat-trick for Red Star as the club claimed their place in the play-offs.

On 25 June 2010 Lekić signed a five-year deal with La Liga side CA Osasuna, for a € 2.6 million fee. He made his debut in the competition on 29 August, coming on as a second-half substitute in a 0–0 home draw against UD Almería; he scored his first goal on 23 January of the following year, in a 2–3 away loss against the same team.

On 13 January 2012, Lekić scored a first-half goal in a 1–2 home loss against FC Barcelona for the campaign's Copa del Rey. Roughly a month later, also against the Catalans, he scored a brace in the surprising 3–2 home success.

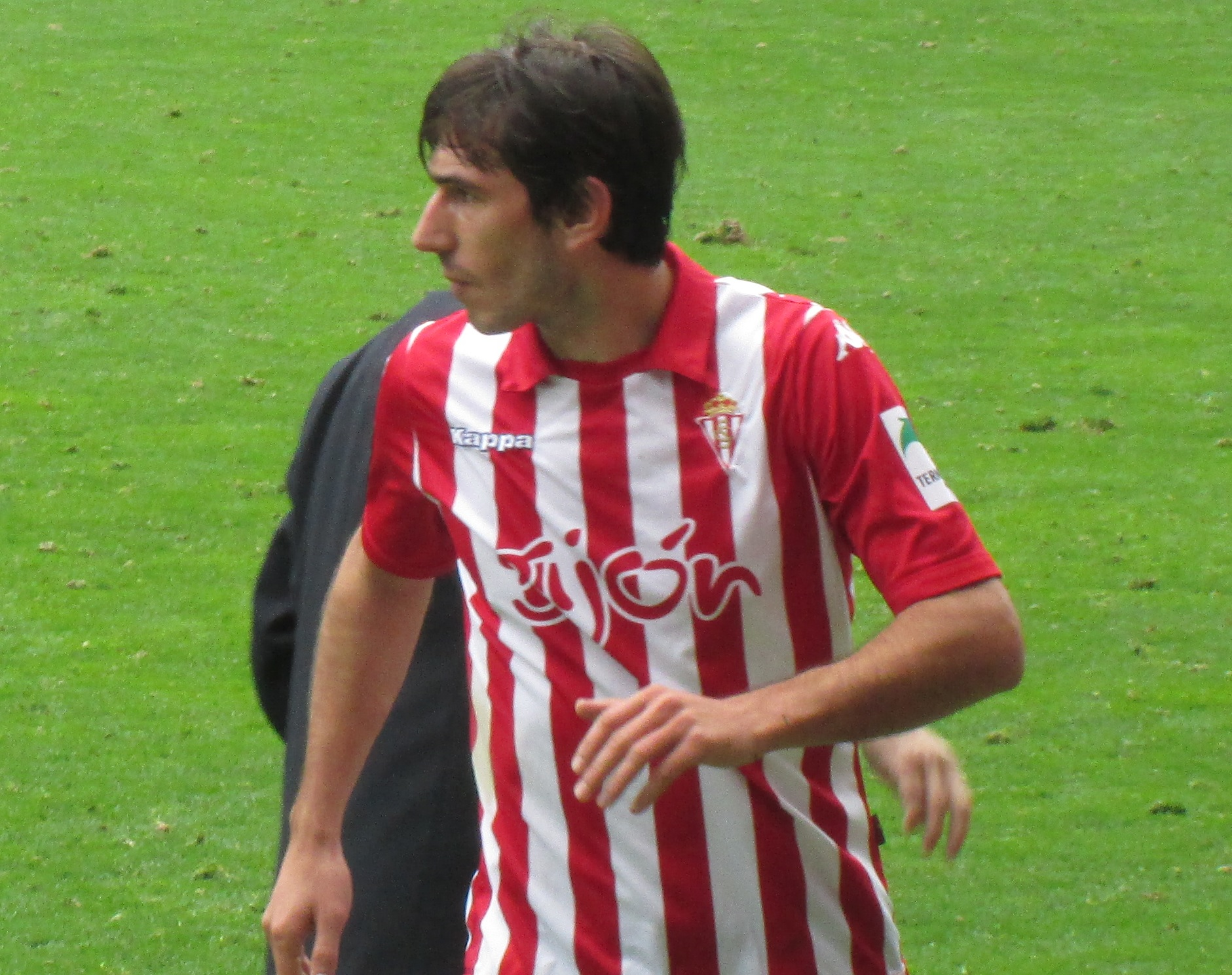
Lekić in action for Sporting de Gijón.

In July 2012, after two years playing in Spain, Lekić rescinded his link with the Navarrese outfit, and signed for Turkish Gençlerbirliği. In August 2013, he agreed a one-year loan to Sporting de Gijón, team of the Spanish Segunda División. He eventually returned to his parent club, rescinding his link in August 2014.

On 1 September 2014, Lekić signed a one-year deal with SD Eibar, newly promoted to the top level. After making only one start during the whole campaign and with his side ending in the relegation places, he left the club.

On 11 November 2015, Lekić signed a deal with Indian club Atlético de Kolkata midway through the second ISL season.

On 30 December 2015 Lekić moved back to Spain, signing for Girona FC in the second tier. On 11 August of the following year, he was transferred to fellow league team RCD Mallorca.

On 1 September 2017, free agent Lekić signed for CF Reus Deportiu. Roughly one year later, he moved to fellow second division side Cádiz CF on a one-year contract. He left the club on 31 August 2019.

On 29 January 2020, he moved to CD Atlético Baleares. After two appearances, he left the club on 1 August 2020.

== International career ==
Lekić made his debut for Serbia in a November 2009 friendly match away against Northern Ireland, coming on as a 76th-minute substitute for Danko Lazović, and earned a total of 10 caps (no goals). His final international was an October 2012 World Cup qualification match away against Macedonia.

=== Career statistics ===
As of 18 June 2016

Club performance			League		Cup		Continental		Total	
Season	Club	League	Apps	Goals	Apps	Goals	Apps	Goals	Apps	Goals
Serbia			League		Serbian Cup		Europe		Total	
2009–10	Red Star	SuperLiga	27	12	3	2	6	3	36	17
Spain			League		Copa del Rey		Europe		Total	
2010–11	Osasuna	La Liga	27	2	2	1	0	0	29	3
2011–12	Osasuna	La Liga	18	4	4	2	0	0	22	6
Turkey			League		Turkish Cup		Europe		Total	
2012–13	Gençlerbirliği	Süper Lig	21	3	2	1	0	0	23	4
Spain			League		Copa del Rey		Europe		Total	
2013–14	Sporting Gijón	Segunda División	36	12	1	1	0	0	37	13
2014–15	Eibar	La Liga	18	0	0	0	0	0	18	0
India			League		Cup		Continental		Total	
2015	Atlético de Kolkata	Indian Super League	6	2	0	0	0	0	6	2
Spain			League		Copa del Rey		Europe		Total	
2015–16	Girona	Segunda División	17	5	0	0	0	0	17	5
			League		Cup		Continental		Total	
Total	India		6	2	0	0	0	0	6	2
Total	Serbia		27	12	3	2	6	3	36	17
Total	Spain		99	23	7	4	0	0	108	27
Total	Turkey		21	3	2	1	0	0	23	4
Career total			153	40	12	7	6	3	171	50

== Honours ==
Red Star

- Serbian Cup: 2009–10
