= 2016–17 Valencia CF season =

97th season in existence of Valencia CF

Valencia CF
2016–17 season
- Owner: Peter Lim
- President: Chan Lay Hoon (until 10 April 2017); Anil Murthy (starting 11 April 2017)
- Head coach: Pako Ayestarán (until 20 September 2016); Voro (caretaker) (starting 20 September 2016 until 28 September 2016); Cesare Prandelli (starting 28 September 2016 until 30 December 2016); Voro (caretaker) (starting 30 December 2016)
- Stadium: Mestalla
- La Liga: 12th
- Copa del Rey: Round of 16
- Top goalscorer: League: Mina, Munir, Parejo, Zaza (6 goals each); All: Munir, Rodrigo (7 goals each)
Home colours	Away colours	Third colours

The 2016–17 Valencia CF season was the club's 97th season and its 82nd in La Liga. As in the previous season, the club finished 12th in La Liga. Valencia also competed in the Copa del Rey, entering at the Round of 32 and being eliminated by Celta Vigo 6–2 on aggregate in the Round of 16.

== Squad ==
As of 24 February 2017

Note: Flags indicate national team as defined under FIFA eligibility rules; some limited exceptions apply. Players may hold more than one non-FIFA nationality.

No.	Pos.	Nation	Player
1	GK	BRA	Diego Alves
2	DF	POR	João Cancelo
4	DF	BRA	Aderlan Santos
5	DF	FRA	Eliaquim Mangala (on loan from Manchester City)
6	DF	BRA	Guilherme Siqueira (on loan from Atlético Madrid)
7	MF	ESP	Mario Suárez (on loan from Watford)
8	MF	ARG	Enzo Pérez (captain)
9	FW	ESP	Munir (on loan from Barcelona)
10	MF	ESP	Dani Parejo
11	MF	BEL	Zakaria Bakkali
12	FW	ITA	Simone Zaza (on loan from Juventus)
13	GK	ESP	Jaume Domènech
14	DF	ESP	José Luis Gayà

No.	Pos.	Nation	Player
15	MF	CHI	Fabián Orellana (on loan from Celta Vigo)
17	MF	POR	Nani
18	MF	ESP	Carlos Soler
19	FW	ESP	Rodrigo
20	MF	ESP	Álvaro Medrán
21	DF	ESP	Martín Montoya
22	FW	ESP	Santi Mina
23	DF	TUN	Aymen Abdennour
24	DF	ARG	Ezequiel Garay
25	GK	AUS	Mathew Ryan
26	DF	ESP	Lato
27	FW	ESP	Rafa Mir

=== Out on loan ===
Note: Flags indicate national team as defined under FIFA eligibility rules; some limited exceptions apply. Players may hold more than one non-FIFA nationality.

No.	Pos.	Nation	Player
—	FW	BRA	Vinícius Araújo (at Huesca until 30 June 2017)

== Transfers ==
=== In ===
No.	Pos.	Nat.	Name	Age	EU	Moving from	Type	Transfer window	Ends	Transfer fee	Source
15	MF	(Argentina)	Fede Cartabia	23	Non-EU	(Spain) Deportivo La Coruña	Loan return	Summer		Free	
	MF	(Spain)	Robert	23	EU	(Spain) Granada	Loan return	Summer		Free	
	DF	(Spain)	Salva Ruiz	31	EU	(Spain) Granada	Loan return	Summer		Free	
17	MF	(Portugal)	Nani	39	EU	(Turkey) Fenerbahçe	Transfer	Summer		€8,500,000	
20	MF	(Spain)	Álvaro Medrán	32	EU	(Spain) Real Madrid	Transfer	Summer		€1,500,000	FourFourTwo
21	DF	(Spain)	Martín Montoya	35	EU	(Spain) Barcelona	Transfer	Summer		Free	Sky Sports
7	MF	(Spain)	Mario Suárez	39	EU	(England) Watford	Loan	Summer	30 June 2017	N/A	Superdeporte
9	FW	(Spain)	Munir	31	EU	(Spain) Barcelona	Loan	Summer	30 June 2017	N/A	Valencia CF
5	DF	(France)	Eliaquim Mangala	35	EU	(England) Manchester City	Loan	Summer	30 June 2017	N/A	
24	DF	(Argentina)	Ezequiel Garay	39	Non-EU	(Russia) Zenit	Transfer	Summer		€20,000,000	
12	FW	(Italy)	Simone Zaza	35	EU	(Italy) Juventus	Loan	Winter		N/A	
15	MF	(Chile)	Fabián Orellana	40	Non-EU	(Spain) Celta Vigo	Loan	Winter	30 June 2017	N/A	ESPN

Total spend: €30,000,000

=== Out ===
No.	Pos.	Nat.	Name	Age	EU	Moving to	Type	Transfer window	Transfer fee	Source
24	MF	(Russia)	Denis Cheryshev	25	EU	(Spain) Villarreal	Loan return to Real Madrid	Summer	NA	
8	MF	(Algeria)	Sofiane Feghouli	26	Non-EU	(England) West Ham United	Free Transfer	Summer	Free	
29	MF	(France)	Wilfried Zahibo	22	EU	(Spain) Gimnàstic	Free Transfer	Summer	Free	
	GK	(Spain)	Yoel	27	EU	(Spain) Eibar	Loan	Summer		
19	DF	(Spain)	Antonio Barragán	29	EU	(England) Middlesbrough	Transfer	Summer	€3,000,000	
11	MF	(Argentina)	Pablo Piatti	27	Non-EU	(Spain) Espanyol	Loan	Summer		
7	ST	(Spain)	Álvaro Negredo	30	EU	(England) Middlesbrough	Loan	Summer		
11	MF	(Argentina)	Rodrigo De Paul	22	Non-EU	(Italy) Udinese	Transfer	Summer	€3,000,000	
21	MF	(Portugal)	André Gomes	22	EU	(Spain) Barcelona	Transfer	Summer	€35,000,000	
	DM	(Brazil)	Danilo	20	Non-EU	(Portugal) Braga	Loan return	Summer	NA	
	MF	(Spain)	Javi Fuego	32	EU	(Spain) Espanyol	Transfer	Summer	€2,000,000	
9	FW	(Spain)	Paco Alcácer	23	EU	(Spain) Barcelona	Transfer	Summer	€30,000,000	
5	DF	(Germany)	Shkodran Mustafi	24	EU	(England) Arsenal	Transfer	Summer	€41,000,000	
12	MF	(Spain)	Robert	23	EU	(Spain) Leganés	Loan	Summer		
3	DF	(Portugal)	Rúben Vezo	22	EU	(Spain) Granada	Loan	Summer		
24	MF	(Argentina)	Lucas Orbán	27	Non-EU	(Italy) Genoa	Transfer	Summer	Free	
16	MF	(Argentina)	Fede Cartabia	24	Non-EU	(Spain) Deportivo La Coruña	Transfer	Winter	Free	

Total Income: €114,000,000 Net income:

== Competitions ==
=== Overall ===
Competition	Started round	Final position / round	First match	Last match
La Liga	Matchday 1	12th	22 August 2016	21 May 2017
Copa del Rey	Round of 32	Round of 16	29 November 2016	12 January 2017

Updated to match played 21 May 2017
Source: Competitions

=== Overview ===
Competition	Record							
Competition	Pld	W	D	L	GF	GA	GD	Win %
La Liga	38	13	7	18	56	65	−9	34.21
Copa del Rey	4	2	0	2	7	8	−1	50.00
Total	42	15	7	20	63	73	−10	35.71

Last updated: 21 May 2017
Source: Competitions

=== La Liga ===
==== League table ====
Pos	Team	Pld	W	D	L	GF	GA	GD	Pts
10	Eibar	38	15	9	14	56	51	+5	54
11	Málaga	38	12	10	16	49	55	−6	46 (Note: Málaga ahead of Valencia on head-to-head points: Valencia–Málaga 2–2, Málaga–Valencia 2–0)
12	Valencia	38	13	7	18	56	65	−9	46
13	Celta Vigo	38	13	6	19	53	69	−16	45
14	Las Palmas	38	10	9	19	53	74	−21	39 (Note: Las Palmas ahead of Real Betis on head-to-head goal difference: Las Palmas–Real Betis 4–1, Real Betis–Las Palmas 2–0)

Source: La Liga, Soccerway
Rules for classification: 1) Points; 2) Head-to-head points; 3) Head-to-head goal difference; 4) Goal difference; 5) Goals scored; 6) Fair-play points; 7) Play-off.

==== Matches ====
Win Draw Loss Postponed

22 August 2016 1	Valencia	2–4	Las Palmas	Valencia
22:00 CEST (UTC+02:00)	Mina 6', 34', (yellow card) 29'; Medrán (yellow card) 71'	Report	Livaja 16', 88', (yellow card) 90'; Viera 24' (pen.); Boateng 31', (yellow card) 45'	Stadium: Mestalla; Attendance: 37,144; Referee: Iñaki Vicandi Garrido

28 August 2016 2	Eibar	1–0	Valencia	Eibar
18:15 CEST (UTC+02:00)	Luna (yellow card) 35'; Pedro León 62'; Kike (yellow card) 73'	Report	Nani (yellow card) 36'; Pérez (yellow card) 63'	Stadium: Ipurua; Attendance: 4,419; Referee: Alejandro José Hernández Hernández

11 September 2016 3	Valencia	2–3	Real Betis	Valencia
16:00 CEST (UTC+02:00)	Pérez (yellow card) 22' (red card) 50'; Nani (yellow card) 60'; Rodrigo 75'; Garay 78'	Report	Castro 38', 90+2'; Joaquín 54'; Brašanac (yellow card) 56'; Piccini (yellow card) 63'; Petros (yellow card) 71'; Musonda (yellow card) 72'	Stadium: Mestalla; Attendance: 36,789; Referee: José Luis González González

18 September 2016 4	Athletic Bilbao	2–1	Valencia	Bilbao
16:15 CEST (UTC+02:00)	García (yellow card) 19'; Aduriz 24', 41', (yellow card) 84'; Beñat (yellow card) 27'; Susaeta (yellow card) 74'	Report	Medrán 2'; Gayà (yellow card) 23'; Parejo (yellow card) 66'; Cancelo (yellow card) 77'; Mangala (yellow card) 90+1'	Stadium: San Mamés; Attendance: 40,907; Referee: Jesús Gil Manzano

21 September 2016 5	Valencia	2–1	Alavés	Valencia
22:00 CEST (UTC+02:00)	Laguardia 28' (o.g.); Mangala (yellow card) 56'; Parejo 88' (pen.); Alves (yellow card) 90+1'	Report	Toquero 45'; Torres (yellow card) 57'; Hernandez (yellow card) 77'; Alexis (yellow card) 87'; Femenía (yellow card) 88'	Stadium: Mestalla; Attendance: 32,347; Referee: Santiago Jaime Latre

25 September 2016 6	Leganés	1–2	Valencia	Leganés
12:00 CEST (UTC+02:00)	Szymanowski 21'; Guerrero (yellow card) 40'; Luciano (yellow card) 66'; Serantes (yellow card) 81'; Alberto (yellow card) 90+1'	Report	Pérez (yellow card) 11'; Montoya (yellow card) 17'; Nani 34', (yellow card) 81'; Suárez 52'; Alves (yellow card) 66'	Stadium: Butarque; Attendance: 10,622; Referee: David Fernández Borbalán

2 October 2016 7	Valencia	0–2	Atlético Madrid	Valencia
12:00 CEST	Mangala (yellow card) 60'	Report	Filipe Luís (yellow card) 28'; Griezmann (yellow card) 58', (goal) 63'; Tiago (yellow card) 82'; Gameiro 90+3'	Stadium: Mestalla; Attendance: 43,327; Referee: Carlos Clos Gómez

16 October 2016 8	Sporting Gijón	1–2	Valencia	Gijón
18:30 CEST	Aït-Atmane (yellow card) 23'; Castro 41'; Čop (yellow card) 45+1'; Meré (yellow card) 64'; Burgui (yellow card) 76'; Amorebieta (yellow card) 90'	Report	Suárez 7', 65'; Bakkali (yellow card) 80'	Stadium: El Molinón; Attendance: 23,915; Referee: José Luis Munuera Montero

23 October 2016 9	Valencia	2–3	Barcelona	Valencia
16:15 CEST	Garay (yellow card) 17'; Alves (yellow card) 23'; Munir 52'; Rodrigo 56'; M. Suárez (yellow card) 69'; Pérez (yellow card) 76'; Abdennour (yellow card) 90+2'	Report	Messi 22', 90+3', (yellow card) 73'; Busquets (yellow card) 25'; Digne (yellow card) 47'; Neymar (yellow card) 51'; L. Suárez 62'	Stadium: Mestalla; Attendance: 46,804; Referee: Alberto Undiano Mallenco

30 October 2016 10	Deportivo La Coruña	1–1	Valencia	A Coruña
20:45 CET	Çolak 45+2'; Albentosa (yellow card) 60'	Report	Nani (yellow card) 34'; Mangala (yellow card) 54'; Rodrigo 56'; Garay (yellow card) 64'; Pérez (yellow card) 66'; Montoya (yellow card) 90+2'	Stadium: Riazor; Attendance: 23,492; Referee: José Luis González González

6 November 2016 11	Celta Vigo	2–1	Valencia	Vigo
16:15 CET	Guidetti (yellow card) 22', (goal) 77'; Costas (yellow card) 32'; Jonny (yellow card) 32'; Roncaglia 43'; Aspas (yellow card) 76'; Fontàs (yellow card) 86'; Blanco (yellow card) 90'	Report	Parejo 32' (pen.); Suárez (yellow card) 59'	Stadium: Balaídos; Attendance: 18,251; Referee: Carlos Clos Gómez

20 November 2016 12	Valencia	1–1	Granada	Valencia
16:15 CET	Cancelo (yellow card) 7'; Nani 47'; Munir (yellow card) 90+3'	Report	Pereira (yellow card) 19'; Carcela 45+1'; Toral (yellow card) 49'; Samper (yellow card) 72'; Ochoa (yellow card) 79'; Agbo (yellow card) 90+3'	Stadium: Mestalla; Attendance: 34,884; Referee: Alejandro José Hernández Hernández

26 November 2016 13	Sevilla	2–1	Valencia	Seville
20:45 CET	Garay 53' (o.g.); Pareja 75'	Report	Munir 65'; Siqueira (yellow card) 77'	Stadium: Ramón Sánchez Pizjuán; Attendance: 31,988; Referee: Carlos del Cerro Grande

4 December 2016 14	Valencia	2–2	Málaga	Valencia
20:45 CET	Rodrigo 7', (yellow card) 44'; Medrán 34', (yellow card) 73'; Cancelo (yellow card) 68'; Garay (yellow card) 73'; Abdennour (yellow card) 85'	Report	Fornals 3', 90+3'; Castro (yellow card) 9'	Stadium: Mestalla; Attendance: 23,121; Referee: Ignacio Iglesias Villanueva

10 December 2016 15	Real Sociedad	3–2	Valencia	San Sebastián
CET	Willian José 2', 24'; Navas (yellow card) 35'; Vela (yellow card) 62'; Illarramendi (yellow card) 76'; Zurutuza (yellow card) 89'; Juanmi 90+1'	Report	Parejo 36' (pen.), (yellow card) 67'; Cancelo (yellow card) 53' (yellow-red card) 82'; Montoya (yellow card) 62'; Abdennour (yellow card) 67'; Bakkali (yellow card) 78', (goal) 90+3'	Stadium: Anoeta; Attendance: 22,817; Referee: Xavier Estrada Fernández

8 January 2017 16	Osasuna	3–3	Valencia	Pamplona
20:45 CET	Riera 7'; Márquez (yellow card) 38'; Torres 62'; Oier (yellow card) 80'; Clerc 90+2'	Report	Munir 2', (yellow card) 88'; Suárez (yellow card) 9'; Parejo (yellow card) 24'; Mangala (yellow card) 41'; Riera 45' (o.g.); Montoya 73'; Pérez (yellow card) 90+4'	Stadium: El Sadar; Attendance: 12,239; Referee: Alfonso Álvarez Izquierdo

15 January 2017 17	Valencia	2–1	Espanyol	Valencia
12:00 CET	Montoya 17'; Soler (yellow card) 54'; Parejo (yellow card) 56'; Gayà (yellow card) 57'; Munir (yellow card) 59'; Mina 73'; Alves (yellow card) 75'	Report	David López 85'	Stadium: Mestalla; Attendance: 33,932; Referee: José María Sánchez Martínez

22 January 2017 18	Villarreal	0–2	Valencia	Villarreal
20:45 CET	Ruiz (yellow card) 49'; Costa (yellow card) 89'	Report	Pérez (yellow card) 33'; Soler 35'; Mina 42'; Garay (yellow card) 80'	Stadium: La Cerámica; Attendance: 17,615; Referee: José González González

29 January 2017 19	Las Palmas	3–1	Valencia	Las Palmas
20:45 CET	Viera 42'; Lemos 57'; Boateng 61'; Mesa (yellow card) 82'	Report	Mina 21'; Nani (yellow card) 27'; Pérez (yellow card) 44'; Munir (yellow card) 48' (yellow-red card) 51'; Parejo (yellow card) 64'	Stadium: Gran Canaria; Attendance: 20,427; Referee: Santiago Jaime Latre

4 February 2017 20	Valencia	0–4	Eibar	Valencia
20:45 CET	Soler (red card) 45+1'; Gayà (yellow card) 66'; Garay (yellow card) 88'	Report	Enrich 28', 77'; Adrián 45+3' (pen.); García 57'; Ramis (yellow card) 68'	Stadium: Mestalla; Attendance: 32,571; Referee: José Luis Munuera Montero

11 February 2017 21	Real Betis	0–0	Valencia	Seville
13:00 CET	Mandi (yellow card) 63'; Pezzella (yellow card) 87'; Ceballos (yellow card) 89'; Sanabria (yellow card) 89'	Report	Santos (yellow card) 21'; Parejo (yellow card) 57'; Zaza (yellow card) 78'	Stadium: Benito Villamarín; Attendance: 30,567; Referee: Daniel Trujillo Suárez

19 February 2017 22	Valencia	2–0	Athletic Bilbao	Valencia
16:15 CET	Nani 13'; Zaza 45+1'	Report	García (yellow card) 29'	Stadium: Mestalla; Attendance: 36,317; Referee: David Fernández Borbalán

22 February 2017 23	Valencia	2–1	Real Madrid	Valencia
18:45 CET	Zaza 4', (yellow card) 19'; Orellana 9'; Munir (yellow card) 43'; Pérez (yellow card) 54'; Mangala (yellow card) 67'; Parejo (yellow card) 90'	Report	Carvajal (yellow card) 29'; Ronaldo 44'; Varane (yellow card) 59'	Stadium: Mestalla; Attendance: 45,833; Referee: Ricardo de Burgos Bengoetxea

25 February 2017 24	Alavés	2–1	Valencia	Vitoria-Gasteiz
13:00 CET	M. García (yellow card) 18'; Llorente (yellow card) 41'; Hernandez (yellow card) 42'; Laguardia (yellow card) 68'; Ibai 78'; Katai 86'	Report	Cancelo (yellow card) 16'; Soler 70', (yellow card) 75'; Orellana (yellow card) 77' (yellow-red card) 88'	Stadium: Mendizorrotza; Attendance: 15,268; Referee: Mario Melero López

28 February 2017 25	Valencia	1–0	Leganés	Valencia
21:30 CET	Mangala 29', (yellow card) 66'; Parejo (yellow card) 60'; Zaza (yellow card) 90+3'	Report	Marín (yellow card) 10'; Pérez (yellow card) 64'; Alberto (yellow card) 67' (yellow-red card) 80'	Stadium: Mestalla; Attendance: 26,809; Referee: Iñaki Vicandi Garrido

5 March 2017 26	Atlético Madrid	3–0	Valencia	Madrid
16:15 CET	Griezmann 10', 83'; Carrasco (yellow card) 30'; Gameiro 48'	Report	Pérez (yellow card) 20'; Mina (yellow card) 90+2'	Stadium: Vicente Calderón; Attendance: 46,439; Referee: Xavier Estrada Fernández

11 March 2017 27	Valencia	1–1	Sporting Gijón	Valencia
13:00 CET	Orellana (yellow card) 2'; Zaza (yellow card) 19'; Mangala (yellow card) 50'; Munir 85'	Report	Cases (yellow card) 29'; Douglas (yellow card) 49'; Čop 60', (yellow card) 76'; Cuéllar (yellow card) 79'; Torres (yellow card) 90+1'	Stadium: Mestalla; Attendance: 28,921; Referee: Alfonso Álvarez Izquierdo

19 March 2017 28	Barcelona	4–2	Valencia	Barcelona
20:45 CET	L. Suárez 35'; Messi 45' (pen.), 52', (yellow card) 86'; Iniesta (yellow card) 67'; Gomes (yellow card) 77', (goal) 89'	Report	Pérez (yellow card) 24'; Mangala 29', (yellow card) 39' (red card) 44'; Parejo (yellow card) 43'; Munir 45'; Montoya (yellow card) 90+1'	Stadium: Camp Nou; Attendance: 78,675; Referee: Alejandro Hernández Hernández

2 April 2017 29	Valencia	3–0	Deportivo La Coruña	Valencia
18:30 CEST	Montoya (yellow card) 7'; Garay 10'; Albentosa 29' (o.g.); Abdennour (yellow card) 50'; Pérez (yellow card) 55'; Cancelo 90+1'	Report	Joselu (yellow card) 16'	Stadium: Mestalla; Attendance: 34,638; Referee: Ricardo de Burgos Bengoetxea

6 April 2017 30	Valencia	3–2	Celta Vigo	Valencia
CEST	Orellana (yellow card) 22'; Parejo 38'; Munir 67'; Soler 86'	Report	Cabral 16'; Bongonda (yellow card) 30'; Aspas 80' (pen.)	Stadium: Mestalla; Attendance: 29,307; Referee: David Fernández Borbalán

9 April 2017 31	Granada	1–3	Valencia	Granada
12:00 CEST	Uche (yellow card) 39'; Ponce 65'; Wakaso (yellow card) 70'	Report	Zaza 19', 21'; Soler (yellow card) 46'; Mina 55'; Montoya (yellow card) 74'	Stadium: Los Cármenes; Attendance: 15,159; Referee: Iñaki Vicandi Garrido

16 April 2017 32	Valencia	0–0	Sevilla	Valencia
16:15 CEST	Lato (yellow card) 22'; Pérez (yellow card) 30'; Soler (yellow card) 50'	Report	Jovetić (yellow card) 65'; Iborra (yellow card) 70'	Stadium: Mestalla; Attendance: 36,809; Referee: José González González

22 April 2017 33	Málaga	2–0	Valencia	Málaga
13:00 CEST	Recio (yellow card) 13', (goal) 36'; Sandro 40'; Llorente (yellow card) 45'; Juan Carlos (yellow card) 70'	Report	Mangala (yellow card) 39'; Parejo (yellow card) 62'; Pérez (yellow card) 70'	Stadium: La Rosaleda; Attendance: 23,422; Referee: Ignacio Iglesias Villanueva

26 April 2017 34	Valencia	2–3	Real Sociedad	Valencia
20:30 CEST	Siqueira (yellow card) 28'; Garay (yellow card) 29'; Zaza (yellow card) 47', (goal) 72'; Nani 68' (pen.); Cancelo (yellow card) 81'	Report	Alves 1' (o.g.); Juanmi (yellow card) 21'; Willian José 30' (pen.), (yellow card) 49'; I. Martínez (yellow card) 43'; Oyarzabal 65'	Stadium: Mestalla; Attendance: 26,101; Referee: Carlos del Cerro Grande

29 April 2017 35	Real Madrid	2–1	Valencia	Madrid
16:15 CEST	Ronaldo 27'; Casemiro (yellow card) 52'; Morata (yellow card) 77'; Modrić (yellow card) 82'; Marcelo 86'	Report	Parejo (yellow card) 21', (goal) 82'; Lato (yellow card) 25'; Garay (yellow card) 56'; Mangala (yellow card) 64'	Stadium: Santiago Bernabéu; Attendance: 75,180; Referee: Jesús Gil Manzano

7 May 2017 36	Valencia	4–1	Osasuna	Valencia
16:15 CEST	Garay 22', 45'; Gayà (yellow card) 62'; Zaza (yellow card) 64' (goal) 70'; Rodrigo 75'; Montoya (yellow card) 90+1'	Report	García (yellow card) 47'; Fuentes (yellow card) 77'; Olavide 90+2'	Stadium: Mestalla; Attendance: 24,860; Referee: Carlos Clos Gómez

14 May 2017 37	Espanyol	0–1	Valencia	Cornellà de Llobregat
16:00 CEST		Report	Nani (yellow card) 34'; Orellana (yellow card) 59'; Gayà 75'; Medrán (yellow card) 81'; Montoya (yellow card) 85'	Stadium: Cornellà-El Prat; Attendance: 20,111; Referee: Daniel Ocón Arráiz

21 May 2017 38	Valencia	1–3	Villarreal	Valencia
16:45 CEST	Zaza (yellow card) 34'; Nani 54'; Parejo (yellow card) 71'	Summary	Soldado 1'; Costa (yellow card) 4'; Trigueros 58'; Bakambu (yellow card) 67'; Sansone 88'	Stadium: Mestalla; Attendance: 33,659; Referee: David Fernández Borbalán

=== Copa del Rey ===
Valencia joined the competition in the round of 32.

==== Round of 32 ====
29 November 2016 First leg	Leganés	1–3	Valencia	Leganés
20:00 CET	Gabriel (yellow card) 24'; Sastre (yellow card) 50'; Machís 59'; Alberto (yellow card) 69'	Report	Munir 3'; Medrán 25'; Mangala (yellow card) 31'; Bakkali 90+1'	Stadium: Butarque; Attendance: 6,781; Referee: José González González

21 December 2016 Second leg	Valencia	2–1 (5–2 agg.)	Leganés	Valencia
21:00 CET	Rodrigo 36', 89'; Medrán (yellow card) 54'	Report	Pérez (yellow card) 48'; Machís 49'; Marín (yellow card) 57'; Guerrero (yellow card) 90+4'	Stadium: Mestalla; Attendance: 22,041; Referee: Mario Melero López

==== Round of 16 ====
3 January 2017 First leg	Valencia	1–4	Celta Vigo	Valencia
19:00 CET	Medrán (yellow card) 23'; Pérez (yellow card) 25'; Munir (yellow card) 57'; Parejo 58' (pen.); Siqueira (yellow card) 68'	Report	Aspas 3' (pen.); Bongonda 14'; Wass 19'; Sergio (yellow card) 57'; Guidetti 75'	Stadium: Mestalla; Attendance: 33,958; Referee: Xavier Estrada Fernández

12 January 2017 Second leg	Celta Vigo	2–1 (6–2 agg.)	Valencia	Vigo
19:00 CET	Rossi 61'; Sisto 90+3'	Report	Mangala (yellow card) 60'; Araújo 63'	Stadium: Balaídos; Attendance: 9,970; Referee: Alejandro Hernández Hernández

== Statistics ==
=== Appearances and goals ===
Last updated on 21 May 2017

No.	Pos	Nat	Player	Total		La Liga		Copa del Rey	
No.	Pos	Nat	Player	Apps	Goals	Apps	Goals	Apps	Goals
Goalkeepers
1	GK	(Brazil) BRA	Diego Alves	33	0	33	0	0	0
13	GK	(Spain) ESP	Jaume Domènech	7	0	3	0	4	0
25	GK	(Australia) AUS	Mathew Ryan	2	0	2	0	0	0
Defenders
2	DF	(Portugal) POR	João Cancelo	38	1	27+8	1	3	0
4	DF	(Brazil) BRA	Aderlan Santos	15	0	11+1	0	1+2	0
5	DF	(France) FRA	Eliaquim Mangala	33	2	30	2	3	0
6	DF	(Brazil) BRA	Guilherme Siqueira	11	0	7+3	0	1	0
14	DF	(Spain) ESP	José Luis Gayà	30	1	24+3	1	1+2	0
21	DF	(Spain) ESP	Martín Montoya	31	2	26+3	2	2	0
23	DF	(Tunisia) TUN	Aymen Abdennour	14	0	9+4	0	1	0
24	DF	(Argentina) ARG	Ezequiel Garay	28	4	27	4	1	0
26	DF	(Spain) ESP	Lato	9	0	4+4	0	1	0
40	DF	(Spain) ESP	Javier Jiménez	2	0	0	0	2	0
Midfielders
7	MF	(Spain) ESP	Mario Suárez	24	3	17+4	3	3	0
8	MF	(Argentina) ARG	Enzo Pérez	29	0	26+1	0	2	0
10	MF	(Spain) ESP	Dani Parejo	39	6	36	5	2+1	1
11	MF	(Belgium) BEL	Zakaria Bakkali	21	2	1+17	1	1+2	1
15	MF	(Chile) CHI	Fabián Orellana	16	1	13+3	1	0	0
17	MF	(Portugal) POR	Nani	26	5	22+3	5	1	0
18	MF	(Spain) ESP	Carlos Soler	26	3	19+4	3	1+2	0
20	MF	(Spain) ESP	Álvaro Medrán	20	3	10+6	2	4	1
33	MF	(Spain) ESP	Nacho Gil	2	0	0+2	0	0	0
34	MF	(Spain) ESP	Sito	1	0	0+1	0	0	0
Forwards
9	FW	(Spain) ESP	Munir	36	7	22+11	6	3	1
12	FW	(Italy) ITA	Simone Zaza	20	6	15+5	6	0	0
19	FW	(Spain) ESP	Rodrigo	21	7	17+2	5	2	2
22	FW	(Spain) ESP	Santi Mina	31	6	13+16	6	2	0
27	FW	(Spain) ESP	Rafa Mir	5	0	0+2	0	1+2	0
Players who have made an appearance or had a squad number this season but have been loaned out or transferred
3	DF	(Portugal) POR	Rúben Vezo	1	0	1	0	0	0
5	DF	(Germany) GER	Shkodran Mustafi	1	0	0+1	0	0	0
16	MF	(Argentina) ARG	Federico Cartabia	6	0	2+2	0	1+1	0
9	FW	(Spain) ESP	Paco Alcácer	1	0	1	0	0	0
18	FW	(Brazil) BRA	Vinícius Araújo	1	1	1	0	0	1
