= 2016–17 CD Leganés season =

CD Leganés
2016–17 season
- President: María Victoria Pavón
- Head coach: Asier Garitano
- Stadium: Butarque
- La Liga: 17th
- Copa del Rey: Round of 32
Home colours

The 2016–17 CD Leganés season is the club's 89th season in its history and its first in La Liga, the top-flight of Spanish football.

== Players ==
As of 11 September 2016

Note: Flags indicate national team as defined under FIFA eligibility rules; some limited exceptions apply. Players may hold more than one non-FIFA nationality.

No.	Pos.	Nation	Player
1	GK	ITA	Alberto Brignoli (on loan from Juventus)
3	DF	ESP	Unai Bustinza
4	DF	ESP	Adrián Marín (on loan from Villarreal)
5	DF	ARG	Martín Mantovani
6	MF	ESP	Alberto
7	FW	VEN	Darwin Machís (on loan from Granada)
8	MF	BRA	Gabriel
9	FW	ESP	Miguel Ángel Guerrero
10	MF	ESP	Toni Dovale
11	MF	ARG	Alexander Szymanowski
12	DF	ALG	Carl Medjani
13	GK	ESP	Jon Ander Serantes

No.	Pos.	Nation	Player
14	FW	CIV	Mamadou Koné
15	DF	ESP	Diego Rico
16	MF	ESP	Robert (on loan from Valencia)
17	DF	ESP	Víctor Díaz
18	DF	ESP	Pablo Insua (on loan from Deportivo La Coruña)
19	MF	ESP	Unai López (on loan from Athletic Bilbao)
20	FW	BRA	Luciano (on loan from Corinthians)
21	MF	ESP	Rubén Pérez (on loan from Granada)
22	MF	ESP	Lluís Sastre
23	MF	ESP	Omar Ramos
24	MF	ESP	David Timor

== Transfers ==
In:

Out:

No.	Pos.	Nation	Player
25	GK	ITA	Alberto Brignoli (on loan from Juventus, previously on loan at Sampdoria)
9	FW	ESP	Miguel Ángel Guerrero (from Sporting Gijón)
19	MF	ESP	Unai López (on loan from Athletic Bilbao)
7	FW	VEN	Darwin Machís (on loan from Granada, previously on loan at Huesca)
4	DF	ESP	Adrián Marín (on loan from Villarreal)
12	DF	ALG	Carl Medjani (from Levante)
21	MF	ESP	Rubén Pérez (on loan from Granada)
15	DF	ESP	Diego Rico (from Real Zaragoza)
8	MF	BRA	Gabriel (from Juventus, previously on loan)
20	FW	BRA	Luciano (on loan from Corinthians)
14	FW	CIV	Mamadou Koné (from Racing Santander, previously on loan at Real Oviedo)

No.	Pos.	Nation	Player
4	DF	ESP	Unai Albizua (to UCAM Murcia)
19	FW	ESP	Asdrúbal (loan return to Las Palmas)
9	FW	ESP	Guillermo Fernández (loan return to Athletic Bilbao, later signed by Elche)
14	FW	ESP	Borja Lázaro (to Huesca)
8	MF	ESP	Jorge Miramón (to Reus)
20	MF	ESP	Rubén Peña (to Eibar)
1	GK	ESP	Queco Piña (to Huesca)
21	MF	ESP	Iñigo Ruiz de Galarreta (loan return to Athletic Bilbao, later signed by Numancia)
3	DF	ESP	Luis Ruiz (to Cádiz)
16	DF	ESP	César Soriano (to Huesca)

== Competitions ==
=== Overall ===
Competition	Current position/round	Final position/round
La Liga	16th	–
Copa del Rey	Round of 32	Round of 32

=== Liga ===
==== League table ====
Pos	Team	Pld	W	D	L	GF	GA	GD	Pts	Qualification or relegation
15	Real Betis	38	10	9	19	41	64	−23	39 (Note: Las Palmas ahead of Real Betis on head-to-head goal difference: Las Palmas–Real Betis 4–1, Real Betis–Las Palmas 2–0)	
16	Deportivo La Coruña	38	8	12	18	43	61	−18	36	
17	Leganés	38	8	11	19	36	55	−19	35	
18	Sporting Gijón (R)	38	7	10	21	42	72	−30	31	Relegation to Segunda División
19	Osasuna (R)	38	4	10	24	40	94	−54	22	Relegation to Segunda División

Source: La Liga, Soccerway
Rules for classification: 1) Points; 2) Head-to-head points; 3) Head-to-head goal difference; 4) Goal difference; 5) Goals scored; 6) Fair-play points; 7) Play-off.
(R) Relegated

==== Matches ====
Win Draw Loss

22 August 2016 1	Celta Vigo	0–1	Leganés	Vigo
20:00 CEST	Roncaglia (yellow card) 15'; Mallo (yellow card) 67'; Hernández (yellow card) 88'; Aspas (yellow card) 89'	Report	Marín (yellow card) 60'; Díaz 75'; Timor (red card) 90'	Stadium: Balaídos; Attendance: 16,578; Referee: José Luis Munuera Montero

27 August 2016 2	Leganés	0–0	Atlético Madrid	Leganés
22:15 CEST	Alberto (yellow card) 61'; Pérez (yellow card) 70'; Mantovani (yellow card) 72'	Report	Saúl (yellow card) 37'	Stadium: Butarque; Attendance: 10,958; Referee: José María Sánchez Martínez

11 September 2016 3	Sporting Gijón	2–1	Leganés	Gijón
12:00 CEST	Cases 17'; Čop 43' (pen.)	Report	Rico 58'; Serantes (yellow card) 60'; Timor (yellow card) 72'	Stadium: El Molinón; Attendance: 22,364; Referee: Iñaki Vicandi Garrido

17 September 2016 4	Leganés	1–5	Barcelona	Leganés
13:00 CEST	Medjani (yellow card) 27'; Díaz (yellow card) 39'; Bustinza (yellow card) 54'; Gabriel 80'; Ramos (yellow card) 87'	Report	Messi 15', 55' (pen.); Rakitić (yellow card) 24'; L. Suárez 31'; Neymar 44', (yellow card) 80'; Rafinha 64'	Stadium: Butarque; Attendance: 10,422; Referee: Ricardo de Burgos Bengoetxea

22 September 2016 5	Deportivo La Coruña	1–2	Leganés	A Coruña
20:00 CEST	Borges 31'	Report	Luciano (yellow card) 17', (goal) 55'; Pérez (yellow card) 59'; Gabriel 61'; Díaz (yellow card) 85'	Stadium: Riazor; Attendance: 18,466; Referee: Alberto Undiano Mallenco

25 September 2016 6	Leganés	1–2	Valencia	Leganés
12:00 CEST	Szymanowski 21'; Guerrero (yellow card) 40'; Luciano (yellow card) 66'; Serantes (yellow card) 81'; Alberto (yellow card) 90+1'	Report	Pérez (yellow card) 11'; Montoya (yellow card) 17'; Nani 34', (yellow card) 81'; Suárez 52'; Alves (yellow card) 66'	Stadium: Butarque; Attendance: 9,809; Referee: David Fernández Borbalán

1 October 2016 7	Granada	0–1	Leganés	Granada
13:00 CEST	Ponce (yellow card) 53'	Report	Szymanowski 76'	Stadium: Los Cármenes; Attendance: 15,196; Referee: Santiago Jaime Latre

15 October 2016 8	Leganés	2–3	Sevilla	Leganés
13:00 CEST	Gabriel (yellow card) 45'; Timor 67', (yellow card) 86'; Szymanowski 69'	Report	Vázquez 25', (yellow card) 34'; Vietto (yellow card) 38'; Vitolo (yellow card) 45'; Nasri 58', (yellow card) 81'; Iborra (yellow card) 81'; Sarabia 85'	Stadium: Butarque; Attendance: 9,886; Referee: Daniel Ocón Arráiz

23 October 2016 9	Málaga	4–0	Leganés	Málaga
18:30 CEST	Jony 40'; Castro 42'; Sandro 57'; Camacho 90+2'; Duda (yellow card) 90+2'	Report	Mantovani (yellow card) 15'; Rico (yellow card) 69'; López (yellow card) 90+2'	Stadium: La Rosaleda; Attendance: 19,065; Referee: Daniel Jesús Trujillo Suárez

28 October 2016 10	Leganés	0–2	Real Sociedad	Leganés
20:45 CEST	Guerrero (yellow card) 15'; Pérez (yellow card) 18'; Timor (yellow card) 31'; Rico (yellow card) 55'; Medjani (yellow card) 84'	Report	Willian José 29'; Prieto 59'; I. Martínez (yellow card) 62'; Zurutuza (yellow card) 75'	Stadium: Butarque; Attendance: 10,922; Referee: Alejandro Hernández Hernández

6 November 2016 11	Real Madrid	3–0	Leganés	Madrid
12:00 CET	Ronaldo (yellow card) 17'; Bale 38', 45+1'; Kroos (yellow card) 40'; Nacho (yellow card) 41'; Morata 76'	Report	Machís (yellow card) 8'; Insua (yellow card) 42'; Mantovani (yellow card) 61'; Ramos (yellow card) 82'; Díaz (yellow card) 90+1'	Stadium: Santiago Bernabéu; Attendance: 70,007; Referee: Antonio Mateu Lahoz

21 November 2016 12	Leganés	2–0	Osasuna	Leganés
20:45 CET	Robert 6', 57'; Rico (yellow card) 32'; Bustinza (yellow card) 62'	Report	D. García (yellow card) 43'; Rivère (yellow card) 55'; Olavide (yellow card) 88'	Stadium: Butarque; Attendance: 8,827; Referee: Ignacio Iglesias Villanueva

26 November 2016 13	Espanyol	3–0	Leganés	Cornellà de Llobregat
18:30 CET	Gerard 47'; Piatti 51', 88'; Jurado (yellow card) 68'	Report	Díaz (yellow card) 16'; Mantovani (yellow card) 47'	Stadium: RCDE Stadium; Attendance: 16,824; Referee: Juan Martínez Munuera

3 December 2016 14	Leganés	0–0	Villarreal	Leganés
18:30 CET	Gabriel (yellow card) 17'; Ramos (yellow card) 30'; Alberto (yellow card) 41'; Timor (yellow card) 52'; Insua (yellow card) 52'; Bustinza (yellow card) 57'	Report	Costa (yellow card) 20'; Mario (yellow card) 36'; Soriano (yellow card) 65'	Stadium: Butarque; Attendance: 8,526; Referee: Mario Melero López

10 December 2016 15	Las Palmas	1–1	Leganés	Las Palmas
18:30 CET	Livaja 21', (yellow card) 82'; Michel (yellow card) 68'; D. García (yellow card) 75'	Report	Bustinza (yellow card) 8'; Mantovani (yellow card) 22'; Díaz (yellow card) 36'; Guerrero 76' (pen.)	Stadium: Gran Canaria; Attendance: 19,131; Referee: Jesús Gil Manzano

18 December 2016 16	Leganés	1–1	Eibar	Leganés
16:15 CET	Guerrero 23'; Herrerín (red card) 26'; Timor (yellow card) 59'; Marín (yellow card) 89'	Report	Inui (yellow card) 34'; Adrián (yellow card) 62'; Bebé 76'	Stadium: Butarque; Attendance: 8,392; Referee: José Luis González González

8 January 2016 17	Real Betis	2–0	Leganés	Seville
16:15 CET (UTC+01:00)	Petros (yellow card) 30'; Castro 51'; Bruno (yellow card) 58'; Piccini 85'	Report	Mantovani (yellow card) 14'; Alberto (yellow card) 37'; López (yellow card) 60'; Ramos (yellow card) 74'; Bustinza (yellow card) 78'; Pérez (yellow card) 82'	Stadium: Benito Villamarín; Attendance: 36,328; Referee: Xavier Estrada Fernández

14 January 2017 18	Leganés	0–0	Athletic Bilbao	Leganés
13:00 CET	Díaz (yellow card) 51'; Pérez (yellow card) 67'; Insua (yellow card) 89'	Report	Aduriz (yellow card) 65'; García (yellow card) 69'; Beñat (yellow card) 80'	Stadium: Butarque; Attendance: 10,922; Referee: Santiago Jaime Latre

21 January 2017 19	Alavés	2–2	Leganés	Vitoria-Gasteiz
18:30 CET	Hernandez (yellow card) 43'; Laguardia 11'; Ibai (yellow card) 18'; Édgar 51'; Alexis (yellow card) 90+1'	Report	Guerrero 45'; Gabriel (yellow card) 83'; Insua 84'; Pérez (yellow card) 90+3'	Stadium: Mendizorrotza; Attendance: 19,126; Referee: José Luis Munuera Montero

28 January 2017 20	Leganés	0–2	Celta Vigo	Leganés
20:45 CET	Gabriel (yellow card) 87'	Report	Lemos 32'; Fontàs (yellow card) 45+1'; Guidetti 66' (pen.)	Stadium: Butarque; Attendance: 8,901; Referee: Daniel Trujillo Suárez

4 February 2017 21	Atlético Madrid	2–0	Leganés	Madrid
18:30 CET	Torres 15', 51'; Savić (yellow card) 32'	Report	Morán (yellow card) 30'	Stadium: Vicente Calderón; Attendance: 37,421; Referee: José María Sánchez Martínez

12 February 2017 22	Leganés	0–2	Sporting Gijón	Leganés
16:15 CET	Rico (yellow card) 21'; Bustinza (yellow card) 74'; Pérez (yellow card) 74'	Report	Canella (yellow card) 8', (goal) 66'; Traoré (yellow card) 30'; Carmona (yellow card) 54'; Mariño (red card) 70'; Čop (yellow card) 74'; Lillo (yellow card) 76'; Burgui 83', (yellow card) 84'	Stadium: Butarque; Attendance: 9,124; Referee: Xavier Estrada Fernández

19 February 2017 23	Barcelona	2–1	Leganés	Barcelona
20:45 CET	Messi 4', 90' (pen.); L. Suárez (yellow card) 46'	Report	Mantovani (yellow card) 55'; López 71'; Siovas (yellow card) 87'; Alberto (yellow card) 90+5'	Stadium: Camp Nou; Attendance: 63,378; Referee: Ignacio Iglesias Villanueva

25 February 2017 24	Leganés	4–0	Deportivo La Coruña	Leganés
18:30 CET	Szymanowski 19'; Mantovani 30'; Morán (yellow card) 66'; Guerrero (yellow card) 69'; López 81'; Bueno 90+1'	Report	Albentosa (red card) 62'; Lux (yellow card) 63'; Andone (yellow card) 69'; Guilherme (yellow card) 75'; Navarro (yellow card) 78'; Joselu (yellow card) 90'	Stadium: Butarque; Attendance: 9,524; Referee: José Luis Munuera Montero

28 February 2017 25	Valencia	1–0	Leganés	Valencia
21:30 CET	Mangala 29', (yellow card) 66'; Parejo (yellow card) 60'; Zaza (yellow card) 90+3'	Report	Marín (yellow card) 10'; Pérez (yellow card) 64'; Alberto (yellow card) 67' (yellow-red card) 80'	Stadium: Mestalla; Attendance: 26,809; Referee: Iñaki Vicandi Garrido

4 March 2017 26	Leganés	1–0	Granada	Leganés
13:00 CET	Morán (yellow card) 82'; Machís 83'; Rico (yellow card) 90'; Siovas (yellow card) 90'	Report	Carcela (yellow card) 44'; Wakaso (yellow card) 64'	Stadium: Butarque; Attendance: 9,472; Referee: Juan Martínez Munuera

11 March 2017 27	Sevilla	1–1	Leganés	Seville
16:15 CET	Jovetić 43'; Sarabia (yellow card) 57'; Kranevitter (yellow card) 75'	Report	Gabriel 3', (yellow card) 60'; Mantovani (yellow card) 67'; Pérez (yellow card) 89'	Stadium: Ramón Sánchez Pizjuán; Attendance: 31,738; Referee: José González González

19 March 2017 28	Leganés	0–0	Málaga	Leganés
12:00 CET	Bustinza (yellow card) 29'; Tito (yellow card) 32'; Morán (yellow card) 50'; Pérez (yellow card) 60'	Report	Rosales (yellow card) 34'; Charles (yellow card) 59'	Stadium: Butarque; Attendance: 10,127; Referee: Antonio Mateu Lahoz

1 April 2017 29	Real Sociedad	1–1	Leganés	San Sebastián
18:30 CEST	Juanmi (yellow card) 17', (goal) 53'; Gaztañaga (yellow card) 80'	Report	Mantovani (yellow card) 25'; Szymanowski 29'; Gabriel (yellow card) 60'; Morán (yellow card) 90+2'	Stadium: Anoeta; Attendance: 18,869; Referee: Mario Melero López

5 April 2017 30	Leganés	2–4	Real Madrid	Leganés
21:30 CEST	Gabriel 32', (yellow card) 57'; Luciano 34'; Bustinza (yellow card) 85'	Report	Rodríguez 15'; Morata 18', 23', 48'; Nacho (yellow card) 90'	Stadium: Butarque; Attendance: 10,922; Referee: Alfonso Álvarez Izquierdo

9 April 2017 31	Osasuna	2–1	Leganés	Pamplona
18:30 CEST	Fausto (yellow card) 24'; León 36' (pen.), 71'; Olavide (yellow card) 60'; Čaušić (yellow card) 64'	Report	Rico (yellow card) 13'; Siovas 16'; Gabriel (yellow card) 34'; Tito (yellow card) 36'; Morán (yellow card) 89'	Stadium: El Sadar; Attendance: 14,421; Referee: Daniel Ocón Arráiz

16 April 2017 32	Leganés	0–1	Espanyol	Leganés
12:00 CEST	Pérez (yellow card) 63'	Report	Fuego (yellow card) 53'; Baptistão 90+2'	Stadium: Butarque; Attendance: 9,127; Referee: Carlos Clos Gómez

22 April 2017 33	Villarreal	2–1	Leganés	Villarreal
16:15 CEST	Musacchio (yellow card) 65'; Bakambu 68', 90+2'	Report	Bustinza (yellow card) 73'; Morán (yellow card) 84'; Guerrero 90'; Siovas (yellow card) 90+3'	Stadium: La Cerámica; Attendance: 14,758; Referee: Santiago Jaime Latre

26 April 2017 34	Leganés	3–0	Las Palmas	Leganés
	Timor (yellow card) 41'; Luciano 55', 61' (pen.); Guerrero 59'	Report		Stadium: Butarque; Attendance: 9,193; Referee: Iñaki Vicandi Garrido

30 April 2017 35	Eibar	2–0	Leganés	Eibar
18:30 CEST	Pedro León (yellow card) 54'; Kike 62'; Enrich 66'	Report	Mantovani (yellow card) 34'	Stadium: Ipurua; Attendance: 5,256; Referee: Alfonso Álvarez Izquierdo

8 May 2017 36	Leganés	4–0	Real Betis	Leganés
20:45 CEST	Szymanowski 7' (pen.), 80'; El Zhar 15'; Tito (yellow card) 43'; Gabriel 65'; Siovas (yellow card) 76'; Luciano (yellow card) 90+1'	Report		Stadium: Butarque; Attendance: 9,443; Referee: Daniel Trujillo Suárez

14 May 2017 37	Athletic Bilbao	1–1	Leganés	Bilbao
20:00 CEST	Aduriz 14', (yellow card) 90+5'; Beñat (yellow card) 29'; San José (yellow card) 83'	Summary	Szymanowski (yellow card) 35', (goal) 61'; Bueno (yellow card) 39'; Pérez (yellow card) 44'; Bustinza (yellow card) 65'; El Zhar (yellow card) 73'; Timor (yellow card) 83'; Champagne (yellow card) 90+2'	Stadium: San Mamés; Attendance: 42,049; Referee: David Fernández Borbalán

20 May 2017 38	Leganés	1–1	Alavés	Leganés
19:00 CEST	Timor 89'	Summary	R. García (yellow card) 45+1'; Krstičić 64'	Stadium: Butarque; Attendance: 9,491; Referee: José González González

=== Copa del Rey ===
==== Round of 32 ====
29 November 2016 First leg	Leganés	1–3	Valencia	Leganés
20:00 CET	Gabriel (yellow card) 24'; Sastre (yellow card) 50'; Machís 59'; Alberto (yellow card) 69'	Report	Munir 3'; Medrán 25'; Mangala (yellow card) 31'; Bakkali 90+1'	Stadium: Butarque; Attendance: 6,781; Referee: José Luis González González

21 December 2016 Second leg	Valencia	2–1 (5–2 agg.)	Leganés	Valencia
21:00 CET	Rodrigo 36', 89'; Medrán (yellow card) 54'	Report	Pérez (yellow card) 48'; Machís 49'; Marín (yellow card) 57'; Guerrero (yellow card) 90+4'	Stadium: Mestalla; Attendance: 22,041; Referee: Mario Melero López
