= 2017–18 Granada CF season =

Granada CF
2017–18 season
- President: Jiang Lizhang
- Head coach: José Luis Oltra
- Stadium: Los Cármenes
- Segunda División: 10th
- Copa del Rey: Second round
- Top goalscorer: League: Darwin Machís (14 goals); All: Darwin Machís (14 goals)
Home colours	Away colours

During the 2017–18 season, Granada CF participated in the Spanish Segunda División, and the Copa del Rey.

== Squad ==
As of 1 September 2017

Note: Flags indicate national team as defined under FIFA eligibility rules; some limited exceptions apply. Players may hold more than one non-FIFA nationality.

No.	Pos.	Nation	Player
1	GK	(Portugal) POR	Rui Silva
2	DF	(Spain) ESP	Chico
3	DF	(Spain) ESP	Álex Martínez
4	DF	(England) ENG	Charlie I'Anson
5	DF	(Uruguay) URU	Hernán Menosse
6	DF	(Spain) ESP	Germán Sánchez
7	FW	(Colombia) COL	Adrián Ramos (on loan from Chongqing Lifan)
8	MF	(Spain) ESP	Raúl Baena (captain)
9	FW	(Albania) ALB	Rey Manaj (on loan from Inter Milan)
10	MF	(Spain) ESP	Antonio Puertas
11	FW	(Venezuela) VEN	Darwin Machís
12	MF	(Cameroon) CMR	Pierre Kunde (on loan from Atlético Madrid)
13	GK	(Spain) ESP	Javi Varas
14	DF	(Spain) ESP	Urtzi Iriondo (on loan from Athletic Bilbao)

No.	Pos.	Nation	Player
15	MF	(Spain) ESP	Pedro
16	DF	(Spain) ESP	Víctor Díaz
17	DF	(Spain) ESP	Quini
18	FW	(Spain) ESP	Joselu
19	MF	(Spain) ESP	Ángel Montoro
20	DF	(France) FRA	Matthieu Saunier
21	FW	(Portugal) POR	Licá
22	MF	(Peru) PER	Sergio Peña
23	MF	(Spain) ESP	Alberto Martín
29	DF	(Cameroon) CMR	Martin Hongla
24	MF	(Spain) ESP	Javier Espinosa (on loan from Levante)
35	GK	(Spain) ESP	Aarón Escandell

=== Transfers ===
- List of Spanish football transfers summer 2017#Granada

==== In ====
Date	Player	From	Type	Fee	Ref
13 June 2017	(Spain) Javi Varas	(Spain) Las Palmas	Transfer	Free	
14 June 2017	(Spain) Joselu	(Spain) Lugo	Transfer	Free	
16 June 2017	(Spain) Antonio Puertas	(Spain) Almería	Transfer	Free	
27 June 2017	(Spain) Álex Martínez	(Spain) Real Betis	Transfer	Free	
29 June 2017	(Spain) Quini	(Spain) Rayo Vallecano	Transfer	Free	
30 June 2017	(Venezuela) Darwin Machís	(Spain) Leganés	Loan return	Free	
30 June 2017	(Mali) Molla Wagué	(England) Leicester City	Loan return	Free	
30 June 2017	(Chile) Christian Bravo	(Chile) Universidad Católica	Loan return	Free	
1 July 2017	(Spain) Urtzi Iriondo	(Spain) Athletic Bilbao	Loan	Free	
3 July 2017	(Spain) Raúl Baena	(Spain) Rayo Vallecano	Transfer	Free	
4 July 2017	(Spain) Germán	(Spain) Tenerife	Transfer	€100K	
4 July 2017	(Spain) Víctor Díaz	(Spain) Leganés	Transfer	Free	
5 July 2017	(Uruguay) Hernán Menosse	(Colombia) Once Caldas	Transfer	€30K	
6 July 2017	(Spain) Pedro	(Spain) Elche	Transfer	Free	
7 July 2017	(England) Charlie Dean	(Spain) Valencia B	Transfer	Free	
7 July 2017	(Spain) Alberto Martín	(Spain) Leganés	Transfer	Free	
15 July 2017	(Spain) Ángel Montoro	(Spain) Las Palmas	Transfer	Free	
25 July 2017	(Cameroon) Pierre Kunde	(Spain) Atlético Madrid B	Loan	Free	
7 August 2017	(Spain) Javi Espinosa	(Spain) Levante	Loan	Free	

==== Out ====
Date	Player	To	Type	Fee	Ref
30 June 2017	(Ivory Coast) Victorien Angban	(England) Chelsea	Loan return	Free	
30 June 2017	(France) Jérémie Boga	(England) Chelsea	Loan return	Free	
30 June 2017	(Ukraine) Artem Kravets	(Ukraine) Dynamo Kyiv	Loan return	Free	
30 June 2017	(Mali) Aly Mallé	(England) Watford	Loan return	Free	
30 June 2017	(Mexico) Guillermo Ochoa	(Spain) Málaga	Loan return	Free	
30 June 2017	(Brazil) Andreas Pereira	(England) Manchester United	Loan return	Free	
30 June 2017	(Argentina) Ezequiel Ponce	(Italy) Roma	Loan return	Free	
30 June 2017	(Spain) Sergi Samper	(Spain) Barcelona	Loan return	Free	
30 June 2017	(Brazil) Gabriel Silva	(Italy) Udinese	Loan return	Free	
30 June 2017	(Uruguay) Gastón Silva	(Italy) Torino	Loan return	Free	
30 June 2017	(France) Franck Tabanou	(England) Swansea City	Loan return	Free	
30 June 2017	(Portugal) Rúben Vezo	(Spain) Valencia	Loan return	Free	
30 June 2017	(Nigeria) Uche Agbo	(England) Watford	Loan return	Free	
30 June 2017	(Spain) Héctor Hernández	(Spain) Real Sociedad	Loan return	Free	
30 June 2017	(Greece) Panagiotis Kone	(Italy) Udinese	Loan return	Free	
30 June 2017	(Ghana) Mubarak Wakaso	(Greece) Panathinaikos	Loan return	Free	
1 July 2017	(Spain) David Lombán	TBD		Free	
1 July 2017	(Iceland) Sverrir Ingi Ingason	(Russia) Rostov	Transfer	€2M	
1 July 2017	(Israel) Omer Atzili	(Israel) Maccabi Tel Aviv	Transfer	€1M	
1 July 2017	(Spain) Isaac Cuenca	(Israel) Hapoel Be'er Sheva	Transfer	Free	
1 July 2017	(Mali) Molla Wagué	(Italy) Udinese	Loan	Free	
1 July 2017	(Chile) Christian Bravo	(Chile) Unión Española	Loan	Free	
7 July 2017	(Spain) Juanan Entrena	(Spain) Alavés	Transfer	Free	
7 July 2017	(Morocco) Mehdi Carcela	(Greece) Olympiacos	Loan	Free	

== Competitions ==
=== Overall ===
Competition	Final position
Segunda División	10th
Copa del Rey	round of 64

=== Segunda Division ===
==== League table ====
Pos	Team	Pld	W	D	L	GF	GA	GD	Pts
8	Osasuna	42	16	16	10	44	34	+10	64 (Note: Osasuna finished ahead of Cádiz on head-to-head points: Cádiz 0–2 Osasuna, Osasuna 1–0 Cádiz)
9	Cádiz	42	16	16	10	42	29	+13	64
10	Granada	42	17	10	15	55	50	+5	61
11	Tenerife	42	15	14	13	58	50	+8	59
12	Lugo	42	15	10	17	39	48	−9	55

Source: La Liga
Rules for classification: 1) points; 2) head-to-head points; 3) head-to-head goal difference; 4) goal difference; 5) number of goals scored

==== Matches ====
Kickoff times are in CET. Win Draw Loss

Match	Opponent	Venue	Result
1	Albacete	H	0–0
2	Zaragoza	A	1–1
3	Barcelona B	H	2–2
4	Tenerife	A	2–2
5	Valladolid	A	1–2
6	Córdoba	H	3–1
7	Alcorcón	A	2–1
8	Lugo	H	2–0
9	Nàstic	A	0–2
10	Oviedo	H	2–0
11	Numancia	A	3–1
12	Lorca	H	4–1
13	Osasuna	A	0–0
14	Sevilla At	H	1–2
15	Cultural	A	1–1
16	Huesca	H	2–0
17	Rayo	A	0–1
18	Almería	H	3–2
19	Reus	A	0–0
20	Sporting Gijón	H	2–1
21	Cádiz	A	0–1

Match	Opponent	Venue	Result
22	Albacete	A	1–2
23	Zaragoza	H	2–1
24	Barcelona B	A	0–3
25	Tenerife	H	2–1
26	Valladolid	H	1–0
27	Córdoba	A	2–1
28	Alcorcón	H	2–0
29	Lugo	A	1–2
30	Nàstic	H	0–1
31	Oviedo	A	1–2
32	Numancia	H	1–0
33	Lorca	A	2–3
34	Osasuna	H	1–1
35	Sevilla At	A	0–0
36	Cultural	H	3–3
37	Huesca	A	1–2
38	Rayo	H	0–2
39	Almería	A	0–2
40	Reus	H	1–0
41	Sporting Gijón	A	1–2
42	Cádiz	H	2–1

=== Copa del Rey ===
6 September 2017 Second round	Zaragoza	3–0	Granada	Zaragoza
22:00	Borja Iglesias 60'; Eguaras 66'; Pombo 86'	Report		Stadium: La Romareda; Attendance: 10,221; Referee: Eiriz Mata

=== Appearances and goals ===
Last updated on 3 June 2018

No.	Pos	Nat	Player	Total		Segunda División		Copa del Rey	
No.	Pos	Nat	Player	Apps	Goals	Apps	Goals	Apps	Goals
Goalkeepers
1	GK	(Portugal) POR	Rui Silva	5	0	4	0	1	0
13	GK	(Spain) ESP	Javi Varas	38	0	38	0	0	0
35	GK	(Spain) ESP	Aarón Escandell	0	0	0	0	0	0
Defenders
2	DF	(Spain) ESP	Chico	29	0	29	0	0	0
3	DF	(Spain) ESP	Álex Martínez	42	3	42	3	0	0
5	DF	(Uruguay) URU	Hernán Menosse	11	0	11	0	0	0
6	DF	(Spain) ESP	Germán Sánchez	14	1	13+1	1	0	0
14	DF	(Spain) ESP	Urtzi Iriondo	1	0	0	0	1	0
16	DF	(Spain) ESP	Víctor Díaz	38	1	38	1	0	0
17	DF	(Spain) ESP	Quini	16	0	5+10	0	1	0
20	DF	(France) FRA	Matthieu Saunier	28	1	28	1	0	0
Midfielders
8	MF	(Spain) ESP	Raúl Baena	23	0	15+8	0	0	0
10	MF	(Spain) ESP	Antonio Puertas	20	0	6+13	0	1	0
12	MF	(Cameroon) CMR	Pierre Kunde	38	5	27+10	5	1	0
15	MF	(Spain) ESP	Pedro	38	7	30+8	7	0	0
19	MF	(Spain) ESP	Ángel Montoro	29	2	27+2	2	0	0
21	MF	(Denmark) DEN	Andrew Hjulsager	7	0	1+5	0	1	0
22	MF	(Peru) PER	Sergio Peña	19	1	14+5	1	0	0
23	MF	(Spain) ESP	Alberto Martín	32	0	20+11	0	1	0
24	MF	(Spain) ESP	Javier Espinosa	28	2	21+6	2	1	0
Forwards
4	FW	(Portugal) POR	Salvador Agra	14	0	9+5	0	0	0
7	FW	(Colombia) COL	Adrián Ramos	27	4	20+6	4	0+1	0
9	FW	(Albania) ALB	Rey Manaj	20	1	3+16	1	1	0
11	FW	(Venezuela) VEN	Darwin Machís	33	14	33	14	0	0
18	FW	(Spain) ESP	Joselu	32	9	15+16	9	0+1	0
21	FW	(Portugal) POR	Licá	2	0	0+2	0	0	0
Players who have made an appearance or had a squad number this season but have been loaned out or transferred
4	DF	(England) ENG	Charlie I'Anson	5	0	3+1	0	1	0
29	DF	(Cameroon) CMR	Martin Hongla	1	0	0	0	1	0
