= 2015–16 Real Oviedo season =

Real Oviedo
2015–16 season
- President: Jorge Menéndez Vallina
- Head coach: Sergio Egea
- Stadium: Carlos Tartiere
- Segunda División: 9th
- Copa del Rey: Third round
Home colours	Away colours	Third colours

The 2015–16 season is the 33rd season in Segunda División played by Real Oviedo, a Spanish football club based in Oviedo, Asturias. The team was promoted last season by winning Segunda División B

== Kit ==
Supplier: Hummel / Sponsor: TBA

== Current squad ==
Note: Flags indicate national team as defined under FIFA eligibility rules; some limited exceptions apply. Players may hold more than one non-FIFA nationality.

No.	Pos.	Nation	Player
1	GK	ESP	Esteban
3	DF	ESP	Dani Bautista
4	MF	ESP	Jonathan Vila
5	DF	ESP	David Fernández (3rd captain)
6	MF	ESP	Jon Erice (vice-captain)
7	MF	ESP	Néstor Susaeta
8	MF	ESP	Héctor Font
9	FW	ESP	Diego Cervero (captain)
10	FW	ESP	Miguel Linares
11	MF	ESP	Borja Valle
13	GK	ESP	Rubén Miño

No.	Pos.	Nation	Player
14	DF	ESP	Héctor Verdés
15	MF	CMR	Franck Omgba
16	FW	ESP	Toché
17	DF	ESP	José Manuel Fernández (on loan from Zaragoza)
18	DF	ESP	Borja Gómez
19	DF	ESP	Carlos Peña
20	MF	ESP	David Generelo (4th captain)
21	MF	ESP	Pablo Hervías (on loan from Real Sociedad)
22	FW	CIV	Mamadou Koné (on loan from Racing Santander)
23	MF	ESP	Edu Bedia
24	DF	ESP	Nacho López

=== In ===
No.	Pos.	Nat.	Name	Age	EU	Moving from	Type	Transfer window	Ends	Transfer fee	Source
	DF	(Spain)	Héctor Verdés	31	EU	Alcorcón	Transfer	Summer	2017	Free	Real Oviedo
	DF	(Spain)	Carlos Peña	31	EU	Valladolid	Transfer	Summer	2017	Free	Real Oviedo
	GK	(Spain)	Rubén Miño	26	EU	Mallorca	Transfer	Summer	2016	Free	Real Oviedo
	MF	(Spain)	Edu Bedia	26	EU	1860 Munich (Germany)	Transfer	Summer	2017	Free	Real Oviedo
	DF	(Spain)	Borja Gómez	27	EU	Lugo	Transfer	Summer	2017	Free	Real Oviedo
	FW	(Spain)	Toché	32	EU	Deportivo La Coruña	Transfer	Summer	2016	Free	Real Oviedo
	MF	(Spain)	Pablo Hervías	21	EU	Real Sociedad	Loan	Summer	2016	Free	Real Oviedo
	DF	(Spain)	José Manuel Fernández	25	EU	Zaragoza	Loan	Summer	2016	Free	Real Oviedo

=== Out ===
No.	Pos.	Nat.	Name	Age	EU	Moving to	Type	Transfer window	Transfer fee	Source
	DF	(England)	Charlie	22	EU	Elche	Loan Return	Summer	Free	
	FW	(Spain)	Dioni	33	EU	Unattached	Contract Ended	Summer	Free	
	DF	(Spain)	Manuel Redondo	29	EU	Unattached	Contract Ended	Summer	Free	
	DF	(Spain)	Sergio Sánchez	27	EU	Compostela	Contract Ended	Summer	Free	SD Compostela
	FW	(Spain)	Sergio García	25	EU	Cartagena	Contract Ended	Summer	Free	FC Cartagena
	MF	(Spain)	Eneko	31	EU	Tudelano	Contract Ended	Summer	Free	CD Tudelano

== Technical staff ==
Position	Staff
Manager	(Argentina) Sergio Egea
Assistant Manager	(Spain) Carlos María Rodriguez
Assistant Manager	(Spain) Roberto Robles
Goalkeeping Coach	(Spain) Damián Suárez
Physical Fitness Coach	(Spain) Ignacio Gonzalo
Physical Fitness Coach	(Spain) Pablo Gutiérrez
Director of Football	(Spain) Carmelo del Pozo
Delegate	(Spain) Santiago Méndez
Doctor	(Spain) Manuel Rodríguez
Physiotherapist	(Spain) Manuel Barreto
Material Supervisor	(Spain) Joaquín Silvino Aparicio
Head Coach Reserve Team	(Spain) Juan Fidalgo
Virtual Manager	(England) Spencer Owen

Last updated: August 2015
Source: Real Oviedo Official Website

== Competitions ==
=== Segunda División ===
==== League table ====
Pos	Team	Pld	W	D	L	GF	GA	GD	Pts
7	Alcorcón	42	18	10	14	48	44	+4	64 (Note: Osasuna ahead of Alcorcón and Zaragoza on head-to-head record; Osasuna 7 points, Alcorcón 6 points, Zaragoza 4 points)
8	Zaragoza	42	17	13	12	50	44	+6	64
9	Oviedo	42	16	11	15	52	51	+1	59
10	Numancia	42	13	18	11	57	51	+6	57 (Note: Numancia ahead of Elche on overall goal difference; Numancia +6, Elche -6)
11	Elche	42	13	18	11	40	46	−6	57

Source: LFP
Rules for classification: 1) points; 2) head-to-head points; 3) head-to-head goal difference; 4) goal difference; 5) number of goals scored

==== Results summary ====
Overall								Home						Away					
Pld	W	D	L	GF	GA	GD	Pts	W	D	L	GF	GA	GD	W	D	L	GF	GA	GD
0	0	0	0	0	0	0	0	0	0	0	0	0	0	0	0	0	0	0	0

Last updated: 09 August 2015.
Source: Matches

== See also ==
- 2015–16 Segunda División B
- 2015–16 Copa del Rey
