= Rubén Miño =

Spanish footballer (born 1989)

Personal information
- Full name: Rubén Miño Peralta
- Date of birth: 18 January 1989 (age 37)
- Place of birth: Cornellà, Spain
- Height: 1.91 m (6 ft 3 in)
- Position: Goalkeeper

Youth career
- 1998–2000: Cornellà
- 2000–2008: Barcelona
- 2004–2006: → Cornellà (loan)

Senior career*
Years	Team	Apps	(Gls)
2008–2012	Barcelona B	71	(0)
2010	Barcelona	0	(0)
2012–2015	Mallorca	42	(0)
2015–2016	Oviedo	13	(0)
2016–2017	AEK Larnaca	21	(0)
2017–2018	Albacete	0	(0)
2019	Politehnica Iași	10	(0)
2019–2021	Logroñés	37	(0)
2021–2022	Talavera	8	(0)
2023	Algeciras	16	(0)
2023–2025	Cornellà	49	(0)

International career
2009–2011	Spain U21	2	(0)
- * Club domestic league appearances and goals as of 23:52, 18 September 2025 (UTC)

Rubén Miño Peralta (born 18 January 1989) is a Spanish professional footballer who plays as a goalkeeper.

== Club career ==
Born in Cornellà de Llobregat, Barcelona, Catalonia, Miño moved to FC Barcelona's youth system, La Masia, at the age of 11. Four years later, he served a two-season loan at local UE Cornellà in the regional leagues.

In 2008, Miño returned as starter of Barça's reserves, as they had just returned to the Segunda División B under young manager Pep Guardiola. He made his official debut against SCR Santa Eulàlia on 31 August of that year (1–0 away loss).

On 13 August 2010, due to an injury to José Manuel Pinto and the need to rest Víctor Valdés, Miño was included in the nineteen-man Barcelona squad to face Sevilla FC in the Supercopa de España; on 14 August, he played the full 90 minutes in a 3–1 away defeat.

Miño totalled 25 Segunda División games over two full seasons with the B's. On 5 July 2012, he left Barcelona and signed for fellow La Liga club RCD Mallorca. He made his debut in the competition on 18 January 2013, featuring 30 minutes in the 3–2 loss at RCD Espanyol after coming on as a substitute for the injured Dudu Aouate.

On 2 July 2015, after featuring only six times during the campaign, Miño signed a one-year contract with Real Oviedo, newly promoted to the second division. On 4 December 2017, after one year in the Cypriot First Division with AEK Larnaca FC, he joined Spanish second-tier team Albacete Balompié until the following 30 June.

In January 2019, free agent Miño moved to FC Politehnica Iași of the Romanian Liga I. He returned to his homeland shortly after, agreeing to a deal at UD Logroñés. With the latter side, as the 2019–20 season was curtailed due to the COVID-19 pandemic, he achieved a first-ever promotion to division two, notably earning player of the match accolades in the 3–2 penalty shoot-out victory over CD Castellón in the play-offs.

Miño signed for CF Talavera de la Reina of the Primera División RFEF in August 2021. He continued competing at that level the following seasons, with Algeciras CF and Cornellà.

== International career ==
On 6 February 2009, Miño received his first call-up for the Spain under-21 team. The first of his two caps arrived on 27 March of that year, in a 2–1 friendly defeat to the Republic of Ireland.

== Career statistics ==
As of match played 30 June 2025

Appearances and goals by club, season and competition
Club	Season	League			Cup		Europe		Other		Total	
Club	Season	Division	Apps	Goals	Apps	Goals	Apps	Goals	Apps	Goals	Apps	Goals
Barcelona B	2008–09	Segunda División B	29	0	—		—		—		29	0
Barcelona B	2009–10	Segunda División B	17	0	—		—		3 (Note: Appearances in Segunda División B play-offs)	0	20	0
Barcelona B	2010–11	Segunda División	15	0	—		—		—		15	0
Barcelona B	2011–12	Segunda División	10	0	—		—		—		10	0
Barcelona B	Total		71	0	—		—		3	0	74	0
Barcelona	2010–11	La Liga	0	0	0	0	0	0	1 (Note: Appearance in Supercopa de España)	0	1	0
Mallorca	2012–13	La Liga	1	0	0	0	—		—		1	0
Mallorca	2013–14	Segunda División	35	0	1	0	—		—		36	0
Mallorca	2014–15	Segunda División	6	0	0	0	—		—		6	0
Mallorca	Total		42	0	1	0	—		—		43	0
Oviedo	2015–16	Segunda División	13	0	2	0	—		—		15	0
AEK Larnaca	2016–17	Cypriot First Division	21	0	0	0	6 (Note: Appearances in UEFA Europa League)	0	—		27	0
Albacete	2017–18	Segunda División	0	0	—		—		—		0	0
Politehnica Iași	2018–19	Liga I	10	0	—		—		—		10	0
Logroñés	2019–20	Segunda División B	27	0	0	0	—		1	0	28	0
Logroñés	2020–21	Segunda División	10	0	0	0	—		—		10	0
Logroñés	Total		37	0	0	0	—		1	0	38	0
Talavera	2021–22	Primera División RFEF	8	0	2	0	—		—		10	0
Algeciras	2022–23	Primera Federación	16	0	—		—		—		16	0
Cornellà	2023–24	Primera Federación	20	0	0	0	—		—		20	0
Cornellà	2024–25	Segunda Federación	29	0	3	0	—		—		32	0
Cornellà	Total		49	0	3	0	—		—		52	0
Career total			267	0	8	0	6	0	5	0	286	0

== Honours ==
Barcelona

- Supercopa de España: 2010
- FIFA Club World Cup: 2009

Spain U21

- UEFA European Under-21 Championship: 2011
