= Mamadou Koné (footballer, born 1991) =

Ivorian footballer (born 1991)

Personal information
- Full name: Mamadou Koné
- Date of birth: 25 December 1991 (age 34)
- Place of birth: Bingerville, Ivory Coast
- Height: 1.77 m (5 ft 10 in)
- Position: Forward

Youth career
- Bingerville

Senior career*
Years	Team	Apps	(Gls)
2010–2012	Racing B	30	(12)
2011–2016	Racing Santander	90	(30)
2015–2016	→ Oviedo (loan)	34	(5)
2016–2020	Leganés	5	(0)
2018	→ Eupen (loan)	15	(5)
2018–2019	→ Málaga (loan)	9	(2)
2019–2020	→ Deportivo La Coruña (loan)	22	(4)
2020–2022	Eupen	20	(0)
2022–2024	Deinze	18	(3)
- * Club domestic league appearances and goals as of 15:59, 26 December 2024 (UTC)

Mamadou Koné (born 25 December 1991) is an Ivorian professional footballer who plays as a forward.

== Club career ==
Born in Bingerville, Koné was a youth product of local ES Bingerville. He moved to Racing de Santander in 2010 at the age of 18 for just €240,000, being initially assigned to the reserves in Tercera División. He made his first-team – and La Liga – debut on 15 October 2011, starting in a 3–0 away loss against FC Barcelona.

Koné was definitely promoted to the Cantabrians’ main squad for the 2012–13 season. He scored five goals in 35 Segunda División appearances, and the club suffered a second consecutive relegation; his first came on 22 September 2012, the only at CD Mirandés.

Koné netted 18 times in the 2013–14 campaign, helping to return the team to the second tier in their first attempt. On 17 February 2015, as he again was team top scorer, he suffered a serious knee injury, being sidelined for six months.

On 18 August 2015, Koné moved to Real Oviedo of the same league in a one-year loan, with an option to make the move permanent at the end of the season. On 25 August of the following year, he signed a permanent five-year contract with top-flight CD Leganés.

Koné moved to the Belgian Pro League on 10 January 2018, being loaned to K.A.S. Eupen until June. On 17 August, he returned to Spain and its second division after joining Málaga CF also in a temporary deal.

On 19 July 2019, Koné signed with Deportivo de La Coruña on another one-year loan. He scored on his debut on 18 August to help the hosts defeat his former side Oviedo 3–2, but the season ended in relegation to the Segunda División B.

Koné returned to Eupen in the summer of 2020, on a two-year contract. On 7 June 2022, he stayed in Belgium but dropped down to the Challenger Pro League on a two-year deal at K.M.S.K. Deinze; he left the latter club in December 2024, after it was declared bankrupt and ceased operations.

== Career statistics ==
As of 4 February 2018

Appearances and goals by club, season and competition
Club	Season	League			National Cup		Other		Total	
Club	Season	Division	Apps	Goals	Apps	Goals	Apps	Goals	Apps	Goals
Racing Santander	2011–12	La Liga	6	0	0	0	—		6	0
Racing Santander	2012–13	Segunda División	35	5	2	0	—		37	5
Racing Santander	2013–14	Segunda División B	34	18	7	3	—		41	21
Racing Santander	2014–15	Segunda División	15	7	0	0	—		15	7
Racing Santander	Total		90	30	9	3	0	0	99	33
Racing B	2012–13	Segunda División B	4	1	0	0	0	0	4	1
Oviedo (loan)	2015–16	Segunda División	34	5	1	1	—		35	6
Leganés	2016–17	La Liga	5	0	2	0	—		7	0
Eupen (loan)	2017–18	Belgian Pro League	5	2	0	0	0	0	5	2
Career total			138	38	12	4	0	0	150	42
