= Urtzi Iriondo =

Spanish footballer

Personal information
- Full name: Urtzi Iriondo Petralanda
- Date of birth: 30 January 1995 (age 31)
- Place of birth: Zeberio, Spain
- Height: 1.67 m (5 ft 5 1/2 in)
- Position: Left back

Youth career
- 2005–2013: Athletic Bilbao

Senior career*
Years	Team	Apps	(Gls)
2013–2014	Basconia	32	(1)
2014–2018	Bilbao Athletic	40	(2)
2016–2017	→ Elche (loan)	21	(0)
2017–2018	→ Granada (loan)	0	(0)
2018–2019	Union SG	14	(0)
2019–2021	Barakaldo	43	(1)
2022	Xerez Deportivo	12	(0)
2022–2023	Gernika	21	(0)
2024	Real Jaén	12	(0)
- * Club domestic league appearances and goals as of 8 June 2024

Urtzi Iriondo Petralanda (born 30 January 1995) is a Spanish professional footballer who plays as a left back.

== Club career ==
Born in Zeberio, Biscay, Basque Country, Iriondo joined Athletic Bilbao's youth setup in 2005, aged ten. Iriondo made his debuts as a senior with the farm team in the 2013–14 campaign, in Tercera División.

On 26 May 2014, Iriondo was promoted to the reserves in Segunda División B. He contributed with 14 appearances and one goal during the season, as the B-side returned to Segunda División after a 19-year absence.

Iriondo made his professional debut on 24 August 2015, starting in a 0–1 home loss against Girona FC. He scored his first goal as a professional on 24 April of the following year, netting his team's second in a 2–3 loss at UD Almería.

On 1 July 2016, Iriondo was loaned to Elche CF also in the second level, for one year. The following 30 June, after suffering relegation, he moved to fellow league team Granada CF also on a temporary one-year deal.

== Personal life ==
Iriondo's identical twin brother Eneko Iriondo is also a footballer. A midfielder, he was also part of the Athletic youth setup.
