= Zakaria Bakkali =

Belgian footballer (born 1996)

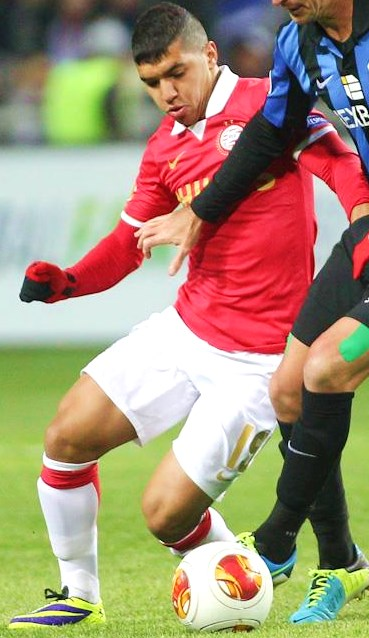
- Bakkali playing for PSV in 2013

Personal information
- Date of birth: 26 January 1996 (age 30)
- Place of birth: Liège, Belgium
- Height: 1.68 m (5 ft 6 in)
- Position: Winger

Team information
- Current team: IR Tanger
- Number: 99

Youth career
- 2003–2005: RFC Liège
- 2005–2008: Standard Liège
- 2008–2013: PSV

Senior career*
Years	Team	Apps	(Gls)
2013–2015	PSV	16	(3)
2014–2015	Jong PSV	6	(1)
2015–2018	Valencia	34	(2)
2017–2018	→ Deportivo La Coruña (loan)	23	(0)
2018–2022	Anderlecht	24	(2)
2021	→ Beerschot (loan)	4	(0)
2022–2024	RKC Waalwijk	36	(3)
2025–	IR Tanger	7	(1)

International career
2011	Belgium U15	6	(6)
2011–2012	Belgium U16	4	(4)
2012–2013	Belgium U17	12	(7)
2013–2016	Belgium U21	9	(1)
2013–2015	Belgium	2	(0)
- * Club domestic league appearances and goals as of 9 March 2025

Zakaria Bakkali (born 26 January 1996) is a Belgian professional footballer who plays as a winger for IR Tanger.

He is most famous for becoming the youngest Eredivisie player of all-time to score a hat-trick, at the age of 17 years and 196 days.

== Club career ==
=== PSV ===
Born in Liège to immigrant parents from Morocco, after starting his footballing career at the youth academies of RFC Liège and later Standard Liège, Bakkali transferred to PSV Eindhoven of the Netherlands at the age of 12.

On 30 July 2013, Bakkali made his debut for PSV against Zulte Waregem in a UEFA Champions League qualifying match. He made his Eredivisie debut against ADO Den Haag in the opening game of the season on 3 August. On 7 August, he scored his first senior goal in the second-leg of the Champions League tie against Zulte in a 3–0 win. On 10 August, he scored a hat-trick in PSV's 5–0 victory over NEC Nijmegen at the Philips Stadion, becoming the youngest player to score a hat-trick in Eredivisie history.

In the middle of 2014, Bakkali was set for a move to Atlético Madrid for a fee of around €2-3 million, but the move fell through. After rejecting a new contract from PSV, Bakkali was banished from the first-team, with PSV agreeing to sell him in the winter transfer window. Scottish club Celtic offered £750,000 on transfer deadline day for Bakkali, but a PSV spokesman stated that "this deadline day no deal will be closed by PSV with any team for this particular player".

=== Valencia ===
On 6 July 2015, Bakkali moved to La Liga club Valencia CF, after agreeing to a five-year deal. He made his unofficial debut against Werder Bremen on 11 July. He scored his first goal for Valencia on 31 October in a 3–0 home win over local rivals Levante. On 14 July 2017, he was loaned to fellow league team Deportivo de La Coruña for one year.

=== Anderlecht ===
On 4 July 2018, Bakkali returned to Belgium to sign with R.S.C. Anderlecht.

==== Loan to Beerschot ====
On 1 February 2021, Bakkali moved to Belgium club Beerschot, on a loan deal until the end of the season. The deal included a purchase option.

=== RKC Waalwijk ===
Bakkali joined Eredivisie club RKC Waalwijk on 3 August 2022, signing a two-year contract.

== International career ==
After his breakthrough into the PSV first team, Belgium senior coach Marc Wilmots selected him in his 25-man squad for the friendly match against France. Due to a training injury sustained the day before the game, he was pulled out of the squad. With his dual nationality and without full international appearances, he still had the choice to play for the Morocco national football team, but on 7 October 2013 (shortly before Belgium's last two 2014 FIFA World Cup qualifiers) he formally opted for the Red Devils. He was recalled to the Belgium squad in October 2015 for Euro 2016 qualifiers against Andorra and Israel.

== Career statistics ==
=== Club ===
As of match played 23 February 2020

Appearances and goals by club, season and competition
Club	Season	League			Cup		Europe		Other		Total	
Club	Season	Division	Apps	Goals	Apps	Goals	Apps	Goals	Apps	Goals	Apps	Goals
PSV	2013–14	Eredivisie	16	3	2	0	4	1	0	0	22	4
PSV	2014–15	Eredivisie	0	0	0	0	0	0	0	0	0	0
PSV	Total		16	3	2	0	4	1	0	0	22	4
Jong PSV	2013–14	Eerste Divisie	1	0	—		—		—		1	0
Jong PSV	2014–15	Eerste Divisie	5	1	—		—		—		5	1
Jong PSV	Total		6	1	0	0	0	0	0	0	6	1
Valencia	2015–16	La Liga	16	1	3	0	0	0	0	0	19	1
Valencia	2016–17	La Liga	18	1	3	1	—		—		21	2
Valencia	Total		34	2	6	1	0	0	0	0	40	3
Deportivo de La Coruña	2017–18	La Liga	23	0	1	0	—		—		24	0
Anderlecht	2018–19	Belgian First Division A	18	1	0	0	—		—		18	1
Anderlecht	2019–20	Belgian First Division A	4	1	0	0	—		—		4	1
Anderlecht	Total		22	2	0	0	0	0	0	0	22	2
Career total			101	8	9	1	4	1	0	0	114	10

=== International ===
As of match played 10 October 2015

Appearances and goals by national team and year
National team	Year	Apps	Goals
Belgium	2013	1	0
Belgium	2014	0	0
Belgium	2015	1	0
Total		2	0
