= Miguel Ángel Guerrero =

Spanish association footballer

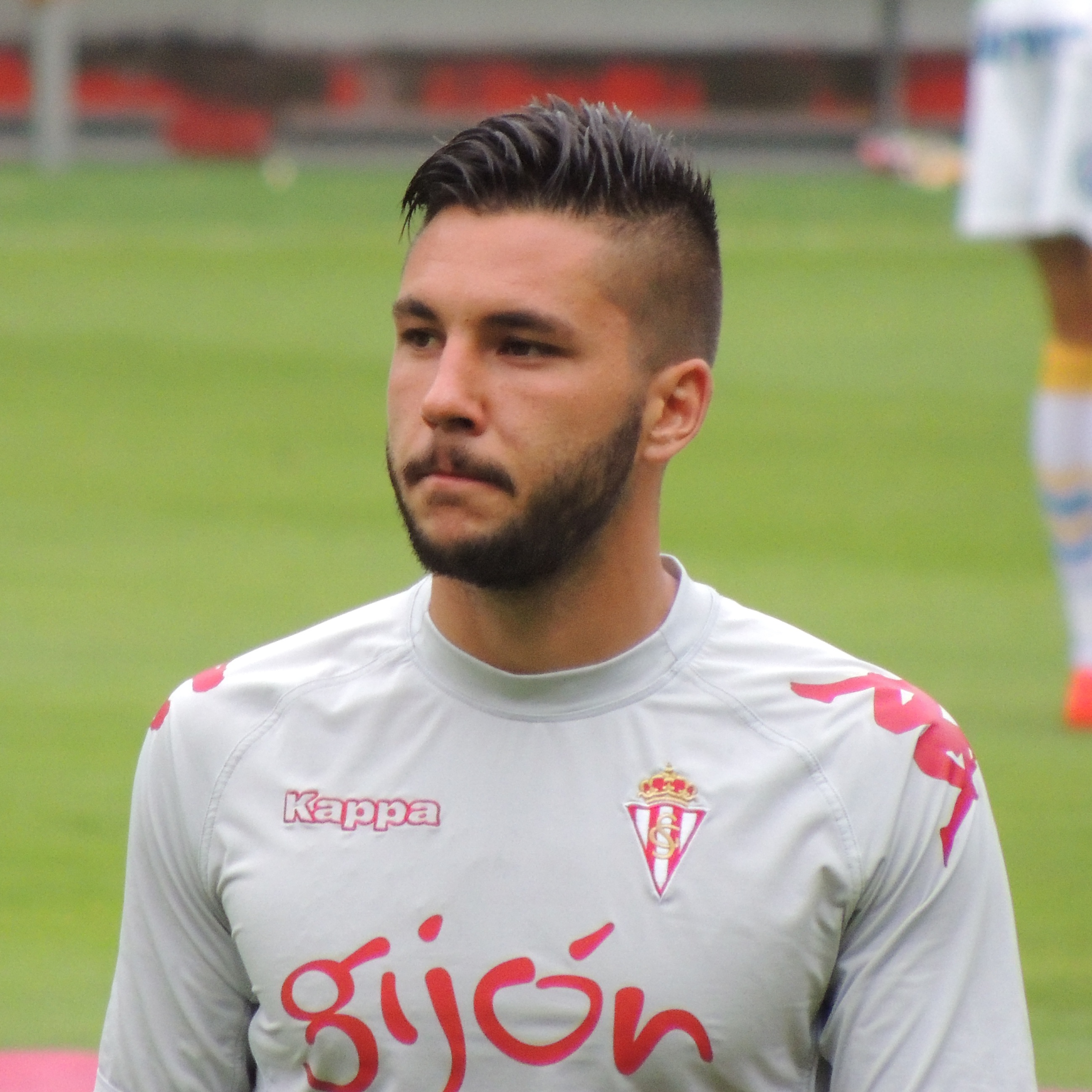
- Guerrero with Sporting Gijón in 2014

Personal information
- Full name: Miguel Ángel Guerrero Martín
- Date of birth: 12 July 1990 (age 36)
- Place of birth: Toledo, Spain
- Height: 1.82 m (6 ft 0 in)
- Position: Forward

Youth career
- 1996–1999: Atlético Madrid
- 1999–2000: Real Madrid
- 2000–2007: Getafe
- 2007–2008: Toledo
- 2008–2009: Rayo Vallecano

Senior career*
Years	Team	Apps	(Gls)
2009–2011	Albacete B	60	(19)
2010	Albacete	2	(0)
2011–2013	Sporting Gijón B	51	(29)
2012–2016	Sporting Gijón	91	(16)
2016–2018	Leganés	53	(9)
2018–2020	Olympiacos	37	(9)
2020	→ Leganés (loan)	13	(1)
2020–2021	Nottingham Forest	9	(0)
2021	Rayo Vallecano	16	(1)
2021–2022	Ibiza	34	(2)
2022–2023	OFI	11	(0)
2023–2024	Anorthosis	33	(16)
2025–2026	Langreo	26	(8)
- * Club domestic league appearances and goals as of 19:36, 29 January 2026 (UTC)

Miguel Ángel Guerrero Martín (born 12 July 1990) is a Spanish professional footballer who plays as a forward.

He played 89 La Liga games and scored 12 goals for Sporting de Gijón and Leganés, as well as 117 appearances and 17 goals in the Segunda División for four teams including Sporting. Abroad, he represented Olympiacos and OFI in the Super League Greece, as well as having spells in England and Cyprus.

== Club career ==
=== Albacete ===
Born in Toledo, Castilla–La Mancha, Guerrero started his senior career with Albacete Balompié's reserves, spending two full seasons in the Tercera División after having represented a host of clubs as a youth.

He made his official debut with the first team on 9 January 2010, appearing as a late substitute in a 0–0 away draw against Recreativo de Huelva in the Segunda División.

=== Sporting Gijón ===
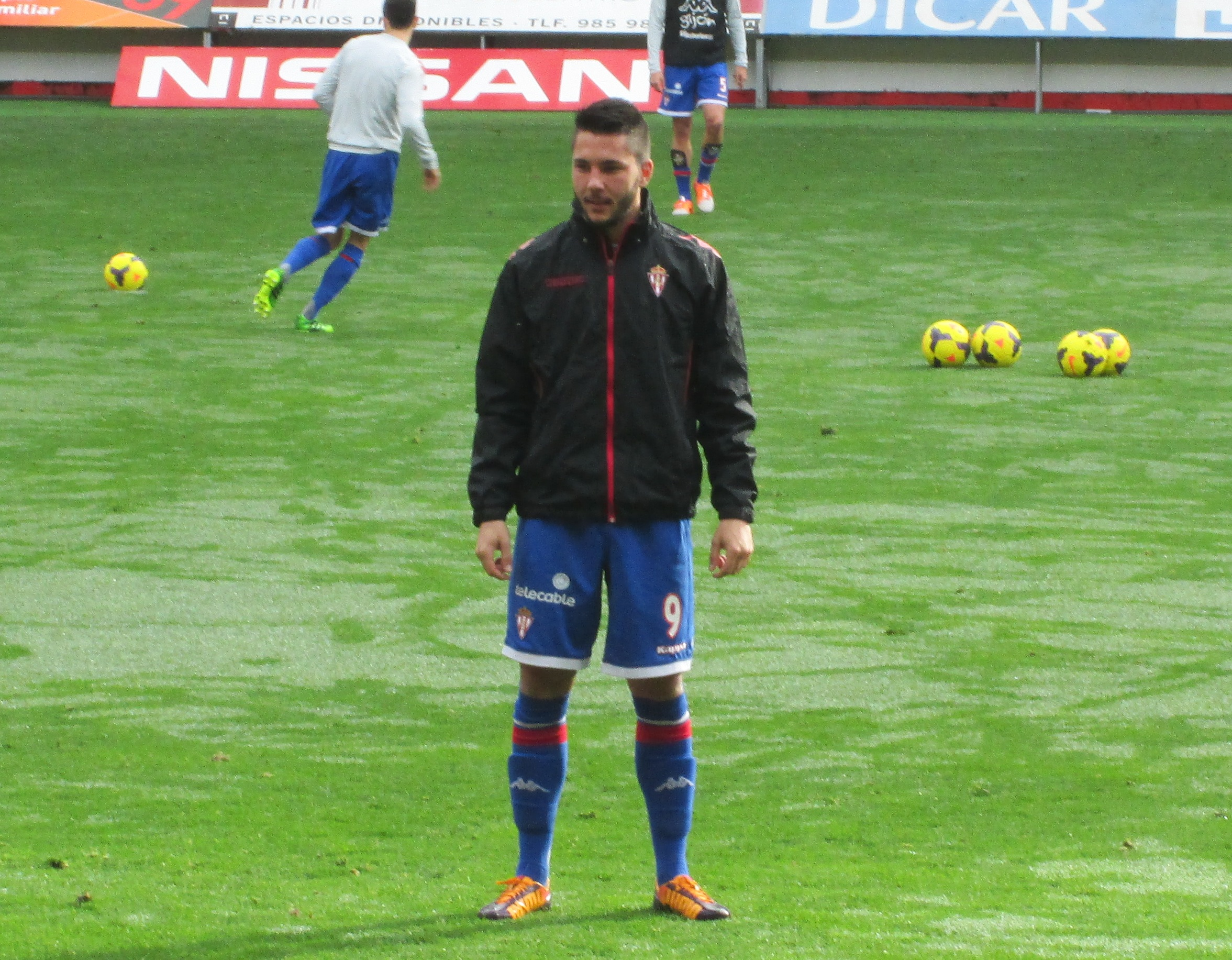
Guerrero warming up with Sporting de Gijón in 2014

In the summer of 2011, Guerrero joined Sporting de Gijón, again initially being assigned to the B side, this time in Segunda División B. He made his official debut with the Asturians' main squad on 19 August 2012, playing 25 minutes in a 2–0 loss at CD Numancia.

On 6 January 2013, in a local derby against Real Oviedo, Guerrero scored all of Sporting B's goals in a 4–1 home victory. Roughly one month later, he scored his first goal for the first team, the opening goal in a 2–1 away win over CD Lugo.

After being promoted to the main squad in 2013, Guerrero was an important attacking player in the 2014–15 campaign, scoring 11 goals in 36 appearances for the runners-up. Highlights included braces against CD Lugo and Racing de Santander, both in May 2015.

Guerrero made his La Liga debut on 23 August 2015, starting in a 0–0 home draw against Real Madrid. He scored for the first time in the top flight on 19 October, equalising late on in a 3–3 home draw with Granada CF, and added another the following 12 February to open a 2–2 draw against Rayo Vallecano also at El Molinón as his team avoided relegation at that adversary's expense.

=== Leganés ===
On 27 June 2016, Guerrero signed a two-year deal with the option for a third at CD Leganés, newly promoted to the top tier. He scored five goals from 31 appearances in his first season, helping the club to retain its league status.

=== Olympiacos ===
On 13 June 2018, Guerrero moved abroad for the first time in his career after agreeing to a three-year contract with Olympiacos FC, with a rumoured annual salary of €400,000. On 9 August, he scored a brace in a 4–0 home defeat of FC Luzern in the UEFA Europa League third qualifying round.

On 30 July 2019, Guerrero scored after a solo run in the 4–0 home victory over FC Viktoria Plzeň in the second qualifying round of the UEFA Champions League. He repeated the feat in the same competition on 21 August, as the hosts defeated FC Krasnodar in the play-off round.

Guerrero signed for six months with Leganés on 31 January 2020, with the deal including a €2.5 million buyout clause.

=== Nottingham Forest ===
On 4 September 2020, Guerrero joined EFL Championship side Nottingham Forest for an undisclosed fee; manager Sabri Lamouchi was reportedly not interested in signing him but felt that he had no choice but to agree to the transfer as it came under the recommendation of Evangelos Marinakis, who owned both clubs. He made his debut as a substitute in a 2–0 home loss against Cardiff City on 19 September, and his first start came the following month in a 1–0 defeat at Middlesbrough.

=== Rayo Vallecano ===
Guerrero signed with Rayo Vallecano on 1 February 2021, for an undisclosed fee. He scored his only goal for the sixth-placed team – eventually promoted in the play-offs – on the 27th, equalising the 1–1 home draw with SD Ponferradina.

=== Later career ===
On 12 August 2021, Guerrero moved to second-tier newcomers UD Ibiza on a two-year deal. Halfway through the contract, he was released so the Balearic side could sign former Spain international Nolito and he returned to Greece's top flight at OFI Crete FC. Remaining in the eastern Mediterranean, he moved again in January 2023 to Anorthosis Famagusta FC of the Cypriot First Division, signing until the summer of 2024.

Guerrero joined Segunda Federación club UP Langreo in February 2025. He left 11 months later, amidst rumours he intended to retire altogether.

== Career statistics ==
As of match played 14 April 2024

Appearances and goals by club, season and competition
Club	Season	League			Cup		League Cup		Other		Total	
Club	Season	Division	Apps	Goals	Apps	Goals	Apps	Goals	Apps	Goals	Apps	Goals
Albacete	2009–10	Segunda División	2	0	0	0	—		—		2	0
Albacete	2010–11	Segunda División	0	0	0	0	—		—		0	0
Albacete	Total		2	0	0	0	—		—		2	0
Sporting Gijón B	2011–12	Segunda División B	30	13	—		—		—		30	13
Sporting Gijón B	2012–13	Segunda División B	21	16	—		—		—		21	16
Sporting Gijón B	Total		51	29	—		—		—		51	29
Sporting Gijón	2012–13	Segunda División	18	2	0	0	—		—		18	2
Sporting Gijón	2013–14	Segunda División	14	1	1	0	—		—		15	1
Sporting Gijón	2014–15	Segunda División	36	11	1	0	—		—		37	11
Sporting Gijón	2015–16	La Liga	23	2	2	0	—		—		25	2
Sporting Gijón	Total		91	16	4	0	—		—		95	16
Leganés	2016–17	La Liga	31	5	2	0	—		—		33	5
Leganés	2017–18	La Liga	22	4	0	0	—		—		22	4
Leganés	Total		53	9	2	0	—		—		55	9
Olympiacos	2018–19	Super League Greece	23	7	3	0	—		9 (Note: Appearances in UEFA Europa League)	4	35	11
Olympiacos	2019–20	Super League Greece	14	2	2	2	—		11 (Note: Appearances in UEFA Champions League)	2	27	6
Olympiacos	Total		37	9	5	2	—		20	6	62	17
Leganés	2019–20	La Liga	13	1	0	0	—		—		13	1
Nottingham Forest	2020–21	EFL Championship	9	0	2	0	—		—		11	0
Rayo Vallecano	2020–21	Segunda División	16	1	0	0	—		—		16	1
Ibiza	2021–22	Segunda División	34	2	2	0	—		—		36	2
OFI	2022–23	Super League Greece	11	0	1	0	—		—		12	0
Anorthosis	2022–23	Cypriot First Division	20	10	2	0	—		—		22	10
Anorthosis	2023–24	Cypriot First Division	13	6	1	1	—		—		14	7
Anorthosis	Total		33	16	3	1	0	0	0	0	36	17
Career total			350	83	19	3	0	0	20	6	389	92

== Honours ==
Olympiacos

- Super League Greece: 2019–20
- Greek Football Cup: 2019–20
