= Hernán Menosse =

Uruguayan footballer (born 1987)

Personal information
- Full name: Hernán Fabián Mennose Acosta
- Date of birth: 28 April 1987 (age 39)
- Place of birth: San Carlos, Uruguay
- Height: 1.85 m (6 ft 1 in)
- Position: Centre-back

Team information
- Current team: Deportivo Maldonado
- Number: 3

Youth career
- Libertad San Carlos

Senior career*
Years	Team	Apps	(Gls)
2007–2009	Libertad San Carlos		
2009–2012	Atenas San Carlos		
2012–2015	Montevideo Wanderers	30	(1)
2013–2015	→ Recreativo (loan)	61	(7)
2015–2017	Once Caldas	33	(1)
2016–2017	→ Rosario Central (loan)	14	(0)
2017–2018	Granada	11	(0)
2018–2019	Belgrano	11	(0)
2019	Lugo	3	(0)
2019	Defensor Sporting	18	(1)
2020–2022	Deportivo Cali	63	(0)
2022–2023	Peñarol	56	(1)
2024–	Deportivo Maldonado	14	(0)
- * Club domestic league appearances and goals as of March 21, 2023

Jorge Hernán Menosse Acosta (born 28 April 1987) is a Uruguayan professional footballer who plays as a centre-back for Deportivo Maldonado.

== Club career ==
Born in San Carlos, Menosse played youth football with local CA Libertad de San Carlos, making his senior debuts in the 2007–2008 season. In 2009, he joined Primera División side CA Atenas de San Carlos, but his side was relegated to Segunda División at the end of the campaign nonetheless.

In January 2012 Menosse returned to the top division, after agreeing to a deal with Montevideo Wanderers FC. He appeared regularly, scoring his first goal for the club on 28 April 2013, in a 2–0 away win against CA Bella Vista.

On 2 July 2013, Menosse signed a one-year loan deal with Recreativo de Huelva, in Spanish Segunda División. On 14 September he played his first game abroad, starting in a 3–0 away win over CD Mirandés.

Menosse scored his first goal for Recre on 16 November 2013, in a 3–3 draw at Deportivo Alavés. After appearing regularly during the campaign, his loan was renewed for a further year the following 23 June.

Menosse left the club after their relegation in 2015, and subsequently represented Once Caldas and Rosario Central before returning to Spain on 5 July 2017, after agreeing to a two-year contract with Granada CF. After appearing sparingly, he moved to Belgrano roughly one year later.

On 28 January 2019, Menosse signed a six-month contract with CD Lugo.
