= Franck Omgba =

Cameroonian footballer

Personal information
- Full name: Emmanuel Franck Omgba Opono Edoa
- Date of birth: 4 July 1992 (age 34)
- Place of birth: Yaoundé, Cameroon
- Height: 1.71 m (5 ft 7 in)
- Position: Midfielder

Youth career
- APEJES
- 2009–2011: Torrellano Illice

Senior career*
Years	Team	Apps	(Gls)
2010–2011	Torrellano Illice	13	(0)
2011–2012	Huracán	14	(0)
2012	Girona	0	(0)
2012–2014	Elche Ilicitano	64	(0)
2014–2016	Oviedo	43	(7)
2016–2017	Hércules	20	(0)
2017–2019	Alcoyano	38	(0)
2020	Mérida	0	(0)

International career
2010	Cameroon U20	3	(0)
- * Club domestic league appearances and goals as of 22:11, 2 January 2021 (UTC)

Emmanuel Franck Omgba Opono Edoa (born 4 July 1992) is a Cameroonian footballer who most recently played for Spanish club Mérida AD as a midfielder.

== Club career ==
Born in Yaoundé, Omgba joined Torrellano Illice CF's youth setup in 2009 at the age of 16, after representing APEJES Academy, and made his debuts as a senior in the following year, in Tercera División. On 31 August 2011, after making the whole pre-season with Elche CF, he signed a contract with Huracán Valencia CF in Segunda División B.

On 30 December 2011 Omgba was transferred to Segunda División side Girona FC. However, he could not play for the Catalans after having bureaucratic problems, and was released in June of the following year.

On 18 July 2012 Omgba returned to the Franjiverdes, being assigned to the reserves in the fourth level. He was an undisputed starter during his two-year spell at the club, achieving promotion to the third tier in his first campaign.

On 17 July 2014 Omgba signed a one-year deal with Real Oviedo, also in the third division. He scored a career-best seven goals during the season, as his side returned to Segunda División after a 12-year absence; one of his goals, the first in a 3–2 away win against UD Somozas, was the club's 5000th.

Omgba made his professional debut on 13 September 2015, starting in a 2–0 away win against CD Tenerife.

== International career ==
Omgba has represented Cameroon at under-20 level.

== Honours ==
Oviedo

- Segunda División B: 2014–15
