= Darwin Machís =

Venezuelan footballer (born 1993)

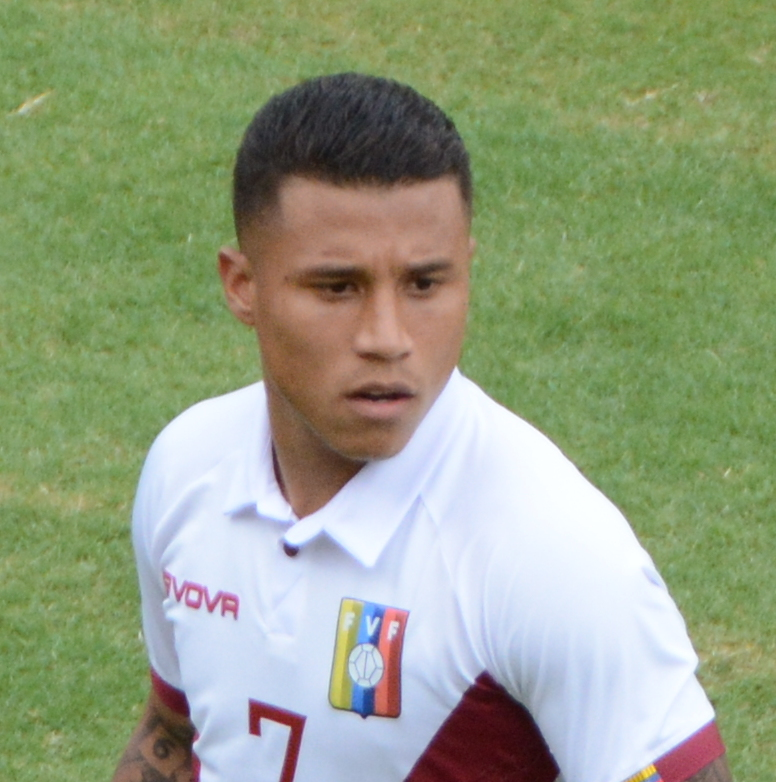
- Machís with Venezuela in 2019

Personal information
- Full name: Darwin Daniel Machís Marcano
- Date of birth: 7 February 1993 (age 33)
- Place of birth: Tucupita, Venezuela
- Height: 1.70 m (5 ft 7 in)
- Position: Left winger

Team information
- Current team: Carabobo

Senior career*
Years	Team	Apps	(Gls)
2011–2012	Mineros de Guayana	28	(8)
2012–2015	Granada B	49	(17)
2012–2018	Granada	40	(14)
2013	→ Vitória Guimarães B (loan)	8	(1)
2013	→ Vitória Guimarães (loan)	3	(0)
2014	→ Hércules (loan)	3	(0)
2015–2016	→ Huesca (loan)	38	(9)
2016–2017	→ Leganés (loan)	27	(1)
2018–2019	Udinese	13	(0)
2019	→ Cádiz (loan)	15	(8)
2019–2022	Granada	93	(16)
2022–2023	Juárez	11	(1)
2023–2025	Valladolid	29	(0)
2023–2024	→ Cádiz (loan)	21	(4)
2025	Universidad Central	6	(3)
2026	América de Cali	15	(0)
2026-	Carabobo	3	(1)

International career^{‡}
2013	Venezuela U20	3	(0)
2011–	Venezuela	52	(11)
- * Club domestic league appearances and goals as of 27 May 2025 ‡ National team caps and goals as of 15 October 2024 (UTC)

Darwin Daniel Machís Marcano (born 7 February 1993) is a Venezuelan professional footballer who plays as a left winger for Carabobo.

== Club career ==
Machís started his career with AC Mineros de Guayana, making his official debut on 21 August 2011, coming on as a substitute in a 1–1 away draw against Estudiantes de Mérida, for the Venezuelan Primera División championship. He scored his first professional goal ten days later, in a 5–1 home routing over Minasoro FC. Machís appeared regularly for the side, scoring 16 goals during the campaign (eight only in Copa Venezuela), and was awarded a prize from the Venezuelan Football Federation.

On 7 July 2012, Machís joined Udinese, but signed a five-year contract with fellow Giampaolo Pozzo's club Granada CF. He appeared in the pre-season with the latter, scoring three times in only five games.

Machís made his La Liga debut on 20 August 2012, as a late substitute in a 0–1 loss at Rayo Vallecano. He appeared in further three matches for the Andalusians, all from the bench.

On 31 January 2013, Machís moved to Vitória S.C. on loan until June. However, he appeared sparingly with the main squad, appearing with the reserves in the second level. He made two late substitute appearances in the 2012–13 Taça de Portugal semifinal matches, with Vitória eventually winning the Cup.

He returned to Granada in the 2013 summer, being assigned to the B-team in Segunda División B. On 8 May 2014, he joined Hércules CF in a month's loan.

On 6 August 2015, Machís moved to SD Huesca, in a season-long loan deal. Roughly one year later, he joined CD Leganés in the top tier, again in a temporary deal.

On 18 July 2018, Machís signed with Serie A side Udinese. The following 29 January, he returned to Spain and joined Cádiz CF on loan until 30 June.

On 28 July 2019, Machis signed back for the freshly promoted Granada CF after spending half a year on loan at Cádiz CF. He made his competitive debut on 17 August 2019, starting and scoring in a 4–4 draw against Villarreal. On 13 July 2020 he scored against Real Madrid in a 2–1 loss.

On 29 April 2021, Machís scored the equalizer against FC Barcelona. Granada would go on to win 2–1, in their first ever win at Camp Nou.

In January 2023, he joined Real Valladolid on a three-and-a-half-year contract. On 1 July, after the club's relegation, he returned to Cádiz on loan.

== International career ==
Machís debuted with the Venezuela national team on 22 December 2011, starting in a 2–0 loss against Costa Rica. He later appeared with the under-20s in 2013 South American Youth Championship.

== Career statistics ==
=== Club ===
As of match played 5 October 2024

Appearances and goals by club, season and competition
Club	Season	League			National cup		Continental		Total	
Club	Season	Division	Apps	Goals	Apps	Goals	Apps	Goals	Apps	Goals
Mineros de Guayana	2011–12	Venezuelan Primera División	28	8	—		—		28	8
Granada B	2013–14	Segunda División B	27	10	—		—		27	10
Granada B	2014–15	Segunda División B	22	7	—		—		22	7
Granada B	Total		49	17	0	0	0	0	49	17
Granada	2012–13	La Liga	4	0	1	0	—		5	0
Granada	2014–15	La Liga	3	0	1	0	—		4	0
Granada	2017–18	Segunda División	33	14	0	0	—		33	14
Granada	Total		40	14	2	0	0	0	42	14
Vitória Guimarães B (loan)	2012–13	Segunda Liga	8	1	—		—		8	1
Vitória Guimarães (loan)	2012–13	Primeira Liga	3	0	2	0	—		5	0
Hércules (loan)	2013–14	Segunda División	3	0	0	0	—		3	0
Huesca (loan)	2015–16	Segunda División	38	9	2	1	—		40	10
Leganés (loan)	2016–17	La Liga	27	1	2	2	—		29	3
Udinese	2018–19	Serie A	13	0	1	1	—		14	1
Cádiz (loan)	2018–19	Segunda División	15	8	0	0	—		15	8
Granada	2019–20	La Liga	36	7	6	0	—		42	7
Granada	2020–21	La Liga	32	5	2	1	12 (Note: Appearance(s) in UEFA Europa League)	3	46	9
Granada	2021–22	La Liga	25	4	1	0	—		26	4
Granada	Total		93	16	9	1	12	3	114	20
Juárez	2022–23	Liga MX	8	1	—		—		8	1
Valladolid	2022–23	La Liga	11	0	—		—		11	0
Valladolid	2024–25	La Liga	5	0	0	0	—		5	0
Valladolid	Total		16	0	0	0	—		16	0
Cádiz (loan)	2023–24	La Liga	21	4	0	0	—		21	4
Cádiz (loan)	2024–25	Segunda División	0	0	0	0	—		0	0
Cádiz (loan)	Total		21	4	0	0	—		21	4
Career total			362	79	18	5	12	3	392	87

=== International ===
As of match played 15 October 2024

Appearances and goals by national team and year
National team	Year	Apps	Goals
Venezuela	2011	1	0
Venezuela	2012	1	0
Venezuela	2017	6	0
Venezuela	2018	4	2
Venezuela	2019	11	4
Venezuela	2020	4	0
Venezuela	2021	5	2
Venezuela	2022	5	1
Venezuela	2023	6	1
Venezuela	2024	9	1
Total		52	11

Scores and results list Venezuela's goal tally first, score column indicates score after each Machís goal.

List of international goals scored by Darwin Machís
No.	Date	Venue	Opponent	Score	Result	Competition
1	7 September 2018	Hard Rock Stadium, Miami Gardens, United States	Colombia	1–0	1–2	Friendly
2	20 November 2018	Hamad bin Khalifa Stadium, Doha, Qatar	Iran	1–0	1–1	Friendly
3	22 June 2019	Estádio Mineirão, Belo Horizonte, Brazil	Bolivia	1–0	3–1	2019 Copa América
4	22 June 2019	Estádio Mineirão, Belo Horizonte, Brazil	Bolivia	2–0	3–1	2019 Copa América
5	10 October 2019	Estadio Olímpico, Caracas, Venezuela	Bolivia	2–0	4–1	Friendly
6	14 October 2019	Estadio Olímpico, Caracas, Venezuela	Trinidad and Tobago	2–0	2–0	Friendly
7	10 October 2021	Estadio Olímpico, Caracas, Venezuela	Ecuador	1–1	2–1	2022 FIFA World Cup qualification
8	16 November 2021	Estadio Olímpico, Caracas, Venezuela	Peru	1–1	1–2	2022 FIFA World Cup qualification
9	28 January 2022	Estadio Agustín Tovar, Barinas, Venezuela	Bolivia	3–1	4–1	2022 FIFA World Cup qualification
10	17 October 2023	Estadio Monumental, Maturín, Venezuela	Chile	3–0	3–0	2026 FIFA World Cup qualification
11	21 March 2024	Chase Stadium, Fort Lauderdale, United States	Italy	1–1	1–2	Friendly

== Honours ==
Mineros

- Copa Venezuela: 2011

Vitória de Guimarães

- Taça de Portugal: 2012–13

Venezuela

- Kirin Cup: 2019

Individual

- Segunda División Player of the Month: February 2019
