= Alexander Szymanowski =

Argentine footballer (born 1988)

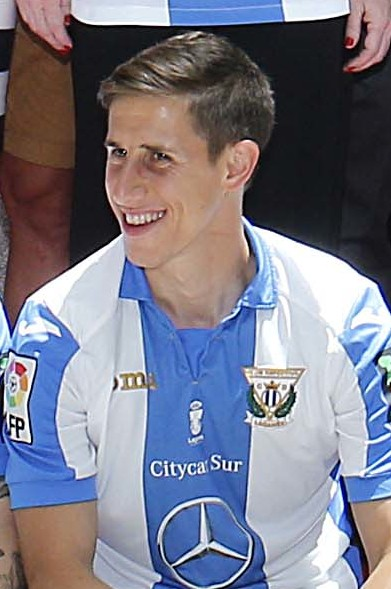
- Szymanowski with Leganés in 2016

Personal information
- Date of birth: 13 October 1988 (age 38)
- Place of birth: Buenos Aires, Argentina
- Height: 1.74 m (5 ft 9 in)
- Position: Winger

Team information
- Current team: Móstoles URJC

Youth career
- 1998–2000: Ferro Carril Oeste
- 2000–2002: Atlético Madrid
- 2002–2004: Unión Adarve
- 2004–2005: Rayo Majadahonda
- 2005–2006: Leones de Castilla
- 2006–2007: Alcobendas

Senior career*
Years	Team	Apps	(Gls)
2007–2009	SS Reyes	24	(0)
2009–2010	Antequera	33	(6)
2010	Jumilla	2	(0)
2010–2011	SS Reyes	26	(1)
2011–2012	Alcalá	38	(11)
2012–2014	Recreativo	40	(10)
2013–2014	→ Brøndby (loan)	11	(4)
2014–2015	Brøndby	40	(2)
2015–2020	Leganés	84	(22)
2020–2021	Recreativo	19	(0)
2021–2022	Gimnástica Segoviana	23	(2)
2022–2023	Vibonese	26	(6)
2023–2024	Talavera	23	(8)
2024–2025	SS Reyes	16	(1)
2025–	Móstoles URJC	0	(0)
- * Club domestic league appearances and goals as of 1 July 2025

Alexander Szymanowski (Polish pronunciation: [alɛˈksandɛr ʂzɨmanˈɔfskʲi]; born 13 October 1988) is an Argentine professional footballer who plays as a left winger for Spanish Tercera Federación club Móstoles URJC.

Raised in Spain, he spent most of his career there, totalling 42 games and 10 goals for Leganés in La Liga, and 82 appearances and 22 goals in Segunda División for that club and Recreativo. He also had a spell in Denmark with Brøndby, and suffered two-and-a-half seasons of injuries later in his career.

== Club career ==
=== Early career ===
Born in Buenos Aires, Szymanowski moved to Guadarrama, Madrid in November 2000, at the age of 12. After four months on trial at Real Madrid, he subsequently represented Atlético Madrid, AD Unión Adarve, CF Rayo Majadahonda, CA Leones de Castilla and Alcobendas CF as a youth.

Szymanowski made his senior debuts with UD San Sebastián de los Reyes in the 2007–08 campaign, suffering relegation from Segunda División B. In the 2009 summer he moved to Tercera División side Antequera CF, appearing regularly and subsequently returning to his previous club in the following year.

In July 2011 Szymanowski moved to RSD Alcalá in the third tier. He finished the season with 38 appearances and 11 goals, being the club's top goalscorer.

=== Recreativo ===
On 11 July 2012, Szymanowski signed a three-year contract with Recreativo de Huelva in Segunda División. After being nearly left out of the squad due to not having an EU passport, he played his first match as a professional on 25 August, starting in a 1–0 home win against CD Mirandés.

On 14 October Szymanowski scored his first professional goal, netting the last in a 2–5 away loss against Girona FC. On 26 May 2013, he scored a brace in a 2–1 home win against Córdoba CF, and contributed with 38 appearances and 10 goals during his first campaign, with his side narrowly avoiding relegation.

=== Brøndby ===
On 29 August 2013, Szymanowski signed a one-year loan contract with Danish Superliga club Brøndby IF with a €2 million buyout clause. On 15 September he made his debut, in a 2–1 home win over Odense Boldklub. Late in the month, Szymanowski scored his first two goals abroad, in a 3–2 win over FC Copenhagen, being also named man of the match.

On 10 January 2014, Brøndby activated the buyout clause in Szymanowski's contract, who signed a two-and-a-half-year contract with the Danish side. On 27 July of the following year he was released.

=== Leganés ===
In July 2015, Szymanowski signed a two-year deal with CD Leganés in the second tier. He was an undisputed starter for the Madrid side during the season, scoring a career-best 12 goals to help his side promote to La Liga for the first time ever.

Szymanowski made his debut in the main category of Spanish football on 27 August 2016, starting in a 0–0 home draw against Atlético Madrid. He scored his first goal in the division on 25 September, but in a 1–2 home loss against Valencia CF.

On 20 July 2020, Szymanowski left Leganés after struggling severely with injuries during his last two seasons at the club.

=== Later career ===
On 5 October 2020, transfer deadline day, Szymanowski returned to Recreativo, now in the third tier. He was one of two players sent off in a 3–1 loss at Algeciras CF the following 24 January, and the season ended with an unprecedented double relegation to the fifth tier following a restructuring of the Spanish football league system.

Szymanowski joined Gimnástica Segoviana CF of the new Segunda División RFEF on 6 August 2021.

In September 2022, Szymanowski joined Italian Serie D club Vibonese. After one season, he returned to Spain to sign with Segunda Federación club Talavera.

== Personal life ==
Born in Argentina, Szymanowski is Polish, Belarusian, Spanish and Italian descent. His paternal grandfather was a Pole born in 1923 in what was then Poland, but has since been transferred to Ukraine, who moved at the age of five to Argentina and married a Belarusian woman. Szymanowski's maternal grandfather's parents were Spanish (from Toro, Province of Zamora) and his maternal grandmother's parents were Italian. He also holds Spanish citizenship, his full name in that document being Alexander Szymanowski Alonso (Note: In this Spanish name, the first or paternal surname is Szymanowski and the second or maternal family name is Alonso.).

Szymanowski's sister, Marianela, is also a footballer who has played in the Primera División and for Argentina's women's team. After he scored his first double in Primera in an important 4–0 win over Betis in May 2017, they embraced each other in Butarque's stands.

== Career statistics ==
As of match played 22 October 2023

Appearances and goals by club, season and competition
Club	Season	League			National cup (Note: Includes Copa del Rey, Danish Cup, Coppa Italia Serie D, Copa Federación)		Europe		Other		Total	
Club	Season	Division	Apps	Goals	Apps	Goals	Apps	Goals	Apps	Goals	Apps	Goals
SS Reyes	2007–08	Segunda División B	9	0	0	0	—		—		9	0
SS Reyes	2008–09	Tercera División	15	0	0	0	—		—		15	0
SS Reyes	Total		24	0	0	0	—		—		24	0
Antequera	2009–10	Tercera División	33	6	0	0	—		—		33	6
Jumilla	2009–10	Tercera División	2	0	0	0	—		4 (Note: Appearances in 2010 Tercera División play-offs)	0	6	0
SS Reyes	2010–11	Tercera División	26	1	0	0	—		6 (Note: Appearances in 2011 Tercera División play-offs)	0	32	1
Alcalá	2011–12	Segunda División B	38	11	1	0	—		—		39	11
Recreativo	2012–13	Segunda División	38	10	1	0	—		—		39	10
Recreativo	2013–14	Segunda División	2	0	0	0	—		—		2	0
Recreativo	Total		40	10	1	0	—		—		41	10
Brøndby	2013–14	Danish Superliga	26	5	3	1	—		—		29	6
Brøndby	2014–15	Danish Superliga	24	1	1	0	1 (Note: Appearance in UEFA Europa League)	0	—		26	1
Brøndby	2015–16	Danish Superliga	1	0	0	0	2	0	—		3	0
Brøndby	Total		51	6	4	1	3	0	—		58	7
Leganés	2015–16	Segunda División	42	12	4	1	—		—		46	13
Leganés	2016–17	La Liga	28	8	0	0	—		—		28	8
Leganés	2017–18	La Liga	13	2	2	0	—		—		15	2
Leganés	2018–19	La Liga	1	0	0	0	—		—		1	0
Leganés	2019–20	La Liga	0	0	0	0	—		—		0	0
Leganés	Total		84	22	6	1	—		—		90	23
Recreativo	2020–21	Segunda División B	19	0	0	0	—		—		19	0
Gimnástica Segoviana	2021–22	Segunda División RFEF	23	2	1	0	—		1 (Note: Appearance in 2022 Segunda División RFEF relegation play-off)	1	25	3
Vibonese	2022–23	Serie D	26	6	1	0	—		—		27	6
Talavera	2023–24	Segunda Federación	8	4	2	0	—		—		10	4
Career total			374	68	16	2	3	0	11	1	404	71

== Honours ==
Individual

- Segunda División Player of the Month: January 2016
