= Jon Ander Serantes =

Spanish footballer (born 1989)

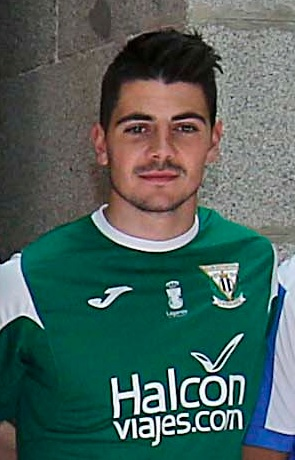
- Serantes with Leganés in 2016

Personal information
- Full name: Jon Ander Serantes Simón
- Date of birth: 24 October 1989 (age 37)
- Place of birth: Barakaldo, Spain
- Height: 1.84 m (6 ft 0 in)
- Position: Goalkeeper

Youth career
- 1998–1999: Santutxu
- 1999–2003: Athletic Bilbao
- 2003–2008: Barakaldo

Senior career*
Years	Team	Apps	(Gls)
2008–2011	Barakaldo	27	(0)
2008–2009	→ Deusto (loan)	31	(0)
2011–2014	Bilbao Athletic	44	(0)
2013–2014	→ Barakaldo (loan)	38	(0)
2014–2015	Lugo	0	(0)
2014–2015	→ Leganés (loan)	25	(0)
2015–2018	Leganés	56	(0)
2019–2021	Avispa Fukuoka	67	(0)
2021	Tenerife	3	(0)
2021–2022	Logroñés	30	(0)
2023–2024	Imabari	49	(0)
2025–2026	Gifu	34	(0)

International career
2018	Basque Country	1	(0)
- * Club domestic league appearances and goals as of 22:35, 3 September 2026 (UTC)

Jon Ander Serantes Simón (born 24 October 1989) is a Spanish professional footballer who plays as a goalkeeper.

== Club career ==
=== Barakaldo and Athletic ===
Born in Barakaldo, Biscay, Basque Country, Serantes graduated from Barakaldo CF's youth system after spells at Santutxu FC and Athletic Bilbao. He made his debut as a senior in 2008, while on loan at amateurs SD Deusto.

Serantes subsequently returned to Barakaldo in June 2009, and spent the following two seasons as a backup to Igor Etxebarrieta. On 19 January 2011, he signed a two-year contract with his former club Athletic to be made effective in July, being assigned to the reserves.

On 24 July 2013, Serantes returned to his hometown club in a season-long loan deal. He appeared in all Segunda División B matches during his tenure, and was subsequently released by Athletic on 26 May 2014.

=== Lugo ===
On 9 July 2014, Serrantes signed for Segunda División's CD Lugo. On 1 September, he was loaned to another second-tier team, CD Leganés, for a year.

Serantes played his first match as a professional on 23 November 2014, starting in a 1–0 away loss against CD Mirandés.

=== Leganés ===
Serantes terminated his contract with the Galicians on 2 July 2015, and joined Leganés on a two-year deal a day later. He featured in all 42 games in the first season in his second spell, helping the club to reach La Liga for the first time in its 87-year history and finishing second in the Ricardo Zamora Trophy in the process.

Serantes made his debut in the Spanish top flight on 22 August 2016, keeping a clean sheet in a 1–0 away win over RC Celta de Vigo. On 8 September, he was named the La Liga Player of the Month. Shortly after, during the first half of a league match at RCD Espanyol, he suffered a serious knee injury, and was sidelined for the rest of the campaign.

=== Later career ===
On 30 December 2018, Serantes moved abroad for the first time in his career, signing for Japan's Avispa Fukuoka after terminating his contract with Leganés. He returned to Spain and its second division on 1 February 2021, on a six-month deal at CD Tenerife.

On 7 August 2021, Serantes joined Primera División RFEF side UD Logroñés on a two-year contract. He went back to Japan in December 2022, with J3 League club FC Imabari.

Serantes moved to fellow third-tier FC Gifu in January 2025.

== International career ==
Uncapped by Spain at any level, Serantes made his debut for the unofficial Basque Country team on 12 October 2018, in a 4–2 win over Venezuela at the Mendizorrotza Stadium. He played the second half in place of Asier Riesgo.
