= Charlie I'Anson =

English footballer

Personal information
- Full name: Charlie Dean I'Anson
- Date of birth: 1 July 1993 (age 33)
- Place of birth: Luton, England
- Position: Centre back

Youth career
- Atlético Benamiel
- 2009–2010: Grimsby Town

Senior career*
Years	Team	Apps	(Gls)
2010–2012	Grimsby Town	17	(2)
2012–2014	Elche B	56	(4)
2013–2015	Elche	2	(0)
2014–2015	→ Alcorcón (loan)	8	(0)
2015	→ Oviedo (loan)	12	(0)
2015–2017	Valencia B	37	(1)
2017–2018	Granada	4	(0)
2018–2019	Murcia	45	(1)
2019–2020	Rayo Majadahonda	25	(1)
2020–2022	UCAM Murcia	49	(3)
2022–2023	SS Reyes	23	(0)
2023–2024	Vélez	12	(0)
2024	Juventud Torremolinos	14	(1)
- * Club domestic league appearances and goals as of 12 May 2024

Charlie Dean I'Anson (born 1 July 1993), known in Spain as simply Charlie, is an English professional footballer who plays as a centre-back.

He started his career at Grimsby Town, with whom he spent two years in the Conference. In 2012, he moved to Elche, whom he represented in La Liga. I'Anson has since remained in Spanish football and has played for Alcorcón, Real Oviedo, Valencia B, Granada, Real Murcia, Rayo Majadahonda and UCAM Murcia. In 2012 he was called up to the England C team but the game was postponed and he remained uncapped.

== Early life ==
I'Anson was born in Luton, Bedfordshire, to parents Kay and Dean, and is a Tottenham Hotspur supporter. Along with his older brother Alfie, he moved to Málaga, Spain, with his parents at the age of 7, and within a year, was fluent in Spanish.

While living there, I'Anson was a teammate of Isco at Atlético Benamiel. At the age of 15, he was scouted by Nottingham Forest, and was offered a contract as a back-up, but did not want to be a reserve at a young age while living in a different country to his parents, so signed with Grimsby Town instead.

== Club career ==
=== Grimsby Town ===
As a 17-year-old, he capped a first-team debut with a goal in a 2–0 win in the Conference against Mansfield Town on 19 April 2011.

I'Anson was offered his first professional one-year contract in May 2011, after impressing in the club's youth team and final four first-team games of the 2010–11 season. He was released and left the club on 3 May 2012 after he turned down a fresh contract. He played 17 times in the league, scoring twice.

=== Elche ===
In July 2012, I'Anson joined Spanish side Elche CF of the Segunda División on trial, later signing with the club. He spent his first senior season in Spain with the reserves in Tercera División, appearing 25 times and scoring once, being promoted to Segunda División B.

On 19 August 2013, I'Anson was included in a first-team squad for the first time, remaining an unused substitute as Elche began the La Liga season with a 3–0 loss at Rayo Vallecano. He made his debut on 5 October, starting in a 2–1 home win over Espanyol. I'Anson was sent off on 2 February 2014, as the reserves lost 1–0 at Lleida Esportiu.

On 29 June 2014, I'Anson joined Real Murcia on a season-long loan; however, after the club's relegation to the third level he moved to second-tier AD Alcorcón also in a temporary deal. On 27 January 2015, after appearing sparingly for the Madrid side, he joined Real Oviedo on loan until the end of the season, helping them win the third division.

=== Valencia B ===
On 20 August 2015, I'Anson rescinded his contract with Elche. The following day, he joined Valencia CF Mestalla, again in the third tier. He made his debut for them on 20 September, replacing Nacho Gil for the final 17 minutes of a 3–2 loss at UE Cornellà. His first goal for them came on 30 April, opening a 2–0 home win over CF Badalona. On 10 September 2016, he was sent off in a 2–2 draw at Atlético Saguntino.

=== Granada ===
On 7 July 2017, Charlie signed a one-year deal with Granada CF, newly relegated to the second tier. He made his debut on 27 August, replacing Germán for the final five minutes of a 1–1 draw at Real Zaragoza.

=== Murcia and Rayo Majadahonda ===
On 30 January 2018, I'Anson returned to Murcia, after rescinding his contract with Granada. On 26 July of the following year, he moved to fellow third division side CF Rayo Majadahonda.

On 5 August 2020, I'Anson joined Segunda División B side UCAM Murcia.

I'Anson signed for Vélez ahead of the 2023–24 season under fellow Englishman Michael Jolley.

On 1 February 2024, I'Anson signed for Tercera Federación side Juventud Torremolinos.

== International career ==
In August 2011 I'Anson and Grimsby teammate Shaun Pearson were called up to the England C team to face the India Under-23 team, however the game never went ahead.

== Honours ==
Grimsby Town

- Lincolnshire Senior Cup: 2011–12

Oviedo

- Segunda División B: 2014–15
