= Alberto Martín (footballer) =

Spanish footballer

Martín
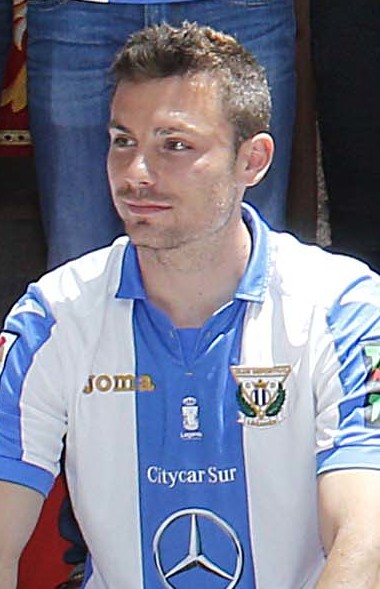
- Martín with Leganés in 2016

Personal information
- Full name: Alberto Martín-Romo García-Adámez
- Date of birth: 31 March 1989 (age 37)
- Place of birth: Don Benito, Spain
- Height: 1.81 m (5 ft 11 1/2 in)
- Position: Midfielder

Team information
- Current team: Linense
- Number: 6

Youth career
- Don Benito

Senior career*
Years	Team	Apps	(Gls)
2008–2009	Don Benito	31	(2)
2009–2013	Almería B	116	(2)
2012	Almería	1	(0)
2013–2017	Leganés	103	(1)
2017–2019	Granada	44	(0)
2020–2021	Recreativo	9	(0)
2021–2022	Arosa	27	(3)
2022–2024	Melilla	38	(1)
2024	Real Avilés	13	(0)
2024–	Linense	7	(0)
- * Club domestic league appearances and goals as of 13 October 2024

Alberto Martín-Romo García-Adámez (born 31 March 1989), known simply as Alberto Martín, is a Spanish footballer who plays for Linense as a midfielder.

== Club career ==
Martín was born in Don Benito, Province of Badajoz. He started playing as a senior in the 2008–09 season with CD Don Benito, in Tercera División. He signed for UD Almería one year later, being initially assigned to the B team also in the fourth division.

On 28 April 2012, Martín was first called up by the main squad, being selected for a Segunda División game against Deportivo de La Coruña. He made his competitive debut the following day, coming on as an 84th-minute substitute for Dani Bautista in an eventual 2–0 home win.

On 16 July 2013, Martín joined Segunda División B club CD Leganés. He appeared in 30 matches during the campaign (six in the play-offs), achieving promotion.

Martín scored his first professional goal on 24 August 2014, opening the 1–1 home draw against Deportivo Alavés. In 2015–16, he contributed 28 appearances as the side were promoted to La Liga for the first time ever.

Martín made his debut in the Spanish top flight on 22 August 2016, starting in a 1–0 away victory over RC Celta de Vigo. On 7 July of the following year, he signed a two-year deal with Granada CF.

On 19 January 2024, following a 1,5-year spell at UD Melilla, Martín joined Segunda Federación side Real Avilés CF
