= 1989–90 Sporting de Gijón season =

Real Sporting
1989–90 season
- Chairman: Plácido Rodríguez
- Manager: Carlos García Cuervo
- Stadium: El Molinón
- La Liga: 13th
- Copa del Rey: Quarterfinals
- Top goalscorer: Narciso (11)

The 1989–90 Sporting de Gijón season was the 29th season of the club in La Liga, the 15th consecutive after its last promotion.

== Overview ==
Coach Jesús Aranguren was sacked after earning only one point in the first six matches. Carlos García Cuervo replaced him and helped the team to avoid the relegation playoffs three weeks before the end of the season.

== Squad ==
Note: Flags indicate national team as defined under FIFA eligibility rules; some limited exceptions apply. Players may hold more than one non-FIFA nationality.

No.	Pos.	Nation	Player
—	GK	ESP	Ablanedo II
—	GK	ESP	Pedro Rodríguez
—	GK	ESP	Isidro Fernández
—	DF	ESP	Ángel Alcázar
—	DF	ESP	Arturo
—	DF	ESP	Manolo Jiménez
—	DF	ESP	Abelardo
—	DF	ESP	Luis Sierra
—	DF	ESP	Tati
—	DF	ESP	Ablanedo I
—	DF	ESP	Cundi
—	DF	YUG	Vladimir Vermezović
—	DF	IRL	Kevin Moran
—	DF	ESP	José Díez Calleja

No.	Pos.	Nation	Player
—	MF	ESP	Iñaki Eraña
—	MF	ESP	Juanma
—	MF	ESP	Óscar
—	MF	ESP	Jaime
—	MF	ESP	Joaquín
—	MF	ESP	Emilio
—	MF	ESP	Torres
—	MF	TCH	Milan Luhový
—	MF	ESP	Juan Carlos
—	MF	ESP	Ballesteros
—	FW	ESP	Javier Manjarín
—	FW	ESP	Joaquín Villa
—	FW	ESP	Narciso
—	FW	ESP	Luis Enrique

== Competitions ==
=== La Liga ===
==== Results by round ====
Round	1	2	3	4	5	6	7	8	9	10	11	12	13	14	15	16	17	18	19	20	21	22	23	24	25	26	27	28	29	30	31	32	33	34	35	36	37	38
Ground	A	H	A	H	A	H	A	H	A	H	A	H	A	H	A	H	A	H	A	H	A	H	A	H	A	H	A	H	A	H	A	H	A	H	A	H	A	H
Result	L	D	L	L	L	L	L	W	W	D	L	W	L	W	W	W	D	W	L	D	L	W	L	L	L	D	W	D	L	D	D	L	W	D	D	W	L	W
Position	18	19	19	20	20	20	20	20	18	18	19	17	18	18	15	13	13	11	12	12	13	12	13	14	15	14	14	13	14	14	14	14	13	13	13	13	13	13

Source: BDFutbol
A = Away; H = Home; W = Win; D = Draw; L = Loss

==== League table ====
Pos	Team	Pld	W	D	L	GF	GA	GD	Pts
11	Oviedo	38	12	15	11	41	46	−5	39
12	Athletic Bilbao	38	11	15	12	37	39	−2	37
13	Sporting Gijón	38	12	10	16	37	34	+3	34
14	Castellón	38	9	14	15	30	48	−18	32
15	Cádiz	38	12	6	20	28	63	−35	30

Source: BDFútbol
Rules for classification: 1) Points; 2) Head-to-head results; 3) Goal difference; 4) Number of goals scored

==== Matches ====
3 September 1989 1	Real Madrid	2–0	Real Sporting	Madrid
	Míchel 5'; Hugo Sánchez 26'	Summary		Stadium: Santiago Bernabéu; Referee: Alfonso Álvarez

10 September 1989 2	Real Sporting	1–1	Valencia	Gijón
	Joaquín Villa 12'	Summary	Eloy 80'	Stadium: El Molinón; Referee: Sánchez Moreno

17 September 1989 3	Cádiz	2–0	Real Sporting	Cádiz
	Mágico González 33'; Cortijo 45'	Summary	Luis Enrique (red card) 71'	Stadium: Ramón de Carranza; Referee: Riera Morro

24 September 1989 4	Real Sporting	0–1	Málaga	Gijón
		Summary	Paquito 35'	Stadium: El Molinón; Referee: Pérez Sánchez

1 October 1989 5	Sevilla	1–0	Real Sporting	Seville
	Conte 43'	Summary		Stadium: Ramón Sánchez Pizjuán; Referee: Taboada Soto

8 October 1989 6	Real Sporting	0–1	Athletic Bilbao	Gijón
		Report	Txirri 33'	Stadium: El Molinón; Referee: Merino González

14 October 1989 7	Zaragoza	2–1	Real Sporting	Zaragoza
	Sirakov 52'; Juanito 55'	Summary	Joaquín Villa 85'	Stadium: La Romareda; Referee: Calvo Córdova

22 October 1989 8	Real Sporting	3–0	Valladolid	Gijón
	Emilio 36'; Joaquín Villa 64'; Narciso 72'	Summary		Stadium: El Molinón; Referee: Vico Díaz

29 October 1989 9	Osasuna	0–1	Real Sporting	Pamplona
		Report	Manjarín 89'	Stadium: El Sadar; Referee: Ansuategui Roca

5 November 1989 10	Real Sporting	0–0	Oviedo	Gijón
		Report		Stadium: El Molinón; Referee: Soriano Aladrén

12 November 1989 11	Castellón	1–0	Real Sporting	Castelló de la Plana
	Ayúcar 58'	Report		Stadium: Castalia; Referee: Sánchez Moreno

19 November 1989 12	Real Sporting	3–0	Mallorca	Gijón
	Narciso 64'; Emilio 83'; Joaquín Villa 85'	Summary		Stadium: El Molinón; Referee: Albert Giménez

26 November 1989 13	Barcelona	2–0	Real Sporting	Barcelona
	Bakero 54'; Roberto 77'	Report		Stadium: Nou Camp; Referee: Díaz Agüero

3 December 1989 14	Real Sporting	1–0	Rayo Vallecano	Gijón
	Joaquín 62'; Manjarín (red card) 88'	Report	Berg (red card) 73'; Sánchez Candil (red card) 88'	Stadium: El Molinón; Referee: Calvo Córdova

10 December 1989 15	Real Sociedad	1–2	Real Sporting	San Sebastián
	Górriz 23'	Summary	Emilio 10'; Narciso 39'	Stadium: Atotxa; Referee: Peraíta Ibáñez

17 December 1989 16	Real Sporting	1–0	Tenerife	Gijón
	Emilio 67'	Summary		Stadium: El Molinón; Referee: Rubio Valdivieso

30 December 1989 17	Celta	0–0	Real Sporting	Vigo
		Summary		Stadium: Balaídos; Referee: Soriano Aladrén

7 January 1990 18	Real Sporting	5–1	Logroñés	Gijón
	Narciso 3', 52'; Abelardo 14'; Emilio 63' (pen.); Joaquín Villa 84'	Report	Setién 1' (pen.)	Stadium: El Molinón; Referee: Socorro González

14 January 1990 19	Atlético Madrid	3–1	Real Sporting	Madrid
	Baltazar 40', 85' (pen.); Marina 44'	Report	Emilio 15'	Stadium: Vicente Calderón; Referee: Urío Velázquez

20 January 1990 20	Real Sporting	1–1	Real Madrid	Gijón
	Abelardo 35'	Summary	Hugo Sánchez 85'	Stadium: El Molinón; Referee: Mazorra Freire

28 January 1990 21	Valencia	2–0	Real Sporting	Valencia
	Arroyo 46'; Penev 63'	Summary		Stadium: Luis Casanova; Referee: Marín López

31 January 1990 22	Real Sporting	4–0	Cádiz	Gijón
	Narciso 8', 43'; Emilio 47' (pen.); Ablanedo I 74'	Summary		Stadium: El Molinón; Referee: Hernández Velázquez

4 February 1990 23	Málaga	1–0	Real Sporting	Málaga
	Mata 86'	Summary		Stadium: La Rosaleda; Referee: Albert Giménez

11 February 1990 24	Sporting de Gijón	0–1	Sevilla	Gijón
		Summary	Rafa Paz 71'	Stadium: El Molinón; Referee: Taboada Soto

14 February 1990 25	Athletic Bilbao	1–0	Real Sporting	Bilbao
	Mendiguren 24'	Summary		Stadium: San Mamés; Referee: Martín Navarrete

18 February 1990 26	Real Sporting	1–1	Zaragoza	Gijón
	Manjarín 39'	Summary	Pablo Alfaro 75'	Stadium: El Molinón; Referee: Díaz Agüero

25 February 1990 27	Valladolid	1–3	Real Sporting	Valladolid
	Janković 83'	Summary	Narciso 29'; Alcázar 59'; Emilio 61' (pen.)	Stadium: José Zorrilla; Referee: Peraíta Ibáñez

24 March 1990 28	Real Sporting	0–0	Osasuna	Gijón
		Summary		Stadium: El Molinón; Referee: López Nieto

11 March 1990 29	Oviedo	1–0	Real Sporting	Oviedo
	Hicks 51'	Summary		Stadium: Carlos Tartiere; Referee: Soriano Aladrén

18 March 1990 30	Real Sporting	0–0	Castellón	Gijón
		Summary		Stadium: El Molinón; Referee: Sánchez Moreno

25 March 1990 31	Mallorca	1–1	Real Sporting	Palma
	Nadal 11'	Summary	Jiménez 69'	Stadium: Lluís Sitjar; Referee: García de Loza

31 March 1990 32	Real Sporting	0–2	Barcelona	Gijón
		Summary	Valverde 47', 82'	Stadium: El Molinón; Referee: Valdés Sánchez

8 April 1990 33	Rayo Vallecano	1–2	Real Sporting	Madrid
	Hugo Maradona 38'; Ibarrondo (red card) 79'	Summary	Manjarín 9'; Emilio 73' (pen.)	Stadium: Vallecas; Referee: Benavente Garasa

15 April 1990 34	Real Sporting	0–0	Real Sociedad	Gijón
		Summary		Stadium: El Molinón; Referee: Ramos Marcos

22 April 1990 35	Tenerife	1–1	Real Sporting	Santa Cruz de Tenerife
	Guina 65'	Summary	Narciso 75' (pen.)	Stadium: Heliodoro Rodríguez López; Referee: Ansuategui Roca

25 April 1990 36	Real Sporting	3–0	Celta	Gijón
	Narciso 6'; Manjarín 47'; Jiménez 88'	Summary		Stadium: El Molinón; Referee: Urío Velázquez

29 April 1990 37	Logroñés	1–0	Real Sporting	Logroño
	Setién 77'	Summary		Stadium: Las Gaunas; Referee: Jiménez Muñoz

6 May 1990 38	Real Sporting	2–1	Atlético Madrid	Gijón
	Narciso 34' (pen.); Óscar 64'	Summary	Tomás (red card) 75'; Alcázar 79' (o.g.)	Stadium: El Molinón; Referee: Benavente Garasa

=== Copa del Rey ===
==== Matches ====
6 September 1989 First round First leg	Figueres	1–4	Real Sporting	Figueres
	Alejo 84'	Report	Torres 8'; Juanma 47'; Villa 57'; Emilio 59' (pen.)	Stadium: Vilatenim; Referee: Ansuategui Roca

21 September 1989 Fourth round Second leg	Real Sporting	0–2 (3–4 agg.)	Figueres	Gijón
		Report	Mauri 36'; Bayly 85'	Stadium: El Molinón; Referee: Riera Morro

4 October 1989 Second round First leg	Elche	0–0	Real Sporting	Elche
		Report		Stadium: Manuel Martínez Valero; Referee: López Nieto

25 October 1989 Second round Second leg	Real Sporting	0–0 (a.e.t.) (0–0 agg.) (3–1 p)	Elche	Gijón
		Report		Stadium: El Molinón; Referee: Benavente Garasa

8 November 1989 Round of 16; First leg	Tenerife	0–0	Real Sporting	Santa Cruz de Tenerife
		Report		Stadium: Heliodoro Rodríguez López; Referee: Sánchez Molina Soto

29 November 1989 Round of 16; Second leg	Real Sporting	3–0 (3–0 agg.)	Tenerife	Gijón
	Alcázar 61'; Villa 79'; Narciso 84'	Report		Stadium: El Molinón; Referee: Urízar Azpitarte

10 January 1989 Quarterfinals; First leg	Real Sporting	0–0	Cádiz	Gijón
		Report		Stadium: El Molinón; Referee: Vico Díaz

25 January 1990 Quarterfinals; Second leg	Cádiz	2–1 (a.e.t.) (2–1 agg.)	Real Sporting	Cádiz
	Mágico González 18'; Marcelo 95'	Report	Manjarín 10'	Stadium: Ramón de Carranza; Referee: Jiménez Muñoz

== Squad statistics ==
=== Appearances and goals ===
No.	Pos	Nat	Player	Total		La Liga		Copa del Rey	
No.	Pos	Nat	Player	Apps	Goals	Apps	Goals	Apps	Goals
	GK	(Spain) ESP	Ablanedo II	36	0	31+0	0	5+0	0
	GK	(Spain) ESP	Pedro Rodríguez	3	0	0+0	0	3+0	0
	GK	(Spain) ESP	Isidro Fernández	8	0	7+1	0	0+0	0
	DF	(Spain) ESP	Ángel Alcázar	42	2	34+2	1	4+2	1
	DF	(Spain) ESP	Arturo	1	0	1+0	0	0+0	0
	DF	(Spain) ESP	Manolo Jiménez	45	2	37+0	2	8+0	0
	DF	(Spain) ESP	Abelardo	38	2	33+0	2	5+0	0
	DF	(Spain) ESP	Luis Sierra	29	0	20+2	0	6+1	0
	DF	(Spain) ESP	Tati	36	0	30+0	0	6+0	0
	DF	(Spain) ESP	Ablanedo I	28	1	21+2	1	5+0	0
	DF	(Spain) ESP	Cundi	1	0	0+0	0	1+0	0
	DF	(Socialist Federal Republic of Yugoslavia) YUG	Vladimir Vermezović	22	0	19+1	0	2+0	0
	DF	(Republic of Ireland) IRL	Kevin Moran	9	0	5+1	0	3+0	0
	DF	(Spain) ESP	José Díez Calleja	5	0	3+0	0	2+0	0
	MF	(Spain) ESP	Iñaki Eraña	26	0	7+14	0	1+4	0
	MF	(Spain) ESP	Juanma	23	1	11+8	0	4+0	1
	MF	(Spain) ESP	Óscar	18	1	9+5	1	2+2	0
	MF	(Spain) ESP	Jaime	15	0	9+5	0	1+0	0
	MF	(Spain) ESP	Joaquín	38	1	32+0	1	6+0	0
	MF	(Spain) ESP	Emilio	41	10	32+1	9	8+0	1
	MF	(Spain) ESP	Torres	11	1	2+6	0	2+1	1
	MF	(Czechoslovakia) TCH	Milan Luhový	5	0	5+0	0	0+0	0
	MF	(Spain) ESP	Juan Carlos	5	0	3+1	0	0+1	0
	MF	(Spain) ESP	José Luis Ballesteros	0	0	0+0	0	0+0	0
	FW	(Spain) ESP	Javier Manjarín	33	5	13+16	4	1+3	1
	FW	(Spain) ESP	Joaquín Villa	37	7	25+4	5	7+1	2
	FW	(Spain) ESP	Narciso	41	12	29+5	11	6+1	1
	FW	(Spain) ESP	Luis Enrique	1	0	0+1	0	0+0	0
