= List of Sporting de Gijón seasons =

This is a list of seasons played by Sporting de Gijón in Spanish and European football, from 1916 to the most recent completed season. It details the club's achievements in major competitions, and the top scorers in league games for each season.

The club was runner-up of the Liga one time, of the Spanish Cup two times and played the UEFA Cup six times.

== Key ==
Key to league record:

- Pos = Final position
- Pld = Matches played
- W = Matches won
- D = Matches drawn
- L = Matches lost
- GF = Goals for
- GA = Goals against
- Pts = Points

Key to playoffs record:

- PP = Promotion playoffs
- RP = Relegation playoffs
- → = Remained in the same category
- ↑ = Promoted
- ↓ = Relegated

Key to rounds:

- W = Winner
- RU = Runner-up
- SF = Semi-finals
- QF = Quarter-finals
- R16 = Round of 16
- R32 = Round of 32
- R64 = Round of 64
- 6R = Sixth round
- 5R = Fifth round
- 4R = Fourth round
- 3R = Third round
- 2R = Second round
- 1R = First round
- GS = Group stage

Champions	Runners-up	Promoted	Relegated	Pichichi

== Seasons ==
Season	League									Cup	Europe		Other competitions		Top scorer(s)	
Season	Div	Pos	Pld	W	D	L	GF	GA	Pts	Cup	Europe		Other competitions		Player(s)	Goal
1916–17	No national league available									QF			Regional Championship	W		
1917–18	No national league available									QF			Regional Championship	W		
1918–19	No national league available									QF			Regional Championship	W		
1919–20	No national league available									QF			Regional Championship	W		
1920–21	No national league available									QF			Regional Championship	W		
1921–22	No national league available									SF			Regional Championship	W		
1922–23	No national league available									SF			Regional Championship	W		
1923–24	No national league available									QF			Regional Championship	W		
1924–25	No national league available												Regional Championship	2nd		
1925–26	No national league available									1R			Regional Championship	W		
1926–27	No national league available									QF			Regional Championship	W		
1927–28	No national league available															
1929	2ª	4th	18	7	5	6	41	35	19	R32			Regional Championship	2nd	(Spain) Guillermo Campanal	12
1929–30	2ª	2nd	18	9	3	6	21	28	21	R32			Regional Championship	W	(Spain) Pin	8
1930–31	2ª	4th	18	8	2	8	50	31	18	R16			Regional Championship	W	(Spain) Adolfo Morán	18
1931–32	2ª	3rd	16	7	4	5	29	25	18	QF			Regional Championship	2nd	(Spain) Ramón Herrera	11
1932–33	2ª	6th	18	8	2	8	49	40	18	R16			Regional Championship	2nd	(Spain) Ramón Herrera	29
1933–34	2ª	6th	18	8	2	8	30	38	18	R16			Regional Championship	2nd	(Spain) Ramón Herrera	11
1934–35	2ª	3rd	14	7	2	5	23	21	16	R16			Regional Championship	2nd	(Spain) Pin	6
1935–36	2ª	3rd	14	6	4	4	32	26	16	3R			Regional Championship	3rd	(Spain) Patricio Rubiera	7
1936–39	Spanish Civil War															
1939–40	2ª	3rd	14	7	3	4	28	17	17	R16			Regional Championship	W	(Spain) Rubio	14
1940–41	2ª	3rd	22	13	3	6	50	38	29	3R					(Spain) Pipi	13
1941–42	2ª	1st	14	8	4	2	38	23	20	R32					(Spain) Mijares	18
1941–42	2ª	PP	10	3	2	5	25	19	→	R32					(Spain) Mijares	18
1942–43	2ª	1st	14	9	1	4	34	23	19	R32					(Spain) Chipía (Spain) Mijares	11
1942–43	2ª	PP	11	4	2	5	18	25	→	R32					(Spain) Chipía (Spain) Mijares	11
1943–44	2ª	1st	26	16	5	5	50	19	37	R32					(Spain) Gundemaro	12
1944–45	1ª	7th	26	9	6	11	42	46	24	R16					(Spain) Pío	11
1945–46	1ª	9th	26	9	7	10	37	39	25	R16					(Spain) Pío	10
1946–47	1ª	10th	26	10	5	11	51	59	25	1R					(Spain) Francisco Méndez	18
1947–48	1ª	14th	26	7	4	15	37	69	18	6R					(Spain) Pío	12
1948–49	2ª	6th	26	12	5	9	56	44	29	5R					(Spain) Paco Campos	20
1949–50	2ª	3rd	30	17	5	8	89	46	39	2R					(Spain) Pío	32
1950–51	2ª	1st	32	23	2	7	100	32	48	QF					(Spain) Paco Campos	29
1951–52	1ª	13th	30	10	5	15	49	75	25						(Spain) José Prendes	10
1952–53	1ª	7th	30	11	8	11	39	54	30	R16					(Spain) Rafael Grau	13
1953–54	1ª	16th	30	7	2	21	44	81	16						(Spain) Pepe Ortiz	11
1954–55	2ª	4th	30	15	8	7	50	34	38						(Spain) José Prendes	12
1955–56	2ª	7th	30	14	4	12	51	46	32						(Spain) Pepe Ortiz	15
1956–57	2ª	1st	38	28	6	4	107	26	62						(Spain) Ricardo Alós	46
1957–58	1ª	12th	30	10	4	16	46	57	24	R16					(Spain) Pepe Ortiz	11
1958–59	1ª	15th	30	7	6	17	25	70	20	R16					(Spain) Vicente Iborra	5
1959–60	2ª	5th	30	14	4	12	56	44	32	QF					(Spain) Pepe Ortiz	13
1960–61	2ª	13th	30	10	5	15	41	53	25	R32					(Spain) Pepe Ortiz	13
1960–61	2ª	RP	4	1	1	2	8	9	→	R32					(Spain) Pepe Ortiz	13
1961–62	2ª	13th	30	10	5	15	52	63	25	1R					(Spain) Chapela	23
1962–63	2ª	5th	30	16	2	12	50	46	34	R32					(Spain) Rafael Biempica	11
1963–64	2ª	2nd	30	17	5	8	53	33	39	1R					(Spain) Pocholo	13
1963–64	2ª	L	2	1	0	1	1	3	→	1R					(Spain) Pocholo	13
1964–65	2ª	3rd	30	13	12	5	61	32	38	QF					(Spain) Pocholo (Spain) Francisco Solabarrieta	18
1965–66	2ª	3rd	30	15	6	9	67	50	36	R32					(Spain) Miguel Montes	15
1966–67	2ª	2nd	30	19	7	4	55	22	45	1R					(Spain) Francisco Solabarrieta	24
1966–67	2ª	L	2	0	0	2	0	2	→	1R					(Spain) Francisco Solabarrieta	24
1967–68	2ª	5th	30	13	8	9	47	38	34	R32					(Spain) Francisco Solabarrieta (Spain) Pocholo	24
1968–69	2ª	5th	38	16	10	12	60	46	42						(Spain) Quini	15
1969–70	2ª	1st	38	23	8	7	77	32	54	4R					(Spain) Quini	21
1971–72	1ª	11th	34	12	8	14	41	37	32	R16					(Spain) Quini	9
1972–73	1ª	14th	34	11	7	16	32	37	29	SF					(Spain) Quini	11
1973–74	1ª	13th	34	13	4	17	49	59	30	5R					(Spain) Quini	20
1974–75	1ª	14th	34	11	10	13	40	40	32	4R					(Spain) Quini	12
1975–76	1ª	18th	34	7	10	17	41	46	24	R16					(Spain) Quini	21
1976–77	2ª	1st	38	18	11	9	62	35	47	3R					(Spain) Quini	26
1977–78	1ª	5th	34	15	9	10	53	43	39	SF					(Spain) Quini	15
1978–79	1ª	2nd	34	17	9	8	50	35	43	3R	UEFA Cup	R32			(Spain) Quini	23
1979–80	1ª	3rd	34	16	7	11	47	34	39	SF	UEFA Cup	R64			(Spain) Quini	24
1980–81	1ª	7th	34	14	10	10	58	40	38	RU	UEFA Cup	R64			(Argentina) Enzo Ferrero	15
1981–82	1ª	14th	34	10	9	15	38	44	29	RU					(Portugal) Fernando Gomes	11
1982–83	1ª	8th	34	9	15	10	31	32	33	SF			Copa de la Liga	3R	(Spain) Abel	8
1983–84	1ª	13th	34	11	8	15	38	47	30	QF			Copa de la Liga	QF	(Spain) Antonio Maceda (Spain) Nacho	5
1984–85	1ª	4th	34	13	15	6	34	23	41	QF			Copa de la Liga	SF	(Spain) Eloy (Spain) Quini	9
1985–86	1ª	6th	34	13	15	6	37	27	41	3R	UEFA Cup	R64	Copa de la Liga	QF	(Spain) Eloy	9
1986–87	1ª	4th	44	16	13	15	58	50	35	2R					(Mexico) Luis Flores	12
1987–88	1ª	9th	38	14	10	14	44	49	38	R16	UEFA Cup	R64			(Spain) Joaquín	15
1988–89	1ª	13th	38	13	9	16	42	42	35	R16					(Spain) Joaquín	10
1989–90	1ª	13th	38	12	10	16	37	34	34	QF					(Spain) Narciso	11
1990–91	1ª	5th	38	16	12	10	50	37	44	SF					(Czechoslovakia) Milan Luhový	16
1991–92	1ª	8th	38	15	8	15	37	43	38	SF	UEFA Cup	R32			(Spain) Monchu	11
1992–93	1ª	12th	38	11	12	15	38	57	34	R16					(Spain) Juanele	7
1993–94	1ª	14th	38	15	5	18	42	57	35	R16					(Spain) Xavier Escaich (Spain) Juanele	8
1994–95	1ª	18th	38	8	12	18	42	67	28	SF					(Spain) Pier	11
1994–95	1ª	W	2	1	1	0	5	4	→	SF					(Spain) Pier	11
1995–96	1ª	18th	42	13	7	22	51	60	46	R16					(Spain) Julio Salinas	18
1996–97	1ª	15th	42	13	11	18	45	63	50	3R					(Russia) Dmitri Cheryshev	8
1997–98	1ª	20th	38	2	7	29	31	80	13	2R					(Russia) Dmitri Cheryshev	6
1998–99	2ª	9th	42	16	11	15	47	47	59	4R					(Russia) Dmitri Cheryshev	13
1999–2000	2ª	9th	42	17	9	16	54	48	60	2R					(Russia) Dmitri Cheryshev	13
2000–01	2ª	7th	42	17	12	13	55	49	63	R64					(Spain) Manel	11
2001–02	2ª	6th	42	17	13	12	57	47	64	R16					(Spain) David Villa	18
2002–03	2ª	10th	42	11	20	11	44	41	53	R64					(Spain) David Villa	20
2003–04	2ª	5th	42	20	10	12	58	40	70	R64					(Croatia) Mate Bilić	15
2004–05	2ª	11th	42	15	12	15	41	39	57	R64					(Spain) Irurzun	13
2005–06	2ª	9th	42	13	17	12	41	34	56	1R					(Argentina) Pablo Calandria	12
2006–07	2ª	13th	42	16	8	18	53	53	56	2R					(Colombia) Edwin Congo	11
2007–08	2ª	3rd	42	20	12	10	61	40	72	2R					(Spain) Kike Mateo	12
2008–09	1ª	14th	38	14	1	23	47	79	43	QF					(Croatia) Mate Bilić	12
2009–10	1ª	15th	38	9	13	16	36	51	40	R32					(Spain) Diego Castro	10
2010–11	1ª	10th	38	11	14	13	35	42	47	R32					(Spain) Diego Castro	9
2011–12	1ª	19th	38	10	7	21	42	69	37	R32					(Spain) David Barral	10
2012–13	2ª	10th	42	15	11	16	60	53	56	R32					(Spain) David Rodríguez	12
2013–14	2ª	5th	42	16	16	10	63	51	64	2R					(Serbia) Stefan Šćepović	23
2013–14	2ª	PP	2	0	0	2	0	2	→	2R					(Serbia) Stefan Šćepović	23
2014–15	2ª	2nd	42	21	19	2	57	27	82	2R					(Spain) Miguel Ángel Guerrero	11
2015–16	1ª	17th	38	10	9	19	40	62	39	R32					(Paraguay) Antonio Sanabria	11
2016–17	1ª	18th	38	7	10	21	42	72	31	R32					(Croatia) Duje Čop	9
2017–18	2ª	4th	42	21	8	13	60	40	71	3R					(Uruguay) Michael Santos	17
2017–18	2ª	PP	2	0	0	2	2	5	→	3R					(Uruguay) Michael Santos	17
2018–19	2ª	9th	42	16	13	13	43	38	61	R16					(Serbia) Uroš Đurđević	11
2019–20	2ª	13th	42	14	12	16	40	38	54	1R					(Spain) Aitor García	7
2020–21	2ª	7th	42	17	14	11	37	28	65	R32					(Montenegro) Uroš Đurđević	22
2021–22	2ª	17th	42	11	13	18	43	48	46	R16					(Montenegro) Uroš Đurđević	14
2022–23	2ª	17th	42	11	17	14	43	48	50	R16					(Spain) Aitor García (Colombia) Juan Otero	6
2023–24	2ª	5th	42	18	11	13	51	42	65	2R					(Spain) Gaspar Campos (Colombia) Juan Otero	10
2023–24	2ª	PP	2	0	1	1	0	1	→	2R					(Spain) Gaspar Campos (Colombia) Juan Otero	10
2024–25	2ª	11th	42	14	14	14	57	54	56	2R					(Colombia) Juan Otero	12
Season	Div	Pos	Pld	W	D	L	GF	GA	Pts	Cup	Europe		Other competitions		Player(s)	Goal
Season	League									Cup	Europe		Other competitions		Top scorer(s)	
