= 1988–89 Sporting de Gijón season =

Real Sporting
1988–89 season
- Chairman: Ramón Muñoz
- Manager: Jesús Aranguren
- Stadium: El Molinón
- La Liga: 13th
- Copa del Rey: Round of 16
- Top goalscorer: Joaquín (10)

The 1988–89 Sporting de Gijón season was the 28th season of the club in La Liga, the 14th consecutive after its last promotion.

== Squad ==
Note: Flags indicate national team as defined under FIFA eligibility rules; some limited exceptions apply. Players may hold more than one non-FIFA nationality.

No.	Pos.	Nation	Player
—	GK	ESP	Ablanedo II
—	GK	ESP	Pedro Rodríguez
—	GK	ESP	Isidro Fernández
—	DF	ESP	Manolo Jiménez
—	DF	ESP	Tati
—	DF	ESP	Ángel Alcázar
—	DF	ESP	Roberto
—	DF	ESP	Ablanedo I
—	DF	IRL	Kevin Moran
—	DF	ESP	Cundi
—	DF	ESP	Luis Sierra
—	DF	ESP	Francisco Mariño

No.	Pos.	Nation	Player
—	MF	ESP	Joaquín
—	MF	ESP	Iñaki Eraña
—	MF	ESP	Emilio
—	MF	ESP	Jaime
—	MF	ESP	Juanma
—	MF	ESP	Óscar
—	MF	ESP	Torres
—	MF	ESP	Marcelino
—	FW	ESP	Felipe
—	FW	ESP	Narciso
—	FW	ESP	Joaquín Villa
—	FW	ESP	Monchu

== Competitions ==
=== La Liga ===
==== Results by round ====
Round	1	2	3	4	5	6	7	8	9	10	11	12	13	14	15	16	17	18	19	20	21	22	23	24	25	26	27	28	29	30	31	32	33	34	35	36	37	38
Ground	A	H	A	H	A	H	A	H	A	H	A	H	A	H	A	A	A	H	H	H	A	H	A	H	A	H	A	H	A	H	A	H	A	H	A	H	H	A
Result	W	D	D	W	L	L	L	W	W	D	D	W	L	W	D	D	L	W	W	D	L	L	W	L	W	L	L	L	L	D	W	L	L	W	L	W	D	L
Position	6	6	7	4	9	12	14	12	9	8	6	5	7	5	6	6	8	6	4	4	7	9	8	9	8	8	10	11	13	13	12	12	12	11	13	11	12	13

Source: BDFutbol
A = Away; H = Home; W = Win; D = Draw; L = Loss

==== League table ====
Pos	Team	Pld	W	D	L	GF	GA	GD	Pts
11	Real Sociedad	38	11	14	13	38	47	−9	36
12	Oviedo	38	12	11	15	41	48	−7	35
13	Sporting Gijón	38	13	9	16	42	42	0	35
14	Logroñés	38	9	16	13	25	37	−12	34
15	Cádiz	38	9	15	14	31	41	−10	33

Source: BDFútbol

=== Matches ===
4 September 1988 1	Real Betis	0–1	Real Sporting	Seville
		Report	Narciso 65'; Juanma (yellow card) 0' (yellow-red card) 73'	Stadium: Benito Villamarín; Referee: Urío Velázquez

11 September 1988 2	Real Sporting	2–2	Real Madrid	Gijón
	Narciso 66'; Joaquín Villa 83'	Report	Hugo Sánchez 14' (pen.); Míchel 22'	Stadium: El Molinón; Referee: Pes Pérez

18 September 1988 3	Zaragoza	1–1	Real Sporting	Zaragoza
	Pardeza 89'	Report	Juan Carlos 65' (o.g.)	Stadium: La Romareda; Referee: Jiménez Muñoz

25 September 1988 4	Real Sporting	2–1	Valladolid	Gijón
	Juanma 26'; Felipe 85'	Report	Minguela 76' (pen.)	Stadium: El Molinón; Referee: Mazorra Freire

2 October 1988 5	Barcelona	4–0	Real Sporting	Barcelona
	Serna 1', 3'; Julio Salinas 7', 64'	Report		Stadium: Nou Camp; Referee: Calvo Córdova

9 October 1988 6	Real Sporting	0–1	Murcia	Gijón
		Report	Mejías 52'	Stadium: El Molinón; Referee: Ansuategui Roca

16 October 1988 7	Celta	2–1	Real Sporting	Vigo
	Atilano 47'; Amarildo 89' (pen.)	Report	Joaquín 76'	Stadium: Balaídos; Referee: Urizar Azpitarte

23 October 1988 8	Real Sporting	3–0	Logroñés	Gijón
	Joaquín 42' (pen.); Emilio 47'; Monchu 89'	Report		Stadium: El Molinón; Referee: López Nieto

30 October 1988 9	Athletic Bilbao	1–4	Real Sporting	Bilbao
	Argote 47'	Report	Joaquín 20'; Narciso 23', 40'; Monchu 89'	Stadium: San Mamés; Referee: Sánchez Molina Soto

6 November 1988 10	Real Sporting	0–0	Sevilla	Gijón
		Report		Stadium: El Molinón; Referee: Albert Giménez

20 November 1988 11	Atlético Madrid	0–0	Real Sporting	Madrid
		Report		Stadium: Vicente Calderón; Referee: Peraita Ibáñez

27 November 1988 12	Real Sporting	1–0	Cádiz	Gijón
	Joaquín 24' (pen.)	Report		Stadium: El Molinón; Referee: Jiménez Muñoz

30 November 1988 13	Málaga	1–0	Real Sporting	Málaga
	Paquito 9'	Report		Stadium: La Rosaleda; Referee: Díaz Agüero

4 December 1988 14	Real Sporting	2–1	Español	Gijón
	Joaquín 9'; Joaquín Villa 20'	Report	Francis 65'	Stadium: El Molinón; Referee: Urío Velázquez

11 December 1988 15	Elche	0–0	Real Sporting	Elche
		Report		Stadium: Manuel Martínez Valero; Referee: Sánchez Molina Soto

1 January 1989 16	Osasuna	0–0	Real Sporting	Pamplona
		Report		Stadium: El Sadar; Referee: Alfonso Álvarez

8 January 1989 17	Oviedo	0–0	Real Sporting	Oviedo
	Tomás 81'	Report		Stadium: Carlos Tartiere; Referee: Enríquez Negreira

11 January 1989 18	Real Sporting	1–0	Valencia	Gijón
	Joaquín Villa 49'	Report		Stadium: El Molinón; Referee: López Nieto

15 January 1989 19	Real Sporting	4–2	Real Sporting	Gijón
	Eraña 12'; Felipe 50'; Joaquín 71' (pen.), 87' (pen.)	Report	Martín Begiristain 16'; Bakero 20'	Stadium: El Molinón; Referee: Valdés Sánchez

29 January 1989 20	Real Sporting	0–0	Real Betis	Gijón
		Report		Stadium: El Molinón; Referee: Urío Velázquez

12 February 1989 21	Real Madrid	5–1	Real Sporting	Madrid
	Gordillo 7'; Míchel 9', 70', 85'; Hugo Sánchez 89'	Report	Felipe 44'	Stadium: Santiago Bernabéu; Referee: Benavente Garasa

19 February 1989 22	Real Sporting	1–2	Zaragoza	Gijón
	Felipe 69'	Report	Fraile 10'; Iskrenov 57'	Stadium: El Molinón; Referee: Pérez Sánchez

26 February 1989 23	Valladolid	0–1	Real Sporting	Valladolid
		Report	Felipe 69'	Stadium: José Zorrilla; Referee: Pajares Paz

4 March 1989 24	Sporting de Gijón	0–2	Barcelona	Gijón
		Report	Roberto 23' (pen.); Begiristain 37'	Stadium: El Molinón; Referee: García de Loza

12 March 1989 25	Murcia	0–3	Real Sporting	Murcia
		Report	Felipe 19'; Joaquín Villa 77'; Eraña 89'	Stadium: La Condomina; Referee: Paz García

26 March 1989 26	Real Sporting	1–2	Celta	Gijón
	Narciso 72'	Report	Julio Prieto 28'; Amarildo 64'	Stadium: El Molinón; Referee: Alfonso Álvarez

2 April 1989 27	Logroñés	1–0	Real Sporting	Logroño
	Herrero 58'	Report		Stadium: Las Gaunas; Referee: Calvo Córdova

9 April 1989 28	Real Sporting	0–1	Athletic Bilbao	Gijón
		Report	Garitano 30'	Stadium: El Molinón; Referee: Andújar Oliver

16 April 1989 29	Sevilla	1–0	Real Sporting	Seville
	Cholo 89'	Report		Stadium: Ramón Sánchez Pizjuán; Referee: Albert Jiménez

30 April 1989 30	Real Sporting	2–2	Atlético Madrid	Gijón
	Joaquín 55' (pen.); Emilio 59'	Report	Baltazar 10'; Carlos 30'	Stadium: El Molinón; Referee: Urizar Azpitarte

7 May 1989 31	Cádiz	0–3	Real Sporting	Cádiz
		Report	Óscar 9'; Jiménez 69'; Joaquín 77'	Stadium: Ramón de Carranza; Referee: Pajares Paz

14 May 1989 32	Real Sporting	1–2	Málaga	Gijón
	Narciso 49'	Report	Luis Merino 1', 61'	Stadium: El Molinón; Referee: Taboada Soto

21 May 1989 33	Español	2–1	Real Sporting	Barcelona
	Escaich 68', 73'	Report	Joaquín Villa 89'	Stadium: Sarrià; Referee: Jiménez Muñoz

27 May 1989 34	Real Sporting	2–0	Elche	Gijón
	Joaquín Villa 15'; Felipe 49'	Report		Stadium: El Molinón; Referee: Jiménez Moreno

3 June 1989 35	Valencia	2–1	Real Sporting	Valencia
	Arroyo 39'; Fernando 62'	Report	Felipe 71'	Stadium: Luis Casanova; Referee: Martín Navarrete

10 June 1989 36	Real Sporting	2–1	Osasuna	Gijón
	Felipe 13'; Joaquín 40' (pen.)	Report	Roberto 88'	Stadium: El Molinón; Referee: Sánchez Moreno

17 June 1989 37	Real Sporting	0–0	Oviedo	Gijón
		Report		Stadium: El Molinón; Referee: Merino González

24 June 1989 38	Real Sociedad	2–1	Real Sporting	San Sebastián
	Martín Begiristain 14'; Fuentes 50'	Report	Óscar 81'	Stadium: Atotxa; Referee: López Nieto

=== Copa del Rey ===
==== Matches ====
25 January 1989 Round of 32; First leg	Tenerife	2–1	Real Sporting	Santa Cruz de Tenerife
	Guina 41', 59'	Report	Felipe 51'	Stadium: Heliodoro Rodríguez López; Referee: Merino González

1 February 1989 Round of 32; Second leg	Real Sporting	5–1 (6–2 agg.)	Tenerife	Gijón
	Narciso 58', 68', 74'; Eraña 65'; Felipe 81'	Report	Rommel 51'	Stadium: El Molinón; Referee: Marín López

16 February 1989 Round of 16; First leg	Real Sporting	5–5	Real Madrid	Gijón
	Joaquín 20' (pen.), 44' (pen.); Felipe 74'; Narciso 76'; Villa 80'	Report	Esteban 6'; Losada 8', 57'; Schuster 65'; Sanchís 72'	Stadium: El Molinón; Referee: Sánchez Arminio

22 February 1989 Round of 16; Second leg	Real Madrid	5–2 (10–7 agg.)	Real Sporting	Madrid
	Schuster 44'; Hugo Sánchez 55', 66'; Losada 81'; Míchel 89'	Report	Joaquín 38'; Gallego 73' (o.g.)	Stadium: Santiago Bernabéu; Referee: Sánchez Arminio

== Squad statistics ==
=== Appearances and goals ===
No.	Pos	Nat	Player	Total		La Liga		Copa del Rey	
No.	Pos	Nat	Player	Apps	Goals	Apps	Goals	Apps	Goals
	GK	(Spain) ESP	Pedro Rodríguez	23	0	19+0	0	3+1	0
	GK	(Spain) ESP	Ablanedo II	19	0	18+0	0	1+0	0
	GK	(Spain) ESP	Isidro Fernández	1	0	1+0	0	0+0	0
	DF	(Spain) ESP	Manolo Jiménez	41	1	37+0	1	4+0	0
	DF	(Spain) ESP	Tati	38	0	34+0	0	4+0	0
	DF	(Spain) ESP	Roberto	1	0	1+0	0	0+0	0
	DF	(Spain) ESP	Ablanedo I	36	0	28+4	0	4+0	0
	DF	(Republic of Ireland) IRL	Kevin Moran	28	0	27+0	0	1+0	0
	DF	(Spain) ESP	Cundi	15	0	11+3	0	1+0	0
	DF	(Spain) ESP	Luis Sierra	25	0	18+3	0	3+1	0
	MF	(Spain) ESP	Joaquín	42	13	38+0	10	4+0	3
	MF	(Spain) ESP	Iñaki Eraña	40	3	26+10	2	4+0	1
	MF	(Spain) ESP	Emilio	32	2	26+5	2	1+0	0
	MF	(Spain) ESP	Jaime	27	0	23+0	0	4+0	0
	MF	(Spain) ESP	Juanma	27	1	9+16	1	1+1	0
	MF	(Spain) ESP	Óscar	15	2	14+1	2	0+0	0
	MF	(Spain) ESP	Torres	10	0	3+3	0	4+0	0
	MF	(Spain) ESP	Marcelino	4	0	0+3	0	0+1	0
	FW	(Spain) ESP	Felipe	36	12	23+9	9	3+1	3
	FW	(Spain) ESP	Narciso	35	10	24+8	6	2+1	4
	FW	(Spain) ESP	Joaquín Villa	40	7	36+0	6	4+0	1
	FW	(Spain) ESP	Monchu	9	2	2+7	2	0+0	0
