= 1987–88 Sporting de Gijón season =

Real Sporting
1987–88 season
- Chairman: Ramón Muñoz
- Manager: José Manuel Díaz Novoa
- Stadium: El Molinón
- La Liga: 13th
- Copa del Rey: Round of 16
- UEFA Cup: Round of 64
- Top goalscorer: Joaquín (15)

The 1987–88 Sporting de Gijón season was the 27th season of the club in La Liga, the 13th consecutive after its last promotion.

== Overview ==
Despite a bad start of the season, Sporting ended the league in the ninth position.

In their fifth participation in the UEFA Cup, the club was eliminated in the first round by Milan, despite winning the first leg at El Molinón by 1–0.

== Squad ==
Note: Flags indicate national team as defined under FIFA eligibility rules; some limited exceptions apply. Players may hold more than one non-FIFA nationality.

No.	Pos.	Nation	Player
—	GK	ESP	Ablanedo II
—	GK	ESP	Isidro Fernández
—	GK	ESP	Pedro Rodríguez
—	DF	ESP	Arturo
—	DF	ESP	Cundi
—	DF	ESP	Ablanedo I
—	DF	ESP	Manolo Jiménez
—	DF	ESP	Esteban
—	DF	ESP	José Manuel Espinosa
—	DF	ESP	Marino
—	DF	ESP	Luis Sierra
—	DF	ESP	Tati

No.	Pos.	Nation	Player
—	MF	ESP	Iñaki Eraña
—	MF	ESP	Marcelino
—	MF	ESP	Juanma
—	MF	ESP	Emilio
—	MF	ESP	Joaquín
—	MF	ESP	Jaime
—	FW	ESP	Zurdi
—	FW	URU	Wilmar Cabrera
—	FW	ESP	Eloy
—	FW	ESP	Felipe
—	FW	ESP	Luismi
—	FW	ESP	Joaquín Villa

== Competitions ==
=== La Liga ===
==== Results by round ====
Round	1	2	3	4	5	6	7	8	9	10	11	12	13	14	15	16	17	18	19	20	21	22	23	24	25	26	27	28	29	30	31	32	33	34	35	36	37	38
Ground	H	A	A	H	A	H	A	H	A	H	A	H	A	H	A	H	A	H	A	A	H	H	A	H	A	H	A	H	A	H	A	H	A	H	A	H	A	H
Result	D	L	L	W	D	W	L	L	D	D	W	W	L	W	W	W	L	D	L	L	L	W	L	W	L	D	W	D	D	W	L	W	L	W	L	W	D	D
Position	10	17	20	16	14	11	14	16	17	16	13	12	12	12	8	6	8	8	10	12	13	11	13	12	12	11	10	10	11	8	10	8	10	10	10	10	10	9

Source: BDFutbol
A = Away; H = Home; W = Win; D = Draw; L = Loss

==== League table ====
Pos	Team	Pld	W	D	L	GF	GA	GD	Pts
7	Celta Vigo	38	14	11	13	43	40	+3	39
8	Valladolid	38	13	12	13	31	34	−3	38
9	Sporting Gijón	38	14	10	14	44	49	−5	38
10	Sevilla	38	13	11	14	41	46	−5	37
11	Zaragoza	38	11	14	13	54	56	−2	36

Source: BDFútbol
Rules for classification: 1) Points; 2) Head-to-head results; 3) Goal difference; 4) Number of goals scored

==== Matches ====
29 August 1987 1	Real Sporting	0–0	Valladolid	Gijón
		Report		Stadium: El Molinón; Referee: Benavente Garasa

6 September 1987 2	Real Madrid	7–0	Real Sporting	Madrid
	Gordillo 28'; Hugo Sánchez 45', 56', 73' (pen.); Sanchís 65'; Martín Vázquez 77'; Míchel 85'	Report		Stadium: Santiago Bernabéu; Referee: Socorro González

12 September 1987 3	Cádiz	2–0	Real Sporting	Cádiz
	Ablanedo I 36' (o.g.); Francis 85'	Report	Emilio (yellow card) 0' (yellow-red card) 78'	Stadium: Ramón de Carranza; Referee: Jiménez Moreno

20 September 1987 4	Real Sporting	2–1	Zaragoza	Gijón
	Eloy 44'; Juanma 78'	Report	Orejuela 70'	Stadium: El Molinón; Referee: Enríquez Negreira

27 September 1987 5	Osasuna	0–0	Real Sporting	Pamplona
		Report		Stadium: El Sadar; Referee: Pajares Paz

4 October 1987 6	Real Sporting	4–1	Las Palmas	Gijón
	Juanma 18'; Padrón 49' (o.g.); Villa 68', 87'	Report	Andrés 3'	Stadium: El Molinón; Referee: Paz García

18 October 1987 7	Sevilla	2–0	Real Sporting	Seville
	Bengoechea 17'; Ramón 59'	Report		Stadium: Ramón Sánchez Pizjuán; Referee: Benavente Garasa

25 October 1987 8	Real Sporting	1–2	Español	Gijón
	Joaquín 28'	Report	Zubillaga 38'; Pineda 59'	Stadium: El Molinón; Referee: Peraita Ibáñez

1 November 1987 9	Valencia	1–1	Real Sporting	Valencia
	Fernando 20' (pen.)	Report	Joaquín 30' (pen.)	Stadium: Luis Casanova; Referee: Pérez Sánchez

8 November 1987 10	Real Sporting	2–2	Athletic Bilbao	Gijón
	Villa 23', 50'	Report	Sarabia 65'; Uralde 72'	Stadium: El Molinón; Referee: Andújar Oliver

20 November 1987 11	Atlético Madrid	1–2	Real Sporting	Madrid
	Landáburu 9'	Report	Eloy 61'; Villa 70'	Stadium: Vicente Calderón; Referee: Riera Morro

29 November 1987 12	Real Sporting	3–0	Sabadell	Gijón
	Villa 63', 68'; Cabrera 65'	Report		Stadium: El Molinón; Referee: Sánchez Moreno

6 December 1987 13	Mallorca	2–0	Real Sporting	Palma
	Higuera 11', 84'	Report		Stadium: Lluís Sitjar; Referee: Urío Velázquez

13 December 1987 14	Real Sporting	1–0	Logroñés	Gijón
	Cabrera 66'	Report	Gelucho (yellow card) 0' (yellow-red card) 88'	Stadium: El Molinón; Referee: Alfonso Álvarez

20 December 1987 15	Celta	1–3	Real Sporting	Vigo
	Moyano 89'	Report	Eraña 13'; Joaquín 31'; Eloy 77'	Stadium: Balaídos; Referee: Pes Pérez

3 January 1988 16	Real Sporting	1–0	Real Betis	Gijón
	Juanma 69'	Report		Stadium: El Molinón; Referee: Sánchez Molina Soto

9 January 1988 17	Barcelona	1–0	Real Sporting	Barcelona
	Roberto 77'	Report		Stadium: Nou Camp; Referee: Pérez Sánchez

17 January 1988 18	Real Sporting	1–1	Murcia	Gijón
	Joaquín 2' (pen.)	Report	Eugenio 77'	Stadium: El Molinón; Referee: Albert Giménez

24 January 1988 19	Real Sociedad	3–0	Real Sporting	San Sebastián
	Bakero 33', 47'; Gajate 86'	Report		Stadium: Atotxa; Referee: Martín Navarrete

29 January 1988 20	Valladolid	2–0	Real Sporting	Valladolid
	Manolo Hierro 52'; Fonseca 89'	Report		Stadium: José Zorrilla; Referee: Brito Arceo

7 February 1988 21	Real Sporting	1–2	Real Madrid	Gijón
	Juanma 16'	Report	Martín Vázquez 47'; Hugo Sánchez 85'	Stadium: El Molinón; Referee: Urizar Azpitarte

10 February 1988 22	Real Sporting	3–0	Cádiz	Gijón
	Luis Sierra 42'; Joaquín 74' (pen.), 77'	Report		Stadium: El Molinón; Referee: Pérez Sánchez

14 February 1988 23	Zaragoza	2–0	Real Sporting	Zaragoza
	Rubén Sosa 10'; Pardeza 84'	Report		Stadium: La Romareda; Referee: Mazorra Freire

21 February 1988 24	Real Sporting	1–0	Osasuna	Gijón
	Villa 87'	Report		Stadium: El Molinón; Referee: Díaz Agüero

28 February 1988 25	Las Palmas	5–2	Real Sporting	Las Palmas
	Ablanedo I 1' (o.g.); Narciso 3', 25'; Contreras 25'; Dajka 30'	Report	Villa 45'; Joaquín 78'	Stadium: Insular; Referee: Enríquez Negreira

6 March 1988 26	Real Sporting	0–0	Sevilla	Gijón
		Report	Nando (yellow card) 0' (yellow-red card) 77'	Stadium: El Molinón; Referee: Peraita Ibáñez

9 March 1988 27	Español	1–3	Real Sporting	Barcelona
	Alonso 23'	Report	Joaquín 39' (pen.); Villa 76', 84'	Stadium: Sarrià; Referee: Pajares Paz

13 March 1988 28	Real Sporting	2–2	Valencia	Gijón
	Joaquín 47' (pen.); Emilio 52'	Report	Subirats 11'; Montes 74'	Stadium: El Molinón; Referee: Calvo Córdova

20 March 1988 29	Athletic Bilbao	1–1	Real Sporting	Bilbao
	Ferreira 78'	Report	Joaquín 54'	Stadium: San Mamés; Referee: Albert Jiménez

26 March 1988 30	Real Sporting	2–0	Atlético Madrid	Gijón
	Joaquín 7'; Morgado 45' (o.g.)	Report	Morgado (yellow card) 0' (yellow-red card) 82'	Stadium: El Molinón; Referee: Marín López

3 April 1988 31	Sabadell	1–0	Real Sporting	Sabadell
	Sánchez 3'	Report		Stadium: Nova Creu Alta; Referee: Bayarri Ribelles

10 April 1988 32	Real Sporting	2–1	Mallorca	Gijón
	Joaquín 10' (pen.), 73'	Report	Hassan 60'	Stadium: El Molinón; Referee: Alfonso Álvarez

17 April 1988 33	Logroñés	1–0	Real Sporting	Logroño
	Adolfo Muñoz 86'	Report		Stadium: Las Gaunas; Referee: Mazorra Freire

24 April 1988 34	Real Sporting	4–1	Celta	Gijón
	Juanma 6', 59', 63' (yellow card) 0' (yellow-red card) 88'; Joaquín 61' (pen.)	Report	Pichi Lucas 69'	Stadium: El Molinón; Referee: Caetano Bueno

1 May 1988 35	Real Betis	2–0	Real Sporting	Seville
	Valentín 46'; Chano 73'	Report		Stadium: Benito Villamarín; Referee: Calvo Córdova

8 May 1988 36	Real Sporting	1–0	Barcelona	Gijón
	Joaquín 87'	Report		Stadium: El Molinón; Referee: Pérez Sánchez

15 May 1988 37	Murcia	0–0	Real Sporting	Murcia
		Report		Stadium: La Condomina; Referee: Mazorra Freire

21 May 1988 38	Real Sporting	1–1	Real Sociedad	Gijón
	Villa 11'	Report	Zamora 36'	Stadium: El Molinón; Referee: Pérez Sánchez

=== Copa del Rey ===
==== Matches ====
12 November 1987 Round of 32; First leg	Barcelona Atlètic	0–2	Real Sporting	Barcelona
		Report (in Spanish)	Villa 13'; Zurdi 16'	Stadium: Mini Estadi; Referee: Marín López

2 December 1987 Round of 32; Second leg	Real Sporting	3–0	Barcelona Atlètic	Gijón
	Juanma 19'; Eloy 27'; Cabrera 87'	Report (in Spanish)		Stadium: El Molinón; Referee: Pérez Sánchez

16 December 1987 Round of 16; First leg	Sporting de Gijón	0–0	Real Sociedad	Gijón
20:30		Report (in Spanish)		Stadium: El Molinón; Referee: Ramos Marcos

6 January 1988 Round of 16; Second leg	Real Sociedad	4–0	Real Sporting	San Sebastián
17:00	Begiristain 23'; Bakero 50', 76', 88'	Report (in Spanish)		Stadium: Atotxa; Referee: Enríquez Negreira

=== UEFA Cup ===
16 September 1987 Round of 64; First leg	Real Sporting	1–0	(Italy) Milan	Gijón
20:30	Jaime 69'	Report		Stadium: El Molinón; Referee: Ronald Bridges (WAL)

30 September 1987 Round of 64; Second leg	Milan (Italy)	3–0 (3–1 agg.)	Real Sporting	Lecce (Note: Milan played their home match at Lecce due to the ban on San Siro, Milan.)
15:00	Virdis 21' (pen.), 45+' (pen.); Gullit 43'	Report		Stadium: Stadio Via del Mare; Referee: Zoran Petrović (YUG)

== Squad statistics ==
=== Appearances and goals ===
No.	Pos	Nat	Player	Total		La Liga		UEFA Cup	
No.	Pos	Nat	Player	Apps	Goals	Apps	Goals	Apps	Goals
	GK	(Spain) ESP	Ablanedo II	28	0	28+0	0	0+0	0
	GK	(Spain) ESP	Isidro Fernández	0	0	0+0	0	0+0	0
	GK	(Spain) ESP	Pedro Rodríguez	12	0	10+0	0	2+0	0
	DF	(Spain) ESP	Arturo	3	0	0+3	0	0+0	0
	DF	(Spain) ESP	Cundi	5	0	2+2	0	1+0	0
	DF	(Spain) ESP	Ablanedo I	39	0	37+0	0	2+0	0
	DF	(Spain) ESP	Manolo Jiménez	39	0	37+0	0	2+0	0
	DF	(Spain) ESP	Esteban	30	0	29+1	0	0+0	0
	DF	(Spain) ESP	José Manuel Espinosa	29	0	27+0	0	2+0	0
	DF	(Spain) ESP	Marino	1	0	0+1	0	0+0	0
	DF	(Spain) ESP	Luis Sierra	16	1	15+1	1	0+0	0
	DF	(Spain) ESP	Tati	13	0	11+0	0	2+0	0
	MF	(Spain) ESP	Iñaki Eraña	23	1	16+7	1	0+0	0
	MF	(Spain) ESP	Marcelino	29	0	19+8	0	0+2	0
	MF	(Spain) ESP	Juanma	38	7	23+13	7	0+2	0
	MF	(Spain) ESP	Emilio	38	1	36+0	1	2+0	0
	MF	(Spain) ESP	Joaquín	39	15	38+0	15	1+0	0
	MF	(Spain) ESP	Jaime	9	1	7+0	0	2+0	1
	MF	(Spain) ESP	Zurdi	29	0	12+15	0	2+0	0
	MF	(Uruguay) URU	Wilmar Cabrera	24	2	10+12	2	2+0	0
	FW	(Spain) ESP	Felipe	6	0	1+5	0	0+0	0
	FW	(Spain) ESP	Eloy	39	3	37+0	3	2+0	0
	FW	(Spain) ESP	Luismi	4	0	0+4	0	0+0	0
	FW	(Spain) ESP	Joaquín Villa	26	12	23+3	12	0+0	0
