= 1990–91 Sporting de Gijón season =

Real Sporting
1990–91 season
- Chairman: Plácido Rodríguez
- Manager: Ciriaco Cano
- Stadium: El Molinón
- La Liga: 5th
- Copa del Rey: Semifinals
- Top goalscorer: Milan Luhový (16)

The 1990–91 Sporting de Gijón season was the 29th season of the club in La Liga, the 15th consecutive after its last promotion.

== Overview ==
After a tough start of season, where Carlos García Cuervo was sacked after twelve rounds, Ciriaco Cano took the helm of the team to end in the fifth position, qualifying to the UEFA Cup for the sixth time in the club's history.

In the Copa del Rey, the club was eliminated in the semifinals by Mallorca.

== Squad ==
Note: Flags indicate national team as defined under FIFA eligibility rules; some limited exceptions apply. Players may hold more than one non-FIFA nationality.

| No. | Pos. | Nation | Player |
|---|---|---|---|
| — | GK | ESP | Ablanedo II |
| — | GK | ESP | Diego |
| — | GK | ESP | Isidro Fernández |
| — | DF | ESP | Arturo |
| — | DF | ESP | Ángel Alcázar |
| — | DF | ESP | Pablo |
| — | DF | ESP | Manolo Jiménez |
| — | DF | ESP | Abelardo |
| — | DF | ESP | Luis Sierra |
| — | DF | ESP | Tati |
| — | DF | ESP | José Díez Calleja |
| — | DF | ESP | David Miner |
| — | DF | ESP | Ablanedo I |
| — | MF | ESP | Emilio |

| No. | Pos. | Nation | Player |
|---|---|---|---|
| — | MF | TCH | Milan Luhový |
| — | MF | ESP | Francisco Javier Castaño |
| — | MF | ESP | Joaquín |
| — | MF | ESP | Juan Carlos |
| — | MF | ESP | Óscar |
| — | MF | ESP | Juanma |
| — | MF | BUL | Georgi Yordanov |
| — | MF | ESP | Torres |
| — | MF | SWE | Joakim Nilsson |
| — | FW | ESP | Luis Enrique |
| — | FW | ESP | Javier Manjarín |
| — | FW | ESP | Narciso |
| — | FW | ESP | Monchu |

== Competitions ==
=== La Liga ===
==== Results by round ====
| Round | 1 | 2 | 3 | 4 | 5 | 6 | 7 | 8 | 9 | 10 | 11 | 12 | 13 | 14 | 15 | 16 | 17 | 18 | 19 | 20 | 21 | 22 | 23 | 24 | 25 | 26 | 27 | 28 | 29 | 30 | 31 | 32 | 33 | 34 | 35 | 36 | 37 | 38 |
|---|---|---|---|---|---|---|---|---|---|---|---|---|---|---|---|---|---|---|---|---|---|---|---|---|---|---|---|---|---|---|---|---|---|---|---|---|---|---|
| Ground | A | H | A | H | A | H | H | A | H | A | H | A | H | A | H | A | H | A | H | H | A | H | A | H | A | A | H | A | H | A | H | A | H | A | H | A | H | A |
| Result | D | W | D | W | L | D | L | L | W | L | D | L | W | L | W | D | L | W | D | W | D | W | W | D | D | L | W | L | W | D | W | D | W | W | D | L | W | W |
| Position | 8 | 2 | 2 | 2 | 5 | 5 | 7 | 10 | 8 | 10 | 9 | 14 | 11 | 13 | 11 | 11 | 13 | 11 | 12 | 8 | 8 | 7 | 6 | 6 | 7 | 8 | 6 | 8 | 5 | 5 | 4 | 5 | 5 | 5 | 5 | 5 | 5 | 5 |

Source: BDFutbol
A = Away; H = Home; W = Win; D = Draw; L = Loss

==== League table ====
| Pos | Team | Pld | W | D | L | GF | GA | GD | Pts | Qualification or relegation |
|---|---|---|---|---|---|---|---|---|---|---|
| 3 | Real Madrid | 38 | 20 | 6 | 12 | 63 | 37 | +26 | 46 | Qualification for the UEFA Cup first round |
| 4 | Osasuna | 38 | 15 | 15 | 8 | 43 | 34 | +9 | 45 | Qualification for the UEFA Cup first round |
| 5 | Sporting Gijón | 38 | 16 | 12 | 10 | 50 | 37 | +13 | 44 | Qualification for the UEFA Cup first round |
| 6 | Oviedo | 38 | 13 | 16 | 9 | 36 | 35 | +1 | 42 | Qualification for the UEFA Cup first round |
| 7 | Valencia | 38 | 15 | 10 | 13 | 44 | 40 | +4 | 40 | |

Source: BDFútbol
Rules for classification: 1) Points; 2) Head-to-head results; 3) Goal difference; 4) Number of goals scored

=== Matches ===
| 1 September 1990 1 | Betis | 0–1 | Real Sporting | Seville |
| | Chano 41'; Mel 61' | Summary | Juan Carlos 14'; Arturo 76' | Stadium: Benito Villamarín; Referee: Pajares Paz |

| 9 September 1990 2 | Real Sporting | 4–0 | Valladolid | Gijón |
| | Narciso 32'; Yordanov 44'; Luis Enrique 88'; Arturo 89' | Summary | Patri (red card) 68' | Stadium: El Molinón; Referee: Gómez López |

| 16 September 1990 3 | Tenerife | 0–0 | Real Sporting | Santa Cruz de Tenerife |
| | | Summary | Luis Enrique (red card) 71' | Stadium: Heliodoro Rodríguez López; Referee: Alfonso Álvarez |

| 23 September 1990 4 | Real Sporting | 3–1 | Athletic Bilbao | Gijón |
| | Ablanedo I 12'; Manjarín 41'; Óscar 51' | Summary | Loren 74' | Stadium: El Molinón; Referee: Valdés Sánchez |

| 30 September 1990 5 | Osasuna | 2–1 | Real Sporting | Pamplona |
| | Sola 37'; Martín Domínguez 74' | Summary | Luis Enrique 76' | Stadium: El Sadar; Referee: García Prieto |

| 7 October 1990 6 | Real Sporting | 0–0 | Real Burgos | Gijón |
| | | Report | | Stadium: El Molinón; Referee: Martín Navarrete |

| 14 October 1990 7 | Real Sporting | 1–2 | Atlético Madrid | Gijón |
| | Jiménez (red card) 69'; Luhový 88' | Summary | Sabas 61'; Rodax 68' | Stadium: El Molinón; Referee: Ansuategui Roca |

| 20 October 1990 8 | Barcelona | 2–1 | Real Sporting | Barcelona |
| | Amor 9', 50'; Koeman 54' (pen.) | Summary | Óscar 1'; Luis Enrique 47' | Stadium: Camp Nou; Referee: Merino González |

| 28 October 1990 9 | Real Sporting | 1–0 | Castellón | Gijón |
| | Luis Enrique 63' | Report | | Stadium: El Molinón; Referee: Jiménez Muñoz |

| 3 November 1990 10 | Sevilla | 1–0 | Real Sporting | Seville |
| | Zamorano 6' | Report | | Stadium: Ramón Sánchez Pizjuán; Referee: Sosa Saavedra |

| 18 November 1990 11 | Real Sporting | 1–1 | Mallorca | Gijón |
| | Óscar 68'; Yordanov (red card) 80' | Summary | Vulić 75' (pen.) | Stadium: El Molinón; Referee: García de Loza |

| 25 November 1990 12 | Zaragoza | 4–0 | Real Sporting | Zaragoza |
| | Pardeza 36', 62', 81'; Mateuț 43' | Report | | Stadium: La Romareda; Referee: Brito Arceo |

| 2 December 1990 13 | Real Sporting | 3–1 | Cádiz | Gijón |
| | Juan José 32' (o.g.); Luhový 36', 50' | Report | José 80' (pen.) | Stadium: El Molinón; Referee: Taboada Soto |

| 9 December 1990 14 | Real Sociedad | 1–0 | Real Sporting | San Sebastián |
| | Agirre 18' | Report | | Stadium: Atotxa; Referee: Carcelén García |

| 16 December 1990 15 | Real Sporting | 1–0 | Logroñés | Gijón |
| | Luhový 74' | Summary | | Stadium: El Molinón; Referee: Soriano Aladrén |

| 30 December 1990 16 | Oviedo | 0–0 | Real Sporting | Oviedo |
| | Carlos (red card) 89' | Summary | Óscar (red card) 69' | Stadium: Carlos Tartiere; Referee: López Nieto |

| 6 January 1991 17 | Real Sporting | 0–2 | Real Madrid | Gijón |
| | | Report | Míchel 31'; Butragueño 80' | Stadium: El Molinón; Referee: Martín Navarrete |

| 13 January 1991 18 | Español | 0–2 | Real Sporting | Barcelona |
| | | Summary | Luhový 53'; Jiménez 89' | Stadium: Sarrià; Referee: Paz García |

| 20 January 1991 19 | Real Sporting | 1–1 | Valencia | Gijón |
| | Luhový 30' | Summary | Cuxart 25' | Stadium: El Molinón; Referee: Urío Velázquez |

| 27 January 1991 20 | Real Sporting | 4–0 | Betis | Gijón |
| | Manjarín 24'; Luhový 57'; Juanma 63'; Luis Enrique 70' | Summary | | Stadium: El Molinón; Referee: Gracia Redondo |

| 3 February 1991 21 | Valladolid | 0–0 | Real Sporting | Valladolid |
| | | Report | | Stadium: José Zorrilla; Referee: Enríquez Negreira |

| 10 February 1991 22 | Sporting de Gijón | 2–1 | Tenerife | Gijón |
| | Luhový 9'; Manjarín 34' | Summary | Quique Medina (red card); Rommel 89' | Stadium: El Molinón; Referee: González Lecue |

| 24 February 1991 23 | Athletic Bilbao | 1–2 | Real Sporting | Bilbao |
| | Loren 71' | Summary | Luis Enrique 72', 89' | Stadium: San Mamés; Referee: Martín Navarrete |

| 3 March 1991 24 | Real Sporting | 1–1 | Osasuna | Gijón |
| | Luis Enrique 32' | Summary | Ibáñez 25' (red card) 65' | Stadium: El Molinón; Referee: García Aranda |

| 10 March 1991 25 | Real Burgos | 1–1 | Real Sporting | Burgos |
| | Ayúcar 30'; Villena (red card) 39' | Summary | Manjarín 36' | Stadium: El Plantío; Referee: Miró Pastor |

| 17 March 1991 26 | Atlético Madrid | 3–1 | Real Sporting | Madrid |
| | Manolo 11', 22' (pen.); Juanito 74'; Tomás (red card) 82' | Summary | Luis Enrique 45' | Stadium: Vicente Calderón; Referee: Brito Arceo |

| 24 March 1991 27 | Real Sporting | 1–0 | Barcelona | Gijón |
| | Luis Enrique 32' | Summary | | Stadium: El Molinón; Referee: Valdés Sánchez |

| 31 March 1991 28 | Castellón | 3–2 | Real Sporting | Castelló de la Plana |
| | Dobrovolski 5'; Alcañiz 55'; Javi 82' | Summary | Abelardo 4'; Luhový 42' | Stadium: Castalia; Referee: García Prieto |

| 6 April 1991 29 | Real Sporting | 2–0 | Sevilla | Gijón |
| | Monchi 23' (o.g.); Manjarín 46' | Summary | | Stadium: El Molinón; Referee: Rubio Valdivieso |

| 14 April 1991 30 | Mallorca | 1–1 | Real Sporting | Palma |
| | Marcos 44' | Summary | Luhový 70' | Stadium: Lluís Sitjar; Referee: Sosa Saavedra |

| 21 April 1991 31 | Real Sporting | 1–0 | Zaragoza | Gijón |
| | Luhový 71' | Summary | | Stadium: El Molinón; Referee: Andradas Asurmendi |

| 28 April 1991 32 | Cádiz | 1–1 | Real Sporting | Cádiz |
| | Dertycia 74' | Summary | Luhový 23' | Stadium: Ramón de Carranza; Referee: Socorro González |

| 5 May 1991 33 | Real Sporting | 2–1 | Real Sociedad | Gijón |
| | Luhový 54' (pen.); Uría 83' (o.g.) | Summary | Uría 23' | Stadium: El Molinón; Referee: Gómez Barril |

| 11 May 1991 34 | Logroñés | 1–2 | Real Sporting | Logroño |
| | Aguilà 19'; Sarabia (red card) 83' | Summary | Luhový 78' (pen.), 89' | Stadium: Las Gaunas; Referee: Hernández Velázquez |

| 19 May 1991 35 | Real Sporting | 0–0 | Oviedo | Gijón |
| | | Summary | | Stadium: El Molinón; Referee: Ramos Marcos |

| 25 May 1991 36 | Real Madrid | 2–1 | Real Sporting | Madrid |
| | Butragueño 27', 37' | Summary | Luhový 57'; Tati (red card) 74' | Stadium: Santiago Bernabéu; Referee: López Nieto |

| 2 June 1991 37 | Real Sporting | 3–0 | Espanyol | Gijón |
| | Luis Enrique 47', 73', 89' | Summary | Sergio Morgado (red card) 82' | Stadium: El Molinón; Referee: Bello Blanco |

| 9 June 1991 38 | Valencia | 0–1 | Real Sporting | Valencia |
| | | Summary | Luis Enrique 26' | Stadium: Luis Casanova; Referee: Martín Navarrete |

=== Copa del Rey ===
==== Matches ====
| 8 November 1990 Third round First leg | Pontevedra | 3–3 | Real Sporting | Pontevedra |
| | Herrera 62', 80'; Rafa Sáez 85' | Report | Joaquín 53'; Manjarín 64', 73' | Stadium: Pasarón; Referee: Calvo Córdova |

| 21 November 1990 Third round Second leg | Real Sporting | 3–1 (6–4 agg.) | Pontevedra | Gijón |
| | Luhový 47'; Óscar 53'; Nilsson 65' | Report | Vicente 4' | Stadium: El Molinón; Referee: Valdés Sánchez |

| 13 December 1990 Fourth round First leg | Cultural Durango | 1–2 | Real Sporting | Durango |
| | Etxegoena 86' (pen.) | Report | Narciso 41', 56' (pen.) | Stadium: Tabira; Referee: Rubio Valdivieso |

| 2 January 1991 Fourth round Second leg | Real Sporting | 1–0 (3–1 agg.) | Cultural Durango | Gijón |
| | Narciso 85' | Report | | Stadium: El Molinón; Referee: Urío Velázquez |

| 9 January 1991 Fifth round First leg | Zaragoza | 1–1 | Real Sporting | Zaragoza |
| | Higuera 2' | Report | Narciso 90' | Stadium: La Romareda; Referee: Alfonso Álvarez |

| 23 January 1991 Fifth round Second leg | Real Sporting | 1–0 (2–1 agg.) | Zaragoza | Gijón |
| | Luis Enrique 60' | Report | | Stadium: El Molinón; Referee: Urízar Azpitarte |

| 6 February 1991 Round of 16; First leg | Real Sociedad | 1–1 | Real Sporting | San Sebastián |
| | Abelardo 32' (o.g.) | Report | Abelardo 89' | Stadium: Atocha; Attendance: 14,000; Referee: Calvo Córdova |

| 27 February 1991 Round of 16; Second leg | Real Sporting | 1–0 (2–1 agg.) | Real Sociedad | Gijón |
| | Luhový 63' | Report | | Stadium: El Molinón; Attendance: 13,000; Referee: Marín López |

| 12 June 1991 Quarterfinals; First leg | Logroñés | 2–0 | Real Sporting | Logroño |
| 21:00 | José María 56'; Aguilá 90' | Report | | Stadium: Las Gaunas; Attendance: 4,000; Referee: Enríquez Negreira |

| 16 June 1991 Quarterfinals; Second leg | Real Sporting | 3–0 (a.e.t.) (3–2 agg.) | Logroñés | Gijón |
| | Luis Enrique 15', 118'; Alcázar 80' | Report | | Stadium: El Molinón; Attendance: 25,000; Referee: Urío Velázquez |

| 19 June 1991 Semifinals; First leg | Real Sporting | 0–1 | Mallorca | Gijón |
| 21:00 | | Report | Nader 33' | Stadium: El Molinón; Attendance: 30,000; Referee: Pérez Sánchez |

| 23 June 1991 Semifinals; Second leg | Mallorca | 1–0 (2–0 agg.) | Real Sporting | Palma |
| | Cervera 90' | Report | | Stadium: Lluís Sitjar; Attendance: 25,000; Referee: Brito Arceo |

== Squad statistics ==
=== Appearances and goals ===
| No. | Pos | Nat | Player | Total | | La Liga | | Copa del Rey | |
| No. | Pos | Nat | Player | Apps | Goals | Apps | Goals | Apps | Goals |
|---|---|---|---|---|---|---|---|---|---|
| | GK | (Spain) ESP | Ablanedo II | 40 | 0 | 32+0 | 0 | 8+0 | 0 |
| | GK | (Spain) ESP | Diego | 5 | 0 | 5+0 | 0 | 0+0 | 0 |
| | GK | (Spain) ESP | Isidro Fernández | 5 | 0 | 1+0 | 0 | 4+0 | 0 |
| | DF | (Spain) ESP | Arturo | 37 | 2 | 22+5 | 2 | 10+0 | 0 |
| | DF | (Spain) ESP | Ángel Alcázar | 16 | 1 | 3+7 | 0 | 4+2 | 1 |
| | DF | (Spain) ESP | Pablo | 23 | 0 | 10+6 | 0 | 5+2 | 0 |
| | DF | (Spain) ESP | Manolo Jiménez | 44 | 1 | 32+3 | 1 | 9+0 | 0 |
| | DF | (Spain) ESP | Abelardo | 48 | 2 | 38+0 | 1 | 10+0 | 1 |
| | DF | (Spain) ESP | Luis Sierra | 28 | 0 | 22+0 | 0 | 6+0 | 0 |
| | DF | (Spain) ESP | Tati | 31 | 0 | 21+1 | 0 | 8+1 | 0 |
| | DF | (Spain) ESP | José Díez Calleja | 0 | 0 | 0+0 | 0 | 0+0 | 0 |
| | DF | (Spain) ESP | David Miner | 1 | 0 | 0+1 | 0 | 0+0 | 0 |
| | DF | (Spain) ESP | Ablanedo I | 5 | 1 | 5+0 | 1 | 0+0 | 0 |
| | MF | (Spain) ESP | Emilio | 20 | 0 | 7+3 | 0 | 8+2 | 0 |
| | MF | (Czechoslovakia) TCH | Milan Luhový | 39 | 18 | 28+3 | 16 | 8+0 | 2 |
| | MF | (Spain) ESP | Francisco Javier Castaño | 2 | 0 | 0+1 | 0 | 0+1 | 0 |
| | MF | (Spain) ESP | Joaquín | 40 | 1 | 32+0 | 0 | 7+1 | 1 |
| | MF | (Spain) ESP | Juan Carlos | 39 | 1 | 31+3 | 1 | 5+0 | 0 |
| | MF | (Spain) ESP | Óscar | 39 | 4 | 28+1 | 3 | 9+1 | 1 |
| | MF | (Spain) ESP | Juanma | 23 | 1 | 9+8 | 1 | 2+4 | 0 |
| | MF | (Bulgaria) BUL | Georgi Yordanov | 32 | 1 | 19+7 | 1 | 5+1 | 0 |
| | MF | (Spain) ESP | Torres | 0 | 0 | 0+0 | 0 | 0+0 | 0 |
| | MF | (Sweden) SWE | Joakim Nilsson | 29 | 1 | 19+4 | 0 | 2+4 | 1 |
| | FW | (Spain) ESP | Luis Enrique | 44 | 17 | 27+8 | 14 | 7+2 | 3 |
| | FW | (Spain) ESP | Javier Manjarín | 37 | 7 | 21+10 | 5 | 6+0 | 2 |
| | FW | (Spain) ESP | Narciso | 14 | 5 | 6+4 | 1 | 4+0 | 4 |
| | FW | (Spain) ESP | Monchu | 0 | 0 | 0+0 | 0 | 0+0 | 0 |
