= 1986–87 Sporting de Gijón season =

Sporting de Gijón
1986–87 season
- Chairman: Ramón Muñoz
- Manager: José Manuel Díaz Novoa
- Stadium: El Molinón
- La Liga: 4th
- Copa del Rey: Second round
- Top goalscorer: Luis Flores (12)

The 1985–86 Sporting de Gijón season was the 26th season of the club in La Liga, the 12th consecutive after its last promotion.

== Overview ==
On 28 February 1987, Real Sporting beat Barcelona by 0–4, thus becoming the largest win away of the club in La Liga.

After the regular season, Real Sporting qualified for the top group and finished the season in the fourth position, finally achieving qualification for the UEFA Cup.

== Squad ==
Note: Flags indicate national team as defined under FIFA eligibility rules; some limited exceptions apply. Players may hold more than one non-FIFA nationality.

No.	Pos.	Nation	Player
—	GK	ESP	Ablanedo II
—	GK	ESP	Pedro Rodríguez
—	GK	ESP	Isidro Fernández
—	DF	ESP	Fernando Tocornal
—	DF	ESP	Nicolás Pereda
—	DF	ESP	Ablanedo I
—	DF	ESP	Tomás Orbegozo
—	DF	ESP	Manolo Jiménez
—	DF	ESP	Cundi
—	DF	ESP	Esteban
—	DF	ESP	Tati
—	DF	ESP	José Manuel Espinosa
—	DF	ESP	Roberto
—	MF	ESP	Manuel Mesa

No.	Pos.	Nation	Player
—	MF	ESP	Joaquín
—	MF	ESP	Jaime
—	MF	ESP	Iñaki Eraña
—	MF	ESP	Marcelino
—	MF	ESP	Emilio
—	MF	ESP	Juanma
—	MF	MEX	Manuel Negrete
—	DF	ESP	Tino
—	FW	MEX	Luis Flores
—	FW	ESP	Eloy
—	FW	ESP	Quini
—	FW	ESP	Luismi
—	FW	ESP	Zurdi
—	FW	ESP	Joaquín Villa

== Competitions ==
=== La Liga ===
For the 1986–87 season, La Liga changed its format and after the classical round-robin tournament, teams were divided into three groups according to their league table where the six first teams would play for the title, teams between 7th and 12th for classification and the last six for avoiding the relegation.

These groups of the second stage consisted in a new round-robin tournament adding ten more rounds to the calendar.

==== Results by round ====
Round	1	2	3	4	5	6	7	8	9	10	11	12	13	14	15	16	17	18	19	20	21	22	23	24	25	26	27	28	29	30	31	32	33	34	35	36	37	38	39	40	41	42	43	44
Ground	H	A	H	A	H	A	A	H	A	H	A	H	A	H	A	H	A	A	H	A	H	A	H	H	A	H	A	H	A	H	A	H	A	H	A	H	H	H	H	H	A	A	H	A
Result	W	L	D	D	W	W	L	W	L	L	W	D	W	D	L	W	L	D	W	D	L	L	L	D	D	W	L	W	W	W	L	W	W	D	W	L	L	L	D	W	L	D	W	D
Position	4	10	10	10	4	3	6	5	6	12	8	6	5	6	7	6	7	8	5	6	7	10	10	10	10	8	10	8	6	4	7	6	6	4	4	6	5	6	6	5	5	5	4	4

Source: BDFutbol
A = Away; H = Home; W = Win; D = Draw; L = Loss

==== League table ====
Championship group
Pos	Team	Pld	W	D	L	GF	GA	GD	Pts	Qualification or relegation
1	Real Madrid	44	27	12	5	84	37	+47	66	Qualification for the European Cup first round
2	Barcelona	44	24	15	5	63	29	+34	63	Qualification for the UEFA Cup first round
3	Español	44	20	11	13	66	46	+20	51	Qualification for the UEFA Cup first round
4	Sporting Gijón	44	16	13	15	58	50	+8	45	Qualification for the UEFA Cup first round
5	Zaragoza	44	15	14	15	46	47	−1	44	
6	Mallorca	44	15	12	17	48	65	−17	42	

Source: BDFútbol
Rules for classification: 1) Points; 2) Head-to-head results; 3) Goal difference; 4) Number of goals scored

==== Matches ====
Regular season

30 August 1986 1	Real Sporting	2–0	Athletic Bilbao	Gijón
	Villa 2', 50'	Report		Stadium: El Molinón; Referee: Soriano Aladrén

7 September 1986 2	Valladolid	2–0	Real Sporting	Valladolid
	Peña 58'; Jorge Alonso 66'	Report		Stadium: José Zorrilla; Referee: Jiménez Muñoz

10 September 1986 3	Real Sporting	2–2	Real Madrid	Gijón
	Flores 1'; Mesa 35'; Ablanedo II (red card) 38'	Report	Valdano 20'; Hugo Sánchez 38' (pen.); Mino (yellow card) 0' (red card) 45'	Stadium: El Molinón; Referee: Andújar Oliver

14 September 1986 4	Español	0–0	Real Sporting	Barcelona
		Report		Stadium: Sarrià; Referee: Benavente Garasa

21 September 1986 5	Real Sporting	4–1	Murcia	Gijón
	Mesa 11', 89'; Jaime 33'; Joaquín 48'	Report	Timoumi 12'	Stadium: El Molinón; Referee: Bayarri Ribelles

27 September 1986 6	Las Palmas	3–4	Real Sporting	Las Palmas
	Saavedra 25'; Andrés 48'; Chinea 62'	Report	Mesa 3'; Flores 24', 31'; Marcelino 82'	Stadium: Insular; Referee: Crespo Aurre

5 October 1986 7	Atlético Madrid	1–0	Real Sporting	Madrid
	Julio Salinas 74'	Report		Stadium: Vicente Calderón; Referee: Merino González

8 October 1986 8	Real Sporting	1–0	Zaragoza	Gijón
	Flores 5'	Report		Stadium: El Molinón; Referee: Urío Velázquez

12 October 1986 9	Real Betis	1–0	Real Sporting	Seville
	Hadžibegić 73'	Report		Stadium: Benito Villamarín; Referee: Guruceta Muro

19 October 1986 10	Real Sporting	0–1	Real Sociedad	Gijón
		Report	Ablanedo II 64' (o.g.)	Stadium: El Molinón; Referee: Gómez Ramírez

26 October 1986 11	Osasuna	0–2	Real Sporting	Pamplona
		Report	Flores 3'; Tati (yellow card) 43' (red card); Joaquín 46'	Stadium: El Sadar; Referee: Martín Navarrete

2 November 1986 12	Real Sporting	0–0	Barcelona	Gijón
		Report		Stadium: El Molinón; Referee: Valdés Sánchez

8 November 1986 13	Racing Santander	1–2	Real Sporting	Santander
	Suárez 1'	Report	Joaquín 11'; Eloy 29'	Stadium: El Sardinero; Referee: Marín López

16 November 1986 14	Real Sporting	2–2	Mallorca	Gijón
	Esteban 2' (pen.); Flores 23' (pen.)	Report	Magdaleno 11'; Cundi 43' (o.g.)	Stadium: El Molinón; Referee: Pajares Paz

23 November 1986 15	Cádiz	2–0	Real Sporting	Cádiz
	Pedraza 66'; Cabrera 80'	Report		Stadium: Ramón de Carranza; Referee: Sánchez Moreno

7 December 1986 16	Real Sporting	2–1	Sabadell	Gijón
	Esteban 38' (pen.); Joaquín 64'	Report	Alonso 48'	Stadium: El Molinón; Referee: Guruceta Muro

14 December 1986 17	Sevilla	3–0	Real Sporting	Seville
	Choya 34'; Ramón 42', 87'	Report		Stadium: Ramón Sánchez Pizjuán; Referee: Pes Pérez

17 December 1986 18	Athletic Bilbao	0–0	Real Sporting	Bilbao
		Report		Stadium: San Mamés; Referee: Peraita Ibáñez

21 December 1986 19	Real Sporting	3–1	Valladolid	Gijón
	Villa 20'; Eloy 24'; Flores 43'	Report	Jorge Alonso 57'	Stadium: El Molinón; Referee: Benavente Garasa

28 December 1986 20	Real Madrid	2–2	Real Sporting	Madrid
	Hugo Sánchez 11'; Valdano 83'	Report	Eloy 25'; Ablanedo I 48'	Stadium: Santiago Bernabéu; Referee: Socorro González

3 January 1987 21	Real Sporting	0–1	Español	Gijón
		Report	Lauridsen 12'	Stadium: El Molinón; Referee: Taboada Soto

11 January 1987 22	Murcia	2–0	Real Sporting	Murcia
	Manolo 56'; Moyano 89'	Report	Esteban (red card) 85'	Stadium: La Condomina; Referee: Jiménez Muñoz

18 January 1987 23	Real Sporting	1–2	Las Palmas	Gijón
	Joaquín 35'	Report	Andrés 42', 78'	Stadium: El Molinón; Referee: Sánchez Molina Soto

25 January 1987 24	Real Sporting	1–1	Atlético Madrid	Gijón
	Joaquín 55'	Report	Julio Salinas 36'	Stadium: El Molinón; Referee: Crespo Aurre

1 February 1987 25	Zaragoza	1–1	Real Sporting	Zaragoza
	Blesa 8'	Report	Quini 80'	Stadium: La Romareda; Referee: Pérez Sánchez

8 February 1987 26	Real Sporting	3–0	Real Betis	Gijón
	Álex 25' (o.g.); Flores 35'; Eloy 49'	Report		Stadium: El Molinón; Referee: Miguel Pérez

14 February 1987 27	Real Sociedad	2–1	Real Sporting	San Sebastián
	Zamora 56' (pen.), 68'	Report	Marcelino 43'	Stadium: Atocha; Referee: Enríquez Negreira

22 February 1987 28	Real Sporting	3–0	Osasuna	Gijón
	Flores 62'; Mesa 65'; Jiménez 87'	Report		Stadium: El Molinón; Referee: Peraita Ibáñez

28 February 1987 29	Barcelona	0–4	Real Sporting	Barcelona
		Report	Flores 25'; Eloy 40', 59'; Luismi 72'	Stadium: Nou Camp; Referee: Martín Navarrete

8 March 1987 30	Real Sporting	2–1	Racing Santander	Gijón
	Joaquín 19' (pen.); Ablanedo I (red card) 40'; Eloy 71'	Report	Buckley 48'	Stadium: El Molinón; Referee: Caetano Bueno

14 March 1987 31	Mallorca	1–0	Real Sporting	Palma
	Luis García 70'	Report		Stadium: Lluís Sitjar; Referee: Soriano Aladren

22 March 1987 32	Real Sporting	2–1	Cádiz	Gijón
	Flores 47' (pen.), 58'	Report	Cabrera 25'; Cartagena (yellow card) 76' (red card)	Stadium: El Molinón; Referee: Urío Velázquez

25 March 1987 33	Sabadell	0–0	Real Sporting	Sabadell
		Report		Stadium: Nova Creu Alta; Referee: Andújar Oliver

5 April 1987 34	Real Sporting	3–1	Sevilla	Gijón
	Ablanedo I 36'; Mesa 39'; Joaquín 81' (pen.)	Report	Cholo 85' (pen.)	Stadium: El Molinón; Referee: Urizar Azpitarte

Second stage

12 April 1987 35	Español	2–1	Real Sporting	Barcelona
	Alonso 19'; Márquez 88'	Report	Mesa 12'	Stadium: Sarrià; Referee: Pérez Sánchez

18 April 1987 36	Real Sporting	0–1	Real Madrid	Gijón
		Report	Janković 75'	Stadium: El Molinón; Referee: Taboada Soto

3 May 1987 37	Real Sporting	1–1	Zaragoza	Gijón
	Negrete 26'	Report	Ablanedo II 10' (o.g.)	Stadium: El Molinón; Referee: Sánchez Arminio

9 May 1987 38	Barcelona	2–0	Real Sporting	Barcelona
	Roberto 3'; Archibald 38'	Report		Stadium: Nou Camp; Referee: García de Loza

17 May 1987 39	Real Sporting	1–1	Mallorca	Gijón
	Ablanedo I 38' (o.g.)	Report	Magdaleno 53'	Stadium: El Molinón; Referee: Sánchez Moreno

24 May 1987 40	Real Sporting	4–0	Español	Gijón
	Eloy 30', 47', 76'; Villa 70' (yellow card) 80' (red card)	Report		Stadium: El Molinón; Referee: Jiménez Muñoz

30 May 1987 41	Real Madrid	4–0	Real Sporting	Madrid
	Hugo Sánchez 1', 15', 34'; Martín Vázquez 60'	Report		Stadium: Santiago Bernabéu; Referee: Urío Velázquez

7 June 1987 42	Zaragoza	2–2	Real Sporting	Zaragoza
	Señor 35'; García Cortés 39'	Report	Zurdi 45'; Ablanedo I 75'	Stadium: La Romareda; Referee: Taboada Soto

14 June 1987 43	Real Sporting	1–0	Barcelona	Gijón
	Zurdi 63'	Report		Stadium: El Molinón; Referee: Soriano Aladrén

21 June 1987 42	Mallorca	1–1	Real Sporting	Palma
	Nadal 61'	Report	Eloy 60'	Stadium: Lluís Sitjar; Referee: Mazorra Freire

=== Copa del Rey ===
==== Matches ====
17 September 1986 First round	Avilés	0–4	Real Sporting	Avilés
		Report	Ablanedo I 46'; Flores 53', 80'; Quini 83'	Stadium: Román Suárez Puerta; Referee: Urizar Azpitarte

1 October 1986 Second round	Real Sporting	1–1 (1–3 p)	Racing Santander	Gijón
	Flores 63' (pen.)	Report	Chiri 18'	Stadium: El Molinón; Referee: García de Loza

== Squad statistics ==
=== Appearances and goals ===
No.	Pos	Nat	Player	Total		La Liga	
No.	Pos	Nat	Player	Apps	Goals	Apps	Goals
	GK	(Spain) ESP	Ablanedo II	42	0	42+0	0
	GK	(Spain) ESP	Pedro Rodríguez	3	0	2+1	0
	GK	(Spain) ESP	Isidro Fernández	0	0	0+0	0
	DF	(Spain) ESP	Fernando Tocornal	0	0	0+0	0
	DF	(Spain) ESP	Nicolás Pereda	0	0	0+0	0
	DF	(Spain) ESP	Ablanedo I	43	4	43+0	4
	DF	(Spain) ESP	Tomás Orbegozo	0	0	0+0	0
	DF	(Spain) ESP	Manolo Jiménez	43	1	43+0	1
	DF	(Spain) ESP	Cundi	41	0	40+1	0
	DF	(Spain) ESP	Esteban	40	2	40+0	2
	DF	(Spain) ESP	Tati	35	0	29+6	0
	DF	(Spain) ESP	José Manuel Espinosa	19	0	17+2	0
	DF	(Spain) ESP	Roberto	0	0	0+0	0
	MF	(Spain) ESP	Manuel Mesa	43	7	43+0	7
	MF	(Spain) ESP	Joaquín	40	8	39+1	8
	MF	(Spain) ESP	Jaime	34	1	30+4	1
	MF	(Spain) ESP	Iñaki Eraña	0	0	0+0	0
	MF	(Spain) ESP	Marcelino	33	2	16+17	2
	MF	(Spain) ESP	Emilio	9	0	4+5	0
	MF	(Spain) ESP	Juanma	5	0	1+4	0
	MF	(Mexico) MEX	Manuel Negrete	4	1	2+2	1
	MF	(Spain) ESP	Tino	0	0	0+0	0
	FW	(Mexico) MEX	Luis Flores	31	12	30+1	12
	FW	(Spain) ESP	Eloy	43	11	41+2	11
	FW	(Spain) ESP	Quini	16	1	1+15	1
	FW	(Spain) ESP	Luismi	8	1	4+4	1
	MF	(Spain) ESP	Zurdi	7	2	3+4	2
	FW	(Spain) ESP	Joaquín Villa	29	4	14+15	4
