= List of Sporting de Gijón players =

This is the list of notable footballers who have played for Sporting de Gijón. Generally, this means players that have played 100 or more league matches for the club. However, some players who have played fewer matches are also included; this includes first nationals at the club, and some players who fell short of the 100 total but made significant contributions to the club's history or in his career.

Appearances and goals include La Liga, Segunda División and playoffs matches. Substitute appearances are included. Statistics are correct as of the end of the 2015–16 season.

== Key ==
| **Name in bold** | Currently playing at Sporting |
| | Played their entire career at Sporting |

== Players ==
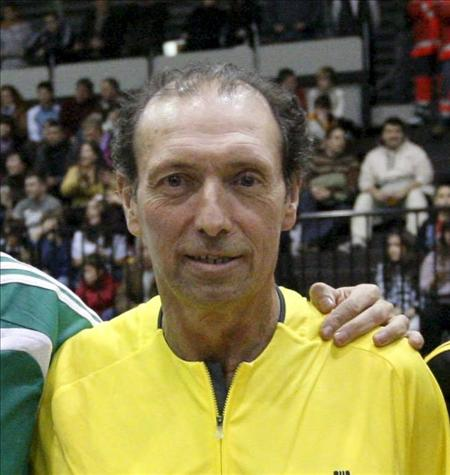
Quini is the top goalscorer with the club

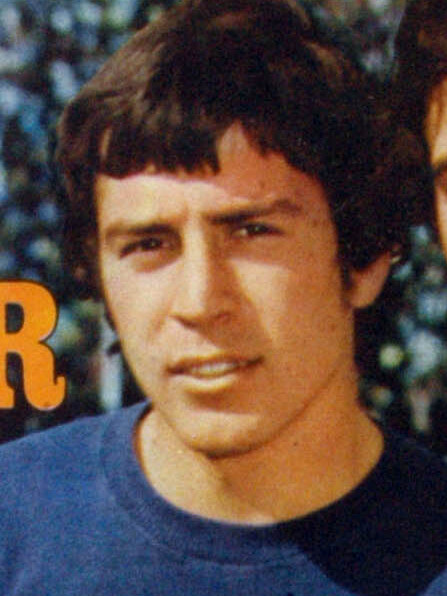
Enzo Ferrero, the club's best foreign player

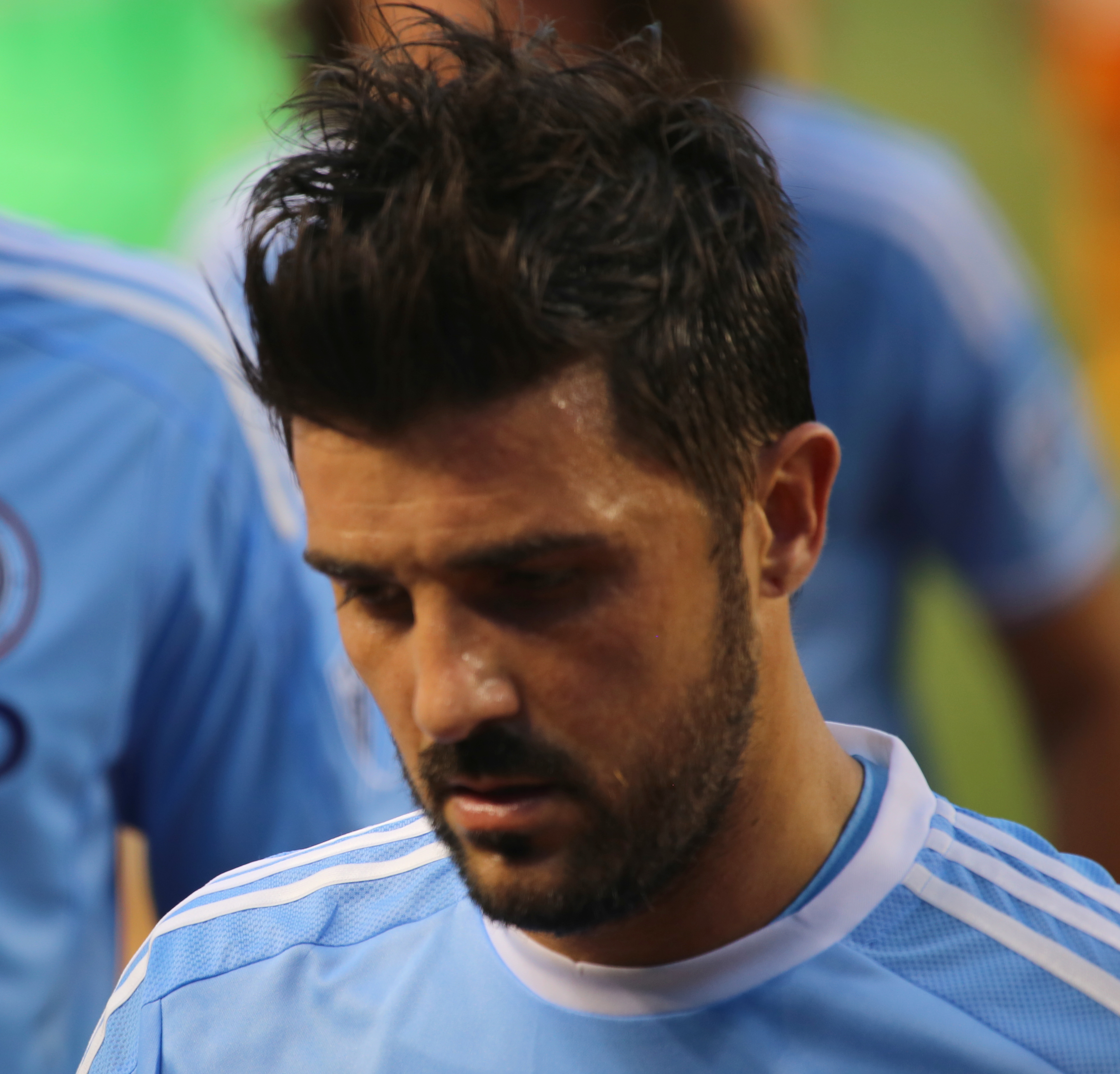
David Villa debuted as a professional player in Sporting Gijón

Asturian flag is added for Spanish players born in Asturias.

| Name | Nat. | Pos. | Sporting career | Apps | Goals | NT Apps | NT Goals |
|---|---|---|---|---|---|---|---|
| Joaquín | (Asturias) | MF | 1976–1992 | 514 | 67 | 18 | 1 |
| Quini | (Asturias) | FW | 1968–1980; 1984–1987 | 441 | 227 | 35 | 8 |
| Manuel Jiménez | (Spain) | DF | 1979–1991 | 420 | 8 | 1 | 0 |
| Jesús Castro | (Asturias) | GK | 1967–1984 | 417 | 0 | | |
| Ablanedo II | (Asturias) | GK | 1982–1999 | 401 | 0 | 4 | 0 |
| Manuel Mesa | (Spain) | MF | 1975–1987 | 339 | 36 | 2 | 1 |
| Armando Medina | (Asturias) | MF | 1951–1966 | 321 | 22 | | |
| Pepe Ortiz | (Asturias) | FW | 1949–1963 | 321 | 131 | | |
| Tati Valdés | (Asturias) | MF | 1965–1979 | 316 | 40 | | |
| Cundi | (Asturias) | DF | 1974–1976; 1977–1989 | 310 | 9 | 9 | 0 |
| Rafel Sastre | (Spain) | DF | 2001–2011 | 309 | 4 | | |
| Tamayo | (Asturias) | DF | 1940–1955 | 306 | 3 | | |
| Ciriaco Cano | (Spain) | MF | 1971–1983 | 301 | 29 | | |
| Roberto Canella | (Asturias) | DF | 2006–2014; 2015–2019 | 306 | 8 | | |
| Francisco Sánchez | (Asturias) | FW | 1945–1959 | 286 | 61 | | |
| Molinucu | (Asturias) | MF | 1944–1957 | 285 | 28 | | |
| José Antonio Redondo | (Asturias) | DF | 1972–1985 | 278 | 3 | | |
| Ignacio Churruca | (Spain) | FW | 1967–1976 | 274 | 51 | 16 | 0 |
| Enzo Ferrero | (Argentina) | FW | 1975–1985 | 273 | 65 | 3 | 1 |
| José Manuel | (Asturias) | MF | 1968–1978 | 270 | 7 | | |
| **Carlos Carmona** | (Spain) | MF | 2012– | 260 | 43 | | |
| Alberto Lora | (Spain) | DF | 2007–2018 | 256 | 5 | | |
| Cholo Dindurra | (Asturias) | FW | 1941–1942; 1943–1953 | 246 | 65 | | |
| Sión | (Asturias) | GK | 1949–1960 | 240 | 0 | | |
| Rogelio Altisent | (Spain) | DF | 1952–1962 | 235 | 0 | | |
| Eloy | (Asturias) | FW | 1982–1988; 1995–1996 | 227 | 39 | 15 | 4 |
| Antonio Puente | (Spain) | DF | 1962–1973 | 227 | 13 | | |
| Miguel Ángel Montes | (Asturias) | MF | 1959–1961; 1962–1969 | 224 | 60 | | |
| Pablo | (Spain) | DF | 1990–1998 | 216 | 4 | | |
| Antonio Maceda | (Spain) | DF | 1976–1985 | 212 | 20 | 36 | 8 |
| Igor Lediakhov | (Russia) | MF | 1994–1998; 1998–2002 | 211 | 43 | 16 | 1 |
| Rafael Biempica | (Asturias) | FW | 1955–1964 | 210 | 55 | | |
| Miguel Alonso | (Asturias) | DF | 1962–1974 | 210 | 1 | | |
| Juan | (Asturias) | MF | 2001–2006 | 202 | 9 | | |
| David Barral | (Spain) | FW | 2006–2012 | 201 | 48 | | |
| Mate Bilić | (Croatia) | FW | 2003–2004; 2008–2013 | 201 | 57 | 7 | 3 |
| Iván Cuéllar | (Spain) | GK | 2008–2017 | 201 | 0 | | |
| Abel | (Spain) | FW | 1976–1984 | 198 | 41 | | |
| Roberto | (Spain) | GK | 2002–2008 | 197 | 0 | | |
| Pocholo | (Asturias) | FW | 1960–1968 | 195 | 74 | | |
| Juan Eraña | (Spain) | MF | 1962–1970 | 184 | 22 | | |
| Sergio Álvarez | (Asturias) | MF | 2009–2012; 2013–2018 | 180 | 11 | | |
| Abelardo | (Asturias) | DF | 1989–1994 | 179 | 13 | 54 | 3 |
| Nacho Cases | (Asturias) | MF | 2010–2017 | 178 | 10 | | |
| Ablanedo I | (Asturias) | DF | 1983–1994; 1985–1994 | 174 | 7 | | |
| José Prendes | (Asturias) | MF | 1948–1957 | 172 | 88 | | |
| Francisco Javier Uría | (Asturias) | DF | 1977–1983 | 172 | 7 | 14 | 0 |
| Víctor Doria | (Argentina) | DF | 1973–1983 | 170 | 14 | | |
| Diego Castro | (Spain) | FW | 2006–2011 | 170 | 39 | | |
| Esteban | (Asturias) | DF | 1982–1988 | 168 | 8 | | |
| Jesús Uribe | (Spain) | DF | 1963–1969 | 167 | 0 | | |
| Manuel Cervigón | (Spain) | MF | 1940–1951 | 166 | 12 | | |
| Tomás | (Spain) | MF | 1991–1998 | 161 | 13 | | |
| David Cano | (Asturias) | MF | 1994–2001 | 161 | 10 | | |
| Pablo Álvarez | (Asturias) | MF | 2001–2006 | 161 | 26 | | |
| Tati | (Asturias) | DF | 1986–1993 | 160 | 0 | | |
| Dmitri Cheryshev | (Russia) | FW | 1996–2001 | 158 | 47 | 13 | 1 |
| Luis Sierra | (Spain) | DF | 1987–1994 | 155 | 2 | | |
| Iván Hernández | (Spain) | DF | 2007–2015 | 155 | 1 | | |
| Muñiz | (Asturias) | DF | 1991–1996 | 152 | 6 | | |
| Pin | (Asturias) | MF | 1928–1936; 1939–1943 | 151 | 64 | | |
| José Manuel Espinosa | (Spain) | DF | 1982–1988 | 148 | 2 | | |
| Mario Cotelo | (Asturias) | MF | 1993–1994; 1998–2001 | 148 | 10 | | |
| **Javi Fuego** | (Asturias) | MF | 2001–2007; 2019– | 148 | 4 | | |
| Enrique Cabal | (Asturias) | DF | 1949–1958 | 146 | 2 | | |
| Javier Dorado | (Spain) | DF | 2001–2002; 2003–2006 | 146 | 2 | | |
| Germán | (Asturias) | MF | 1948–1956 | 145 | 8 | | |
| Anastasio Calleja | (Spain) | MF | 1933–1936; 1939–1946 | 144 | 12 | | |
| Manuel Echevarría | (Asturias) | DF | 1965–1973 | 143 | 0 | | |
| Alfonso Fanjul | (Spain) | MF | 1970–1978 | 143 | 14 | | |
| Dani Borreguero | (Spain) | MF | 2001–2005 | 143 | 13 | | |
| Fabián | (Spain) | DF | 1970–1976 | 141 | 1 | | |
| Míchel | (Asturias) | MF | 2005–2010 | 138 | 7 | | |
| Florín | (Asturias) | DF | 1962–1970 | 138 | 1 | | |
| Luis Hernández | (Spain) | DF | 2012–2016 | 135 | 1 | | |
| Herrero II | (Asturias) | MF | 1967–1976 | 134 | 15 | | |
| Antonio Amengual | (Spain) | FW | 1962–1968 | 133 | 23 | | |
| Joaquín Villa | (Asturias) | FW | 1983–1985; 1986–1990 | 133 | 27 | | |
| **Pablo Pérez** | (Asturias) | MF | 2014–2016; 2018– | 132 | 10 | | |
| Isma López | (Spain) | MF | 2013–2018 | 131 | 8 | | |
| Óscar | (Asturias) | MF | 1988–1994 | 129 | 10 | | |
| Alfredo Pascual | (Spain) | DF | 1970–1975 | 125 | 3 | | |
| **Diego Mariño** | (Spain) | GK | 2016– | 123 | 0 | | |
| Pío | (Asturias) | FW | 1944–1950; 1954–1955 | 122 | 74 | | |
| Emilio | (Asturias) | MF | 1982–1983; 1984–1991 | 122 | 12 | | |
| Miguel de las Cuevas | (Spain) | MF | 2009–2013 | 121 | 18 | | |
| Sión III | (Asturias) | DF | 1941–1948 | 120 | 2 | | |
| Juan Pablo | (Spain) | GK | 2009–2013 | 120 | 0 | | |
| Bernardo | (Colombia) | DF | 2013–2017 | 119 | 8 | | |
| Herrero I | (Spain) | MF | 1967–1973 | 118 | 2 | | |
| Juan José Valencia | (Spain) | GK | 1999–2004 | 118 | 0 | | |
| Juanma | (Asturias) | MF | 1986–1992 | 116 | 9 | | |
| Jorge | (Asturias) | DF | 2005–2009 | 116 | 5 | | |
| Alfredo Ladreda | (Asturias) | DF | 1946–1955 | 115 | 2 | | |
| Javier Manjarín | (Asturias) | FW | 1989–1993 | 115 | 16 | 13 | 2 |
| Cástulo | (Spain) | DF | 1947–1953 | 114 | 2 | | |
| Alberto | (Asturias) | MF | 1962–1968 | 112 | 17 | | |
| Ángel Luis Alcázar | (Spain) | DF | 1989–1993 | 112 | 2 | | |
| Zurdi | (Asturias) | FW | 1982–1988 | 110 | 5 | | |
| Arturo | (Asturias) | DF | 1987–1988; 1989–1994 | 110 | 1 | | |
| Raúl Lozano | (Spain) | MF | 1999–2003 | 109 | 12 | | |
| Gerardo | (Asturias) | MF | 2001–2007 | 108 | 9 | | |
| Alfredo Megido | (Spain) | FW | 1971–1975 | 107 | 19 | 1 | 1 |
| Jaime | (Asturias) | MF | 1985–1990 | 105 | 2 | | |
| Luis Morán | (Asturias) | FW | 2006–2012 | 105 | 12 | | |
| Jony | (Spain) | MF | 2014–2016; 2018 | 105 | 20 | | |
| Francisco Solabarrieta | (Spain) | FW | 1963–1969 | 104 | 72 | | |
| Rubén Suárez | (Asturias) | FW | 1998–2004 | 104 | 11 | | |
| Isma | (Asturias) | DF | 1998–2005 | 102 | 4 | | |
| Perico Pena | (Asturias) | DF | 1928–1934; 1939–1940 | 101 | 1 | | |
| Jesús Enrique Velasco | (Spain) | DF | 1994–1998 | 100 | 4 | | |
| Juanele | (Asturias) | FW | 1991–1994 | 91 | 18 | 5 | 2 |
| David Villa | (Asturias) | FW | 2001–2003 | 80 | 38 | 98 | 59 |
| Paco Campos | (Spain) | FW | 1948–1952 | 82 | 65 | | |
| Georgi Yordanov | (Bulgaria) | FW | 1990–1993 | 77 | 7 | 40 | 3 |
| Marcel Sabou | (Romania) | MF | 1993–1996 | 72 | 6 | | |
| Milan Luhový | (Slovakia) | MF | 1989–1992 | 56 | 23 | 31 | 7 |
| Ramón Herrera | (Asturias) | FW | 1930–1935 | 54 | 62 | | |
| Julio Salinas | (Spain) | FW | 1995–1996 | 54 | 24 | 56 | 22 |
| Joakim Nilsson | (Sweden) | MF | 1990–1993 | 49 | 0 | 27 | 1 |
| Sebastián Eguren | (Uruguay) | MF | 2010–2012 | 49 | 3 | 54 | 7 |
| Stefan Šćepović | (Serbia) | FW | 2013–2014 | 41 | 23 | 8 | 1 |
| Luis Enrique | (Asturias) | MF | 1989–1991 | 36 | 14 | 62 | 12 |
| Ricardo Alós | (Spain) | FW | 1956–1957 | 34 | 46 | | |
