= Wilmar Cabrera =

Uruguayan footballer (born 1959)

Personal information
- Full name: Wilmar Rubens Cabrera Sappa
- Date of birth: 31 July 1959 (age 67)
- Place of birth: Cerrillos, Uruguay
- Height: 1.82 m (6 ft 0 in)
- Position: Striker

Senior career*
Years	Team	Apps	(Gls)
1977–1983	Nacional	62	(27)
1983–1984	Millonarios		
1984–1986	Valencia	54	(22)
1986–1987	Nice	27	(7)
1987–1988	Sporting de Gijón	22	(2)
1988–1989	Deportivo Mandiyú	37	(7)
1989–1990	Necaxa	38	(8)
1991–1992	Nacional	36	(3)
1993–1994	Huracán Buceo		
1995	Rampla Juniors		
1995–1996	River Plate Montevideo		

International career
1983–1986	Uruguay	26	(6)
Medal record
Representing Uruguay
Copa América
Winner	1983
CONMEBOL–UEFA Cup of Champions
Runner-up	1985 France
- * Club domestic league appearances and goals

Wilmar Rubens Cabrera Sappa (born 31 July 1959) is a Uruguayan former football striker, who was nicknamed "Toro". He obtained 26 caps for his national team, scoring six goals. Having made his debut on 2 June 1983, in a match against Paraguay (0–0) in Asunción.

He played club football for Nacional, Millonarios of Colombia, Valencia and Real Valladolid from Spain. Necaxa from Mexico and Nice in France.

Later in his career he returned to Uruguay where he played for Huracán Buceo, Rampla Juniors and River Plate Montevideo.
