= Felipe Miñambres =

Spanish footballer (born 1965)

Personal information
- Full name: Felipe Miñambres Fernández
- Date of birth: 29 April 1965 (age 61)
- Place of birth: Astorga, Spain
- Height: 1.74 m (5 ft 9 in)
- Position: Attacking midfielder

Team information
- Current team: Tenerife (president)

Youth career
- 1980–1983: Atlético Astorga

Senior career*
Years	Team	Apps	(Gls)
1983–1984	Atlético Astorga		
1984–1986	Zamora	69	(24)
1986–1988	Sporting Gijón B	57	(38)
1988–1989	Sporting Gijón	38	(9)
1989–1999	Tenerife	310	(33)
Total		474	(104)

International career
1989–1994	Spain	6	(2)

Managerial career
- 1999: Tenerife
- 2002–2003: Hércules
- 2003–2005: Salamanca
- 2006: Alicante
- 2006–2007: Lleida
- 2010: Rayo Vallecano
- 2022: Levante (interim)
- 2024: Levante
- * Club domestic league appearances and goals

Felipe Miñambres Fernández (born 29 April 1965) is a Spanish former professional footballer who played as an attacking midfielder. He is the president of Segunda División club Tenerife.

He spent 12 seasons in La Liga, with Sporting de Gijón (two years) and Tenerife (ten), amassing totals of 348 games and 42 goals. He represented Spain at the 1994 World Cup.

Miñambres worked with several clubs as a manager since 1999, being in charge of Tenerife, Salamanca, Rayo Vallecano and Levante in the Segunda División.

== Club career ==
A product of Sporting de Gijón's famed youth system, Mareo, Miñambres was born in Astorga, Province of León, and made his debut with the first team during 1987–88, being an undisputed starter the following season when he scored a career-best nine goals in La Liga.

For the 1989–90 campaign, Miñambres signed with CD Tenerife, going on to be active part of the club's top-flight consolidation and subsequent UEFA Cup participations. As the Canary Islands side were relegated in 1999, he retired from football at the age of 34 and went into management.

== International career ==
Over four and a half years, Miñambres won six caps for Spain and scored two goals. His debut came on 13 December 1989 in a 2–1 friendly victory over Switzerland, and he netted the last in the 59th minute of a match played in Santa Cruz de Tenerife.

Miñambres was subsequently part of Spain's squad at the 1994 FIFA World Cup, appearing against South Korea and Bolivia.

== Managerial career ==
Miñambres started coaching former team Tenerife (being one of four managers during 1999–2000 in the Segunda División), then continued with Hércules CF, UD Salamanca, Alicante CF and UE Lleida. In the 2007–08 season, he became Rayo Vallecano's director of football.

On 15 February 2010, with the Madrid club now in the second tier but immerse in a sporting crisis, Miñambres replaced the dismissed Pepe Mel as coach. In June, after helping them to retain their league status, he returned to the office.

Having left the Campo de Fútbol de Vallecas in 2016, Miñambres was employed in the same capacity at RC Celta de Vigo. On 11 February 2022, he moved to Levante UD also as a director of football, but was also in charge of the team for two matches in October after relieving Mehdi Nafti of his duties.

Miñambres returned to the bench at the Estadi Ciutat de València on 19 February 2024, now in place of the sacked Javier Calleja, for the remainder of the season. Back to his previous role in June, he left Levante on 26 February 2025 after allegedly taking a "wage cut" through WhatsApp.

On 3 June 2025, Miñambres was named president of Tenerife. Two months earlier, he had returned to the club as counselor.

== Managerial statistics ==
As of 2 June 2024

Managerial record by team and tenure
Team	Nat	From	To	Record								Ref
Team	Nat	From	To	G	W	D	L	GF	GA	GD	Win %	Ref
Tenerife	(Spain)	3 October 1999	10 October 1999	1	0	1	0	1	1	+0	0.00	
Hércules	(Spain)	25 March 2002	17 March 2003	46	16	18	12	53	41	+12	34.78	
Salamanca	(Spain)	1 July 2003	6 March 2005	72	19	26	27	86	90	−4	26.39	
Alicante	(Spain)	13 February 2006	30 June 2006	19	9	8	2	27	12	+15	47.37	
Lleida	(Spain)	1 July 2006	31 January 2007	23	8	10	5	25	17	+8	34.78	
Rayo Vallecano	(Spain)	15 February 2010	20 June 2010	18	6	4	8	31	26	+5	33.33	
Levante (interim)	(Spain)	10 October 2022	16 October 2022	2	2	0	0	3	1	+2	100.00	
Levante	(Spain)	19 February 2024	2 June 2024	15	4	8	3	17	14	+3	26.67	
Total				196	64	75	57	243	202	+41	32.65	—
