= Pepe Ortiz =

Spanish footballer

Personal information
- Full name: José Luis Ortiz Peláez
- Date of birth: 19 March 1931
- Place of birth: Gijón, Spain
- Date of death: 17 January 2001 (aged 69)
- Place of death: Gijón, Spain
- Position: Striker

Youth career
- Pelayo

Senior career*
Years	Team	Apps	(Gls)
1949–1963	Real Gijón	321	(131)
- * Club domestic league appearances and goals

José Luis Ortiz Peláez (19 March 1931 – 17 January 2001), more commonly known as Pepe Ortiz, was a Spanish professional footballer who played his entire career for Real Gijón as a right winger or attacking midfielder.

== Club career ==
Born in Gijón, Asturias, Ortiz firstly played in several teams of the city before joining Sporting de Gijón, in that years named as Real Gijón, in 1949 at the age of 18. He played is entire career with the rojiblancos achieving two promotions to the top tier in 1951 and 1957.

Ortiz became famous in 1961 when Real Gijón, after the end of the 1960–61 Segunda División was relegated to the third division after losing the relegation playoffs against Burgos. Weeks later, the resignation of Condal to continue playing in the second tier allowed Sporting to play a repechage playoff against Sevilla Atlético and Castellón. In the first match, Sporting tied 3–3 against Castellón. The winner of the match would be decided by a coin toss. After winning the two previous coin tosses during the match, choosing tails in both, captain Pepe Ortiz decided to choose again tails, and Sporting became the winner of the game, thus avoiding the relegation of the club for the first time ever.

After his retirement, Ortiz continued vinculated to Sporting Gijón, acting as delegate until 1995, when he retires.

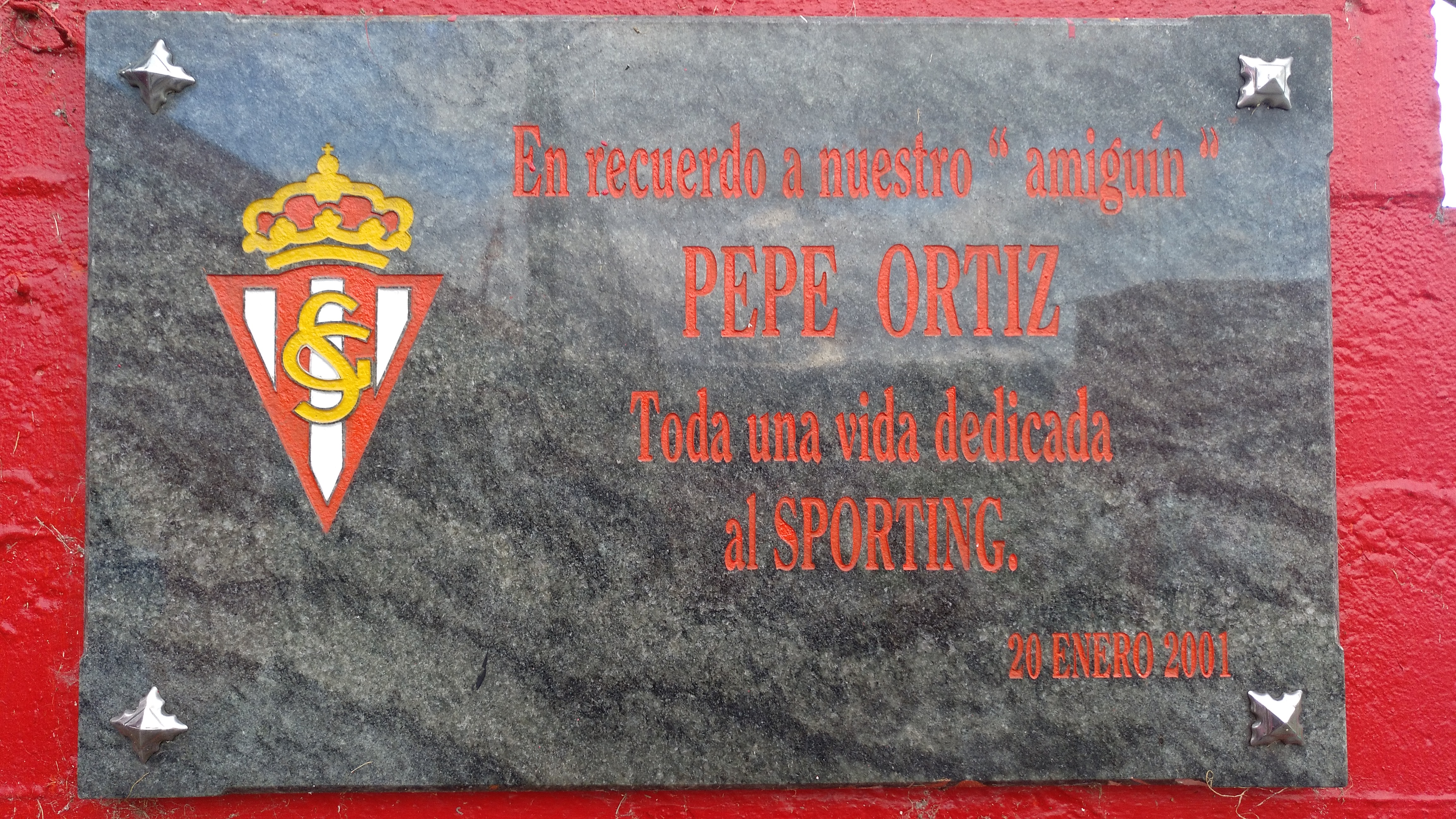
Commemorative plaque at the Escuela de Fútbol de Mareo.

On 17 January 2001, Ortiz died. Three days later after his death, the main pitch of the Escuela de Fútbol de Mareo, the club's academy, was renamed to pay tribute to him and also a street was named as him in Ceares, his home neighbourhood. UC Ceares named their summer trophy Memorial Pepe Ortiz, considering him the best footballer in the history of the neighbourhood.

== See also ==
- List of one-club men in association football
