= Enrique Ayúcar =

Spanish footballer

Personal information
- Full name: Enrique Ayúcar Alberdi
- Date of birth: 21 February 1966 (age 60)
- Place of birth: Bilbao, Spain
- Height: 1.73 m (5 ft 8 in)
- Position: Midfielder

Youth career
- –1983: Athletic Bilbao

Senior career*
| Years | Team | Apps | (Gls) |
| 1983–1986 | Bilbao Athletic | 68 | (4) |
| 1986–1989 | Athletic Bilbao | 29 | (1) |
| 1989–1990 | Castellón | 34 | (3) |
| 1990–1992 | Real Burgos | 72 | (11) |
| 1992–1995 | Español | 43 | (3) |
| 1995–1996 | Salamanca | 5 | (1) |
| Total | | 251 | (23) |

International career
| 1986 | Spain Under-21 | 2 | (0) |
- * Club domestic league appearances and goals

Enrique Ayúcar Alberdi (born 21 February 1966) is a Spanish former professional footballer who played as a midfielder. He played in La Liga for Athletic Bilbao, Castellón, Real Burgos, Español and Salamanca, making a total of 162 top flight appearances.

== Club career ==
Born in Bilbao, Biscay, Basque Country, Ayúcar started his career with the famous Lezama youth programme of Athletic Bilbao. He joined the club's B team, Bilbao Athletic, in 1983, and was an important part of the Segunda División side until being promoted to the first team during the 1986–87 La Liga season.

His first season with the Athletic first team was also his best, making 22 league appearances, as well as playing in a 2–1 win over Belgian side Beveren in the second leg of their UEFA Cup second round tie at San Mamés. This victory was not enough to overturn a 3–1 deficit from the first leg, and Bilbao exited the competition 4–3 on aggregate.

Ayúcar's opportunities were much more limited over the next two seasons, and he departed after a 1988–89 season in which he didn't play in the league at all. He joined newly promoted Castellón, being a key part of the side during the 1989–90 season, in which he played 34 matches and contributed three goals. He moved on again ahead of the 1990–91 season, joining Real Burgos.

During two seasons at El Plantío, Ayúcar was a regular starter in midfield, and formed strong partnerships with players such as Ivica Barbarić. He made 72 league appearances for Burgos, scoring eleven goals, before moving on to Español ahead of the 1992–93 season. The club were relegated at the end of that season, but Ayúcar was a key part of the team that secured promotion at the first attempt as champions the following year.

Back in the top flight, opportunities were limited for Ayúcar, who played only four matches in 1994–95. He spent the following year with relegation-bound Salamanca, making five appearances and scoring the 19th and final top flight goal of his career. He came off the bench with six minutes to go in the away fixture against Rayo Vallecano at Estadio Teresa Rivero on 8 October, and scored the final goal in a 4–1 victory three minutes from time. He retired in 1996 at the age of 30.

== International career ==
Ayúcar made two appearances for the Spain under-21 side during qualification for the 1988 UEFA European Under-21 Championship. His debut came on 12 November 1986, in a 1–0 home win over Romania in Córdoba, where he played for the first hour before being replaced by Marcelino. On 2 December 1986, he also played in a 0–0 draw with Albania at the Tomori Stadium.

== Honours ==
Español

- Segunda División: 1993–94
