= Carlos Arroyo (footballer, born 1966) =

Spanish footballer (born 1966)

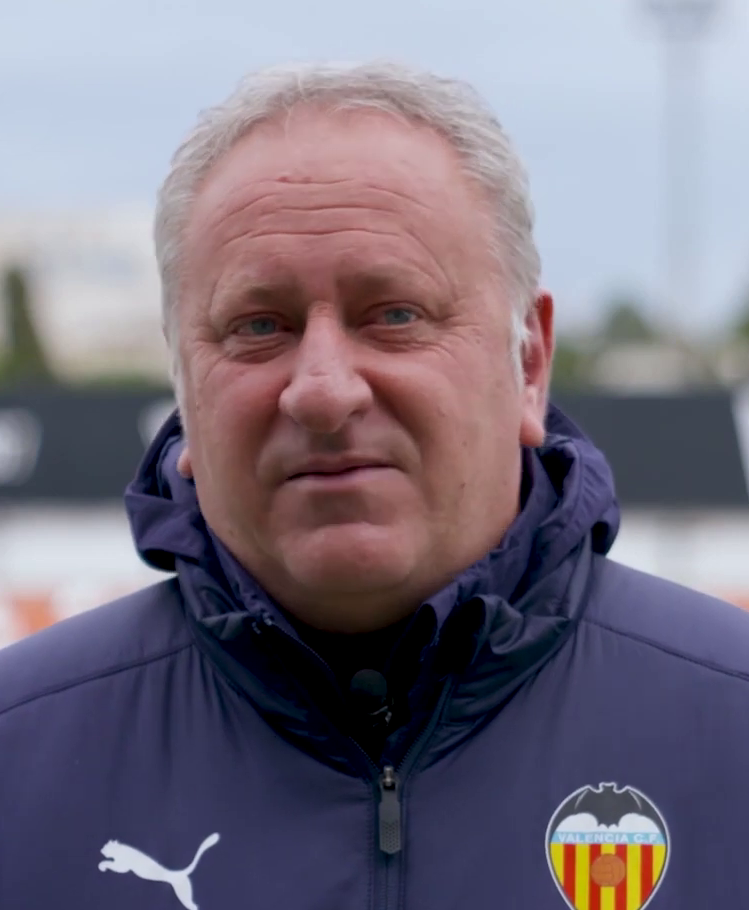
- Carlos Arroyo in 2021

Personal information
- Full name: Carlos Arroyo Ayala
- Date of birth: 16 February 1966
- Place of birth: Alcorcón, Madrid, Spain
- Height: 1.78 m (5 ft 10 in)
- Position: Midfielder

Youth career
- AD Alcorcón
- CE Mestalla

Senior career*
Years	Team	Apps	(Gls)
1984–1996	Valencia CF	272	(34)
1996–1998	Villarreal CF	40	(0)
Total		312	(34)
- * Club domestic league appearances and goals

Carlos Arroyo Ayala (16 February 1966) is a retired Spanish footballer who played as a midfielder for Valencia CF and Villarreal CF. He was known as the Prince of Alcorcón. With a total of 373 matches with Valencia, he is the club's 10th most-capped player in history.

== Playing career ==
=== Early career ===
Carlos Arroyo was born on 16 February 1966 in Alcorcón, and he took his first steps in football in the youth ranks of his hometown club AD Alcorcón, a regional team from Madrid, a club in which he joined at the age of 12 with the help of his brother Tomás. His progression was meteoric, and in a short time he became the best player in the youth team and one of the most promising midfielders in Madrid regional football, popularly known as "The Prince of Alcorcón". At the age of 15 he was already training with the first team and at the age of 17, he made his senior debut in a Tercera División match against Carabanchel. The website of this club states that Arroyo is "the best player that the AD Alcorcón youth team has produced".

=== Valencia CF ===
His good play attracted the attention of the Valencian representatives, Enrique Buqué and Manolo Mestre, who incorporated him into the Valencian affiliate, CE Mestalla. Arroyo made his preseason debut in a friendly match against UE Lleida on 1 August 1984, but due to his youth he began the season with Mestalla. He had the opportunity to make his debut with the first team in the First Division due to the strike of professional footballers on 9 September, against RDC Espanyol at the Mestalla Stadium.

After that atypical match, Arroyo returned to the reserve team to continue playing in the Third Division under coach Óscar Rubén Valdez and did not defend the first team's colors again until matchday 21, against Real Betis, in which he scored "an exceptional goal" to help his side to a 3–1 win. The then Valencia coach Roberto Gil then decided to promote him to the first team permanently, appearing in the Valencia CF lineups for the following 12 seasons, becoming the seventh player with the most games played in the First Division (276) when he left in 1996. He was a starter with great regularity, but he was also the preferred replacement for several successive coaches, being the player who played the most games as a substitute with 97 (a record later equaled by Miguel Ángel Angulo), and the one who was substituted the most times in the League (63 games). His last goal as a Valencian player against Espanyol in Mestalla on 19 May 1996 could have been the most important of his entire career, as it brought the team closer to the League title that finally escaped in favor of Atlético Madrid on the last day. This was the third time that he was on the verge of winning a title, as he was runner-up in the Copa del Rey in 1995 and runner-up in the League in 1989–90 and 1995–96. During his stay at Mestalla he received offers to play abroad, but as he stated once he retired, "I didn't even want to listen to them".

=== Later career ===
In 1996, the 30-year-old Arroyo was allowed to leave by Luis Aragonés, and although he had the strength and quality to reinforce top-level teams, he had become a Valencian and preferred to stay close to home, accepting an offer from Villarreal for two seasons in the Second Division. He spent the first year almost blank due to injuries, playing only 11 League games, but in the second he completed 29 games, contributing to its historic promotion to First Division. In the summer of 1998, the arrival of David Albelda meant the end of Arroyo's predominant role in the team. At Villarreal, Arroyo reinforced his reputation as a substitute because out of 40 games played, he only started 3.

Arroyo went to Sagunto to defend the CD Acero shirt for two and a half years, but pain in his lower back forced him to retire permanently.

Arroyo stayed at Valencia CF, training the youth players in the lower categories. He worked as a delegate of the Valencian subsidiary, CE Mestella.

== International career ==
In the 1984–85 season, Arroyo was included in the Spanish under-21 team.

== Playing style and status ==
During the twelve seasons he was at Valencia, including its sting in the Segunda División, Arroyo showed his technical skills and vision of the game. Skills like dribbling, game distribution and verticality that has been accompanied by him. He scored goals very regularly, scoring a total of 65 goals in 469 games with Valencia, and made mostly low shots, arrivals at the small area, headers and volleys on rejections. One recorded penalty was against Real Betis in 1990.

His professionalism and dedication to Valencia both on and off the field made him one of the team's leaders in a difficult time that included a complicated relegation to the Second Division and a subsequent reconstruction of the team, in which he actively collaborated, to return to take the club to Europe and fight for national titles.

== Honours ==
Valencia CF

Segunda División:

- Winners (1) 1986–87
