= Pepeo Calleja =

Spanish footballer

José Díez Calleja (born 25 September 1962), also known as Pepeo, is a Spanish retired footballer who played as a defender.

During his nine-year professional career, he played mainly for Betis, appearing in 161 official games over the course of six seasons (seven goals).

== Career ==
Born in Ortuella, Biscay, Calleja arrived at Real Betis in the 1983 summer from local Sestao Sport Club, playing in only three La Liga games in his first season, but subsequently becoming an important first-team unit with the Andalusians. He made his league debut on 11 September 1983, playing 19 minutes in a 4–1 home win against RCD Español, and also featured in both games against FC Universitatea Craiova in the 1984–85 UEFA Cup (as a substitute), in an eventual first round penalty shootout exit.

After Betis' relegation in 1989, Calleja joined fellow league outfit Sporting de Gijón, but appeared rarely over the course of his only season, moving to the second division with UD Salamanca, and suffering another relegation. He closed out his professional career in June 1992 at the age of 29 due to injuries, after one top flight season with CD Logroñés.
