= Iñaki Eraña =

Spanish footballer and coach

Personal information
- Full name: Ignacio Eraña Cassi
- Date of birth: 3 June 1965 (age 61)
- Place of birth: Gijón, Spain
- Height: 1.78 m (5 ft 10 in)
- Position: Midfielder

Youth career
- 1976–1983: Sporting Gijón

Senior career*
Years	Team	Apps	(Gls)
1983–1986	Sporting Gijón B	99	(11)
1984–1990	Sporting Gijón	80	(3)
1987	→ Recreativo (loan)	16	(0)
1990–1992	Murcia	75	(8)
1992–1995	Logroñés	91	(5)
1995–1997	Compostela	53	(0)
1997–1998	Extremadura	44	(6)
1998–1999	Numancia	17	(0)
Total		475	(33)

Managerial career
- 2015–2016: Ceares
- * Club domestic league appearances and goals

Ignacio 'Iñaki' Eraña Cassi (born 3 June 1965) is a Spanish former professional footballer who played as a midfielder.

== Playing career ==
Born in Gijón, Asturias, Eraña started his career with local Sporting de Gijón, making his debut on 3 October 1984 and scoring the fourth goal in a 6–1 win over Club Siero in the first round of the Copa del Rey. He signed his first professional contract in 1986, but was loaned to Segunda División club Recreativo de Huelva in January of the following year.

Eraña subsequently returned to Sporting, playing three consecutive seasons in La Liga before being loaned to Real Murcia CF in the second tier. He made his debut in the former competition on 1 November 1987, coming on as a late substitute in a 1–1 away draw against Valencia CF.

From 1992 until his retirement at the age of 34, Eraña represented CD Logroñés, SD Compostela, CF Extremadura and CD Numancia, with six of the campaigns being spent in the top flight. He also achieved promotion from division two with the third and fourth sides.

== Managerial career ==
After retiring, Eraña worked with Sporting Gijón in directorial capacities, leaving his post in January 2015. In October of that year, he started his coaching career by being appointed at local amateurs UC Ceares. He resigned at the end of the season, and ceased to be involved in the sport.

== Personal life ==
Eraña's father, Juan (born 1938), was also a footballer. He too represented Sporting, making over 200 appearances for the club in the 1960s and helping them win promotion to the top tier in 1969–70.

Two of Juan's older brothers, Jaime and Felipe, played for Sestao Sport Club in their native Basque Country during the 50s.
