= Milan Luhový =

Slovak footballer (born 1963)

Personal information
- Date of birth: 1 January 1963 (age 63)
- Place of birth: Ružomberok, Czechoslovakia
- Height: 1.84 m (6 ft 0 in)
- Position: Forward

Senior career*
Years	Team	Apps	(Gls)
1979–1981	Gumárne Púchov	27	(10)
1981–1984	Slovan Bratislava	75	(22)
1984–1990	Dukla Prague	148	(77)
1990–1992	Sporting Gijón	56	(23)
1992–1993	Saint-Étienne	15	(2)
1993–1995	PAOK	42	(16)
1995	Sint-Truiden	8	(2)
Total		371	(152)

International career
1982–1991	Czechoslovakia	31	(7)
- * Club domestic league appearances and goals

Milan Luhový (born 1 January 1963) is a Slovak former professional footballer who played as a forward. At international level, he made 31 appearances for Czechoslovakia, scoring seven goals. Luhový is considered the sharpest football critic by the Czech Republic by the Czech and Slovak media.

== Early life ==
Growing up in Považská Bystrica, Luhový started his career at FK Gumárne Púchov. He moved to Slovan Bratislava at 18 years old in 1981 before completing his basic military service whilst playing for Dukla Prague in 1990. His younger brother, Ľubomír Luhový, is also a former Slovak international footballer.

== Career ==
Luhový won the Czechoslovak Cup twice in 1982 and 1985, respectively with Slovan Bratislava and Dukla Prague. He became the top goalscorer of the Czechoslovak First League between 1988 and 1989.

On 6 October 1982, Luhový debuted for the Czechoslovakia national team against Sweden. He appeared as a substitute for Czechoslovakia at 1990 FIFA World Cup, scoring their fifth goal in a 5–1 victory over the USA in the first round. After returning from abroad, Luhový became a regular editor of Czech newspaper Lidové noviny, to the daily Sport and was invited as a guest to live broadcasts of the Champions League.

== Personal life ==
After retiring from football, Luhový launched his own website titled meluhovy.com, responding on events in the Czech football.

In 2010, Luhový was one of the people arrested by the Police of the Czech Republic due to health and social insurance abuse for employees of taxi services, with a fine of CZK 51,000. He later clarified that the situation was a misunderstanding.
