= Eloy Olaya =

Spanish footballer

Eloy
Personal information
- Full name: Eloy José Olaya Prendes
- Date of birth: 10 July 1964 (age 62)
- Place of birth: Gijón, Spain
- Height: 1.67 m (5 ft 6 in)
- Position: Forward

Youth career
- Colegio Inmaculada
- Sporting Gijón

Senior career*
Years	Team	Apps	(Gls)
1979–1988	Sporting Gijón	191	(37)
1981–1983	Sporting Gijón B	56	(13)
1988–1995	Valencia	203	(37)
1995–1996	Sporting Gijón	36	(3)
1996–1998	Badajoz	28	(4)
Total		514	(94)

International career
1980	Spain U16	2	(0)
1981–1982	Spain U18	13	(5)
1983–1986	Spain U21	10	(4)
1985–1990	Spain	15	(4)
- * Club domestic league appearances and goals

Eloy José Olaya Prendes (born 10 July 1964), known simply as Eloy, is a Spanish former professional footballer who played as a forward.

== Club career ==
Eloy was born in Gijón, Asturias. During his career, he played for Sporting de Gijón (being part of a strong 80's team that achieved two fourth places in La Liga, in 1985 and 1987, with the player scoring 11 goals from 43 appearances in the latter season), Valencia CF (with roughly the same individual records, helping the Che to a runner-up spot in the 1989–90 campaign) and CD Badajoz (retiring after an unassuming Segunda División spell). On 28 November 1979, aged only 15, he made his professional debut, appearing for the side in a Copa del Rey match against CD Turón as the Royal Spanish Football Federation did not allow clubs to field players from the reserves, which were able to also compete in the tournament in that period.

After retiring in 1998 at the age of 34, with top-tier totals of 430 games and 77 goals, Eloy served as director of football for his main club Sporting, from 2001 to 2006.

== International career ==
Eloy earned 15 caps and scored four goals for the Spain national team in five years. He was a participant in the 1986 FIFA World Cup where he netted against Algeria in a 3–0 win, also missing in a penalty shootout quarter-final loss to Belgium, and UEFA Euro 1988 (no appearances).

Eloy's debut came on 20 November 1985 in a 0–0 friendly with Austria, played in Zaragoza.

=== International goals ===
#	Date	Venue	Opponent	Score	Result	Competition
1.	22 January 1986	Insular, Las Palmas, Spain	Soviet Union	2–0	2–0	Friendly
2.	12 June 1986	Tecnológico, Monterrey, Mexico	Algeria	0–3	0–3	1986 FIFA World Cup
3.	1 April 1987	Prater, Vienna, Austria	Austria	0–1	2–3	Euro 1988 qualifying
4.	1 April 1987	Prater, Vienna, Austria	Austria	1–2	2–3	Euro 1988 qualifying

== Honours ==
Valencia

- Copa del Rey runner-up: 1994–95

Spain U21

- UEFA European Under-21 Championship: 1986

== See also ==
- List of La Liga players (400+ appearances)
- List of Sporting de Gijón players (+100 appearances)
- List of Valencia CF players (+100 appearances)
