= Óscar Celada =

Spanish footballer and doctor

Personal information
- Full name: Óscar Luis Celada
- Date of birth: 9 March 1966 (age 60)
- Place of birth: Luarca, Spain
- Height: 1.82 m (6 ft 0 in)
- Position: Midfielder

Youth career
- Luarca

Senior career*
Years	Team	Apps	(Gls)
1985–1988	Sporting Gijón B	100	(17)
1988–1994	Sporting Gijón	129	(10)
1988–1989	→ Langreo (loan)	14	(1)
1994–1997	Zaragoza	60	(1)
1997–1999	Las Palmas	60	(4)
1999–2001	Universidad LP	57	(2)
Total		420	(35)
- * Club domestic league appearances and goals

Óscar Luis Celada (born 9 March 1966), known simply as Óscar as a player, is a Spanish former professional footballer who played as a midfielder.

He amassed La Liga totals of 189 matches and 11 goals over nine seasons, mainly with Sporting de Gijón (six years).

== Playing career ==
Born in Luarca, Óscar arrived at Sporting de Gijón also in his native Asturias in 1985, but had to wait three years for his first opportunities with the main squad. His best year came in the 1993–94 season, as he started in all his 26 appearances (21 complete games) while the club retained its La Liga status.

Óscar signed with Real Zaragoza in 1994, helping the Aragonese to that campaign's UEFA Cup Winners' Cup – he did not leave the bench in the final– but he was mainly a fringe player during his three-year spell.

In his final four years, Óscar played two seasons apiece with Las Palmas and Universidad de Las Palmas, retiring in June 2001 at 35.

== Post-retirement ==
After obtaining his degree in medicine, Celada returned to Zaragoza in 2008 as chief doctor. The following year, in the same capacity, he joined the Spain national team.

In July 2017, still as part of the medical department and three years after cutting ties with Zaragoza, Celada was appointed at Atlético Madrid.
