= Cundi (footballer) =

Spanish footballer

Personal information
- Full name: Secundino Suárez Vázquez
- Date of birth: 13 April 1955 (age 71)
- Place of birth: Sotrondio, Spain
- Height: 1.70 m (5 ft 7 in)
- Position: Left-back

Youth career
- Ensidesa
- Sporting Gijón

Senior career*
Years	Team	Apps	(Gls)
1975–1989	Sporting Gijón	310	(9)
1976–1977	→ Poblense (loan)		

International career
1976	Spain amateur	1	(0)
1981	Spain B	3	(0)
1978–1981	Spain	9	(0)
- * Club domestic league appearances and goals

Secundino Suárez Vázquez (born 13 April 1955), known as Cundi, is a Spanish former professional footballer who played as a left-back.

His career was intimately connected with Sporting de Gijón, which he represented for 15 years.

== Club career ==
Born in Sotrondio, Asturias, Cundi spent his professional career almost entirely with local powerhouse Sporting de Gijón, save for a one-year loan spell with UD Poblense due to compulsory military service. From the age of 20 onwards he was an undisputed starter for the La Liga club, appearing in 406 competitive games during his 15-year spell.

In the 1986–87 season, Cundi played 41 matches (3,549 minutes) for an eventual fourth-place finish. He did not receive one single red card during his career.

== International career ==
Cundi earned nine caps for the Spain national team in two and a half years, and was selected for UEFA Euro 1980. His debut came on 4 October 1978 in a Euro 1980 qualifier against Yugoslavia (2–1 loss in Zagreb).

== Personal life ==
Cundi's son, Rubén, was also a footballer. An attacking midfielder, he also started out at Sporting de Gijón.
