= Manuel Jiménez (footballer, born 1956) =

Spanish footballer

Personal information
- Full name: Manuel Enrique Jiménez Abalo
- Date of birth: 27 October 1956 (age 70)
- Place of birth: Vilagarcía de Arousa, Spain
- Height: 1.77 m (5 ft 10 in)
- Position: Centre-back

Youth career
- Carril
- Arosa

Senior career*
Years	Team	Apps	(Gls)
1976–1977	Arosa		
1977–1979	Deportivo Gijón		
1979–1991	Sporting Gijón	420	(8)
1991–1992	Burgos	38	(0)
Total		458	(8)

International career
1980–1981	Spain B	6	(0)
1981	Spain	1	(0)
- * Club domestic league appearances and goals

Manuel Enrique Jiménez Abalo (born 27 October 1956) is a Spanish former professional footballer who played as a central defender.

== Club career ==
Jiménez was born in Vilagarcía de Arousa, Province of Pontevedra, Galicia. During his professional career, he played for Sporting de Gijón and Real Burgos CF. He spent 12 of his 13 seasons with the Asturias club, appearing in 534 competitive matches – he never played less than 30 games in La Liga, and helped the team to the fourth place in the 1986–87 campaign after contributing 43 appearances (3,870 minutes).

With Burgos, in his final season, Jiménez played all the matches and minutes and the modest Castile and León side retained their top-division status while posting the eighth-best defensive record in the league. He retired aged 35, and later worked as a sports agent.

== International career ==
Jiménez earned one cap for Spain on 18 November 1981, a 3–2 friendly win in Poland, being selected to the 1982 FIFA World Cup squad.

== See also ==
- List of La Liga players (400+ appearances)
- List of Sporting de Gijón players (100+ appearances)
