= Juan Carlos Ablanedo =

Spanish footballer (born 1963)

Personal information
- Full name: Juan Carlos Ablanedo Iglesias
- Date of birth: 2 September 1963 (age 63)
- Place of birth: Mieres, Spain
- Height: 1.77 m (5 ft 10 in)
- Position: Goalkeeper

Youth career
- Sporting Gijón

Senior career*
Years	Team	Apps	(Gls)
1981–1984	Sporting Gijón B	94	(0)
1983–1999	Sporting Gijón	401	(0)
Total		495	(0)

International career
1981–1982	Spain U18	10	(0)
1984–1986	Spain U21	12	(0)
1986–1987	Spain U23	2	(0)
1986–1991	Spain	4	(0)
- * Club domestic league appearances and goals

Juan Carlos Ablanedo Iglesias (Spanish pronunciation: [xwaŋ ˈkaɾlos aβlaˈneðo]; (Note: In isolation, Juan is pronounced [xwan].) born 2 September 1963) is a Spanish former footballer who played as a goalkeeper.

Due to his above-average reflexes, he was nicknamed El gato (cat), and represented local club Sporting de Gijón for almost 20 years as a professional.

== Club career ==
Ablanedo was born in Mieres, Asturias. He played solely for Sporting de Gijón after being a product of the club's famed youth system, Mareo, and received his first-team debut on 2 January 1983, as a second-half substitute in a 1–0 home win against RCD Español after José Aurelio Rivero was sent off.

After two further games in the following season, Ablanedo became the Asturian side's undisputed starter, totalling 399 in La Liga. In the 1986–87 campaign, as Sporting finished fourth, he appeared in 42 matches (out of 44, as the league had a second stage).

Ablanedo retired from football at the end of 1998–99, with Sporting now in the Segunda División. He also had some serious injuries during his career, making only two appearances in his last season and none whatsoever in 1991–92. He was awarded the Ricardo Zamora Trophy three times.

== International career ==
Ablanedo earned four caps for Spain, the first coming on 24 September 1986 in a 3–1 friendly victory over Greece in Gijón. He was a backup at both the 1986 and 1990 FIFA World Cups.

Previously, Ablanedo helped the nation's under-21s to win the 1986 European Championship.

== Personal life ==
Ablanedo's older brother, José Luis, was also a footballer. A defender, he too played several top-tier seasons with Sporting, and they were hence known as Ablanedo I and Ablanedo II.

== Honours ==
Spain U21

- UEFA European Under-21 Championship: 1986

Individual

- Ricardo Zamora Trophy: 1984–85, 1985–86, 1989–90

== See also ==
- List of one-club men
