= José Luis Ablanedo =

Spanish footballer

Personal information
- Full name: José Luis Ablanedo Iglesias
- Date of birth: 22 August 1962 (age 64)
- Place of birth: Mieres, Spain
- Height: 1.85 m (6 ft 1 in)
- Position: Centre-back

Youth career
- Sporting Gijón

Senior career*
Years	Team	Apps	(Gls)
1980–1994	Sporting Gijón	174	(7)
1981–1985	Sporting Gijón B	98	(1)
1991–1992	→ Español (loan)	8	(0)
Total		280	(8)
- * Club domestic league appearances and goals

José Luis Ablanedo Iglesias (Spanish pronunciation: [xoˈse lwis aβlaˈneðo]; born 22 August 1962) is a Spanish former footballer who played as a central defender.

== Club career ==
Born in Mieres, Asturias, Ablanedo played the vast majority of his career with local Sporting de Gijón, making his senior debut whilst still a junior in a Copa del Rey match against amateurs CD Turón in November 1980. He spent several years with the reserves in the lower leagues, and played his first La Liga game with the main squad on 22 April 1984 in a 3–0 away loss against Real Betis.

Ablanedo was definitely promoted to the first team for the 1985–86 season, and contributed a career-best 43 matches and four goals as Sporting finished in fourth position the following campaign. He spent 1991–92 on loan to RCD Español also in the top flight, and retired with his main club in June 1994 at age 31.

== Personal life ==
Ablanedo's younger brother, Juan Carlos, was also a footballer. A goalkeeper, he played solely for Sporting, and they were hence known as Ablanedo I and Ablanedo II.
