= Joaquín (footballer, born 1956) =

Spanish footballer

Personal information
- Full name: Joaquín Alonso González
- Date of birth: 9 June 1956 (age 70)
- Place of birth: Oviedo, Spain
- Height: 1.83 m (6 ft 0 in)
- Position: Attacking midfielder

Youth career
- Astur

Senior career*
Years	Team	Apps	(Gls)
1975–1976	Sporting Gijón B		
1976–1992	Sporting Gijón	514	(66)

International career
1977	Spain U21	1	(0)
1979–1982	Spain U23	8	(0)
1979–1980	Spain amateur	10	(1)
1979–1988	Spain	18	(1)
1996–2002	Spain (beach)		

Managerial career
- 2002–2019: Spain (beach)
- * Club domestic league appearances and goals

Joaquín Alonso González (born 9 June 1956), known simply as Joaquín, is a Spanish former footballer who played as an attacking midfielder.

== Club career ==
Joaquín was born in Oviedo, Asturias. During his 16-year professional career, he played solely for Sporting de Gijón even though he was born in the city of neighbouring Real Oviedo. After 17 appearances and one goal in his debut season in La Liga he became an undisputed starter, going on to take part in a further 462 top-division games until June 1992 (644 overall), with a total of 65 goals.

In the 1986–87 campaign, as the team finished fourth, Joaquín scored eight times in 40 matches (third-best in the squad). He continued to feature prominently until the end of his career, retiring at the age of 36 with the most games played in the Spanish top flight, a record which stood for less than one year, however.

== International career ==
Joaquín earned 18 caps and scored once for Spain, and was selected to the 1982 FIFA World Cup squad. His debut came on 14 November 1979 in a 1–3 friendly defeat against Denmark, in Cádiz.

In 1996, Joaquín began playing beach soccer for Spain. In January 2002 he was appointed their head coach, and stayed in the role for 17 years until he stepped down in November 2019.

Joaquín also served on the technical staff of the women's national team in the same sport.

=== International goals ===
#	Date	Venue	Opponent	Score	Result	Competition
1.	3 December 1986	Qemal Stafa, Tirana, Albania	Albania	1–2	1–2	Euro 1988 qualifying

== Honours ==
- Segunda División: 1976–77

== See also ==
- List of one-club men in association football
- List of La Liga players (400+ appearances)
- List of Sporting de Gijón players (100+ appearances)
