= List of Sporting de Gijón managers =

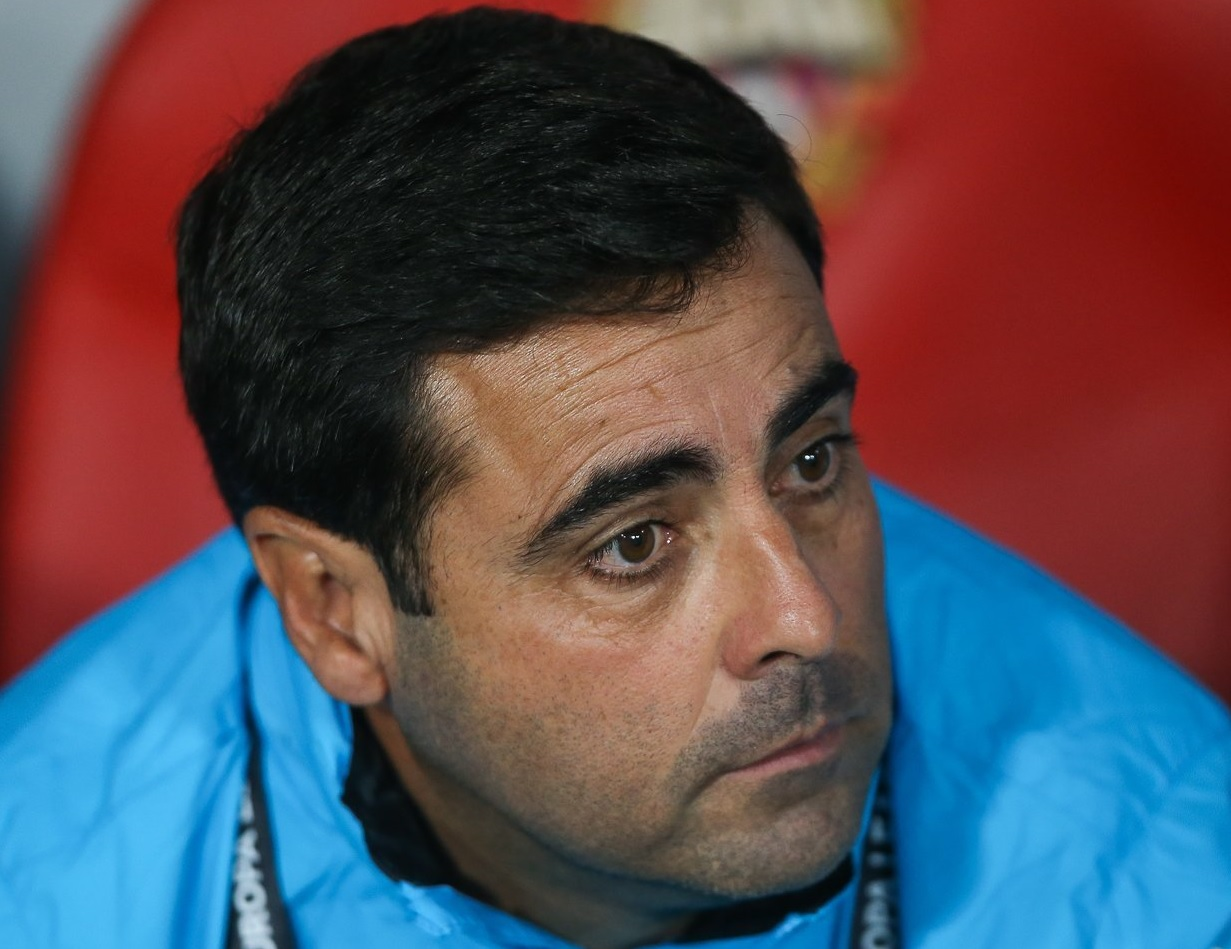
David Gallego is the current head coach of the club.

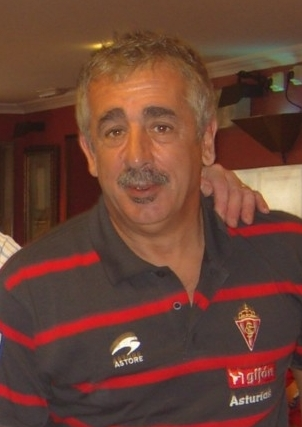
Manolo Preciado coached 218 league games consecutively.

The following is a list of Real Sporting managers from the beginning of the club's official managerial records in 1921 to the present day.

Since 1921, Real Sporting had, with the current one, 53 managers in all its history. The first coach was Austrian Karl Orth, who spent two years in Gijón. 39 coaches were from Spain and only 14 of them foreign ones.

The club's longest-serving manager in La Liga is José Manuel Díaz Novoa, who had six spells managing the club from 1979 to 1999, totalling 226 league matches, followed by Manolo Preciado with 218 (the manager who coached more games consecutively) and Vicente Miera, with 166.

== List of managers ==
Only league games are counted, including the playoffs games.

Nat	Name	From	To	P	W	D	L	GF	GA	PCT
(Austria)	Karl Orth	1921	1923							
(Uruguay)	José Monegal	1925	1926							
(Spain)	Edmundo Morán	1926	1926							
(Spain)	Manuel Meana	1926	1929	18	7	5	6	41	35	.389
(England)	Randolph Galloway	1929	1931	36	17	5	14	71	59	.472
(Spain)	Manuel Meana (2)	1931	1933							
(Spain)	Ramón Herrera	1933	1934							
(Hungary)	Károly Plattkó	1934	1935	14	7	2	5	23	21	.500
(England)	Jack Greenwell	1935	1936	14	6	4	4	32	26	.429
(Spain)	José María Peña	1939	1942	60	31	12	17	141	97	.517
(Spain)	Martín Marculeta	1942	1943	24	13	3	8	51	46	.542
(Spain)	Amadeo Sánchez	1943	1945	26	9	6	11	42	46	.346
(Spain)	Quico Campomanes	1945	1946	26	9	7	10	37	39	.346
(Spain)	José María Peña (2)	1946	1947	26	10	5	11	51	59	.385
(Austria)	Charles Rumbold	1947	1948	26	7	4	15	37	69	.269
(Spain)	Manuel Meana (3)	1948	1949	26	12	5	9	56	44	.462
(Spain)	Paco Campos	1949	1950	30	17	5	8	89	46	.567
(Spain)	Amadeo Sánchez (2)	1950	1952	56	30	6	20	139	99	.536
(Spain)	Luisín	1952	1952	6	3	1	2	10	8	.500
(Spain)	Juan José Nogués	1952	1954	50	16	10	24	65	103	.320
(Spain)	Luisín (2)	1954	1954	10	2	0	8	18	32	.200
(Spain)	Paco Campos (2)	1954	1955	30	15	8	7	50	34	.500
(Spain)	Amadeo Sánchez (3)	1955	1956	30	14	4	12	51	46	.467
(Spain)	Jesús Barrio	1956	1958	68	38	10	20	153	83	.559
(Spain)	Mundo	1958	1959	23	5	5	13	20	59	.217
(Spain)	Luisín (3)	1959	1959	1	1	0	0	3	2	1.000
(Brazil)	Nelson Adams	1959	1959	6	1	1	4	2	9	.167
(Argentina)	Abel Picabea	1959	1960	15	8	1	6	30	22	.533
(Spain)	Amadeo Sánchez (4)	1960	1960	17	7	3	7	28	25	.412
(Spain)	Germán Menéndez	1960	1961	18	5	3	10	27	33	.278
(Spain)	Amadeo Sánchez (5)	1960	1960	10	4	2	4	12	12	.400
(Spain)	Jesús Barrio (2)	1961	1962	27	8	5	14	43	57	.296
(Spain)	Amadeo Sánchez (6)	1962	1962	3	2	0	1	9	6	.667
(Spain)	José Luis Molinuevo	1962	1966	118	61	24	33	227	158	.517
(Spain)	Amadeo Sánchez (7)	1966	1966	4	1	1	2	5	6	.250
(Spain)	Román Galarraga	1966	1968	59	32	14	13	98	53	.542
(Spain)	Manuel Badás	1968	1968	3	0	2	1	4	9	.000
(Spain)	Carriega	1968	1972	123	55	26	42	194	146	.447
(Spain)	Jesús Barrio (3)	1972	1972	17	6	5	6	19	13	.353
(Spain)	Mariano Moreno	1972	1973	40	12	7	21	37	48	.300
(Spain)	Jesús Barrio (4)	1973	1973	14	7	1	6	23	27	.500
(Spain)	Pasieguito	1973	1975	54	16	15	23	66	72	.296
(France)	Pierre Sinibaldi	1975	1976	28	7	8	13	36	35	.250
(Spain)	Vicente Miera	1976	1979	106	50	29	27	165	113	.472
(Spain)	José Manuel Díaz Novoa	1979	1980	34	16	7	11	47	34	.471
(Spain)	Vicente Miera (2)	1980	1982	60	21	16	23	83	74	.350
(Spain)	José Manuel Díaz Novoa (2)	1982	1982	8	3	3	2	13	10	.375
(Socialist Federal Republic of Yugoslavia)	Vujadin Boškov	1982	1984	68	20	23	25	69	79	.308
(Spain)	José Manuel Díaz Novoa (3)	1984	1988	150	56	53	41	173	149	.373
(Spain)	Jesús Aranguren	1988	1989	42	13	10	19	43	48	.310
(Spain)	Carlos García Cuervo	1989	1990	34	12	9	13	36	28	.353
(Spain)	Ciriaco Cano	1990	1992	64	28	16	20	72	64	.438
(Netherlands)	Bert Jacobs	1992	1993	29	7	9	13	28	49	.194
(Spain)	Carlos García Cuervo (2)	1993	1993	9	4	3	2	10	8	.444
(Spain)	Mariano García Remón	1993	1995	62	20	13	29	68	102	.323
(Spain)	Carlos García Cuervo (3)	1995	1995	13	3	4	6	16	22	.188
(Argentina)	Ricardo Néstor Rezza	1995	1996	22	7	3	12	17	28	.318
(Spain)	Ramiro Solís	1996	1996	1	1	0	0	3	2	1.000
(Spain)	José Manuel Díaz Novoa (4)	1996	1996	22	6	5	11	25	33	.273
(Spain)	Benito Floro	1996	1997	34	9	8	17	35	58	.265
(Spain)	Miguel Ángel Montes	1997	1997	12	4	3	5	13	19	.333
(Spain)	Antonio Maceda	1997	1997	11	0	2	9	10	22	.000
(Spain)	José Manuel Díaz Novoa (5)	1997	1998	16	1	4	11	12	28	.059
(Spain)	José Antonio Redondo	1998	1998	7	1	1	5	6	16	.143
(Spain)	Antonio López Habas	1998	1998	6	0	2	4	2	10	.000
(Spain)	José Antonio Redondo (2)	1998	1998	2	0	0	2	1	3	.000
(Netherlands)	Aad de Mos	1999	1999	11	3	4	4	9	12	.273
(Spain)	Pedro Braojos	1999	2000	55	26	11	18	74	61	.473
(Spain)	Ciriaco Cano (2)	2000	2000	10	4	3	3	13	9	.286
(Chile)	Vicente Cantatore	2000	2001	20	7	7	6	27	21	.350
(Spain)	Pepe Acebal	2001	2002	69	27	21	21	86	78	.391
(Spain)	Antonio Maceda (2)	2002	2003	37	11	17	9	43	38	.297
(Spain)	Marcelino García Toral	2003	2005	84	35	22	27	99	79	.417
(Spain)	Ciriaco Cano (3)	2005	2006	42	13	17	12	41	34	.310
(Spain)	Manuel Preciado	2006	2012	218	75	51	92	250	295	.344
(Spain)	Iñaki Tejada	2012	2012	2	0	1	1	1	5	.000
(Spain)	Javier Clemente	2012	2012	16	5	3	8	22	26	.313
(Spain)	Manolo Sánchez Murias	2012	2012	9	2	2	5	9	14	.182
(Spain)	José Ramón Sandoval	2012	2014	70	26	23	21	106	87	.371
(Spain)	Abelardo Fernández	2014	2017	105	37	33	35	124	131	.352
(Spain)	Rubi	2017	2017	20	4	7	9	23	35	.200
(Spain)	Paco Herrera	2017	2017	18	6	6	6	21	18	.333
(Spain)	Rubén Baraja	2017	2018	40	18	8	14	54	40	.450
(Spain)	José Alberto	2018	2019	53	20	15	18	55	54	.377
(Serbia)	Miroslav Đukić	2019	2020	21	8	5	8	20	17	.381
(Spain)	David Gallego	2020								–
