= 1984–85 Sporting de Gijón season =

Sporting de Gijón
1984–85 season
- Chairman: Manuel Vega-Arango
- Manager: José Manuel Díaz Novoa
- Stadium: El Molinón
- La Liga: 4th
- Copa del Rey: Quarterfinals
- Copa de la Liga: Semifinals
- Top goalscorer: Eloy (9); Quini (9)

The 1984–85 Sporting de Gijón season was the 24th season of the club in La Liga, the 10th consecutive after its last promotion.

== Squad ==
Note: Flags indicate national team as defined under FIFA eligibility rules; some limited exceptions apply. Players may hold more than one non-FIFA nationality.

No.	Pos.	Nation	Player
—	GK	ESP	Pedro Rodríguez
—	GK	ESP	Jesús Castro
—	GK	ESP	José Aurelio Rivero
—	GK	ESP	Ablanedo II
—	DF	ESP	Nicolás Pereda
—	DF	ESP	José Antonio Redondo
—	DF	ESP	Manolo Jiménez
—	DF	ESP	Antonio Maceda
—	DF	ESP	Mino
—	DF	ESP	Cundi
—	DF	ESP	José Manuel Espinosa
—	DF	ESP	Fernando Tocornal
—	DF	ESP	Esteban
—	DF	ESP	Pedro Luis
—	DF	ESP	César
—	DF	ESP	José Manuel Gancedo
—	DF	ESP	Eduardo Cobián
—	MF	ESP	Manuel Mesa
—	MF	ESP	David

No.	Pos.	Nation	Player
—	MF	ESP	Orlando
—	DF	ESP	Alberto Bernardo
—	MF	ESP	Emilio
—	MF	ESP	Tuto
—	MF	ESP	Jaime
—	MF	ESP	Joaquín
—	DF	ESP	Tino
—	FW	ESP	José Antonio Murias
—	FW	ESP	Miguel Ángel Oliver
—	FW	ESP	Luismi
—	FW	ESP	Camuel
—	FW	ESP	Eloy
—	FW	ESP	Zurdi
—	FW	ESP	Quini
—	FW	ARG	Enzo Ferrero
—	FW	ESP	Joaquín Villa
—	FW	ESP	Nacho
—	FW	ESP	Arnaldo Llabrés

== Competitions ==
=== La Liga ===
==== Results by round ====
Round	1	2	3	4	5	6	7	8	9	10	11	12	13	14	15	16	17	18	19	20	21	22	23	24	25	26	27	28	29	30	31	32	33	34
Ground	A	H	A	H	A	H	A	H	A	H	A	H	A	H	H	A	H	H	A	H	A	H	A	H	A	H	A	H	A	H	A	A	H	A
Result	L	D	L	W	D	W	D	D	W	W	D	D	D	D	L	W	D	D	D	L	D	W	D	W	W	W	D	W	W	W	L	L	W	W
Position	15	11	16	12	13	8	8	9	6	4	3	4	5	5	7	7	7	6	7	9	8	6	6	4	3	3	3	3	3	3	3	3	3	4

Source: BDFutbol
A = Away; H = Home; W = Win; D = Draw; L = Loss

==== League table ====
Pos	Team	Pld	W	D	L	GF	GA	GD	Pts	Qualification or relegation
2	Atlético Madrid	34	16	11	7	51	28	+23	43	Qualification for the Cup Winners' Cup first round (Note: Atlético Madrid qualified for the European Cup Winners' Cup as winners of the Copa del Rey.)
3	Athletic Bilbao	34	13	15	6	39	26	+13	41	Qualification for the UEFA Cup first round
4	Sporting Gijón	34	13	15	6	34	23	+11	41	Qualification for the UEFA Cup first round
5	Real Madrid	34	13	10	11	46	36	+10	36	Qualification for the UEFA Cup first round
6	Osasuna	34	13	8	13	38	38	0	34	Qualification for the UEFA Cup first round

Source: BDFútbol
Rules for classification: 1) Points; 2) Head-to-head results; 3) Goal difference; 4) Number of goals scored

==== Matches ====
2 September 1984 1	Racing Santander	1–0	Real Sporting	Santander
	Campbell 44'	Report		Stadium: El Sardinero; Referee: Peraita Ibáñez

9 September 1984 2	Real Sporting	1–1	Real Madrid	Gijón
	Eloy 16'	Report	Azcona 33'	Stadium: El Molinón; Referee: Marín López
Note: The match was played with youth and amateur players due to an ongoing strike caused by professional players.

23 September 1984 4	Real Sporting	2–0	Elche	Gijón
	Eloy 24'; Mesa 82'	Report		Stadium: El Molinón; Referee: Damín Rendón

30 September 1984 5	Osasuna	0–0	Real Sporting	Pamplona
		Report	Mino (yellow card) 0' (yellow-red card) 51'	Stadium: El Sadar; Referee: Miguel Pérez

7 October 1984 6	Real Sporting	1–0	Español	Gijón
	Tocornal 29'	Report		Stadium: El Molinón; Referee: Soriano Aladren

12 October 1984 7	Real Sociedad	0–0	Real Sporting	San Sebastián
		Report		Stadium: Atocha; Referee: Bayarri Ribelles

19 October 1984 8	Real Sporting	1–1	Real Betis	Gijón
	Joaquín 42'	Report	Rincón 81'	Stadium: El Molinón; Referee: Borrás del Barrio

28 October 1984 9	Murcia	0–3	Real Sporting	Murcia
	Higinio (red card) 24'	Report	Tino 35'; Eloy 44', 65'	Stadium: La Condomina; Referee: Socorro González

1 November 1984 3(*)	Zaragoza	2–0	Real Sporting	Zaragoza
	Señor 55' (pen.); Amarilla 77'	Report		Stadium: La Romareda; Referee: Pérez Sánchez
Note: The match was originally scheduled for 16 September 1984, but was postponed due to a strike caused by professional players.

4 November 1984 10	Real Sporting	2–1	Atlético Madrid	Gijón
	Maceda 31'; Joaquín 44'	Report	Marina 56'; Landáburu (red card) 89'	Stadium: El Molinón; Referee: Benavente Garasa

18 November 1984 11	Hércules	1–1	Real Sporting	Alicante
	Sanabria 44'	Report	Eloy 37'	Stadium: José Rico Pérez; Referee: Damín Rendón

21 November 1984 12	Real Sporting	1–1	Valencia	Gijón
	Eloy 6'	Report	Cabrera 45'	Stadium: El Molinón; Referee: Franco Martínez

25 November 1984 13	Málaga	0–0	Real Sporting	Málaga
		Report		Stadium: La Rosaleda; Referee: García de Loza

2 December 1984 14	Real Sporting	2–2	Barcelona	Gijón
	Ferrero 40'; Quini 41'	Report	Cundi 5' (o.g.); Archibald 26'	Stadium: El Molinón; Referee: Valdés Sánchez

9 December 1984 15	Real Sporting	1–3	Valladolid	Gijón
	Quini 58'	Report	Yáñez 1'; Jorge Alonso 28'; Fonseca 83' (pen.)	Stadium: El Molinón; Referee: Peraita Ibáñez

16 December 1984 16	Sevilla	0–1	Real Sporting	Seville
		Report	Ferrero 84'	Stadium: Ramón Sánchez Pizjuán; Referee: Guruceta Muro

23 December 1984 17	Real Sporting	1–1	Athletic Bilbao	Gijón
	Quini 19'	Report	Sola 69'	Stadium: El Molinón; Referee: Álvarez Margüenda

30 December 1984 18	Real Sporting	0–0	Racing Santander	Gijón
		Report		Stadium: El Molinón; Referee: Pérez Sánchez

6 January 1985 19	Real Madrid	0–0	Real Sporting	Madrid
		Report		Stadium: Santiago Bernabéu; Referee: Casajuana Rifà

13 January 1985 20	Real Sporting	0–2	Zaragoza	Gijón
		Report	Señor 23' (pen.) Maceda 72' (o.g.)	Stadium: El Molinón; Referee: Ceballos Borrego

20 January 1985 21	Elche	0–0	Real Sporting	Elche
		Report		Stadium: Nuevo Estadio; Referee: Sánchez Arminio

27 January 1985 22	Real Sporting	1–0	Osasuna	Gijón
	Quini 60' (pen.)	Report		Stadium: El Molinón; Referee: Guruceta Muro

3 February 1985 23	Español	2–2	Real Sporting	Barcelona
	Giménez 55', 85'; Márquez (red card) 80'	Report	Olaya 58'; Quini 80' (pen.)	Stadium: Sarrià; Referee: Martín Navarrete

10 February 1985 24	Real Sporting	1–0	Real Sociedad	Gijón
	Zurdi 1'	Report		Stadium: El Molinón; Referee: Lamo Castillo

17 February 1985 25	Real Betis	1–2	Real Sporting	Seville
	Mantilla 87'	Report	Tino 25'; Mino 83'	Stadium: Benito Villamarín; Referee: Miguel Pérez

20 February 1985 26	Real Sporting	1–0	Murcia	Gijón
	Quini 65'	Report		Stadium: El Molinón; Referee: Crespo Aurre

3 March 1985 27	Atlético Madrid	0–0	Real Sporting	Madrid
		Report	Maceda (yellow card) 50'	Stadium: Vicente Calderón; Referee: Merino González

9 March 1985 28	Real Sporting	4–0	Hércules	Gijón
	Quini 13', 83'; Mesa 45'; Eloy 57'	Report		Stadium: El Molinón; Referee: Andújar Oliver

17 March 1985 29	Valencia	0–2	Real Sporting	Valencia
		Report	Maceda 53'; Eloy 82'	Stadium: Luis Casanova; Referee: Pérez Sánchez

24 March 1985 30	Real Sporting	2–0	Málaga	Gijón
	Maceda 9'; Mino 55'	Report		Stadium: El Molinón; Referee: Sánchez Molina Soto

30 March 1985 31	Barcelona	2–0	Real Sporting	Barcelona
	Rojo 15'; Clos 27'	Report		Stadium: Nou Camp; Referee: Bayarri Ribelles

7 April 1985 32	Valladolid	0–0	Real Sporting	Valladolid
		Report		Stadium: José Zorrilla; Referee: Peraita Ibáñez

14 April 1985 33	Real Sporting	2–0	Sevilla	Gijón
	Quini 11' (pen.); Maceda 85'	Report		Stadium: El Molinón; Referee: Miguel Pérez

21 April 1985 34	Athletic Bilbao	2–0	Real Sporting	Gijón
	Julio Salinas 11'; Dani 69'	Report		Stadium: El Molinón; Referee: Martín Navarrete

=== Copa del Rey ===
==== Matches ====
3 October 1984 First round First leg	Siero	1–6	Real Sporting	Siero
	Mamel 74'	Report	Camuel 45', 56'; Zurdi 49', 71'; Eraña 67'; Ferrero 77'	Stadium: Luis Miranda; Referee: Benavente Garasa

25 October 1984 First round Second leg	Real Sporting	12–0 (18–1 agg.)	Siero	Gijón
	Espinosa; Luismi x2' Camuel x5' Zurdi; Roberto x3'	Report	Cundo 3'	Stadium: El Molinón; Referee: Fernández Sánchez

7 November 1984 Second round First leg	Oviedo Aficionados	0–1	Real Sporting	Oviedo
		Report	Redondo 25'	Stadium: Carlos Tartiere; Referee: Urío Velázquez

13 November 1984 Second round Second leg	Real Sporting	5–0 (6–0 agg.)	Oviedo Aficionados	Gijón
	Tino 7'; Camuel 20'; Nacho 30'; Ferrero 52', 54'	Report		Stadium: El Molinón; Referee: Sánchez Arminio

13 December 1984 Third round First leg	Constancia	0–0	Real Sporting	Inca
				Stadium: Nou Camp

8 January 1985 Third round Second leg	Real Sporting	3–0 (3–0 agg.)	Constancia	Gijón
	Tocornal 5'; Quini 14', 49'	Report		Stadium: El Molinón; Referee: Eusebio Álvarez

30 January 1985 Fourth round First leg	Sestao	1–0	Real Sporting	Sestao
	Primi 35'			Stadium: Las Llanas; Referee: Ramos Marcos

6 February 1985 Fourth round Second leg	Real Sporting	3–1 (3–2 agg.)	Sestao	Gijón
	Eloy 15'; Quini 52', 89'	Report	Biota 40'	Stadium: El Molinón; Referee: García de Loza

13 March 1985 Round of 16; First leg	Real Sporting	0–0	Valencia	Valencia
		Report		Stadium: Luis Casanova; Referee: Pes Pérez

3 April 1985 Round of 16; Second leg	Valencia	1–1 (a.e.t.) (1–1 agg.) (1–4 p)	Real Sporting	Valencia
	Urruti 97'	Report	Quini 118'	Stadium: Luis Casanova; Referee: Guruceta Muro
	Penalties
	Ribes (penalty scored); Urruti (penalty missed); Sixto (penalty missed)		(penalty scored) Eloy; (penalty scored) Jiménez; (penalty scored) Zurdi; (penalty scored) Quini

17 April 1985 Quarterfinals; First leg	Real Sporting	1–2	Atlético Madrid	Gijón
	Zurdi 58'	Report	Marina 2', 69'	Stadium: El Molinón; Referee: Merino González

15 May 1985 Quarterfinals; Second leg	Atlético Madrid	0–0 (2–1 agg.)	Real Sporting	Madrid
		Report		Stadium: Vicente Calderón; Referee: Marín López

=== Copa de la Liga ===
==== Matches ====
4 May 1985 Second round First leg	Real Sporting	1–1	Sevilla	Gijón
	Quini 85'	Report	López 13'	Stadium: El Molinón; Referee: Casajuana Rifà

1 May 1985 Second round Second leg	Sevilla	0–2 (1–3 agg.)	Real Sporting	Seville
		Report	Tocornal 72'; Quini 85'	Stadium: Ramón Sánchez Pizjuán; Referee: Crespo Aurre

12 May 1985 Quarterfinals; First leg	Real Sporting	2–0	Zaragoza	Gijón
	Quini 21', 68'	Report		Stadium: El Molinón; Referee: Mayoral Cedenilla

19 May 1985 Quarterfinals; Second leg	Zaragoza	2–1 (2–3 agg.)	Real Sporting	Zaragoza
	Ayneto 47'; Amarilla 66'	Report	Mino 57'	Stadium: La Romareda; Referee: Lamo Castillo

30 May 1985 Semifinals; First leg	Real Sporting	3–1	Real Madrid	Gijón
	Quini 20' (pen.); Mino 51'; Esteban 57'	Report	Míchel 36'	Stadium: El Molinón; Referee: Sánchez Arminio

2 June 1985 Semifinals; Second leg	Real Madrid	3–0 (4–3 agg.)	Real Sporting	Madrid
	Santillana 29', 36'; Pineda 59'; Juanito (yellow card) 0' (yellow-red card) 88'	Report		Stadium: Santiago Bernabéu; Referee: Enríquez Negreira

=== Friendly tournaments ===
==== Trofeo Costa Verde ====
17 August 1984 Semifinals	Sporting de Gijón	2–1	(Netherlands) FC Groningen	Gijón
	Eloy 70'; Ferrero 73'	Report	Roossien 36'	Stadium: El Molinón

18 August 1984 Final	Sporting de Gijón	2–0	Real Sociedad	Gijón
	Eloy 17'; Maceda 87'	Report		Stadium: El Molinón

==== Ramón de Carranza Trophy ====
25 August 1984 Semifinals	Barcelona	0–1	Sporting de Gijón	Cádiz
		Report	Mesa 33'	Stadium: Ramón de Carranza

26 August 1984 Final	Sporting de Gijón	1–0	Athletic Bilbao	Cádiz
	Tocornal 69'	Report		Stadium: Ramón de Carranza

== Squad statistics ==
=== Appearances and goals ===
No.	Pos	Nat	Player	Total		La Liga		Copa de la Liga	
No.	Pos	Nat	Player	Apps	Goals	Apps	Goals	Apps	Goals
	GK	(Spain) ESP	Pedro Rodríguez	1	0	1+0	0	0+0	0
	GK	(Spain) ESP	Jesús Castro	0	0	0+0	0	0+0	0
	GK	(Spain) ESP	José Aurelio Rivero	2	0	0+2	0	0+0	0
	GK	(Spain) ESP	Ablanedo II	39	0	33+0	0	6+0	0
	DF	(Spain) ESP	Nicolás Pereda	6	0	5+1	0	0+0	0
	DF	(Spain) ESP	José Antonio Redondo	6	0	4+2	0	0+0	0
	DF	(Spain) ESP	Manolo Jiménez	39	0	33+0	0	6+0	0
	DF	(Spain) ESP	Antonio Maceda	37	4	31+0	4	6+0	0
	DF	(Spain) ESP	Mino	36	4	31+0	2	5+0	2
	DF	(Spain) ESP	Cundi	32	0	25+1	0	6+0	0
	DF	(Spain) ESP	José Manuel Espinosa	27	0	18+3	0	6+0	0
	DF	(Spain) ESP	Fernando Tocornal	26	2	14+9	1	0+3	1
	DF	(Spain) ESP	Esteban	15	1	7+2	0	6+0	1
	DF	(Spain) ESP	Pedro Luis	1	0	0+1	0	0+0	0
	DF	(Spain) ESP	César	1	0	1+0	0	0+0	0
	DF	(Spain) ESP	José Manuel Gancedo	1	0	1+0	0	0+0	0
	DF	(Spain) ESP	Eduardo Cobián	1	0	1+0	0	0+0	0
	MF	(Spain) ESP	Manuel Mesa	32	2	25+3	2	3+1	0
	MF	(Spain) ESP	David	8	0	1+7	0	0+0	0
	MF	(Spain) ESP	Orlando	1	0	1+0	0	0+0	0
	MF	(Spain) ESP	Alberto Bernardo	0	0	0+0	0	0+0	0
	MF	(Spain) ESP	Emilio	1	0	1+0	0	0+0	0
	MF	(Spain) ESP	Tuto	1	0	1+0	0	0+0	0
	MF	(Spain) ESP	Jaime	7	0	3+2	0	1+1	0
	MF	(Spain) ESP	Joaquín	39	2	33+0	2	6+0	0
	MF	(Spain) ESP	Tino	29	2	21+7	2	1+0	0
	MF	(Spain) ESP	José Antonio Murias	1	0	1+0	0	0+0	0
	MF	(Spain) ESP	Miguel Ángel Oliver	1	0	1+0	0	0+0	0
	FW	(Spain) ESP	Luismi	2	0	1+0	0	0+1	0
	FW	(Spain) ESP	Camuel	0	0	0+0	0	0+0	0
	FW	(Spain) ESP	Eloy	37	9	33+0	9	4+0	0
	FW	(Spain) ESP	Zurdi	29	1	17+6	1	5+1	0
	FW	(Spain) ESP	Quini	27	14	15+6	9	5+1	5
	FW	(Argentina) ARG	Enzo Ferrero	15	2	10+4	2	0+1	0
	FW	(Spain) ESP	Joaquín Villa	3	0	0+1	0	0+2	0
	FW	(Spain) ESP	Nacho	8	0	5+3	0	0+0	0
	FW	(Spain) ESP	Arnaldo Llabrés	1	0	0+1	0	0+0	0
