= 1985–86 Sporting de Gijón season =

Sporting de Gijón
1985–86 season
- Chairman: Manuel Vega-Arango
- Manager: José Manuel Díaz Novoa
- Stadium: El Molinón
- La Liga: 6th
- Copa del Rey: Third round
- Copa de la Liga: Quarterfinals
- Top goalscorer: Eloy (9)

The 1985–86 Sporting de Gijón season was the 25th season of the club in La Liga, the 11th consecutive after its last promotion.

== Squad ==
Note: Flags indicate national team as defined under FIFA eligibility rules; some limited exceptions apply. Players may hold more than one non-FIFA nationality.

No.	Pos.	Nation	Player
—	GK	ESP	Ablanedo II
—	GK	ESP	Isidro Fernández
—	GK	ESP	Pedro Rodríguez
—	DF	ESP	Tomás Orbegozo
—	DF	ESP	Esteban
—	DF	ESP	Manolo Jiménez
—	DF	ESP	Mino
—	DF	ESP	Cundi
—	DF	ESP	José Manuel Espinosa
—	DF	ESP	Andrés Bernal
—	DF	ESP	Ablanedo I
—	DF	ESP	Nicolás Pereda
—	DF	ESP	Tati
—	DF	ESP	Roberto
—	MF	ESP	Manuel Mesa

No.	Pos.	Nation	Player
—	MF	ESP	Emilio
—	MF	ESP	Joaquín
—	MF	ESP	Jaime
—	DF	ESP	Tino
—	DF	ESP	Alberto Bernardo
—	MF	ESP	Iñaki Eraña
—	MF	ESP	Marcelino
—	FW	ARG	Jorge Rinaldi
—	FW	ESP	Zurdi
—	FW	ESP	Arnaldo Llabrés
—	FW	ESP	Quini
—	FW	ESP	Joaquín Villa
—	FW	ESP	Luismi
—	FW	ESP	Eloy

== Competitions ==
=== La Liga ===
==== Results by round ====
Round	1	2	3	4	5	6	7	8	9	10	11	12	13	14	15	16	17	18	19	20	21	22	23	24	25	26	27	28	29	30	31	32	33	34
Ground	A	H	A	H	A	H	A	H	A	H	A	H	A	H	A	H	A	H	A	H	A	H	A	H	A	H	A	H	A	H	A	H	A	H
Result	W	D	D	W	D	W	D	D	W	W	D	W	L	D	W	L	D	W	L	D	D	D	W	D	D	L	L	W	W	D	D	W	L	W
Position	5	3	4	3	3	3	3	2	2	2	2	2	3	3	2	4	4	3	5	5	5	4	4	4	4	5	7	6	6	6	6	6	6	6

Source: BDFutbol
A = Away; H = Home; W = Win; D = Draw; L = Loss

==== League table ====
Pos	Team	Pld	W	D	L	GF	GA	GD	Pts	Qualification or relegation
4	Zaragoza	34	15	12	7	51	34	+17	42	Qualification for the Cup Winners' Cup first round (Note: Zaragoza qualified for the European Cup Winners' Cup as champions of the Copa del Rey.)
5	Atlético Madrid	34	17	8	9	53	38	+15	42	Qualification for the UEFA Cup first round
6	Sporting Gijón	34	13	15	6	37	27	+10	41	
7	Real Sociedad	34	17	5	12	64	51	+13	39	
8	Real Betis	34	11	13	10	40	40	0	35	

Source: BDFútbol
Rules for classification: 1) Points; 2) Head-to-head results; 3) Goal difference; 4) Number of goals scored

==== Matches ====
31 August 1985 1	Las Palmas	1–3	Real Sporting	Las Palmas
	Benito Morales 32'	Report	Quini 10', 31'; Mesa 85'	Stadium: Insular; Referee: Álvarez Margüenda

4 September 1985 2	Real Sporting	0–0	Real Sociedad	Gijón
		Report		Stadium: El Molinón; Referee: Lamo Castillo

8 September 1985 3	Real Betis	1–1	Real Sporting	Seville
	Gabino 37'	Report	Esteban 55'	Stadium: Benito Villamarín; Referee: Urío Velázquez

14 September 1985 4	Real Sporting	1–0	Valencia	Gijón
	Joaquín 23'	Report		Stadium: El Molinón; Referee: Enríquez Negreira

29 September 1985 5	Español	0–0	Real Sporting	Barcelona
		Report		Stadium: Sarrià; Referee: Guruceta Moreno

6 October 1985 6	Real Sporting	2–0	Racing Santander	Gijón
	Mino 64'; Joaquín 81'	Report	Tino (red card) 70'	Stadium: El Molinón; Referee: Andújar Oliver

12 October 1985 7	Zaragoza	0–0	Real Sporting	Zaragoza
		Report		Stadium: La Romareda; Referee: Socorro González

19 October 1985 8	Real Sporting	1–1	Atlético Madrid	Gijón
	Espinosa 69'	Report	Landaburu 4'	Stadium: El Molinón; Referee: Calvo Córdova

27 October 1985 9	Osasuna	1–2	Real Sporting	Pamplona
	Bustingorri 78' (pen.)	Report	Eloy 44', 58'	Stadium: El Sadar; Referee: Urizar Azpitarte

3 November 1985 10	Real Sporting	1–0	Athletic Bilbao	Gijón
	Joaquín 35'	Report		Stadium: El Molinón; Referee: Merino González

10 November 1985 11	Sevilla	0–0	Real Sporting	Seville
		Report		Stadium: Ramón Sánchez Pizjuán; Referee: Lamo Castillo

17 November 1985 12	Real Sporting	3–1	Hércules	Gijón
	Quini 25', 87'; Joaquín 75'	Report	Bakero 49'	Stadium: El Molinón; Referee: Miguel Pérez

23 November 1985 13	Barcelona	2–0	Real Sporting	Barcelona
	Clos 1'; Schuster 60'	Report		Stadium: Nou Camp; Referee: Sánchez Arminio

1 December 1985 14	Real Sporting	2–2	Cádiz	Gijón
	Esteban 40' (pen.); Eloy 76'	Report	Arica 46'; Amarillo 84'	Stadium: El Molinón; Referee: Peraita Ibáñez

7 December 1985 15	Valladolid	0–1	Real Sporting	Valladolid
		Report	Jaime 87'	Stadium: José Zorrilla; Referee: Soriano Aladrén

15 December 1985 16	Real Sporting	0–2	Real Madrid	Gijón
		Report	Butragueño 27'; Hugo Sánchez 65'	Stadium: El Molinón; Referee: Valdés Sánchez

22 December 1985 17	Celta	1–1	Real Sporting	Vigo
	Pichi Lucas 29'	Report	Joaquín 60'	Stadium: Balaídos; Referee: Álvarez Margüenda

21 December 1985 18	Real Sporting	1–0	Las Palmas	Gijón
	Esteban 89' (pen.)	Report	Contreras (red card) 89'	Stadium: El Molinón; Referee: Gómez Ramírez

5 January 1986 19	Real Sociedad	2–1	Real Sporting	San Sebastián
	Uralde 72'; Mujika 77'	Report	Esteban 62' (pen.)	Stadium: Atotxa; Referee: Calvo Córdova

12 January 1986 20	Real Sporting	0–0	Real Betis	Gijón
		Report		Stadium: El Molinón; Referee: Valdés Sánchez

18 January 1986 21	Valencia	1–1	Real Sporting	Valencia
	Cabrera 46'	Report	Quini 73'	Stadium: Luis Casanova; Referee: Jiménez Moreno

26 January 1986 22	Real Sporting	1–1	Español	Gijón
	Llabrés 48'	Report	Lauridsen (red card) 28'; Orejuela 78'	Stadium: El Molinón; Referee: Jiménez Muñoz

26 February 1986 23	Racing Santander	0–1	Real Sporting	Santander
		Report	Olaya 87'	Stadium: El Sardinero; Referee: Mazorra Freire

9 February 1986 24	Real Sporting	2–2	Zaragoza	Gijón
	Esteban 29' (pen.); Eloy 36'	Report	Señor 77' (pen.); Rubén Sosa 84'	Stadium: El Molinón; Referee: Franco Martínez

16 February 1986 25	Atlético Madrid	1–1	Real Sporting	Madrid
	Marina 1'	Report	Llabrés 37'	Stadium: Vicente Calderón; Referee: Pérez Sánchez

23 February 1986 26	Real Sporting	1–2	Osasuna	Gijón
	Eloy 28'	Report	Castañeda 24'; Enrique Martín 68'	Stadium: El Molinón; Referee: Casajuana Rifà

2 March 1986 27	Athletic Bilbao	2–0	Real Sporting	Bilbao
	Sarabia 45'; Dani 72'	Report		Stadium: San Mamés; Referee: García de Loza

9 March 1986 28	Real Sporting	2–1	Sevilla	Gijón
	Joaquín 48'; Eloy 87'	Report	José Luis 60'	Stadium: El Molinón; Referee: Miguel Pérez

16 March 1986 29	Hércules	0–1	Real Sporting	Alicante
		Report	Esteban 27'	Stadium: José Rico Pérez; Referee: Soriano Aladrén

23 March 1986 30	Real Sporting	1–1	Barcelona	Gijón
	Quini 75'	Report	Marcos Alonso 41'	Stadium: El Molinón; Referee: Socorro González

30 March 1986 31	Cádiz	0–0	Real Sporting	Cádiz
		Report		Stadium: Ramón de Carranza; Referee: Merino González

6 April 1986 32	Real Sporting	3–0	Valladolid	Gijón
	Joaquín 1', 42'; Quini 84'	Report	Minguela (yellow card) 61' (red card)	Stadium: El Molinón; Referee: Andújar Oliver

12 April 1986 33	Real Madrid	2–1	Real Sporting	Madrid
	Martín Vázquez 3'; Hugo Sánchez 49'	Report	Eloy 21'	Stadium: Santiago Bernabéu; Referee: Urío Velázquez

20 April 1986 34	Real Sporting	2–0	Celta	Gijón
	Eloy 42'; Cundi 52'	Report		Stadium: El Molinón; Referee: Martín Navarrete

=== Copa del Rey ===
==== Matches ====
13 November 1986 Third round First leg	Tenerife	2–0	Real Sporting	Heliodoro Rodríguez López
	Julio 24'; Lacalle 89'	Report		Stadium: Santa Cruz de Tenerife; Referee: Jiménez Moreno

13 November 1985 Third round Second leg	Real Sporting	2–1 (3–2 agg.)	Tenerife	Gijón
	Joaquín 59'; Quini 77'	Report	Cundo 3'	Stadium: El Molinón; Referee: Fernández Sánchez

=== Copa de la Liga ===
==== Matches ====
1 May 1986 First round First leg	Cádiz	0–1	Real Sporting	Cádiz
		Report	Joaquín 53'	Stadium: Ramón de Carranza; Referee: Urizar Azpitarte

8 May 1986 First round Second leg	Real Sporting	0–0 (1–0 agg.)	Cádiz	Gijón
		Report		Stadium: El Molinón; Referee: Benavente Garasa

24 May 1986 Quarterfinals; First leg	Barcelona	1–0	Real Sporting	Barcelona
	Esteban Vigo 37'	Report		Stadium: Nou Camp; Referee: Soriano Aladren

29 May 1986 Quarterfinals; Second leg	Real Sporting	2–2 (a.e.t.) (3–2 agg.)	Barcelona	Gijón
	Quini 20'; Joaquín 22'; Cundi (red card) 60'	Report	Amarilla (red card) 60'; Alexanko (yellow card) 70' (red card); Urbano 70'; Esteban Vigo 120'	Stadium: El Molinón; Referee: Merino González

=== UEFA Cup ===
==== Matches ====
18 September 1985 Round of 64; First leg	Köln (West Germany)	0–0	Real Sporting	Cologne
20:00		Summary		Stadium: Müngersdorfer Stadion; Referee: Lajos Németh (HUN)

2 October 1985 Round of 64; Second leg	Real Sporting	1–2 (1–2 agg.)	(West Germany) Köln	Gijón
20:30	Mino 2'	Summary	Engels 46'; Dickel 77'	Stadium: El Molinón; Referee: Franz Wöhrer (AUT)

== Squad statistics ==
=== Appearances and goals ===
No.	Pos	Nat	Player	Total		La Liga		Copa de la Liga		UEFA Cup	
No.	Pos	Nat	Player	Apps	Goals	Apps	Goals	Apps	Goals	Apps	Goals
	GK	(Spain) ESP	Ablanedo II	36	0	34+0	0	0+0	0	2+0	0
	GK	(Spain) ESP	Isidro Fernández	0	0	0+0	0	0+0	0	0+0	0
	GK	(Spain) ESP	Pedro Rodríguez	4	0	0+0	0	4+0	0	0+0	0
	DF	(Spain) ESP	Tomás Orbegozo	11	0	4+5	0	0+0	0	1+1	0
	DF	(Spain) ESP	Esteban	38	6	34+0	6	2+0	0	2+0	0
	DF	(Spain) ESP	Manolo Jiménez	40	0	34+0	0	4+0	0	2+0	0
	DF	(Spain) ESP	Mino	36	2	32+0	1	2+0	0	2+0	1
	DF	(Spain) ESP	Cundi	39	1	33+0	1	4+0	0	2+0	0
	DF	(Spain) ESP	José Manuel Espinosa	33	1	27+1	1	3+0	0	2+0	0
	DF	(Spain) ESP	Andrés Bernal	0	0	0+0	0	0+0	0	0+0	0
	DF	(Spain) ESP	Ablanedo I	13	0	9+0	0	4+0	0	0+0	0
	DF	(Spain) ESP	Nicolás Pereda	6	0	3+1	0	1+1	0	0+0	0
	DF	(Spain) ESP	Tati	1	0	0+0	0	1+0	0	0+0	0
	DF	(Spain) ESP	Roberto	1	0	0+0	0	0+1	0	0+0	0
	MF	(Spain) ESP	Manuel Mesa	30	1	20+4	1	4+0	0	2+0	0
	MF	(Spain) ESP	Emilio	2	0	2+0	0	0+0	0	0+0	0
	MF	(Spain) ESP	Joaquín	40	10	34+0	8	4+0	2	2+0	0
	MF	(Spain) ESP	Jaime	23	1	21+1	1	0+0	0	1+0	0
	MF	(Spain) ESP	Tino	9	0	4+4	0	0+1	0	0+0	0
	MF	(Spain) ESP	Alberto Bernardo	3	0	1+2	0	0+0	0	0+0	0
	MF	(Spain) ESP	Iñaki Eraña	0	0	0+0	0	0+0	0	0+0	0
	MF	(Spain) ESP	Marcelino	15	0	3+8	0	3+1	0	0+0	0
	FW	(Argentina) ARG	Jorge Rinaldi	9	0	3+4	0	0+0	0	1+1	0
	FW	(Spain) ESP	Zurdi	31	0	17+11	0	2+0	0	0+1	0
	FW	(Spain) ESP	Arnaldo Llabrés	26	2	14+9	2	2+1	0	0+0	0
	FW	(Spain) ESP	Quini	30	8	11+13	7	4+0	1	1+1	0
	FW	(Spain) ESP	Joaquín Villa	0	0	0+0	0	0+0	0	0+0	0
	FW	(Spain) ESP	Luismi	1	0	0+0	0	0+1	0	0+0	0
	FW	(Spain) ESP	Eloy	36	9	34+0	9	0+0	0	2+0	0
