= García Cuervo =

Spanish football player/manager

Personal information
- Full name: Carlos Manuel García Cuervo
- Date of birth: 24 September 1946 (age 80)
- Place of birth: Gijón, Spain
- Height: 1.74 m (5 ft 9 in)
- Position: Goalkeeper

Youth career
- La Calzada
- La Braña
- Sporting Gijón
- → La Camocha (loan)

Senior career*
Years	Team	Apps	(Gls)
1966–1972	Sporting Gijón	60	(0)
1972–1974	Burgos	25	(0)
1974–1975	Sabadell	5	(0)
1975–1976	Jaén		
1976–1978	Xerez		

Managerial career
- 1984–1985: San Martín
- 1986–1987: Caudal
- 1987–1989: Sporting Gijón B
- 1989–1990: Sporting Gijón
- 1992–1993: Avilés Industrial
- 1993: Sporting Gijón
- 1995: Sporting Gijón
- * Club domestic league appearances and goals

Carlos Manuel García Cuervo (born 24 September 1946), known as García Cuervo, is a Spanish retired footballer who played as a goalkeeper, and a manager.

== Football career ==
Born in Gijón, Asturias, García Cuervo represented CDFC La Calzada, La Braña CF, and SD La Camocha before finishing his formation with Sporting de Gijón. He made his first team debut on 30 January 1966, coming on as a first-half substitute in a 3–0 home win against Burgos CF.

García Cuervo became a first-choice during the 1967–68 season, but subsequently lost his starting spot to another youth graduate, Jesús Castro. Promoted to La Liga in 1970, he made his debut in the category on 27 September, starting in a 0–5 loss at Elche CF.

In July 1972, García Cuervo was transferred to fellow top tier side Burgos CF, but was only a backup during his two seasons at the club, the first ending in relegation. He subsequently featured rarely for CE Sabadell FC in the second division, before representing Tercera División sides Real Jaén and Xerez CD and retiring with the latter in 1978, aged 31.

=== Coaching career ===
García Cuervo's first managerial experience was in charge of CD San Martín in the fourth division during the 1984–85 campaign, with his side missing out promotion in the play-offs. After working for Caudal Deportivo and Sporting's reserves, he was named first team manager of the Rojiblancos in October 1989, replacing sacked Jesús Aranguren.

In May 1990, García Cuervo renewed with Sporting for a further season, but was himself sacked in November. In December 1992, after more than two years without a club, he took over Real Avilés CF in Segunda División B, but returned to Sporting the following April after replacing dismissed Bert Jacobs.

Ahead of the 1993–94 season, García Cuervo was named technical secretary while also being appointed director of the club's youth categories, Escuela de Fútbol de Mareo, with Mariano García Remón being appointed manager. On 9 March 1995, he replaced García Remón at the helm of the main squad, but was himself replaced in June by Ricardo Rezza, for the last round and the relegation play-offs; he subsequently returned to his previous role, but still terminated his contract on 9 July.
