= Quini =

Spanish footballer (1949 –2018)

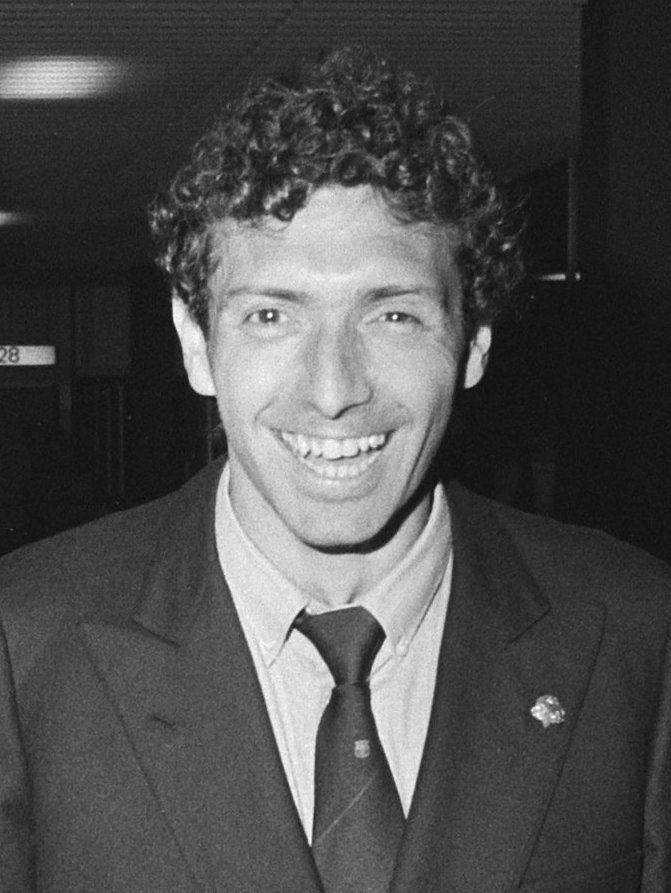
- Quini in 1983

Personal information
- Full name: Enrique Castro González
- Date of birth: 23 September 1949
- Place of birth: Oviedo, Spain
- Date of death: 27 February 2018 (aged 68)
- Place of death: Gijón, Spain
- Height: 1.76 m (5 ft 9 in)
- Position: Striker

Youth career
- Don Bosco
- Ensidesa

Senior career*
Years	Team	Apps	(Gls)
1967–1968	Ensidesa	22	(17)
1968–1980	Sporting Gijón	380	(214)
1980–1984	Barcelona	100	(53)
1984–1987	Sporting Gijón	61	(17)
Total		563	(301)

International career
1968	Spain U18	2	(0)
1971	Spain U23	2	(0)
1969–1972	Spain amateur	9	(11)
1970–1982	Spain	35	(8)
- * Club domestic league appearances and goals

Enrique Castro González (Spanish pronunciation: [enˈrike ˈkastɾo ɣonˈθaleθ]; (Note: In isolation, González is pronounced [ɡonˈθaleθ].) 23 September 1949 – 27 February 2018), known as Quini [ˈkini], was a Spanish professional footballer who played as a striker.

In a career totally connected with Sporting de Gijón and FC Barcelona, he was widely regarded as one of the country's best strikers, having won a total of seven Pichichi Trophy awards, five of those in La Liga.

A Spain international for 12 years, Quini represented the nation in two World Cups and one European Championship.

== Club career ==
Born in Oviedo, Asturias, Quini joined local Real Oviedo's neighbours Sporting de Gijón in 1968, from amateurs CD Ensidesa. In his first season in La Liga, 1970–71, he scored 13 goals in 30 games and, the following nine years, only netted once in single digits and won three Pichichi, one in Segunda División; ironically, in the year in which he won his second, Sporting were relegated, the player's 21 goals being insufficient to avoid last place.

In summer 1980, Quini signed with FC Barcelona, who had already tried to sign the player after Sporting's relegation. In his first two years he totalled 47 league goals, good enough for two more individual accolades. He also helped the Catalans to the 1981 Copa del Rey, netting twice to put away his beloved Sporting in a 3–1 win in the final. Additionally, in the 1981–82 European Cup Winners' Cup, he helped Barça come from behind to beat Belgium's Standard Liège 2–1 as the decisive match was held at the Camp Nou.

In his final two years, Quini appeared infrequently with Barcelona (but scored the club's 3,000th goal in the league, in a home match against CD Castellón), and chose to retire in 1984 at age 35, even being awarded a testimonial; however, he reconsidered and eventually returned to former side Sporting for three more years in the top flight, being sparingly used. On 14 June 1987, he played his last match, against Barcelona, and he totalled 448 games and 219 goals in the first division alone (ninth all-time).

Quini continued to serve Sporting in the following decades, in several directorial capacities.

=== Kidnapping ===
On 1 March 1981, after scoring twice for Barcelona in a 6–0 home victory over Hércules CF, Quini was kidnapped by two men at gunpoint, being forced into a van. After many developments and 25 days – during this time, Barcelona could only amass one draw in four games, eventually losing the title race – he was rescued unharmed, upon cooperation between the Spanish and Swiss law enforcement agencies.

It was subsequently speculated that Quini developed Stockholm syndrome, since he decided not to press charges against his kidnappers and never claimed his personal damages award of 5 million pesetas.

== International career ==
Quini made his debut for Spain on 28 October 1970, in a friendly in Zaragoza with Greece: having played the second half, he scored in a 2–1 win.

With a total of 35 caps and eight goals, Quini participated in two FIFA World Cups, 1978 and 1982, as well as UEFA Euro 1980. He could only find the net once in all those competitions (at Euro '80), and the nation suffered a 2–1 loss against Belgium.

== Personal life ==
Quini's younger brother, Jesús, was also a footballer. A goalkeeper, he too spent several years with Sporting. With 763 appearances between the siblings in La Liga, they ranked second in this reckoning behind Julio and Patxi Salinas at the time of their retirement.

In 2008, Quini overcame throat cancer. On 29 April 2016, the Town Hall of Gijón named him adoptive son of the city.

== Death ==
On 27 February 2018, Quini died at the age of 68 after suffering a heart attack. Just one day later, the City Council of Gijón agreed unanimously to rename El Molinón stadium as Estadio El Molinón-Enrique Castro "Quini" in his memory.

About 14,000 people attended Quini's funeral at his main club's homeground.

== Career statistics ==
=== Club ===
Appearances and goals by club, season and competition
Club	Season	League			Copa del Rey		Copa de la Liga		Europe		Other		Total	
Club	Season	Division	Apps	Goals	Apps	Goals	Apps	Goals	Apps	Goals	Apps	Goals	Apps	Goals
Ensidesa	1967–68	Tercera División	22	17	—		—		—		—		22	17
Sporting Gijón	1968–69	Segunda División	21	15	—		—		—		—		21	15
Sporting Gijón	1969–70	Segunda División	34	24	1	1	—		—		—		35	25
Sporting Gijón	1970–71	La Liga	30	13	2	0	—		—		—		32	13
Sporting Gijón	1971–72	La Liga	24	9	3	1	—		—		—		27	10
Sporting Gijón	1972–73	La Liga	34	11	8	5	—		—		—		42	16
Sporting Gijón	1973–74	La Liga	34	20	2	1	—		—		—		36	21
Sporting Gijón	1974–75	La Liga	32	12	6	3	—		—		—		38	15
Sporting Gijón	1975–76	La Liga	34	21	4	2	—		—		—		38	23
Sporting Gijón	1976–77	Segunda División	38	26	5	4	—		—		—		43	30
Sporting Gijón	1977–78	La Liga	32	15	10	9	—		—		—		42	24
Sporting Gijón	1978–79	La Liga	33	23	1	0	—		4 (Note: Appearances in UEFA Cup)	0	—		38	23
Sporting Gijón	1979–80	La Liga	34	25	9	3	—		2	0	—		45	28
Sporting Gijón	Total		380	214	51	29	—		6	0	—		437	243
Barcelona	1980–81	La Liga	30	20	9	9	—		2	1	—		41	30
Barcelona	1981–82	La Liga	32	26	2	0	—		8 (Note: Appearances in European Cup Winners' Cup)	3	—		42	29
Barcelona	1982–83	La Liga	22	4	2	0	1	0	2	0	2 (Note: Appearances in European Super Cup)	0	29	4
Barcelona	1983–84	La Liga	16	3	5	5	6	0	1	2	1 (Note: Appearance in Supercopa de España)	0	29	10
Barcelona	Total		100	53	18	14	7	0	13	6	3	0	141	73
Sporting Gijón	1984–85	La Liga	21	9	7	5	6	5	—		—		34	19
Sporting Gijón	1985–86	La Liga	24	7	3	3	4	1	2	0	—		33	11
Sporting Gijón	1986–87	La Liga	16	1	1	1	—		—		—		17	2
Sporting Gijón	Total		61	17	11	9	10	6	2	0	—		84	32
Career total			563	301	80	52	17	6	21	6	3	0	684	365

=== International ===
Scores and results list Spain's goal tally first, score column indicates score after each Quini goal.

List of international goals scored by Quini
No.	Date	Venue	Opponent	Score	Result	Competition
1	28 October 1970	La Romareda, Zaragoza, Spain	Greece	2–0	2–1	Friendly
2	20 November 1974	Hampden Park, Glasgow, Scotland	Scotland	1–1	2–1	UEFA Euro 1976 qualifying
3	20 November 1974	Hampden Park, Glasgow, Scotland	Scotland	2–1	2–1	UEFA Euro 1976 qualifying
4	29 March 1978	El Molinón, Gijón, Spain	Norway	1–0	3–0	Friendly
5	26 April 1978	Los Cármenes, Granada, Spain	Mexico	1–0	2–0	Friendly
6	16 April 1980	El Molinón, Gijón, Spain	Czechoslovakia	2–2	2–2	Friendly
7	15 June 1980	Giuseppe Meazza, Milan, Italy	Belgium	1–1	1–2	UEFA Euro 1980
8	24 February 1982	Luis Casanova, Valencia, Spain	Scotland	2–0	3–0	Friendly

== Honours ==
Sporting Gijón

- Segunda División: 1969–70, 1976–77

Barcelona

- Copa del Rey: 1980–81, 1982–83
- Supercopa de España: 1983
- Copa de la Liga: 1983
- UEFA Cup Winners Cup: 1981–82

Individual

- Don Balón Award: 1978–79
- Pichichi Trophy: 1973–74, 1975–76, 1979–80, 1980–81, 1981–82 (La Liga); 1969–70, 1976–77 (Segunda División)
- La Liga Team of The Year: 1980–81, 1981–82

== See also ==
- List of FC Barcelona players (100+ appearances)
- List of La Liga players (400+ appearances)
- List of Sporting de Gijón players (100+ appearances)
