= Román Galarraga =

Spanish footballer and manager (1921–2009)

Personal information
- Full name: Román Galarraga Salegui
- Date of birth: 9 August 1921
- Place of birth: Deba, Gipuzkoa, Spain
- Date of death: 22 February 2009 (aged 87)
- Place of death: Mendaro, Spain
- Position: Goalkeeper

Senior career*
Years	Team	Apps	(Gls)
1940–1941	SCD Durango		
1941–1942	CD Logroñés		
1942–1943	Real Madrid		
1943–1950	Real Sociedad		
1950–1955	Cultural y Deportiva Leonesa		

Managerial career
- 1953–1956: Cultural y Deportiva Leonesa
- 1956–1958: Real Avilés CF
- 1958–1959: Racing de Ferrol
- 1959–1960: CD Logroñés
- 1960–1963: Deportivo Alavés
- 1963–1964: Burgos CF
- 1964–1966: Real Sociedad
- 1966–1968: Sporting de Gijón
- 1969–1971: CD Logroñés
- 1971–1972: Burgos CF
- 1972–1974: Deportivo Alavés
- 1975–1976: CD Logroñés
Mayors of Deba
In office
1979–1983
- * Club domestic league appearances and goals

Román Galarraga Salegui (9 August 1921 – 22 February 2009) was a Spanish footballer who played as a goalkeeper for Real Madrid and Real Sociedad. He later worked as a manager, taking charge of several of CD Logroñés, Deportivo Alavés, and Real Sociedad.

In addition to football, he was also mayor of his native Deba from 1979 to 1983.

== Early life ==
Román Galarraga was born on 9 August 1921 in Deba, Gipuzkoa, and he began playing football for local teams, where he stood out as a forward, eventually having a contract to debut as a professional in Valencia in October 1936, aged just 15, but the outbreak of the Spanish Civil War prevented this, being mobilized in 1938, playing football in the matches organized among the recruits.

== Playing career ==
Upon his return from military service in 1940, Galarraga was signed by SCD Durango of the Tercera División, with whom he played for one season before being signed by fellow third division side CD Logroñés, where he made his debut against Real Unión on 22 March 1942, which ended in a 5–1 win, and then left just three months later, playing his last match against SD Indautxu on 7 June, which ended in a 1–4 loss in the semifinals of the Amateur Cup. At Logroñés, he quickly stood out from his teammates and caught the attention of several top teams, such as Real Sociedad and Real Madrid, being signed by the latter after a trial in the Spanish capital.

At Madrid, Galarraga served as a substitute for Gonzalo Marzá and Enrique Esquiva and never managed to make his official debut with the first team, so after a season, Sociedad requested Galarraga's loan to cover the loss of the injured Eduardo Chillida. Later the Txuri-Urdin club signed him permanently, becoming the club's starting goalkeeper until the 1947–48 season, when first Del Río and then Juan Bagur took his place in the starting eleven. Despite playing his last match for Sociedad in June 1948, he stayed loyal to the club for two more years until 1950, when he moved to Cultural y Deportiva Leonesa of the third division, where he played for five years until his retirement in 1955, becoming a player-coach from 1953 onwards. In total, Galarraga played 125 official matches for Sociedad with a balance of 51 wins, 27 draws, and 47 defeats; including 36 matches in La Liga, 26 in his first season and 10 in 1947–48.

== Managerial career ==
Galarraga began his managerial career in 1953 as a player-coach of Cultural, where he stood out for his bravery when it came to believing in youth footballers. In only his second season as coach, he led Cultural to the 1954–55 Segunda División title, thus achieving promotion to La Liga, although they were relegated back to Segunda right away, after which he left the club.

Galarraga continued his career as a coach in the second division on the benches of Real Avilés CF (1956–58) and Racing de Ferrol (1958–60), although he did not finish his second season with the Ferrolans, which ended in relegation to the third division. He then signed for Logroñés, making his debut as the club's coach in a league match against Vitoria on 24 January 1960, which ended in a 1–3 loss.

In the summer of 1960, Galarraga took charge of Deportivo Alavés (1960–63), in which he guided the club to promotion to the Second Division. In his second season, the club finished fourth and reached the round of 16 in the Copa del Rey after knocking out the likes of Cádiz and his former club Real Sociedad. In 1963, he signed for Burgos CF of the Second Division, a Castilian team with which he returned to Mendizorrotza Stadium on 6 October of that year.

Galarraga went on to coach Real Sociedad (1964–66), and Sporting de Gijón (1966–68), before returning to Logroñés in 1968. In his first season in Gijón, Galarraga's nearly achieved promotion to the first division, finishing second behind Real Sociedad and then losing in the playoffs to Sevilla FC, but he failed to bring this success into his second season, so he resigned and was replaced by Manuel Badás. In his first full season at Logroñés in 1969–70, the club won the third division with 62 points and achieved promotion to the Segunda, where they finished in 15th with 33 points. After brief second stints at Avilés (1971–72), Burgos (1972–73), and Alavés (1973–75), achieving another promotion to the second division with the latter, Galarraga returned to Logroñés for the third time, where he retired at the end of the 1975–76 season.

== Later life ==
In the first municipal elections of democracy in Spain (1979), Galarraga was elected mayor of his native Deva for the Basque Nationalist Party. Once the legislature was over he left the town hall. On 1 May 1985, the 64-year-old Galarraga took the kick-off in the match played by the Logroñés veterans in Las Gaunas, organized by Belaza.

== Death ==
Román Galarraga died in the hospital of Mendaro, Gipuzkoa, on 22 February 2009, at the age of 87. On the following day, both Sociedad and Cultural paid tribute to him with an emotional minute of silence before the start of their respective match, and as a sign of mourning, the Cultural players wore black armbands in his memory. His funeral took place on the following day in the church of Deba, the town of which he had been a mayor.

== Honours ==
Cultural y Deportiva Leonesa

- Segunda División: 1954–55

Deportivo Alavés

- Tercera División: 1961–62, 1972–73
