= 1981–82 FC Barcelona season =

83rd season in existence of FC Barcelona

FC Barcelona
1981–82 season
- President: Josep Lluís Núñez
- Manager: Udo Lattek
- La Liga: 2nd
- Copa del Rey: Round of 16
- Cup Winners' Cup: Winners
- Top goalscorer: League: Quini (26); All: Quini (29)

The 1981–82 season was the 83rd season for FC Barcelona.

== Squad ==
Note: Flags indicate national team as defined under FIFA eligibility rules; some limited exceptions apply. Players may hold more than one non-FIFA nationality.

No.	Pos.	Nation	Player
—	GK	ESP	Urruti
—	GK	ESP	Amador
—	GK	ESP	Pello Artola
—	DF	ESP	Migueli
—	DF	ESP	Pepito Ramos
—	DF	ESP	Gerardo
—	DF	ESP	Esteban Vigo
—	DF	ESP	Antonio Olmo
—	DF	ESP	José Ramón Alexanko
—	DF	ESP	Josep Moratalla
—	DF	ESP	Manolo
—	MF	ESP	Víctor
—	MF	ESP	Paco Martínez

No.	Pos.	Nation	Player
—	MF	ESP	Chus Landáburu
—	MF	GER	Bernd Schuster
—	MF	ESP	Juan José Estella
—	MF	ESP	Tente
—	FW	ESP	Marcos
—	FW	ARG	Rafael Zuviría
—	FW	ESP	Lobo Carrasco
—	FW	DEN	Allan Simonsen
—	FW	ESP	Enrique Morán
—	FW	ESP	Andrés Ramírez
—	FW	ESP	Quini

=== La Liga ===
==== League table ====
Pos	Team	Pld	W	D	L	GF	GA	GD	Pts	Qualification or relegation
1	Real Sociedad (C)	34	20	7	7	58	33	+25	47	Qualification for the European Cup first round
2	Barcelona	34	19	7	8	75	40	+35	45	Qualification for the Cup Winners' Cup first round (Note: Real Madrid qualified for the European Cup Winners' Cup by winning the Copa del Rey, while Barcelona for the tournament as title holders.)
3	Real Madrid	34	18	8	8	57	34	+23	44	Qualification for the Cup Winners' Cup first round
4	Athletic Bilbao	34	18	4	12	63	41	+22	40	Qualification for the UEFA Cup first round
5	Valencia	34	17	5	12	54	46	+8	39	Qualification for the UEFA Cup first round

Source: BDFútbol
Rules for classification: 1) Points; 2) Head-to-head results; 3) Goal difference; 4) Number of goals scored
(C) Champions

== Results ==
GAMES
4-8-1981 FRIENDLY DS'79-BARCELONA 0–3

7-8-1981 Teresa Herrera Trophy BARCELONA-DYNAMO KYIV 1–2

9-8-1981 Teresa Herrera Trophy DEPORTIVO-BARCELONA 0–5

13-8-1981 Trofeo Ciudad de Palma BARCELONA-BOAVISTA 4–1

15-8-1981 Trofeo Ciudad de Palma MALLORCA-BARCELONA 1–4

18-8-1981 Joan Gamper Trophy BARCELONA-VASCO DA GAMA 1–0

19-8-1981 Joan Gamper Trophy BARCELONA-KOLN 0–4

22-8-1981 Trofeo Colombino RECREATIVO-BARCELONA 1–2

23-8-1981 Trofeo Colombino ATHLETIC BILBAO-BARCELONA 2–1

1-9-1981 FRIENDLY BARCELONA-SELECT ARGENTINA 1–0

16-9-1981 Cup Win.Cup BARCELONA-TRAKIA PLOVDIV 4–1

20-9-1981 LIGA BARCELONA-CADIZ 4–0

26-9-1981 LIGA LAS PALMAS-BARCELONA 2–1

30-9-1981 Cup Win.Cup TRAKIA PLOVDIV-BARCELONA 1–0

3-10-1981 LIGA BARCELONA-SPORTING 1–0

7-10-1981 LIGA CASTELLON-BARCELONA 1–6

11-10-1981 LIGA VALLADOLID-BARCELONA 2–3

18-10-1981 LIGA BARCELONA-RACING 5–1

21-10-1981 Cup Win.Cup DUKLKA PRAGA-BARCELONA 1–0

25-10-1981 LIGA REAL SOCIEDAD-BARCELONA 1–1

31-10-1981 LIGA BARCELONA-ATLETICO DE MADRID 2–0

4-11-1981 Cup Win.Cup BARCELONA-DUKLKA PRAGA 4–0

8-11-1981 LIGA SEVILLA-BARCELONA 2–1

11-11-1981 LIGA BARCELONA-HERCULES 5–0

15-11-1981 LIGA ZARAGOZA-BARCELONA 2–2

22-11-1981 LIGA BARCELONA-VALENCIA 5–1

29-11-1981 LIGA ESPANYOL-BARCELONA 0–4

1-12-1981 FRIENDLY LLEIDA-BARCELONA 1–4

6-12-1981 LIGA BARCELONA-OSASUNA 2–0

13-12-1981 LIGA BILBAO-BARCELONA 1–1

20-12-1981 LIGA BARCELONA-REAL MADRID 3–1

22-12-1981 FRIENDLY TARRASA-BARCELONA 0–4

27-12-1981 LIGA BETIS-BARCELONA 2–0

3-1-1982 LIGA CADIZ-BARCELONA 1–0

10-1-1982 LIGA BARCELONA-LAS PALMAS 4–0

16-1-1982 LIGA SPORTING-BARCELONA 0–0

20-1-1982 COPA DEL REY ATLETICO MADRID-BARCELONA 1–0

24-1-1982 LIGA BARCELONA-CASTELLON 4–3

27-1-1982 COPA DEL REY BARCELONA-ATLETICO MADRID 0–0

31-1-1982 LIGA BARCELONA-VALLADOLID 3–1

7-2-1982 LIGA RACING-BARCELONA 0–1

14-2-1982 LIGA BARCELONA-REAL SOCIEDAD 2–0

21-2-1982 LIGA ATLETICO DE MADRID-BARCELONA 0–1

25-2-1982 FRIENDLY HOSPITALET-BARCELONA 1–3

28-2-1982 LIGA BARCELONA-SEVILLA 2–0

3-3-1982 Cup Win.Cup LOKOMOTIVE LEIPZIG-BARCELONA 0–3

8-3-1982 LIGA HERCULES-BARCELONA 2–2

12-3-1982 LIGA BARCELONA-ZARAGOZA 2–1

17-3-1982 Cup Win.Cup BARCELONA-LOKOMOTIVE LEIPZIG 1–2

21-3-1982 LIGA VALENCIA-BARCELONA 3–0

28-3-1982 LIGA BARCELONA-ESPANYOL 1–3

30-3-1982 FRIENDLY EUROPA-BARCELONA 0–4

4-4-1982 LIGA OSASUNA-BARCELONA 3–2

7-4-1982 Cup Win.Cup TOTTENHAM-BARCELONA 1–1

11-4-1982 LIGA BARCELONA-ATHLETIC BILBAO 2–2

18-4-1982 LIGA REAL MADRID-BARCELONA 3–1

21-4-1982 Cup Win.Cup BARCELONA-TOTTENHAM 1–0

25-4-1982 LIGA BARCELONA-BETIS 2–2

12-5-1982 Cup Win.Cup Final BARCELONA-STANDARD LIEGE 2–1

15-5-1982 FRIENDLY SELECT CHILE-BARCELONA 1–0

19-5-1982 FRIENDLY BARCELONA GUAYAQUIL-BARCELONA 0–1

28-5-1982 Copa Presidente de la Republica Venezuela PORTO-BARCELONA 2-2 /4-3/ PENALTY

31-5-1982 Copa Presidente de la Republica Venezuela REAL MADRID-BARCELONA 1–0
