= 1982–83 Copa del Rey =

81st Copa del Rey

Tournament details
- Country: Spain
- Dates: 8 September 1982 – 4 June 1983
- Teams: 135

Final positions
- Champions: FC Barcelona
- Runners-up: Real Madrid CF

Tournament statistics
- Matches played: 267
- Goals scored: 733 (2.75 per match)

The 1982–83 Copa del Rey was the 81st staging of the Spanish Cup, the annual domestic football cup competition in Spain. The tournament was attended by 135 teams from the higher echelons of Spanish football.

The tournament began on 8 September 1982 and ended on 4 June 1983 with the final, held in La Romareda Stadium in Zaragoza, in which FC Barcelona were crowned for the twentieth time in their history, after beating the defending champions of the tournament, Real Madrid CF by a score of 2–1.

This was the fourth time these two teams had met in the final, known as El Clásico, with a favourable balance for the Catalans.

== Format ==
Schedule
| Round | Fixture | Clubs | Gain entry |
|---|---|---|---|
| First round | 63 | 135 → 72 | All clubs participating gain entry |
| Second round | 33 | 72 → 39 | Athletic Bilbao, Real Betis (*) |
| Third round | 17 | 39 → 22 | |
| Fourth round | 6 | 22 → 16 | Sevilla FC (*) |
| Round Of 16 | 8 | 16 → 8 | FC Barcelona, Real Madrid CF, Real Sociedad, Valencia CF (*) |
| Quarter-finals | 4 | 8 → 4 | |
| Semi-finals | 2 | 4 → 2 | |
| Final | 1 | 2 → 1 | |

Teams
| Division | No. clubs |
|---|---|
| 1ª División | 18 |
| 2ª División | 20 |
| 2ª División B | 25 |
| 3ª División | 72 |
| Total teams | 135 |

- All rounds are played over two legs except the final which is played a single match in a neutral venue. The team that has the higher aggregate score over the two legs progresses to the next round.
- In case of a tie on aggregate, will play an extra time of 30 minutes, and if still tied, will be decided with a penalty shoot-outs.
- The teams that play European competitions are exempt until the round of 16 or when they are removed from the tournament.
- The winners of the competition will earn a place in the group stage of next season's UEFA Cup Winners' Cup, if they have not already qualified for European competition, if so then the runners-up will instead take this berth.

(*) Teams playing European competition.

== First round ==
First round
| Home 1st leg | Agg. | Home 2nd leg | 1st leg | | | 2nd leg | | | Notes |
|---|---|---|---|---|---|---|---|---|---|
| UD Toresana | 1–8 | Palencia CF | 8 Sep 1982 | 0–1 | | 15 Sep 1982 | 1–7 | | |
| CD Ourense | 0–3 | Celta de Vigo | 15 Sep 1982 | 0–2 | Rep. | 29 Sep 1982 | 0–1 | Rep. | |
| Santoña CF | 2–4 | Racing de Santander | 15 Sep 1982 | 2–2 | Rep. | 29 Sep 1982 | 0–2 | Rep. | |
| CD Tudelano | 0–4 | CA Osasuna | 15 Sep 1982 | 0–0 | Rep. | 22 Sep 1982 | 0–4 | Rep. | |
| Real Zaragoza | 7–0 | Osasuna Promesas | 15 Sep 1982 | 4–0 | Rep. | 29 Sep 1982 | 3–0 | Rep. | |
| FC Andorra | 1–3 | RCD Espanyol | 15 Sep 1982 | 1–1 | Rep. | 29 Sep 1982 | 0–2 | Rep. | |
| CP Cacereño | 3–5 (aet) | Atlético de Madrid | 15 Sep 1982 | 1–1 | Rep. | 22 Sep 1982 | 2–4 | Rep. | |
| Real Valladolid Promesas | 1–6 | UD Salamanca | 15 Sep 1982 | 1–1 | Rep. | 29 Sep 1982 | 0–5 | | |
| Atlético Bembibre | 2–9 | Real Valladolid Deportivo | 15 Sep 1982 | 1–3 | Rep. | 29 Sep 1982 | 1–6 | Rep. | |
| CD Antequerano | 1–4 | CD Málaga | 15 Sep 1982 | 0–0 | Rep. | 29 Sep 1982 | 1–4 | | |
| UD Telde | 1–12 | UD Las Palmas | 15 Sep 1982 | 1–3 | | 29 Sep 1982 | 0–9 | | |
| Deportivo de La Coruña | 7–1 | CD Lugo | 15 Sep 1982 | 3–0 | | 29 Sep 1982 | 4–1 | | |
| Club Europa de Nava | 3–4 | Real Oviedo CF | 15 Sep 1982 | 2–2 | | 29 Sep 1982 | 1–2 | | |
| Deportivo Alavés | 3–4 | Sestao SC | 15 Sep 1982 | 1–1 | | 29 Sep 1982 | 2–3 | | |
| CD Castellón | 1–2 | Levante UD | 15 Sep 1982 | 1–0 | | 29 Sep 1982 | 0–2 | | |
| CE Júpiter | 1–4 | CE Sabadell FC | 15 Sep 1982 | 1–0 | Rep. | 29 Sep 1982 | 0–4 | Rep. | |
| FC Barcelona Atlètic | 6–2 | CF Igualada | 15 Sep 1982 | 5–0 | Rep. | 29 Sep 1982 | 1–2 | Rep. | |
| Rayo Vallecano | 4–1 | Getafe Deportivo | 15 Sep 1982 | 2–1 | | 29 Sep 1982 | 2–0 | | |
| Hércules CF | 2–1 | Orihuela Deportiva CF | 15 Sep 1982 | 2–0 | | 29 Sep 1982 | 0–1 | | |
| Albacete Balompié | 2–3 | Real Murcia CF | 15 Sep 1982 | 2–0 | | 29 Sep 1982 | 0–3 | | |
| Elche CF | 7–2 | Alicante CF | 15 Sep 1982 | 6–1 | | 29 Sep 1982 | 1–1 | | |
| Cartagena CF | 4–3 | Torrevieja CF | 15 Sep 1982 | 4–0 | | 29 Sep 1982 | 0–3 | | |
| Racing Portuense | 0–4 | Recreativo de Huelva | 15 Sep 1982 | 0–1 | Rep. | 29 Sep 1982 | 0–3 | Rep. | |
| Algeciras CF | 1–0 | Córdoba CF | 15 Sep 1982 | 1–0 | Rep. | 22 Sep 1982 | 0–0 | Rep. | |
| Coria CF | 2–4 | Xerez CD | 15 Sep 1982 | 1–1 | Rep. | 29 Sep 1982 | 1–3 | Rep. | |
| Cádiz CF | 5–3 | Sevilla Atlético | 15 Sep 1982 | 2–0 | Rep. | 29 Sep 1982 | 3–3 | Rep. | |
| Linares CF | 5–2 | Atlético Benamiel | 15 Sep 1982 | 4–1 | | 29 Sep 1982 | 1–1 | | |
| UD Porreras | 0–4 | RCD Mallorca | 15 Sep 1982 | 0–2 | | 29 Sep 1982 | 0–2 | | |
| SD Eibar | 3–1 | Barakaldo CF | 15 Sep 1982 | 2–0 | | 22 Sep 1982 | 1–1 | Rep. | |
| SD Erandio | 2–1 | CD Baskonia | 15 Sep 1982 | 1–0 | | 28 Sep 1982 | 1–1 | | |
| Bilbao Athletic | 5–2 | Real Unión | 15 Sep 1982 | 4–1 | | 22 Sep 1982 | 1–1 | Rep. | |
| CD Binéfar | 1–3 | Endesa Andorra | 15 Sep 1982 | 0–1 | | 29 Sep 1982 | 1–2 | | |
| CD Logroñés | 3–2 | CD Corellano | 15 Sep 1982 | 2–1 | | 28 Sep 1982 | 1–0 | | |
| CD Alcoyano | 5–3 | Catarroja CF | 15 Sep 1982 | 3–3 | | 29 Sep 1982 | 2–1 | | |
| RSD Alcalá | 5–2 | CD Talavera | 15 Sep 1982 | 4–1 | | 22 Sep 1982 | 1–1 | Rep. | |
| Calvo Sotelo CF | 2–3 | Gimnástica Arandina | 15 Sep 1982 | 1–0 | | 29 Sep 1982 | 1–3 | | |
| CF Lorca Deportiva | 3–4 | CD Torre Pacheco | 15 Sep 1982 | 2–1 | | 29 Sep 1982 | 1–3 | | |
| Zamora CF | 0–2 | Burgos CF | 15 Sep 1982 | 0–2 | | 29 Sep 1982 | 0–0 | | |
| Jerez Industrial CF | 2–3 | AD Ceuta | 15 Sep 1982 | 0–0 | Rep. | 29 Sep 1982 | 2–3 | | |
| CD Fuengirola | 1–6 | Granada CF | 15 Sep 1982 | 1–3 | | 29 Sep 1982 | 0–3 | | |
| UD Poblense | 3–0 | CD Manacor | 15 Sep 1982 | 2–0 | | 29 Sep 1982 | 1–0 | | |
| UE Figueres | 3–1 | CE L'Hospitalet | 15 Sep 1982 | 2–1 | Rep. | 29 Sep 1982 | 0–1 | Rep. | |
| Club Turista | 1–4 | Pontevedra CF | 15 Sep 1982 | 1–1 | | 29 Sep 1982 | 3–0 | | |
| UP Langreo | 3–1 | Club Siero | 15 Sep 1982 | 2–1 | | 29 Sep 1982 | 1–0 | | |
| CD Aurrerá | 2–0 | SD Amorebieta | 15 Sep 1982 | 1–0 | | 29 Sep 1982 | 1–0 | | |
| CD Cayón | 2–4 | SD Deusto | 15 Sep 1982 | 2–2 | | 29 Sep 1982 | 0–2 | | |
| CD Numancia | 2–8 | Deportivo Aragón | 15 Sep 1982 | 1–3 | | 29 Sep 1982 | 1–5 | | |
| Ontinyent CF | 2–3 | CF Gandía | 15 Sep 1982 | 2–1 | | 29 Sep 1982 | 0–2 | | |
| CD Pegaso | 6–2 | CD Díter Zafra | 15 Sep 1982 | 4–0 | | 29 Sep 1982 | 2–2 | | |
| Mérida Industrial CF | 4–1 | CD Valdepeñas | 15 Sep 1982 | 3–1 | | 29 Sep 1982 | 1–0 | | |
| CD Eldense | 2–1 | CD Cieza | 15 Sep 1982 | 2–0 | | 29 Sep 1982 | 0–1 | | |
| CD Toreno | 1–3 | SD Ponferradina | 15 Sep 1982 | 1–0 | | 29 Sep 1982 | 0–3 | | |
| Atlético Malagueño | 3–5 | CD Alhaurino | 15 Sep 1982 | 3–2 | Rep. | 29 Sep 1982 | 0–3 | | |
| CD San Andrés | 6–6 (p) | UD Realejos | 15 Sep 1982 | 2–0 | | 29 Sep 1982 | 4–6 | | Penalties: 5–4 for CD San Andrés. |
| SD Tenisca | 3–4 | UD Güímar | 15 Sep 1982 | 2–0 | | 29 Sep 1982 | 1–4 | | |
| UD Orotava | 1–2 | CD Martos | 15 Sep 1982 | 0–1 | | 29 Sep 1982 | 1–1 | | |
| CD Mestalla | 3–1 | CD Constància | 15 Sep 1982 | 2–0 | | 29 Sep 1982 | 1–1 | | |
| Atlético Ciudadela | 4–2 | CF Sporting Mahonés | 15 Sep 1982 | 3–0 | | 29 Sep 1982 | 1–2 | | |
| Gran Peña Celtista | 5–4 | Arousa SC | 16 Sep 1982 | 3–1 | | 29 Sep 1982 | 2–3 | | |
| Real Titánico | 1–7 | Sporting de Gijón | 16 Sep 1982 | 1–3 | Rep. | 29 Sep 1982 | 0–4 | Rep. | |
| CF Badalona | 3–3 (p) | Barcelona Amateur | 16 Sep 1982 | 1–1 | Rep. | 29 Sep 1982 | 2–2 | Rep. | Penalties: 4–3 for CF Badalona. |
| Castilla CF | 4–1 | CD Leganés | 22 Sep 1982 | 3–1 | Rep. | 28 Sep 1982 | 1–0 | | |
| AD Parla | 1–2 | Atlético Madrileño | 22 Sep 1982 | 1–0 | Rep. | 29 Sep 1982 | 0–2 | | |
Bye by draw: CD Manchego, Athletic Bilbao, FC Barcelona, Real Betis, Real Madrid CF, Real Sociedad, Sevilla FC, Valencia CF.
Bye: Juventud Torremolinos CF, whose opponents, AD Almería, were dissolved.
Results of matches played: 15 September / 28 September / 29 September

== Second round ==
Second round
| Home 1st leg | Agg. | Home 2nd leg | 1st leg | | | 2nd leg | | | Notes |
|---|---|---|---|---|---|---|---|---|---|
| SD Deusto | 1–2 | SD Eibar | 12 Oct 1982 | 1–1 | | 3 Nov 1982 | 1–0 | | |
| UP Langreo | 3–4 | Sporting de Gijón | 19 Oct 1982 | 3–2 | Rep. | 3 Nov 1982 | 2–0 | Rep. | |
| Celta de Vigo | 2–1 | Pontevedra CF | 20 Oct 1982 | 1–1 | Rep. | 3 Nov 1982 | 0–1 | Rep. | |
| Sestao SC | 0–1 | Athletic Bilbao | 20 Oct 1982 | 0–1 | Rep. | 3 Nov 1982 | 0–0 | Rep. | |
| Mérida Industrial CF | 0–3 | Atlético de Madrid | 20 Oct 1982 | 0–2 | Rep. | 3 Nov 1982 | 1–0 | Rep. | |
| UD Salamanca | 3–2 | Burgos CF | 20 Oct 1982 | 3–0 | Rep. | 3 Nov 1982 | 2–0 | Rep. | |
| CD Alhaurino | 0–5 | CD Málaga | 20 Oct 1982 | 0–1 | Rep. | 3 Nov 1982 | 4–0 | Rep. | |
| CD San Andrés | 1–10 | UD Las Palmas | 20 Oct 1982 | 0–3 | Rep. | 3 Nov 1982 | 7–1 | Rep. | |
| Deportivo de La Coruña | 7–0 | Gran Peña Celtista | 20 Oct 1982 | 6–0 | Rep. | 2 Nov 1982 | 0–1 | Rep. | |
| Real Oviedo CF | 4–2 | Bilbao Athletic | 20 Oct 1982 | 2–1 | Rep. | 4 Nov 1982 | 1–2 | Rep. | |
| CE Sabadell FC | 2–3 | UE Figueres | 20 Oct 1982 | 2–0 | Rep. | 3 Nov 1982 | 3–0 | Rep. | |
| CF Badalona | 0–4 | FC Barcelona Atlètic | 20 Oct 1982 | 0–2 | Rep. | 3 Nov 1982 | 2–0 | Rep. | |
| CD Manchego | 2–1 | Castilla CF | 20 Oct 1982 | 2–0 | Rep. | 27 Oct 1982 | 1–0 | Rep. | |
| Rayo Vallecano | 5–1 | CD Pegaso | 20 Oct 1982 | 3–0 | Rep. | 3 Nov 1982 | 1–2 | Rep. | |
| RSD Alcalá | 3–2 | Atlético Madrileño | 20 Oct 1982 | 3–1 | Rep. | 3 Nov 1982 | 1–0 | Rep. | |
| Gimnástica Arandina | 1–4 | Palencia CF | 20 Oct 1982 | 0–2 | Rep. | 3 Nov 1982 | 2–1 | | |
| Jerez Industrial CF | 0–1 | Cádiz CF | 20 Oct 1982 | 0–1 | Rep. | 3 Nov 1982 | 0–0 | Rep. | |
| Algeciras CF | 2–3 | Recreativo de Huelva | 20 Oct 1982 | 2–1 | Rep. | 3 Nov 1982 | 2–0 | Rep. | |
| Granada CF | 2–3 | Linares CF | 20 Oct 1982 | 2–1 | Rep. | 3 Nov 1982 | 2–0 | Rep. | |
| Juventud Torremolinos CF | 0–4 | Xerez CD | 20 Oct 1982 | 0–1 | Rep. | 3 Nov 1982 | 3–0 | Rep. | |
| UD Poblense | 1–5 | RCD Mallorca | 20 Oct 1982 | 0–0 | Rep. | 3 Nov 1982 | 5–1 | Rep. | |
| Endesa Andorra | 2–5 | Deportivo Aragón | 20 Oct 1982 | 2–2 | Rep. | 3 Nov 1982 | 3–0 | Rep. | |
| Hércules CF | 6–1 | CD Mestalla | 26 Oct 1982 | 1–0 | Rep. | 3 Nov 1982 | 1–5 | Rep. | (*) |
| Real Murcia CF | 3–1 | CD Torre Pacheco | 26 Oct 1982 | 2–0 | Rep. | 3 Nov 1982 | 1–1 | Rep. | (*) |
| CF Gandía | 1–3 | Elche CF | 26 Oct 1982 | 1–1 | Rep. | 3 Nov 1982 | 2–0 | Rep. | (*) |
| CD Eldense | 1–0 | Cartagena FC | 26 Oct 1982 | 1–0 | Rep. | 3 Nov 1982 | 0–0 | Rep. | (*) |
| SD Erandio | 1–0 | Racing de Santander | 27 Oct 1982 | 1–0 | Rep. | 3 Nov 1982 | 0–0 | Rep. | |
| Levante UD | 0–1 | CD Alcoyano | 28 Oct 1982 | 0–0 | Rep. | 3 Nov 1982 | 1–0 | | Match scheduled for 21 Oct, but played on 28 Oct due to rainstorm. |
| Atlético Ciudadela | 0–13 | RCD Espanyol | 12 Oct 1982 | 0–7 | Rep. | 26 Oct 1982 | 6–0 | Rep. | |
| CD Aurrerá | 2–6 | CA Osasuna | 12 Oct 1982 | 2–3 | Rep. | 4 Nov 1982 | 3–0 | Rep. | Match scheduled for 3 Nov, but played on 4 Nov due to electrical fault. |
| CD Logroñés | 2–2 (p) | Real Zaragoza | 12 Oct 1982 | 1–2 | Rep. | 26 Oct 1982 | 0–1 | Rep. | Penalties: 1–3 for CD Logroñés. |
| CD Martos | 0–5 | Real Betis | 12 Oct 1982 | 0–1 | Rep. | 3 Nov 1982 | 4–0 | Rep. | |
| SD Ponferradina | 1–2 | Real Valladolid Deportivo | 12 Oct 1982 | 1–0 | Rep. | 20 Oct 1982 | 2–0 | Rep. | |
Bye: UD Güímar, FC Barcelona, Real Madrid CF, Real Sociedad, Sevilla FC, Valencia CF.
Results of matches played: 3 November
(*) Match scheduled for 20 Oct, but played on 26 Oct due to a rainstorm in area of the Levante.

== Third round ==
Third round
| Home 1st leg | Agg. | Home 2nd leg | 1st leg | | | 2nd leg | | | Notes |
|---|---|---|---|---|---|---|---|---|---|
| RSD Alcalá | 3–4 | Real Betis | 24 Nov 1982 | 1–0 | Rep. | 8 Dec 1982 | 4–2 | Rep. | |
| Atlético de Madrid | 2–4 | RCD Mallorca | 24 Nov 1982 | 1–2 | Rep. | 8 Dec 1982 | 2–1 | Rep. | |
| SD Eibar | 2–6 (aet) | Elche CF | 24 Nov 1982 | 2–0 | Rep. | 8 Dec 1982 | 6–0 | Rep. | |
| SD Erandio | 2–4 | Rayo Vallecano | 24 Nov 1982 | 2–1 | Rep. | 8 Dec 1982 | 3–0 | Rep. | |
| RCD Espanyol | 4–0 | Deportivo Aragón | 24 Nov 1982 | 3–0 | Rep. | 8 Dec 1982 | 0–1 | Rep. | |
| UE Figueres | 3–4 | Real Valladolid Deportivo | 24 Nov 1982 | 1–1 | Rep. | 8 Dec 1982 | 3–2 | Rep. | Match suspended due to a fan attacking the referee (1st leg–half time). |
| UD Güímar | 0–9 | Celta de Vigo | 1 Dec 1982 | 0–3 | Rep. | 8 Dec 1982 | 6–0 | Rep. | |
| Xerez CD | 3–7 | CD Málaga | 24 Nov 1982 | 3–2 | Rep. | 8 Dec 1982 | 5–0 | Rep. | |
| Hércules CF | 3–2 (aet) | CD Eldense | 24 Nov 1982 | 1–0 | Rep. | 8 Dec 1982 | 2–2 | Rep. | |
| Linares CF | 0–7 | Athletic Bilbao | 24 Nov 1982 | 0–1 | Rep. | 8 Dec 1982 | 6–0 | Rep. | |
| CD Logroñés | 1–2 | CA Osasuna | 24 Nov 1982 | 1–1 | Rep. | 8 Dec 1982 | 1–0 | Rep. | |
| Real Murcia CF | 0–3 | Sporting de Gijón | 24 Nov 1982 | 0–0 | Rep. | 8 Dec 1982 | 3–0 | Rep. | |
| Real Oviedo CF | 2–2 (p) | CD Alcoyano | 24 Nov 1982 | 2–1 | Rep. | 8 Dec 1982 | 1–0 | Rep. | Penalties: 4–3 for CD Alcoyano. |
| UD Las Palmas | 0–1 | Cádiz CF | 24 Nov 1982 | 0–0 | Rep. | 8 Dec 1982 | 1–0 | Rep. | |
| Palencia CF | 2–6 | Deportivo de La Coruña | 24 Nov 1982 | 2–3 | Rep. | 8 Dec 1982 | 3–0 | Rep. | |
| Recreativo de Huelva | 4–3 | CD Manchego | 24 Nov 1982 | 2–2 | Rep. | 8 Dec 1982 | 1–2 | Rep. | |
| UD Salamanca | 2–2 (p) | FC Barcelona Atlètic | 24 Nov 1982 | 1–1 | Rep. | 8 Dec 1982 | 1–1 | Rep. | Penalties: 2–4 for UD Salamanca. |
Bye: FC Barcelona, Real Madrid CF, Real Sociedad, Sevilla FC, Valencia CF.

== Fourth round ==
Fourth round
| Home 1st leg | Agg. | Home 2nd leg | 1st leg | | | 2nd leg | | | Notes |
|---|---|---|---|---|---|---|---|---|---|
| CD Alcoyano | 3–4 | Deportivo de La Coruña | 22 Dec 1982 | 3–1 | Rep. | 12 Jan 1983 | 3–0 | Rep. | |
| Real Betis | 3–2 | CD Málaga | 22 Dec 1982 | 2–2 | Rep. | 12 Jan 1983 | 0–1 | Rep. | |
| Celta de Vigo | 4–3 | Recreativo de Huelva | 22 Dec 1982 | 2–2 | Rep. | 12 Jan 1983 | 1–2 | Rep. | |
| Hércules CF | 1–3 | Sporting de Gijón | 22 Dec 1982 | 0–2 | Rep. | 12 Jan 1983 | 1–1 | Rep. | |
| RCD Mallorca | 2–3 | Sevilla FC | 22 Dec 1982 | 1–0 | Rep. | 12 Jan 1983 | 3–1 | Rep. | |
| Real Valladolid Deportivo | 2–1 | Elche CF | 22 Dec 1982 | 1–0 | Rep. | 12 Jan 1983 | 1–1 | Rep. | |
Bye: Rayo Vallecano, Athletic Bilbao, CA Osasuna, Cádiz CF, RCD Espanyol, UD Salamanca, FC Barcelona, Real Madrid CF, Real Sociedad, Valencia CF.

== Bracket ==
Round of 16
1 | Cádiz CF | 0 | 1 | 1
16 | Real Madrid CF | 0 | 4 | 4
8 | Sevilla FC | 2 | 2 | 4
9 | Real Betis | 0 | 0 | 0
5 | Valencia CF | 1 | 2 | 3
12 | RCD Espanyol | 2 | 2 | 4
4 | CA Osasuna | 0 | 2 | 2
13 | Sporting de Gijón | 0 | 4 | 4
6 | Deportivo de La Coruña | 0 | 1 | 1
11 | Athletic de Bilbao | 0 | 3 | 3
3 | Celta de Vigo | 0 | 0 | 0
14 | FC Barcelona | 0 | 2 | 2
7 | Real Valladolid Deportivo | 2 | 1 | 3
10 | Rayo Vallecano | 0 | 1 | 1
2 | Real Sociedad (3–4 p) | 2 | 0 | 2
15 | UD Salamanca | 0 | 2 | 2

Quarter-finals
Real Madrid CF | 2 | 2 | 4
Sevilla FC | 1 | 1 | 2
RCD Espanyol | 1 | 0 | 1
Sporting de Gijón | 0 | 5 | 5
Athletic Bilbao | 1 | 0 | 1
FC Barcelona | 0 | 3 | 3
Real Valladolid Deportivo | 1 | 0 | 1
Real Sociedad | 0 | 3 | 3

Semi-finals
Real Madrid CF | 6 | 0 | 6
Sporting de Gijón | 0 | 4 | 4
FC Barcelona | 2 | 2 | 4
Real Sociedad | 0 | 1 | 1

Final
Real Madrid CF | 1
FC Barcelona | 2

== Round of 16 ==
| Team 1 | Agg. | Team 2 | 1st leg | 2nd leg |
|---|---|---|---|---|
| Cádiz | 1–4 (aet) | Real Madrid | 0–0 | 1–4 |
| Sevilla | 4–0 | Betis | 2–0 | 2–0 |
| Valencia | 3–4 | Español | 1–2 | 2–2 |
| Osasuna | 2–4 | Sporting de Gijón | 0–0 | 2–4 |
| Deportivo de La Coruña | 1–3 | Athletic Bilbao | 0–0 | 1–3 |
| Celta | 0–2 | Barcelona | 0–0 | 0–2 |
| Valladolid | 3–1 | Rayo Vallecano | 2–0 | 1–1 |
| Real Sociedad | 2–2 (4–3 p) | Salamanca | 2–0 | 0–2 |

=== First leg ===
| 2 February 1983 | Real Sociedad | 2–0 | UD Salamanca | San Sebastián |
| 20:00 CET | Uralde 9', 11' | Report (in Spanish) | | Stadium: Atocha; Referee: Andújar Oliver |

| 2 February 1983 | CA Osasuna | 0–0 | Sporting de Gijón | Pamplona |
| 20:30 CET | | Report (in Spanish) | | Stadium: El Sadar; Referee: García de Loza |

| 2 February 1983 | Real Valladolid | 2–0 | Rayo Vallecano | Valladolid |
| 20:30 CET | Minguela 31'; Rusky 71' | Report (in Spanish) | | Stadium: Nuevo José Zorrilla; Referee: Miguel Pérez |

| 2 February 1983 | Deportivo de La Coruña | 0–0 | Athletic Bilbao | A Coruña |
| 20:30 CET | | Report (in Spanish) | | Stadium: Estadio Riazor; Referee: Ramos Marcos |

| 2 February 1983 | Celta Vigo | 0–0 | FC Barcelona | Vigo |
| 20:30 CET | | Report (in Spanish) | | Stadium: Balaídos; Attendance: 20,000; Referee: Martín Navarrete |

| 2 February 1983 | Valencia CF | 1–2 | RCD Español | Valencia |
| 21:00 CET | Márquez 15' (o.g.) | Report (in Spanish) | Márquez 75'; Orejuela 76' | Stadium: Luís Casanova; Referee: Jiménez Madrid |

| 2 February 1983 | Sevilla FC | 2–0 | Real Betis | Seville |
| 21:00 CET | Serna 29'; Santi 65' | Report (in Spanish) | | Stadium: Ramón Sánchez Pizjuán; Referee: Urío Velázquez |

| 2 February 1983 | Cádiz CF | 0–0 | Real Madrid CF | Cádiz |
| 21:00 CET | | Report (in Spanish) | | Stadium: Ramón de Carranza; Referee: Marín López |

=== Second leg ===
| 22 February 1983 | FC Barcelona | 2–0 | Celta Vigo | Barcelona |
| 20:45 CET | Perico Alonso 23'; Schuster 38' | Report (in Spanish) | | Stadium: Camp Nou; Attendance: 20,000; Referee: Urízar Azpitarte |

| 22 February 1983 | Real Madrid | 4–1 (a.e.t.) | Cádiz CF | Madrid |
| 21:00 CET | Santillana 17', 100'; San José 96'; Stielike 108' (pen.) | Report (in Spanish) | Mejías 3' | Stadium: Santiago Bernabéu; Referee: Merino González |

| 23 February 1983 | Athletic Bilbao | 3–1 | Deportivo de La Coruña | Bilbao |
| 20:00 CET | Julio Salinas 42'; Noriega 48', 61' | Report (in Spanish) | José Luis 53' | Stadium: San Mamés; Attendance: 30,000; Referee: Crespo Aurré |

| 23 February 1983 | Sporting de Gijón | 4–2 | CA Osasuna | Gijón |
| 20:15 CET | Ferrero 13'; Maceda 57'; Abel 72'; Savić 87' | Report (in Spanish) | Bayona 3'; Purroy 22' | Stadium: El Molinón; Referee: Valdés Sánchez |

| 23 February 1983 | Rayo Vallecano | 1–1 | Real Valladolid | Madrid |
| 20:30 CET | Pariente 9' | Report (in Spanish) | Minguela 88' | Stadium: Vallecas; Referee: Borrás Del Barrio |

| 23 February 1983 | UD Salamanca | 2–0 (a.e.t.) (3–4 p) | Real Sociedad | Villares de la Reina |
| 20:30 CET | Pérez Aguerri 75' (pen.); Brizzola 81' | Report (in Spanish) | | Stadium: El Helmántico; Attendance: 13,000; Referee: Jaramillo González |
| | Penalties |
| | Tomé (penalty scored); Villacreces (penalty scored); Pérez Aguerri (penalty scored); Brizzola (penalty missed); Abajo (penalty missed) | | (penalty scored) Uralde; (penalty scored) Larrañaga; (penalty scored) Celayeta; (penalty scored) Zamora; (penalty missed) Zubillaga |

| 23 February 1983 | RCD Español | 2–2 | Valencia CF | Barcelona |
| 20:45 CET | Zúñiga 51'; Giménez 63' | Report (in Spanish) | Felman 14'; Welzl 56' | Stadium: Sarrià; Referee: Díez Frías |

| 23 February 1983 | Real Betis | 0–2 | Sevilla FC | Sevilla |
| 21:00 CET | | Report (in Spanish) | Francisco 67' | Stadium: Benito Villamarín; Referee: Urío Velázquez |

== Quarter-finals ==
| Team 1 | Agg. | Team 2 | 1st leg | 2nd leg |
|---|---|---|---|---|
| Real Madrid | 4–2 | Sevilla | 2–1 | 2–1 |
| Español | 1–5 | Sporting de Gijón | 1–0 | 0–5 |
| Athletic Bilbao | 1–3 | Barcelona | 1–0 | 0–3 |
| Valladolid | 1–3 | Real Sociedad | 1–0 | 0–3 |

=== First leg ===
| 30 March 1983 | Athletic Bilbao | 1–0 | FC Barcelona | Bilbao |
| 20:30 CET | Dani 69' (pen.) | Report (in Spanish) | | Stadium: San Mamés; Attendance: 45,000; Referee: Franco Martínez |

| 30 March 1983 | Real Valladolid | 1–0 | Real Sociedad | Valladolid |
| 20:30 CET | Joaquín 90' | Report (in Spanish) | | Stadium: Nuevo José Zorrilla; Referee: Díez Frías |

| 30 March 1983 | RCD Español | 1–0 | Sporting de Gijón | Barcelona |
| 20:45 CET | Giménez 6' | Report (in Spanish) | | Stadium: Sarrià; Referee: García de Loza |

| 30 March 1983 | Real Madrid CF | 2–1 | Sevilla FC | Madrid |
| 21:00 CET | Metgod 51'; Gallego 52' | Report (in Spanish) | López 74' | Stadium: Santiago Bernabéu; Referee: García Carrión |

=== Second leg ===
| 13 April 1983 | Real Sociedad | 3–0 | Real Valladolid | San Sebastián |
| 20:00 CET | Larrañaga 32'; Uralde 34'; Bakero 90' | Report (in Spanish) | | Stadium: Atocha; Referee: Enríquez Negreira |

| 13 April 1983 | Sporting de Gijón | 5–0 | RCD Español | Gijón |
| 20:30 CET | Maceda 20'; Savić 36', 88'; Ferrero 66'; Joaquín 83' | Report (in Spanish) | | Stadium: El Molinón; Referee: Urízar Azpitarte |

| 13 April 1983 | FC Barcelona | 3–0 | Athletic Bilbao | Barcelona |
| 20:30 CET | Carrasco 1'; Perico Alonso 69'; Maradona 88' | Report (in Spanish) | | Stadium: Camp Nou; Referee: García Carrión |

| 13 April 1983 | Sevilla FC | 1–2 | Real Madrid CF | Seville |
| 21:00 CET | Francisco 47' | Report (in Spanish) | Santillana 39', 77' | Stadium: Ramón Sánchez Pizjuán; Referee: Jiménez Madrid |

== Semi-finals ==
| Team 1 | Agg. | Team 2 | 1st leg | 2nd leg |
|---|---|---|---|---|
| Real Madrid | 6–4 | Sporting de Gijón | 6–0 | 0–4 |
| Barcelona | 4–1 | Real Sociedad | 2–0 | 2–1 |

=== First leg ===
| 4 May 1983 | Real Madrid CF | 6–0 | Sporting de Gijón | Madrid |
| 21:00 CET | Santillana 10', 29', 53'; Isidro 11'; San José 55'; Juanito 65' | Report (in Spanish) | | Stadium: Santiago Bernabéu; Referee: Andújar Oliver |

| 7 May 1983 | FC Barcelona | 2–0 | Real Sociedad | Barcelona |
| 21:00 CET | Víctor 20'; Maradona 58' | Report (in Spanish) | | Stadium: Camp Nou; Referee: Soriano Aladrén |

=== Second leg ===
| 21 May 1983 | Sporting de Gijón | 4–0 | Real Madrid CF | Gijón |
| 19:45 CET | Cundi 8'; Mesa 10', 34'; Ferrero 54' (pen.) | Report (in Spanish) | | Stadium: El Molinón; Referee: Miguel Pérez |

| 21 May 1983 | Real Sociedad | 1–2 | FC Barcelona | San Sebastián |
| 20:00 CET | Uralde 57' | Report (in Spanish) | Marcos 60'; Maradona 78' | Stadium: Atocha; Referee: García de Loza |

== Final ==
4 June 1983
22:15 CET

| Real Madrid CF | 1–2 | FC Barcelona |
|---|---|---|
| Santillana 50' | Report (in Spanish) | Víctor 32'; Marcos 90' |

La Romareda, Zaragoza
Attendance: 35,000
Referee: García Carrión

Copa del Rey
1982–83 winners
FC Barcelona
20th title
