= Karl Orth =

Austrian football manager

- Born: Karl Orth; Wien, Austria
- Died: 16 December 1973 (aged 90); Madrid, Spain
- Citizenship: Spanish
- Occupation: Football manager
- Known for: Manager of Sporting de Gijón
Association football career
- Full name: Karl Orth
Managerial career
- Years: Team
- –1921: Berna FC
- 1921–1923: Sporting de Gijón
- Wiener AFC

Karl Orth (11 March 1883 – 16 December 1973) was an Austrian football manager who led Sporting de Gijón between 1921 and 1924, becoming the first professional coach in the club's history.

== Career ==
At some point, Orth became the coach of Berna FC, a Swiss team that, in 1921, played some friendly matches against Sporting de Gijón, whose newly elected president Ismael Figaredo Herrero had studied in Belgium and thus spoke French perfectly, so he asked Orth, who also spoke French, to stay and coach Sporting, personally leading the negotiations to sign him by offering him the same amount of money that he earned in Switzerland. Orth had previously held positions as a player and masseuse in other squads. The only issue was the communication between the coach and the squad, since Orth did not speak a word of Spanish, but that was solved by providing him with a translator, the team delegate, Diego Orbón Cervero, who had studied in France, being always present in the training sessions and matches.

Orth stayed two seasons in Gijón, from 1921 to 1923, leading the club to Asturian regional championship on both occasions. He also served as an advisor to the Asturian team that won the 1922–23 Prince of Asturias Cup, beating Galicia 3–1 in the final. He also provided tactical innovations such as playing with an advanced central defender, which served both for defensive and attacking duties, and in which the midfielders, instead of simply being mere links between back and front, should also carry out defensive work.

After leaving Asturias, he returned to his native Vienna to coach for five seasons what would be his last club before his final retirement from football: Wiener AFC.

== Honours ==
Sporting de Gijón

- Asturian Championship
  - Champions (2): 1921–22 and 1922–23
