= 1969–70 Segunda División =

39th season of the second-tier football league in Spain

Segunda División
- Season: 1969–70
- Champions: Real Gijón
- Promoted: Real Gijón; Málaga; Español
- Relegated: Bilbao Atlético; Osasuna; Ilicitano; Valladolid; Murcia; Salamanca; Orense
- Matches: 380
- Goals: 864 (2.27 per match)
- Top goalscorer: Quini (21 goals)
- Best goalkeeper: Francisco Romero (0.69 goals/match)
- Biggest home win: Español 7–0 Ilicitano (31 May 1970)
- Biggest away win: Ilicitano 2–7 Real Gijón (29 March 1970)
- Highest scoring: Ilicitano 2–7 Real Gijón (29 March 1970)

The 1969–70 Segunda División season was the 39th since its establishment and was played between 6 September 1969 and 7 June 1970.

== Overview before the season ==
20 teams joined the league, including 3 relegated from the 1968–69 La Liga and 6 promoted from the 1968–69 Tercera División.

Relegated from La Liga

- Málaga
- Español
- Córdoba

Promoted from Tercera División

- Orense
- Bilbao Atlético
- Osasuna
- San Andrés
- Castellón
- Salamanca

== Teams ==
Location of teams in Segunda División 1969-70

Club	City	Stadium
Real Betis	Seville	Benito Villamarín
Bilbao Atlético	Bilbao	San Mamés
Burgos CF	Burgos	El Plantío
CF Calvo Sotelo	Puertollano	Calvo Sotelo
CD Castellón	Castellón de la Plana	Castalia
Córdoba CF	Córdoba	El Árcangel
RCD Español	Barcelona	Sarrià
Club Ferrol	Ferrol	Manuel Rivera
Real Gijón	Gijón	El Molinón
CD Ilicitano	Elche	Altabix
CD Málaga	Málaga	La Rosaleda
Real Murcia	Murcia	La Condomina
Onteniente CF	Ontinyent	El Clariano
CD Orense	Ourense	O Couto
CA Osasuna	Pamplona	El Sadar
Real Oviedo	Oviedo	Carlos Tartiere
Rayo Vallecano	Madrid	Vallecas
UD Salamanca	Salamanca	El Calvario / Helmántico
CD San Andrés	Barcelona	Sarrià / San Andrés
Real Valladolid	Valladolid	José Zorrilla

== League table ==
Pos	Team	Pld	W	D	L	GF	GA	GD	Pts	Promotion, qualification or relegation
1	Real Gijón (P)	38	23	8	7	77	32	+45	54	Promotion to La Liga
2	Málaga (P)	38	17	15	6	56	33	+23	49 (Note: Málaga finished ahead of Español on head-to-head points: Málaga–Español 5–0, Español–Málaga 1–1)	Promotion to La Liga
3	Español (P)	38	19	11	8	64	35	+29	49	Promotion to La Liga
4	Real Betis	38	16	15	7	44	34	+10	47	
5	Córdoba	38	17	9	12	40	40	0	43	
6	Rayo Vallecano	38	14	13	11	41	32	+9	41	
7	Oviedo	38	14	12	12	39	32	+7	40	
8	San Andrés	38	13	11	14	32	34	−2	37	
9	Onteniente	38	15	6	17	34	33	+1	36 (Note: Onteniente finished ahead of Ferrol on head-to-head points: Onteniente–Ferrol 3–0, Ferrol–Onteniente 0–0)	
10	Ferrol	38	14	8	16	37	50	−13	36	
11	Castellón	38	14	7	17	36	43	−7	35 (Note: Castellón finished ahead of Calvo Sotelo, Bilbao Atlético and Burgos on head-to-head points: Castellón 7 pts, Calvo Sotelo 7 pts, Bilbao Atlético 6 pts, Burgos 4 pts. Castellón finished ahead of Calvo Sotelo on head-to-head points: Castellón–Calvo Sotelo 2–1, Calvo Sotelo–Castellón 1–1)	
12	Calvo Sotelo	38	12	11	15	37	43	−6	35	
13	Bilbao Atlético (R)	38	13	9	16	33	39	−6	35	Qualification for the relegation playoffs
14	Burgos (O)	38	12	11	15	46	54	−8	35	Qualification for the relegation playoffs
15	Osasuna (R)	38	12	9	17	52	57	−5	33	Qualification for the relegation playoffs
16	Ilicitano (R)	38	11	10	17	46	59	−13	32 (Note: Ilicitano finished ahead of Valladolid on overall goal difference)	Qualification for the relegation playoffs
17	Valladolid (R)	38	12	8	18	45	59	−14	32	Relegation to Tercera División
18	Murcia (R)	38	9	13	16	34	46	−12	31	Relegation to Tercera División
19	Salamanca (R)	38	11	8	19	35	54	−19	30 (Note: Salamanca finished ahead of Orense on head-to-head points: Salamanca–Orense 3–2, Orense–Salamanca 1–2)	Relegation to Tercera División
20	Orense (R)	38	11	8	19	36	55	−19	30	Relegation to Tercera División

Source: BDFútbol
Rules for classification: 1) points; 2) head-to-head points; 3) head-to-head goal difference; 4) goal difference; 5) number of goals scored
(O) Play-off winners; (P) Promoted; (R) Relegated

=== Top goalscorers ===
Goalscorers	Goals	Team
(Spain) Quini	21	Real Gijón
(Spain) Marañón	18	Real Gijón
(Paraguay) Cayetano Ré	17	Español
(Spain) Teófilo Dueñas	14	Rayo Vallecano
(Spain) Gerardo Ortega	14	Calvo Sotelo

=== Top goalkeepers ===
Goalkeeper	Goals	Matches	Average	Team
(Paraguay) Francisco Romero	18	26	0.69	San Andrés
(Spain) Víctor Marro	14	20	0.7	Bilbao Atlético
(Spain) Alejandro Samper	18	25	0.72	Rayo Vallecano
(Spain) Manuel Villanova	17	23	0.74	Real Betis
(Spain) Pere Valentí Mora	27	32	0.84	Oviedo

== Results ==
Home \ Away	BET	BIL	BUR	CAL	CAS	CÓR	ESP	FER	GIJ	ILI	MGA	MUR	ONT	ORE	OSA	OVI	RAY	SAL	SAN	VLD
Betis	—	2–1	3–1	1–0	2–1	0–0	1–1	0–0	1–1	3–1	4–1	1–1	2–1	3–1	2–1	0–0	0–0	1–0	0–0	1–0
Bilbao Atlético	0–1	—	1–1	2–1	3–0	1–1	1–0	0–0	1–0	1–1	1–2	2–0	0–0	2–0	1–0	1–0	1–1	2–0	0–2	0–1
Burgos	1–0	1–1	—	0–1	1–2	1–2	0–0	0–0	1–1	2–3	1–1	1–0	3–2	2–0	3–2	2–1	2–1	2–1	0–0	4–1
Calvo Sotelo	1–2	1–0	1–0	—	1–1	0–1	0–0	1–2	2–1	2–2	2–2	0–1	2–0	1–1	5–2	0–0	2–1	2–0	0–1	3–3
Castellón	1–1	2–0	1–3	2–1	—	1–1	0–3	2–1	0–0	2–1	0–0	3–0	0–1	3–0	3–2	1–0	1–0	2–1	0–0	2–0
Córdoba	0–0	2–1	0–1	3–0	1–0	—	2–0	2–0	0–1	2–1	0–0	0–0	2–1	2–1	1–0	0–0	0–1	3–2	1–0	2–0
Español	2–1	3–0	3–2	3–1	2–0	0–0	—	3–0	2–1	7–0	1–1	1–0	1–0	1–0	4–0	1–1	3–1	5–0	1–1	4–0
Ferrol	0–2	2–1	5–1	2–1	1–0	2–1	1–0	—	1–3	0–0	1–5	3–0	0–0	1–0	3–2	1–1	1–1	1–0	3–2	1–0
Gijón	4–0	3–0	3–0	0–0	2–1	4–2	2–1	2–1	—	2–1	2–1	3–0	3–1	1–1	3–0	4–0	0–1	3–1	3–0	3–0
Ilicitano	3–1	1–0	2–1	0–1	0–1	6–1	3–3	1–0	2–7	—	0–2	2–2	2–1	4–1	0–1	1–1	0–0	1–0	3–2	0–0
Málaga	1–1	1–1	2–0	1–1	2–1	3–1	5–0	2–0	0–1	1–0	—	1–0	1–0	3–0	3–1	3–0	0–0	2–1	3–0	2–1
Murcia	1–1	2–1	1–1	0–1	3–0	0–0	1–2	2–0	1–0	2–1	2–2	—	2–1	0–0	1–1	0–0	3–1	0–1	2–1	2–2
Onteniente	1–1	0–1	1–0	0–0	0–1	0–1	0–1	3–0	1–0	2–0	1–0	2–0	—	1–2	1–0	1–0	1–0	0–0	1–0	2–1
Orense	0–1	1–1	3–1	1–0	1–0	2–1	1–1	2–1	1–4	2–0	3–0	2–0	1–0	—	2–2	2–0	0–0	1–2	0–0	0–1
Osasuna	3–1	3–0	2–2	0–0	3–1	3–1	2–2	0–1	2–2	2–1	0–0	1–1	2–3	1–0	—	1–0	2–1	4–1	3–0	2–0
Oviedo	2–1	0–1	4–1	3–0	0–0	2–0	2–0	2–1	0–0	1–0	2–2	1–0	1–0	3–0	2–0	—	0–1	1–0	1–0	3–0
Rayo Vallecano	2–1	3–0	0–0	1–0	2–0	2–0	0–0	3–1	1–1	0–1	0–0	3–2	1–2	2–0	1–0	3–3	—	2–0	0–0	2–0
Salamanca	0–0	0–2	0–0	3–0	2–1	1–2	2–0	3–0	0–4	1–1	0–0	2–1	0–2	3–2	1–0	1–1	3–2	—	0–0	2–1
San Andrés	0–1	1–0	2–1	0–1	1–0	2–0	0–2	2–0	4–0	1–0	0–0	1–0	1–0	3–1	1–1	1–0	1–1	0–0	—	0–1
Valladolid	1–1	0–2	1–3	1–2	1–0	1–2	3–1	0–0	1–3	1–1	4–1	1–1	1–1	4–1	3–1	2–1	1–0	3–1	4–2	—

Source: BDFútbol
Legend: Blue = home team win; Yellow = draw; Red = away team win.

== Relegation playoffs ==
=== First leg ===
27 June 1970	Tarrasa	2–0	Burgos	Terrassa
	Fausto 18'; Martín 26'	Report		Stadium: Municipal; Referee: Rodríguez Barroso

27 June 1970	Ilicitano	2–2	Real Santander	Elche
	Sigi 2' (pen.), 63'	Report	Cabello 23'; Isidro 55'	Stadium: Altabix; Referee: Orrantia Capelastegui

28 June 1970	Hércules	4–0	Osasuna	Alicante
	Marcos 3', 50'; Costoya 32'; Araujo 69'	Report		Stadium: La Viña; Referee: Peinado Lara

30 June 1970	Bilbao Atlético	2–1	Villarreal	Bilbao
	Carlos 11'; Ormaza 32'	Report	Causanilles 80'	Stadium: San Mamés; Referee: Jiménez Sánchez

=== Second leg ===
4 July 1970	Villarreal	2–1 (3–3 agg.)	Bilbao Atlético	Villarreal
	Palau 12'; Martínez 23'	Report	Carlos 77'	Stadium: El Madrigal; Referee: Canera Coscolín

5 July 1970	Burgos	3–0 (3–2 agg.)	Tarrasa	Burgos
	Alcorta 35'; Olalde 56'; José Luis 66'	Report		Stadium: El Plantío; Referee: Varas Gómez

5 July 1970	Real Santander	0–0 (2–2 agg.)	Ilicitano	Santander
		Report		Stadium: Sardinero; Referee: Orellana Álvarez

5 July 1970	Osasuna	1–0 (1–4 agg.)	Hércules	Pamplona
	Osaba 80'	Report		Stadium: El Sadar; Referee: Acebal Pezón

=== Tiebreaker ===
7 July 1970	Villarreal	2–1	Bilbao Atlético	Madrid
	Luiche 43'; Causanilles 47'	Report	Doro 71'	Stadium: Santiago Bernabéu; Referee: Rodríguez Barroso

7 July 1970	Racing Santander	1–0	Ilicitano	Madrid
	Aguilar 82'	Report		Stadium: Santiago Bernabéu; Referee: Ortiz Salgado
