= Alberto Bernardo =

Spanish footballer (born 1960)

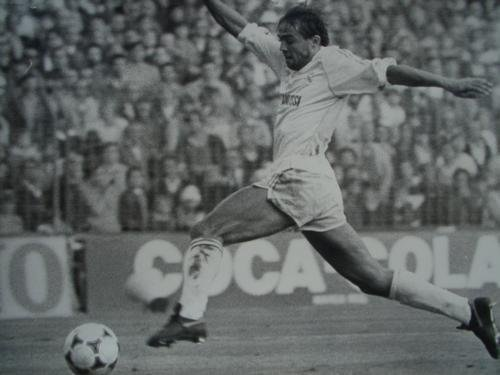
- Bernardo with Real Madrid

Personal information
- Full name: Alberto Bernardo Murcia
- Date of birth: 14 September 1960 (age 66)
- Place of birth: Liège, Belgium
- Height: 1.75 m (5 ft 9 in)
- Position: Midfielder

Youth career
- FC Herstal
- Standard Liège
- Real Madrid

Senior career*
Years	Team	Apps	(Gls)
1979–1986	Real Madrid	23	(1)
1979–1980	→ San Fernando Henares (loan)	33	(10)
1980–1981	→ Alcalá (loan)	37	(9)
1982–1983	Real Madrid Castilla	22	(1)
1984–1986	→ Sporting Gijón (loan)	3	(0)
1986–1987	Osasuna	9	(0)
1987–1988	Valladolid	7	(0)
1988–1989	Recreativo Huelva	14	(1)
1989–1991	Melilla	61	(8)
1991–1992	Mosconia	15	(1)
Total		249	(35)
- * Club domestic league appearances and goals

Alberto Bernardo Murcia (born 14 September 1960) is a Spanish former footballer who played as a midfielder.

He played 42 games in La Liga for Real Madrid, Sporting Gijón, Osasuna and Real Valladolid, scoring once. In the Segunda División, he recorded 61 games and 6 goals for Castilla and Recreativo Huelva. His career was affected by several long-term injuries.

== Early life ==
Bernardo was born in Liège in Belgium, to parents from the Spanish region of Asturias. His father was a miner and tailor. His father was born in Sotrondio and his mother in Laviana, both in the comarca of Nalón.

While Bernardo was a youth player for FC Herstal and Standard Liège, the Royal Belgian Football Association sought to naturalise him as a citizen of the country so he could play for the national team. He did not pursue this, due to his aim of playing for Spain.

Having been raised in Wallonia, Bernardo learned French to a native level. He also learned English, Dutch and German in his childhood.

== Career ==
When Bernardo was about to sign for Rangers of Scotland, Real Madrid completed a deal for the 16-year-old. He was loaned to CD San Fernando de Henares in the Tercera División and RSD Alcalá of the Segunda División B, before playing for the reserve team Castilla in the Segunda División.

Bernardo made his first-team and La Liga debut on 11 April 1982, under manager Luis Molowny. Away to CD Castellón, he came on as a 60th-minute substitute for fellow debutant Isaac Jiménez Serrano in a 2–1 win; due to a professionals' strike, Castilla were playing for Real Madrid and the opponents were represented by their youth team.

On 14 September 1983, Bernardo made the only European appearance of his career, a 3–2 loss away to AC Sparta Prague in the first round of the UEFA Cup. His only top-flight goal came on 2 October as a late substitute, concluding a 6–2 home win over Cádiz CF for Alfredo Di Stéfano's team; ten days later he took under two minutes to score in a 2–1 win away to CD Badajoz in the second round of the Copa del Rey.

Bernardo struggled with injuries throughout his career, missing out on an under-21 international game against the Netherlands, and was monitored for a call-up for the senior team at UEFA Euro 1984 before another setback. He moved to Sporting Gijón of his parents' native region, where he was sidelined twice for four months each before being dropped by manager Novoa.

Bernardo remained in La Liga with Osasuna and Real Valladolid. He then dropped down the divisions to play for Recreativo de Huelva, UD Melilla and CD Mosconia.

== Personal life ==
As of 2011, Bernardo was working in packing and delivery for food production company Agromar in Gijón.
