= Fernando Tocornal =

Spanish former football player

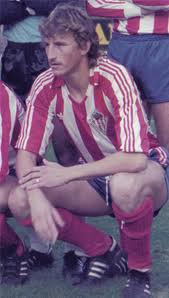

Personal information
- Full name: Fernando Tocornal Linares
- Date of birth: 26 June 1961 (age 65)
- Place of birth: Laredo, Spain
- Height: 1.91 m (6 ft 3 in)
- Positions: Centre back; midfielder

Youth career
- –1979: Sporting de Gijón

Senior career*
Years	Team	Apps	(Gls)
1979–1983	Sporting de Gijón Atlético	67	(9)
1981–1986	Sporting de Gijón	32	(1)
1983–1984	→ Palencia (loan)	31	(2)
1985–1986	→ Real Murcia (loan)	25	(5)
1987–1989	Real Oviedo	36	(3)
1989–1992	Real Burgos	77	(1)
1992–1996	Compostela	131	(4)
1996–1998	Badajoz	47	(1)
1998–1999	Lealtad	25	(1)
Total		471	(27)
- * Club domestic league appearances and goals

Fernando Tocornal Linares (born 26 June 1961) is a Spanish former professional footballer who played as a centre back, or occasionally a midfielder.

== Career ==
Tocornal was born in Laredo in the autonomous community of Cantabria, but began his career in the youth teams of Asturian club Sporting de Gijón. He began to feature for the B team, Sporting de Gijón Atlético, during 1979–80, suffering relegation from Segunda División B in his first season. The following season, he was part of the team that won their Tercera División group and earned promotion at the first attempt. He made his La Liga debut for the first team in 1980–81, which came on 29 November in a 2–1 away loss to Athletic Bilbao at San Mamés. He played the first 64 minutes before being replaced by Pedro González.

The following season, Tocornal returned to Atlético, where he added some more silverware as they won the Copa de la Liga Segunda División B. He spent 1983–84 on loan with Palencia, who were relegated from the Segunda División that year. He returned to play in the top flight again with Sporting the following year, making 23 appearances. He left the club on another season-long in the summer of 1985, joining Real Murcia, and helped them win the Segunda División title and earn promotion to the top flight. He left Sporting for good in January 1987, joining Real Oviedo in the second tier. In his first full season with Oviedo, they won promotion to La Liga, although Tocornal played only twice in the ensuing campaign.

Tocornal joined Real Burgos in 1989, and in his first season he won the second Segunda División title of his career, and was promoted to the top flight for the third time. He played 50 matches for Burgos over the next two seasons in the top division, before signing from Compostela ahead of the 1992–93 Segunda División season. A fourth La Liga promotion followed in 1993–94, and he continued to be a regular starter during the next two seasons. He was a key part of the side that recorded Compostela's best ever league result, finishing 10th in 1995–96. Tocornal joined Badajoz in the summer of 1996, coming under the management of his former Gijón teammate Antonio Maceda. After two seasons with Badajoz, Tocornal saw out his career by spending the 1998–99 season at Lealtad, before retiring that summer as he reached his 38th birthday. Between his spells with Gijón, Oviedo, Burgos and Compostela, he amassed 146 La Liga appearances, scoring three goals.

== Honours ==
Sporting de Gijón Atlético

- Tercera División: 1980–81
- Copa de la Liga Segunda División B: 1983

Real Murcia

- Segunda División: 1985–86

Real Burgos

- Segunda División: 1989–90

== Career statistics ==
As of 11 March 2021

Club	Season	League			Cup		Other		Total	
Club	Season	Division	Apps	Goals	Apps	Goals	Apps	Goals	Apps	Goals
Sporting de Gijón Atlético	1979–80	Segunda División B	17	5	0	0	–		17	5
Sporting de Gijón Atlético	1980–81	Tercera División	4	0	–		–		4	0
Sporting de Gijón Atlético	1981–82	Segunda División B	23	3	2	0	–		25	3
Sporting de Gijón Atlético	1982–83	Segunda División B	23	1	–		8	4	31	5
Sporting de Gijón Atlético	Total		67	9	2	0	8	4	77	13
Sporting de Gijón	1981–82	La Liga	9	0	0	0	–		9	0
Sporting de Gijón	1984–85	La Liga	23	1	5	1	3	1	31	3
Sporting de Gijón	1986–87	La Liga	0	0	0	0	–		0	0
Sporting de Gijón	Total		32	1	5	1	3	1	40	3
Palencia	1983–84	Segunda División	31	2	3	0	2	0	36	2
Real Murcia	1985–86	Segunda División	25	5	0	0	0	0	25	5
Real Oviedo	1986–87	Segunda División	7	0	0	0	–		7	0
Real Oviedo	1987–88	Segunda División	27	3	3	1	1	0	31	4
Real Oviedo	1988–89	La Liga	2	0	0	0	–		2	0
Real Oviedo	Total		36	3	3	1	1	0	40	4
Real Burgos	1989–90	Segunda División	27	0	0	0	–		27	0
Real Burgos	1990–91	La Liga	20	0	3	0	–		23	0
Real Burgos	1991–92	La Liga	30	1	5	0	–		35	1
Real Burgos	Total		77	1	8	0	0	0	85	1
Compostela	1992–93	Segunda División	36	1	5	1	–		41	2
Compostela	1993–94	Segunda División	33	2	4	0	1	0	38	2
Compostela	1994–95	La Liga	31	1	3	0	–		34	1
Compostela	1995–96	La Liga	31	0	4	1	–		35	1
Compostela	Total		131	4	16	2	1	0	148	6
Badajoz	1996–97	Segunda División	31	0	1	0	–		32	0
Badajoz	1997–98	Segunda División	16	1	4	0	–		20	1
Badajoz	Total		47	1	5	0	0	0	52	1
Lealtad	1998–99	Segunda División B	25	1	2	0	–		27	1
Career total			471	27	44	4	15	5	530	36

1. Appearances in the 1983 Copa de la Liga Segunda División B
2. Appearances in the 1985 Copa de la Liga
3. Appearances in the 1984 Copa de la Liga Segunda División
4. Appearance in the 1987–88 Segunda División promotion playoff
5. Appearance in the 1993–94 Segunda División promotion playoff
