= Mino (footballer) =

Spanish footballer

Personal information
- Full name: Bernardino Serrano Mori
- Date of birth: 29 January 1963 (age 63)
- Place of birth: Antromero, Spain
- Height: 1.85 m (6 ft 1 in)
- Position: Centre-back

Youth career
- Sporting Gijón

Senior career*
Years	Team	Apps	(Gls)
1981–1984	Sporting Gijón B	92	(1)
1981–1986	Sporting Gijón	64	(3)
1986–1988	Real Madrid	22	(1)
1988–1990	Sevilla	34	(0)
1990–1994	Español	134	(2)
1994–1995	Mallorca	32	(1)
1995–1997	Logroñés	28	(0)
Total		406	(8)
- * Club domestic league appearances and goals

Bernardino Serrano Mori (born 29 January 1963 in Antromero, Asturias), known as Mino, is a Spanish former professional footballer who played as a central defender.

== Honours ==
Real Madrid

- La Liga: 1986–87, 1987–88

Español

- Segunda División: 1993–94
