= Orlando Giménez =

Paraguayan footballer (born 1952)

Personal information
- Full name: Orlando Ramón Giménez Álvarez
- Date of birth: 24 January 1952 (age 74)
- Place of birth: Trinidad, Paraguay
- Height: 1.79 m (5 ft 10 in)
- Position: Forward

Senior career*
Years	Team	Apps	(Gls)
- Libertad
- Cerro Porteño
- Sportivo Luqueño
1976–1979	Racing Santander	79	(29)
1979–1981	Valencia	23	(4)
1981–1986	Español	142	(43)
1986	Sabadell	9	(0)
1988	Horta		
Total		253+	(76+)
- * Club domestic league appearances and goals

Orlando Ramón Giménez Álvarez (born 24 January 1952) is a Paraguayan former professional footballer who played as a forward.

He spent 11 seasons in Spain, totalling 253 games and 76 goals in La Liga for Racing Santander, Valencia, Español and Sabadell. He won the UEFA Cup Winners' Cup and the UEFA Super Cup with Valencia in 1980.

== Career ==
=== Racing Santander ===
Giménez was born in Trinidad in the department of Itapúa. He began playing in Paraguay for Libertad, Cerro Porteño and Sportivo Luqueño.

In July 1976, Giménez signed for Racing Santander in Spain's La Liga. He made his debut on 4 October in a 1–1 draw at Burgos and scored his first goal on 7 November as consolation in a 3–1 loss away to Real Sociedad. On 6 February, in only his seventh minute after coming on as a substitute for the injured Quinito, he was sent off in a 1–0 defeat at Sevilla for fouling opposing goalkeeper Paco Brenes. He played 25 total games in his first season in Cantabria, scoring 7 goals including a hat-trick on 15 May in the last home fixture, a 3–2 home win over Málaga.

Giménez scored 11 league goals in each of his next two seasons, including another haul of three on 5 November 1978 in a 3–2 win away to Español.

=== Valencia ===
In May 1979, Giménez left relegated Racing, signing a three-year deal at Valencia. The transfer fee was estimated at 40 million Spanish pesetas and an annual salary of 5 million. Real Madrid president Luis de Carlos had wanted to sign him, but was informed of the news by the Royal Spanish Football Federation.

Giménez took part in the Valencia side that won the UEFA Cup Winners' Cup in 1979–80, playing two early games against Denmark's B1903 and away to Rangers in Scotland. On 25 November 1980 he played the first leg of the club's eventual UEFA Super Cup victory over Nottingham Forest, replacing Darío Felman for the last four minutes of a 2–1 loss in the first leg in England.

=== Español ===
Having taken no part with Valencia at the start of 1981–82, Giménez moved to Español, making his debut on 8 November in a 1–0 home win over Cádiz. He said that he wondered why Valencia had signed him in the first place.

Giménez played 164 total games for the Pericos, scoring 51 goals. On 14 December 1983, he took the direct free kick that was the only goal of a Derbi Barceloní win against FC Barcelona at Sarrià Stadium.

=== Sabadell and later career ===
Giménez remained in Catalonia, signing for newly promoted Sabadell in 1986 among several compatriots. He played 12 games in the league and Copa del Rey, split equally between starter and substitute, and scored a penalty on 17 September to win the game 2–1 in the first round of the cup away to Mollerussa. At the end of the calendar year, he asked to leave the club.

After playing futsal, 36-year-old Giménez returned to football in February 1988 at Barcelona-based UA Horta, in the fifth tier of Spanish football. In 2001, he and another former player went to court claiming 360 million pesetas (€2.164 million) as intermediaries in the transfer of Javier Saviola from River Plate to Barcelona. Their lawsuit was dismissed in April 2004.
