= Manuel Badás =

Spanish football manager (1932–2008)

Personal information
- Full name: Manuel Badás González
- Date of birth: 27 April 1932
- Place of birth: Valladolid, Spain

Manuel Badás González, better known as Badás, (born on 27 April 1932–17 February 2008) was a Spanish football manager. He made his debut as a coach in 1967 at Club Deportivo Lugo. Badás would later go on coach Sporting de Gijón and various other Spanish teams such as Real Avilés Club de Fútbol.
