= Bert Jacobs =

Dutch football manager (1941–1999)

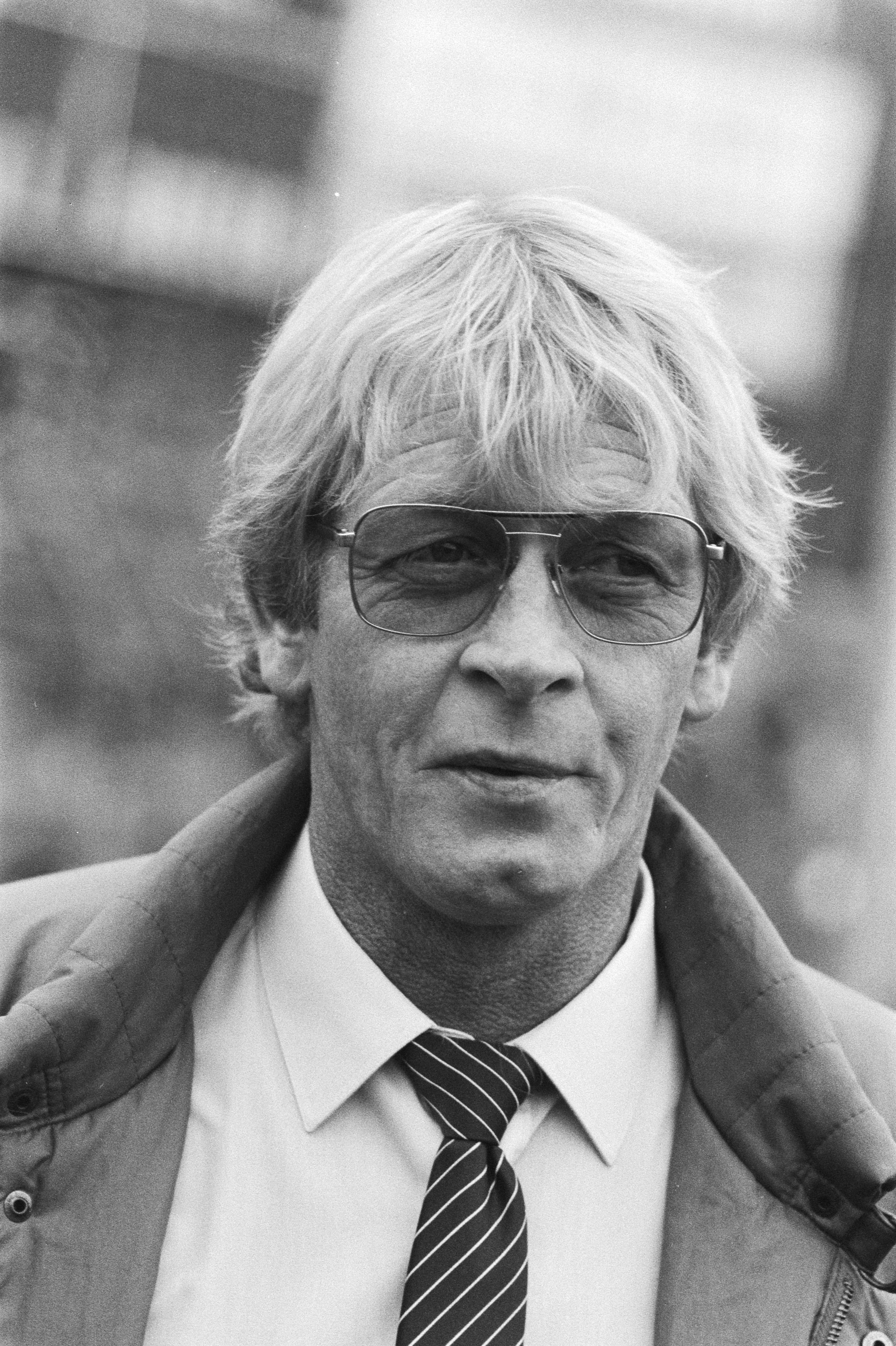
- Jacobs in 1983

Personal information
- Date of birth: 5 March 1941
- Place of birth: Zandvoort, Netherlands
- Date of death: 14 November 1999 (aged 58)
- Place of death: Haarlem, Netherlands

Senior career*
Years	Team	Apps	(Gls)
- Zandvoortmeeuwen
- HFC Haarlem

Managerial career
- 1967–1969: De Volewijckers
- 1969–1970: Velox
- 1970–1974: FC Utrecht
- 1974–1980: Roda JC
- 1980–1982: Willem II Tilburg
- 1982–1983: Seiko SA
- 1983–1984: Sparta Rotterdam
- 1984–1987: Fortuna Sittard
- 1987–1992: Vitesse Arnhem
- 1992–1993: Sporting de Gijón
- 1995–1996: FC Volendam
- 1996–1997: RKC Waalwijk
- * Club domestic league appearances and goals

Bert Jacobs (5 March 1941 – 14 November 1999) was a Dutch football manager and player. Having become a football coach at a young age, he worked for Roda JC, FC Utrecht, Fortuna Sittard, Vitesse Arnhem, RKC Waalwijk and Sporting de Gijón. Renowned for his level-headed insight into the game of football and for coining the term "Hol Knots Begonia football."

== Career ==
Jacobs briefly played for HFC Haarlem, making three appearances before ending his career due to a knee injury.

He started working as a youth coach at ADO Den Haag at the age of 23.
