= Novoa (Spanish footballer) =

Spanish football player and manager (1944–2026)

Personal information
- Full name: José Manuel Díaz Novoa
- Date of birth: 1 January 1944
- Place of birth: Gijón, Spain
- Date of death: 5 July 2026 (aged 82)
- Place of death: Gijón, Spain
- Position: Forward

Youth career
- Real Gijón

Senior career*
Years	Team	Apps	(Gls)
1963–1967	Real Gijón	36	(16)
1967–1970	Celta	23	(6)
1970–1971	Avilés	15	(2)
Total		74	(24)

Managerial career
- 1973–1979: Sporting Gijón B
- 1979–1980: Sporting Gijón
- 1982: Sporting Gijón
- 1982–1983: Sporting Gijón B
- 1984–1988: Sporting Gijón
- 1988–1989: Celta
- 1990–1992: Real Burgos
- 1992–1993: Espanyol
- 1996: Sporting Gijón
- 1996–1997: Málaga
- 1997–1998: Sporting Gijón
- 2000–2002: Asturias
- * Club domestic league appearances and goals

José Manuel Díaz Novoa (1 January 1944 – 5 July 2026), known as Novoa, was a Spanish footballer who played as a forward, and a manager.

Novoa spent most of his playing and managerial career linked with Sporting Gijón, but also managed other La Liga sides such as Celta, Real Burgos and Espanyol.

== Playing career ==
Born in Gijón, Asturias, Novoa made his professional debut with hometown side Sporting de Gijón during the 1962–63 season, in the Copa del Generalísimo. In 1967, he moved to fellow Segunda División side RC Celta de Vigo, helping in their promotion to La Liga in 1969.

Novoa made his debut in the top tier of Spanish football on 21 September 1969, playing the last 21 minutes in a 1–1 home draw against CE Sabadell FC. He moved to Tercera División side Real Avilés CF in the following year, but retired in 1971 at the age of just 27 after a severe knee injury.

== Managerial career ==
After retiring Novoa started working as a coach, being named manager of first club Sporting's B-team in 1973. For the 1979–80 season, he was named in charge of the first team.

Novoa left in June 1980, but returned to the Rojiblancos in March 1982, replacing Vicente Miera. After the first team appointed Vujadin Boškov as manager, he moved down to manage the reserves for a second spell.

He returned to the reins of the first team in 1984, as Boškov left for Ascoli Calcio. In April 1988, after the club decided not to renew his contract, he accepted an offer of another club he represented as a player, Celta.

Novoa was sacked by Celta in December 1989, and was appointed manager of another top tier club, Real Burgos CF, the following July. He left the club in 1992 for fellow league team RCD Espanyol.

He was dismissed by the Catalans in May 1993, with his side subsequently suffering relegation. He only returned to coaching duties in January 1996, taking over Sporting for a third spell.

Novoa was named in charge of Segunda División B side Málaga CF midway through the 1996–97 campaign, replacing sacked Pepe Cayuela. He left the club in May 1997, and eventually returned to Sporting in December; with the club seriously threatened with relegation, he left the following March.

He subsequently coached the Asturias autonomous team from 2000 to 2002 before retiring. He ended his career as the manager who was in charge of Sporting the most times, with a total of 371 games; 230 of them in the main category.

== Death ==
Novoa died in July 2026, at the age of 82.
