= 1995–96 Sporting de Gijón season =

Real Sporting
1995–96 season
- Chairman: José Fernández
- Manager: José Manuel Díaz Novoa
- Stadium: El Molinón
- La Liga: 18th
- Copa del Rey: Round of 16
- Top goalscorer: Julio Salinas (18)
- Average home league attendance: 21,608

The 1995–96 Sporting de Gijón season was the 34th season of the club in La Liga, the 20th consecutive after its last promotion.

== Overview ==
Ricardo Rezza, who saved the team in the relegation playoffs the previous season, was sacked after round 19, when the club earned five consecutive losses. Ramiro Solís took the helm one week before José Manuel Díaz Novoa signed until the end of the season.

After scoring 18 goals in La Liga and four more in the Copa del Rey, Julio Salinas was called up with the Spanish national team to play the UEFA Euro 1996.

== Squad ==
Note: Flags indicate national team as defined under FIFA eligibility rules; some limited exceptions apply. Players may hold more than one non-FIFA nationality.

No.	Pos.	Nation	Player
1	GK	ESP	Juan Carlos Ablanedo
2	DF	ESP	Marcelino
4	DF	ESP	Juan Ramón López Muñiz
5	MF	ARG	Hugo Pérez
6	DF	ESP	Fernando Giner
7	MF	ESP	Iván Iglesias
7	FW	ESP	José Luis Morales
8	MF	ESP	Tomás
9	FW	ESP	Eloy
10	MF	RUS	Igor Lediakhov

No.	Pos.	Nation	Player
11	MF	ROU	Marcel Sabou
13	GK	ESP	Ramón
14	FW	ESP	Dani Bouzas
15	FW	ESP	Julio Salinas
16	FW	ESP	Marcos Vales
17	DF	ESP	Pablo
18	MF	ESP	Avelino
20	FW	NGA	Rashidi Yekini
21	DF	ESP	Jesús Enrique Velasco
22	MF	ESP	Ricardo Bango

=== From the youth squad ===
Note: Flags indicate national team as defined under FIFA eligibility rules; some limited exceptions apply. Players may hold more than one non-FIFA nationality.

No.	Pos.	Nation	Player
23	DF	ESP	Tino
24	MF	ESP	David Cano
26	MF	ESP	Mario
27	MF	ESP	Aitor
28	MF	ESP	Álex

No.	Pos.	Nation	Player
30	DF	ESP	Rubén Darío Acebal
31	DF	ESP	Rogelio
32	MF	ESP	José Manuel
33	DF	ESP	Sergio
—	MF	ESP	Rafa Navarro

== Competitions ==
=== La Liga ===
==== Results by round ====
Round	1	2	3	4	5	6	7	8	9	10	11	12	13	14	15	16	17	18	19	20	21	22	23	24	25	26	27	28	29	30	31	32	33	34	35	36	37	38	39	40	41	42
Ground	H	A	H	A	A	H	A	H	A	H	H	H	A	H	A	H	A	H	A	H	A	A	H	A	H	H	A	H	A	H	A	H	A	H	A	H	A	H	A	H	A	H
Result	W	L	W	L	L	W	D	W	L	W	L	W	L	D	L	L	L	L	L	W	L	W	D	D	L	L	L	L	D	D	L	W	D	W	W	L	W	L	L	W	L	L
Position	5	8	6	11	11	10	10	6	9	6	8	6	7	7	10	11	12	14	15	13	14	13	13	13	15	15	16	18	18	18	19	18	18	15	14	16	13	14	17	14	15	18

Source: BDFutbol
A = Away; H = Home; W = Win; D = Draw; L = Loss

==== League table ====
Pos	Team	Pld	W	D	L	GF	GA	GD	Pts	Qualification or relegation
16	Valladolid	42	11	14	17	57	62	−5	47 (Note: RAC 0–0 VLD; VLD 3–1 RAC)	
17	Racing Santander	42	11	14	17	47	69	−22	47	
18	Sporting Gijón	42	13	7	22	51	60	−9	46	
19	Rayo Vallecano (O)	42	12	8	22	47	75	−28	44	Qualification for the relegation playoffs
20	Albacete (R)	42	10	12	20	55	81	−26	42 (Note: MÉR 1–1 ALB; ALB 2–0 MÉR)	Qualification for the relegation playoffs

Source: LFP
Rules for classification: 1) points; 2) head-to-head points; 3) head-to-head goal difference; 4) head-to-head goals scored; 5) goal difference; 6) number of goals scored.
(O) Play-off winners; (R) Relegated

==== Matches ====
2 September 1995 1	Real Sporting	3–0	Albacete	Gijón
	Maqueda 16' (o.g.); Julio Salinas 21'; Tomás 42'	Summary		Stadium: El Molinón; Referee: Puentes Leira

10 September 1995 2	Real Sociedad	2–0	Real Sporting	San Sebastián
	Karpin 34', 87'	Summary		Stadium: Anoeta; Referee: Gómez López

17 September 1995 3	Real Sporting	4–2	Racing Santander	Gijón
	Lediakhov 26', 76'; Julio Salinas 40', 64'	Summary	Alberto 37'; Merino 47'; Zygmantovich (red card) 89'	Stadium: El Molinón; Referee: Rubio Valdivieso

24 September 1995 4	Atlético Madrid	2–0	Real Sporting	Madrid
	Vizcaíno 9'; Penev 53'	Summary	Lediakhov (red card) 40'	Stadium: Vicente Calderón; Referee: Andradas Asurmendi

30 September 1995 5	Athletic Bilbao	2–1	Real Sporting	Bilbao
	Guerrero 38', 76'	Summary	Julio Salinas 78'	Stadium: San Mamés; Referee: Gracia Redondo

4 October 1995 6	Real Sporting	3–1	Sevilla	Gijón
	Tomás 16'; Julio Salinas 74'; Hugo Pérez 89'<	Report	Carlitos 44'	Stadium: El Molinón; Referee: Núñez Manrique

8 October 1995 7	Espanyol	0–0	Real Sporting	Barcelona
		Summary	Tomás (yellow card) (yellow-red card) 34'	Stadium: Sarrià; Referee: Daudén Ibáñez

15 October 1995 8	Real Sporting	1–0	Celta	Gijón
	Sabou 46'	Summary		Stadium: El Molinón; Referee: Ansuategui Roca

22 October 1995 9	Deportivo La Coruña	1–0	Real Sporting	A Coruña
	Radchenko 25'; Paco (red card) 78'	Report		Stadium: Riazor; Referee: Megía Dávila

29 October 1995 10	Real Sporting	4–2	Valladolid	Gijón
	Hugo Pérez 21'; Aitor 54'; Eloy 59'; Julio Salinas 82'	Report	Fernando 2'; Torres Gómez 35'	Stadium: El Molinón; Referee: Rodríguez Martel

5 November 1995 11	Mérida	1–0	Real Sporting	Mérida
	Prieto 42'	Report		Stadium: Romano José Fouto; Referee: Prados García

12 November 1995 12	Real Sporting	4–1	Zaragoza	Gijón
	Julio Salinas 24', 89'; Sabou 26'; David Cano 38'	Summary	Nayim 75'	Stadium: El Molinón; Referee: Japón Sevilla

19 November 1995 13	Rayo Vallecano	2–0	Real Sporting	Madrid
	Baroja 5' (pen.); Cortijo (yellow card) (yellow-red card) 69'; Aquino 78'	Report	Ablanedo (red card) 3'	Stadium: Vallecas; Referee: Carmona Méndez

26 November 1995 14	Real Sporting	0–0	Real Madrid	Gijón
		Report		Stadium: El Molinón; Referee: López de la Fuente

3 December 1995 15	Oviedo	1–0	Real Sporting	Oviedo
	Bango 89' (o.g.)	Summary		Stadium: Carlos Tartiere; Referee: López Nieto

10 November 1995 16	Real Sporting	2–3	Real Betis	Gijón
	Hugo Pérez 27'; Bango 82'	Summary	Jarni 47' (pen.), 53'; Cañas 77'	Stadium: El Molinón; Referee: Gómez López

16 December 1995 17	Barcelona	1–0	Real Sporting	Barcelona
	Popescu 7'	Summary		Stadium: Camp Nou; Referee: Rubio Valdivieso

20 December 1995 18	Real Sporting	1–3	Valencia	Gijón
	Yekini 73'	Report	Mijatović 41', 75'; Viola 85'	Stadium: El Molinón; Referee: Iturralde González

3 January 1996 19	Compostela	1–0	Real Sporting	Santiago de Compostela
	Lekumberri 6'	Report		Stadium: San Lázaro; Referee: Fernández Marín

7 January 1996 20	Sporting de Gijón	3–2	Salamanca	Gijón
	Julio Salinas 1' (14); Lediakhov 49' (pen.)	Summary	Torrecilla (red card) 27'; Medina 40'; Barbarà 81'	Stadium: El Molinón; Referee: Esquinas Torres

14 February 1996 21	Tenerife	3–0	Real Sporting	Santa Cruz de Tenerife
	Chano 8'; Ramis 84'; Pizzi 89'	Summary		Stadium: Heliodoro Rodríguez López; Referee: Núñez Manrique

21 January 1996 22	Albacete	1–3	Real Sporting	Albacete
	Luna 28'; Jesús Muñoz (yellow card) (yellow-red card) 69'	Summary	Yekini 12'; Avelino 18'; Julio Salinas 75'	Stadium: Carlos Belmonte; Referee: Prados García

24 January 1996 23	Real Sporting	1–1	Real Sociedad	Gijón
	Loren 49' (o.g.)	Summary	Craioveanu 10'	Stadium: El Molinón; Referee: Daudén Ibáñez

28 January 1996 24	Racing Santander	1–1	Real Sporting	Santander
	Mutiu 14'	Summary	Hugo Pérez 40'	Stadium: El Sardinero; Referee: Brito Arceo

3 February 1996 25	Real Sporting	1–2	Atlético Madrid	Gijón
	Lediakhov 72' (pen.)	Summary	Pantić 25'; Caminero 68'; Santi (red card) 71'	Stadium: El Molinón; Referee: Japón Sevilla

11 February 1996 26	Real Sporting	1–2	Athletic Bilbao	Gijón
	Yekini 56'; Giner (yellow card) (yellow-red card) 81'	Summary	Etxeberria 27'; Bolo 65'	Stadium: El Molinón; Referee: Rodríguez Martel

18 February 1996 27	Sevilla	2–0	Real Sporting	Seville
	Moya 48'; Marcos 85'	Summary	Avelino (yellow card) (yellow-red card) 44'	Stadium: Ramón Sánchez Pizjuán; Referee: Barrenechea Montero

25 February 1996 28	Real Sporting	2–3	Espanyol	Gijón
	Eloy 11'; Julio Salinas 68'	Summary	Bogdanović 1'; Javi García 81'; Àlex Fernández 89'	Stadium: El Molinón; Referee: Carmona Méndez

3 March 1996 29	Celta	0–0	Real Sporting	Vigo
		Summary		Stadium: Balaídos; Referee: Rubio Valdivieso

10 March 1996 30	Real Sporting	1–1	Deportivo La Coruña	Gijón
	Eloy 31'	Summary	López Rekarte 51'	Stadium: El Molinón; Referee: Esquinas Torres

17 March 1996 31	Valladolid	1–0	Real Sporting	Valladolid
	Marcos 63'	Summary	Ablanedo (red card) 69'	Stadium: José Zorrilla; Referee: Gracia Redondo

23 March 1996 32	Real Sporting	3–1	Mérida	Gijón
	Julio Salinas 1'; Dani Bouzas 55'; Mario 88'	Summary	Prieto 16'	Stadium: El Molinón; Referee: García Aranda

27 March 1996 33	Zaragoza	1–1	Real Sporting	Zaragoza
	Rambert 34'	Summary	Lediakhov 13'; Muñiz (red card)	Stadium: La Romareda; Referee: López Nieto

31 March 1996 34	Real Sporting	3–1	Rayo Vallecano	Gijón
	Julio Salinas 29', 38', 65'	Summary	Cota 35'; Alcázar (red card) 80'	Stadium: El Molinón; Referee: Prados García

7 April 1996 35	Real Madrid	0–1	Real Sporting	Madrid
		Summary	Velasco 13'	Stadium: Santiago Bernabéu; Referee: Iturralde González

14 April 1996 36	Real Sporting	0–1	Oviedo	Gijón
	Dani Bouzas (yellow card) (yellow-red card) 24'; Bango (red card) 26'	Summary	Carlos 47'	Stadium: El Molinón; Referee: Carmona Méndez

21 April 1996 37	Real Betis	2–5	Real Sporting	Seville
	Kowalczyk 20'; Vidaković 70' (pen.)	Summary	Mario 2'; Lediakhov 19'; Julio Salinas 38', 51'; David Cano 88'	Stadium: Benito Villamarín; Referee: Daudén Ibáñez

28 April 1996 38	Real Sporting	0–3	Barcelona	Gijón
		Summary	De la Peña 4'; Hagi 15'; Óscar 26'	Stadium: El Molinón; Referee: Fernández Marín

4 May 1996 39	Valencia	1–0	Real Sporting	Valencia
	Viola 57'	Summary		Stadium: Mestalla; Referee: Puentes Leira

12 May 1996 40	Real Sporting	2–1	Compostela	Gijón
	Lediakhov 8' (pen.), 76'	Summary	Christensen 17' (pen.)	Stadium: El Molinón; Referee: Ansuategui Roca

19 May 1996 41	Salamanca	3–0	Real Sporting	Villares de la Reina
	Claudio 11', 16'; Sito 25'	Summary		Stadium: Helmántico; Referee: Gómez López

25 May 1996 42	Real Sporting	0–2	Tenerife	Gijón
		Summary	Aguilera 17'; Pinilla 47'	Stadium: El Molinón; Referee: Andradas Asurmendi

=== Copa del Rey ===
==== Matches ====
24 October 1995 Second round First leg	Racing Ferrol	1–1	Real Sporting	Ferrol
	Mendiola 18'	Report	Marcelino 85'	Stadium: A Malata; Referee: Iturralde González

8 November 1995 Second round Second leg	Real Sporting	4–0 (5–1 agg.)	Racing Ferrol	Gijón
	Eloy 14'; Aitor 74'; Dani Bouzas 88'; Hugo Pérez 90' (pen.)	Report		Stadium: El Molinón; Referee: Barrenechea Montero

29 November 1995 Third round First leg	Écija	2–0	Real Sporting	Écija
	Quino 36'; Fede 73'	Report		Stadium: San Pablo; Referee: Brito Arceo

13 December 1995 Third round Second leg	Real Sporting	5–0 (5–2 agg.)	Écija	Gijón
	Julio Salinas 12', 72', 80', 83'; Velasco 60'	Report		Stadium: El Molinón; Referee: García Aranda

10 January 1996 Round of 16; First leg	Numancia	2–1	Real Sporting	Soria
	Artigas 46'; Murillo 62'	Report	Eloy 15'	Stadium: Los Pajaritos; Referee: Puentes Leira

17 January 1996 Round of 16; Second leg	Real Sporting	0–0 (1–2 agg.)	Numancia	Gijón
	Hugo Pérez (red card) 21'	Report		Stadium: El Molinón; Referee: Megía Dávila

== Squad statistics ==
=== Appearances and goals ===
No.	Pos	Nat	Player	Total		La Liga		Copa del Rey	
No.	Pos	Nat	Player	Apps	Goals	Apps	Goals	Apps	Goals
1	GK	(Spain) ESP	Juan Carlos Ablanedo	39	0	36+0	0	3+0	0
2	DF	(Spain) ESP	Marcelino Elena	7	1	3+1	0	3+0	1
4	DF	(Spain) ESP	Juan Ramón López Muñiz	31	0	25+1	0	5+0	0
5	MF	(Argentina) ARG	Hugo Pérez	42	5	26+11	4	4+1	1
6	DF	(Spain) ESP	Fernando Giner	24	0	24+0	0	0+0	0
7	MF	(Spain) ESP	Iván Iglesias	18	0	14+4	0	0+0	0
7	FW	(Spain) ESP	José Luis Morales	4	0	0+3	0	1+0	0
8	MF	(Spain) ESP	Tomás	40	2	21+14	2	5+0	0
9	FW	(Spain) ESP	Eloy Olaya	29	5	21+2	3	5+1	2
10	MF	(Russia) RUS	Igor Lediakhov	33	8	29+1	8	3+0	0
11	MF	(Romania) ROU	Marcel Sabou	16	2	8+7	2	1+0	0
13	GK	(Spain) ESP	Ramón	11	0	6+2	0	3+0	0
14	FW	(Spain) ESP	Dani Bouzas	35	2	13+18	1	3+1	1
15	FW	(Spain) ESP	Julio Salinas	42	22	36+2	18	3+1	4
16	FW	(Spain) ESP	Marcos Vales	13	0	2+7	0	2+2	0
17	DF	(Spain) ESP	Pablo	40	0	37+0	0	3+0	0
18	MF	(Spain) ESP	Avelino	33	1	22+7	1	4+0	0
20	FW	(Nigeria) NGA	Rashidi Yekini	13	3	4+6	3	2+1	0
21	DF	(Spain) ESP	Jesús Enrique Velasco	39	2	29+4	1	3+3	1
22	MF	(Spain) ESP	Ricardo Bango	42	1	37+1	1	4+0	0
23	DF	(Spain) ESP	Tino	12	0	9+0	0	3+0	0
24	MF	(Spain) ESP	David Cano	36	2	25+6	2	3+2	0
26	MF	(Spain) ESP	Mario	24	2	14+9	2	0+1	0
27	MF	(Spain) ESP	Aitor	3	2	1+0	1	0+2	1
28	MF	(Spain) ESP	Álex	1	0	0+1	0	0+0	0
30	DF	(Spain) ESP	Rubén Darío Acebal	13	0	13+0	0	0+0	0
31	DF	(Spain) ESP	Rogelio	2	0	1+0	0	1+0	0
32	MF	(Spain) ESP	José Manuel	6	0	4+1	0	0+1	0
33	DF	(Spain) ESP	Sergio	3	0	2+0	0	1+0	0
	MF	(Spain) ESP	Rafa Navarro	2	0	0+0	0	1+1	0
