= List of Real Oviedo records and statistics =

Real Oviedo (Asturian: Real Uviéu) is a Spanish football club based in Oviedo, in the autonomous community of Asturias. Founded on 26 March 1926 as a result of the merger of two clubs who had maintained a large sporting rivalry for years in the city: Real Stadium Club Ovetense and Real Club Deportivo Oviedo.

== Honours ==
=== National titles ===
- La Liga

Third place (3): 1934–35, 1935–36, 1962–63

- Segunda División

Winners (5): 1932–33, 1951–52, 1957–58, 1971–72, 1974–75
Runners-up (3): 1931–32, 1954–55, 1955–56

- Copa de la Liga (Segunda División)

Winners: 1984–85

- Segunda División B

Winners: 2014–15

- Tercera División

Winners (4): 2003–04, 2004–05, 2007–08, 2008–09

=== Regional titles ===
- Asturian Championship:

Real Stadium Ovetense 1924-25
Real Oviedo 1927-28, 1928-29, 1931-32, 1932-33, 1933-34, 1934-35, 1935-36

=== Friendly tournaments ===
- Trofeo Emma Cuervo (16): 1953, 1958, 1965, 1966, 1969, 1973, 1978, 1986, 1988, 1989, 1992, 1996, 2001, 2004, 2011, 2023
- Trofeo Hermanos Tarralva (10): 1975, 1976, 1978, 1979, 1980, 1984, 1988, 1992, 2005, 2006
- Trofeo Ciudad de Oviedo (8): 1982, 1984, 1985, 1987, 1988, 1991, 1992, 1995
- Trofeo Principado (6): 1989, 1990, 1992, 1995, 1996, 2007
- Trofeo Aniceto Campa (5): 2007, 2008, 2010, 2011, 2012
- Trofeo Ramón Losada (5): 2006, 2014, 2015, 2016, 2017
- Trofeo San Agustín (4): 1973, 1989, 1992, 1996
- Trofeo Conde de Fontao (3): 1972, 1978, 1979
- Trofeo Ciudad de Santander (2): 1977, 1979, 1983
- Memorial Belarmino Arbesú (3): 2009, 2010, 2011
- Trofeo Costa Verde (2): 1964, 1974
- Trofeo Treycar (2): 2007, 2009
- Trofeo Corpus de Lugo: 1960
- Trofeo Corpus de Ourense: 1973
- Trofeo Juan Acuña: 1989
- Trofeo Alcarria: 2000
- Memorial Pedro Alberto: 2008
- Trofeo Villa de Laredo: 2011
- Trofeo Ayuntamiento de Navia: 2012
- Trofeo Vallecas: 2015
- Trofeo Vila de Foz: 2018

=== Individual honours ===
==== Pichichi Trophy ====
In Spanish football, the Pichichi is the trophy awarded by Spanish sports newspaper 'Marca' to the top goalscorer for each league season.

- La Liga: Isidro Lángara (3) (1933–34, 1934–35, 1935–36), Marianín (1972–73)
- Segunda División: Isidro Lángara (1932–33), Eduardo Gómez "Lalo" (1957–58), Galán (1971–72), Carlos (1987–88), Borja Bastón (2021–22)
- Segunda División B: Miguel Linares (2014–15)
- Tercera División: Diego Cervero (3) (2004–05, 2007–08, 2008–09)

==== Zamora Trophy ====
- Segunda División: Óscar Álvarez (2) (1931–32, 1932–33), Lombardía (1971–72)
- Tercera División: Rafael Ponzo (2003–04), Oinatz Aulestia (2008–09)

== Players ==
=== Most appearances ===
	Name	Nationality	Official matches
1	Berto	(Spain)	512
2	Vili	(Spain)	403
3	Tensi	(Spain)	399
4	Toni Cuervo	(Spain)	393
5	Javier Álvarez	(Spain)	368

	Name	Nationality	La Liga matches
1	Berto	(Spain)	328
2	Antón	(Spain)	252
3	Carlos	(Spain)	240
4	Antonio Rivas	(Spain)	239
5	Emilín	(Spain)	227

=== Goalscorers ===
	Name	Nationality	Official goals
1	Isidro Lángara	(Spain)	257
2	Herrerita	(Spain)	153
3	Diego Cervero	(Spain)	141
4	Enrique Galán	(Spain)	135
5	Carlos	(Spain)	133

	Name	Nationality	La Liga goals
1	Herrerita	(Spain)	110
2	Isidro Lángara	(Spain)	105
3	Carlos	(Spain)	93
4	Antón	(Spain)	68
5	Echevarría	(Spain)	67

== Managers ==
=== Most appearances ===
	Name	Nationality	Official matches
1	Vicente Miera	(Spain)	170
2	Manuel Meana	(Spain)	158
3	Javier Irureta	(Spain)	156
4	Radomir Antić	(Serbia)	148
5	Antonio Rivas	(Spain)	134

	Name	Nationality	La Liga matches
1	Javier Irureta	(Spain)	133
2	Radomir Antić	(Serbia)	132
3	Manuel Meana	(Spain)	130
4	Vicente Miera	(Spain)	72
5	Luis Urquiri	(Spain)	60
