= 1996–97 Sporting de Gijón season =

Real Sporting
1996–97 season
- Chairman: José Fernández
- Manager: Miguel Montes
- Stadium: El Molinón
- La Liga: 15th
- Copa del Rey: Third round
- Top goalscorer: Dmitri Cheryshev (8)
- Average home league attendance: 19,219

The 1996–97 Sporting de Gijón season was the 35th season of the club in La Liga, the 21st consecutive after its last promotion.

== Overview ==
Threatened by the relegation, Benito Floro was sacked after four consecutive losses. Miguel Montes replaced him since the round 35 and finally avoided the last positions and saved the place in La Liga with a 3–0 win over Rayo Vallecano in the 41st round of 42.

== Squad ==
Note: Flags indicate national team as defined under FIFA eligibility rules; some limited exceptions apply. Players may hold more than one non-FIFA nationality.

No.	Pos.	Nation	Player
1	GK	ESP	Juan Carlos Ablanedo
2	DF	ESP	Jesús Enrique Velasco
3	DF	RUS	Yuri Nikiforov
4	DF	ESP	Pablo
5	DF	ESP	Fernando Giner
6	MF	BRA	Valtemir de Souza
7	FW	ESP	Eloy
8	MF	ESP	Ricardo Bango
9	FW	NGA	Rashidi Yekini
10	MF	RUS	Igor Lediakhov
11	MF	ESP	Tomás
13	GK	ESP	Francisco Liaño

No.	Pos.	Nation	Player
14	FW	ESP	Marcos Vales
15	FW	ESP	Julio Salinas
16	MF	ARG	Hugo Pérez
17	DF	ESP	Francisco Villarroya
18	MF	ESP	Avelino
19	FW	CRC	Ronald Gómez
20	FW	ESP	Dani Bouzas
21	FW	RUS	Dmitri Cheryshev
22	MF	ESP	Álex
23	DF	ESP	Javier Oliete
24	FW	ESP	Luna

=== From the youth squad ===
Note: Flags indicate national team as defined under FIFA eligibility rules; some limited exceptions apply. Players may hold more than one non-FIFA nationality.

No.	Pos.	Nation	Player
26	DF	ESP	Rubén Darío Acebal
27	GK	ESP	Juanjo
28	MF	ESP	David Cano
29	DF	ESP	Urbano

No.	Pos.	Nation	Player
30	DF	ESP	Sergio
31	MF	ESP	Aitor
33	FW	ESP	Rubén Blaya

== Competitions ==
=== La Liga ===
==== Results by round ====
Round	1	2	3	4	5	6	7	8	9	10	11	12	13	14	15	16	17	18	19	20	21	22	23	24	25	26	27	28	29	30	31	32	33	34	35	36	37	38	39	40	41	42
Ground	A	H	A	H	A	H	A	H	A	H	H	A	H	A	H	A	H	A	H	A	H	H	A	H	A	H	A	H	A	H	A	A	H	A	H	A	H	A	H	A	H	A
Result	W	L	D	W	L	D	W	D	L	L	D	L	L	W	L	L	D	D	L	W	D	W	L	D	L	W	L	W	L	W	L	L	L	L	D	L	W	D	W	W	W	D
Position	6	8	11	6	15	12	9	9	13	16	15	17	17	16	16	16	16	17	17	16	17	15	16	15	16	15	16	14	15	14	15	15	19	19	19	19	18	18	17	17	14	15

Source: BDFutbol
A = Away; H = Home; W = Win; D = Draw; L = Loss

==== League table ====
Pos	Team	Pld	W	D	L	GF	GA	GD	Pts
13	Racing Santander	42	11	17	14	52	54	−2	50 (Note: RAC: 9 pts; ZAR: 6 pts; SPG: 3 pts)
14	Zaragoza	42	12	14	16	58	66	−8	50
15	Sporting Gijón	42	13	11	18	45	63	−18	50
16	Celta Vigo	42	12	13	17	51	54	−3	49
17	Oviedo	42	12	12	18	49	65	−16	48

Source: LFP
Rules for classification: 1) points; 2) head-to-head points; 3) head-to-head goal difference; 4) head-to-head goals scored; 5) goal difference; 6) number of goals scored.

==== Matches ====
2 September 1996 1	Espanyol	2–3	Real Sporting	Barcelona
	Benítez 16'; Ouédec 41' (pen.)	Summary	Villarroya 67'; Velasco 81'; Bango 89'	Stadium: Sarrià; Referee: Esquinas Torres

8 September 1996 2	Real Sporting	0–1	Racing Santander	Gijón
	Cervera 34'; Diego López (red card) 53'	Summary		Stadium: El Molinón; Referee: Iturralde González

15 September 1996 3	Real Sociedad	1–1	Real Sporting	San Sebastián
	Kovačević 4'	Summary	Tomás 30'	Stadium: Anoeta; Referee: Brito Arceo

22 September 1996 4	Real Sporting	2–0	Zaragoza	Gijón
	Nikiforov 19'; Julio Salinas 29'	Summary	Nayim (red card) 82'	Stadium: El Molinón; Referee: Núñez Manrique

29 September 1996 5	Tenerife	6–0	Real Sporting	Santa Cruz de Tenerife
	Giner 7' (o.g.); Nikiforov 19' (o.g.); Juanele 36'; Jokanović 59' (pen.); Dani 77'; Llorente 88'	Summary		Stadium: Heliodoro Rodríguez López; Referee: Fernández Marín

2 October 1996 6	Real Sporting	1–1	Compostela	Gijón
	Julio Salinas 11'	Report	Penev 89'	Stadium: El Molinón; Referee: Gracia Redondo

13 October 1996 7	Logroñés	0–2	Real Sporting	Logroño
		Summary	Lediakhov 32' (pen.); Oliete 77'	Stadium: Las Gaunas; Referee: Daudén Ibáñez

21 October 1996 8	Real Sporting	1–1	Sevilla	Gijón
	Ronald Gómez 61'	Summary	Salva 10'; Aranalde (yellow card) (yellow-red card) 79'	Stadium: El Molinón; Referee: Carmona Méndez

23 October 1996 9	Valencia	2–1	Real Sporting	Valencia
	Moya 14'; Karpin 65'	Report	Bango 36'	Stadium: Mestalla; Referee: García Aranda

26 October 1996 10	Real Sporting	0–1	Atlético Madrid	Gijón
		Report	Roberto 77'	Stadium: El Molinón; Referee: Ansuategui Roca

4 November 1996 11	Real Sporting	0–0	Barcelona	Gijón
		Summary	Nadal (yellow card) (yellow-red card) 40'	Stadium: El Molinón; Referee: Andradas Asurmendi

11 November 1996 12	Valladolid	1–0	Real Sporting	Valladolid
	Víctor 55'	Report		Stadium: José Zorrilla; Referee: López de la Fuente

17 November 1996 13	Real Sporting	2–4	Athletic Bilbao	Gijón
	Sergio 9'; Julio Salinas 82'	Report	Urzaiz 5'; Guerrero 56'; Ziganda 68', 78'	Stadium: El Molinón; Referee: Prados García

23 November 1996 14	Extremadura	1–2	Real Sporting	Almendralejo
	Duré 60'	Report	Julio Salinas 49', 51'; Marcos Vales (yellow card) (yellow-red card) 89'	Stadium: Francisco de la Hera; Referee: Japón Sevilla

30 November 1996 15	Real Sporting	0–1	Real Madrid	Gijón
		Summary	Hierro 19'	Stadium: El Molinón; Referee: Puentes Leira

8 December 1996 16	Celta	2–1	Real Sporting	Vigo
	Revivo 21'; Javi González 89'	Summary	Bango 20'	Stadium: Balaídos; Referee: Carmona Méndez

22 December 1996 17	Real Sporting	1–1	Deportivo La Coruña	Gijón
	Julio Salinas 22'	Report	Rivaldo 9'	Stadium: El Molinón; Referee: López Nieto

5 January 1997 18	Hércules	1–1	Real Sporting	Alicante
	Amato 21'	Summary	Nikiforov 27'	Stadium: José Rico Pérez; Referee: Barrenechea Montero

19 January 1997 20	Rayo Vallecano	0–1	Real Sporting	Madrid
		Report	David Cano 55'	Stadium: Vallecas; Referee: Hernanz Angulo

26 January 1997 21	Sporting de Gijón	0–0	Oviedo	Gijón
		Summary		Stadium: El Molinón; Referee: Losantos Omar

2 February 1997 22	Real Sporting	4–3	Espanyol	Gijón
	Villarroya 25'; Lediakhov 42'; Luna 57'; David Cano 62'	Summary	Benítez 19'; Răducioiu 67', 77' (pen.)	Stadium: El Molinón; Referee: Esquinas Torres

9 February 1997 23	Racing Santander	2–0	Real Sporting	Santander
	Beschastnykh 14'; Esteban Torre 82'	Summary		Stadium: El Sardinero; Referee: Brito Arceo

16 February 1997 24	Real Sporting	0–0	Real Sociedad	Gijón
		Summary		Stadium: El Molinón; Referee: García Aranda

19 February 1997 25	Zaragoza	5–0	Real Sporting	Zaragoza
	Aragón 34'; Morientes 40', 43', 49'; Radimov 81'	Summary		Stadium: La Romareda; Referee: Ansuategui Roca

23 February 1997 26	Real Sporting	2–1	Tenerife	Gijón
	Luna 6', 76'	Summary	Pablo Paz 48'	Stadium: El Molinón; Referee: Fernández Marín

2 March 1997 27	Compostela	2–1	Real Sporting	Santiago de Compostela
	Penev 30'; Fabiano 56'	Summary	Cheryshev 75'	Stadium: San Lázaro; Referee: Andradas Asurmendi

6 March 1997 19	Real Sporting	2–4	Real Betis	Gijón
	Lediakhov 6'; Souza (yellow card) (yellow-red card) 27'; Cheryshev 89'	Summary	Alfonso 36', 87'; Olías 46'; Kowalczyk 75'	Stadium: El Molinón; Referee: Rodríguez Martel
Note: Match postponed from original date due to the several injuries in Real Betis

9 March 1997 28	Real Sporting	2–0	Logroñés	Gijón
	Cheryshev 39'; Marcos Vales 57'	Summary		Stadium: El Molinón; Referee: Barrenechea Montero

16 March 1997 29	Sevilla	2–1	Real Sporting	Seville
	Tsartas 49'; José Mari 86'	Summary	Ronald Gómez 89'	Stadium: Ramón Sánchez Pizjuán; Referee: Carmona Méndez

24 March 1997 30	Real Sporting	2–1	Valencia	Gijón
	Tomás 42'; Luna 47'	Summary	Karpin (yellow card) (yellow-red card) 78'; Vlaović 85'	Stadium: El Molinón; Referee: Prados García

31 March 1997 31	Atlético Madrid	2–1	Real Sporting	Madrid
	Caminero 11'; Kiko 40'	Summary	David Cano 65'	Stadium: Vicente Calderón; Referee: Barrenechea Montero

6 April 1997 32	Barcelona	4–0	Real Sporting	Barcelona
	Giovanni 13'; De la Peña 44'; Ronaldo 61'; Pizzi 89'	Summary		Stadium: Camp Nou; Referee: Megía Dávila

13 April 1997 33	Real Sporting	1–2	Valladolid	Gijón
	Sergio (red card) 80'; Cheryshev 89'	Summary	Benjamín 64'; Fernando 83'	Stadium: El Molinón; Referee: Rodríguez Martel

16 April 1997 34	Athletic Bilbao	4–0	Real Sporting	Bilbao
	Larrazábal 42' (pen.); Urzaiz 46', 57'; Guerrero 72'	Summary		Stadium: San Mamés; Referee: Japón Sevilla

20 April 1997 35	Real Sporting	1–1	Extremadura	Gijón
	Cheryshev 51'	Summary	Duré 56'	Stadium: El Molinón; Referee: Hernanz Angulo

4 May 1997 36	Real Madrid	3–1	Real Sporting	Madrid
	Šuker 38', 71'; Roberto Carlos 62'	Summary	Cheryshev 9'; Lediakhov (red card) 85'	Stadium: Santiago Bernabéu; Referee: López Nieto

11 May 1997 37	Real Sporting	2–1	Celta	Gijón
	Bango 50', 78'	Summary	Gudelj 54'	Stadium: El Molinón; Referee: Iturralde González

18 May 1997 38	Deportivo La Coruña	0–0	Real Sporting	A Coruña
		Summary		Stadium: Riazor; Referee: Losantos Omar

25 May 1997 39	Real Sporting	2–0	Hércules	Gijón
	Tomás 44'; David Cano 78'	Summary		Stadium: El Molinón; Referee: Esquinas Torres

31 May 1997 40	Real Betis	0–1	Real Sporting	Seville
		Summary	Cheryshev 56'	Stadium: Benito Villamarín; Referee: Núñez Manrique

15 June 1997 41	Real Sporting	3–0	Rayo Vallecano	Gijón
	Tomás 8'; Cheryshev 80'; Álex 89'	Summary	Muñiz (yellow card) (yellow-red card) 75'	Stadium: El Molinón; Referee: López de la Fuente

22 June 1997 42	Oviedo	0–0	Real Sporting	Oviedo
		Summary		Stadium: Carlos Tartiere; Referee: Llonch Andreu

=== Copa del Rey ===
==== Matches ====
7 November 1996 Second round First leg	Toledo	0–0	Real Sporting	Toledo
		Report		Stadium: Salto del Caballo; Referee: Esquinas Torres

26 November 1996 Second round Second leg	Real Sporting	1–0 (1–0 agg.)	Toledo	Gijón
	Eloy 15'	Report		Stadium: El Molinón; Referee: Iturralde González

8 January 1997 Third round First leg	Espanyol	4–1	Real Sporting	Barcelona
	Arteaga 44', 47'; Luis Cembranos 69'; Ouédec 72'	Report	Ronald Gómez 12'	Stadium: Sarrià; Referee: Gracia Redondo

15 January 1997 Third round Second leg	Real Sporting	2–2 (3–6 agg.)	Espanyol	Gijón
	Lediakhov 63' (pen.); Nikiforov 67'	Report	Luis Cembranos 28', 33'	Stadium: El Molinón; Referee: Fernández Marín

== Squad statistics ==
=== Appearances and goals ===
No.	Pos	Nat	Player	Total		La Liga		Copa del Rey	
No.	Pos	Nat	Player	Apps	Goals	Apps	Goals	Apps	Goals
1	GK	(Spain) ESP	Juan Carlos Ablanedo	40	0	40+0	0	0+0	0
2	DF	(Spain) ESP	Jesús Enrique Velasco	20	1	9+10	1	1+0	0
3	DF	(Russia) RUS	Yuri Nikiforov	41	3	37+1	2	3+0	1
4	DF	(Spain) ESP	Pablo	34	0	29+1	0	3+1	0
5	DF	(Spain) ESP	Fernando Giner	24	0	17+5	0	2+0	0
6	MF	(Brazil) BRA	Valtemir de Souza	21	0	17+3	0	1+0	0
7	FW	(Spain) ESP	Eloy Olaya	5	1	0+3	0	1+1	1
8	MF	(Spain) ESP	Ricardo Bango	33	5	28+3	5	1+1	0
9	FW	(Nigeria) NGA	Rashidi Yekini	4	0	2+2	0	0+0	0
10	MF	(Russia) RUS	Igor Lediakhov	39	4	33+3	3	2+1	1
11	MF	(Spain) ESP	Tomás	42	4	35+3	4	4+0	0
13	GK	(Spain) ESP	Francisco Liaño	6	0	1+1	0	4+0	0
14	FW	(Spain) ESP	Marcos Vales	41	1	34+3	1	4+0	0
15	FW	(Spain) ESP	Julio Salinas	18	6	16+0	6	1+1	0
16	MF	(Argentina) ARG	Hugo Pérez	4	0	1+2	0	0+1	0
17	DF	(Spain) ESP	Francisco Villarroya	39	2	38+0	2	1+0	0
18	MF	(Spain) ESP	Avelino	20	0	14+5	0	0+1	0
19	FW	(Costa Rica) CRC	Ronald Gómez	23	3	2+19	2	2+0	1
20	FW	(Spain) ESP	Dani Bouzas	9	0	1+7	0	1+0	0
21	FW	(Russia) RUS	Dmitri Cheryshev	30	8	14+14	8	1+1	0
22	MF	(Spain) ESP	Álex	4	1	1+3	1	0+0	0
23	DF	(Spain) ESP	Javier Oliete	24	1	10+10	1	4+0	0
24	FW	(Spain) ESP	Luna	25	4	17+6	4	1+1	0
26	DF	(Spain) ESP	Rubén Darío Acebal	13	0	11+0	0	1+1	0
27	GK	(Spain) ESP	Juanjo	1	0	1+0	0	0+0	0
28	MF	(Spain) ESP	David Cano	39	4	25+10	4	4+0	0
29	DF	(Spain) ESP	Urbano	2	0	0+1	0	0+1	0
30	DF	(Spain) ESP	Sergio	31	1	29+0	1	2+0	0
31	MF	(Spain) ESP	Aitor	1	0	0+1	0	0+0	0
33	FW	(Spain) ESP	Rubén Blaya	2	0	0+2	0	0+0	0
