= Asturian derby =

Regional association football match in Spain

- Other names: Derbi asturiano Derbi astur
- Location: Asturias
- Teams: Real Oviedo; Real Sporting de Gijón
- First meeting: Sporting 2–1 Oviedo; 1926–27 Regional Championship (5 December 1926)
- Latest meeting: Oviedo 1–1 Sporting; Segunda División (11 January 2025)
- Next meeting: TBD
- Stadiums: Carlos Tartiere (Oviedo); El Molinón (Gijón)

Statistics
- Total meetings: Official: 118; Total: 165
- Most wins: Official: Oviedo (50); Total: Oviedo (69)
- Top scorer: Herrerita (8 goals)
- Largest victory: Oviedo 8–2 Sporting; 1933–34 Regional Championship (22 October 1933); Sporting 6–0 Oviedo; 1944–45 La Liga (13 May 1945); Oviedo 6–0 Sporting; 1955–56 Segunda División (19 February 1956)
- Location of the two teams' stadium

The Asturian derby (Asturian: Derbi asturianu, Spanish: Derbi asturiano or Derbi astur) is the name given to any association football match contested between Sporting de Gijón and Real Oviedo (sometimes referred to as Carbayones), the two biggest clubs in Asturias. The rivalry is well-known as one of the strongest, and most heated in Spanish football.

== History ==
The first competitive match between the two teams happened on 5 December 1926, after the two main teams in Oviedo (Stadium Ovetense and Deportivo Oviedo) merged to create Real Oviedo. The match, in the Regional Championship of Asturias, was played in El Molinón and Sporting Gijón won by 2–1.

The first official match in the Spanish league was played in February 1929, during the 1929 Segunda División. Oviedo defeated Sporting by 6–2 with Barril scoring four goals in the second half. In 1944, the first derby in La Liga was played and the Carbayones won again 2–1.

On 27 February 1966, just after the kickoff of the derby at El Molinón, several people were injured after an avalanche occurred in one of the stands of the stadium.

On 29 May 1977 a special derby was held in Oviedo, where Sporting won by 2–1 at Estadio Carlos Tartiere in the penultimate match of the 1976–77 Segunda División, achieving promotion to La Liga and beginning the 'golden years' of the club.

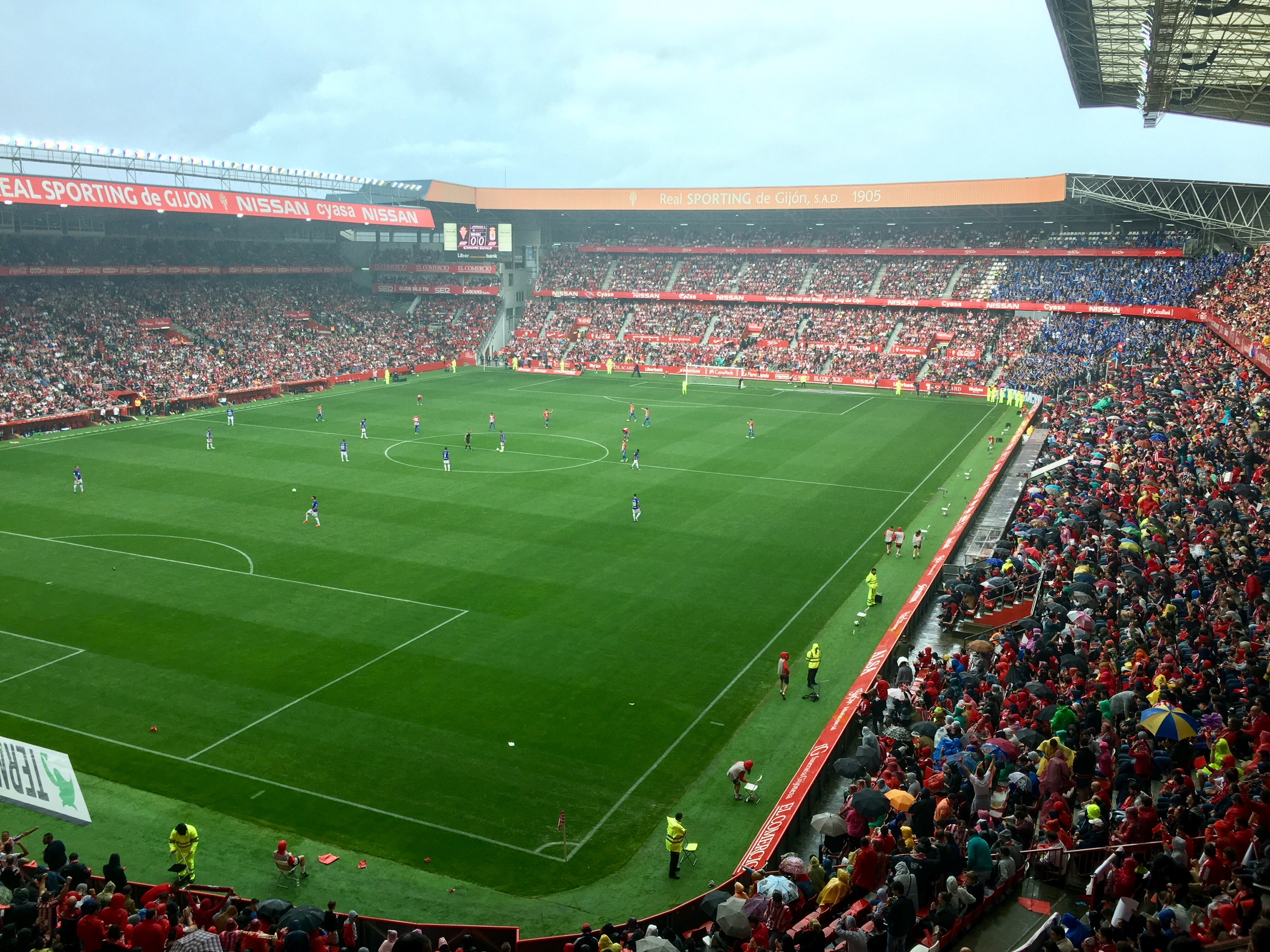
Kick off of the derby played in Gijón in 2017.

On 15 March 1998, Oviedo won 2–1 in the last derby in La Liga to date. After that season, Sporting were relegated to Segunda División with the worst performance ever in the Spanish top league. This was also the last Asturian derby played at the old Estadio Carlos Tartiere before its closure in May 2000.

The first derby at the new Estadio Carlos Tartiere was played on 28 October 2001, being the first ever sell-out for the venue; Sporting beat the locals 2–0.

In 2003, the clubs played the last derby before the relegation of Oviedo to Segunda División B, later dropped to Tercera División due to nonpayments. Oviedo won by 2–1. After Oviedo's second goal, one of the stands collapsed and several fans went onto the pitch, without any injuries. Due to this, Estadio Carlos Tartiere was closed for one game.

After Oviedo were relegated to the lower divisions, the club had to play against Sporting B for several years until their comeback to Segunda División in 2015.

Oviedo and Sporting met again on 9 September 2017, in the fourth round of the 2017–18 Segunda División, breaking the biggest gap ever (14 years) without facing each other in official competitions. The match, played in Gijón, ended with a one-goal draw. Before it, in the surroundings of the stadium, there were altercations between the National Police and the ultras of Sporting Gijón, ending with damage to the buses of both clubs and 12 persons arrested. In the second-leg match played in Carlos Tartiere, Oviedo defeated Sporting by 2–1.

The second derby of the 2019–20 season, initially dated for 29 March 2020, was postponed due to the coronavirus pandemic. It finally was played on 22 June at El Molinón, behind closed doors, and finished with the win of the carbayones by 0–1.

== The derby in the society ==
In April 2000, when both clubs were suffering acute financial trouble, there were rumours about meetings between the board of directors of both clubs to discuss a merger to create a single team in the region called Real Asturias, and to study the possibility of building a new stadium between Oviedo and Gijón. Supporters of both clubs and the vast majority of the institutions were opposed to this proposal.

In 2017, the Non-governmental organisation Asturies por África (Asturias for Africa) organised an Asturian derby in Gambia, played by local boys, to raise funds to build a new solar-powered well in the village of Ndungu Kebbeh.

== Head-to-head statistics ==
Competition	GP	RO	D	RSG	OG	SG
La Liga	40	19	13	8	42	31
Segunda División	50	16	13	21	66	75
Copa del Rey	10	7	1	2	23	17
Regional Championship	18	8	5	5	46	38
Total in official games	118	50	32	36	177	161
Trofeo Principado	19	10	4	5	23	16
Other friendly matches	25	9	6	10	39	43
Total in all games	165	69	42	51	239	220

== Head-to-head ranking in La Liga (1929–2021) ==
P.	34	35	36	41	42	43	44	45	46	47	48	49	50	52	53	54	58	59	60	61	62	63	64	65	71	72	73	74	75	76	78	79	80	81	82	83	84	85	86	87	88	89	90	91	92	93	94	95	96	97	98	99	00	01	09	10	11	12	16	17
1																																																												
2																																2																												
3		3	3																			3											3																											
4							4	4																														4		4																				
5									5			5																			5													5																
6	6					6													6																				6					6																
7								7							7																			7																										
8				8						8																										8									8															
9									9		9				9																										9						9	9												
10										10											10																																				10			
11					11													11								11																	11		11															
12																	12								12		12															12				12														
13														13						13								13									13					13	13																	
14											14		14										14				14		14						14												14		14			14			14					
15																15		15						15																										15						15				
16																16														16																16							16							
17																												17																						17									17	
18																														18																		18	18		18			18						18
19																																																										19		
20																																																			20									
21																																																												
22																																																												

•Total: Sporting with 6 higher finishes (and in top tier alone for 22 seasons), Oviedo with 14 higher finishes (and in top tier alone for 18 seasons); as of the end of the 2020–21 season.

== Records ==
=== All-time goalscorers ===
The following players have scored 3 or more league goals in the Asturian derby. This includes all La Liga, Segunda División and Copa del Rey matches.

Player	Club(s)	La Liga	Segunda	Copa	Overall	Years
Herrerita	Both clubs	2	2	4	8	1929–1933 (S), 1933–1936 (O), 1940–1950 (O), 1950–1951 (S)
Isidro Lángara	Oviedo	1	6		7	1930–1936, 1946–1948
José Prendes	Sporting	1	6		7	1948–1957
Pepe Ortiz	Sporting		7		7	1949–1963
Emilín	Both clubs	2		4	6	1933–1936 (O), 1940–1949 (O), 1949–1951 (S)
Pío	Sporting	5			5	1944–1950, 1954–1955
Cholo Dindurra	Both clubs	3		2	5	1933 (S), 1941–1942 (S), 1942–1943 (O), 1943–1953 (S)
Pin	Sporting		5		5	1924–1943
Barril	Oviedo		5		5	1926–1931
Urrutia	Oviedo		5		5	1927–1931
Miguel Ferrer	Oviedo		5		5	1954–1958
Alfonso Alarcón	Oviedo	3	1		4	1973–1978
Quini	Sporting	3	1		4	1968–1980, 1984–1987
Enrique Galán	Oviedo	2	2		4	1968–1978
Tati Valdés	Sporting	1	3		4	1965–1979
Ramón Herrera	Sporting		4		4	1925–1927, 1930–1935
Ricardo Gallart	Oviedo		3	1	4	1930–1943
David Villa	Sporting		2	2	4	2001–2003
Antón	Oviedo			4	4	1935–1936, 1940–1951
Areta II	Oviedo	3			3	1951–1954
Carlos	Oviedo	3			3	1987–1988, 1989–1996
Molinucu	Sporting	2	1		3	1944–1957
Lalo	Oviedo	1	2		3	1953–1967
Esteban Echevarría	Oviedo	1		2	3	1942–1951
Camilo Liz	Sporting	1		2	3	1942–1946
Aloy	Oviedo		3		3	1954–1958
José Luis Quirós	Oviedo		3		3	1964–1969
Mijares	Sporting			3	3	1941–1944

=== Clean sheets ===
The following goalkeepers have at least three clean sheets in the Asturian derby. This includes La Liga, Segunda División and Copa del Rey matches.

Player	Club(s)	Clean sheets	Games	Years
Viti	Oviedo	6	9	1979–1994
Jesús Castro	Sporting	5	12	1967–1985
Juan Luis Mora	Oviedo	5	6	1993–1999
Juan Carlos Ablanedo	Sporting	4	13	1982–1999
Sabino Zubeldia	Oviedo	3	3	1985–1992
Juanjo Valencia	Sporting	3	5	1999–2004
Fernando de Argila	Oviedo	3	12	1943–1952, 1952–1957
Sión	Sporting	3	12	1949–1961

== All-time results ==
=== La Liga ===
#	Season	Date	R.	Home team	Score	Away team	Att.	Oviedo scorers	Sporting scorers
1	1944–45	10 December 1944	12	Oviedo	2 – 1	Sporting		Echevarría (23), Herrerita (38)	Liz (89)
2	1944–45	13 May 1945	25	Sporting	6 – 0	Oviedo			Pío (12, 52, 61), Molinucu (14), Cervigón (67), Tamayo (76)
3	1945–46	30 December 1945	13	Sporting	1 – 0	Oviedo			Molinucu (17)
4	1945–46	31 March 1946	26	Oviedo	2 – 2	Sporting		Chas (21), Emilín (87)	Dindurra (38, 85)
5	1946–47	29 September 1946	2	Sporting	1 – 1	Oviedo		Domingo (10)	Dindurra (78)
6	1946–47	7 January 1947	15	Oviedo	3 – 2	Sporting		Diestro (25), Emilín (53), Lángara (71)	Méndez (4, 21)
7	1947–48	12 October 1947	4	Oviedo	0 – 0	Sporting			
8	1947–48	25 January 1948	17	Sporting	2 – 1	Oviedo		Herrerita (55)	Pío (42, 88)
9	1952–53	4 January 1953	14	Sporting	1 – 3	Oviedo		Areta II (10), Toni Cuervo (20), Durán (75)	Grau (89)
10	1952–53	26 April 1953	29	Oviedo	2 – 4	Sporting		Areta II (17), Basabe (23)	Germán (43), Prendes (76), Medina (77), Grau (82)
11	1953–54	13 September 1953	1	Sporting	0 – 0	Oviedo			
12	1953–54	10 January 1954	16	Oviedo	1 – 0	Sporting		Areta II (82)	
13	1958–59	16 November 1958	10	Sporting	0 – 3	Oviedo		Lalo (42), Romero (49), Emilio (o.g. 83)	
14	1958–59	15 March 1959	25	Oviedo	2 – 0	Sporting		Massey (16), Arbaizar (58)	
15	1972–73	7 January 1973	17	Oviedo	1 – 0	Sporting		Galán (20)	
16	1972–73	20 May 1973	34	Sporting	1 – 0	Oviedo			Quini (63)
17	1973–74	30 December 1973	16	Sporting	0 – 3	Oviedo		Marianín (17), Galán (31), Castro (o.g. 86)	
18	1973–74	5 May 1974	33	Oviedo	0 – 0	Sporting			
19	1975–76	28 September 1975	4	Oviedo	3 – 1	Sporting		Alarcón (8, 36, 63)	Quini (42)
20	1975–76	8 February 1976	21	Sporting	3 – 1	Oviedo		Marianín (48)	Valdés (9, 20), Quini (63)
21	1988–89	11 January 1989	17	Oviedo	1 – 0	Sporting	24,000	Tomás (81)	
22	1988–89	17 June 1989	37	Sporting	0 – 0	Oviedo	19,841		
23	1989–90	5 November 1989	10	Sporting	0 – 0	Oviedo	26,000		
24	1989–90	11 March 1990	29	Oviedo	1 – 0	Sporting	20,012	Hicks (51)	
25	1990–91	30 December 1990	16	Oviedo	0 – 0	Sporting	20,200		
26	1990–91	19 May 1991	35	Sporting	0 – 0	Oviedo	27,335		
27	1991–92	15 December 1991	14	Oviedo	1 – 0	Sporting	19,321	Bango (25)	
28	1991–92	3 May 1992	33	Sporting	1 – 0	Oviedo	25,000		Monchu (3)
29	1992–93	3 January 1993	16	Sporting	0 – 1	Oviedo	25,000	Lăcătuș (9)	
30	1992–93	29 May 1993	35	Oviedo	2 – 1	Sporting	16,003	Carlos (47, 53)	Abelardo (16)
31	1993–94	19 September 1993	3	Oviedo	0 – 1	Sporting	19,000		Juanele (78)
32	1993–94	6 February 1994	22	Sporting	0 – 0	Oviedo	26,200		
33	1994–95	22 January 1995	18	Sporting	1 – 1	Oviedo	25,300	Carlos (72)	Pier (38)
34	1994–95	11 June 1995	37	Oviedo	1 – 0	Sporting	14,553	Oli (57)	
35	1995–96	3 December 1995	15	Oviedo	1 – 0	Sporting	18,663	Bango (o.g. 89)	
36	1995–96	14 April 1996	36	Sporting	0 – 1	Oviedo	29,500	Carlos (47)	
37	1996–97	26 January 1997	21	Sporting	0 – 0	Oviedo	19,800		
38	1996–97	22 June 1997	42	Oviedo	0 – 0	Sporting	23,500		
39	1997–98	9 November 1997	10	Sporting	1 – 2	Oviedo	19,826	Juan González (18), Dely Valdés (53)	Bango (10)
40	1997–98	15 March 1998	29	Oviedo	2 – 1	Sporting	20,000	Nikiforov (o.g. 16), Dely Valdés (81)	Kaiku (8)

=== Segunda División ===
#	Season	Date	R.	Home team	Score	Away team	Att.	Oviedo scorers	Sporting scorers
1	1929	24 February 1929	2	Oviedo	6 – 2	Sporting		Urrutia (5), Barril (44, 67, 70, 77, 87)	Pin (53), Campanal
2	1929	12 May 1929	11	Sporting	3 – 2	Oviedo		Polón (33), Cara	Arcadio (25), Pin (30, 45)
3	1929–30	19 January 1930	8	Oviedo	2 – 1	Sporting		Urrutia (5), Tamargo (75)	Morís (85)
4	1929–30	23 March 1930	4	Sporting	1 – 3	Oviedo		Urrutia (15, 78), Polón (44)	Pin
5	1930–31	14 December 1930	2	Sporting	2 – 1	Oviedo		Lángara	Abdón, Chicote
6	1930–31	15 February 1931	11	Oviedo	3 – 1	Sporting		Gallart (6), Inciarte, Álamo	Pin
7	1931–32	24 January 1932	8	Sporting	3 – 3	Oviedo		Lángara (10, 32, 34)	Nani (15, 44), Herrera (70)
8	1931–32	27 March 1932	17	Oviedo	0 – 1	Sporting			Herrera (53)
9	1932–33	11 December 1932	3	Oviedo	3 – 3	Sporting		Lángara, Gallart, Galé	Herrera, Herrerita (2 goals)
10	1932–33	12 February 1933	12	Sporting	2 – 3	Oviedo		Lángara (16), Gallart (28), Inciarte (52)	Sión II (o.g. 17), Herrera (60)
11	1950–51	12 November 1950	11	Oviedo	0 – 3	Sporting			Prendes (9, 44), Campos (70)
12	1950–51	25 March 1951	28	Sporting	3 – 0	Oviedo			Prendes (36), Ortiz (76), Molinucu (82)
13	1954–55	28 November 1954	12	Sporting	4 – 3	Oviedo		Ferrer (55, 56), Duró (80)	Glaría I (5), Ortiz (30), Prendes (60, 82)
14	1954–55	13 March 1955	27	Oviedo	1 – 2	Sporting		Ferrer (11)	Ortiz (53), Prendes (75)
15	1955–56	16 October 1955	6	Oviedo	2 – 4	Sporting		Fábregas (50), Falín (60)	Biempica (22), Ortiz (55), Pineda (86, 88)
16	1955–56	19 February 1956	21	Sporting	0 – 6	Oviedo		Aloy (6, 7, 75), Lalo (17, 50), Castro (25)	
17	1956–57	9 September 1956	1	Oviedo	1 – 2	Sporting		Ferrer (36)	Alós (63), Ortiz (67)
18	1956–57	27 January 1957	20	Sporting	5 – 1	Oviedo		Ferrer (49)	Sánchez (13), Alós (26), Ortiz (61, 66), Biempica (75)
19	1965–66	21 November 1965	10	Oviedo	1 – 0	Sporting		Achuri (82)	
20	1965–66	27 February 1966	25	Sporting	1 – 0	Oviedo			Amengual (41)
21	1966–67	20 November 1966	10	Sporting	5 – 4	Oviedo		Quirós (24, 51), Elosegui (70), Icazuriaga (76)	Montes (23), Solabarrieta (30, 85), Félix (50, 64)
22	1966–67	19 March 1967	25	Oviedo	0 – 0	Sporting			
23	1967–68	29 October 1967	6	Oviedo	1 – 1	Sporting		Quirós (65)	Amengual (55)
24	1967–68	18 February 1968	21	Sporting	1 – 0	Oviedo			Pocholo (29)
23	1968–69	15 December 1968	14	Sporting	2 – 0	Oviedo			Valdés (16, 29)
24	1968–69	4 May 1969	33	Oviedo	2 – 1	Sporting		Sistiaga (36), Galán (89)	Puente (57)
25	1969–70	23 November 1969	12	Oviedo	0 – 0	Sporting			
26	1969–70	5 April 1970	31	Sporting	4 – 0	Oviedo			Valdés (30, 87), Herrero II (56), Marañón (78)
27	1976–77	2 January 1977	18	Sporting	1 – 1	Oviedo		Galán (65)	Ferrero (1)
28	1976–77	29 May 1977	37	Oviedo	1 – 2	Sporting		Alarcón (24)	Quini (28), Ferrero (84)
29	2001–02	28 October 2001	11	Oviedo	0 – 2	Sporting	30,500		Lozano (7), Villa (60)
30	2001–02	17 March 2002	32	Sporting	0 – 0	Oviedo	25,000		
31	2002–03	15 December 2002	15	Sporting	1 – 0	Oviedo	18,600		Lozano (14)
32	2002–03	18 May 2003	36	Oviedo	2 – 1	Sporting	12,306	Geni (29), Oli (56)	Villa (32)
33	2017–18	9 September 2017	4	Sporting	1 – 1	Oviedo	27,506	Toché (85)	Carmona (13)
34	2017–18	4 February 2018	25	Oviedo	2 – 1	Sporting	25,996	Mossa (31, 46)	Jony (21)
35	2018–19	17 November 2018	14	Oviedo	2 – 1	Sporting	23,175	Ibra (6), Alanís (14)	Carmona (73)
36	2018–19	24 March 2019	31	Sporting	1 – 0	Oviedo	26,748		Bolaño (o.g. 32)
37	2019–20	17 November 2019	16	Oviedo	0 – 0	Sporting	20,499		
38	2019–20	22 June 2020	34	Sporting	0 – 1	Oviedo	(Note: Match played behind closed doors due to the COVID-19 pandemic.)	Borja Sánchez (69)	
39	2020–21	11 October 2020		Oviedo	1 – 0	Sporting		Tejera (38)	
40	2020–21	17 April 2021	34	Sporting	0 – 1	Oviedo	(Note: Match played behind closed doors due to the COVID-19 pandemic.)	Johannesson (5)	
41	2021–22	9 October 2021	9	Oviedo	1 – 1	Sporting	21,053	Ahijado (29)	Đurđević (83)
42	2021–22	17 April 2022	36	Sporting	0 – 1	Oviedo	23,470	Berrocal (o.g. 78)	
43	2022–23	17 December 2022	21	Oviedo	1 – 0	Sporting	24,574	Borja Bastón (73)	
44	2022–23	13 May 2023	40	Sporting	1 – 1	Oviedo	24,790	Sergi Enrich (44)	Đurđević (50)
45	2023–24	9 September 2023	5	Oviedo	0 – 0	Sporting	22,121		
46	2023–24	10 February 2024	26	Sporting	1 – 0	Oviedo	26,794		Nacho Méndez (2)
47	2024–25	7 September 2024	4	Sporting	3 – 1	Oviedo	25,706	Ilyas (49)	Otero (20), Cote (38), Campuzano (76)
48	2024–25	11 January 2025	22	Oviedo	1 – 1	Sporting	28,123	Hassan (48)	Gelabert (78)
49	2026–27								
50	2026–27								

=== Copa del Rey ===
#	Season	Date	R.	Home team	Score	Away team	Att.	Oviedo scorers	Sporting scorers
1	1941	20 April 1941	3	Sporting	1 – 4	Oviedo		Antón (2 goals), Herrerita, Emilín	Mijares
2	1941	27 April 1941	3	Oviedo	3 – 2	Sporting		Antón, Gallart, Leixo	Acebal, Cervigón (82)
3	1942	26 April 1942	R32	Sporting	3 – 1	Oviedo		Emilín	Dindurra, Mijares (30), Acebal (75)
4	1942	3 May 1942	R32	Oviedo	3 – 1	Sporting		Goyín (10), Soladero (15), Emilín (25)	Gundemaro
5	1942	6 May 1942	R32	Oviedo	2 – 1	Sporting		Soladero, Pedrín (75)	Dindurra
6	1943	25 April 1943	3	Sporting	1 – 2	Oviedo		Antón (75), Herrerita (77)	Mijares (5)
7	1943	2 May 1943	3	Oviedo	4 – 3	Sporting		Herrerita (5), Echevarría (10, 15), Emilín (87)	Liz (35), Paladini (70), Chipía (70)
8	1944–45	11 February 1945	R16	Sporting	0 – 0	Oviedo			
9	1944–45	4 March 1945	R16	Oviedo	2 – 1	Sporting		Herrerita (80), Goyín (90)	Liz (39)
10	2001–02	10 October 2001	R64	Sporting	4 – 2	Oviedo	17,000	Óscar Álvarez (4), Geni (91)	Pablo Amo (1), David Pirri (16), Villa (42, 76)

=== Regional Championship ===
The Regional Championship of Asturias was played before La Liga was created. Every year, the winner of the tournament qualified for the Copa del Rey, in that years called Campeonato de España (Spanish Championship).

#	Edition	Date	Home team	Score	Away team	Oviedo scorers	Sporting scorers
1	1926–27	6 December 1926	Sporting	2 – 1	Oviedo		Herrera, Loredo
2	1926–27	14 February 1927	Oviedo	2 – 1	Sporting		Pin
3	1928–29	8 October 1928	Oviedo	2 – 2	Sporting		Campanal, Nani
4	1928–29	5 November 1928	Sporting	3 – 3	Oviedo		Adolfo, Campanal (2 goals)
5	1929–30	20 October 1929	Oviedo	1 – 1	Sporting		Pin
6	1929–30	17 November 1929	Sporting	4 – 2	Oviedo		Cuesta (2 goals), Pin, Pachín
7	1930–31	5 October 1930	Oviedo	1 – 2	Sporting		Chicote (2 goals)
8	1930–31	2 November 1930	Sporting	6 – 1	Oviedo		Chicote (3 goals), Nani (2 goals), Adolfo
9	1931–32	11 October 1931	Sporting	0 – 1	Oviedo		
10	1931–32	16 October 1932	Oviedo	0 – 2	Sporting		Herrera (2 goals)
11	1932–33	18 September 1932	Oviedo	5 – 1	Sporting		Herrera
12	1932–33	16 October 1932	Sporting	2 – 2	Oviedo		Herrera, Adolfo
13	1933–34	24 September 1933	Sporting	2 – 2	Oviedo		Pin (2 goals)
14	1933–34	22 October 1933	Oviedo	8 – 2	Sporting		Herrera, Iglesias
15	1934–35	30 September 1934	Sporting	2 – 3	Oviedo		Pin, Santomé
16	1934–35	18 November 1934	Oviedo	4 – 2	Sporting		Rubiera, Calleja
17	1935–36	15 September 1935	Sporting	0 – 5	Oviedo		
18	1935–36	20 October 1935	Oviedo	3 – 2	Sporting		Jaso, Rubiera

=== Trofeo Principado ===
The Trofeo Principado was a friendly tournament played from 1988 to 1996 between Sporting and Oviedo. In 1996, Real Oviedo won the tournament has been given after winning five editions. Sporting won the 1993 edition and Real Oviedo won the 1996 one after a penalty shootout.

In 2006 and 2007 the tournament was played in a single game format and both teams won one edition.

#	Edition	Date	Home team	Score	Away team	Oviedo scorers	Sporting scorers
1	I	10 August 1988	Oviedo	1 – 3	Sporting	Bango (29)	Juanma (16, 31), Villa (85)
2	II	16 August 1989	Sporting	0 – 2	Oviedo	Zúñiga (58), Bango (75)	
3	II	24 August 1989	Oviedo	2 – 1	Sporting		
4	III	21 August 1990	Oviedo	3 – 0	Sporting	Carlos (9, 70), Bango (36)	
5	III	26 August 1990	Sporting	0 – 1	Oviedo	Sarriugarte (63)	
6	IV	17 August 1991	Sporting	2 – 0	Oviedo		Muñiz (88), Juanele (95)
7	IV	21 August 1991	Oviedo	2 – 1	Sporting	Sarriugarte (41, 54)	Juanma (72)
8	V	19 August 1992	Oviedo	2 – 1	Sporting	Carlos (38), Cristóbal (62)	Juanele (6)
9	V	29 August 1992	Sporting	1 – 3	Oviedo	Lăcătuș (60, 73), Cristóbal (89)	Abelardo (32)
10	VI	13 August 1993	Sporting	1 – 2	Oviedo	Janković (39, 56)	Miner (1)
11	VI	23 August 1993	Oviedo	0 – 1	Sporting		Sabou (64)
12	VII	18 August 1994	Oviedo	0 – 1	Sporting		Pier
13	VII	26 August 1994	Sporting	1 – 1	Oviedo	Jokanović (31)	Lediakhov (49)
14	VIII	19 August 1995	Sporting	0 – 2	Oviedo		Dubovský (73), Oli (90)
15	VIII	23 August 1995	Oviedo	0 – 0	Sporting		
16	IX	9 August 1996	Oviedo	0 – 0	Sporting		
17	IX	23 August 1996	Sporting	0 – 0	Oviedo		
18	X	9 August 2006	Sporting	2 – 0	Oviedo		Barral (10, 49)
19	XI	19 September 2007	Oviedo	2 – 1	Sporting	Cervero (67), Lucas (78)	Karanka (39)

=== Other trophies and friendly matches ===
#	Trophy	Date	Home team	Score	Away team	Goals home	Goals away
1	Friendly	27 January 1929	Oviedo	1 – 0	Sporting		
2	Friendly	3 February 1929	Sporting	1 – 4	Oviedo		
3	Friendly	19 June 1933	Oviedo	3 – 3	Sporting		Herrero (2), Pin
4	Friendly	22 September 1940	Oviedo	7 – 3	Sporting		Pin, Félix, Puyol
5	Friendly	16 March 1940	Oviedo	4 – 1	Sporting		Acebal
6	Friendly	13 September 1942	Sporting	1 – 2	Oviedo	Mijares	
7	Friendly	19 August 1949	Sporting	1 – 2	Oviedo	Pío	
8	Friendly	20 September 1950	Oviedo	1 – 2	Sporting		Acebal
9	Friendly	2 September 1951	Oviedo	1 – 5	Sporting		Areitio (2), Luis Sánchez, Prendes, Campos
10	Friendly	3 June 1953	Sporting	3 – 1	Oviedo	Sánchez, Prendes, Germán	
11	Trofeo Relámpago	20 June 1957	Oviedo	0 – 0	Sporting		
12	Friendly	4 September 1960	Oviedo	5 – 0	Sporting		
13	Charity match	19 December 1963	Oviedo	0 – 3	Sporting		Solabarrieta, Alberto, Biempica
14	Trofeo Costa Verde	6 September 1964	Sporting	1 – 1	Oviedo	Pahíño (82)	Arsenio (83)
15	Charity match	13 January 1970	Sporting	0 – 1	Oviedo		
16	Trofeo Concepción Arenal	28 August 1971	Sporting	3 – 1	Oviedo	Quini (3)	
17	Trofeo Costa Verde	24 August 1974	Sporting	0 – 1	Oviedo		Galán (73)
18	Charity match	1 January 1976	Sporting	0 – 0	Oviedo		
19	Trofeo Costa Verde	14 August 1976	Sporting	3 – 0	Oviedo	Joaquín (2), Quini	
20	Charity match	19 January 1977	Sporting	3 – 3	Oviedo	Valdés, Abel, Toni	
21	Friendly	23 August 1977	Sporting	0 – 0	Oviedo		
22	Hommage to Tensi	26 August 1978	Oviedo	0 – 3	Sporting		Doria, Quini, Uría
23	Trofeo Ciudad de Oviedo	22 August 1980	Oviedo	1 – 5	Sporting	Jaime Serrano (81)	Gomes (8, 15, 37, 78, 84)
24	Trofeo Costa Verde	27 August 1982	Sporting	1 – 0	Oviedo	Ferrero(69)	
25	Trofeo Costa Verde	16 August 1985	Sporting	1 – 0	Oviedo	Cundi (15)	

== Women's Asturian derby ==
Oviedo and Sporting Gijón's women's teams play the Asturian derby since 2023, as Oviedo absorbed the main teams of Oviedo Moderno CF. Both teams play in Segunda Federación.

In the 2017–18 season, Oviedo Moderno started playing with the name of Real Oviedo and their colours. Meanwhile, Sporting Gijón had its women's team since 1995, being named Escuela de Fútbol de Mareo between 1999 and 2016 as part of a collaboration agreement with the city's town hall.

In 2023, Oviedo absorbed the main teams of Oviedo Moderno. Since this data, Oviedo and Sporting would play their first Asturian derbies with both teams being completely integrated in the structure of their clubs.

=== Head-to-head statistics ===
Competition	GP	RO	D	RSG	OG	SG
Segunda Federación	4	3	0	1	3	2
Copa de la Reina	1	0	0	1	2	4
Total	5	3	0	2	5	6

=== All matches ===
#	Tournament	Date	R.	Home team	Score	Away team
1	2023–24 2ª Fed	1 October 2023	4	Sporting	0 – 1	Oviedo
2	2023–24 2ª Fed	4 February 2024	19	Oviedo	1 – 0	Sporting
3	2024–25 Cup	11 September 2024	1	Oviedo	2 – 4	Sporting
4	2024–25 2ª Fed	23 November 2024	12	Sporting	2 – 0	Oviedo
5	2024–25 2ª Fed	13 April 2024	27	Oviedo	1 – 0	Sporting

== Games between Oviedo and Sporting B ==
=== Head-to-head statistics ===
Competition	GP	RO	D	RSG	OG	SG
Segunda División B	12	4	3	5	11	15
Tercera División	6	3	2	1	9	5
Copa del Rey	6	5	1	0	17	4
Copa Federación Asturiana	2	1	0	1	3	3
Total in official games	26	13	6	7	40	27

=== All-time results ===
#	Competition	Date	R.	Home team	Score	Away team	Attendance	Goals home	Goals away
1	1978–79 Copa del Rey	20 September 1978	1	Sporting B	0 – 0	Oviedo			
2	1978–79 Copa del Rey	12 October 1978	1	Oviedo	2 – 0	Sporting B			
3	1981–82 Copa del Rey	9 September 1981	1	Sporting B	1 – 2	Oviedo			
4	1981–82 Copa del Rey	22 September 1981	1	Oviedo	3 – 1	Sporting B			
5	1985–86 Copa del Rey	18 September 1985	1	Sporting B	0 – 5	Oviedo			
6	1985–86 Copa del Rey	26 September 1985	1	Oviedo	2 – 1	Sporting B			
7	2003–04 Tercera División	30 November 2003	14	Sporting B	1 – 3	Oviedo	6,500	Xosé (60)	Cervero (22), Fran Sosa (40), Benjamín (77)
8	2003–04 Tercera División	25 April 2004	33	Oviedo	0 – 0	Sporting B	8,297		
9	2004–05 Tercera División	14 November 2004	12	Oviedo	0 – 0	Sporting B	8,813		
10	2004–05 Tercera División	9 April 2005	31	Sporting B	2 – 1	Oviedo	4,000	Rojas (74), Omar (75)	Cervero (44)
11	2007 Copa RFEF	12 August 2007	GS	Sporting B	2 – 1	Oviedo	4,000	Carlos Álvarez (3), Nacho Cases (62)	Cervero (57)
12	2007 Copa RFEF	22 August 2007	GS	Oviedo	2 – 1	Sporting B	500 (Note: Game played at El Requexón.)	Juan Luis (24), Cervero (54)	Omar (27)
13	2007–08 Tercera División	16 September 2007	4	Oviedo	3 – 2	Sporting B	4,953	Stefan (2), Cervero, Meijide (93)	Pablo Acebal (27), Carlos Álvarez
14	2007–08 Tercera División	3 February 2008	23	Sporting B	0 – 2	Oviedo	3,500		Cervero (13), Bruno (40)
15	2009–10 Segunda División B	11 October 2009	8	Sporting B	1 – 0	Oviedo	10,850	Carlinos (58)	
16	2009–10 Segunda División B	28 February 2010	27	Oviedo	2 – 1	Sporting B	17,274	Manu Busto (53, 95)	Jony López (82)
17	2010–11 Segunda División B	26 September 2010	6	Sporting B	0 – 0	Oviedo	6,000		
18	2010–11 Segunda División B	13 February 2011	25	Oviedo	0 – 1	Sporting B	8,053		Cruz (24)
19	2011–12 Segunda División B	23 October 2011	10	Sporting B	0 – 0	Oviedo	8,000		
20	2011–12 Segunda División B	17 March 2012	29	Oviedo	2 – 1	Sporting B	10,121	Manu Busto (9), Juanpa (85)	Guerrero (80)
21	2012–13 Segunda División B	6 January 2013	19	Sporting B	4 – 1	Oviedo	6,000	Guerrero (51, 54, 73, 81)	Cervero (24)
22	2012–13 Segunda División B	19 May 2013	38	Oviedo	1 – 0	Sporting B	8,250	Javi Casares (67)	
23	2013–14 Segunda División B	8 December 2013	17	Sporting B	2 – 1	Oviedo	6,852	Pablo Pérez (45), Juan Mera (93)	Susaeta (72)
24	2013–14 Segunda División B	27 April 2014	36	Oviedo	1 – 4	Sporting B	15,132	Sergio García (63)	Jony (10), Yacine (55), Dani Ndi (57), Pablo Pérez (93)
25	2014–15 Segunda División B	24 August 2014	1	Oviedo	3 – 1	Sporting B	11,626	Generelo (40), Linares (60, 79)	Guitián (65)
26	2014–15 Segunda División B	11 January 2015	20	Sporting B	0 – 0	Oviedo	5,000		

== Games between Sporting and Oviedo B ==
=== Head-to-head statistics ===
Competition	GP	RO	D	RSG	OG	SG
Copa del Rey	4	0	0	4	1	11
Total in official games	4	0	0	4	1	11

=== All-time results ===
#	Competition	Date	R.	Home team	Score	Away team	Attendance	Oviedo B scorers	Sporting scorers
1	1983–84 Copa del Rey	12 October 1983	2	Oviedo Aficionados	0 – 1	Sporting			Eloy 88'
2	1983–84 Copa del Rey	19 October 1983	2	Sporting	4 – 1	Oviedo Aficionados		Velázquez (80)	Campuzano (18), Maceda (27), Abel (59), Cundi (83)
3	1984–85 Copa del Rey	7 November 1984	2	Oviedo B	0 – 1	Sporting			Gabi (25, o.g.)
4	1984–85 Copa del Rey	28 November 1984	2	Sporting	5 – 0	Oviedo B			Tino (8), Camuel (20), Nacho (41), Ferrero (51, 54)

== Matches between reserve teams ==
=== Head-to-head statistics ===
Competition	GP	RO	D	RSG	OG	SG
Segunda División B	24	12	4	8	33	24
Tercera División	10	2	4	4	9	12
Copa Federación	10	1	1	8	6	18
Total	44	15	9	20	48	54

=== All matches ===
#	Tournament	Date	Home team	Score	Away team
1	Tercera División	21 September 1980	Oviedo Aficionados	2 – 2	Sporting Atlético
2	Tercera División	1 February 1981	Sporting Atlético	2 – 0	Oviedo Aficionados
3	Tercera División	19 October 1986	Oviedo Aficionados	2 – 3	Sporting Atlético
4	Tercera División	1 March 1987	Sporting Atlético	1 – 0	Oviedo Aficionados
5	Tercera División	22 November 1987	Sporting Atlético	0 – 0	Oviedo Aficionados
6	Tercera División	10 April 1988	Oviedo Aficionados	2 – 1	Sporting Atlético
7	Segunda División B	9 December 1990	Sporting Atlético	3 – 3	Vetusta
8	Segunda División B	27 April 1991	Vetusta	1 – 0	Sporting Atlético
9	Segunda División B	1 December 1991	Sporting B	1 – 0	Oviedo B
10	Segunda División B	19 April 1992	Oviedo B	0 – 1	Sporting B
11	Segunda División B	21 December 1992	Oviedo B	3 – 1	Sporting B
12	Segunda División B	2 May 1993	Sporting B	1 – 0	Oviedo B
13	Segunda División B	26 September 1993	Oviedo B	1 – 0	Sporting B
14	Segunda División B	30 January 1994	Sporting B	0 – 3	Oviedo B
15	Copa Federación	1994	Oviedo B	0 – 1	Sporting B
16	Copa Federación	1994	Sporting B	3 – 1	Oviedo B
17	Segunda División B	8 January 1995	Oviedo B	2 – 1	Sporting B
18	Segunda División B	13 May 1995	Sporting B	1 – 0	Oviedo B
19	Copa Federación	1996	Oviedo B	1 – 3	Sporting B
20	Copa Federación	1996	Sporting B	3 – 0	Oviedo B
21	Segunda División B	1 September 1996	Sporting B	1 – 1	Oviedo B
22	Segunda División B	20 January 1997	Oviedo B	0 – 1	Sporting B
23	Segunda División B	3 November 1997	Oviedo B	1 – 1	Sporting B
24	Segunda División B	4 April 1999	Sporting B	0 – 4	Oviedo B
25	Segunda División B	14 November 1998	Oviedo B	0 – 1	Sporting B
26	Segunda División B	4 April 1999	Sporting B	0 – 1	Oviedo B
27	Segunda División B	19 September 1999	Sporting B	2 – 1	Oviedo B
28	Segunda División B	30 January 2000	Oviedo B	2 – 2	Sporting B
29	Segunda División B	4 November 2001	Sporting B	0 – 1	Oviedo B
30	Segunda División B	17 March 2002	Oviedo B	1 – 4	Sporting B
31	Tercera División	29 September 2002	Sporting B	2 – 1	Oviedo B
32	Tercera División	16 February 2003	Oviedo B	0 – 0	Sporting B
33	Copa Federación	30 July 2014	Sporting B	3 – 0	Oviedo B
34	Copa Federación	10 August 2014	Oviedo B	3 – 1	Sporting B
35	Copa Federación	7 August 2016	Oviedo B	1 – 2	Sporting B
36	Copa Federación	13 August 2014	Sporting B	0 – 0	Oviedo B
37	Tercera División	13 November 2016	Oviedo B	1 – 1	Sporting B
38	Tercera División	9 April 2017	Sporting B	0 – 1	Oviedo B
39	Copa Federación	2 August 2017	Oviedo B	0 – 1	Sporting B
40	Copa Federación	13 August 2017	Sporting B	1 – 0	Oviedo B
41	Segunda División B	9 September 2018	Sporting B	1 – 2	Oviedo B
42	Segunda División B	6 March 2019	Oviedo B	2 – 0	Sporting B
43	Segunda División B	20 October 2019	Sporting B	0 – 1	Oviedo B
44	Segunda División B	8 March 2020	Oviedo B	3 – 2	Sporting B

== Other Asturian derbies ==
=== Mining basins derby ===
The Mining basins derby involves Caudal and Langreo. It is one of the strongest rivalries in the region as one of the oldest.

==== Head to head ====
Competition	GP	CAU	D	UPL	CG	LG
Copa del Rey	10	5	2	3	14	13
Segunda División B	10	2	0	8	9	18

=== Avilés–Langreo rivalry ===
Langreo and Avilés hold a fierce rivalry and their games are usually designed as high-risk matches.

==== Head to head ====
Competition	GP	RA	D	UPL	AG	LG
Segunda División B	24	10	10	2	29	14

=== Gijón derby ===
Besides Sporting, Gijón Industrial and Ceares play the derby for honourably being the second team in the city.

==== Head to head ====
Competition	GP	IND	D	UCC	IG	CG
Tercera División	28	9	9	10	31	32

=== Gijón women's derby ===
Sporting Gijón and Gijón FF are the two main local teams in women's football. The firsts, part of the team's women's club, were known as Escuela de Fútbol de Mareo until 2016 and the lasts played one season in the top tier and are vinculated to UC Ceares since 2015.

On 21 April 2019 both teams played the first women's football match ever at El Molinón, with 9,700 spectators attending to it.

==== Head to head ====
Competition	GP	RSG	D	GFF	SG	GG
Segunda División	32	14	5	12	59	53

=== Other minor derbies ===
- Condal v Siero
- Derby of the Comarca de Avilés: Avilés v Marino Luanco
- Eastern Asturias derby: Llanes v Ribadesella
- Langreo derby: Langreo v Tuilla
- Low Nalón derby: Mosconia v Praviano
- Nalón derby: Asturias v Titánico
- SMRA derby: L'Entregu v San Martín
