= Fernando Zambrano =

Spanish footballer and manager

Personal information
- Full name: Fernando Bonifacio Zambrano Sánchez
- Date of birth: 23 October 1949 (age 77)
- Place of birth: El Saucejo, Spain
- Position: Midfielder

Senior career*
Years	Team	Apps	(Gls)
1971–1979	Getafe Deportivo		

Managerial career
- Rayo Vallecano (youth)
- Atlético Madrid (youth)
- San Fernando
- 1991–1992: Valdepeñas
- 1992–1993: Moscardó
- 1993–1994: Rayo Vallecano
- 1996: Rayo Vallecano
- 1997: Rayo Vallecano
- 1999–2000: Atlético Madrid B
- 2000: Atlético Madrid
- 2003: Córdoba
- 2004: Ciudad Murcia
- 2006–2008: Atlético Esquivias
- * Club domestic league appearances and goals

Fernando Bonifacio Zambrano Sánchez (born 23 October 1949) is a Spanish retired footballer who played as a midfielder, and a current manager.

== Career ==
Born in El Saucejo, Seville, Andalusia, Zambrano represented Getafe Deportivo as a player, enjoying an eight-year spell at the club which included three full seasons in Segunda División. After retiring, he started working as a manager, with Rayo Vallecano and Atlético Madrid's youth setups.

After spells at CD San Fernando, CF Valdepeñas and CDC Moscardó, Zambrano was named Rayo Vallecano manager in November 1993. Sacked in February 1994, he subsequently managed the club in two other occasions: in 1996 and 1997, with a role of director of football in the process.

In 1999 Zambrano was named Atlético Madrid B manager, with the side in Segunda División. After finishing second in the 1998–99 campaign he was maintained in charge, and after the main squad's relegation from La Liga, he was appointed first team manager on 5 June 2000.

Zambrano was relieved from his duties in October 2000, after a poor start. He subsequently resumed his career in charge of teams in the second level (Córdoba CF and Ciudad de Murcia) and a spell at Atlético Esquivias CF before it was declared bankrupt.
