= Atlético Esquivias CF =

Atlético Esquivias
- Full name: Atlético Esquivias Club de Fútbol
- Founded: 2006
- Dissolved: 2008
- Ground: La Bombonera, Esquivias, Castile-La Mancha, Spain
- Capacity: 500
- Chairman: (Spain) Francisco Fernández
- Manager: (Spain) Fernando Zambrano
- 2008–09: Tercera División – Group 18, retired
Home colours	Away colours

Atlético Esquivias was a Spanish football team based in Esquivias, in Toledo (province) in the autonomous community of Castile-La Mancha. Founded in 2006, they held home matches at Campo de Fútbol Municipal de Esquivias, known as La Bombonera, with a capacity of 500 seats.

At beginning to 2008–09 season, the club was dissolved due to its financial problems.

== Season to season ==
Season	Tier	Division	Place	Copa del Rey
2006–07	6	1ª Aut.	1st	
2007–08	5	Aut. Pref.	1st	
2008–09	4	3ª	(R)	

- 1 season in Tercera División

== Famous players ==
- (Spain) Jesús Enrique Velasco

== Notable former managers ==
- (Spain) Fernando Zambrano
