= Rafa Navarro (footballer, born 1972) =

Spanish association football player

Personal information
- Full name: Rafael Navarro Rivas
- Date of birth: 10 January 1972 (age 54)
- Place of birth: Córdoba, Spain
- Height: 1.83 m (6 ft 0 in)
- Position: Winger

Youth career
- Córdoba
- 1989–1991: Sevilla

Senior career*
Years	Team	Apps	(Gls)
1991–1994	Córdoba	46	(7)
1994–1995	Jaén	24	(2)
1995–1997	Sporting Gijón	0	(0)
1996–1997	→ Villarreal (loan)	8	(0)
1997–1998	Recreativo	32	(0)
1998–2003	Córdoba	91	(5)
2003–2004	Ceuta	42	(5)
2004–2005	Linares	10	(0)
2005–2006	Villanueva	26	(0)
2006	Lucena	?	(0)
2006–2007	Iliturgi	?	(5)
Total		279	(24)

Managerial career
- 2008: Córdoba B (assistant)
- 2008–2009: Córdoba (assistant)
- 2010–2012: Córdoba (youth)
- 2012–2013: Séneca (youth)
- 2013–2018: Atlético Espeleño
- 2019: Córdoba
- * Club domestic league appearances and goals

Rafael "Rafa" Navarro Rivas (born 10 January 1972) is a Spanish retired footballer who played as a winger, and is a manager.

== Playing career ==
Born in Córdoba, Andalusia, Navarro joined Sevilla FC's youth setup at the age of 17, from Córdoba CF. In 1991, after finishing his formation, he returned to his previous club and was assigned to the main squad in Segunda División B.

For the 1995–96 campaign, Navarro moved straight to La Liga, joining Sporting de Gijón after a one-year spell at Real Jaén in the third division. However, he only featured in two Copa del Rey matches for the side before being loaned to Segunda División side Villarreal CF.

After featuring sparingly, Navarro left the Rojiblancos and moved to Recreativo de Huelva in the third division, in 1997. The following year, he rejoined his first club Córdoba, featuring regularly and helping in the club's promotion to the second level in 1999.

In December 2002, after being deemed surplus to requirements at the Blanquiverdes, he was linked with a move to Scottish side Livingston. Navarro joined AD Ceuta in the third tier. He went on to resume his career mainly in that division in the following years, representing CD Linares, CD Villanueva, Lucena CF and CD Iliturgi; he retired with the latter in 2007, aged 35.

== Managerial career ==
In 2008, shortly after his retirement, Navarro worked as an assistant coach of Córdoba's B and first teams. He left in 2009, but returned in the following year as manager of the youth categories.

In 2013, Navarro took over CA Espeleño in the regional leagues, achieving promotion to Tercera División with the club in 2016. He left the club in June 2018, subsequently returning to Córdoba on 28 September of that year as a director of the youth setup.

On 25 February 2019, Navarro was appointed at the helm of the Blanquiverdes' first team, replacing sacked Curro Torres. He left at the end of the season following their relegation to Segunda B but remained employed by the club.

== Managerial statistics ==
As of match played 8 June 2019

Managerial record by team and tenure
Team	Nat	From	To	Record								Ref
Team	Nat	From	To	G	W	D	L	GF	GA	GD	Win %	Ref
Atlético Espeleño	(Spain)	1 July 2013	9 June 2018	178	91	44	43	306	190	+116	51.12	
Córdoba	(Spain)	25 February 2019	12 June 2019	15	3	4	8	16	29	−13	20.00	
Total				193	94	48	51	322	219	+103	48.70	—
