= Tensi =

Spanish footballer

Personal information
- Full name: Hortensio Fernández Extravis
- Date of birth: 22 December 1946
- Place of birth: Las Piezas, Langreo, Spain
- Date of death: 11 July 2011 (aged 64)
- Place of death: Oviedo, Spain
- Position: Centre-back

Youth career
- 1964–1965: Real Oviedo

Senior career*
Years	Team	Apps	(Gls)
1965–1978	Real Oviedo	354	(14)

Managerial career
- 1980–1983: Real Oviedo (technical secretary)
- 1994–2003: Real Oviedo (assistant)
- * Club domestic league appearances and goals

Hortensio Fernández Extravis, also known as Tensi, was a Spanish former footballer who played as a centre-back. He played for 14 years for Real Oviedo.

He is the third most capped player has worn the shirt of Oviedo. Tensi also captained the club for many years.

== See also ==
- List of one-club men
