= Antón (footballer) =

Spanish footballer

Personal information
- Full name: Antonio Sánchez Valdés
- Date of birth: 2 July 1914
- Place of birth: Oviedo, Spain
- Date of death: 30 October 2005 (aged 91)
- Place of death: Oviedo, Spain
- Position: Forward

Youth career
- 1927–1935: Oviedo

Senior career*
Years	Team	Apps	(Gls)
1935–1950	Oviedo	252	(68)
1939–1940	→ Zaragoza (loan)	21	(10)
1950–1951	La Felguera		

Managerial career
- Santiago Aller
- Caudal
- Vetusta
- 1962: Oviedo (interim)
- 1966: Oviedo (interim)
- * Club domestic league appearances and goals

Antonio Sánchez Valdés, also known as Antón, was a Spanish former footballer who played as a forward. He´s the fourth highest scorer in Real Oviedo history in Primera División.
