= Jesús Velasco =

Spanish footballer

Personal information
- Full name: Jesús Enrique Velasco Muñoz
- Date of birth: 16 January 1972 (age 54)
- Place of birth: Madrid, Spain
- Height: 1.74 m (5 ft 9 in)
- Position: Right-back

Youth career
- Real Madrid

Senior career*
Years	Team	Apps	(Gls)
1991–1994	Real Madrid B	87	(11)
1994	Real Madrid	8	(0)
1994–1998	Sporting Gijón	99	(4)
1998–1999	Real Madrid B	27	(3)
1999–2002	Salamanca	75	(2)
2002–2005	Numancia	81	(1)
2005–2006	Las Rozas		
2006	S.S. Reyes	13	(0)
2006–2007	Atlético Pinto		
2007–2008	Esquivias		
Total		390+	(21+)

International career
1989–1990	Spain U18	9	(1)
1991	Spain U19	1	(0)
1990–1991	Spain U20	5	(0)
1992–1994	Spain U21	17	(0)
Medal record
Men's football
Representing Spain
UEFA European Under-21 Championship
Bronze medal – third place	1994 France
- * Club domestic league appearances and goals

Jesús Enrique Velasco Muñoz (born 16 January 1972 in Madrid) is a Spanish former professional footballer who played as a right-back.

== Honours ==
Spain U21

- UEFA European Under-21 Championship third place: 1994
