= Diego Cervero =

Spanish footballer (born 1983)

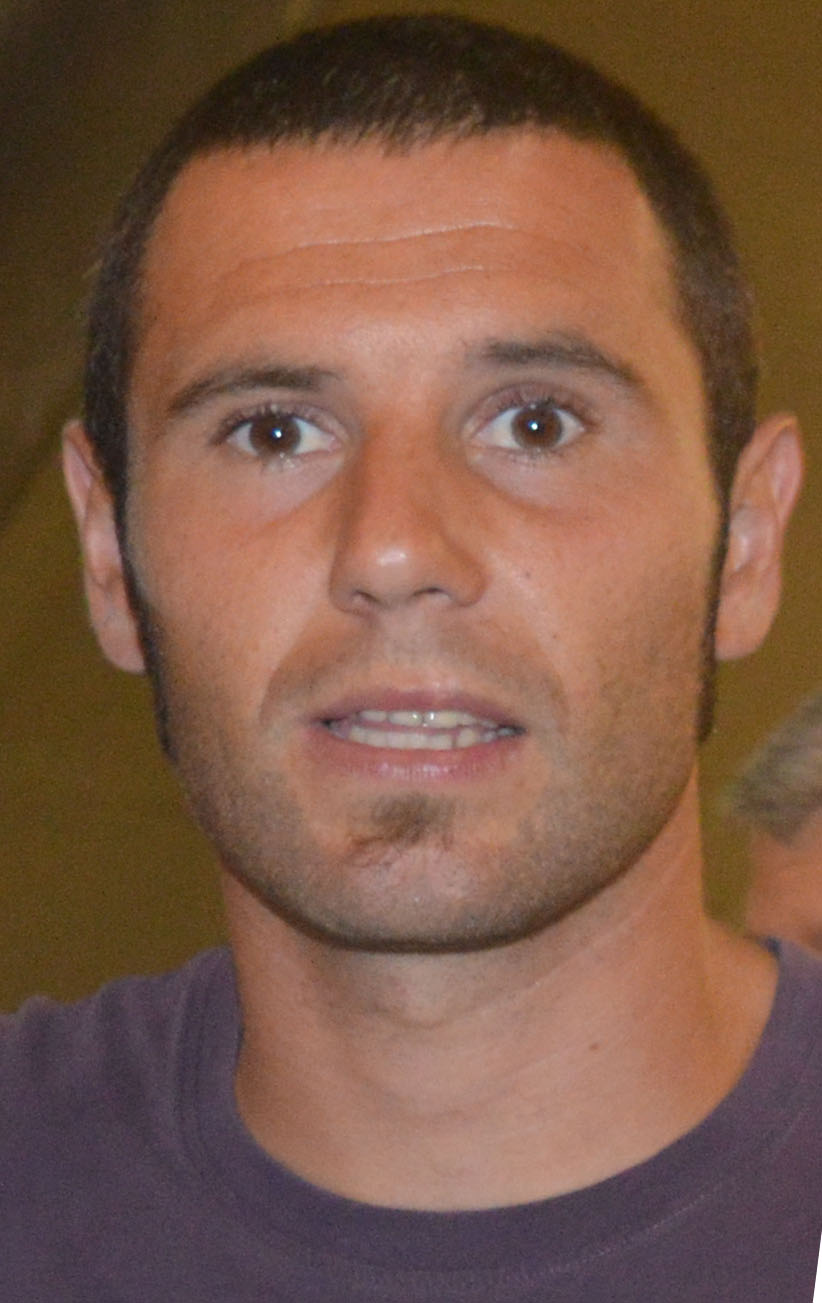
- Cervero in 2015

Personal information
- Full name: Diego Cervero Otero
- Date of birth: 13 August 1983 (age 43)
- Place of birth: Oviedo, Spain
- Height: 1.86 m (6 ft 1 in)
- Position: Centre-forward

Youth career
- 1993–2003: Oviedo

Senior career*
Years	Team	Apps	(Gls)
2001–2003	Oviedo B	52	(13)
2003–2006	Oviedo	92	(31)
2006	Marbella	6	(0)
2006–2007	Lealtad	22	(9)
2007–2009	Oviedo	76	(63)
2009–2012	Logroñés	108	(50)
2012–2016	Oviedo	102	(41)
2016–2017	Fuenlabrada	26	(7)
2017–2018	Mirandés	37	(23)
2018–2019	Burgos	35	(6)
2019–2020	Atlético Baleares	8	(0)
2020	Barakaldo	6	(6)
2020–2022	Sanluqueño	38	(6)
2022	Numancia	13	(2)
Total		621	(257)
- * Club domestic league appearances and goals

Diego Cervero Otero (born 13 August 1983) is a Spanish former footballer who played as a centre-forward.

He spent most of his career with Oviedo, representing the club in Segunda División, Segunda División B and Tercera División. In the second competition, he played 363 games and scored 140 goals.

== Playing career ==
Born in Oviedo, Asturias, Cervero graduated from Real Oviedo's youth setup, and made his senior debut with the reserves in the 2000–01 season, in Tercera División. In the summer of 2003 he was promoted to the main squad, now also in the fourth division, appearing regularly for the side over a three-year spell.

In August 2006, Cervero went on a trial at Oldham Athletic after turning down a new contract from Oviedo. However, nothing came of it and he moved to UD Marbella, signing in the subsequent transfer window with CD Lealtad.

Cervero returned to Oviedo in July 2007, and scored a career-best 35 goals in the 2008–09 campaign. On 15 July 2009, he signed a three-year deal with Segunda División B's UD Logroñés.

On 5 July 2012, Cervero returned to his former club Oviedo after agreeing to a three-year contract. He renewed his link in June 2014, also accepting a pay cut. For most of his stint, he acted as team captain.

Cervero made his Segunda División debut on 23 August 2015, aged 32, coming on as a late substitute for Miguel Linares in a 2–2 home draw against CD Lugo. He returned to the third tier in August 2016, signing for CF Fuenlabrada. After reaching the play-offs, he moved one year later to CD Mirandés, where he was the group's top scorer with 23 goals in his debut campaign, yet his side failed to promote at the same hurdle.

On 6 September 2018, the 35-year-old Cervero joined Burgos CF also in the third division. He continued to compete at that level the following years, with CD Atlético Baleares, Barakaldo CF and Atlético Sanluqueño CF.

In February 2022, Cervero moved to the newly created Segunda División RFEF with CD Numancia. In May, after finishing first in the group and being promoted to the Primera División RFEF, he announced his retirement from football.

== Post-retirement ==
After retiring, Cervero majored in sports medicine from the University of Oviedo. In that capacity, he worked with Sanluqueño and Oviedo.

== Personal life ==
Like his father Rafael, Cervero was a qualified doctor. The former was also the Spanish record-holder for the hammer throw in the 1950s.

== Honours ==
Oviedo

- Segunda División B: 2014–15
