= Aitor Tornavaca =

Spanish footballer

Aitor
Personal information
- Full name: Aitor Tornavaca Fernández
- Date of birth: 24 March 1976 (age 50)
- Place of birth: Vitoria, Spain
- Height: 1.75 m (5 ft 9 in)
- Position: Midfielder

Youth career
- Aurrerá
- 1993–1994: Sporting Gijón

Senior career*
Years	Team	Apps	(Gls)
1994–1997	Sporting Gijón B	90	(10)
1995–2000	Sporting Gijón	18	(2)
1997–1998	→ Leganés (loan)	19	(2)
1998–1999	→ Levante (loan)	33	(1)
2000–2002	Jaén	60	(1)
2002–2004	Eibar	59	(5)
2004–2012	Recreativo	277	(11)
2012–2013	Avilés	36	(1)
2014–2016	Llanes	51	(6)
2016–2017	Llanera	12	(3)
2017–2018	Llanes	10	(2)
2018–2020	Condal	63	(1)
Total		728	(45)
- * Club domestic league appearances and goals

Aitor Tornavaca Fernández (born 24 March 1976), known simply as Aitor, is a Spanish former professional footballer who played mainly as a left midfielder.

He amassed Segunda División totals of 328 games and 16 goals over 11 seasons, representing five clubs, mainly Recreativo de Huelva. He added 105 matches and five goals in La Liga, where he appeared for Recreativo and Sporting de Gijón.

== Club career ==
Aitor was born in Vitoria-Gasteiz, Álava, Basque Country. During his early career he played almost exclusively in the Segunda División, representing Sporting de Gijón, CD Leganés, Levante UD, Real Jaén and SD Eibar and moving to Recreativo de Huelva for the 2004–05 campaign. He appeared in two La Liga games with the first club, scoring against Real Valladolid in a 4–2 home win on 29 October 1995.

At Recre, Aitor was first choice from the start, being instrumental in the Andalusian side's 2006 promotion and also a regular in the top tier (never played less than 30 league matches in his eight-year spell). He was also deployed several times as a left-back.

On 12 July 2012, after three seasons in division two and 294 competitive appearances for Recreativo, the 36-year-old Aitor returned to Asturias and joined Real Avilés CF of Segunda División B, signing a two-year contract but retiring at the end of his first, following which he immediately joined the club's coaching staff.

Aitor returned to active on 14 June 2014, agreeing to a deal at CD Llanes in the Tercera División.
