= Trofeo Villa de Gijón =

Annual friendly football tournament

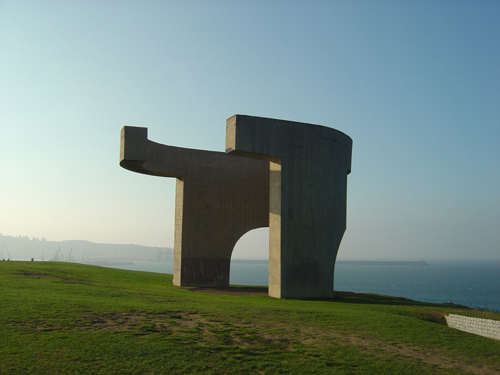
Since the tournament is called Villa de Gijón, the trophy is a rendering of the monument Elogio del Horizonte of Eduardo Chillida.

The Trofeo Villa de Gijón, called Trofeo Costa Verde until 1992, is a friendly association football tournament played annually since 1962 in Estadio Municipal El Molinón in Gijón, Asturias, Spain. The tournament is played between Spanish club Sporting Gijón and one or more invited teams.

The tournament was suspended in the following years:

- 1971: Suspended due to the works to change the pitch.
- 1981: Suspended due to the expansion of the stadium for the 1982 FIFA World Cup.
- 1987: The tournament was changed by a tribute to Quini.
- 1995: Suspended due to the financial crisis of Sporting Gijón.
- 2009 and 2010: Suspended due to the renovation of the stadium.
- 2017 and 2018: Suspended due to the works to change the pitch.

== Results ==
Year	Winners	Runners-Up	Scores	Third Place	Fourth Place
Trofeo Costa Verde
1962	(Spain) Sporting Gijón	(Spain) Osasuna	2–2		
1963	(Spain) Sporting Gijón	(Spain) Athletic Bilbao	1–0		
1964	(Spain) Oviedo	(Spain) Sporting Gijón	1–1		
1965	(Spain) Sporting Gijón	(Portugal) Belenenses	3–1		
1966	(Portugal) Vitória de Setúbal	(Spain) Sporting Gijón	3–1		
1967	(France) Angoulême	(Spain) Sporting Gijón	2–1		
1968	(Spain) Deportivo La Coruña	(Spain) Sporting Gijón	3–2		
1969	(Spain) Real Sociedad	(Spain) Sporting Gijón	1–0		
1970	(Spain) Sporting Gijón	(Portugal) Vitória de Setúbal	VIT 2–2 BEL; SPG 3–2 VIT; SPG 5–1 BEL	(Portugal) Belenenses	
1972	(Spain) Sporting Gijón	(Germany) Hamburger SV	1–0		
1973	(Germany) 1. FC Köln	(Spain) Sporting Gijón	SPG 1–2 KÖLN; KÖLN 1–0 VEL; SPG 2–1 VEL	(Socialist Federal Republic of Yugoslavia) Velež Mostar	
1974	(Spain) Oviedo	(Spain) Sporting Gijón	OVI 2–1 MTK; SPG 0–1 OVI	(Hungary) MTK Budapest	
1975	(Spain) Sporting Gijón	(Bulgaria) CSKA Sofia	SPG 1–0 ENS; ENS 1–2 CSKA; SPG 2–2 CSKA	(Spain) Ensidesa	
1976	(Spain) Sporting Gijón	(Spain) Oviedo	3–0		
1977	(Spain) Sporting Gijón	(Hungary) Videoton	SPG 4–1 VIT; VID 2–2 VIT; SPG 4–1 VID	(Portugal) Vitória de Guimarães	
1978	(Spain) Sporting Gijón	(Soviet Union) Lokomotiv Moscow	4–1	Austria Wien	(Spain) Racing Santander
1979	(Spain) Sporting Gijón	(Belgium) White Star Woluwe	SPG 2–0 WHI; BEL 0–1 WHI; SPG 3–2 BEL	(Socialist Federal Republic of Yugoslavia) Red Star Belgrade	
1980	(Netherlands) AZ	(Spain) Sporting Gijón	3–2	(Portugal) Porto	(Bulgaria) Levski Sofia
1982	(Socialist Federal Republic of Yugoslavia) Red Star Belgrade	(Spain) Sporting Gijón	1–0	(Spain) Barcelona	(Spain) Oviedo
1983	(Soviet Union) Spartak Moscow	(Spain) Atlético Madrid	2–1	(Spain) Sporting Gijón	(Germany) 1. FC Köln
1984	(Spain) Sporting Gijón	(Spain) Real Sociedad	1–0	(Romania) Steaua București	(Netherlands) Groningen
1985	(Spain) Sporting Gijón	(Spain) Oviedo	SPG 3–2 SPA; OVI 4–0 SPA; SPG 1–0 OVI	(Netherlands) Sparta Rotterdam	
1986	(Spain) Sporting Gijón	(Belgium) Standard Liège	SPG 3–1 STA; OVI 0–1 STA; SPG 2–1 OVI	(Spain) Oviedo	
1988	(Spain) Sporting Gijón	(Spain) Valencia	3–0		
1989	(Spain) Sporting Gijón	(Bulgaria) Vitosha	2–2		
1990	(Spain) Sporting Gijón	(Portugal) Sporting CP	SPG 1–0 SCP; AVI 1–1 SCP; SPG 2–0 AVI	(Spain) Avilés	
1991	(Spain) Sporting Gijón	(England) Crystal Palace	SPG 5–0 LEV; CRY 3–1 LEV; SPG 2–2 CRY	(Bulgaria) Levski Sofia	
1992	(Spain) Sporting Gijón	(Ukraine) Tavriya Simferopol	SPG 2–0 VIT; VIT 3–3 TAV; SPG 2–1 TAV	(Netherlands) Vitesse	
Trofeo Villa de Gijón
1994	(Russia) CSKA Moscow	(Spain) Sporting Gijón	SPG 1–1 TEN; SPG 1–2 CSKA; TEN 0–1 CSKA	(Spain) Tenerife	Triangular 45-minute game
1996	(Spain) Sporting Gijón	(Spain) Real Madrid	2–1		
1997	(Spain) Real Betis	(Spain) Sporting Gijón	3–1		
1998	(Spain) Valladolid	(Spain) Sporting Gijón	2–1		
1999	(Spain) Racing Santander	(Spain) Sporting Gijón	2–1		
2000	(Spain) Real Sociedad	(Spain) Sporting Gijón	SPG 0–0 ZAR; SPG 0–1 RSO; ZAR 0–1 RSO	(Spain) Zaragoza	Triangular 45-minute game
2001	(Spain) Sporting Gijón	(Spain) Racing Santander	2–0		
2002	(Spain) Sporting Gijón	(Spain) Racing Santander	0–0		
2003	(Spain) Tenerife	(Spain) Sporting Gijón	2–1		
2004	(Spain) Racing Santander	(Spain) Sporting Gijón	1–1		
2005	(Spain) Athletic Bilbao	(Spain) Sporting Gijón	1–2		
2006	(Spain) Racing Santander	(Spain) Sporting Gijón	0–0		
2007	(Spain) Racing Santander	(Spain) Sporting Gijón	0–0 (4–3 p)		
2008	(Spain) Sporting Gijón	(Italy) Milan	2–0		
2011	(Italy) Genoa	(Spain) Sporting Gijón	2–1		
2012	(Portugal) Vitória de Guimarães	(Spain) Sporting Gijón	2–0		
2013	(Spain) Villarreal	(Spain) Sporting Gijón	4–1		
2014	(Spain) Sporting Gijón	(Spain) Getafe	0–0		
2015	(Spain) Sporting Gijón	(Italy) Palermo	3–1		
2016	(Spain) Sporting Gijón	(Spain) Deportivo La Coruña	1–1 (4–2 p)		

== List of winners ==
Team	Titles	Years won
(Spain) Sporting Gijón	25	1962, 1963, 1965, 1970, 1972, 1975, 1976, 1977, 1978, 1979, 1984, 1985, 1986, 1988, 1989, 1990, 1991, 1992, 1996, 2001, 2002, 2008, 2014, 2015, 2016
(Spain) Racing Santander	4	1999, 2004, 2006, 2007
(Spain) Oviedo	2	1964, 1974
(Spain) Real Sociedad	2	1969, 2000
(Portugal) Vitória de Setúbal	1	1966
(France) Angoulême	1	1967
(Spain) Deportivo La Coruña	1	1968
(Germany) 1. FC Köln	1	1973
(Netherlands) AZ	1	1980
(Socialist Federal Republic of Yugoslavia) Red Star Belgrade	1	1982
(Soviet Union) Spartak Moscow	1	1983
(Russia) CSKA Moscow	1	1994
(Spain) Real Betis	1	1997
(Spain) Valladolid	1	1998
(Spain) Tenerife	1	2003
(Spain) Athletic Bilbao	1	2005
(Italy) Genoa	1	2011
(Portugal) Vitória de Guimarães	1	2012
(Spain) Villarreal	1	2013
