= Dani Bouzas =

Spanish footballer (born 1974)

Personal information
- Full name: Daniel Bouzas Pan
- Date of birth: 21 January 1974 (age 52)
- Place of birth: Arteixo, Spain
- Height: 1.74 m (5 ft 9 in)
- Position: Right midfielder

Senior career*
Years	Team	Apps	(Gls)
1993–1994	Fuenlabrada		
1994–1995	Sporting B	22	(5)
1994–1996	Sporting Gijón	54	(1)
1996–1999	Albacete	71	(7)
1999–2001	Rayo Vallecano	5	(0)
2000	→ Toledo (loan)	14	(2)
2001–2002	Castellón	29	(2)
2002–2004	Logroñés	68	(6)
2004–2009	Linares	170	(8)
2009–2010	Alavés	27	(4)
2010–2011	Móstoles	30	(4)
Total		490	(39)
- * Club domestic league appearances and goals

Daniel 'Dani' Bouzas Pan (born 21 January 1974) is a Spanish retired professional footballer who played as a right midfielder.

== Football career ==
Born in Arteixo, Province of A Coruña, Galicia, Bouzas made his professional debuts in 1994 with Sporting de Gijón, being irregularly used over the course of two-and-a-half La Liga seasons. In December 1996 he moved to the second division with Albacete Balompié, again with inconsistent results – he only played 16 matches out of 42 in his final year.

Bouzas returned to the top level again, signing with Rayo Vallecano, but only appeared five times in his two-season spell, which also included a loan at CD Toledo. His career would then be resumed in the third division, with CD Castellón, CD Logroñés (two years), CD Linares (five) and Deportivo Alavés.
