= Hugo Pérez (footballer, born 1968) =

Argentine footballer

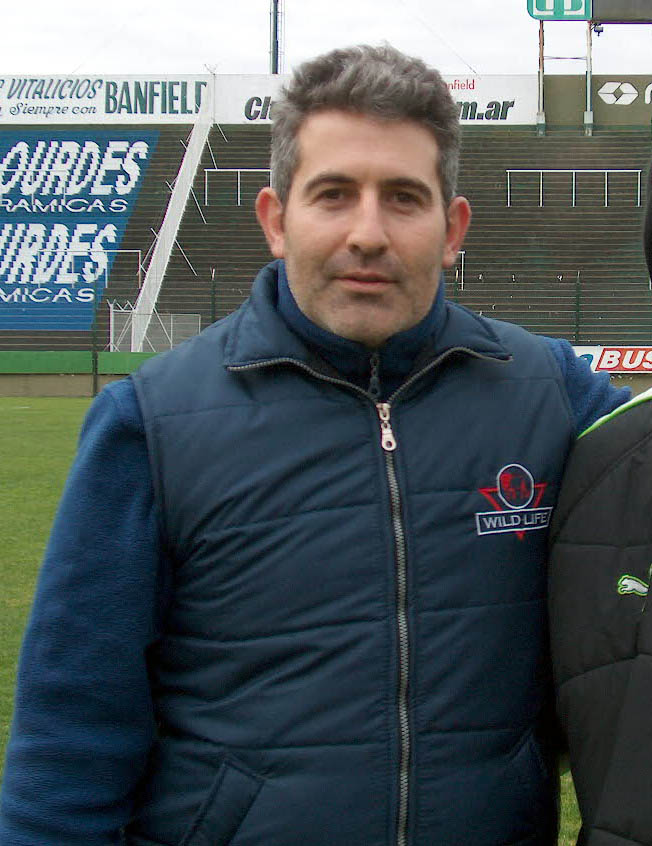
- Pérez in 2004

Personal information
- Full name: Hugo Leonardo "Perico" Pérez
- Date of birth: 6 October 1968 (age 58)
- Place of birth: Avellaneda, Argentina
- Height: 1.78 m (5 ft 10 in)
- Position: Centre midfielder

Senior career*
Years	Team	Apps	(Gls)
1987–1991	Racing Club	21	(4)
1991–1992	Ferro Carril Oeste	36	(2)
1992–1994	Independiente	75	(15)
1994–1997	Real Sporting de Gijón	57	(5)
1997–1998	Estudiantes (LP)	20	(1)
Total		209	(27)

International career
1993–1995	Argentina	14	(3)
- * Club domestic league appearances and goals as of June 2007

Hugo Leonardo Pérez (born 6 October 1968) is an Argentine former footballer who played as a midfielder. He played for both of the Avellaneda giants; Racing Club and Club Atlético Independiente.

He also played club football for Ferro Carril Oeste and Estudiantes de La Plata in Argentina and Real Sporting de Gijón in Spain.

Pérez was part of the Argentina squad for the 1994 FIFA World Cup.
