= Herrerita (footballer, born 1914) =

Spanish footballer (1914–1991)

Personal information
- Full name: Eduardo Herrera Bueno
- Date of birth: July 5, 1914
- Place of birth: Gijón, Spain
- Date of death: August 15, 1991 (aged 77)
- Position: Forward

Senior career*
Years	Team	Apps	(Gls)
1931–1933	Sporting Gijón	13	(8)
1933–1936	Real Oviedo	57	(31)
1939–1940	Barcelona	17	(9)
1940–1950	Real Oviedo	155	(79)
1950–1951	Real Gijón	5	(3)

International career^{‡}
1934–1947	Spain	6	(2)
- * Club domestic league appearances and goals as of 03:51, 27 May 2021 (UTC) ‡ National team caps and goals as of 03:51, 27 May 2021 (UTC)

Eduardo Herrera Bueno (5 July 1914 – 15 August 1991), known as Herrerita, was a Spanish footballer who played as a forward.

He was Real Oviedo's all-time top scorer in La Liga, with 117 goals in 213 games.

== Club career ==
Born in Gijón, Asturias as the youngest of eight siblings, Herrerita played youth football with local Sporting de Gijón. In 1933 he moved to the professionals, joining neighbouring Real Oviedo for a then-record 30.000 pesetas and finishing his first season in La Liga with 11 goals in only 18 games.

During the better part of the following 15 years, Herrerita would be part of an attacking line that would be dubbed Delanteras Eléctricas (Electric Forwards), also including the likes of Casuco, Emilín, Ricardo Gallart and Isidro Lángara. The players combined for an astonishing 174 goals in 62 matches in their first three seasons together.

The competition was resumed in 1939–40 following the Spanish Civil War, but Oviedo could not take part in the tournament due to the state in which the city was left after the conflict. Thus, Herrera and Emilín signed for FC Barcelona for that campaign, with the Catalans only ranking in ninth place.

Returned to Oviedo, Herrerita continued to feature and score regularly for the team, helping it to four five-place finishes from 1943 to 1949. In the latter season, he netted 12 goals in only 15 contests, but featured only twice in the following year as the Carbayones eventually suffered relegation; in 13 years, he appeared in 270 official games for his main side.

In 1950, Herrerita returned to his first club Sporting, playing one season in Segunda División and retiring afterwards. Subsequently, he acted as assistant manager with Oviedo, and died on 15 August 1991 at the age of 77.

== International career ==
Herrerita played six games with Spain, during three years. His debut came on 18 March 1934, in a 2–1 friendly win in Portugal.

== Personal life ==
Herrerita's son, Jesús, was also a footballer and a forward. He too represented Oviedo, and played in the top division with Real Madrid and Real Sociedad.
