= Carlos Muñoz (footballer, born 1961) =

Spanish footballer

Carlos
Personal information
- Full name: Carlos Antonio Muñoz Cobo
- Date of birth: 25 August 1961 (age 65)
- Place of birth: Úbeda, Spain
- Height: 1.75 m (5 ft 9 in)
- Position: Striker

Youth career
- Santa Eulalia
- Juventud Hospitalet
- Polvoritense

Senior career*
Years	Team	Apps	(Gls)
1980–1983	Igualada		
1983–1985	Barcelona B	29	(12)
1985–1988	Barcelona	0	(0)
1985	→ Elche (loan)	12	(5)
1985–1986	→ Hércules (loan)	20	(5)
1986–1987	→ Murcia (loan)	21	(4)
1987–1988	→ Oviedo (loan)	34	(25)
1988–1989	Atlético Madrid	21	(4)
1989–1996	Oviedo	240	(93)
1996–1998	Puebla	51	(33)
2000–2001	Lobos BUAP	52	(25)
Total		480	(206)

International career
1990–1991	Spain	6	(6)
- * Club domestic league appearances and goals

Carlos Antonio Muñoz Cobo (born 25 August 1961), known simply as Carlos, is a Spanish former professional footballer who played as a striker.

He represented seven clubs in his country, mainly Oviedo, moving to Mexico well into his 30s where he continued to score at an excellent rate. Over 11 seasons, he amassed La Liga totals of 314 matches and 111 goals.

Carlos was a Spain international in the early 1990s.

== Early years ==
Carlos was born in Úbeda, Andalusia. At the age of 7, he moved to Catalonia with his family for working purposes, beginning his career with local amateur clubs and making his senior debut in the Tercera División with CF Igualada.

In 1981, Carlos moved to Cádiz for his military service, going on to spend one year out of football as Cádiz CF tried to acquire him, being denied by Igualada.

== Club career ==
In 1983, Carlos signed for FC Barcelona, going on to appear almost exclusively for its reserves during his spell – he did compete with the first team in the Copa de la Liga – and also being consecutively loaned to Elche CF, Hércules CF and Real Murcia CF, all in La Liga. In the 1987–88 season, still owned by Barcelona, he joined Real Oviedo of Segunda División, with whom he achieved promotion (finished fourth, but Real Madrid Castilla were ineligible) while winning the Pichichi Trophy.

Carlos subsequently returned to the Camp Nou and, despite his wish to remain with Oviedo, was sold to Atlético Madrid where he could never settle, being barred at the capital side by the likes of Baltazar and Manolo. He returned to the Asturians for the following campaign, proceeding to score 133 competitive goals for them; in seven top-flight seasons, he only netted once in single digits and had 20 in 1993–94.

Subsequently, Carlos had an abroad spell with Mexico's Club Puebla, where he continued to display his abilities. In a 12 October 1996 match against Tecos UAG, he scored four times in a 5–2 win. He retired from football altogether after a few games with another club in the country and region, Lobos BUAP, at the age of 40; he was the only player ever to be crowned top scorer in both the Liga MX and the Ascenso MX.

== International career ==
Carlos played six times for the Spain national team in six months, scoring as many goals. His first cap came on 12 September 1990 in a friendly with Brazil in Gijón, and he found the net after ten minutes in a 3–0 victory.

Following his stellar campaign with Oviedo, Carlos was overlooked by national boss Javier Clemente for his 1994 FIFA World Cup squad even though he was the best national scorer. The pair had had a run-in whilst at Atlético Madrid.

== Career statistics ==
Scores and results list Spain's goal tally first, score column indicates score after each Muñoz goal.

List of international goals scored by Carlos Muñoz
No.	Date	Venue	Opponent	Score	Result	Competition
1	12 September 1990	El Molinón, Gijón, Spain	Brazil	1–0	3–0	Friendly
2	10 October 1990	Benito Villamarín, Seville, Spain	Iceland	2–0	2–1	Euro 1992 qualifying
3	14 November 1990	Evžena Rošického, Prague, Czechoslovakia	Czechoslovakia	2–1	2–3	Euro 1992 qualifying
4	19 December 1990	Ramón Sánchez Pizjuán, Seville, Spain	Albania	2–0	9–0	Euro 1992 qualifying
5	19 December 1990	Ramón Sánchez Pizjuán, Seville, Spain	Albania	6–0	9–0	Euro 1992 qualifying
6	27 March 1991	El Sardinero, Santander, Spain	Hungary	2–3	2–4	Friendly

== Honours ==
Individual

- Pichichi Trophy (Segunda División): 1987–88
- Mexican Primera División Golden Boot: Invierno 1996
