= Ricardo Bango =

Spanish footballer and coach

Personal information
- Full name: Ricardo González Bango
- Date of birth: 18 September 1968 (age 58)
- Place of birth: Gijón, Spain
- Height: 1.83 m (6 ft 0 in)
- Position: Midfielder

Team information
- Current team: Llanes (manager)

Youth career
- Colegio Inmaculada

Senior career*
Years	Team	Apps	(Gls)
1986–1988	Oviedo B	41	(17)
1987–1992	Oviedo	133	(27)
1992–1995	Sevilla	77	(12)
1995–1998	Sporting Gijón	86	(8)
1998–2000	Oviedo	34	(3)
2001–2002	Celaya	40	(1)
Total		411	(68)

International career
1989–1990	Spain U21	4	(0)
1990–1991	Spain	2	(0)

Managerial career
- 2006–2007: Tuilla
- 2007–2008: Lealtad
- 2009–2011: Tuilla
- 2011–2012: Avilés
- 2022–2024: Tuilla
- 2024–: Llanes
- * Club domestic league appearances and goals

Ricardo González Bango (born 18 September 1968) is a Spanish former professional footballer who played as a midfielder. He is the manager of Tercera Federación club CD Llanes.
