= 1994–95 Sporting de Gijón season =

Real Sporting
1994–95 season
- Chairman: José Fernández
- Manager: Ricardo Rezza
- Stadium: El Molinón
- La Liga: 18th
- Copa del Rey: Semifinals
- Top goalscorer: Pier (11)
- Average home league attendance: 20,345

The 1994–95 Sporting de Gijón season was the 33rd season of the club in La Liga, the 19th consecutive after its last promotion.

== Overview ==
Sporting avoided the relegation by defeating UE Lleida in the double-legged relegation playoffs. In the second match, Real Sporting won 3–2 and El Molinón registered the highest attendance for a Sporting match.

Things were better in Copa del Rey, where Sporting reached the semifinals, but finally was eliminated by eventual champions Deportivo de La Coruña.

=== Managerial changes ===
Mariano García Remón started the season but was sacked after losing 4–0 against Real Madrid. Carlos García Cuervo replaced him until the round 37. Ricardo Rezza was signed for only playing the last round and the relegation playoffs. As the club passed successfully the series, Rezza continued at the helm of the club the next season.

== Squad ==
Note: Flags indicate national team as defined under FIFA eligibility rules; some limited exceptions apply. Players may hold more than one non-FIFA nationality.

No.	Pos.	Nation	Player
—	GK	ESP	Juan Carlos Ablanedo
—	GK	ESP	Juanjo
—	GK	ESP	Ramón
—	DF	ESP	David Miner
—	DF	ESP	Francisco Javier Espejo
—	DF	ESP	Marcelino
—	DF	ESP	Juan Ramón López Muñiz
—	DF	ESP	Pablo
—	DF	ESP	Raúl
—	DF	ESP	Rogelio
—	DF	ESP	Tino
—	DF	ESP	Jesús Enrique Velasco
—	MF	ESP	Avelino
—	MF	ESP	Caco Morán
—	MF	ESP	Francisco Javier Castaño
—	MF	ESP	David Cano

No.	Pos.	Nation	Player
—	MF	ESP	Emilio
—	MF	ESP	Fredi
—	MF	ARG	Hugo Pérez
—	MF	ESP	José Manuel
—	MF	RUS	Igor Lediakhov
—	MF	ESP	Miner
—	MF	ROU	Marcel Sabou
—	MF	CRO	Daniel Šarić
—	MF	ESP	Tomás
—	FW	ESP	Dani Bouzas
—	FW	ESP	Dani Díaz
—	FW	ESP	José Luis Morales
—	FW	ESP	Marcos Vales
—	FW	ESP	Pier
—	FW	ESP	Marcos Sequeiros

== Competitions ==
=== La Liga ===
==== Results by round ====
Round	1	2	3	4	5	6	7	8	9	10	11	12	13	14	15	16	17	18	19	20	21	22	23	24	25	26	27	28	29	30	31	32	33	34	35	36	37	38
Ground	H	A	H	A	H	A	H	A	A	H	A	H	A	H	A	H	A	H	A	A	H	A	H	A	H	A	H	H	A	H	A	H	A	H	A	H	A	H
Result	W	L	D	L	W	W	W	L	L	L	D	D	L	L	D	D	D	D	L	L	W	L	D	L	D	L	D	L	D	D	L	L	L	W	L	L	L	L
Position	6	9	9	14	12	9	7	8	12	13	13	12	14	17	16	17	16	16	16	19	18	19	18	18	18	18	18	18	17	16	17	18	18	17	18	18	18	18

Source: BDFutbol
A = Away; H = Home; W = Win; D = Draw; L = Loss

==== League table ====
Pos	Team	Pld	W	D	L	GF	GA	GD	Pts	Qualification or relegation
16	Compostela	38	11	12	15	44	56	−12	34 (Note: ALB 1–3 COM; COM 0–0 ALB)	
17	Albacete (Note: On July 31, 1995, Sevilla and Celta Vigo were relegated to Segunda División B for not providing documentation (an audit) nor making their payments to the Royal Spanish Football Federation within the time limit. The two best qualified teams to be relegated, Albacete and Valladolid were readmitted to La Liga. Later, Sevilla and Celta Vigo claimed that according to the law they had another 15 working days because they made allegations days before. Finally, the solution was to not relegate any involved team and expand the league to 22 teams for the next two seasons.)	38	10	14	14	44	61	−17	34	Qualification for the relegation playoffs
18	Sporting Gijón (O)	38	8	12	18	42	67	−25	28	Qualification for the relegation playoffs
19	Valladolid	38	8	9	21	25	63	−38	25	
20	Logroñés (R)	38	2	9	27	15	79	−64	13	Relegation to the Segunda División

Source: LFP
Rules for classification: 1) points; 2) head-to-head points; 3) head-to-head goal difference; 4) head-to-head goals scored; 5) goal difference; 6) number of goals scored.
(O) Play-off winners; (R) Relegated

==== Matches ====
4 September 1994 1	Real Sporting	2–1	Barcelona	Gijón
	Pier 15'; Lediakhov 42'	Summary	Koeman 31'; Guardiola (yellow card) (yellow-red card) 84'	Stadium: El Molinón; Referee: Fernández Marín

10 September 1994 2	Deportivo La Coruña	2–1	Real Sporting	A Coruña
	José Ramón 15'; Donato 20'	Summary	David Miner 53'	Stadium: Riazor; Referee: Martín Navarrete

18 September 1994 3	Real Sporting	0–0	Celta	Gijón
		Summary		Stadium: El Molinón; Referee: Contador Crespo

23 September 1994 4	Betis	5–0	Real Sporting	Seville
	Aquino 17'; Cuéllar 59', 63', 88'; Kowalczyk 81'	Summary		Stadium: Benito Villamarín; Referee: García Aranda

2 October 1994 5	Real Sporting	1–0	Real Madrid	Gijón
	Velasco 86'	Report		Stadium: El Molinón; Referee: Ansuategui Roca

9 October 1994 6	Logroñés	1–3	Real Sporting	Logroño
	Marković 41' (pen.)	Summary	Muñiz 44' (pen.); Caco Morán 52'; Tomás 86'	Stadium: Las Gaunas; Referee: López Nieto

16 October 1994 7	Real Sporting	3–2	Albacete	Gijón
	Caco Morán 18'; Tomás 44'; Marcos Vales 54'	Summary	Andonov 80'; Cordero 88'	Stadium: El Molinón; Referee: Brito Arceo

23 October 1994 8	Athletic Bilbao	2–0	Real Sporting	Bilbao
	Mendiguren 9'; Garitano 61'	Summary		Stadium: San Mamés; Referee: Fernández Marín

30 October 1994 9	Sevilla	5–1	Real Sporting	Seville
	Pineda 41'; Šuker 44'; Pablo 65' (o.g.); Moya 70'; Rafa Paz 82'	Report	Caco Morán 79'	Stadium: Ramón Sánchez Pizjuán; Referee: Ansuategui Roca

6 November 1994 10	Real Sporting	2–3	Racing Santander	Gijón
	Pablo 63'; Caco Morán 73'	Report	Quique Setién 33' (pen.); Popov 35'; Radchenko 61'; Torrecilla (red card) 73'	Stadium: El Molinón; Referee: Gómez López

20 November 1994 11	Español	1–1	Real Sporting	Barcelona
	Pochettino (red card) 32'; Roberto 51'	Report	Pier 68'	Stadium: Sarrià; Referee: Núñez Manrique

27 November 1994 12	Real Sporting	1–1	Compostela	Gijón
	Muñiz 53' (pen.)	Summary	Pichi Lucas 63'	Stadium: El Molinón; Referee: Daudén Ibáñez

4 December 1994 13	Zaragoza	3–2	Real Sporting	Zaragoza
	Pardeza 47', 51'; Aragón 56' (pen.)	Report	Pier 10'; Marcos Vales 61'	Stadium: La Romareda; Referee: Barrenechea Montero

11 December 1994 14	Real Sporting	0–2	Atlético Madrid	Gijón
		Report	Caminero 8'; Simeone 56'	Stadium: El Molinón; Referee: Andradas Asurmendi

21 December 1994 15	Valencia	0–0	Real Sporting	Valencia
		Summary		Stadium: Mestalla; Referee: Rubio Valdivieso

8 January 1995 16	Real Sporting	1–1	Tenerife	Gijón
	Pier 79'	Summary	Pizzi 89'	Stadium: El Molinón; Referee: Panadero Martínez

15 January 1995 17	Real Sociedad	2–2	Real Sporting	San Sebastián
	Luis Pérez 9'; Kodro 76'	Summary	Morales 47', 67'	Stadium: Anoeta; Referee: Rodríguez Martel

22 January 1995 18	Real Sporting	1–1	Oviedo	Gijón
	Pier 38'	Report	Carlos 72'	Stadium: El Molinón; Referee: Gracia Redondo

29 January 1995 19	Valladolid	2–0	Real Sporting	Valladolid
	Nílson 84'; Urban 89'	Report		Stadium: José Zorrilla; Referee: Contador Crespo

5 February 1995 20	Barcelona	3–1	Real Sporting	Barcelona
	Hagi 18'; Escaich 73'; Iván Iglesias 85'	Summary	Morales 9'	Stadium: Camp Nou; Referee: Pajares Paz

12 February 1995 21	Real Sporting	3–1	Deportivo La Coruña	Gijón
	Pier 19'; Morales 59', 66'	Summary	Donato 32'	Stadium: El Molinón; Referee: Andújar Oliver

19 February 1995 22	Celta	2–0	Real Sporting	Vigo
	Gudelj 64', 66'	Summary		Stadium: Balaídos; Referee: Martín Navarrete

25 February 1995 23	Real Sporting	1–1	Real Betis	Gijón
	Pier 53'	Summary	Menéndez 43'	Stadium: El Molinón; Referee: Esquinas Torres

5 March 1995 24	Real Madrid	4–0	Real Sporting	Madrid
	Hierro 33'; Amavisca 36'; Redondo 44'; Laudrup 61'	Summary		Stadium: Santiago Bernabéu; Referee: Panadero Martínez

12 March 1995 25	Real Sporting	2–2	Logroñés	Gijón
	Pier 23'; Pablo 84'	Summary	Gudelj 4'; Javi Delgado 16'	Stadium: El Molinón; Referee: Fernández Marín

19 March 1995 26	Albacete	1–2	Real Sporting	Albacete
	Bjelica 16'	Summary	Velasco 42'; Sabou 76'	Stadium: Carlos Belmonte; Referee: López Nieto

2 April 1995 27	Real Sporting	1–1	Athletic Bilbao	Gijón
	Tomás 30'	Summary	Valverde 64'	Stadium: El Molinón; Referee: Santamaría Uzqueda

9 April 1995 28	Real Sporting	3–0	Sevilla	Gijón
	Pier 48'; Hugo Pérez 74'; Šarić 87'	Summary	Tevenet (yellow card) (yellow-red card) 66'; Jiménez (yellow card) (yellow-red card) 72'	Stadium: El Molinón; Referee: Núñez Manrique

16 April 1995 29	Racing Santander	0–0	Real Sporting	Santander
		Summary		Stadium: El Sardinero; Referee: Andújar Oliver

23 April 1995 30	Real Sporting	0–0	Espanyol	Gijón
		Summary	Mendiondo (yellow card) (yellow-red card) 84'	Stadium: El Molinón; Referee: López Nieto

30 April 1995 31	Compostela	3–2	Real Sporting	Santiago de Compostela
	Ohen 3'; Bellido 34'; Moure 86'	Summary	Lediakhov (red card) 31'; Sabou 58'; Pablo 59'	Stadium: San Lázaro; Referee: Brito Arceo

6 May 1995 32	Real Sporting	1–3	Zaragoza	Gijón
	Pier 1'	Summary	Poyet 4'; Pardez 13'; Esnáider 89'	Stadium: El Molinón; Referee: Andradas Asurmendi

14 May 1995 33	Atlético Madrid	3–2	Real Sporting	Madrid
	Kosecki 11'; Kiko 62'; Dobrovolski 83'	Summary	Pier 58'; Morales 65'; Hugo Pérez (yellow card) (yellow-red card) 86'	Stadium: Santiago Bernabéu; Referee: Ansuategui Roca

21 May 1995 34	Real Sporting	1–0	Valencia	Gijón
	Sabou 23'	Summary		Stadium: El Molinón; Referee: Santamaría Uzqueda

27 May 1995 35	Tenerife	3–0	Real Sporting	Santa Cruz de Tenerife
	Pizzi 1'; Ezequiel Castillo 22', 51'	Summary		Stadium: Heliodoro Rodríguez López; Referee: Marín López

4 June 1995 36	Real Sporting	1–2	Real Sociedad	Gijón
	Lediakhov 31'	Summary	Etxeberria 54', 65'	Stadium: El Molinón; Referee: Pajares Paz

11 June 1995 37	Oviedo	1–0	Real Sporting	Oviedo
	Oli 57'; Prosinečki (red card) 67'	Summary	Avelino (yellow card) (yellow-red card) 69'	Stadium: Carlos Tartiere; Referee: López Nieto

17 June 1995 38	Real Sporting	1–3	Valladolid	Gijón
	Sequeiros 44'	Summary	Espejo 11' (o.g.); Alberto 74', 78'	Stadium: El Molinón; Referee: Gómez López

=== Relegation playoffs ===
22 June 1995	Lleida	2–2	Real Sporting	Lleida
21:30	Salillas 20'; Roa 90'	Report (in Spanish)	Sabou 34'; Pier 51'	Stadium: Camp d'Esports; Attendance: 10,000; Referee: Fernández Marín

28 June 1995	Real Sporting	3–2 (5–4 agg.)	Lleida	Gijón
21:30	Lediakhov 51'; Sabou 65'; Pier 77'	Report (in Spanish)	David 56'; Salillas 85'	Stadium: El Molinón; Attendance: 42,000; Referee: López Nieto

=== Copa del Rey ===
==== Matches ====
4 January 1995 Third round First leg	Eibar	0–1	Real Sporting	Eibar
		Report	Pier 89'	Stadium: Ipurua; Referee: Pajares Paz

11 January 1995 Third round Second leg	Real Sporting	3–2 (4–2 agg.)	Eibar	Gijón
	Muñiz 15'; Marcos Vales 62'; Lediakhov 84'	Report	Loinaz 11'; Jandro 65'	Stadium: El Molinón; Referee: Santamaría Uzqueda

25 January 1995 Fourth round First leg	Sevilla	2–1	Real Sporting	Seville
	Šuker 52', 90'	Report	Lediakhov 70'	Stadium: Ramón Sánchez Pizjuán; Referee: Brito Arceo

1 February 1995 Fourth round Second leg	Real Sporting	3–1 (4–3 agg.)	Sevilla	Gijón
	Morales 7'; Lediakhov 18'; Pablo 89'	Report	Šuker 81'; Bango (yellow card) (yellow-red card) 87'	Stadium: El Molinón; Referee: Marín López

8 February 1995 Round of 16; First leg	Real Sporting	1–1	Badajoz	Gijón
	Raúl 27'	Report	Altimira 28'	Stadium: El Molinón; Referee: Andradas Asurmendi

15 February 1995 Round of 16; Second leg	Badajoz	0–3 (1–4 agg.)	Real Sporting	Badajoz
		Report	Pier 71', 91'; Lediakhov 80'	Stadium: El Vivero; Referee: Fernández Marín

8 March 1995 Quarterfinals; First leg	Real Sporting	1–1	Rayo Vallecano	Gijón
	Morales 2'	Report	Gustavo 32'	Stadium: El Molinón; Referee: Rubio Valdivieso

22 March 1995 Quarterfinals; Second leg	Rayo Vallecano	0–1 (1–2 agg.)	Real Sporting	Madrid
		Report	Raúl 66'	Stadium: Vallecas; Referee: Ansuategui Roca

30 May 1995 Semifinals; First leg	Real Sporting	0–2	Deportivo La Coruña	Gijón
		Report	Manjarín 20'; Julio Salinas 54'	Stadium: El Molinón; Referee: Fernández Marín

14 June 1995 Semifinals; Second leg	Deportivo La Coruña	0–1 (2–1 agg.)	Real Sporting	A Coruña
		Report	Lediakhov 10'	Stadium: Riazor; Referee: Gracia Redondo

== Squad statistics ==
=== Appearances and goals ===
No.	Pos	Nat	Player	Total		La Liga		Playoffs		Copa del Rey	
No.	Pos	Nat	Player	Apps	Goals	Apps	Goals	Apps	Goals	Apps	Goals
	GK	(Spain) ESP	Juan Carlos Ablanedo	34	0	34+0	0	0+0	0	0+0	0
	GK	(Spain) ESP	Ramón	16	0	3+1	0	2+0	0	10+0	0
	GK	(Spain) ESP	Juanjo	1	0	1+0	0	0+0	0	0+0	0
	DF	(Spain) ESP	Jesús Enrique Velasco	43	2	33+1	2	0+1	0	7+1	0
	DF	(Spain) ESP	Tino	6	0	2+2	0	2+0	0	0+0	0
	DF	(Spain) ESP	David Miner	36	1	25+5	1	0+0	0	6+0	0
	DF	(Spain) ESP	Juan Ramón López Muñiz	47	3	35+0	2	2+0	0	10+0	1
	DF	(Spain) ESP	Francisco Javier Espejo	5	0	2+0	0	0+0	0	1+2	0
	DF	(Spain) ESP	Pablo	46	4	32+2	3	2+0	0	9+1	1
	DF	(Spain) ESP	Marcelino Elena	10	0	6+2	0	1+0	0	1+0	0
	DF	(Spain) ESP	Raúl	27	2	19+0	0	1+1	0	6+0	2
	DF	(Spain) ESP	Rogelio	13	0	12+0	0	0+0	0	1+0	0
	MF	(Spain) ESP	Caco Morán	14	4	9+3	4	0+0	0	0+2	0
	MF	(Spain) ESP	Miner	13	0	5+8	0	0+0	0	0+0	0
	MF	(Spain) ESP	Avelino	18	0	7+3	0	2+0	0	5+1	0
	MF	(Spain) ESP	Fredi	3	0	0+3	0	0+0	0	0+0	0
	FW	(Spain) ESP	Marcos Vales	17	3	11+3	2	0+0	0	2+1	1
	MF	(Argentina) ARG	Hugo Pérez	25	1	17+0	1	2+0	0	6+0	0
	MF	(Croatia) CRO	Daniel Šarić	15	1	5+6	1	0+0	0	3+1	0
	MF	(Spain) ESP	Emilio	12	0	6+3	0	0+0	0	1+2	0
	MF	(Spain) ESP	José Manuel	7	0	3+3	0	0+0	0	1+0	0
	MF	(Spain) ESP	David Cano	5	0	1+2	0	0+1	0	0+1	0
	MF	(Romania) ROU	Marcel Sabou	34	5	19+7	3	2+0	2	5+1	0
	MF	(Spain) ESP	Tomás	27	3	20+2	3	0+0	0	5+0	0
	MF	(Russia) RUS	Igor Lediakhov	35	8	23+0	2	2+0	1	10+0	5
	MF	(Spain) ESP	Francisco Javier Castaño	30	0	23+1	0	0+1	0	4+1	0
	MF	(Spain) ESP	Dani Díaz	1	0	1+0	0	0+0	0	0+0	0
	FW	(Spain) ESP	Pier	45	16	33+2	11	2+0	2	7+1	3
	FW	(Spain) ESP	José Luis Morales	40	8	18+14	6	0+0	0	7+1	2
	FW	(Spain) ESP	Marcos Sequeiros	3	1	2+1	1	0+0	0	0+0	0
	FW	(Spain) ESP	Dani Bouzas	21	0	11+2	0	2+0	0	3+3	0
