= Manolo Salvador =

Spanish sporting director and former footballer

Personal information
- Full name: Manuel Salvador Serra
- Date of birth: 27 November 1963 (age 62)
- Place of birth: Faura, Spain
- Height: 1.75 m (5 ft 9 in)
- Positions: Midfielder; forward

Senior career*
| Years | Team | Apps | (Gls) |
| 1988–1989 | Villarreal | 34 | (6) |
| 1989–1993 | Albacete Balompié | 98 | (12) |
| 1993–1995 | Atlético Marbella | 48 | (2) |
| 1995–1997 | Albacete Balompié | 87 | (2) |
| 1997–1998 | Levante | 8 | (0) |
| Total | | 275 | (22) |
- * Club domestic league appearances and goals

Manuel "Manolo" Salvador Serra (born 27 November 1963) is a Spanish retired footballer who played as a midfielder or a forward. He spent the majority of his career with Albacete Balompié, with whom he made 89 La Liga appearances during two separate spells.

== Career ==
=== Villarreal ===
Manolo came to professional football relatively late, joining Villarreal in 1988 at the age of 24. He made his debut for the club, then in Segunda División B, in the first match of the 1988–89 season on 4 September. Villarreal, playing away from home, got off to a good start with a 1–0 win over Cartagena FC at Estadio Cartagonova, a scoreline they repeated a week later for Manolo's home debut, against Atlético Marbella at Estadio El Madrigal. He scored his first goal for the club in a 4–1 home win over Granada on 4 December, and finished the season with six goals in 34 appearances. On 18 June, he scored a brace in the 3–2 home win over Linense, but this turned out to be his last match for Villarreal.

=== Albacete Balompié ===
In the summer of 1989, Manolo joined Villarreal's Segunda División B rivals Albacete Balompié. This proved to be an inspired move, with Albacete about to embark on an unprecedented period of success, and Manolo would play a major part. His Albacete debut came in the first match of the season, a 1–0 away win over Mérida at Estadio Romano on 3 September, and another victory followed as they beat Telde 2–0 at Estadio Carlos Belmonte on his home debut a week later. In the fifth match of the season, he helped Albacete maintain their 100% record with his first goal for the club, which came in another 2–0 win over Sevilla Atlético. He scored six times in 33 appearances that year, including a brace in the 4–0 win over Linares on 26 November.

It was an excellent season for Albacete, who won their group and earned promotion to the Segunda División. This meant that 1990–91 gave Manolo the opportunity to make his Segunda División debut, which he duly did on 2 September as Albacete got off to a winning start by taking a 2–0 home victory against Palamós. His first goal at that level came on 18 November during a 5–1 home win over Figueres, and he finished the season with his habitual six goals in 32 matches.

Miraculously, Albacete won the Segunda División title at the first attempt, and earned a second successive promotion, reaching La Liga for the first time in their history. Manolo featured less heavily as Albacete strengthened the squad for their inaugural top flight season, and he had to wait until 26 January to make his La Liga debut. This came in a home fixture against Atlético Madrid, where he came off the bench with eight minutes to play in place of Delfí Geli, who had joined on loan from Barcelona in the summer. Albacete held on for a remarkable 3–1 victory.

His first start in the top flight came on 9 February in a 1–1 draw with Valencia at Estadio Luis Casanova, while his first home start didn't arrive until 28 March, in a 3–1 loss to Real Madrid. In total, he played 15 times that season. 1992–93 was better for Manolo, with 27 appearances, but worse for Albacete: they ended the league in 17th place, and had to play a relegation playoff against Real Mallorca. Manolo played for just two minutes of the first leg, but Albacete narrowly prevailed and maintained their top flight place.

=== Atlético Marbella ===
The majority of Manolo's appearances in Albacete's two La Liga campaigns had been as a substitute, and in search of more regular starting opportunities he dropped down a division in 1993, joining Atlético Marbella in the Segunda División. He was an immediate fixture in the Marbella starting line-up, and made his debut in the first match of the season, away to Real Murcia at Estadio de La Condomina on 5 September. The match ended 1–1, as did his home debut against Castellón a week later. He scored his first Marbella goal on 20 November in a 2–2 home draw with Compostela, and finished the season with 35 appearances and two goals.

He continued to play an important part in the team in 1994–95, appearing in 15 of the first 17 league games. The 2–0 home loss to Rayo Vallecano on 15 January would prove to be his last for Marbella, though, as he rejoined Albacete in the January transfer window.

=== Return to Albacete ===
His second Albacete debut came on 22 January, in a 2–2 home draw with Barcelona. His stint with Marbella had built up his reputation, and he was now a regular starter for Albacete, featuring 25 times before the end of the season. These included playing both legs of the relegation playoff that they found themselves involved in once again. Deep into stoppage time in the second leg against Salamanca, played at home for Albacete, they held a 2–1 aggregate lead, despite being one down on the night through Miguel Torrecilla's first half goal. In the 94th minute, Manolo was sent off, and one minute later former Albacete player Ismael Urzaiz scored to level the scores and send the tie to extra time. With only ten men, the floodgates opened during the added period, and Urzaiz scored again, before Antonio Díaz and Martín Vellisca made it 5–0 at the final whistle. This was the only red card of Manolo's career.

This dramatic finish should have meant relegation for Albacete, but an administration scandal involving Sevilla and Celta Vigo saw them handed a reprieve. Manolo made the most of it, making 40 appearances during the 1995–96 La Liga campaign, but Albacete found themselves in a relegation playoff once again. This time the opponents were Extremadura, and again Manolo played in both legs, but a pair of 1–0 losses saw them finally relegated back to the Segunda División.

Back in the second tier, Manolo played 34 matches the following season, and scored his first Albacete goal for more than five years in a 2–0 home win over Ourense on 14 September. A 1–0 home win over Almería on 1 June was his last for Albacete, as he left the club at the end of the season after 206 appearances and 14 goals over six and a half seasons in two spells.

=== Levante ===
Manolo joined Albacete's Segunda División rivals Levante ahead of the 1997–98 season. He made his debut in the first match of the season, a 1–0 loss home loss to Toledo at Nou Estadi del Llevant on 30 August, but featured only nine times that season. On 23 November, four days shy of his 34th birthday, he played his last match as a professional in a 1–0 home defeat by Leganés, before retiring at the end of the season.

== Honours ==
=== Albacete Balompié ===
- Segunda División B: 1989–90
- Segunda División: 1990–91

== Career statistics ==
As of 18 January 2021

| Club | Season | League | | | Cup | | Other | | Total | |
| Club | Season | Division | Apps | Goals | Apps | Goals | Apps | Goals | Apps | Goals |
|---|---|---|---|---|---|---|---|---|---|---|
| Villarreal | 1988–89 | Segunda División B | 34 | 6 | 2 | 0 | – | – | 36 | 6 |
| Albacete Balompié | 1989–90 | Segunda División B | 33 | 6 | – | – | – | – | 33 | 6 |
| Albacete Balompié | 1990–91 | Segunda División | 31 | 6 | 1 | 0 | – | – | 32 | 6 |
| Albacete Balompié | 1991–92 | La Liga | 15 | 0 | 0 | 0 | – | – | 15 | 0 |
| Albacete Balompié | 1992–93 | La Liga | 19 | 0 | 7 | 0 | 1 | 0 | 27 | 0 |
| Albacete Balompié | Total | | 98 | 12 | 8 | 0 | 1 | 0 | 107 | 12 |
| Atlético Marbella | 1993–94 | Segunda División | 33 | 2 | 2 | 0 | – | – | 35 | 2 |
| Atlético Marbella | 1994–95 | Segunda División | 15 | 0 | 2 | 0 | – | – | 17 | 0 |
| Atlético Marbella | Total | | 48 | 2 | 4 | 0 | 0 | 0 | 52 | 2 |
| Albacete Balompié | 1994–95 | La Liga | 18 | 0 | 5 | 0 | 2 | 0 | 25 | 0 |
| Albacete Balompié | 1995–96 | La Liga | 37 | 0 | 1 | 0 | 2 | 0 | 40 | 0 |
| Albacete Balompié | 1996–97 | Segunda División | 32 | 2 | 2 | 0 | – | – | 34 | 2 |
| Albacete Balompié | Total | | 87 | 2 | 8 | 0 | 4 | 0 | 99 | 2 |
| Albacete Balompié total | | | 185 | 14 | 16 | 0 | 5 | 0 | 206 | 14 |
| Levante | 1997–98 | Segunda División | 8 | 0 | 1 | 0 | – | – | 9 | 0 |
| Career total | | | 275 | 22 | 23 | 0 | 5 | 0 | 303 | 22 |

1. Appearance in the 1992–93 La Liga relegation playoff
2. Appearances in the 1994–95 La Liga relegation playoff
3. Appearances in the 1995–96 La Liga relegation playoff
