= 1994–95 Segunda División =

64th season of the second-tier football league in Spain

Segunda División
- Season: 1994–95
- Champions: CP Mérida
- Promoted: CP Mérida; Rayo Vallecano; UD Salamanca
- Relegated: Palamós CF; CD Orense
- Matches: 380
- Goals: 875 (2.3 per match)
- Top goalscorer: (Spain) Antonio Puche

The 1994–95 Segunda División season saw 20 teams participate in the second flight Spanish league. CP Mérida won the league.

CP Mérida, Rayo Vallecano and UD Salamanca were promoted to Primera División. Palamós CF and CD Orense were relegated to Segunda División B.

== Teams ==
Location of teams in Segunda División 1994-95

Team	Home city	Stadium
Athletic Bilbao B	Bilbao	San Mamés
Badajoz	Badajoz	El Vivero
Barcelona B	Barcelona	Mini Estadi
Eibar	Eibar	Ipurua
Extremadura	Almendralejo	Francisco de la Hera
Getafe	Getafe	Las Margaritas
Hércules	Alicante	José Rico Pérez
Leganés	Leganés	Luis Rodríguez de Miguel
Lleida	Lleida	Camp d'Esports
Mallorca	Mallorca	Lluís Sitjar
Atlético Marbella	Marbella	Municipal de Marbella
Mérida	Mérida	Municipal de Mérida
Ourense	Ourense	O Couto
Osasuna	Pamplona	El Sadar
Palamós	Palamós	Nou Municipal
Rayo Vallecano	Madrid	Vallecas
Real Madrid B	Madrid	Ciudad Deportiva
Salamanca	Villares de la Reina	Helmántico
Toledo	Toledo	Salto del Caballo
Villarreal	Villarreal	El Madrigal

=== Teams by Autonomous Community ===
	Autonomous community	Number of teams	Teams
1	Madrid	4	Getafe, Leganés, Real Madrid B, Rayo Vallecano
2	Catalonia	3	Barcelona B, Lleida, Palamós
2	Extremadura	3	Badajoz, Extremadura, Mérida
4	(Basque Country (autonomous community)) Basque Country	2	Athletic Bilbao B, Eibar
4	Valencia	2	Hércules, Villarreal
6	Andalusia	1	Marbella
6	Balearic Islands	1	Mallorca
6	Castile and León	1	Salamanca
6	Castile-La Mancha	1	Toledo
6	Galicia	1	Ourense
6	Navarre	1	Osasuna

== Final table ==
Pos	Team	Pld	W	D	L	GF	GA	GD	Pts	Promotion or relegation
1	CP Mérida	38	23	10	5	55	19	+36	56	Promoted to Primera División
2	Rayo Vallecano	38	20	13	5	61	31	+30	53	Promoted to Primera División
3	UE Lleida	38	19	8	11	54	34	+20	46	Promotion playoff
4	UD Salamanca	38	15	15	8	48	37	+11	45	Promotion playoff
5	SD Eibar	38	12	19	7	32	27	+5	43	
6	Barcelona B	38	11	20	7	64	48	+16	42	
7	CA Osasuna	38	14	13	11	39	35	+4	41	
8	Real Madrid B	38	13	13	12	42	40	+2	39	
9	Hércules CF	38	13	13	12	43	44	−1	39	
10	Villarreal CF	38	11	16	11	41	36	+5	38	
11	CD Toledo	38	13	12	13	49	54	−5	38	
12	RCD Mallorca	38	13	12	13	53	40	+13	38	
13	Atlético Marbella	38	13	8	17	42	54	−12	34	
14	CD Badajoz	38	9	16	13	32	40	−8	34	
15	CF Extremadura	38	8	18	12	35	48	−13	34	
16	Athletic de Bilbao B	38	10	12	16	42	52	−10	32	
17	Palamós CF (Note: Palamós CF was relegated to Tercera División for not paying its players.)	38	8	14	16	52	57	−5	30	Relegated to Segunda División B
18	Getafe CF (Note: On July 31, 1995, Sevilla FC and Celta de Vigo were relegated to Segunda División B for not making their payments to the Royal Spanish Football Federation. Then, Albacete Bp. and Real Valladolid were readmitted to Primera División and Getafe CF and CD Leganés were readmitted to Segunda División. Later, Sevilla FC and Celta de Vigo were also readmitted to Primera División, expanding the league to 22 teams.)	38	5	20	13	26	42	−16	30	Relegated to Segunda División B
19	CD Leganés	38	10	8	20	39	66	−27	28	Relegated to Segunda División B
20	CD Ourense	38	4	12	22	26	71	−45	20	Relegated to Segunda División B

Source: arquero-arba.futbolme.net and lafutbolteca.com

== Results ==
Home \ Away	ATH	BAD	BAR	EIB	EXT	GET	HÉR	LEG	LLE	MLL	MAR	MÉR	OSA	OUR	PAL	RAY	RMC	SAL	TOL	VIL
Athletic B	—	2–1	0–0	1–2	1–1	1–0	0–1	3–1	0–2	4–3	3–1	0–1	3–1	3–0	3–1	1–2	1–3	0–0	1–1	0–2
Badajoz	2–1	—	0–0	0–0	1–1	2–0	0–0	1–1	0–1	1–0	1–4	0–0	0–1	1–0	2–3	2–2	0–2	1–1	0–0	2–1
Barcelona B	3–3	0–0	—	0–0	5–1	1–1	0–0	6–2	3–2	2–2	5–2	1–0	1–1	7–0	3–1	1–1	4–1	2–0	3–3	1–1
Eibar	0–0	0–0	1–0	—	0–0	1–1	2–0	0–0	3–1	1–0	0–0	0–1	1–1	1–0	1–1	0–1	0–0	0–0	2–2	2–1
Extremadura	2–1	0–1	1–1	0–0	—	0–0	2–0	0–0	0–2	2–0	1–0	1–4	1–0	0–0	1–2	0–0	1–1	2–3	1–1	0–0
Getafe	1–1	0–0	1–1	0–1	2–2	—	0–0	1–0	2–2	2–2	1–1	0–0	0–2	1–0	0–3	1–1	0–3	0–0	1–3	1–1
Hércules	1–0	2–1	2–0	0–1	2–3	1–0	—	1–1	1–0	2–0	3–1	1–1	1–0	5–0	1–1	3–1	1–2	1–0	1–2	1–1
Leganés	1–0	0–1	1–2	2–0	1–2	2–1	2–3	—	1–1	1–3	2–0	1–0	1–1	4–2	1–0	1–2	1–0	0–2	2–3	0–2
Lleida	0–0	1–0	4–2	2–1	5–1	0–0	4–0	3–0	—	1–0	1–3	0–1	1–2	3–0	2–1	1–1	2–0	1–1	2–0	0–1
Mallorca	6–2	1–0	1–1	0–0	1–0	1–1	1–0	2–0	0–0	—	3–1	1–0	5–0	2–0	5–2	2–0	2–0	1–2	1–1	2–2
Marbella	2–1	0–0	2–0	0–1	2–1	0–2	0–0	0–1	2–0	2–1	—	0–2	1–0	1–0	2–2	0–2	0–2	3–1	2–0	3–2
Mérida	2–0	1–0	2–1	1–1	1–1	2–0	4–0	1–1	3–2	0–0	3–0	—	1–1	1–0	1–1	1–0	1–1	4–0	1–0	2–0
Osasuna	1–1	1–1	1–1	2–2	1–0	2–0	2–1	3–0	0–1	1–0	3–0	0–1	—	1–1	2–0	0–0	1–0	1–2	2–2	2–1
Ourense	0–1	1–1	1–1	2–1	3–2	0–2	1–1	0–2	1–2	2–2	1–0	0–3	0–0	—	1–4	0–4	0–0	2–2	1–1	1–1
Palamós	1–1	3–4	3–3	1–1	1–1	2–0	1–1	7–1	0–0	1–1	0–1	1–2	0–1	2–0	—	2–3	2–1	0–0	1–1	0–2
Rayo Vallecano	1–2	1–0	0–0	2–2	3–0	1–1	3–1	3–1	1–0	1–0	2–2	2–0	2–0	1–1	3–1	—	4–0	2–1	2–0	3–0
R. Madrid B	0–0	2–0	1–2	2–0	1–1	1–0	2–2	4–1	0–2	1–0	2–2	0–2	0–0	0–1	2–0	1–3	—	0–0	2–1	1–1
Salamanca	3–0	5–1	2–0	1–0	1–1	1–2	1–1	0–0	0–2	0–0	0–0	2–1	1–0	3–1	2–1	1–1	2–4	—	4–0	2–1
Toledo	3–1	0–3	1–1	2–3	0–1	1–1	3–1	3–2	0–1	3–2	2–1	0–2	2–0	3–2	1–0	2–0	0–0	1–2	—	1–0
Villarreal	0–0	2–2	3–0	0–1	1–1	0–0	1–1	3–1	3–0	1–0	3–1	0–2	0–2	2–1	0–0	0–0	0–0	0–0	2–0	—

Source: BDFutbol
Legend: Blue = home team win; Yellow = draw; Red = away team win.

== Promotion play-offs ==
Team 1	Agg.	Team 2	1st leg	2nd leg
UD Salamanca	5–2	Albacete Balompié	0–2	5–0 (aet)
UE Lleida	4–5	Sporting Gijón	2–2	2–3

=== First leg ===
21 June 1995	UD Salamanca	0–2	Albacete Balompié	Villares de la Reina
21:30		Report (in Spanish)	Bjelica 17'; Zalazar 62'	Stadium: Helmántico; Attendance: 17,000; Referee: José María García-Aranda (Community of Madrid)

22 June 1995	UE Lleida	2–2	Sporting Gijón	Lleida
21:30	Salillas 20'; Roa 90'	Report (in Spanish)	Sabou 34'; Pier 51'	Stadium: Camp d'Esports; Attendance: 10,000; Referee: Juan Fernández Marín (Community of Madrid)

=== Second leg ===
27 June 1995	Albacete Balompié	0–5 (a.e.t.) (2–5 agg.)	UD Salamanca	Albacete
21:30		Report (in Spanish)	Torrecilla 40'; Urzaiz 90', 110'; Antonio Díaz 115'; Vellisca 120'	Stadium: Carlos Belmonte; Attendance: 17,000; Referee: Juan Manuel Brito Arceo (Canary Islands)

28 June 1995	Sporting Gijón	3–2 (5–4 agg.)	UE Lleida	Gijón
21:30	Lediakhov 51'; Sabou 65'; Pier 77'	Report (in Spanish)	David 56'; Salillas 85'	Stadium: El Molinón; Attendance: 42,000; Referee: Antonio Jesús López Nieto (Andalusia)
