= 1999–2000 Real Zaragoza season =

Real Zaragoza
1999–2000 season
- President: Alfonso Soláns
- Head coach: Chechu Rojo
- Stadium: La Romareda
- La Liga: 4th
- Copa del Rey: Round of 16
- Top goalscorer: League: Savo Milošević (21); All: Savo Milošević (22)
Home colours	Away colours	Third colours

The 1999–2000 season was the 68th in the history of Real Zaragoza and their 22nd consecutive season in the second division. The club participated in the La Liga and the Copa del Rey.

== Players ==
Note: Flags indicate national team as defined under FIFA eligibility rules; some limited exceptions apply. Players may hold more than one non-FIFA nationality.

No.	Pos.	Nation	Player
1	GK	ESP	Juanmi
2	MF	RUS	Vladislav Radimov
3	DF	ESP	Jesús Solana
4	DF	ESP	Luis Carlos Cuartero
5	DF	ITA	Marco Lanna
6	DF	ESP	Xavier Aguado
7	FW	ESP	Juanele
8	MF	ESP	Santiago Aragon
9	FW	YUG	Savo Milošević
10	MF	ESP	Ander Garitano
11	MF	ESP	Martin Vellisca
12	FW	BRA	Paulo Jamelli

No.	Pos.	Nation	Player
13	GK	ESP	Cesar Lainez
14	MF	ESP	José Ignacio
15	MF	ESP	Juanjo Camacho
16	DF	ARG	Pablo Díaz
17	MF	ESP	Luis Helguera
19	FW	ESP	Yordi
20	MF	PAR	Roberto Acuña
21	DF	ARG	Jorge Martínez
22	DF	SWE	Gary Sundgren
23	DF	ESP	Paco Jemez
24	MF	ESP	Marcos Vales

=== Transfers ===
In
Pos.	Name	from	Type
FW	Juanele	CD Tenerife	
MF	Martin Vellisca	UD Salamanca	
DF	Marco Lanna	UD Salamanca	
DF	Jorge Martínez	CA River Plate	

Out
Pos.	Name	To	Type
MF	Kily González	Valencia CF	
MF	Gustavo Lopez	Celta de Vigo	
DF	Gilmar	Rayo Vallecano	
GK	Faryd Mondragon	CA Independiente	
MF	Nordin Wooter	Watford FC	
FW	Javi Peña	Lleida Esportiu	

== Competitions ==
=== Overall record ===
Competition	First match	Last match	Starting round	Final position	Record							
Competition	First match	Last match	Starting round	Final position	Pld	W	D	L	GF	GA	GD	Win %
La Liga	22 August 1999	19 May 2000	Matchday 1	4th	38	16	15	7	60	40	+20	42.11
Copa del Rey	10 November 1999	3 February 2000	First round	Round of 16	6	3	2	1	10	3	+7	50.00
Total					44	19	17	8	70	43	+27	43.18

Source: Competitions

=== La Liga ===
==== League table ====
Pos	Team	Pld	W	D	L	GF	GA	GD	Pts	Qualification or relegation
2	Barcelona	38	19	7	12	70	46	+24	64 (Note: VAL 3–1 BAR; BAR 3–0 VAL)	Qualification for the Champions League group stage
3	Valencia	38	18	10	10	59	39	+20	64	Qualification for the Champions League third qualifying round
4	Zaragoza	38	16	15	7	60	40	+20	63	Qualification for the UEFA Cup first round (Note: Real Madrid qualified directly for the 2000–01 UEFA Champions League as holders. As a result, Zaragoza lost their spot in the UEFA Champions League and had to participate in the UEFA Cup.)
5	Real Madrid	38	16	14	8	58	48	+10	62	Qualification for the Champions League group stage
6	Alavés	38	17	10	11	41	37	+4	61	Qualification for the UEFA Cup first round

Source: LFP
Rules for classification: 1) points; 2) head-to-head points; 3) head-to-head goal difference; 4) head-to-head goals scored; 5) goal difference; 6) number of goals scored.

==== Results summary ====
Overall								Home						Away					
Pld	W	D	L	GF	GA	GD	Pts	W	D	L	GF	GA	GD	W	D	L	GF	GA	GD
38	16	15	7	60	40	+20	63	11	7	1	35	15	+20	5	8	6	25	25	0

Source: La Liga

==== Results by round ====
Round	1	2	3	4	5	6	7	8	9	10	11	12	13	14	15	16	17	18	19	20	21	22	23	24	25	26	27	28	29	30	31	32	33	34	35	36	37	38
Ground	A	H	A	H	A	H	A	H	H	A	H	A	H	A	H	A	H	A	H	H	A	H	A	H	A	H	A	A	H	A	H	A	H	A	H	A	H	A
Result	L	W	D	D	W	W	L	W	W	D	W	L	D	W	D	D	W	D	W	D	D	W	D	D	L	W	D	W	D	W	W	D	L	W	D	D	W	L
Position	19	6	10	12	8	5	6	5	4	3	2	4	3	3	3	3	2	2	2	2	3	2	2	2	3	2	4	4	4	3	3	3	4	3	3	3	3	4

Source: Competitive Matches
A = Away; H = Home; W = Win; D = Draw; L = Loss; = Leader, 2000-01 UEFA Champions League group stage; = 2000-01 UEFA Champions League group stage; = 2000-01 UEFA Champions League qualifying round; = 2000-01 UEFA Cup; = 2000 UEFA Intertoto Cup; = 2000-01 Segunda Division; C = Real Madrid qualified directly for the 2000–01 UEFA Champions League as holders. As a result, Zaragoza lost their spot in the UEFA Champions League and had to participate in the UEFA Cup.

==== Matches ====
22 August 2000 1	FC Barcelona	2-0	Real Zaragoza	Barcelona
	Figo 76', Dani 78'			Stadium: Camp Nou

28 August 2000 2	Zaragoza	4-0	Real Oviedo	Zaragoza
	Jamelli 5'; Marcos Vales 7'; Vellisca 66'; Milošević 90'			Stadium: La Romareda

12 September 2000 3	Sevilla	0-0	Zaragoza	Seville
				Stadium: Sanchez Pizjuan

19 September 1999 4	Real Zaragoza	1-1	Atlético Madrid	Zaragoza
	Milošević 18'		27' Hasselbaink	Stadium: La Romareda

25 September 1999 5	Rayo Vallecano	0-1	Real Zaragoza	Vallecas
			65' Milošević	Stadium: Campo Vallecas

3 October 1999 6	Zaragoza	2-0	Real Sociedad	Zaragoza
	Aragon 62'; Milošević 89'			Stadium: La Romareda

13 October 1999 7	Celta de Vigo	2-1	Real Zaragoza	Vigo
	Caceres 36'; Mostovoi 54'		28' Milošević	Stadium: Balaidos

17 October 1999 8	Real Zaragoza	3-0	RCD Mallorca	Zaragoza
	Milošević 52' (pen.); Milošević 58'; Acuña 89'			Stadium: La Romareda

24 September 1999 9	Real Zaragoza	4-1	Racing Santander	Zaragoza
	Milošević 29', 75', 89'; Juanele 49'		82' Tais	Stadium: La Romareda

31 October 1999 10	RCD Espanyol	1-1	Real Zaragoza	Barcelona
	90' Mauricio Pochettino		Acuña 31'	Stadium: Olimpic

7 November 1999 11	Real Zaragoza	2-1	Deportivo Alavés	Zaragoza
	Milošević 3', 60'		76' Kodro	Stadium: La Romareda

21 November 1999 12	Real Betis	2-0	Real Zaragoza	Seville
	Finidi George 23', 53' (pen.)			Stadium: Benito Villamarin

28 November 1999 13	Real Zaragoza	1-1	Real Valladolid	Zaragoza
	Milošević 10'		78' Victor Fernandez	Stadium: La Romareda

4 December 1999 14	Real Madrid	1-5	Real Zaragoza	Madrid
	Raul Gonzalez 53'		29'Milošević; 39' Juanele; 45'Juanele; 54' Garitano; 68' Milošević	Stadium: Santiago Bernabeu

12 December 1999 15	Zaragoza	3-3	CD Numancia	Zaragoza
	Yordi 40', 70'; Martin Vellisca 80'		28' Ruben Navarro; 73' Ruben Navarro; 49' Constantin Barbu	Stadium: La Romareda

19 December 1999 16	Athletic Bilbao	2-2	Real Zaragoza	Bilbao
	Santi Ezquerro 13'; Jose Maria Lacruz 37'		30' Martin Vellisca; 34' (pen.)Milošević	Stadium: San Mamés

22 December 1999 17	Real Zaragoza	2-1	Deportivo La Coruña	Zaragoza
	Milošević 18'; Juanele 55'		74' Turu Flores	Stadium: La Romareda

5 January 2000 18	Málaga CF	0-0	Real Zaragoza	Málaga
				Stadium: La Rosaleda

9 January 2000 19	Real Zaragoza	4-2	Valencia CF	Zaragoza
	Juanele Castaño 26'; Juanele Castaño 68'; Milošević 32'; Radimov 58'		24' (pen.)Mendieta; 66'Mendieta	Stadium: La Romareda

16 January 2000 20	Real Zaragoza	0-0	FC Barcelona	Zaragoza
				Stadium: La Romareda

23 January 2000 21	Real Oviedo	1-0	Real Zaragoza	Oviedo
	Dely Valdes 63' (pen.)			Stadium: Carlos Tartiere

30 January 2000 22	Real Zaragoza	2-1	Sevilla CF	Zaragoza
	Juanele Castaño 4'; Aguado 57'		78'Vassilis Tsartas	Stadium: La Romareda

6 February 2000 23	Atlético Madrid	2-2	Real Zaragoza	Madrid
	Hasselbaink 19' (pen.); Hasselbaink 54'		81'Yordi Gonzalez; 83' Garitano	Stadium: Vicente Calderon

13 February 2000 24	Real Zaragoza	1-1	Rayo Vallecano	Zaragoza
	Yordi Gonzalez 14'		82' Michel Carrilero	Stadium: La Romareda

20 February 2000 25	Real Sociedad	2-1	Real Zaragoza	San Sebastián
	Mikel Aranburu 8'; Loren Juarros 90'		83' (pen.) Ander Garitano	Stadium: Anoeta

27 February 2000 26	Real Zaragoza	2-1	Celta de Vigo	Zaragoza
	Acuña 52'; Milošević 72'		38'McCarthy	Stadium: La Romareda

5 March 2000 27	RCD Mallorca	1-1	Real Zaragoza	Palma de Mallorca
	Carlos Dominguez 18'		45' (pen.) Ander Garitano	Stadium: Son Moix

12 March 2000 28	Racing Santander	1-2	Real Zaragoza	Santander
	Pedro Munitis 15'		79'Yordi; 89'Yordi	Stadium: El Sardinero

19 March 2000 29	Real Zaragoza	1-1	RCD Espanyol	Zaragoza
	Juanele Castaño 9'		55' Moises Arteaga	Stadium: La Romareda

25 March 2000 30	Deportivo Alavés	0-2	Real Zaragoza	Vitoria-Gasteiz
			Acuña 82'; Acuña 85'

1 April 2000 31	Real Zaragoza	1-0	Real Betis	Zaragoza
	Yordi 46'			Stadium: La Romareda

9 April 2000 32	Real Valladolid	1-1	Real Zaragoza	Valladolid
	Victor 72' (pen.)		63'Marcos Vales	Stadium: Jose Zorrilla

15 April 2000 33	Real Zaragoza	0-1	Real Madrid	Zaragoza
			Raul Gonzalez 85' (pen.)	Stadium: La Romareda

22 April 2000 34	Numancia	1-2	Real Zaragoza
	Ivan Rocha 45' (pen.)		1' Yordi; 6' Yordi

30 April 2000 35	Real Zaragoza	0-0	Athletic Bilbao	Zaragoza
				Stadium: La Romareda

7 May 2000 36	Deportivo La Coruña	2-2	Real Zaragoza	La Coruña
	Makaay 60'; Djalminha 78'		54' Juanele; 84' Aguado	Stadium: Riazor

14 May 2000 37	Real Zaragoza	3-2	Málaga CF	Zaragoza
	Marcos Vales 30'; Yordi 86'; Milošević 89'		29'Rufete; 62' (o.g.) Paco Jemez	Stadium: La Romareda

19 May 2000 38	Valencia CF	2-1	Zaragoza	Valencia
	Gary Sundgren 59' (o.g.), Claudio Lopez 70'		5' Savo Milošević	Stadium: Mestalla

=== Copa del Rey ===
==== First round ====
10 November 1999 First leg	Recreativo	1–1	Zaragoza	Huelva
--:-- CEST (UTC+2)

1 December 1999 Second leg	Zaragoza	4–0 (4–0 agg.)	Recreativo	Zaragoza
--:-- CEST (UTC+2)				Stadium: La Romareda

==== Second round ====
15 December 1999 Second leg	Zaragoza	2–1	Racing Santander	Zaragoza
--:-- CEST (UTC+2)				Stadium: La Romareda

12 January 2000 First leg	Racing Santander	1–4 (2–6 agg.)	Zaragoza	Huelva
--:-- CEST (UTC+2)

==== Round of 16 ====
19 January 2000 Second leg	Zaragoza	0–0	Real Madrid	Zaragoza
--:-- CEST (UTC+2)				Stadium: La Romareda

3 February 2000 First leg	Real Madrid	2–0 (2–0 agg.)	Zaragoza	Madrid
--:-- CEST (UTC+2)

== Statistics ==
=== Players statistics ===
No.	Pos	Nat	Player	Total		La Liga		Copa del Rey	
No.	Pos	Nat	Player	Apps	Goals	Apps	Goals	Apps	Goals
1	GK	(Spain) ESP	Juanmi	43	-42	37	-38	6	-4
16	DF	(Argentina) ARG	Pablo Díaz	32	1	27	0	5	1
6	DF	(Spain) ESP	Xabi Aguado	34	2	29	1	5	1
23	DF	(Spain) ESP	Paco Jemez	39	0	34	0	5	0
22	DF	(Sweden) SWE	Gary Sundgren	32	0	28	0	4	0
8	MF	(Spain) ESP	Santi Aragon	37	1	29+4	1	0+4	0
20	MF	(Paraguay) PAR	Roberto Acuña	34	6	29+2	5	3	1
11	MF	(Spain) ESP	Martin Vellisca	39	3	29+5	3	4+1	0
10	MF	(Spain) ESP	Ander Garitano	35	5	23+7	4	5	1
7	FW	(Spain) ESP	Juanele	40	9	29+5	9	5+1	0
9	FW	(Federal Republic of Yugoslavia) YUG	Milošević	42	22	37	21	4+1	1
13	GK	(Spain) ESP	Lainez	2	-2	1+1	-2	0	0
5	DF	(Italy) ITA	Lanna	20	0	17+2	0	1	0
24	MF	(Spain) ESP	Marcos Vales	28	3	14+10	3	1+3	0
4	DF	(Spain) ESP	Cuartero	22	0	10+9	0	3	0
17	MF	(Spain) ESP	Luis Helguera	21	0	10+6	0	5	0
19	FW	(Spain) ESP	Yordi	29	13	9+14	9	3+3	4
12	FW	(Brazil) BRA	Jamelli	16	1	8+7	1	1	0
2	MF	(Russia) RUS	Radimov	13	2	8+2	1	2+1	1
14	MF	(Spain) ESP	Jose Ignacio	19	0	5+11	0	3	0
3	DF	(Spain) ESP	Solana	9	0	5+3	0	1	0
21	DF	(Argentina) ARG	Martínez	3	0	0+1	0	0+2	0
2	DF	(Spain) ESP	Álvaro Rubio	0	0	0	0		
25	GK	(Spain) ESP	Moso	0	0	0	0	0	0
27	FW	(Spain) ESP	Raul Rodriguez	0	0	0	0		
15	MF	(Spain) ESP	Camacho	0	0	0	0		

- Source: https://www.bdfutbol.com/en/t/t1999-0039.html
