= Dejan Marković =

Dejan Marković may refer to:

- Dejan Marković (Serbian footballer) (born 1973)
- Dejan Markovic (Swiss footballer) (born 1975)
