= 1994–95 La Liga =

64th season of La Liga

La Liga
- Season: 1994–95
- Dates: 3 September 1994 – 18 June 1995
- Champions: Real Madrid; 26th title
- Relegated: Logroñés
- Champions League: Real Madrid
- UEFA Cup: Real Betis; Barcelona; Sevilla
- Cup Winners' Cup: Deportivo La Coruña; Zaragoza
- Matches: 380
- Goals: 966 (2.54 per match)
- Top goalscorer: Iván Zamorano (28 goals)

The 1994–95 La Liga season was the 64th since its establishment. It began on 3 September 1994, and concluded on 18 June 1995.

This was the final season in which two points were awarded for a win; going forward this changed to three points.

== Team information ==
=== Clubs and locations ===
Location of teams in La Liga 1994–95
Canary Islands

Team	Stadium	Capacity
Barcelona	Camp Nou	98,772
Real Madrid	Santiago Bernabéu	80,354
Atlético Madrid	Vicente Calderón	55,005
Valencia	Mestalla	55,000
Real Betis	Benito Villamarín	52,132
Sevilla	Ramón Sánchez Pizjuán	45,500
Espanyol	Sarrià	44,000
Athletic Bilbao	San Mamés	39,750
Deportivo de La Coruña	Riazor	34,600
Real Zaragoza	La Romareda	34,596
Celta de Vigo	Estadio Balaídos	32,500
Real Sociedad	Anoeta	32,200
Valladolid	José Zorrilla	27,846
Sporting de Gijón	El Molinón	25,885
Real Oviedo	Carlos Tartiere	23,500
Tenerife	Heliodoro Rodríguez López	22,824
Racing de Santander	El Sardinero	22,222
Albacete	Carlos Belmonte	18,000
Compostela	San Lázaro	12,000
Logroñés	Las Gaunas	9,552

== League table ==
Pos	Team	Pld	W	D	L	GF	GA	GD	Pts	Qualification or relegation
1	Real Madrid (C)	38	23	9	6	76	29	+47	55	Qualification for the Champions League group stage
2	Deportivo La Coruña	38	20	11	7	68	32	+36	51	Qualification for the Cup Winners' Cup first round (Note: Deportivo entered UEFA Cup Winners' Cup as winners of 1994–95 Copa del Rey.)
3	Real Betis	38	15	16	7	46	25	+21	46 (Note: BAR 1–1 BET; BET 1–1 BAR)	Qualification for the UEFA Cup first round
4	Barcelona	38	18	10	10	60	45	+15	46	Qualification for the UEFA Cup first round
5	Sevilla (Note: On July 31, 1995, Sevilla and Celta Vigo were relegated to Segunda División B for not providing documentation (an audit) nor making their payments to the Royal Spanish Football Federation within the time limit. The two best qualified teams to be relegated, Albacete and Valladolid were readmitted to La Liga. Later, Sevilla and Celta Vigo claimed that according to the law they had another 15 working days because they made allegations days before. Finally, the solution was to not relegate any involved team and expand the league to 22 teams for the next two seasons.)	38	16	11	11	55	41	+14	43 (Note: SEV: 7 pts; ESP: 3 pts; ZAR: 2 pts)	Qualification for the UEFA Cup first round
6	Espanyol (Note: RCD Español was renamed RCD Espanyol in February 1995.)	38	14	15	9	51	35	+16	43	
7	Zaragoza	38	18	7	13	56	51	+5	43	Qualification for the Cup Winners' Cup first round (Note: Zaragoza was qualified directly for the 1995–96 UEFA Cup Winners' Cup as defending champions.)
8	Athletic Bilbao	38	16	10	12	39	42	−3	42	
9	Oviedo	38	13	13	12	45	42	+3	39	
10	Valencia	38	13	12	13	53	48	+5	38 (Note: RSO 0–2 VAL; VAL 4–2 RSO)	
11	Real Sociedad	38	12	14	12	56	44	+12	38	
12	Racing Santander	38	13	10	15	42	47	−5	36 (Note: CEL 2–1 RAC; RAC 2–0 CEL)	
13	Celta Vigo	38	11	14	13	36	48	−12	36	
14	Atlético Madrid	38	13	9	16	56	54	+2	35 (Note: TEN 1–0 ATM; ATM 3–1 TEN)	
15	Tenerife	38	13	9	16	57	57	0	35	
16	Compostela	38	11	12	15	44	56	−12	34 (Note: ALB 1–3 COM; COM 0–0 ALB)	
17	Albacete	38	10	14	14	44	61	−17	34	Qualification for the relegation playoffs
18	Sporting Gijón (O)	38	8	12	18	42	67	−25	28	Qualification for the relegation playoffs
19	Valladolid	38	8	9	21	25	63	−38	25	
20	Logroñés (R)	38	2	9	27	15	79	−64	13	Relegation to the Segunda División

Source: LFP
Rules for classification: 1) points; 2) head-to-head points; 3) head-to-head goal difference; 4) head-to-head goals scored; 5) goal difference; 6) number of goals scored.
(C) Champions; (O) Play-off winners; (R) Relegated

== Results ==
Home \ Away	ALB	ATH	ATM	FCB	BET	CEL	COM	RCD	ESP	LOG	RAC	RMA	ROV	RSO	SFC	RSG	TEN	VCF	VLD	ZAR
Albacete		1–2	2–2	2–2	3–1	1–1	1–3	2–8	1–1	0–0	2–0	1–1	1–0	0–1	1–1	1–2	2–1	1–0	1–0	0–3
Athletic Bilbao	1–2		3–1	0–2	1–0	1–1	1–0	0–2	1–3	1–0	2–0	1–1	1–0	0–0	0–2	2–0	3–2	2–1	1–1	1–0
Atlético Madrid	4–0	2–1		2–0	0–2	0–2	1–1	1–1	3–1	3–0	0–1	0–2	3–3	2–1	2–2	3–2	3–1	2–4	6–0	2–0
Barcelona	0–1	1–0	4–3		1–1	1–1	4–0	1–1	3–0	3–0	2–1	1–0	1–0	1–1	0–1	3–1	1–0	0–0	4–1	3–0
Betis	4–1	0–0	2–0	1–1		1–1	1–0	0–0	3–1	1–0	2–0	0–0	0–0	0–0	2–1	5–0	3–0	1–1	1–2	0–1
Celta de Vigo	0–0	1–1	1–0	2–4	0–2		1–2	0–2	1–2	0–1	2–1	0–2	0–0	2–1	0–0	2–0	3–2	0–0	1–0	0–0
Compostela	0–0	0–1	2–1	1–2	1–1	2–0		0–1	1–1	2–0	2–1	1–1	1–1	0–2	0–4	3–2	2–0	1–1	1–0	3–2
Deportivo La Coruña	2–1	0–0	0–1	1–0	2–0	1–2	1–0		1–1	5–0	3–0	0–0	2–2	3–1	5–1	2–1	4–1	3–1	4–0	3–3
Espanyol	5–1	3–1	2–0	0–0	0–0	0–0	2–0	1–0		2–0	2–0	1–2	4–2	0–0	2–2	1–1	0–0	5–0	3–0	2–0
Logroñés	1–1	0–1	0–0	1–4	0–0	0–3	0–4	0–1	1–1		0–1	1–4	0–2	0–4	0–2	1–3	4–2	2–2	0–0	0–0
Racing Santander	2–1	0–2	0–0	5–0	0–0	2–0	2–2	1–2	0–0	3–0		3–1	2–0	0–0	0–3	0–0	2–1	3–2	0–0	0–1
Real Madrid	0–0	4–0	4–2	5–0	0–2	4–0	1–1	2–1	1–0	2–0	3–1		2–0	0–0	2–0	4–0	4–2	3–1	1–0	3–0
Oviedo	1–3	1–1	1–0	0–0	0–0	2–2	2–2	2–0	3–0	1–0	3–1	3–2		3–0	1–0	1–0	1–2	1–0	1–0	2–1
Real Sociedad	2–0	5–0	3–1	1–1	1–1	2–3	1–1	1–3	2–0	6–0	0–1	1–1	3–1		0–0	2–2	5–2	0–2	3–0	1–2
Sevilla	0–2	0–0	2–2	4–2	0–1	2–3	3–0	0–0	3–0	1–0	1–3	1–4	1–1	2–0		5–1	1–2	1–1	1–0	2–1
Sporting Gijón	3–2	1–1	0–2	2–1	1–1	0–0	1–1	3–1	0–0	2–2	2–3	1–0	1–1	1–2	3–0		1–1	1–0	1–3	1–3
Tenerife	2–2	1–0	1–0	2–1	1–4	3–0	2–0	1–1	1–1	4–0	3–0	0–1	1–1	3–0	0–0	3–0		1–2	0–0	2–0
Valencia	3–3	3–1	0–0	1–2	2–1	1–0	4–1	1–2	0–0	3–0	1–1	1–2	1–0	4–2	0–1	0–0	2–1		3–0	3–0
Valladolid	1–1	0–1	0–1	1–3	0–2	1–1	2–0	0–0	0–4	2–1	1–1	0–5	2–1	1–1	0–4	2–0	1–4	2–0		2–0
Zaragoza	1–0	1–4	3–1	2–1	3–0	4–0	5–3	1–0	1–0	3–0	1–1	3–2	2–1	1–1	0–1	3–2	2–2	2–2	1–0	

Updated to match(es) played on unknown. Source: LFP (in Spanish)
Legend: Blue = home team win; Yellow = draw; Red = away team win.

== Relegation play-offs ==
Team 1	Agg.	Team 2	1st leg	2nd leg
UD Salamanca	5–2	Albacete Balompié	0–2	5–0 (aet)
UE Lleida	4–5	Sporting Gijón	2–2	2–3

=== First leg ===
21 June 1995	UD Salamanca	0–2	Albacete Balompié	Villares de la Reina
21:30		Report (in Spanish)	Bjelica 17'; Zalazar 62'	Stadium: Helmántico; Attendance: 17,000; Referee: José María García-Aranda (Community of Madrid)

22 June 1995	UE Lleida	2–2	Sporting Gijón	Lleida
21:30	Salillas 20'; Roa 90'	Report (in Spanish)	Sabou 34'; Pier 51'	Stadium: Camp d'Esports; Attendance: 10,000; Referee: Juan Fernández Marín (Community of Madrid)

=== Second leg ===
27 June 1995	Albacete Balompié	0–5 (a.e.t.) (2–5 agg.)	UD Salamanca	Albacete
21:30		Report (in Spanish)	Torrecilla 40'; Urzaiz 90', 110'; Antonio Díaz 115'; Vellisca 120'	Stadium: Carlos Belmonte; Attendance: 17,000; Referee: Juan Manuel Brito Arceo (Canary Islands)

28 June 1995	Sporting Gijón	3–2 (5–4 agg.)	UE Lleida	Gijón
21:30	Lediakhov 51'; Sabou 65'; Pier 77'	Report (in Spanish)	David 56'; Salillas 85'	Stadium: El Molinón; Attendance: 42,000; Referee: Antonio Jesús López Nieto (Andalusia)

== Top goalscorers ==
Rank	Player	Club	Goals
1	(Chile) Iván Zamorano	Real Madrid	28
2	(Bosnia and Herzegovina) Meho Kodro	Real Sociedad	25
3	(Bosnia and Herzegovina) Vladimir Gudelj	Celta Vigo	17
3	(Croatia) Davor Šuker	Sevilla	17
5	(Brazil) Bebeto	Deportivo La Coruña	16
5	(Argentina) Juan Esnáider	Zaragoza	16
7	(Argentina) Juan Antonio Pizzi	Tenerife	15
8	(Spain) Carlos	Oviedo	14
8	(Spain) Ángel Cuéllar	Real Betis	14
8	(Nigeria) Ohen	Compostela	14

== Attendances ==
#	Club	Avg. attendance	Highest
1	Real Madrid	95,000	110,000
2	FC Barcelona	78,316	108,000
3	Valencia CF	45,263	49,000
4	Atlético de Madrid	44,053	65,000
5	Real Betis	37,921	47,500
6	Sevilla FC	36,368	61,000
7	Athletic Club	34,158	46,000
8	RCD Espanyol	27,526	40,000
9	Real Zaragoza	26,842	37,000
10	Deportivo de La Coruña	26,158	32,000
11	Celta de Vigo	21,316	30,000
12	Real Sociedad	20,119	30,000
13	Real Sporting de Gijón	19,500	25,500
14	Real Racing Club	18,506	25,000
15	CD Tenerife	17,237	24,000
16	Real Oviedo	15,608	23,210
17	Real Valladolid	15,484	30,000
18	Albacete Balompié	11,474	16,000
19	SD Compostela	10,074	13,900
20	CD Logroñés	9,711	15,000
