= Nicolae Bălcescu, Bacău =

Nicolae Bălcescu
- Commune
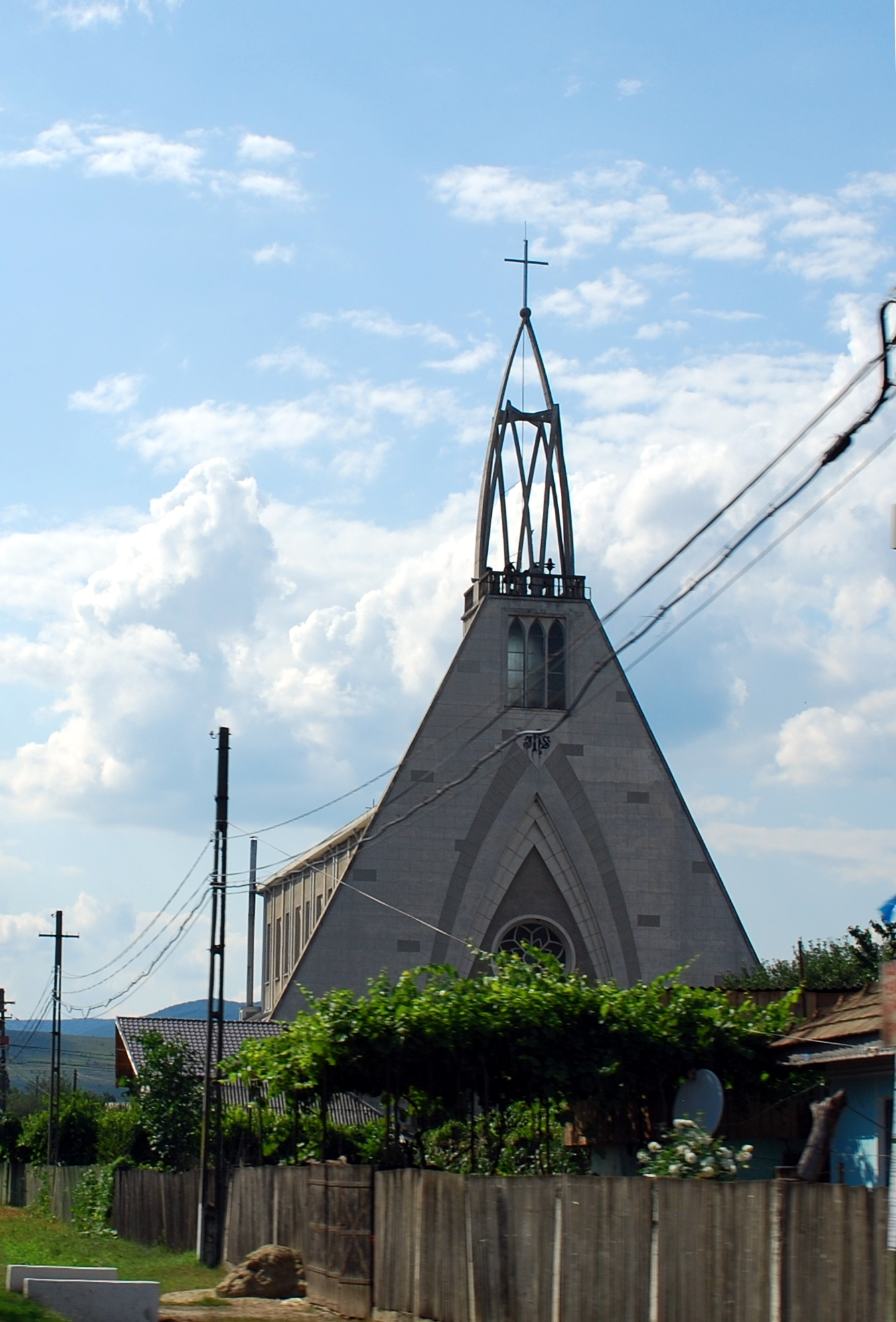
- Roman catholic church in Nicolae Bălcescu

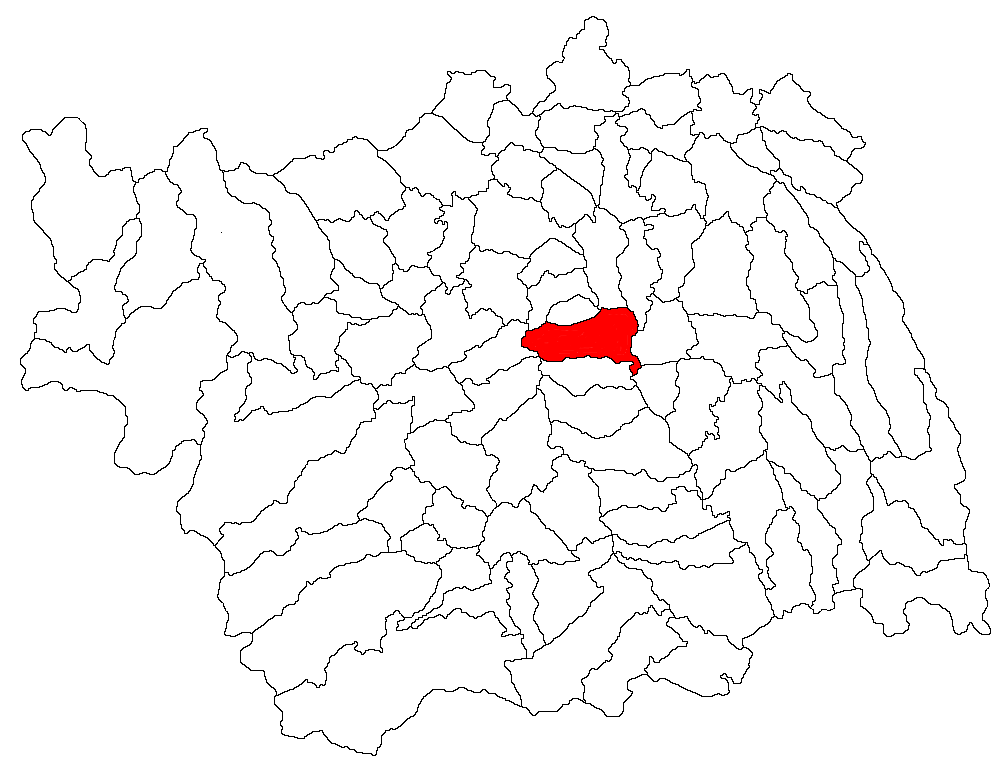
- Location in Bacău County

- Location in Romania
- Coordinates: 46°29′N 26°54′E
- Country: Romania
- County: Bacău

Government
  - Mayor (2024–2028): Marcelin Iosif Trifescu (ADU)
- Area: 77.5 km^{2} (29.9 sq mi)
- Elevation: 185 m (607 ft)
- Population (2021-12-01): 8,539
  - Density: 110/km^{2} (285/sq mi)
- Time zone: UTC+02:00 (EET)
  - Summer (DST): UTC+03:00 (EEST)
- Postal code: 607355
- Area code: +(40) 0234
- Vehicle reg.: BC
- Website: primaria-nicolae-balcescu.ro

Nicolae Bălcescu (until 1948 Ferdinand, and previously Satu Nou, Hungarian: Ferdinándújfalu) is a commune in Bacău County, Western Moldavia, Romania. It is composed of five villages: Buchila, Galbeni, Lărguța, Nicolae Bălcescu, and Valea Seacă. It also included Bălțata and Sărata villages until 2004, when they were split off to form Sărata Commune.

The commune is located in the central part of the county, just south of the county seat, Bacău. It lies on the right banks of the rivers Bistrița and Siret; the two rivers meet at the Galbeni reservoir, on the east side of the commune.

Nicolae Bălcescu is crossed by the DN2 road, which connects Bacău to Focșani and forms part of the European route E85. The CFR rail line from Bacău to Mărășești, which also passes through the commune, is served by the Valea Seacă station.

According to the 2011 census, the commune has 7,169 inhabitants; 90.14% of them were ethnic Romanians and 1.28% ethnic Hungarians. At the 2021 census, Nicolae Bălcescu had a population of 8,539, of which 87.76% were Romanians and 1.28% Hungarians.
