= Ovidiu Cuc =

Romanian footballer

Personal information
- Full name: Ovidiu Lucian Cuc
- Date of birth: 14 January 1973 (age 53)
- Place of birth: Timișoara, Romania
- Height: 1.82 m (6 ft 0 in)
- Positions: Midfielder; forward

Team information
- Current team: Poli Timisoara (board member)

Senior career*
Years	Team	Apps	(Gls)
1990–1993	Poli Timișoara	55	(12)
1993–1995	Mérida	46	(5)
1995–1996	Atlético Marbella	15	(4)
1996–1998	Chaves	47	(7)
1998–1999	Santa Clara	9	(2)
1998	→ Voloholyev (loan)	14	(5)
1999	→ Anzhi Makhachkala (loan)	8	(0)
1999–2000	Gil Vicente	27	(2)
2000–2001	Ashdod	24	(4)
2001–2002	Poli Timișoara	25	(8)
2002–2003	Famalicão	15	(1)
2003–2005	Ataense	26	(7)
2005–2008	Poli Timișoara	64	(12)
2008–2010	CSM Lugoj	41	(8)
2010–2011	Phoenix Buziaş	18	(5)
Total		422	(82)

International career
1989	Romania U16	5	(0)
1990	Romania U17	3	(0)

Managerial career
- 2022–2023: Poli Timisoara (president)
- 2023–: Poli Timisoara (board member)
- * Club domestic league appearances and goals

Ovidiu Lucian Cuc (born 14 January 1973) is a Romanian retired professional football player.

Aside from playing in his native home of Romania, Cuc played the majority of his career abroad, most notably in Portugal where he played for Chaves, Santa Clara, Gil Vicente, Famalicão and Ataense.

Cuc was part of the Romanian under-16 national team who played in the 1989 UEFA European Under-16 Championship.

In October 2022, he became president of Poli Timisoara.

== Honours ==
Mérida

- Segunda División: 1994–95

Anzhi Makhachkala

- Russian Second Division: 1999

Poli Timisoara

- Liga II: 2001–02
- Cupa Romaniei: runner-up 2006–07
