= Sărata mine =

Salt mine in Romania

- Location: Sărata, Bacău County, Romania
- Products: Sodium chloride
- Company: Salrom

The Sărata mine is a large salt mine located in eastern Romania in Bacău County, close to Sărata. Sărata represents one of the largest salt reserves in Romania having estimated reserves of 2.2 billion tonnes of NaCl.
