= Sărata, Bacău =

Sărata
- Commune
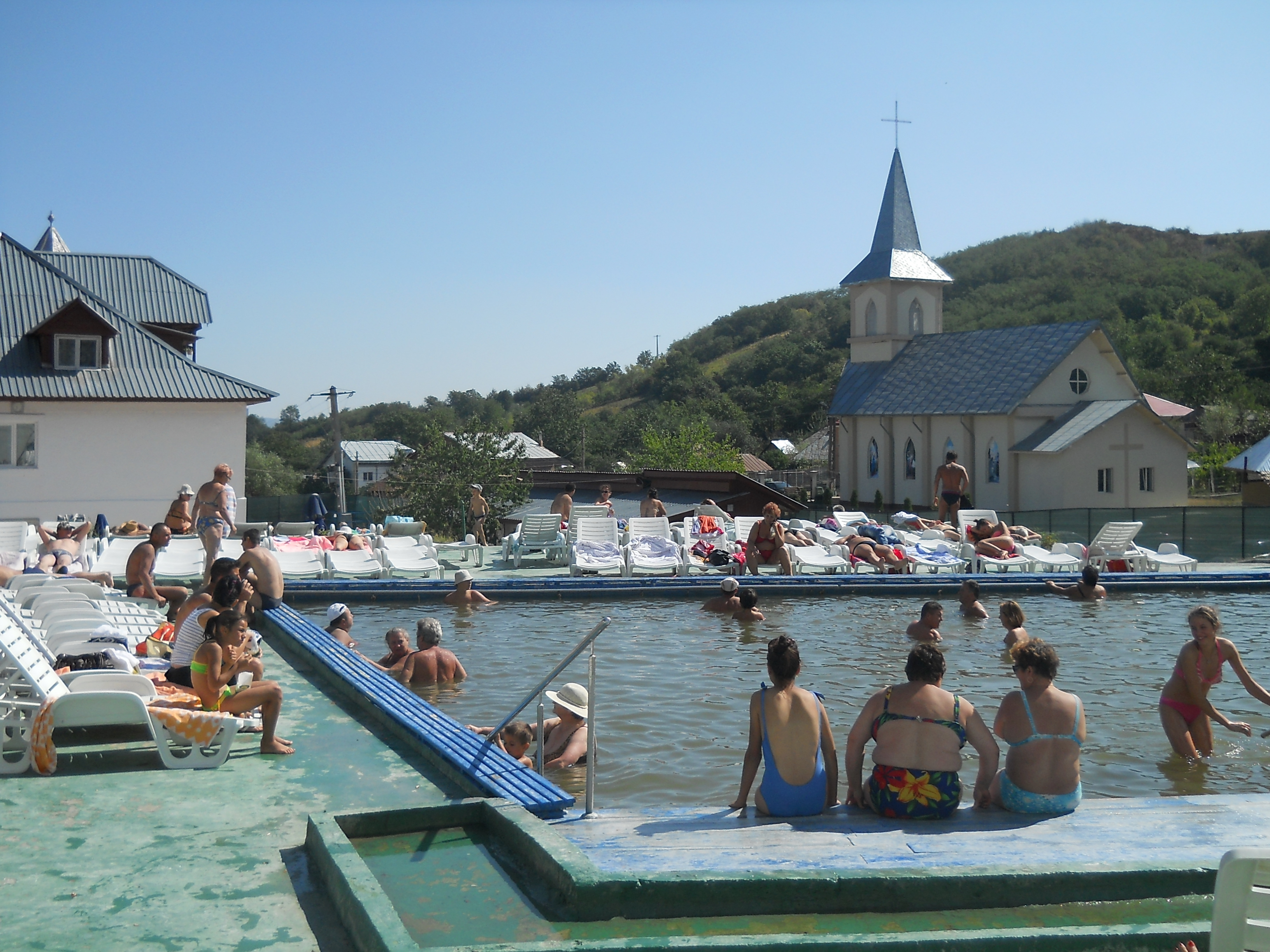
- The Sărata Baths

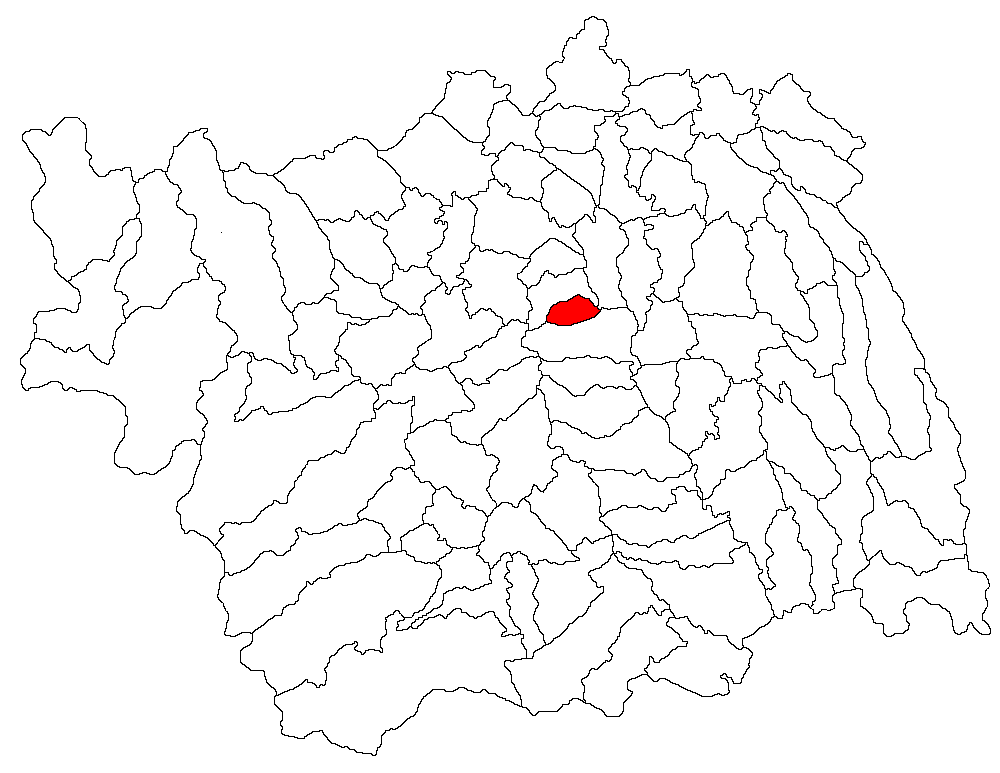
- Location in Bacău County

- Location in Romania
- Coordinates: 46°30′N 26°52′E
- Country: Romania
- County: Bacău

Government
  - Mayor (2024–2028): Irina Argatu (PSD)
- Area: 24.80 km^{2} (9.58 sq mi)
- Elevation: 233 m (764 ft)
- Population (2021-12-01): 2,257
  - Density: 91.01/km^{2} (235.7/sq mi)
- Time zone: UTC+02:00 (EET)
  - Summer (DST): UTC+03:00 (EEST)
- Postal code: 607361
- Area code: +(40) 234
- Vehicle reg.: BC
- Website: comuna-sarata.ro

Sărata is a commune in Bacău County, Western Moldavia, Romania. It is composed of two villages, Bălțata and Sărata. These were part of Nicolae Bălcescu Commune until 2004, when they were split off.

The commune is located in the central part of Bacău County, 8.8 km (5.5 mi) southwest of the county seat, Bacău, just west of the George Enescu International Airport. It also borders the following communes: Luizi-Călugăra to the north, Nicolae Bălcescu to the south, and Sănduleni to the west. Sărata is crossed by county road DJ119, which connects Bacău to the city of Onești. Close to the commune is a large salt mine.

Historical population
Year	Pop.	±%
2002	1,920	—
2011	1,914	−0.3%
2021	2,257	+17.9%
Source: Census data

At the 2011 census, the commune had 1,914 inhabitants; of those, 99.8% of were ethnic Romanians. At the 2021 census, the population had increased to 2,257, of which 92.16% were Romanians.

== Natives ==
- Gheorghe Viscreanu (born 1961), footballer
