= Gheorghe Viscreanu =

Romanian footballer

Personal information
- Date of birth: 19 August 1961 (age 65)
- Place of birth: Sărata, Bacău, Romania
- Height: 1.71 m (5 ft 7 in)
- Position: Right back

Youth career
- LPEF Bacău
- SC Bacău
- Luceafărul București

Senior career*
Years	Team	Apps	(Gls)
1980–1987	SC Bacău	154	(15)
1981	→ Steaua București (loan)	0	(0)
1988	Flacăra Moreni	17	(0)
1988–1989	Dinamo București	19	(1)
1990–1991	Rayo Vallecano	12	(0)
Total		202	(16)

International career
1980	Romania U18		
1981	Romania U20	2	(0)
Medal record
Representing Romania
FIFA World Youth Championship
Bronze medal – third place	FIFA U-20 World Cup	1981
- * Club domestic league appearances and goals

Gheorghe Viscreanu (born 19 August 1961) is a Romanian former footballer who played as a right defender.

== Club career ==
Viscreanu was born on 19 August 1961 in Sărata, Bacău, Romania. He began playing junior-level football at LPEF Bacău, afterwards moving to SC Bacău and then to Luceafărul București. Subsequently, he made his Divizia A debut on 10 June 1981 under coach Angelo Niculescu in SC Bacău's 6–2 away loss to Universitatea Craiova. In the summer of 1981, he went to play for Steaua București where he was wanted by one of his former coaches from Bacău, Traian Ionescu. However, he spent only half a season there without playing and returned to Bacău. There, in the first two years Viscreanu played rarely, but he started to play more often in 1983 when coach Constantin Rădulescu came to the club. Afterwards he became the team's captain and was transferred in 1988 to Flacăra Moreni. Viscreanu joined Mircea Lucescu's Dinamo București for the 1988–89 season. The Red Dogs reached the 1989 Cupa României final, but he did not play in the 1–0 loss to rivals Steaua. He also played two matches in the 1988–89 European Cup Winners' Cup, a 3–0 win over Kuusysi Lahti and a 1–1 draw against Dundee United, as the team reached the quarter-finals. On 20 June 1989 he made his last Divizia A appearance in Dinamo's 0–0 draw against his former side, SC Bacău, totaling 190 games with 16 goals in the competition. In 1989, Viscreanu defected to Spain, signing with Rayo Vallecano. He made 12 appearances for them during the 1990–91 Segunda División season, after which he retired at age 29 because of medical problems.

== International career ==
Viscreanu was part of Romania's under-18 national team that participated in the 1980 European Under-18 Championship.

He was selected by coach Constantin Cernăianu to be part of Romania's under-20 squad for the 1981 World Youth Championship held in Australia. Viscreanu appeared in two games, a 1–1 draw against Brazil and a 1–0 win over South Korea, helping the team finish the tournament in third position, winning the bronze medal.

== Defections from Communist Romania ==
Viscreanu is the only footballer who managed to defect twice from Romania's communist regime, where defection was illegal at the time.

His first defection was in Australia during the 1981 World Youth Championship. He played in the first two group stage games and after the second match, a Romanian of Hungarian descent who was settled in Australia asked him if he wanted to stay in the country. One night, Viscreanu managed to escape from the hotel and got into a car parked in front of the door. His helpers brought him to their home and took care of him by buying him food and clothes. The next day all the Australian newspapers headlined his escape and he was invited to appear daily on a reality show on a TV station owned by Rupert Murdoch. However, after ten days he and his lawyer were called to the police station, where he found out he was deported to Romania. In 2019, in Barcelona, he met the lawyer who represented him in 1981. He then learned that his deportation was due to a secret agreement between dictator Nicolae Ceaușescu and Australia. This agreement allowed Romania to participate in the tournament, but stipulated that if any team member absconded, Australia was obligated to extradite them to Romania. After he came back to the country, for about seven years he was constantly harassed by Securitate officers who followed him everywhere he went and would sometimes enter his house when he was away. They also threatened him that if they caught him planning to defect they would throw him in jail, he was not even allowed to leave Bacău.

Viscreanu's second defection was in 1989 while he was playing for Dinamo București in a friendly tournament held in Madrid, Spain. Together with teammate Marcel Sabou, he sneaked out of the hotel and went to the airport. They bought tickets to Frankfurt where Sabou mentioned a friend who could assist them, but when they arrived they didn't have an entrance visa so they were sent back to Madrid. When they got back at the airport in Madrid, they found out that their visa for Spain was no longer available. A police commissioner from the airport understood their situation and allowed them to stay in the airport for two days and introduced them to some people he knew from Rayo Vallecano. They signed three-year contracts with Rayo, but did not play in the first one due to a rule at the time that mandated a one-year suspension for footballers defecting from the communist bloc before they could play again. Viscreanu and Sabou made an agreement that they would not sign a contract unless the other also signed, but Sabou did not respect this pact as he signed with Real Madrid Castilla without considering Viscreanu's situation, a decision that shattered their friendship.

== Honours ==
Dinamo București

- Cupa României runner-up: 1988–89
