= Dejan Marković (Serbian footballer) =

Serbian footballer

Personal information
- Full name: Dejan Marković
- Date of birth: 26 May 1973 (age 53)
- Place of birth: Zemun, SFR Yugoslavia
- Height: 1.81 m (5 ft 11 1/2 in)
- Position: Midfielder

Senior career*
Years	Team	Apps	(Gls)
1989–1992	Partizan	23	(1)
1993	Figueres	12	(2)
1993–1997	Logroñés	124	(17)
1997–2000	Osasuna	104	(8)
2000–2004	Admira Wacker	99	(9)
2005–2011	Naters	85	(10)
Total		447	(47)

Managerial career
- 2007–2012: Naters
- 2013–2015: Visp
- 2017–2019: Naters
- * Club domestic league appearances and goals

Dejan Marković (Serbian Cyrillic: Дејан Марковић; born 26 May 1973) is a Serbian retired footballer who played as a right midfielder, and a manager.

== Football career ==
Marković was born in Zemun, Socialist Federal Republic of Yugoslavia. He started his senior career at the age of only 16 with FK Partizan, in the Yugoslav First League.

In January 1993 Marković moved to Spain where he remained for the following seven 1/2 seasons, in representation of UE Figueres, CD Logroñés and CA Osasuna. He competed in Segunda División with all the clubs and the second in La Liga, being relegated from the latter in 1995 and 1997.

Before retiring Marković played four years in Austria with FC Admira Wacker Mödling, and six in Switzerland with FC Naters. He acted as player-coach to the second side for the vast majority of his spell.
