= Javi Delgado =

Swiss footballer (born 1980)

Personal information
- Full name: Javier Delgado Fernandez
- Date of birth: 20 May 1980 (age 46)
- Place of birth: Sion, Switzerland
- Height: 1.80 m (5 ft 11 in)
- Position: Midfielder

Senior career*
Years	Team	Apps	(Gls)
1997–2000	FC Sion		
2001	CA Osasuna B		
2001–2002	SL Benfica B		
2002–2003	Cartagonova FC		
2003–2004	Real Murcia		
2004–2006	FC Sion		
2006–2008	Neuchâtel Xamax		
- * Club domestic league appearances and goals

Javi Delgado (born 20 May 1980) is a retired Spanish-Swiss football midfielder.
