= Caco Morán =

Spanish footballer

Personal information
- Full name: Alejandro Morán Santamaría
- Date of birth: 30 April 1973 (age 53)
- Place of birth: Spain
- Position: Midfielder

Senior career*
Years	Team	Apps	(Gls)
1994–1996	Sporting de Gijón	12	(4)
1996–1997	Levante	34	(4)
1997–1998	Extremadura	31	(1)
1998–2001	Numancia	81	(14)
2001–2002	Recreativo de Huelva	26	(0)
2002–2004	Real Jaén	60	(3)
2004–2007	Real Oviedo		
2007–2009	Lealtad		

International career
- Asturias
- * Club domestic league appearances and goals

Alejandro Morán Santamaría (born 30 April 1973) is a Spanish football manager and former footballer who is an analyst for Sporting de Gijón.

== Early life ==
Morán is a native of the La Arena neighborhood. He joined the youth academy of Spanish side Sporting de Gijón at the age of nine.

== Club career ==
Morán started his career with Spanish side Sporting Atlético, where he as regarded as an important played for the club. In 2001, he signed for Spanish side Recreativo de Huelva. During his career, he achieved three promotions to the Spanish La Liga.

== International career ==
Morán played for the Asturias autonomous football team.

== Managerial career ==
After retiring from professional football, Morán worked as a youth manager.

== Personal life ==
Morán has a brother.
