= Marcos Vales =

Spanish footballer

Personal information
- Full name: Marcos Vales Illanes
- Date of birth: 5 April 1975 (age 51)
- Place of birth: A Coruña, Spain
- Height: 1.81 m (5 ft 11 1/2 in)
- Position: Midfielder

Youth career
- Deportivo La Coruña

Senior career*
Years	Team	Apps	(Gls)
1992–1993	Deportivo B	18	(6)
1993–1994	Deportivo La Coruña	19	(1)
1994–1997	Sporting Gijón	60	(3)
1997–2002	Zaragoza	103	(11)
2002–2004	Sevilla	40	(3)
2004–2005	Mallorca	6	(0)
Total		246	(24)

International career
1993	Spain U18	4	(2)
1993–1998	Spain U21	15	(1)
1998	Spain	1	(0)
- * Club domestic league appearances and goals

Marcos Vales Illanes (born 5 April 1975) is a Spanish former professional footballer who played as a midfielder.

== Club career ==
Born in A Coruña, Vales made his professional debut with local Deportivo de La Coruña. As Super Depor came to fruition, he was sparingly used during his two-year spell with the Galicians, leaving at the age of 19; only linked to the club with an amateur contract, he moved to Asturias and signed for Sporting de Gijón, with Deportivo president Augusto César Lendoiro proceeding to engage in a lengthy court battle, which was eventually resolved in the footballer's favour.

After three seasons with Sporting, only starting in the latter as the team finished 15th in La Liga, Vales joined Real Zaragoza in the same league for 200 million pesetas. He started regularly in his first years, but was already a fringe player in the 2000–01 campaign when the Aragonese side won the Copa del Rey.

In the summer of 2002, following Zaragoza's relegation, Vales moved to Sevilla FC also of the top flight. He was first choice in his first season, notably scoring the game's only goal in a local derby against Real Betis on 2 March 2003.

Vales missed the vast majority of 2003–04, due to a foot injury. He then signed with RCD Mallorca, but suffered a relapse in his condition and eventually decided to retire at age 30, with Spanish top tier totals of 228 matches and 18 goals.

== International career ==
On 14 October 1998, Vales earned his first – and only – cap for Spain: it consisted of one minute in a 2–1 win in Israel for the UEFA Euro 2000 qualifiers after coming on as a substitute for Real Madrid's Raúl.

Previously, he helped the under-21 side win the 1998 European Championship in Romania.

== Personal life ==
Vales' father, José Pedro (born 1950), was also a footballer. He represented Deportivo for two decades.

After retiring, Vales worked in a law firm in his hometown alongside his father.

== Honours ==
Spain U21

- UEFA European Under-21 Championship: 1998
