= Antonio Díaz (footballer, born 1969) =

Spanish footballer

Personal information
- Full name: Antonio Díaz Jurado
- Date of birth: 4 August 1969
- Place of birth: Madrid, Spain
- Date of death: 27 April 2013 (aged 43)
- Height: 1.80 m (5 ft 11 in)
- Position: Midfielder

Senior career*
Years	Team	Apps	(Gls)
1989–1990	Real Madrid B	0	(0)
1990–1992	Valdepeñas	65	(7)
1992–1993	Getafe	32	(3)
1993–1995	Salamanca	61	(4)
1995–1996	Osasuna	33	(3)
1996–1999	Villarreal	92	(11)
1999–2001	Compostela	59	(4)
2001–2002	Granada	34	(2)
2002–2003	Águilas		
2003–2004	Vinaròs		
2004–2005	CF Benlloch		
Total		376	(34)
- * Club domestic league appearances and goals

Antonio Díaz Jurado (4 August 1969 – 27 April 2013) was a Spanish professional footballer who played as a midfielder.

== Club career ==
Born in Madrid, Díaz started playing with Real Madrid Castilla, moving in 1992 to neighbouring club Getafe CF. He started his professional career in 1994–95, helping UD Salamanca promote to La Liga in the playoffs.

At the professional level, Díaz also represented CA Osasuna, Villarreal CF and SD Compostela, playing with all the clubs in Segunda División and the second in the top flight in the 1998–99 season. He made his debut in the latter competition on 31 August 1998, starting in a 1–4 away loss against Real Madrid.

Díaz retired in June 2005 at nearly 36 after spells in the lower leagues, including the 2001–02 campaign with Granada CF in Segunda División B.

== Later life and death ==
After retiring, Díaz returned to Villarreal, working as youth teams manager. He died on 27 April 2013 at the age of 43, due to unknown causes.

== Honours ==
- Segunda División B: 1993–94
