= Pier Luigi Cherubino =

Italian-born Spanish footballer and manager

Pier
Personal information
- Full name: Pier Luigi Cherubino Loggi
- Date of birth: 15 October 1971 (age 55)
- Place of birth: Rome, Italy
- Height: 1.76 m (5 ft 9 1/2 in)
- Position: Striker

Youth career
- Tenerife

Senior career*
Years	Team	Apps	(Gls)
1990–1994	Tenerife	73	(15)
1994–1995	Sporting Gijón	35	(11)
1995–1997	Betis	73	(23)
1997–1998	Zaragoza	30	(1)
1998–2002	Tenerife	64	(12)
2002	Extremadura	14	(4)
2002–2003	Terrassa	9	(0)
2003–2005	Laguna		
2005–2006	Esperanza		
2006–2007	Alcalá	19	(4)
Total		317	(70)

International career
1991	Spain U19	3	(2)
1991	Spain U20	3	(3)
1991–1994	Spain U21	10	(1)
1994	Spain	1	(0)

Managerial career
- 2018–2019: Granadilla (women)
- 2019–2020: Betis (women)
Medal record
Men's football
Representing Spain
UEFA European Under-21 Championship
Bronze medal – third place	1994 France
- * Club domestic league appearances and goals

Pier Luigi Cherubino Loggi (born 15 October 1971), known simply as Pier, is a Spanish former professional footballer who played as a striker, currently a manager.

Over ten seasons, he amassed La Liga totals of 227 games and 54 goals in representation of four clubs, mainly Tenerife.

== Playing career ==
=== Club ===
Born in Rome, Italy, Pier was raised in Puerto de la Cruz, Tenerife, and made his professional debut with CD Tenerife's first team during the 1990–91 season. In 16 La Liga matches he scored one goal, in a 1–1 away draw against Real Betis on 6 January 1991, and would be relatively used in the subsequent campaigns, also appearing in the 1993–94 UEFA Cup.

Pier would develop into a top-flight attacking player in 1994–95, with Sporting de Gijón, and in his two seasons at Betis, where he formidably teamed up with former Real Madrid's Alfonso – the pair combined for 60 league goals from 1995 to 1997, finishing fourth in the latter season.

After failing to produce at Real Zaragoza, Pier returned to Tenerife, where he achieved a top-tier promotion when the team was coached by Rafael Benítez, and also played for six months in CF Extremadura alongside former Atlético Madrid great Kiko.

Pier retired in 2007 at nearly 36, after three seasons in the lower leagues.

=== International ===
Pier made his debut (his only match) for the Spain national team on 12 October 1994, in an away UEFA Euro 1996 qualifier against Macedonia, coming on as a substitute for Julio Salinas who had scored both goals in a 2–0 win.

== Coaching career ==
In October 2018, Pier was appointed at UD Granadilla Tenerife of the Spanish Primera División (women). He resigned the following May, having taken them to an all-time best fourth-place finish.

On 29 December 2019, Pier returned to Betis by taking the helm of the women's team until the end of the season.

== Honours ==
Spain U21

- UEFA European Under-21 Championship third place: 1994

== See also ==
- List of Spain international footballers born outside Spain
