= Marcel Sabou =

Romanian footballer (1965–2025)

Personal information
- Date of birth: 22 August 1965
- Place of birth: Timișoara, Romania
- Date of death: 9 June 2025 (aged 59)
- Place of death: Gijón, Asturias, Spain
- Position: Midfielder

Youth career
- Politehnica Timișoara

Senior career*
Years	Team	Apps	(Gls)
1985–1986	Politehnica Timișoara	46	(9)
1986–1989	Dinamo București	48	(0)
1989–1990	Real Madrid Castilla	7	(0)
1990–1991	Tenerife	20	(0)
1991–1993	Racing Santander	66	(9)
1993–1996	Sporting Gijón	72	(6)
1996–1998	Desportivo Chaves	59	(10)
Total		318	(34)

International career
1986–1987	Romania U21	7	(0)
- * Club domestic league appearances and goals

Marcel Sabou (22 August 1965 – 9 June 2025) was a Romanian footballer who played for Romanian sides Politehnica Timișoara and Dinamo București, Spanish clubs Real Madrid Castilla, Tenerife, Racing Santander and Sporting Gijón and Portuguese team Desportivo Chaves.

== Club career ==
Sabou was born on 22 August 1965 in Timișoara, Romania. He began playing football at local club Politehnica, making his Divizia A debut on 14 August 1985 under coach Ion Dumitru in a 1–0 away loss to Petrolul Ploiești. At the end of his first season spent at the club, they were relegated to Divizia B, but Sabou stayed with them for another half a year. Afterwards he went to play under the guidance of coach Mircea Lucescu at Dinamo București. There, he made his only appearance in European competitions, playing in a 3–0 victory against Kuusysi Lahti in the first round of the 1988–89 European Cup Winners' Cup. On 20 June 1989 he made his last Divizia A appearance in Dinamo's 0–0 home draw against SC Bacău, having a total of 77 games with five goals in the competition.

In 1989, Sabou defected to Spain, signing with Segunda División team Real Madrid Castilla. Shortly afterwards he moved to Tenerife where on 9 September 1990 under coach Xabier Azkargorta he made his La Liga debut in a 3–1 away loss to Osasuna. In 1991 he went back to Segunda División at Racing Santander, helping the team earn promotion to the first division in his second season spent there. He then went back to La Liga football, playing for Sporting Gijón, scoring his first goal in the competition on 6 March 1994 in a 2–1 away loss to Rayo Vallecano. In 1995 he scored an important goal in a relegation play-off against Lleida which helped Gijón avoid relegation. On 25 February 1996, Sabou made his last La Liga appearance in Gijón's 3–2 home loss to Espanyol, totaling 86 matches with six goals in the competition.

Afterwards he went to play for Desportivo Chaves where he was teammates with compatriot Ovidiu Cuc. Sabou made his Primeira Liga debut on 1 September 1996 under coach José Romão in a 3–3 draw against Marítimo. On 13 October he netted a brace in a 5–2 victory against Braga. He would score two more doubles in a win against Farense and a loss to Leça, netting a personal record of eight goals until the end of the season. On 17 May 1998, Sabou played his last game in the Portuguese league, a 0–0 draw against Académica, totaling 59 games with 10 goals in the competition.

== International career ==
Between 1986 and 1987, Sabou made seven appearances for Romania's under-21 squad.

== Defection from Communist Romania ==
Sabou was one of the few footballers who managed to defect from Romania's communist regime, where defection was illegal at the time. He defected in 1989 while he was playing for Dinamo București in a friendly tournament held in Madrid, Spain. Together with teammate Gheorghe Viscreanu, he sneaked out of the hotel and went to the airport. They bought tickets to Frankfurt where Sabou mentioned a friend who could assist them, but when they arrived they didn't have an entrance visa so they were sent back to Madrid. When they got back at the airport in Madrid, they found out that their visa for Spain was no longer available. A police commissioner from the airport understood their situation and allowed them to stay in the airport for two days and introduced them to some people he knew from Rayo Vallecano. They signed three-year contracts with Rayo, but did not play in the first one due to a rule at the time that mandated a one-year suspension for footballers defecting from the communist bloc before they could play again. Viscreanu and Sabou made an agreement that they would not sign a contract unless the other also signed, but Sabou did not respect this pact as he signed with Real Madrid Castilla without considering Viscreanu's situation, a decision that shattered their friendship.

== Personal life and death ==
In 2013 Sabou was diagnosed with amyotrophic lateral sclerosis, a disease that causes the death of neurons controlling voluntary muscles.

On 9 June 2025, he died of complications from amyotrophic lateral sclerosis in Gijón, Spain, at the age of 59.

== Honours ==
Politehnica Timișoara

- Divizia B: 1986–87
