= Juan Fernández Marín =

Spanish football referee

- Born: 3 December 1957 (age 68)

Domestic
Years	League	Role

International
Years	League	Role
1995–	FIFA listed	Referee

Juan Antonio Fernández Marín (born 3 December 1957 in Madrid, Spain) is a former Spanish professional football referee.
