= Martín Vellisca =

Spanish footballer

Personal information
- Full name: Martín Vellisca González
- Date of birth: 22 August 1971 (age 55)
- Place of birth: Madrid, Spain
- Height: 1.72 m (5 ft 7 1/2 in)
- Position: Winger

Senior career*
Years	Team	Apps	(Gls)
1990–1991	Atlético Madrid B	3	(1)
1991–1992	Valdepeñas	35	(7)
1992–1993	Getafe	38	(6)
1993–1999	Salamanca	219	(12)
1999–2004	Zaragoza	135	(9)
2004–2006	Almería	51	(2)
2006–2008	Logroñés	73	(4)
Total		554	(41)
- * Club domestic league appearances and goals

Martín Vellisca González (born 22 August 1971) is a Spanish former professional footballer who played as a left winger.

He played 220 La Liga matches over seven seasons, in representation of Salamanca (three years) and Zaragoza (four).

== Club career ==
Vellisca was born in Madrid. After starting out at Atlético Madrid B and amateurs CF Valdepeñas, he began his professional career at local club Getafe CF before joining UD Salamanca in 1993. He was an undisputed first-choice from the start, never playing less than 34 games while also experiencing two La Liga promotions and as many relegations to Segunda División; in the 1997–98 season, as the team retained their top-division status, he participated in a 4–1 win against eventual champions FC Barcelona at the Camp Nou.

From 1999 to 2004, Vellisca represented Real Zaragoza, totalling 104 league matches with eight goals in his first three seasons. After helping the Aragonese to a 2003 return to the top flight, he was only a fringe player the following campaign, and left the side with two Copa del Rey trophies.

Vellisca retired in 2008 at age 37, having spent two seasons each with UD Almería (second tier) and lowly Logroñés CF.

== Honours ==
Zaragoza

- Copa del Rey: 2000–01, 2003–04
