= 2022–23 Sporting de Gijón season =

Sporting de Gijón
2022–23 season
- President: Alejandro Irarragorri
- Head coach: Abelardo (until 15 January); Miguel Ángel Ramírez (from 17 January)
- Stadium: El Molinón
- Segunda División: 17th
- Copa del Rey: Round of 16
- Top goalscorer: League: Aitor García; Juan Otero (6); All: Aitor García (7)
- Biggest win: Sporting Gijón 4–1 Andorra
- Biggest defeat: Granada 5–0 Sporting Gijón
Home colours	Away colours	Third colours

The 2022–23 season was the 118th season in the history of Sporting de Gijón and their sixth consecutive season in the second division. The club participated in Segunda División and the Copa del Rey.

== Players ==
As of 14 November 2022.

Note: Flags indicate national team as defined under FIFA eligibility rules; some limited exceptions apply. Players may hold more than one non-FIFA nationality.

No.	Pos.	Nation	Player
1	GK	ESP	Iván Cuéllar
2	DF	ESP	Guille Rosas
3	DF	ESP	Cote
4	DF	ESP	Pablo Insua
5	DF	ESP	Bruno González
6	MF	ESP	José Gragera
7	FW	ESP	Aitor García
8	MF	ESP	Pedro Díaz
9	FW	ESP	Jony (on loan from Lazio)
10	MF	ESP	Nacho Méndez
11	FW	ESP	Víctor Campuzano

No.	Pos.	Nation	Player
12	FW	ESP	Cristo González (on loan from Udinese)
13	GK	ESP	Diego Mariño (captain)
15	DF	CIV	Axel Bamba
17	MF	ESP	Christian Rivera
18	MF	URU	Giovanni Zarfino
19	FW	COL	Juan Otero (on loan from América)
20	MF	MEX	Jordan Carrillo (on loan from Santos)
21	FW	SRB	Uroš Milovanović
22	DF	ESP	Pol Valentín
23	FW	MNE	Uroš Đurđević
24	DF	ARG	Carlos Izquierdoz

=== Reserve team ===
Note: Flags indicate national team as defined under FIFA eligibility rules; some limited exceptions apply. Players may hold more than one non-FIFA nationality.

No.	Pos.	Nation	Player
26	GK	FRA	Florentin Bloch
27	DF	ESP	David Argüelles
29	DF	ESP	Jordi Pola
30	FW	ESP	Dani Queipo
31	FW	ESP	Álex Oyón

No.	Pos.	Nation	Player
32	DF	ESP	Diego Sánchez
33	MF	ESP	Nacho Martín
34	MF	ESP	Lucas Suárez
35	DF	ESP	Juan Aspra
36	MF	ESP	Marcos Trabanco

=== Out on loan ===
Note: Flags indicate national team as defined under FIFA eligibility rules; some limited exceptions apply. Players may hold more than one non-FIFA nationality.

No.	Pos.	Nation	Player
—	GK	ESP	Joel Jiménez (at Real Unión until 30 June 2023)
—	GK	CUB	Christian Joel (at Celta B until 30 June 2023)
—	DF	ESP	Pablo García (at Alcorcón until 30 June 2023)

No.	Pos.	Nation	Player
—	DF	ESP	Enol Coto (at Racing Ferrol until 30 June 2023)
—	MF	ESP	Fran Villalba (at Málaga until 30 June 2023)
—	MF	ESP	Gaspar Campos (at Burgos until 30 June 2023)

== Transfers ==
=== In ===
Date	Player	From	Type	Fee	Ref
1 July 2022	(Spain) Fran Villalba	(England) Birmingham City	Buyout clause	Undisclosed	
4 July 2022	(Spain) Pablo Insua	Huesca	Transfer	Free	
28 July 2022	(Spain) Jony Rodríguez	(Italy) Lazio	Loan		
31 July 2022	(Spain) Cote	Osasuna	Transfer	Free	
30 August 2022	(Ivory Coast) Axel Bamba	(France) Paris	Transfer	Undisclosed	

=== Out ===
Date	Player	To	Type	Fee	Ref
1 July 2022	(Spain) Borja López	(Belgium) Zulte Waregem	Transfer	Free	
8 July 2022	(Ukraine) Bohdan Milovanov	(Portugal) Arouca	Transfer	Undisclosed	
18 August 2022	(Spain) Gaspar Campos	Burgos	Loan		

== Pre-season and friendlies ==
Win Draw Loss

20 July 2022 Friendly	Racing Santander	0–1	Sporting Gijón
CEST (UTC+2)

23 July 2022 Friendly	Cartagena	0–3	Sporting Gijón
CEST (UTC+2)

27 July 2022 Friendly	Mallorca	1–0	Sporting Gijón
CEST (UTC+2)

30 July 2022 Friendly	Sporting Gijón	1–1	Ponferradina
CEST (UTC+2)

3 August 2022 Friendly	Alavés	1–1 (9–8 p)	Sporting Gijón
CEST (UTC+2)

6 August 2022 Friendly	Marino de Luanco	0–1	Sporting Gijón
CEST (UTC+2)

6 August 2022 Friendly	Real Avilés	0–1	Sporting Gijón
CEST (UTC+2)

== Competitions ==
=== Overall record ===
Competition	First match	Last match	Starting round	Final position	Record							
Competition	First match	Last match	Starting round	Final position	Pld	W	D	L	GF	GA	GD	Win %
Segunda División	13 August 2022	28 May 2023	Matchday 1	17th	42	11	17	14	43	48	−5	26.19
Copa del Rey	12 November 2022	18 January 2023	First round	Round of 16	4	3	0	1	7	6	+1	75.00
Total					46	14	17	15	50	54	−4	30.43

Source: Soccerway

=== Segunda División ===
==== League table ====
Pos	Team	Pld	W	D	L	GF	GA	GD	Pts	Qualification or relegation
15	Huesca	42	11	19	12	36	36	0	52 (Note: Huesca finished ahead of Mirandés on head-to-head points: Mirandés 1–1 Huesca, Huesca 1–0 Mirandés.)	
16	Mirandés	42	13	13	16	48	54	−6	52	
17	Sporting Gijón	42	11	17	14	43	48	−5	50 (Note: Overall goal difference: Sporting Gijón −5, Villarreal B −6.)	
18	Villarreal B	42	13	11	18	49	55	−6	50	Not eligible for promotion
19	Ponferradina (R)	42	9	17	16	40	53	−13	44 (Note: Ponferradina finished ahead of Málaga on head-to-head goal difference: Málaga 1–0 Ponferradina, Ponferradina 2–0 Málaga.)	Relegation to Primera Federación

Source: LaLiga SmartBank
Rules for classification: 1) points; 2) head-to-head points; 3) head-to-head goal difference; 4) goal difference; 5) number of goals scored
(R) Relegated
Notes:

Notes

1. Reserve teams are not eligible for promotion to the same league as the first team.

==== Results summary ====
Overall								Home						Away					
Pld	W	D	L	GF	GA	GD	Pts	W	D	L	GF	GA	GD	W	D	L	GF	GA	GD
42	11	17	14	43	48	−5	50	8	9	4	28	22	+6	3	8	10	15	26	−11

Source: LaLiga SmartBank

==== Results by round ====
Round	1	2	3	4	5	6	7	8	9	10	11	12	13	14	15	16	17	18	19	20	21	22	23	24	25	26	27	28	29	30	31	32	33	34	35	36	37	38	39	40	41	42
Ground	A	H	H	A	H	A	H	A	H	A	H	A	A	H	A	H	A	H	A	H	A	H	A	H	H	A	H	A	H	A	H	A	A	H	A	H	A	H	A	H	A	H
Result	D	W	D	W	L	L	W	D	W	L	W	D	L	D	D	D	D	L	W	D	L	D	L	W	D	L	D	L	W	L	L	D	D	W	W	D	L	W	L	D	D	L
Position	9	5	9	4	9	12	6	8	4	9	7	9	10	11	11	11	12	13	11	11	13	12	15	11	12	16	14	15	13	15	17	18	18	14	12	17	17	15	17	18	17	17

Source: LaLiga SmartBank
A = Away; H = Home; W = Win; D = Draw; L = Loss

==== Matches ====
The league fixtures were announced on 23 June 2022.

13 August 2022 1	Mirandés	1–1	Sporting Gijón	Miranda de Ebro
19:00 CEST (UTC+2)				Stadium: Estadio Municipal de Anduva

20 August 2022 2	Sporting Gijón	4–1	Andorra	Gijón
17:30 CEST (UTC+2)				Stadium: El Molinón

27 August 2022 3	Sporting Gijón	0–0	Burgos	Gijón
17:30 CEST (UTC+2)				Stadium: El Molinón

3 September 2022 4	Ponferradina	0–2	Sporting Gijón	Ponferrada
18:30 CEST (UTC+2)				Stadium: El Toralín

11 September 2022 5	Sporting Gijón	0–2	Racing Santander	Gijón
14:00 CEST (UTC+2)				Stadium: El Molinón

17 September 2022 6	Zaragoza	1–0	Sporting Gijón	Zaragoza
21:00 CEST (UTC+2)				Stadium: La Romareda

23 September 2022 7	Sporting Gijón	2–1	Ibiza	Gijón
21:00 CEST (UTC+2)				Stadium: El Molinón

30 September 2022 8	Tenerife	1–1	Sporting Gijón	Santa Cruz de Tenerife

7 October 2022 9	Sporting Gijón	3–1	Villarreal B	Gijón
				Stadium: El Molinón

13 October 2022 10	Granada	5–0	Sporting Gijón	Granada

17 October 2022 11	Sporting Gijón	2–0	Eibar	Gijón
				Stadium: El Molinón

22 October 2022 12	Alavés	0–0	Sporting Gijón	Vitoria-Gasteiz

31 October 2022 13	Levante	1–0	Sporting Gijón	Levante

3 November 2022 14	Sporting Gijón	2–2	Albacete	Gijón
				Stadium: El Molinón

6 November 2022 15	Málaga	1–1	Sporting Gijón	Málaga

19 November 2022 16	Sporting Gijón	2–2	Leganés	Gijón
				Stadium: El Molinón

25 November 2022 17	Huesca	0–0	Sporting Gijón	Huesca

3 December 2022 18	Sporting Gijón	0–1	Las Palmas	Gijón
				Stadium: El Molinón

8 December 2022 19	Lugo	0–1	Sporting Gijón	Lugo

11 December 2022 20	Sporting Gijón	0–0	Cartagena	Gijón
				Stadium: El Molinón

17 December 2022 21	Oviedo	1–0	Sporting Gijón	Oviedo

6 January 2023 22	Sporting Gijón	1–1	Levante	Gijón
				Stadium: El Molinón

14 January 2023 23	Racing Santander	2–0	Sporting Gijón	Santander

22 January 2023 24	Sporting Gijón	1–0	Zaragoza	Gijón
				Stadium: El Molinón

29 January 2023 25	Sporting Gijón	0–0	Málaga	Gijón
				Stadium: El Molinón

4 February 2023 26	Leganés	1–0	Sporting Gijón	Leganés

12 February 2023 27	Sporting Gijón	1–1	Huesca	Gijón
				Stadium: El Molinón

19 February 2023 28	Andorra	1–0	Sporting Gijón	Andorra

25 February 2023 29	Sporting Gijón	1–0	Tenerife	Gijón
				Stadium: El Molinón

5 March 2023 30	Albacete	2–1	Sporting Gijón	Albacete

12 March 2023 31	Sporting Gijón	3–4	Mirandés	Gijón
				Stadium: El Molinón

19 March 2023 32	Burgos	0–0	Sporting Gijón	Burgos

26 March 2023 33	Las Palmas	1–1	Sporting Gijón	Las Palmas

2 April 2023 34	Sporting Gijón	1–0	Granada	Gijón
				Stadium: El Molinón

8 April 2023 35	Ibiza	1–3	Sporting Gijón	Ibiza

16 April 2023 36	Sporting Gijón	0–0	Alavés	Gijón
				Stadium: El Molinón

22 April 2023 37	Cartagena	2–1	Sporting Gijón	Cartagena

1 May 2023 38	Sporting Gijón	3–1	Lugo	Gijón
				Stadium: El Molinón

7 May 2023 39	Villarreal B	2–0	Sporting Gijón	Villarreal

13 May 2023 40	Sporting Gijón	1–1	Oviedo	Gijón
				Stadium: El Molinón

20 May 2023 41	Eibar	2–2	Sporting Gijón	Eibar

28 May 2023 42	Sporting Gijón	1–4	Ponferradina	Gijón
				Stadium: El Molinón

=== Copa del Rey ===
12 November 2022 First round	Beasain	2–3 (a.e.t.)	Sporting Gijón	Beasain
18:00	Sanz 25'; Pita 56'	Report	Đurđević 8'; Rivera 75'; C. González 120'	Stadium: Loinaz; Referee: Raúl Martín González Francés

21 December 2022 Second round	Numancia	0–3	Sporting Gijón	Soria
19:00		Report	Milovanović 7', 9'; García 90+3'	Stadium: Los Pajaritos; Referee: Adrián Cordero Vega

3 January 2023 Round of 32	Sporting Gijón	2–0	Rayo Vallecano	Gijón
21:00	Milovanović 57', 88'	Report		Stadium: El Molinón-Enrique Castro "Quini"; Attendance: 17,423; Referee: Juan Luis Pulido Santana

18 January 2023 Round of 16	Sporting Gijón	0–4	Valencia	Gijón
19:00		Report	Cavani 10', 39'; Kluivert 21'; Lino 64'	Stadium: El Molinón-Enrique Castro "Quini"; Attendance: 14,625; Referee: José Luis Munuera Montero
