= 2020–21 Sporting de Gijón season =

Sporting de Gijón
2020–21 season
- President: Javier Fernández
- Head coach: David Gallego
- Stadium: El Molinón
- Segunda División: 7th
- Copa del Rey: Round of 32
- Top goalscorer: League: Uroš Đurđević (22); All: Uroš Đurđević (22)
Home colours	Away colours	Third colours

The 2020–21 Sporting de Gijón season was the club's 115th season in existence and the club's fourth consecutive season in the second division of Spanish football. In addition to the domestic league, Sporting Gijón participated in this season's edition of the Copa del Rey. The season covered the period from 21 July 2020 to 30 June 2021.

== Players ==
=== First-team squad ===
As of 1 February 2021.

Note: Flags indicate national team as defined under FIFA eligibility rules; some limited exceptions apply. Players may hold more than one non-FIFA nationality.

No.	Pos.	Nation	Player
2	DF	ESP	Guille Rosas
3	DF	ESP	Saúl García (on loan from Alavés)
4	DF	ESP	Marc Valiente
5	DF	ESP	Borja López
6	DF	MTQ	Jean-Sylvain Babin
7	FW	ESP	Aitor García
8	MF	ESP	Pedro Díaz
10	MF	ESP	Carlos Carmona (Captain)
11	FW	ESP	Víctor Campuzano
13	GK	ESP	Diego Mariño (Vice-captain)
14	MF	ESP	Nacho Méndez
16	MF	ESP	José Gragera

No.	Pos.	Nation	Player
17	FW	SRB	Nikola Čumić (on loan from Olympiacos)
18	MF	ESP	Javi Fuego
19	MF	ESP	Manu García
20	MF	ESP	Cristian Salvador
22	FW	ESP	Pablo Pérez (3rd captain)
23	FW	MNE	Uroš Đurđević
26	DF	ESP	Pablo García
27	MF	ESP	Gaspar Campos
30	GK	CUB	Christian Joel
32	DF	UKR	Bogdan Milovanov
34	DF	ESP	Pelayo Suárez

=== Reserve team ===
Note: Flags indicate national team as defined under FIFA eligibility rules; some limited exceptions apply. Players may hold more than one non-FIFA nationality.

No.	Pos.	Nation	Player
28	MF	ESP	Berto González
29	MF	ESP	Mateo Arellano
31	MF	ESP	Pelayo Morilla
33	GK	ESP	Joel Jiménez
35	FW	ESP	César García
36	DF	ESP	Álex Zalaya

No.	Pos.	Nation	Player
38	DF	ESP	David Argüelles
39	MF	ESP	Marcos Trabanco
40	GK	ESP	Pablo Díez
41	GK	ESP	Gonzalo Ardura
43	MF	ESP	Javier Mecerreyes

=== Out on loan ===
Note: Flags indicate national team as defined under FIFA eligibility rules; some limited exceptions apply. Players may hold more than one non-FIFA nationality.

No.	Pos.	Nation	Player
—	MF	ESP	Hernán Santana (to Mumbai City FC until 31 May 2021)
—	FW	ESP	Álvaro Vázquez (to Sabadell until 30 June 2021)

No.	Pos.	Nation	Player
—	FW	SUI	Neftali Manzambi (to Mjällby until 30 June 2021)

== Transfers ==
=== In ===
No.	Pos.	Nat.	Name	Age	Moving from	Type	Transfer window	Ends	Transfer fee	Source
	FW	(Spain)	Isma Cerro	25	Badajoz	End of loan	Summer		Free	
11	FW	(Switzerland)	Neftali Manzambi	23	Valencia Mestalla	End of loan	Summer		Free	
16	MF	(Spain)	José Gragera	19	Real Sporting B	Promoted	Summer	2024	Free	
17	FW	(Serbia)	Nikola Čumić	21	(Greece) Olympiacos (Note: Previously loaned to Radnički Niš.)	Loan	Summer	2021	Free	
3	DF	(Spain)	Saúl García	25	Alavés (Note: Previously loaned to Rayo Vallecano.)	Loan	Summer	2021	Free	

=== Out ===
No.	Pos.	Nat.	Name	Age	Moving to	Type	Transfer window	Transfer fee	Source
2	DF	(Argentina)	Damián Pérez	31		End of contract	Summer	Free	
11	MF	(Brazil)	Murilo	25	(Portugal) Braga	End of loan	Summer	Free	
15	DF	(Spain)	Francisco Molinero	34		End of contract	Summer	Free	
3	DF	(Spain)	Carlos Cordero	23	Marbella	Mutual consent	Summer	Free	
17	DF	(Spain)	Unai Medina	30	UD Logroñés	Mutual consent	Summer	Free	
	FW	(Spain)	Isma Cerro	25	Andorra	Mutual consent	Summer	Free	
21	MF	(Spain)	Álvaro Traver	27		Mutual consent	Summer	Free	
24	MF	(Spain)	Hernán Santana	30	(India) Mumbai City	Mutual consent	Summer	Free	

== Pre-season and friendlies ==
Win Draw Loss Fixtures

23 August 2020 Friendly	Sporting Gijón	2–2	Sporting Gijón B	Gijón
12:00 CEST (UTC+2)	Carmona 27'; Álvaro Vázquez 41' (pen.)	Report	Gragera 12'; Pedro Díaz 54'	Stadium: Pepe Ortiz

28 August 2020 Friendly	Sporting Gijón	1–0	Ponferradina	Gijón
18:30 CEST (UTC+2)	Aitor García 79'	Report		Stadium: Pepe Ortiz; Referee: Francisco García Riesgo

30 August 2020 Friendly	Sporting Gijón	1–2	Lugo	Gijón
12:00 CEST (UTC+2)	Đurđević 21' (pen.)	Report	Iriome 53'; Herrera 83' (pen.)	Stadium: El Molinón; Attendance: 0 Referee: Enrique Gao Aladro

3 September 2020 Friendly	Sporting Gijón	0–0	UD Logroñés	Gijón
18:30 CEST (UTC+2)				Stadium: Pepe Ortiz

5 September 2020 Friendly	Celta Vigo	1–1	Sporting Gijón	Vigo
18:30 CEST (UTC+2)	Aspas 19'		Álvaro Vázquez 2'	Stadium: Balaídos

== Competitions ==
=== Overview ===
Competition	First match	Last match	Starting round	Final position	Record							
Competition	First match	Last match	Starting round	Final position	Pld	W	D	L	GF	GA	GD	Win %
Segunda División	13 September 2020	30 May 2021	Matchday 1	7th	42	17	14	11	37	28	+9	40.48
Copa del Rey	16 December 2020	17 January 2021	First round	Round of 32	3	2	0	1	3	3	+0	66.67
Total					45	19	14	12	40	31	+9	42.22

Last updated: 30 May 2021
Source: Soccerway

=== Segunda División ===
==== League table ====
Pos	Team	Pld	W	D	L	GF	GA	GD	Pts	Promotion, qualification or relegation
5	Girona	42	20	11	11	47	36	+11	71	Qualification for promotion play-offs
6	Rayo Vallecano (O, P)	42	19	10	13	52	40	+12	67	Qualification for promotion play-offs
7	Sporting Gijón	42	17	14	11	37	28	+9	65	
8	Ponferradina	42	15	12	15	45	50	−5	57	
9	Las Palmas	42	14	14	14	46	53	−7	56	

Source: LaLiga
Rules for classification: 1) points; 2) head-to-head points; 3) head-to-head goal difference; 4) goal difference; 5) number of goals scored
(O) Play-off winners; (P) Promoted

==== Results summary ====
Overall								Home						Away					
Pld	W	D	L	GF	GA	GD	Pts	W	D	L	GF	GA	GD	W	D	L	GF	GA	GD
42	17	14	11	37	28	+9	65	11	6	3	21	11	+10	6	8	8	16	17	−1

Last updated: 30 May 2021.
Source: La Liga

==== Results by round ====
Round	1	2	3	4	5	6	7	8	9	10	11	12	13	14	15	16	17	18	19	20	21	22	23	24	25	26	27	28	29	30	31	32	33	34	35	36	37	38	39	40	41	42
Ground	H	A	H	A	A	H	A	H	A	H	A	H	A	H	A	H	A	H	H	A	H	A	H	A	H	A	H	A	H	A	H	A	H	A	H	A	A	H	A	H	A	H
Result	W	W	W	W	L	D	L	W	W	W	L	D	D	W	L	D	L	W	D	D	W	L	D	W	W	W	D	D	W	D	D	W	L	L	L	D	D	W	L	W	D	L
Position	7	2	1	1	2	2	4	2	2	2	3	3	4	4	5	5	5	5	5	6	5	5	6	4	5	5	5	5	5	5	5	4	5	5	5	5	5	5	6	6	7	7

Updated to match(es) played on 30 May 2021. Source: La Liga
A = Away; H = Home; W = Win; D = Draw; L = Loss

==== Matches ====
The league fixtures were announced on 31 August 2020.

12 September 2020 1	Sporting Gijón	1–0	UD Logroñés	Gijón
18:15 CEST (UTC+2)	Đurđević 89'; Bogdan (yellow card) 90+1'	Report	Errasti (yellow card) 62'	Stadium: El Molinón; Attendance: 0 (Note: The match was played behind closed doors due to the COVID-19 pandemic in Spain.); Referee: Gorostegui Fernández-Ortega

20 September 2020 2	Cartagena	0–1	Sporting Gijón	Cartagena
18:15 CEST (UTC+2)	Carrasquilla (yellow card) 55'; Andújar (yellow card) 84' (yellow-red card) 90'	Report	Gragera 72'; Carmona (yellow card) 78'	Stadium: Cartagonova; Attendance: 0 Referee: Ortiz Arias

26 September 2020 3	Sporting Gijón	2–0	Girona	Gijón
18:15 CEST (UTC+2)	Borja López (yellow card) 12'; Gaspar (red card) 15'; Đurđević (yellow card) 37' (goal) 49', 59'	Report	Juanpe (yellow card) 41'; Franquesa (red card) 45+3'; Ibrahima Kebe (yellow card) 82'	Stadium: El Molinón; Attendance: 0 Referee: Muñiz Ruiz

4 October 2020 4	Almería	0–1	Sporting Gijón	Almería
18:15 CEST (UTC+2)		Report	Pablo García (yellow card) 39'; Pedro Díaz (yellow card) 49'; Borja López (yellow card) 56'; Čumić (yellow card) 67'; Đurđević 74'; Manu García (yellow card) 76'; Bogdan (yellow card) 81'	Stadium: Juegos Mediterráneos; Attendance: 0 Referee: Ávalos Barrera

11 October 2020 5	Oviedo	1–0	Sporting Gijón	Oviedo
21:30 CEST (UTC+2)	Tejera 38' (pen.); Fernández (yellow card) 87'; Mújica (yellow card) 90+3'; Femenías (yellow card) 90+5'	Report	Babin (yellow card) 28'; Manu García (yellow card) 66'	Stadium: Carlos Tartiere; Attendance: 0 Referee: Luis Mario Milla Alvéndiz

18 October 2020 6	Sporting Gijón	1–1	Tenerife	Gijón
21:00 CEST (UTC+2)	Díaz 65'; García (yellow card) 74'	Report	Moore (yellow card) 29'; Zarfino (yellow card) 52', (goal) 85'; González (yellow card) 88'	Stadium: El Molinón; Attendance: 0 Referee: Dámaso Arcediano Monescillo

22 October 2020 7	Málaga	1–0	Sporting Gijón	Málaga
21:30 CEST (UTC+2)	Juande 21'; Lombán (yellow card) 90+5'	Report	Čumić (yellow card) 18'; Đurđević (yellow card) 90+7'	Stadium: La Rosaleda; Attendance: 0 Referee: Eduardo Prieto Iglesias

25 October 2020 8	Sporting Gijón	2–1	Ponferradina	Gijón
16:00 CEST (UTC+2)	Rosas (yellow card) 26'; Manu García 67'; Vázquez 87'; Díaz (yellow card) 89'	Report	Hamani (yellow card) 13'; Kaxe 18'; Morán (yellow card) 37'; Valcarce (yellow card) 90+4'	Stadium: El Molinón; Attendance: 0 Referee: José Antonio López Toca

29 October 2020 9	Alcorcón	1–2	Sporting Gijón	Alcorcón
16:30 CET (UTC+1)	Sosa 75'; Óscar (yellow card) 85'	Report	Čumić (yellow card) 38'; Đurđević 64'; García 79'	Stadium: Estadio Municipal de Santo Domingo; Attendance: 0 Referee: Alejandro Muñíz Ruiz

2 November 2020 10	Sporting Gijón	1–0	Castellón	Gijón
18:15 CET (UTC+1)	Saúl García (yellow card) 33'; Đurđević 40'	Report	Lapeña (yellow card) 68'; Molina (yellow card) 79' (yellow-red card) 90+2'; Señé (yellow card) 85'	Stadium: El Molinón; Attendance: 0 Referee: Iosu Galech Apezteguia

7 November 2020 11	Mirandés	1–0	Sporting Gijón	Miranda de Ebro
18:15 CET (UTC+1)	Moreno 13'; Vivian (yellow card) 45+1'; Gómez (yellow card) 90+4'	Report	Vázquez (yellow card) 82'; López (yellow card) 90+1'	Stadium: Estadio Municipal de Anduva; Attendance: 0 Referee: Rubén Ávalos Barrera

16 November 2020 12	Sporting Gijón	1–1	Rayo Vallecano	Gijón
21:00 CET (UTC+1)	Carmona (red card) 67'; F. García 77' (o.g.); Fuego (yellow card) 90+6'	Report	Hernández (yellow card) 54'; Velázquez (yellow card) 56'; Martín 87'; Qasmi (yellow card) 90+3'	Stadium: El Molinón; Attendance: 0 Referee: Saúl Ais Reig

22 November 2020 13	Mallorca	0–0	Sporting Gijón	Palma de Mallorca
16:00 CET (UTC+1)	Sevilla (yellow card) 53'	Report		Stadium: Visit Mallorca Stadium; Attendance: 0 Referee: David Gálvez Rascón

25 November 2020 14	Sporting Gijón	3–1	Sabadell	Gijón
19:00 CET (UTC+1)	García 8'; Campos 73', 84'	Report	Romero (yellow card) 30'; Sánchez (yellow card) 33'; Undabarrena (yellow card) 63'; Hernández 70'; Grego (red card) 88'	Stadium: El Molinón; Attendance: 0 Referee: Francisco José Hernández Maeso

29 November 2020 15	Las Palmas	3–2	Sporting Gijón	Las Palmas
21:00 CET (UTC+1)	Rober 54', 56'; Curbelo (yellow card) 72'; Espiau 84'	Report	Fuego (yellow card) 16'; Đurđević 24' (pen.), 35', (yellow card) 67'; López (yellow card) 38'	Stadium: Estadio Gran Canaria; Attendance: 0 Referee: Javier Iglesias Villanueva

3 December 2020 16	Sporting Gijón	0–0	Albacete	Gijón
21:30 CET (UTC+1)		Report	Kecojević (yellow card) 7'; Boyomo (yellow card) 68'; Sepp Mvondo (yellow card) 72'; Gorosito (yellow card) 87'	Stadium: El Molinón; Attendance: 0 Referee: Rubén Ávalos Barrera

6 December 2020 17	Espanyol	2–0	Sporting Gijón	Cornellà de Llobregat
16:00 CET (UTC+1)	Da. López (yellow card) 68'; Embarba (yellow card) 76'; Wu Lei 88'; Darder 90+7'	Report	Campos (yellow card) 10'; S. García (yellow card) 39'; Rosas (yellow card) 90+1'; Pérez (yellow card) 90+5'; A. García (yellow card) 90+8'	Stadium: RCDE Stadium; Attendance: 0 Referee: Gorka Sagués Oscoz

13 December 2020 18	Sporting Gijón	1–0	Zaragoza	Gijón
21:00 CET (UTC+1)	Đurđević 77'	Report	Atienza (red card) 67'; Eguaras (yellow card) 81'; Zapater (yellow card) 90+2'	Stadium: El Molinón; Attendance: 0 Referee: Eduardo Prieto Iglesias

21 December 2020 19	Sporting Gijón	1–1	Leganés	Gijón
21:00 CET (UTC+1)	Đurđević (yellow card) 43', (goal) 86'; Valiente (yellow card) 90+4'	Report	Omeruo (yellow card) 81'; Cuéllar (yellow card) 85'; Bastón 90+6' (pen.)	Stadium: El Molinón; Attendance: 0 Referee: Juan Luis Pulido Santana

4 January 2021 20	Lugo	0–0	Sporting Gijón	Lugo
21:00 CET (UTC+1)		Report		Stadium: Anxo Carro; Attendance: 0 Referee: Dámaso Arcediano Monescillo

11 January 2021 21	Sporting Gijón	2–1	Fuenlabrada	Gijón
20:30 CET (UTC+1)	Đurđević 25', 53'	Report	Mula 55'	Stadium: El Molinón; Attendance: 0 Referee: Rafael Sánchez López

24 January 2021 22	Castellón	2–0	Sporting Gijón	Castellón de la Plana
18:15 CET (UTC+1)	Cubillas 20'; Ledes 53'	Report		Stadium: Nou Estadi Castàlia; Attendance: 0 Referee: Álvaro Moreno Aragón

31 January 2021 23	Sporting Gijón	0–0	Cartagena	Gijón
14:00 CET (UTC+1)		Report		Stadium: El Molinón; Attendance: 0 Referee: José Antonio López Toca

6 February 2021 24	UD Logroñés	0–4	Sporting Gijón	Logroño
18:15 CET (UTC+1)		Report	Đurđević 14', 45', 74'; Čumić 82'	Stadium: Las Gaunas; Attendance: 0 Referee: Rubén Ávalos Barrera

14 February 2021 25	Sporting Gijón	1–0	Málaga	Gijón
21:00 CET (UTC+1)	Đurđević 48'	Report		Stadium: El Molinón; Attendance: 0 Referee: Óliver de la Fuente Ramos

20 February 2021 26	Albacete	0–1	Sporting Gijón	Albacete
18:15 CET (UTC+1)	Boyomo (red card) 49'; Israfilov (yellow card) 61'; Fran García (yellow card) 77'; Teguia (yellow card) 90'	Report	Babin 31'; Gragera (yellow card) 64'	Stadium: Carlos Belmonte; Attendance: 0 Referee: Juan Luis Pulido Santana

28 February 2021 27	Sporting Gijón	1–1	Espanyol	Gijón
16:00 CET (UTC+1)	Fuego (yellow card) 8'; Đurđević (yellow card) 9', (goal) 23'; García (yellow card) 67'; Rosas (yellow card) 70'	Report	Embarba 12'; Cabrera (yellow card) 30'; Pedrosa (yellow card) 49'	Stadium: El Molinón; Attendance: 0 Referee: Luis Mario Milla Alvendiz

7 March 2021 28	Ponferradina	2–2	Sporting Gijón	Ponferrada
16:00 CET (UTC+1)	Sánchez 52'; Valcarce 54'	Report	Díaz 39' (pen.); Pérez 47'	Stadium: El Toralín; Attendance: 0 Referee: Francisco José Hernández Maeso

14 March 2021 29	Sporting Gijón	2–0	Mallorca	Gijón
16:00 CET (UTC+1)	Đurđević 28' (pen.), 86'; Pérez (yellow card) 90+2'; Babin (yellow card) 90+4'	Report	Sánchez (yellow card) 27'; Cufré (yellow card) 90+2'	Stadium: El Molinón; Attendance: 0 Referee: Alejandro Muñiz Ruiz

20 March 2021 30	Sabadell	1–1	Sporting Gijón	Sabadell
16:00 CET (UTC+1)	Stoichkov 23' (pen.)	Report	Đurđević 54'	Stadium: Estadi de la Nova Creu Alta; Attendance: 0 Referee: Javier Iglesias Villanueva

26 March 2021 31	Sporting Gijón	0–0	Alcorcón	Gijón
19:00 CET (UTC+1)		Report		Stadium: El Molinón; Attendance: 0 Referee: Saúl Ais Reig

30 March 2021 32	Rayo Vallecano	0–1	Sporting Gijón	Madrid
21:30 CEST (UTC+2)	Trejo (yellow card) 23'; Catena (yellow card) 68'	Report	Díaz 15'	Stadium: Vallecas; Attendance: 0 Referee: Daniel Jesús Trujillo Suárez

4 April 2021 33	Sporting Gijón	1–2	Mirandés	Gijón
14:00 CEST (UTC+2)	Đurđević 54' (pen.)	Report	Moha 74'; Martín 81'	Stadium: El Molinón; Attendance: 0 Referee: Aitor Gorostegui Fernández-Ortega

9 April 2021 34	Tenerife	1–0	Sporting Gijón	Santa Cruz de Tenerife
21:00 CEST (UTC+2)	Sol 66'	Report		Stadium: Heliodoro Rodríguez López; Attendance: 0 Referee: Iosu Galech Apezteguía

17 April 2021 35	Sporting Gijón	0–1	Oviedo	Gijón
18:15 CEST (UTC+2)	Babin (yellow card) 79'	Report	Johannesson 6'; Arribas (yellow card) 9'; Ahijado (yellow card) 52'	Stadium: El Molinón; Attendance: 0 Referee: Miguel Ángel Ortiz Arias

23 April 2021 36	Zaragoza	0–0	Sporting Gijón	Zaragoza
21:00 CEST (UTC+2)	Nieto (yellow card) 42'; Eguaras (yellow card) 90'	Report	Rosas (yellow card) 30'; García (yellow card) 64'	Stadium: La Romareda; Attendance: 0 Referee: Eduardo Prieto Iglesias

2 May 2021 37	Leganés	0–0	Sporting Gijón	Leganés
18:15 CEST (UTC+2)	Silva (yellow card) 34'; Eraso (yellow card) 37'; Palencia (yellow card) 51'	Report	Babin (yellow card) 80'; Díaz (yellow card) 87'; Salvador (yellow card) 90'	Stadium: Estadio Municipal de Butarque; Attendance: 0 Referee: Luis Mario Milla Alvendiz

10 May 2021 38	Sporting Gijón	1–0	Lugo	Gijón
21:00 CEST (UTC+2)	Gragera (yellow card) 26'; Campos 53'; Đurđević (yellow card) 71'; Saúl (yellow card) 74'	Report	Seoane (yellow card) 67'	Stadium: El Molinón; Attendance: 0 Referee: Gorka Sagués Oscoz

17 May 2021 39	Girona	1–0	Sporting Gijón	Girona
21:00 CEST (UTC+2)	Juanpe 43'	Report	Gragera (yellow card) 28'; Fuego (yellow card) 37'; Mariño (yellow card) 45'	Stadium: Montilivi; Attendance: 0 Referee: Alejandro Muñiz Ruiz

20 May 2021 40	Sporting Gijón	1–0	Las Palmas	Gijón
19:00 CEST (UTC+2)	Đurđević 64'; Rosas (yellow card) 68'	Report	Cardona (yellow card) 26'	Stadium: El Molinón; Attendance: 0 Referee: Francisco José Hernández Maeso

24 May 2021 41	Fuenlabrada	0–0	Sporting Gijón	Fuenlabrada
21:00 CEST (UTC+2)	Salvador (yellow card) 28'; Diéguez (yellow card) 90+2'	Report	A. García (yellow card) 44'; M. García (yellow card) 71'	Stadium: Fernando Torres; Attendance: 0 Referee: Jon Ander González Esteban

30 May 2021 42	Sporting Gijón	0–2	Almería	Gijón
21:00 CEST (UTC+2)		Report	Aketxe 56', 71'	Stadium: El Molinón; Attendance: 0 Referee: Eduardo Prieto Iglesias

=== Copa del Rey ===
16 December 2020 First round	Quintanar del Rey	1–2	Sporting Gijón	Albacete (Note: Quintanar del Rey did not play its game in its main stadium San Marcos, in Quintanar del Rey, for avoiding to play behind closed doors due to the COVID-19 pandemic.)
18:00 CET (UTC+1)	Ricar 47'	Report	Čumić 63'; López 90'	Stadium: Ciudad Deportiva Andrés Iniesta; Referee: Miguel Ángel Ortiz Arias

7 January 2021 Second round	Amorebieta	0–1	Sporting Gijón	Amorebieta
19:00 CET (UTC+1)	Álvaro (yellow card) 90+2'	Report	Salvador 74'; Manzambi (yellow card) 90+3'	Stadium: Urritxe; Referee: Daniel Jesús Trujillo Suárez

17 January 2021 Round of 32	Sporting Gijón	0–2	Real Betis	Gijón
16:00 CET (UTC+1)	Valiente (red card) 21'; Đurđević (yellow card) 31'; López (yellow card) 36'	Report	Canales 28' (pen.); Rodri 31', (yellow card) 52'	Stadium: El Molinón; Referee: Ricardo de Burgos Bengoetxea

== Statistics ==
=== Appearances and goals ===
Last updated 14 March 2020.

No.	Pos	Nat	Player	Total		Segunda División		Copa del Rey	
No.	Pos	Nat	Player	Apps	Goals	Apps	Goals	Apps	Goals
Goalkeepers
13	GK	(Spain) ESP	Diego Mariño	26	0	26	0	0	0
30	GK	(Cuba) CUB	Christian Joel	6	0	3	0	3	0
Defenders
2	DF	(Spain) ESP	Guille Rosas	17	0	16+1	0	0	0
3	DF	(Spain) ESP	Saúl García	28	0	23+2	0	1+2	0
4	DF	(Spain) ESP	Marc Valiente	13	0	7+3	0	3	0
5	DF	(Spain) ESP	Borja López	25	1	22+1	0	1+1	1
6	DF	(Martinique) MTQ	Jean-Sylvain Babin	30	1	28	1	1+1	0
26	DF	(Spain) ESP	Pablo García	17	0	9+6	0	2	0
32	DF	(Ukraine) UKR	Bogdan Milovanov	16	0	12+2	0	2	0
34	DF	(Spain) ESP	Pelayo Suárez	5	0	2+2	0	0+1	0
36	DF	(Spain) ESP	Álex Zalaya	1	0	0	0	1	0
Midfielders
8	MF	(Spain) ESP	Pedro Díaz	26	2	19+6	2	1	0
10	MF	(Spain) ESP	Carlos Carmona	18	0	3+12	0	3	0
14	MF	(Spain) ESP	Nacho Méndez	13	0	5+7	0	0+1	0
16	MF	(Spain) ESP	José Gragera	24	1	19+4	1	0+1	0
18	MF	(Spain) ESP	Javi Fuego	30	0	22+5	0	3	0
19	MF	(Spain) ESP	Manu García	26	1	24+1	1	0+1	0
20	MF	(Spain) ESP	Cristian Salvador	9	1	3+4	0	1+1	1
27	MF	(Spain) ESP	Gaspar Campos	24	2	14+10	2	0	0
29	MF	(Spain) ESP	Mateo Arellano	1	0	0	0	1	0
Forwards
7	FW	(Spain) ESP	Aitor García	31	2	21+7	2	1+2	0
11	FW	(Spain) ESP	Víctor Campuzano	3	0	1+2	0	0	0
17	FW	(Serbia) SRB	Nikola Čumić	23	2	13+7	1	0+3	1
22	FW	(Spain) ESP	Pablo Pérez	18	1	1+15	1	1+1	0
23	FW	(Montenegro) MNE	Uroš Đurđević	30	19	28	19	1+1	0
39	FW	(Spain) ESP	Marcos Trabanco	1	0	0	0	1	0
Players who have made an appearance or had a squad number this season but have left the club
9	FW	(Spain) ESP	Álvaro Vázquez	18	1	1+15	1	2	0
11	FW	(Switzerland) SUI	Neftali Manzambi	3	1	0+1	1	1+1	0

=== Goalscorers ===
As of 14 March 2021

Rank	No.	Pos	Nat	Name	Segunda División	Copa del Rey	Total
1	17	FW	(Montenegro)	Uroš Đurđević	19	0	19
2	7	FW	(Spain)	Aitor García	2	0	2
2	8	FW	(Spain)	Pedro Díaz	2	0	2
2	17	FW	(Serbia)	Nikola Čumić	1	1	2
2	27	MF	(Spain)	Gaspar Campos	2	0	2
3	5	DF	(Spain)	Borja López	0	1	1
3	6	DF	(Martinique)	Jean-Sylvain Babin	1	0	1
3	16	MF	(Spain)	José Gragera	1	0	1
3	19	MF	(Spain)	Manu García	1	0	1
3	20	MF	(Spain)	Cristian Salvador	0	1	1
3	22	FW	(Spain)	Pablo Pérez	1	0	1
Totals					32	3	35
