= 2021–22 Sporting de Gijón season =

Sporting de Gijón
2021–22 season
- President: Javier Fernández
- Head coach: José Luis Martí (until 3 May); Abelardo (from 3 May)
- Stadium: El Molinón
- Segunda División: 17th
- Copa del Rey: Round of 16
- Top goalscorer: League: Uroš Đurđević (14); All: Uroš Đurđević (16)
Home colours	Away colours

The 2021–22 season was the 117th season in the existence of Sporting de Gijón and the club's fifth consecutive season in the second division of Spanish football. In addition to the domestic league, Sporting Gijón participated in this season's edition of the Copa del Rey.

== Players ==
=== First-team squad ===
As of 8 February 2022.

Note: Flags indicate national team as defined under FIFA eligibility rules; some limited exceptions apply. Players may hold more than one non-FIFA nationality.

No.	Pos.	Nation	Player
1	GK	ESP	Iván Cuéllar
2	DF	ESP	Guille Rosas
3	DF	UKR	Vasyl Kravets (on loan from Leganés)
4	DF	ESP	Marc Valiente
5	DF	ESP	Borja López
6	DF	MTQ	Jean-Sylvain Babin
7	FW	ESP	Aitor García
8	MF	ESP	Pedro Díaz
10	MF	ESP	Nacho Méndez
11	FW	ESP	Víctor Campuzano
13	GK	ESP	Diego Mariño (captain)
14	FW	ESP	Berto González

No.	Pos.	Nation	Player
15	DF	ESP	Juan Berrocal (on loan from Sevilla)
16	MF	ESP	José Gragera
17	MF	ESP	Christian Rivera
18	MF	PAN	José Luis Rodríguez (on loan from Alavés)
19	DF	UKR	Bogdan Milovanov
21	MF	ESP	Fran Villalba (on loan from Birmingham)
22	FW	ESP	Pablo Pérez
23	FW	MNE	Uroš Đurđević
26	DF	ESP	Pablo García
27	MF	ESP	Gaspar Campos
33	GK	ESP	Joel Jiménez

=== Reserve team ===
Note: Flags indicate national team as defined under FIFA eligibility rules; some limited exceptions apply. Players may hold more than one non-FIFA nationality.

No.	Pos.	Nation	Player
35	FW	ESP	César García
38	DF	ESP	David Argüelles
39	MF	ESP	Marcos Trabanco

No.	Pos.	Nation	Player
41	GK	ESP	Gonzalo Ardura
43	MF	ESP	Javier Mecerreyes

=== Out on loan ===
Note: Flags indicate national team as defined under FIFA eligibility rules; some limited exceptions apply. Players may hold more than one non-FIFA nationality.

No.	Pos.	Nation	Player
—	GK	CUB	Christian Joel (to AEK Larnaca until 30 June 2022)
—	DF	ESP	Pelayo Suárez (to Logroñés until 30 June 2022)
—	MF	ESP	Manu García (to Alavés until 30 June 2022)

No.	Pos.	Nation	Player
—	MF	ESP	Pelayo Morilla (to Algeciras until 30 June 2022)
—	MF	ESP	Pelayo Suárez (to SD Logroñés until 30 June 2022)

== Pre-season and friendlies ==
Win Draw Loss Fixtures

22 July 2021 Friendly	Sporting Gijón	7–0	Gijón Industrial	Gijón, Spain
19:00 CEST (UTC+2)		Report		Stadium: Escuela de Fútbol de Mareo

25 July 2021 Friendly	Sporting Gijón	2–0	Racing Ferrol	Avilés, Spain
19:00 CEST (UTC+2)		Report		Stadium: Estadio Román Suárez Puerta

28 July 2021 Friendly	Sporting Gijón	0–2	Real Sociedad B	Spain
18:30 CEST (UTC+2)		Report	Martón 7'; Kortajarena 50'	Referee: Álvarez Ordóñez

31 July 2021 Friendly	Sporting Gijón	1–0	Ponferradina	Gijón, Spain
18:30 CEST (UTC+2)		Report		Stadium: Escuela de Fútbol de Mareo

== Competitions ==
=== Overall record ===
Competition	First match	Last match	Starting round	Final position	Record							
Competition	First match	Last match	Starting round	Final position	Pld	W	D	L	GF	GA	GD	Win %
Segunda División	15 August 2021	29 May 2022	Matchday 1	17th	42	11	13	18	43	48	−5	26.19
Copa del Rey	1 December 2021	15 January 2022	First round	Round of 16	4	3	1	0	5	2	+3	75.00
Total					46	14	14	18	48	50	−2	30.43

Source: Soccerway

=== Segunda División ===
==== League table ====
Pos	Team	Pld	W	D	L	GF	GA	GD	Pts	Qualification or relegation
15	Ibiza	42	12	16	14	53	59	−6	52 (Note: Mirandés finished ahead of Ibiza on head-to-head points: Mirandés 4–0 Ibiza, Ibiza 0–2 Mirandés.)	
16	Lugo	42	10	20	12	46	52	−6	50	
17	Sporting Gijón	42	11	13	18	43	48	−5	46	
18	Málaga	42	11	12	19	36	57	−21	45	
19	Amorebieta (R)	42	9	16	17	44	63	−19	43	Relegation to Primera Federación

Source: LaLiga SmartBank
Rules for classification: 1) points; 2) head-to-head points; 3) head-to-head goal difference; 4) goal difference; 5) number of goals scored
(R) Relegated

==== Results summary ====
Overall								Home						Away					
Pld	W	D	L	GF	GA	GD	Pts	W	D	L	GF	GA	GD	W	D	L	GF	GA	GD
42	11	13	18	43	48	−5	46	8	3	10	24	24	0	3	10	8	19	24	−5

Source: La Liga Smartbank

==== Results by round ====
Round	1	2	3	4	5	6	7	8	9	10	11	12	13	14	15	16	17	18	19	20	21	22	23	24	25	26	27	28	29	30	31	32	33	34	35	36	37	38	39	40	41	42
Ground	H	A	H	A	H	A	H	A	A	H	A	H	A	H	A	H	A	H	A	H	A	H	A	H	A	H	A	H	H	A	H	A	H	A	A	H	A	H	A	H	A	H
Result	W	D	W	W	W	L	W	D	D	W	L	L	D	L	L	L	L	D	L	D	W	D	D	W	L	L	W	L	L	L	L	D	W	D	D	L	L	L	D	W	D	L
Position	7	9	3	1	1	2	1	2	2	1	3	3	7	7	8	10	13	13	15	15	12	12	15	12	13	14	13	15	16	17	18	18	17	17	17	17	17	17	17	17	17	17

Source: La Liga SmartBank
A = Away; H = Home; W = Win; D = Draw; L = Loss

==== Matches ====
The league fixtures were announced on 30 June 2021.

15 August 2021 1	Sporting Gijón	1–0	Burgos	Gijón
17:00 CEST (UTC+2)	Đurđević 66'	Report		Stadium: El Molinón; Referee: Gorka Sagués Oscoz

21 August 2021 2	Tenerife	0–0	Sporting Gijón	Santa Cruz de Tenerife
18:30 WEST (UTC+1)		Report		Stadium: Heliodoro Rodríguez López; Attendance: 4,999; Referee: Rubén Ávalos Barrera

28 August 2021 3	Sporting Gijón	2–1	Mirandés	Gijón
17:00 CEST (UTC+2)	Babin 34'; Díaz 71'	Report	Moreno 82'	Stadium: El Molinón; Attendance: 10,240; Referee: Dámaso Arcediano Monescillo

3 September 2021 4	Girona	1–2	Sporting Gijón	Girona
21:00 CEST (UTC+2)	Lozano 86'	Report	Campos 15'; Valiente 58'	Stadium: Montilivi; Referee: Daniel Jesús Trujillo Suárez

10 September 2021 5	Sporting Gijón	2–1	Leganés	Gijón
21:00 CEST (UTC+2)	García 4'; Villalba 62'	Report	Merino 79'	Stadium: El Molinón; Attendance: 11,212; Referee: Javier Iglesias Villanueva

19 September 2021 6	Eibar	3–2	Sporting Gijón	Eibar
18:15 CEST (UTC+2)				Stadium: Ipurua

26 September 2021 7	Sporting Gijón	2–1	Málaga	Gijón
16:00 CEST (UTC+2)				Stadium: El Molinón

2 October 2021 8	Amorebieta	1–1	Sporting Gijón	Amorebieta-Etxano
16:00 CEST (UTC+2)				Stadium: Lezama (field 2)

9 October 2021 9	Oviedo	1–1	Sporting Gijón	Oviedo
21:00 CEST (UTC+2)				Stadium: Estadio Carlos Tartiere

16 October 2021 10	Sporting Gijón	1–0	Alcorcón	Gijón
21:00 CEST (UTC+2)	Đurđević 90+1'			Stadium: El Molinón

19 October 2021 11	Cartagena	1–0	Sporting Gijón	Cartagena
19:00 CEST (UTC+2)				Stadium: Estadio Cartagonova

23 October 2021 12	Sporting Gijón	1–2	Valladolid	Gijón
CEST (UTC+2)				Stadium: El Molinón

30 October 2021 13	Lugo	1–1	Sporting Gijón	Lugo
18:15 CEST (UTC+2)				Stadium: Estadio Anxo Carro

2 November 2021 14	Sporting Gijón	0–1	Almería	Gijón
19:00 CET	Pablo García (yellow card) 83'	Report	Sadiq (yellow card) 73'; José Carlos Lazo 90+3' (yellow card) 90+3'	Stadium: El Molinón; Attendance: 11,980; Referee: Álvaro Moreno Aragón

7 November 2021 15	Zaragoza	2–0	Sporting Gijón	Zaragoza
16:00 CET (UTC+1)	Borja Sainz 30'; Petrović (yellow card) 45+1'; Nano (yellow card) 59' (goal) 62'; Jair Amador (yellow card) 80'; Fran Gámez (yellow card) 88'	Report	Gaspar Campos (yellow card) 26'; Đurđević (yellow card) 68'; Pedro Díaz (yellow card) 77'	Stadium: La Romareda; Attendance: 18,100; Referee: Javier Iglesias Villanueva

12 November 2021 16	Sporting Gijón	0–1	Real Sociedad B	Gijón
21:00 CET (UTC+1)	Babin (yellow card) 35'; Villalba (yellow card) 90+2'	Report	Olasagasti 63'; Sangalli (yellow card) 80'	Stadium: El Molinón; Attendance: 12,452; Referee: Raúl Martín González Francés

27 November 2021 18	Sporting Gijón	1–1	Fuenlabrada	Gijón
CEST (UTC+2)				Stadium: El Molinón

10 December 2021 20	Sporting Gijón	1–1	Huesca	Gijón
CEST (UTC+2)				Stadium: El Molinón

18 December 2021 21	Ibiza	0–2	Sporting Gijón	Ibiza
16:00 CEST (UTC+2)		Report		Stadium: Can Misses

2 January 2022 22	Sporting Gijón	1–1	Lugo	Gijón
CEST (UTC+2)				Stadium: El Molinón

9 January 2022 23	Málaga	2–2	Sporting Gijón	Málaga
18:15 CEST (UTC+2)		Report		Stadium: La Rosaleda

23 January 2022 24	Sporting Gijón	2–1	Amorebieta	Gijón
CEST (UTC+2)				Stadium: El Molinón

28 January 2022 25	Valladolid	1–0	Sporting Gijón	Valladolid
21:00 CEST (UTC+2)	Mesa 73'			Stadium: Estadio José Zorrilla

5 February 2022 26	Sporting Gijón	0–1	Eibar	Gijón
20:30 CEST (UTC+2)	Ramírez (yellow card) 89'; Fran Villalba (yellow card) 90+3'	Report	José Corpas 20'; Stoichkov (yellow card) 49'; Miguel Atienza (yellow card) 90+3'	Stadium: El Molinón; Attendance: 15,575; Referee: (Spain) José López Toca

12 February 2022 27	Mirandés	0–3	Sporting Gijón	Miranda de Ebro
16:00 CEST (UTC+2)				Stadium: Estadio Municipal de Anduva

20 February 2022 28	Sporting Gijón	2–3	Ponferradina	Gijón
CEST (UTC+2)				Stadium: El Molinón

27 February 2022 29	Sporting Gijón	1–2	Zaragoza	Gijón
CEST (UTC+2)				Stadium: El Molinón

7 March 2022 30	Real Sociedad B	2–1	Sporting Gijón	San Sebastián
21:00 CEST (UTC+2)		Report		Stadium: Anoeta

13 March 2022 31	Sporting Gijón	1–2	Tenerife	Gijón
CEST (UTC+2)		Report		Stadium: El Molinón

20 March 2022 32	Leganés	1–1	Sporting Gijón	Leganés
18:15 CEST (UTC+2)		Report		Stadium: Estadio Municipal de Butarque

26 March 2022 33	Sporting Gijón	4–1	Cartagena	Gijón
CEST (UTC+2)		Report		Stadium: El Molinón

3 April 2022 34	Burgos	0–0	Sporting Gijón	Burgos
16:00 CEST (UTC+2)		Report		Stadium: Estadio El Plantío

9 April 2022 35	Alcorcón	1–1	Sporting Gijón	Alcorcón
18:15 CEST (UTC+2)		Report		Stadium: Estadio Municipal de Santo Domingo

16 April 2022 36	Sporting Gijón	0–1	Oviedo	Gijón
CEST (UTC+2)		Report		Stadium: El Molinón

25 April 2022 37	Almería	1–0	Sporting Gijón	Almería
21:00 CET	Rodrigo Ely (yellow card) 40'; Curro Sánchez 90+1'	Report	Aitor García (yellow card) 34'; Juan Berrocal (yellow card) 66'	Stadium: Estadio de los Juegos Mediterráneos; Attendance: 9,897; Referee: (Spain) Jon González Esteban

1 May 2022 38	Sporting Gijón	0–1	Ibiza	Gijón
16:00 CEST (UTC+2)		Report		Stadium: El Molinón

7 May 2022 39	Huesca	1–1	Sporting Gijón	Huesca
16:00 CEST (UTC+2)				Stadium: Estadio El Alcoraz

15 May 2022 40	Sporting Gijón	2–1	Girona	Gijón
16:00 CEST (UTC+2)				Stadium: El Molinón

21 May 2022 41	Fuenlabrada	0–0	Sporting Gijón	Fuenlabrada
21:00 CEST (UTC+2)				Stadium: Estadio Fernando Torres

29 May 2022 42	Sporting Gijón	0–1	Las Palmas	Gijón
18:30 CEST (UTC+2)				Stadium: El Molinón

=== Copa del Rey ===
30 November 2021 First round	Ceares	0–1	Sporting Gijón	Gijón (Note: Ceares played its game at El Molinón, in Gijón instead of their regular stadium La Cruz as it does not meet the requirements established by the Royal Spanish Football Federation.)
20:00 CET (UTC+1)		Report	César 38'	Stadium: El Molinón; Referee: Javier Iglesias Villanueva

15 December 2021 Second round	Sporting Gijón	2–1 (a.e.t.)	Alcorcón	Gijón
20:00 CET (UTC+1)	Méndez 42'; Đurđević 99'	Report	Al Badaoui 57'	Stadium: El Molinón; Attendance: 7,300; Referee: Jon Ander González Esteban

6 January 2022 Round of 32	Sporting Gijón	2–1	Villarreal	Gijón
18:00 CET (UTC+1)	Đurđević 67'; Milovanov 88'	Report	Albiol 48'	Stadium: El Molinón; Referee: Alejandro Muñiz Ruiz

15 January 2022 Round of 16	Sporting Gijón	0–0 (a.e.t.) (2–4 p)	Cádiz	Gijón
18:30 CET (UTC+1)		Report		Stadium: El Molinón; Referee: Miguel Ángel Ortiz Arias
	Penalties
	Villalba (penalty missed); Díaz (penalty missed); Kravets (penalty scored); Campuzano (penalty scored)		(penalty scored) Fernández; (penalty scored) Negredo; (penalty scored) Perea; (penalty scored) Arzamendia
