= José Gragera =

Spanish footballer

Personal information
- Full name: José Gragera Amado
- Date of birth: 14 May 2000 (age 26)
- Place of birth: Gijón, Spain
- Height: 1.86 m (6 ft 1 in)
- Position: Midfielder

Team information
- Current team: Burgos (on loan from Espanyol)

Youth career
- La Asunción
- 2008–2018: Sporting Gijón

Senior career*
Years	Team	Apps	(Gls)
2017–2020	Sporting B	56	(1)
2019–2023	Sporting Gijón	91	(4)
2023–	Espanyol	53	(2)
2025–2026	→ Deportivo La Coruña (loan)	11	(0)
2026–	→ Burgos (loan)	0	(0)

International career^{‡}
2018	Spain U19	1	(0)
2021–2022	Spain U21	5	(1)
- * Club domestic league appearances and goals as of 31 May 2026 ‡ National team caps and goals as of 27 September 2022

José Gragera Amado (born 14 May 2000) is a Spanish footballer who plays as a central midfielder for Burgos CF, on loan from RCD Espanyol.

== Club career ==
Gragera was born in Gijón, Asturias, and joined Sporting de Gijón's youth setup in 2008, from La Asunción CF. On 24 January 2018, while still a youth, he signed a professional three-year deal with the club.

Gragera made his senior debut with the reserves on 16 December 2017, coming on as a late substitute for Pedro Díaz in a 1–0 Segunda División B away win against Arenas Club de Getxo. He scored his first goal the following 14 October, netting the B's second in a 2–0 win at CD Izarra.

Gragera made his first team debut on 8 June 2019, again replacing Díaz in a 1–0 home defeat of Cádiz CF in the Segunda División. He scored his first professional goal on 20 September 2020, netting the game's only in an away success over FC Cartagena.

On 31 January 2023, Gragera signed a five-and-a-half-year contract with La Liga side RCD Espanyol. He made his debut in the category on 4 February, playing 30 minutes in a 1–1 home draw against CA Osasuna, and scored his first goal in the division on 18 March, but in a 3–1 home loss to RC Celta de Vigo.

Gragera became a regular starter in the 2023–24 campaign as the Pericos returned to the top tier at first attempt, but subsequently had limited playing time due to injuries. On 30 July 2025, he moved to second division side Deportivo de La Coruña on loan for one year.

On 25 July 2026, after another top-tier promotion, Gragera moved to second division side Burgos CF also on a one-year loan deal.

== Career statistics ==
As of 23 June 2024

Appearances and goals by club, season and competition
Club	Season	League			Copa del Rey		Europe		Other		Total	
Club	Season	Division	Apps	Goals	Apps	Goals	Apps	Goals	Apps	Goals	Apps	Goals
Sporting B	2017–18	Segunda División B	1	0	—		—		—		1	0
Sporting B	2018–19	Segunda División B	32	1	—		—		—		32	1
Sporting B	2019–20	Segunda División B	23	0	—		—		—		23	0
Sporting B	Total		56	1	0	0	0	0	0	0	56	1
Sporting Gijón	2018–19	Segunda División	1	0	0	0	—		—		1	0
Sporting Gijón	2019–20	Segunda División	4	0	2	0	—		—		4	0
Sporting Gijón	2020–21	Segunda División	32	1	1	0	—		—		33	1
Sporting Gijón	2021–22	Segunda División	37	1	2	0	—		—		39	1
Sporting Gijón	2022–23	Segunda División	17	2	3	0	—		—		20	2
Sporting Gijón	Total		91	4	8	0	0	0	0	0	99	4
Espanyol	2023–24	Segunda División	30	1	2	0	—		4	0	36	1
Career total			177	6	10	0	0	0	4	0	191	6
