= Diego Sánchez (footballer, born 2003) =

Spanish footballer

Personal information
- Full name: Diego Sánchez Pérez
- Date of birth: 18 July 2003 (age 23)
- Place of birth: Avilés, Spain
- Position: Left back

Team information
- Current team: Sporting Gijón
- Number: 5

Youth career
- 2011–2021: Sporting Gijón

Senior career*
Years	Team	Apps	(Gls)
2021–2022	Sporting B	42	(2)
2022–	Sporting Gijón	106	(2)
- * Club domestic league appearances and goals as of 6 June 2026

Diego Sánchez Pérez (born 18 July 2003) is a Spanish professional footballer who plays as a left back for Sporting de Gijón.

== Club career ==
Born in Avilés, Asturias, Sánchez joined Sporting de Gijón's Mareo in 2011, aged eight. He made his senior debut with the reserves on 14 February 2021, coming on as a late substitute in a 0–1 Segunda División B away loss against CD Lealtad.

Sánchez scored his first senior goal on 16 May 2021, netting the B's third in a 3–1 home win over CD Guijuelo, as both sides were already relegated. On 23 July, he renewed his contract for a further two seasons, being definitely assigned to the reserve side.

Sánchez made his first team debut on 29 May 2022, replacing fellow youth graduate Pablo García in a 0–1 home loss against UD Las Palmas in the Segunda División. The following 16 February, he renewed his contract until 2027 and was definitely promoted to the main squad.
