= Juan Aspra =

Spanish footballer

Personal information
- Full name: Juan Aspra Fernández
- Date of birth: 30 July 2002 (age 24)
- Place of birth: Oviedo, Spain
- Height: 1.79 m (5 ft 10 in)
- Position: Left back

Team information
- Current team: Antequera
- Number: 20

Youth career
- Astur
- Sporting Gijón

Senior career*
Years	Team	Apps	(Gls)
2021–2023	Sporting B	48	(0)
2023	Sporting Gijón	1	(0)
2023–2024	Marino Luanco	30	(1)
2024–	Antequera	60	(1)
- * Club domestic league appearances and goals as of 10 June 2026

Juan Aspra Fernández (born 30 July 2002) is a Spanish professional footballer who plays as a left back for Antequera.

== Club career ==
Born in Oviedo, Asturias, Aspra joined Sporting de Gijón's Mareo from Astur CF. He made his senior debut with the reserves on 30 January 2021, coming on as a second-half substitute in a 1–1 Segunda División B away draw against CD Numancia.

On 17 June 2021, Aspra renewed his contract with the Rojiblancos and was definitely promoted to the B-team. He made his first team debut on 26 March 2023, replacing fellow youth graduate Pedro Díaz late into a 1–1 draw at UD Las Palmas in the Segunda División.
