= Nacho Méndez =

Spanish footballer

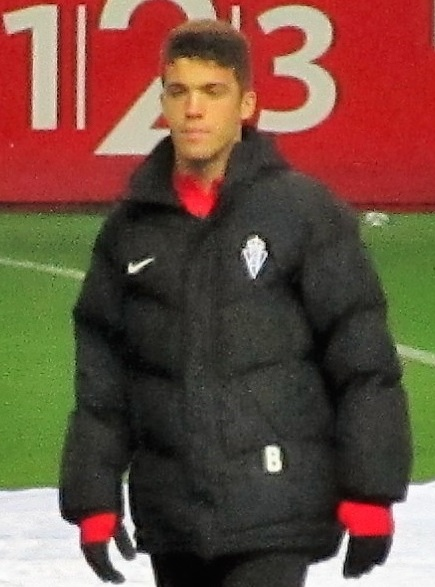

Personal information
- Full name: Ignacio Méndez-Navia Fernández
- Date of birth: 30 March 1998 (age 28)
- Place of birth: Luanco, Spain
- Height: 1.78 m (5 ft 10 in)
- Position: Midfielder

Team information
- Current team: Johor Darul Ta'zim
- Number: 28

Youth career
- Roces
- 2010–2016: Sporting Gijón

Senior career*
Years	Team	Apps	(Gls)
2016–2018	Sporting B	23	(1)
2017–2025	Sporting Gijón	205	(15)
2025–	Johor Darul Ta'zim	18	(1)
- * Club domestic league appearances and goals as of 27 February 2026

Ignacio "Nacho" Méndez-Navia Fernández (born 30 March 1998) is a Spanish professional footballer who plays as a central midfielder for Malaysia Super League club Johor Darul Ta'zim.

== Club career ==
=== Sporting Gijón ===
Born in Luanco, Asturias, Méndez joined Sporting de Gijón's youth setup in 2010, from TSK Roces. He made his senior debut with the reserves on 21 August 2016, coming on as a second-half substitute and scoring his team's sixth in a 7–0 Tercera División home routing of UC Ceares.

On 26 April 2017, Méndez renewed his contract until 2019. After spending the whole 2017 pre-season with the first team, he made his professional debut on 27 August by starting in a 2–0 home win against CD Lugo in the Segunda División.

Méndez scored his first professional goal on 6 September 2017, netting the game's only in an away success over CF Reus Deportiu, in the season's Copa del Rey. On 22 December, he extended his contract until 2021, being definitely promoted to the main squad ahead of the following season.

On 8 October 2020, Méndez further extended his link with Sporting until 2025.

=== Johor Darul Ta'zim ===
On 9 July 2025, Méndez joined Johor Darul Ta'zim on a free transfer to compete in the 2025–26 Malaysia Super League. He was the fourth foreign-born player with reported Malaysian ancestry signed by the club during the transfer window, after Héctor Hevel, Jon Irazábal and João Figueiredo. He was registered in the league as a local player rather than as one of the club's foreign imports.

== Personal life ==
In July 2025, the Malaysian broadcaster Astro Awani reported that Méndez had Malaysian ancestry through a grandfather said to have been born in Penang, and that he was completing documentation to become eligible for the Malaysia national football team.

In September 2025, FIFA sanctioned the FAM and seven foreign-born players who had been fielded by Malaysia on the basis of claimed ancestry. The seven included Méndez's Johor Darul Ta'zim teammates Hevel, Irazábal and Figueiredo. FIFA found that forged or falsified documents concerning the players' grandparents had been used in their eligibility submissions. The FIFA Appeal Committee upheld the decision in November 2025, and the Court of Arbitration for Sport ruled in March 2026 that the falsification of eligibility documents had been established.

Méndez was not among the players sanctioned but was repeatedly left out of Malaysia squads. Malaysia head coach Peter Cklamovski said in August 2025 that Méndez faced a "physical and medical situation" and needed time to recover fully. After a further omission in November 2025, sections of the Malaysian press questioned his status as a heritage player. In March 2026, Cklamovski said an injury sustained with his club had ruled Méndez out of a 2027 AFC Asian Cup qualifier. In September 2026, interim head coach Tan Cheng Hoe left Méndez out of Malaysia's 23-man squad for the 2026 FIFA ASEAN Cup in Indonesia. Asked about the omission, Méndez said that choosing the squad was not his role and that he was focusing on Johor Darul Ta'zim's matches. As of October 2026, he has not played for Malaysia.

== Career statistics ==
As of match played 4 November 2023

Club statistics
Club	Season	League			National Cup		Other		Total	
Club	Season	Division	Apps	Goals	Apps	Goals	Apps	Goals	Apps	Goals
Sporting Gijón B	2017–18	Segunda División B	19	0	—		4 (Note: Appearances in the 2018 Segunda División B play-offs)	1	23	1
Sporting Gijón	2017–18	Segunda División	11	0	2	1	—		13	1
Sporting Gijón	2018–19	Segunda División	31	2	5	0	—		36	2
Sporting Gijón	2019–20	Segunda División	28	3	1	0	—		29	3
Sporting Gijón	2020–21	Segunda División	23	0	1	0	—		24	0
Sporting Gijón	2021–22	Segunda División	29	1	4	1	—		33	2
Sporting Gijón	2022–23	Segunda División	3	0	0	0	—		3	0
Sporting Gijón	2023–24	Segunda División	14	1	0	0	—		14	1
Sporting Gijón	Total		139	7	13	2	0	0	152	9
Career totals			158	7	13	2	4	1	175	10

== Honours ==
Individual

- ASEAN Club Championship: Allstar XI 2025–26
