= Antequera CF =

Association football club in Spain

Antequera
- Full name: Antequera Club de Fútbol
- Nicknames: Verdiblancos (Green White); Marea Verde (Green Tide)
- Founded: 1992; 34 years ago
- Stadium: El Maulí
- Capacity: 6,000
- Owner: Mike Garlick
- President: Ángel Luis González
- Head coach: Abraham Paz
- League: Primera Federación – Group 2
- 2025–26: Primera Federación – Group 2, 7th of 20
- Website: antequeracf.es
Home colours	Away colours

Antequera Club de Fútbol is a Spanish football team based in Antequera, in the autonomous community of Andalusia. Founded in 1992, it currently plays in Primera Federación – Group 2, holding home games at Estadio El Maulí, with a capacity of 6,000 seats.

== History ==
Antequera Club de Fútbol was founded in 1992, through a merger between CD Puerto Malagueño and CD Antequerano. In the 2012–13 season the club won the Primera Andaluza and started the next season in the Group 9 of Tercera División.

On September 15, 2015, Antequera appointed José Jesús Aybar as a new head coach of the club.

=== Club background ===
Club Deportivo Antequerano - (1939–1992) → ↓

Club de Fútbol Antequera-Puerto Malagueño - (1992–1996) → Antequera Club de Fútbol - (1996–present)

Club Deportivo Puerto Malagueño - (1957–1992) → ↑

== Season to season ==
Season	Tier	Division	Place	Copa del Rey
1992–93	5	Reg. Pref.	2nd	
1993–94	4	3ª	17th	
1994–95	4	3ª	6th	
1995–96	4	3ª	7th	
1996–97	4	3ª	16th	
1997–98	4	3ª	16th	
1998–99	4	3ª	11th	
1999–2000	4	3ª	14th	
2000–01	4	3ª	15th	
2001–02	4	3ª	7th	
2002–03	4	3ª	13th	
2003–04	4	3ª	21st	
2004–05	5	1ª And.	3rd	
2005–06	5	1ª And.	2nd	
2006–07	4	3ª	8th	
2007–08	4	3ª	2nd	
2008–09	3	2ª B	16th	
2009–10	4	3ª	10th	
2010–11	4	3ª	7th	
2011–12	4	3ª	19th	

Season	Tier	Division	Place	Copa del Rey
2012–13	5	1ª And.	1st	
2013–14	4	3ª	13th	
2014–15	4	3ª	15th	
2015–16	4	3ª	6th	
2016–17	4	3ª	2nd	
2017–18	4	3ª	4th	Second round
2018–19	4	3ª	3rd	
2019–20	4	3ª	7th	
2020–21	4	3ª	2nd / 4th	
2021–22	4	2ª RFEF	12th	
2022–23	4	2ª Fed.	1st	
2023–24	3	1ª Fed.	8th	Second round
2024–25	3	1ª Fed.	5th	
2025–26	3	1ª Fed.	7th	First round
2026–27	3	1ª Fed.		TBD

- 4 seasons in Primera Federación
- 1 season in Segunda División B
- 2 seasons in Segunda Federación/Segunda División RFEF
- 23 seasons in Tercera División

== Current squad ==
As of 5 November 2026

Note: Flags indicate national team as defined under FIFA eligibility rules; some limited exceptions apply. Players may hold more than one non-FIFA nationality.

No.	Pos.	Nation	Player
1	GK	ESP	Fer Pérez
2	DF	ESP	Javi Antón
3	DF	ESP	Julio Martínez
4	DF	ESP	Iván Pérez
6	DF	ESP	Alberto Quintana
7	FW	NGR	Destiny Ilahude
8	MF	ESP	Rafa Diz
9	FW	ESP	Pablo Rodríguez
10	MF	ESP	Luismi Gutiérrez
11	FW	ESP	Moi Parra
13	GK	ESP	Dani Alcover
14	FW	ESP	Agüero

No.	Pos.	Nation	Player
15	DF	ESP	Raúl Giménez
16	FW	ESP	Adrià Gené
17	FW	ESP	Antonio Zarzana
18	MF	ESP	Carlos Mangada
19	MF	SEN	Moha Bassèle
20	MF	ESP	Juan Aspra
21	MF	ANT	Drake Hadeed
22	DF	ESP	David Cuenca
23	FW	ESP	Isra Domínguez
24	DF	ESP	Raúl Alarcón
29	DF	ESP	Samu Almagro
—	GK	ESP	Samu Pérez

=== Reserve team ===
Note: Flags indicate national team as defined under FIFA eligibility rules; some limited exceptions apply. Players may hold more than one non-FIFA nationality.

No.	Pos.	Nation	Player
26	MF	ESP	Óscar Sáez
27	MF	ESP	Ángel González

No.	Pos.	Nation	Player
30	FW	ESP	Alejandro Joya
31	GK	ESP	Alberto Sánchez

=== Out on loan ===
Note: Flags indicate national team as defined under FIFA eligibility rules; some limited exceptions apply. Players may hold more than one non-FIFA nationality.

No.	Pos.	Nation	Player
