= Nacho Martín (footballer, born 2002) =

Spanish footballer

Personal information
- Full name: Ignacio Martín Gómez
- Date of birth: 19 March 2002 (age 24)
- Place of birth: Noreña, Spain
- Height: 1.75 m (5 ft 9 in)
- Position: Midfielder

Team information
- Current team: Sporting Gijón
- Number: 6

Youth career
- Condal
- 2019–2020: Sporting Gijón

Senior career*
Years	Team	Apps	(Gls)
2020–2022	Sporting B	45	(0)
2022–	Sporting Gijón	97	(1)
- * Club domestic league appearances and goals as of 6 June 2026

Ignacio "Nacho" Martín Gómez (born 19 March 2002) is a Spanish professional footballer who plays as a midfielder for Sporting de Gijón.

== Club career ==
Born in Noreña, Asturias, Martín joined Sporting de Gijón's Mareo from Condal CF. He made his senior debut with the reserves on 17 October 2020, starting in a 4–2 Segunda División B home loss against Cultural y Deportiva Leonesa.

On 1 July 2021, Martín renewed his contract with the Rojiblancos and was definitely promoted to the B-team. He made his first team debut on 7 October 2022, coming on as a late substitute for Pol Valentín in a 3–1 home win over Villarreal CF B in the Segunda División.

On 24 June 2025, after establishing himself in the first team, Martín further extended his link with Sporting until 2029.
