= Joel Jiménez =

Spanish footballer (born 2000)

Personal information
- Full name: Joel Jiménez Portero
- Date of birth: 20 January 2000 (age 26)
- Place of birth: Avilés, Spain
- Height: 1.87 m (6 ft 2 in)
- Position: Goalkeeper

Team information
- Current team: La Unión Atlético
- Number: 1

Youth career
- Avilés Deportivo
- 2013–2019: Sporting Gijón

Senior career*
Years	Team	Apps	(Gls)
2019–2023	Sporting B	23	(0)
2022–2023	Sporting Gijón	0	(0)
2022–2023	→ Real Unión (loan)	2	(0)
2023–2024	Utebo	15	(0)
2024–2025	Talavera	30	(0)
2025–2026	Numancia	13	(0)
2026–	La Unión Atlético	6	(0)
- * Club domestic league appearances and goals as of 15 May 2026

Joel Jiménez Portero (born 20 January 2000) is a Spanish footballer who plays as a goalkeeper for Segunda Federación club La Unión Atlético.

== Club career ==
Born in Avilés, Asturias, Jiménez joined Sporting de Gijón's Mareo from Avilés Deportivo CF. He was promoted to the reserves in Segunda División B ahead of the 2019–20 campaign, and made his senior debut on 20 October 2019, starting in a 0–1 home loss against Real Oviedo Vetusta.

A backup to Christian Joel, Jiménez became a first-choice for the B-side in the 2021–22 season, with the team now in Tercera División RFEF. He made his first team debut on 15 January 2022, coming on as an extra-time substitute for Diego Mariño in a 0–0 Copa del Rey home draw against Cádiz CF, as an attempt of manager David Gallego to use him on the penalty shoot-outs; Sporting was ultimately knocked out after Cádiz scored all penalties and won by 4–2.

On 9 August 2022, Jiménez was loaned to Primera Federación side Real Unión, for one year.
