= Enol Coto =

Spanish footballer

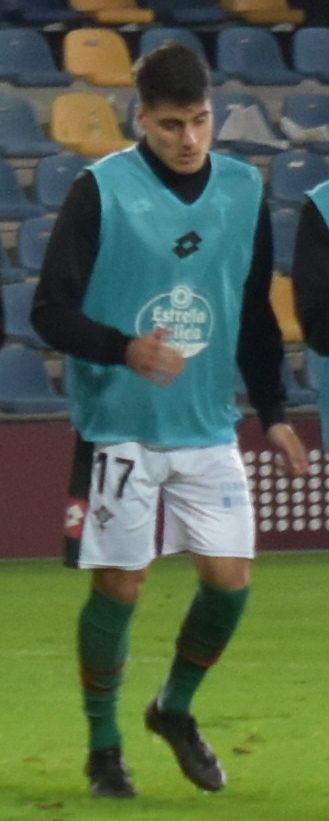
- Coto with Racing Ferrol in 2022

Personal information
- Full name: Enol Coto Serrano
- Date of birth: 23 March 2001 (age 25)
- Place of birth: Gijón, Spain
- Height: 1.74 m (5 ft 9 in)
- Position: Right back

Team information
- Current team: Ourense
- Number: 2

Youth career
- 2007–2012: Romanón
- 2012–2020: Sporting Gijón

Senior career*
Years	Team	Apps	(Gls)
2019–2023	Sporting B	54	(0)
2022–2023	→ Racing Ferrol (loan)	26	(0)
2023–2024	Sporting Gijón	2	(0)
2024	→ Murcia (loan)	11	(0)
2024–2025	Amorebieta	29	(1)
2025–	Ourense	32	(2)
- * Club domestic league appearances and goals as of 10 June 2026

Enol Coto Serrano (born 23 March 2001) is a Spanish footballer who plays as a right back for Primera Federación club Ourense.

== Club career ==
Born in Gijón, Asturias, Coto joined Sporting de Gijón's Mareo at the age of 11, from lowly CD Romanón. He made his senior debut with the reserves on 24 August 2019, starting in a 1–0 Segunda División B away loss against CF Rayo Majadahonda.

On 17 June 2020, after finishing his formation, Coto signed a new three-year contract and was definitely promoted to the B-team. On 5 August 2022, he was loaned to Primera Federación side Racing de Ferrol for the season.

Coto was a regular starter for Racing as they achieved promotion to Segunda División after 15 years, and returned to Sporting in July 2023. He made his professional debut on 11 August 2023, starting in a 2–0 away loss to Real Valladolid.

On 9 January 2024, Coto was loaned to third division side Real Murcia CF for the remainder of the season.

On 7 August 2024, Coto signed with Amorebieta in the third tier.
