= Moi Parra =

Spanish footballer

Personal information
- Full name: Moisés Parra Gutiérrez
- Date of birth: 24 June 2002 (age 24)
- Place of birth: Huelva, Spain
- Position: Winger

Team information
- Current team: Antequera
- Number: 17

Youth career
- Siempre Alegres
- 2020–2021: Recreativo

Senior career*
Years	Team	Apps	(Gls)
2019–2020	La Palma	8	(1)
2021	Recreativo B	1	(0)
2021–2022	Extremadura B	13	(0)
2022	Extremadura	4	(0)
2022–2024	Getafe B	60	(5)
2022–2024	Getafe	1	(0)
2024	Linense	5	(0)
2024–2025	Coria	14	(1)
2025–2026	Septemvri Sofia	34	(1)
2026–	Antequera	15	(0)
- * Club domestic league appearances and goals as of 10 June 2026

Moisés "Moi" Parra Gutiérrez (born 24 June 2002) is a Spanish professional footballer who plays as a left winger for Primera Federación club Antequera.

== Club career ==
Born in Huelva, Andalusia, Parra made his senior debut with local side La Palma CF in the División de Honor. In 2020, he moved to Recreativo de Huelva, being initially assigned to the Juvenil squad.

In 2021, Parra signed for Extremadura UD and was initially assigned to the reserves in Tercera División RFEF. The following 26 January, despite appearing with the first team in Primera División RFEF, he left the club as their financial situation worsened, and signed for another reserve team on 5 February 2022, Getafe CF B.

Parra made his first team – and La Liga – debut on 15 August 2022, coming on as a late substitute for Borja Mayoral in a 3–0 home loss against Atlético Madrid.

In February 2025, he joined Septemvri Sofia in Bulgaria.

On 7 January 2026, Parra returned to Spain and signed a one-and-a-half-year contract with Antequera in the third tier.
