= 2018–19 Deportivo de La Coruña season =

Deportivo de La Coruña
2018–19 season
- President: Francisco Zas
- Head coach: José Luis Martí
- Stadium: Abanca-Riazor
- Segunda División: 6th
- Copa del Rey: Second round
- Top goalscorer: League: Quique (17 goals); All: Quique (17 goals)
| Home colours | Away colours | Third colours |

The 2018–19 season was Deportivo de La Coruña's 112th season in existence and the club's first season back in the second division of Spanish football. In addition to the domestic league, Deportivo de La Coruña participated in this season's edition of the Copa del Rey. The season covered the period from 1 July 2018 to 30 June 2019.

== Players ==
=== Current squad ===
As of 24 March 2019

Note: Flags indicate national team as defined under FIFA eligibility rules; some limited exceptions apply. Players may hold more than one non-FIFA nationality.

| No. | Pos. | Nation | Player |
|---|---|---|---|
| 1 | GK | ESP | Dani Giménez |
| 2 | DF | ESP | David Simón |
| 3 | DF | ESP | Saúl García |
| 4 | MF | ESP | Álex Bergantiños (captain) |
| 5 | MF | ESP | Pedro Mosquera (2nd captain) |
| 6 | DF | POR | Domingos Duarte (on loan from Sporting CP) |
| 7 | FW | ESP | Quique |
| 8 | MF | ESP | Vicente Gómez |
| 9 | FW | VEN | Christian Santos |
| 10 | MF | ESP | Matías Nahuel (on loan from Olympiacos) |
| 11 | MF | ARG | Fede Cartabia |
| 12 | DF | ITA | Michele Somma |
| 13 | GK | ESP | Adrián Ortolá (on loan from Barcelona) |

| No. | Pos. | Nation | Player |
|---|---|---|---|
| 14 | MF | DEN | Michael Krohn-Dehli |
| 15 | MF | ESP | Pedro Sánchez |
| 16 | DF | ARG | Sebastián Dubarbier |
| 17 | DF | ESP | Diego Caballo |
| 18 | FW | ESP | Carlos Fernández (on loan from Sevilla) |
| 19 | MF | ESP | Borja Valle |
| 20 | MF | COL | Didier Moreno (on loan from Independiente Medellín) |
| 21 | MF | ESP | Edu Expósito |
| 22 | DF | ESP | Pablo Marí (on loan from Manchester City) |
| 23 | DF | ESP | Íñigo López |
| 24 | DF | ESP | Eneko Bóveda |
| 25 | MF | POR | Vítor Silva |

=== Out on loan ===
Note: Flags indicate national team as defined under FIFA eligibility rules; some limited exceptions apply. Players may hold more than one non-FIFA nationality.

| No. | Pos. | Nation | Player |
|---|---|---|---|
| — | GK | NGA | Francis Uzoho (on loan at Anorthosis Famagusta until 30 June 2019) |
| — | DF | ESP | Juanfran (on loan at Leganés until 30 June 2019) |
| — | DF | ESP | Róber Pier (on loan at Levante until 30 June 2019) |

| No. | Pos. | Nation | Player |
|---|---|---|---|
| — | DF | ESP | Gerard Valentín (on loan at Lugo until 30 June 2019) |
| — | FW | URU | Diego Rolán (on loan at Alavés until 30 June 2019) |
| — | FW | POR | Pedro Martelo (on loan at Braga B until 30 June 2019) |

== Transfers ==
=== In ===
| Date | Player | From | Type | Fee | Ref |
|---|---|---|---|---|---|
| 26 May 2018 | (Spain) Dani Giménez | (Spain) Real Betis | Transfer | Free | |
| 15 June 2018 | (Argentina) Sebastián Dubarbier | (Argentina) Estudiantes | Transfer | Free | |
| 28 June 2018 | (Spain) Pedro | (Spain) Granada | Transfer | Free | |
| 28 June 2018 | (Venezuela) Christian Santos | (Spain) Alavés | Transfer | Free | |
| 30 June 2018 | (Spain) Álex Bergantiños | (Spain) Sporting Gijón | Loan return | | |
| 30 June 2018 | (Spain) Saúl García | (Spain) Numancia | Loan return | | |
| 30 June 2018 | (Spain) Róber Pier | (Spain) Levante | Loan return | | |
| 1 July 2018 | (Spain) Pablo Marí | (England) Manchester City | Loan | | |

=== Out ===
| Date | Player | To | Type | Fee | Ref |
|---|---|---|---|---|---|
| 31 May 2018 | (Turkey) Emre Çolak | (Saudi Arabia) Al-Wehda | Transfer | €1M | |
| 8 June 2018 | (Romania) Florin Andone | (England) Brighton & Hove Albion | Transfer | £5.4M | |
| 15 June 2018 | (Portugal) Luisinho | (Spain) Huesca | Transfer | Free | |
| 30 June 2018 | (Belgium) Zakaria Bakkali | (Spain) Valencia | Loan return | | |
| 30 June 2018 | (Spain) Carles Gil | (England) Aston Villa | Loan return | | |
| 30 June 2018 | (Ukraine) Maksym Koval | (Ukraine) Dynamo Kyiv | Loan return | | |
| 30 June 2018 | (Spain) Adrián López | (Portugal) Porto | Loan return | | |
| 30 June 2018 | (Spain) Rubén Martínez | TBD | | Free | |
| 30 June 2018 | (Ghana) Sulley Muntari | TBD | | Free | |
| 30 June 2018 | (Spain) Fernando Navarro | TBD | | Free | |
| 30 June 2018 | (Spain) Lucas Pérez | (England) Arsenal | Loan return | | |
| 30 June 2018 | (Uruguay) Federico Valverde | (Spain) Real Madrid Castilla | Loan return | | |
| 12 July 2018 | (Spain) Juanfran | (Spain) Leganés | Loan | | |
| 26 July 2018 | (Uruguay) Diego Rolán | (Spain) Leganés | Loan | | |
| 2 August 2018 | (Brazil) Sidnei | (Spain) Real Betis | Transfer | €4.5M | |
| 24 August 2018 | (Nigeria) Francis Uzoho | (Spain) Elche | Loan | | |
| 13 December 2018 | (Poland) Przemysław Tytoń | (United States) Cincinnati | Transfer | Free | |

== Pre-season and friendlies ==
Win Draw Loss

| 25 July 2018 Friendly | Bergantiños (Spain) | 0–3 | (Spain) Deportivo La Coruña | Carballo, Spain |
| 20:00 CEST (UTC+2) | | | | Stadium: As Eiroas |

| 28 July 2018 Friendly | Ponferradina (Spain) | 1–1 | (Spain) Deportivo La Coruña | Ponferrada, Spain |
| 20:00 CEST (UTC+2) | | | | Stadium: El Toralín |

| 1 August 2018 Friendly | Deportivo La Coruña (Spain) | 1–1 | (Spain) Valladolid | A Coruña, Spain |
| 20:00 CEST (UTC+2) | | | | Stadium: Abanca-Riazor |

| 8 August 2018 Friendly | Lugo (Spain) | 1–2 | (Spain) Deportivo La Coruña | Lugo, Spain |
| 20:30 CEST (UTC+2) | | | | Stadium: Anxo Carro |

| 11 August 2018 Friendly | Deportivo La Coruña (Spain) | 1–1 | (Spain) Real Oviedo | Foz, Spain |
| 19:00 CEST (UTC+2) | | | | Stadium: Campo de Fútbol Municipal de Foz |

| 28 August 2018 Friendly | Racing de Ferrol (Spain) | 0–1 | (Spain) Deportivo La Coruña | Ferrol, Spain |
| 20:00 CEST (UTC+2) | | | | Stadium: Estadio Municipal de A Malata |

| 14 November 2018 Friendly | Deportivo La Coruña (Spain) | 2–2 (1–4 p) | (Spain) Athletic Bilbao | A Coruña, Spain |
| 20:45 CET (UTC+1) | Santos 17'; García 86' | | Córdoba 10'; Aduriz 50' | Stadium: Abanca-Riazor |

== Competitions ==
=== Overview ===
| Competition | First match | Last match | Starting round | Final position | Record | | | | | | | |
| Competition | First match | Last match | Starting round | Final position | Pld | W | D | L | GF | GA | GD | Win % |
|---|---|---|---|---|---|---|---|---|---|---|---|---|
| Segunda División | 17 August 2018 | 8 June 2019 | Matchday 1 | 6th | 42 | 17 | 17 | 8 | 50 | 32 | +18 | 40.48 |
| Copa del Rey | 12 September 2018 | | Second round | Second round | 1 | 0 | 0 | 1 | 1 | 2 | −1 | 0.00 |
| Total | | | | | 43 | 17 | 17 | 9 | 51 | 34 | +17 | 39.53 |

Last updated: 23 June 2019
Source: Competitions

=== Segunda División ===
==== League table ====
| Pos | Team | Pld | W | D | L | GF | GA | GD | Pts | Promotion, qualification or relegation |
|---|---|---|---|---|---|---|---|---|---|---|
| 4 | Albacete | 42 | 19 | 14 | 9 | 54 | 38 | +16 | 71 | Qualification to promotion play-offs |
| 5 | Mallorca (O, P) | 42 | 19 | 12 | 11 | 53 | 37 | +16 | 69 | Qualification to promotion play-offs |
| 6 | Deportivo La Coruña | 42 | 17 | 17 | 8 | 50 | 32 | +18 | 68 | Qualification to promotion play-offs |
| 7 | Cádiz | 42 | 16 | 16 | 10 | 53 | 36 | +17 | 64 | |
| 8 | Oviedo | 42 | 17 | 12 | 13 | 48 | 48 | 0 | 63 | |

Source: La Liga
Rules for classification: 1) points; 2) head-to-head points; 3) head-to-head goal difference; 4) goal difference; 5) number of goals scored
(O) Play-off winners; (P) Promoted

==== Results summary ====
| Overall | | | | | | | | Home | | | | | | Away | | | | | |
| Pld | W | D | L | GF | GA | GD | Pts | W | D | L | GF | GA | GD | W | D | L | GF | GA | GD |
|---|---|---|---|---|---|---|---|---|---|---|---|---|---|---|---|---|---|---|---|
| 42 | 17 | 17 | 8 | 50 | 32 | +18 | 68 | 10 | 8 | 3 | 31 | 14 | +17 | 7 | 9 | 5 | 19 | 18 | +1 |

Last updated: 8 June 2019.
Source: La Liga SmartBank

==== Results by round ====
| Round | 1 | 2 | 3 | 4 | 5 | 6 | 7 | 8 | 9 | 10 | 11 | 12 | 13 | 14 | 15 | 16 | 17 | 18 | 19 | 20 | 21 | 22 | 23 | 24 | 25 | 26 | 27 | 28 | 29 | 30 | 31 | 32 | 33 | 34 | 35 | 36 | 37 | 38 | 39 | 40 | 41 | 42 |
|---|---|---|---|---|---|---|---|---|---|---|---|---|---|---|---|---|---|---|---|---|---|---|---|---|---|---|---|---|---|---|---|---|---|---|---|---|---|---|---|---|---|---|
| Ground | A | A | A | H | A | H | A | H | H | A | H | A | H | A | H | A | H | H | A | H | A | H | A | H | A | H | A | H | H | A | H | A | H | A | H | A | A | H | A | H | A | H |
| Result | D | W | D | W | L | W | W | D | W | D | W | D | W | D | W | D | D | W | L | D | L | W | W | D | W | D | D | D | L | W | D | D | L | L | L | W | W | D | L | W | D | W |
| Position | 10 | 7 | 8 | 7 | 8 | 6 | 5 | 5 | 3 | 4 | 3 | 4 | 3 | 4 | 2 | 2 | 3 | 2 | 4 | 3 | 4 | 3 | 3 | 4 | 3 | 4 | 5 | 5 | 5 | 4 | 5 | 5 | 5 | 7 | 7 | 7 | 6 | 7 | 7 | 7 | 6 | 6 |

Updated to match(es) played on 8 June 2019. Source: La Liga SmartBank
A = Away; H = Home; W = Win; D = Draw; L = Loss

==== Matches ====
The fixtures were revealed on 24 July 2018.

| 17 August 2018 1 | Albacete | 1–1 | Deportivo La Coruña | Albacete |
| 22:00 CEST (UTC+2) | | | | Stadium: Carlos Belmonte |

| 24 August 2018 2 | Extremadura | 0–1 | Deportivo La Coruña | Almendralejo |
| 22:00 CEST (UTC+2) | | | | Stadium: Francisco de la Hera |

| 1 September 2018 3 | Tenerife | 2–2 | Deportivo La Coruña | Santa Cruz de Tenerife |
| 20:30 CEST (UTC+2) | | | | Stadium: Heliodoro Rodríguez López |

| 9 September 2018 4 | Deportivo La Coruña | 1–0 | Sporting Gijón | A Coruña |
| 20:45 CEST (UTC+2) | | | | Stadium: Abanca-Riazor |

| 15 September 2018 5 | Alcorcón | 1–0 | Deportivo La Coruña | Alcorcón |
| 20:00 CEST (UTC+2) | | | | Stadium: Santo Domingo |

| 24 September 2018 6 | Deportivo La Coruña | 2–1 | Granada | A Coruña |
| 21:00 CEST (UTC+2) | | | | Stadium: Abanca-Riazor |

| 30 September 2018 7 | Gimnàstic | 1–3 | Deportivo La Coruña | Tarragona |
| 20:30 CEST (UTC+2) | | | | Stadium: Nou Estadi |

| 7 October 2018 8 | Deportivo La Coruña | 1–1 | Málaga | A Coruña |
| 18:00 CEST (UTC+2) | | | | Stadium: Abanca-Riazor |

| 12 October 2018 9 | Deportivo La Coruña | 4–0 | Elche | A Coruña |
| 21:00 CEST (UTC+2) | | | | Stadium: Abanca-Riazor |

| 20 October 2018 10 | Córdoba | 1–1 | Deportivo La Coruña | Córdoba |
| 20:00 CEST (UTC+2) | | | | Stadium: El Arcángel |

| 27 October 2018 11 | Deportivo La Coruña | 2–0 | Reus | A Coruña |
| 16:00 CEST (UTC+2) | | | | Stadium: Abanca-Riazor |

| 3 November 2018 12 | Las Palmas | 1–1 | Deportivo La Coruña | Las Palmas |
| 20:30 CET (UTC+1) | | | | Stadium: Gran Canaria |

| 10 November 2018 13 | Deportivo La Coruña | 4–0 | Real Oviedo | A Coruña |
| 20:30 CET (UTC+1) | | | | Stadium: Abanca-Riazor |

| 19 November 2018 14 | Almería | 1–1 | Deportivo La Coruña | Almería |
| 21:00 CET (UTC+1) | | | | Stadium: Juegos Mediterráneos |

| 24 November 2018 15 | Deportivo La Coruña | 2–0 | Osasuna | A Coruña |
| 18:00 CET (UTC+1) | | | | Stadium: Abanca-Riazor |

| 2 December 2018 16 | Rayo Majadahonda | 0–0 | Deportivo La Coruña | Majadahonda |
| 12:00 CET (UTC+1) | | | | Stadium: Cerro del Espino |

| 8 December 2018 17 | Deportivo La Coruña | 2–2 | Numancia | A Coruña |
| 13:00 CET (UTC+1) | | | | Stadium: Abanca-Riazor |

| 16 December 2018 18 | Deportivo La Coruña | 3–1 | Real Zaragoza | A Coruña |
| 20:30 CET (UTC+1) | | | | Stadium: Abanca-Riazor |

| 22 December 2018 19 | Cádiz | 3–0 | Deportivo La Coruña | Cádiz |
| 20:45 CET (UTC+1) | | | | Stadium: Ramón de Carranza |

| 6 January 2019 20 | Deportivo La Coruña | 0–0 | Lugo | A Coruña |
| 17:30 CET (UTC+1) | | | | Stadium: Abanca-Riazor |

| 12 January 2019 21 | Mallorca | 1–0 | Deportivo La Coruña | Son Moix |
| 20:30 CET (UTC+1) | | | | Stadium: Abanca-Riazor |

| 20 January 2019 22 | Deportivo La Coruña | 2–0 | Albacete | A Coruña |
| 18:00 CET (UTC+1) | | | | Stadium: Abanca-Riazor |

| 27 January 2019 23 | Sporting Gijón | 1–2 | Deportivo La Coruña | Gijón |
| 18:00 CET (UTC+1) | | | | Stadium: El Molinón |

| 2 February 2019 24 | Deportivo La Coruña | 0–0 | Tenerife | A Coruña |
| 20:30 CET (UTC+1) | | | | Stadium: Abanca-Riazor |

| 10 February 2019 25 | Granada | 0–1 | Deportivo La Coruña | Granada |
| 18:00 CET (UTC+1) | | | | Stadium: Nuevo Los Cármenes |

| 16 February 2019 26 | Deportivo La Coruña | 1–1 | Gimnàstic | A Coruña |
| 16:00 CET (UTC+1) | | | | Stadium: Abanca-Riazor |

| 24 February 2019 27 | Málaga | 0–0 | Deportivo La Coruña | Málaga |
| 18:00 CET (UTC+1) | | | | Stadium: La Rosaleda |

| 4 March 2019 28 | Deportivo La Coruña | 2–2 | Alcorcón | A Coruña |
| 21:00 CET (UTC+1) | | | | Stadium: Abanca-Riazor |

| 10 March 2019 29 | Deportivo La Coruña | 0–1 | Las Palmas | A Coruña |
| 20:00 CET (UTC+1) | | | | Stadium: Abanca-Riazor |

| 17 March 2019 30 | Reus | 0–1 | Deportivo La Coruña | Reus |
| 16:00 CET (UTC+1) | | | | Stadium: Municipal |

| 22 March 2019 31 | Deportivo La Coruña | 0–0 | Almería | A Coruña |
| 21:00 CET (UTC+1) | | | | Stadium: Abanca-Riazor |

| 31 March 2019 32 | Real Oviedo | 1–1 | Deportivo La Coruña | Oviedo |
| 18:00 CEST (UTC+2) | | | | Stadium: Carlos Tartiere |

| 6 April 2019 33 | Deportivo La Coruña | 0–2 | Rayo Majadahonda | A Coruña |
| 16:00 CEST (UTC+2) | | | | Stadium: Abanca-Riazor |

| 13 April 2019 34 | Osasuna | 2–1 | Deportivo La Coruña | Pamplona |
| 18:00 CEST (UTC+2) | | | | Stadium: El Sadar |

| 21 April 2019 35 | Deportivo La Coruña | 1–2 | Extremadura | A Coruña |
| 16:00 CEST (UTC+2) | | | | Stadium: Abanca-Riazor |

| 26 April 2019 36 | Numancia | 1–2 | Deportivo La Coruña | Soria |
| 21:00 CEST (UTC+2) | | | | Stadium: Los Pajaritos |

| 4 May 2019 37 | Real Zaragoza | 0–1 | Deportivo La Coruña | Zaragoza |
| 18:00 CEST (UTC+2) | | | | Stadium: La Romareda |

| 12 May 2019 38 | Deportivo La Coruña | 1–1 | Cádiz | A Coruña |
| 16:00 CEST (UTC+2) | | | | Stadium: Abanca-Riazor |

| 19 May 2019 39 | Lugo | 1–0 | Deportivo La Coruña | Lugo |
| 20:00 CEST (UTC+2) | | | | Stadium: Anxo Carro |

| 27 May 2019 40 | Deportivo La Coruña | 1–0 | Mallorca | A Coruña |
| 21:00 CEST (UTC+2) | | | | Stadium: Abanca-Riazor |

| 4 June 2019 41 | Elche | 0–0 | Deportivo La Coruña | Elche |
| 21:00 CEST (UTC+2) | | | | Stadium: Martínez Valero |

| 8 June 2019 42 | Deportivo La Coruña | 2–0 | Córdoba | A Coruña |
| 20:30 CEST (UTC+2) | | | | Stadium: Abanca-Riazor |
