= Saúl García (footballer, born 1994) =

Spanish footballer (born 1994)

Saúl
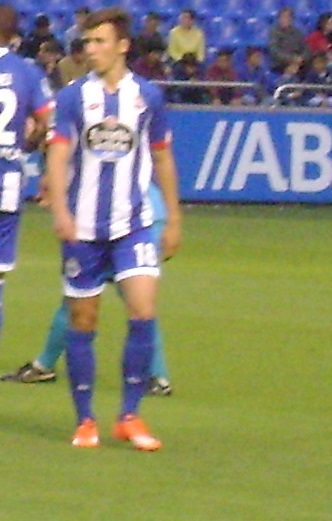
- Saúl with Deportivo La Coruña in 2015

Personal information
- Full name: Saúl García Cabrero
- Date of birth: 9 November 1994 (age 32)
- Place of birth: Vioño de Piélagos, Spain
- Height: 1.83 m (6 ft 0 in)
- Position: Left-back

Team information
- Current team: Racing Ferrol
- Number: 16

Youth career
- 2004–2012: Racing Santander

Senior career*
Years	Team	Apps	(Gls)
2012–2013	Racing B	25	(0)
2013–2015	Racing Santander	66	(1)
2015–2019	Deportivo La Coruña	20	(0)
2016	→ Tenerife (loan)	20	(0)
2016	→ Girona (loan)	6	(0)
2017	→ Mallorca (loan)	11	(0)
2018	→ Numancia (loan)	18	(0)
2019–2022	Alavés	1	(0)
2019–2020	→ Rayo Vallecano (loan)	17	(0)
2020–2021	→ Sporting Gijón (loan)	36	(0)
2022–2025	Racing Santander	81	(1)
2025–	Racing Ferrol	25	(0)
- * Club domestic league appearances and goals as of 9 June 2026

Saúl García Cabrero (born 9 November 1994), simply known as Saúl, is a Spanish professional footballer who plays as a left-back for Primera Federación club Racing Ferrol.

== Football career ==
Born in Vioño de Piélagos, a town in the municipality of Piélagos, Cantabria. Saúl joined Racing de Santander's youth setup in 2004, aged nine, and made his senior debuts with the reserves in the 2012–13 campaign, in Segunda División B. In the 2013 summer, after both first and reserve squads' relegation, he was definitely promoted to the main squad, now in the third level.

Saúl appeared in 34 matches during the 2013–14 season, as the Cantabrian side were promoted to Segunda División at first attempt. On 24 August he played his first match as a professional, starting in a 0–1 away loss against Girona FC.

On 29 December 2014, Saúl signed a four-and-a-half-year contract with La Liga side Deportivo de La Coruña, being loaned to Racing until the end of the campaign. Roughly a year later, after being limited to only two cup matches, he was loaned to CD Tenerife until June.

On 13 August 2016, Saúl signed for Girona FC still in the second level, also in a temporary one-year deal. The following 2 January, after appearing rarely, he moved to RCD Mallorca on loan until June.

On 7 January 2018, after only one first team appearance during the first half of the 2017–18 campaign, Saúl was loaned to second tier club CD Numancia until June. He made his debut for the club three days later at the Santiago Bernabéu Stadium in the Copa del Rey against Real Madrid, providing an assist on a cross for Guillermo's second goal as Numancia drew 2–2, but were eliminated 5–2 on aggregate.

Saúl returned to Dépor for the 2018–19 campaign, being a first-choice ahead of Diego Caballo. On 27 June 2019, he agreed to a four-year contract with Deportivo Alavés in the top tier, but was loaned to second division side Rayo Vallecano on 2 September.

On 28 September 2020, Saúl joined Sporting de Gijón still in division two, on loan for one year. Upon returning to Alavés, he was assigned in the first team squad, and made his top tier debut on 25 September 2021, replacing Luis Rioja late into a 1–0 home win over Atlético Madrid.

On 29 July 2022, Saúl terminated his contract with Alavés, and returned to his first club Racing the following day, on a two-year deal. On 21 August 2025, he terminated his link with the latter.

== Career statistics ==
=== Club ===
As of match played 7 March 2021

Appearances and goals by club, season and competition
Club	Season	League			National Cup		Other		Total	
Club	Season	Division	Apps	Goals	Apps	Goals	Apps	Goals	Apps	Goals
Racing B	2012–13	Segunda División B	25	0	—		—		25	0
Racing Santander	2013–14	Segunda División B	30	1	8	0	4 (Note: Appearance(s) in Promotion Playoffs)	0	42	1
Racing Santander	2014–15	Segunda División	36	0	0	0	—		36	0
Racing Santander	Total		66	1	8	0	4	0	78	1
Deportivo La Coruña	2015–16	La Liga	0	0	2	0	—		2	0
Deportivo La Coruña	2017–18	La Liga	0	0	1	0	—		1	0
Deportivo La Coruña	2018–19	Segunda División	20	0	0	0	4	0	24	0
Deportivo La Coruña	Total		20	0	3	0	4	0	27	0
Tenerife (loan)	2015–16	Segunda División	20	0	0	0	—		20	0
Girona (loan)	2016–17	Segunda División	6	0	1	0	—		7	0
Mallorca (loan)	2016–17	Segunda División	11	0	0	0	—		11	0
Numancia (loan)	2017–18	Segunda División	18	0	1	0	3	0	22	0
Alavés	2019–20	La Liga	0	0	0	0	—		0	0
Rayo Vallecano (loan)	2019–20	Segunda División	17	0	4	0	—		21	0
Sporting Gijón (loan)	2020–21	Segunda División	24	0	3	0	—		27	0
Career total			207	1	20	0	11	0	238	1
