= Guille Rosas =

Spanish footballer

Personal information
- Full name: Guillermo Rosas Alonso
- Date of birth: 17 May 2000 (age 26)
- Place of birth: Gijón, Spain
- Height: 1.74 m (5 ft 9 in)
- Position: Right back

Team information
- Current team: Sporting Gijón
- Number: 2

Youth career
- Xeitosa
- 2009–2019: Sporting Gijón

Senior career*
Years	Team	Apps	(Gls)
2019–2020	Sporting B	13	(2)
2020–	Sporting Gijón	184	(6)

International career^{‡}
2018	Spain U19	1	(0)
2021–2022	Spain U21	2	(0)
- * Club domestic league appearances and goals as of 6 June 2026 ‡ National team caps and goals as of 7 June 2022

Guillermo "Guille" Rosas Alonso (born 17 May 2000) is a Spanish footballer who plays for Sporting de Gijón as a right back.

== Club career ==
Born in Gijón, Asturias, Rosas joined Sporting de Gijón's Mareo in 2009, from Xeitosa CF. On 6 July 2018, while still a youth, he renewed his contract for three years.

Promoted to the reserves for the 2019–20 campaign, Rosas made his senior debut on 16 November 2019, starting in a 1–1 Segunda División B home draw against Celta de Vigo B. He scored his first goals on 15 December, netting a brace in a 6–0 home routing of SCR Peña Deportiva.

Rosas made his first team debut on 11 October 2020, coming on as a second-half substitute for Bogdan Milovanov in a 0–1 away loss against Real Oviedo, which was the 109th Asturian derby. The following 1 February, he renewed his contract until 2025 and was definitely promoted to the main squad, being assigned the number 2 jersey.

== Career statistics ==
=== Club ===
As of 28 July 2021

Appearances and goals by club, season and competition
Club	Season	League			National Cup		Total	
Club	Season	Division	Apps	Goals	Apps	Goals	Apps	Goals
Sporting Gijón B	2019–20	Segunda División B	13	2	—		13	2
Sporting Gijón	2020–21	Segunda División	22	0	0	0	22	0
Career total			35	2	0	0	35	2
