= David Argüelles =

Spanish footballer

Personal information
- Full name: David Argüelles Álvarez
- Date of birth: 10 January 2002 (age 24)
- Place of birth: Gijón, Spain
- Height: 1.75 m (5 ft 9 in)
- Position: Left back

Team information
- Current team: Lealtad
- Number: 18

Youth career
- Colegio La Asunción
- 2012–2020: Sporting Gijón

Senior career*
Years	Team	Apps	(Gls)
2020–2023	Sporting B	60	(4)
2022–2023	Sporting Gijón	3	(0)
2023–2024	Ibiza	6	(0)
2024–2025	Getafe B	14	(0)
2024–2025	Getafe	1	(0)
2025	Ordino	10	(0)
2026–	Lealtad	16	(0)

International career
2020	Spain U18	1	(0)
- * Club domestic league appearances and goals as of 14 May 2026

David Argüelles Álvarez (born 10 January 2002) is a Spanish professional footballer who plays as a left back for Segunda Federación club Lealtad.

== Club career ==
Born in Gijón, Asturias, Argüelles joined Sporting de Gijón's Mareo in 2012, from Colegio de La Asunción. On 6 June 2018, while still a youth, he renewed his contract for a further three years.

Promoted to the reserves in Segunda División B in July 2020, Argüelles made his senior debut on 17 October 2020, starting in a 2–4 home loss against Cultural y Deportiva Leonesa. He scored his first senior goal on 5 September of the following year, netting the opener in a 2–0 Tercera División RFEF away win over CD Covadonga.

Argüelles made his first team debut on 20 March 2022, coming on as a second-half substitute for Pablo García in a 1–1 Segunda División away draw against CD Leganés. On 24 July of the following year, after another two appearances with the main squad, he moved to Primera Federación side UD Ibiza.

On 7 August 2024, after being rarely used, Argüelles joined Getafe CF and was assigned to the B-team in Segunda Federación. He made his first team – and La Liga – debut on 27 October, replacing Álex Sola late into a 1–1 home draw against Valencia CF.
