= Diego Mariño =

Spanish footballer

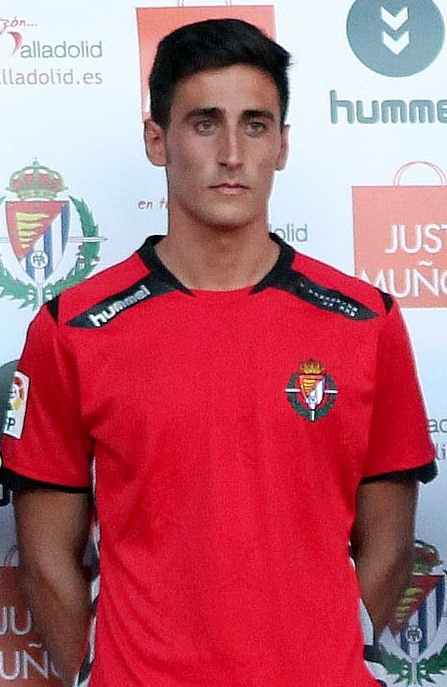
- Mariño with Valladolid in 2014

Personal information
- Full name: Diego Mariño Villar
- Date of birth: 9 May 1990 (age 36)
- Place of birth: Vigo, Spain
- Height: 1.87 m (6 ft 2 in)
- Position: Goalkeeper

Team information
- Current team: Albacete
- Number: 13

Youth career
- Santa Mariña
- 1998–2000: Rápido Bouzas
- 2000–2003: Sárdoma
- 2003–2004: Areosa
- 2004–2008: Villarreal

Senior career*
Years	Team	Apps	(Gls)
2008–2010	Villarreal C	48	(0)
2010–2012	Villarreal B	72	(0)
2012–2013	Villarreal	9	(0)
2013–2015	Valladolid	28	(0)
2014–2015	→ Levante (loan)	32	(0)
2015–2016	Levante	23	(0)
2016–2023	Sporting Gijón	210	(0)
2023–2024	Almería	2	(0)
2024–2025	Granada	23	(0)
2025–	Albacete	20	(0)

International career
2008–2009	Spain U19	6	(0)
2009	Spain U20	1	(0)
2011–2013	Spain U21	6	(0)
2012	Spain U23	3	(0)
- * Club domestic league appearances and goals as of 9 June 2026

Diego Mariño Villar (born 9 May 1990) is a Spanish professional footballer who plays as a goalkeeper for Albacete Balompié.

Brought up at Villarreal, he spent most of his career in the Segunda División with that club's first and second teams as well at Sporting de Gijón, making 312 appearances. He also played 87 La Liga games for Vallladolid, Levante, Sporting and Almería.

Mariño won two European Under-21 Championships with Spain.

== Club career ==
=== Villarreal ===
Born in Vigo, Galicia, Mariño played for Villarreal CF since the age of 14, having already represented four teams as a youth. He made his professional debut in the 2010–11 season, helping the reserves barely avoid relegation from the Segunda División while appearing in 38 games.

Mariño was again first-choice the following campaign, but as the main squad suffered relegation in La Liga the B's were forced to drop down to Segunda División B even though they had finished in a comfortable 12th position. After the departures of longtime incumbent Diego López and 41-year-old César Sánchez (the latter retired), he was promoted to the first team by manager Julio Velázquez – also his boss in the second side.

=== Valladolid and Levante ===
Mariño signed a five-year contract with Real Valladolid on 5 July 2013, with Villarreal retaining an option to buy him back for €300,000. He made his debut in the top flight on 17 August, in a 1–2 home loss against Athletic Bilbao.

On 8 August 2014, Mariño moved to Levante UD of the same league in a season-long loan. On 31 August of the following year, he signed a permanent three-year deal with the club.

=== Sporting Gijón ===
On 1 July 2016, after Levante's relegation, Mariño joined Sporting de Gijón for four years. Understudy to Iván Cuéllar, he made his debut on 26 November in a 2–1 loss at leaders Real Madrid.

On 18 January 2018, Mariño extended his contract until 2022. Between 4 February and 1 April he was unbeaten during 764 minutes and, at the end of the season, he was named Sporting's player of the year.

In August 2019, another year was added to Mariño's contract. He remained first-choice at El Molinón in the ensuing seasons, even after the re-acquisition of Cuéllar in 2021. He suffered a right hamstring injury the following March and was replaced by the latter for ten games as the side successfully fought relegation, returning on 29 May for the final match of the campaign in a 1–0 home defeat against UD Las Palmas.

=== Almería ===
On 26 January 2023, Mariño returned to the top tier after agreeing to an 18-month contract with UD Almería. He made his only appearance of the season on 4 March, as a half-time substitute for the injured Fernando and conceding both goals in a 2–0 home loss to Villarreal.

Mariño spent the 2023–24 campaign as third-choice behind Luís Maximiano and Fernando as they suffered relegation, and left the club in July 2024.

=== Later career ===
On 10 September 2024, Mariño signed a one-year deal with Granada CF. In July 2025, he moved to fellow second-division Albacete Balompié on a two-year contract.

== International career ==
Mariño won his first cap for the Spain under-21 team in 2011. Also that year, he was selected by manager Luis Milla for his UEFA European Championship squad; in the tournament in Denmark, he was a backup to Atlético Madrid's David de Gea as the nation won its third title in the category.

The following year, Mariño repeated the role for the under-23 side in a group-stage exit at the Summer Olympic Games in Great Britain.

== Career statistics ==
As of match played 8 November 2026

Appearances and goals by club, season and competition
Club	Season	League			Cup		Europe		Other		Total	
Club	Season	Division	Apps	Goals	Apps	Goals	Apps	Goals	Apps	Goals	Apps	Goals
Villarreal B	2010–11	Segunda División	38	0	—		—		—		38	0
Villarreal B	2011–12	Segunda División	34	0	—		—		—		34	0
Villarreal B	Total		72	0	—		—		—		72	0
Villarreal	2010–11	La Liga	0	0	0	0	0	0	—		0	0
Villarreal	2011–12	La Liga	0	0	0	0	—		—		0	0
Villarreal	2012–13	Segunda División	9	0	1	0	—		—		10	0
Villarreal	Total		9	0	1	0	0	0	—		10	0
Valladolid	2013–14	La Liga	28	0	0	0	—		—		28	0
Levante (loan)	2014–15	La Liga	32	0	0	0	—		—		32	0
Levante	2015–16	La Liga	23	0	2	0	—		—		25	0
Levante	Levante total		55	0	2	0	—		—		57	0
Sporting Gijón	2016–17	La Liga	2	0	2	0	—		—		4	0
Sporting Gijón	2017–18	Segunda División	41	0	0	0	—		2	0	43	0
Sporting Gijón	2018–19	Segunda División	37	0	1	0	—		—		38	0
Sporting Gijón	2019–20	Segunda División	42	0	0	0	—		—		42	0
Sporting Gijón	2020–21	Segunda División	39	0	0	0	—		—		39	0
Sporting Gijón	2021–22	Segunda División	32	0	4	0	—		—		36	0
Sporting Gijón	2022–23	Segunda División	17	0	3	0	—		—		20	0
Sporting Gijón	Total		210	0	10	0	—		2	0	222	0
Almería	2022–23	La Liga	1	0	0	0	—		—		1	0
Almería	2023–24	La Liga	1	0	1	0	—		—		2	0
Almería	Total		2	0	1	0	—		—		3	0
Granada	2024–25	Segunda División	23	0	1	0	—		—		24	0
Albacete	2025–26	Segunda División	20	0	1	0	—		—		21	0
Albacete	2026–27	Segunda División	9	0	0	0	—		—		9	0
Albacete	Total		29	0	1	0	—		—		30	0
Career total			418	0	16	0	0	0	2	0	446	0

== Honours ==
Spain U21

- UEFA European Under-21 Championship: 2011, 2013

Spain U17

- FIFA U-17 World Cup runner-up: 2007
