= Borja López =

Spanish footballer

Personal information
- Full name: Borja López Menéndez
- Date of birth: 2 February 1994 (age 32)
- Place of birth: Gijón, Spain
- Height: 1.92 m (6 ft 4 in)
- Position: Centre-back

Team information
- Current team: Bellinzona
- Number: 4

Youth career
- Llano 2000
- Xeitosa
- Sporting Gijón

Senior career*
Years	Team	Apps	(Gls)
2011–2013	Sporting Gijón B	10	(0)
2013	Sporting Gijón	19	(0)
2013–2016	Monaco	1	(0)
2014	→ Rayo Vallecano (loan)	3	(0)
2015	→ Deportivo La Coruña (loan)	0	(0)
2015–2016	→ Arouca (loan)	0	(0)
2016–2017	Barcelona B	25	(2)
2016	Barcelona	0	(0)
2017–2019	Hajduk Split	51	(2)
2019–2022	Sporting Gijón	62	(2)
2022–2024	Zulte Waregem	19	(1)
2024	→ Leganés (loan)	1	(0)
2025	Ceuta	2	(0)
2025–	Bellinzona	29	(1)

International career
2012	Spain U18	2	(0)
2013	Spain U19	8	(0)
2012	Spain U20	4	(0)
- * Club domestic league appearances and goals as of 26 May 2026

Borja López Menéndez (Spanish pronunciation: [ˈboɾxa ˈlopeθ]; born 2 February 1994) is a Spanish professional footballer who plays as a central defender for Swiss Challenge League club Bellinzona.

He had two spells with Sporting de Gijón, totalling 81 games and two goals in the Segunda División as well as making three appearances for Rayo Vallecano in La Liga, and one for Barcelona on their way to winning the Copa del Rey in 2016–17. Abroad, he featured in a lone Ligue 1 match for Monaco while also playing in Portugal, Croatia, Belgium and Switzerland.

== Club career ==
=== Sporting Gijón ===
Born in Gijón, Asturias, López was a Sporting de Gijón youth graduate. On 18 December 2011, he made his senior debut for the B side against Getafe CF B.

López made his first-team debut on 1 November 2012, featuring the full 90 minutes in a 1–0 home win over CA Osasuna in the round of 32 of the Copa del Rey. He made his Segunda División debut on the 16th, again starting but in a 2–3 home loss to SD Ponferradina.

On 31 January 2013, López was promoted to the Asturians' main squad alongside Luis Hernández.

=== Monaco ===
On 2 August 2013, López signed a four-year contract with high-spending AS Monaco FC of Ligue 1 for a €2.2 million fee. He played three games for the principality team, his sole in the league being 20 minutes as a substitute for Marcel Tisserand in a 2–2 draw at FC Sochaux-Montbéliard on 20 October.

López was loaned to La Liga's Rayo Vallecano in late January 2014, until the end of the season. He made his debut in the competition on 29 March, starting the 5–0 defeat at Real Madrid.

On 29 January 2015, López moved to Deportivo de La Coruña on loan until June. On 4 July, in the same situation, he joined Portuguese Primeira Liga club F.C. Arouca.

=== Barcelona ===
On 29 January 2016, López joined FC Barcelona on a two-and-a-half-year deal, and was assigned to the reserves in the third division. His only official appearance for the main squad took place on 30 November, when he played the entire 1–1 away draw with Hércules CF in the domestic cup.

=== Later career ===
On 30 June 2017, López switched teams and countries again after signing for HNK Hajduk Split in Croatia. On 6 August 2019, he returned to his first club Sporting on a free transfer.

López agreed to a three-year contract at S.V. Zulte Waregem of the Belgian Pro League in June 2022. On 1 February 2024, after making no appearances in the first half of the campaign, he returned to Spain and its second tier with CD Leganés, on loan. He totalled just 45 minutes for the champions, enough to earn a winners' medal.

On 7 March 2025, López signed a short-term deal with Primera Federación side AD Ceuta FC.

== Career statistics ==
As of match played on 12 December 2023

Appearances and goals by club, season and competition
Club	Season	League			National Cup		League Cup		Continental		Other		Total	
Club	Season	Division	Apps	Goals	Apps	Goals	Apps	Goals	Apps	Goals	Apps	Goals	Apps	Goals
Sporting Gijón B	2010–11	Segunda División B	0	0	—		—		—		—		0	0
Sporting Gijón B	2011–12	Segunda División B	2	0	—		—		—		—		2	0
Sporting Gijón B	2012–13	Segunda División B	8	0	—		—		—		—		8	0
Sporting Gijón B	Total		10	0	—		—		—		—		10	0
Sporting Gijón	2012–13	Segunda División	19	0	2	0	—		—		—		21	0
Monaco	2013–14	Ligue 1	1	0	0	0	1	0	—		—		2	0
Monaco	2014–15	Ligue 1	0	0	0	0	1	0	—		—		1	0
Monaco	Total		1	0	0	0	2	0	—		—		3	0
Rayo Vallecano (loan)	2013–14	La Liga	3	0	0	0	—		—		—		3	0
Deportivo (loan)	2014–15	La Liga	0	0	0	0	—		—		—		0	0
Arouca (loan)	2015–16	Primeira Liga	0	0	0	0	3	0	—		—		3	0
Barcelona B	2015–16	Segunda División B	10	0	—		—		—		—		10	0
Barcelona B	2016–17	Segunda División B	15	2	—		—		—		2 (Note: Appearances in Segunda División B play-offs)	0	17	2
Barcelona B	Total		25	2	—		—		—		2	0	27	2
Barcelona	2016–17	La Liga	0	0	1	0	—		0	0	0	0	1	0
Hajduk Split	2017–18	Croatian Football League	28	2	3	0	—		5 (Note: Appearances in UEFA Europa League)	0	—		36	2
Hajduk Split	2018–19	Croatian Football League	23	0	1	0	—		4	0	—		28	0
Hajduk Split	2019–20	Croatian Football League	0	0	0	0	—		1	0	—		1	0
Hajduk Split	Total		51	2	4	0	—		10	0	—		65	2
Sporting Gijón	2019–20	Segunda División	12	2	1	0	—		—		—		13	2
Sporting Gijón	2020–21	Segunda División	33	0	2	1	—		—		—		35	1
Sporting Gijón	2021–22	Segunda División	17	0	4	0	—		—		—		21	0
Sporting Gijón	Total		62	2	7	1	—		—		—		56	1
Zulte Waregem	2022–23	Belgian Pro League	19	1	2	0	—		—		—		21	1
Zulte Waregem	2023–24	Challenger Pro League	0	0	0	0	—		—		—		0	0
Zulte Waregem	Total		19	1	2	0	—		—		—		21	1
Career total			190	7	12	1	5	0	10	0	2	0	217	8

== Honours ==
Barcelona

- Copa del Rey: 2016–17

Leganés

- Segunda División: 2023–24

Ceuta

- Primera Federación: 2024–25
