= Javier Mecerreyes =

Spanish footballer

Personal information
- Full name: Javier Mecerreyes Campal
- Date of birth: 4 July 2000 (age 26)
- Place of birth: Avilés, Spain
- Height: 1.83 m (6 ft 0 in)
- Position: Midfielder

Team information
- Current team: Real Unión
- Number: 8

Youth career
- Quirinal
- 2013–2019: Sporting Gijón

Senior career*
Years	Team	Apps	(Gls)
2019–2022	Sporting Gijón B	75	(1)
2022	Sporting Gijón	1	(0)
2022–2023	SS Reyes	33	(0)
2023–2025	Avilés	51	(4)
2025–	Real Unión	20	(1)
- * Club domestic league appearances and goals as of 14 May 2026

Javier Mecerreyes Campal (born 4 July 2000) is a Spanish professional footballer who plays as a midfielder for Segunda Federación club Real Unión.

== Career ==
Born in Avilés, Asturias, Mecerreyes joined Sporting de Gijón's Mareo in 2013, from CD Quirinal. On 21 June 2019, he signed a three-year contract with the club, being promoted to the reserve team in Segunda División B.

Mecerreyes made his senior debut on 22 September 2021, starting in a 0–0 away draw against Racing de Ferrol. He scored his first goal on 15 December, netting the B's second in a 6–0 home routing of SCR Peña Deportiva.

Mecerreyes made his first team debut on 29 May 2022, coming on as a second-half substitute for fellow youth graduate Gaspar Campos in a 0–1 Segunda División home loss against UD Las Palmas.
