= Álex Zalaya =

Spanish footballer

Personal information
- Full name: Pedro Alejandro Zalaya Galardón
- Date of birth: 29 April 1998 (age 28)
- Place of birth: Zaragoza, Spain
- Height: 1.84 m (6 ft 0 in)
- Position: Centre-back

Team information
- Current team: Goa

Youth career
- –2016: Zaragoza

Senior career*
Years	Team	Apps	(Gls)
2016–2018	Zaragoza B	56	(1)
2016	Zaragoza	0	(0)
2018–2021	Sporting B	49	(3)
2021	Sporting Gijón	0	(0)
2021–2022	Cornellà	36	(1)
2022–2023	Barcelona B	22	(0)
2023	Real Murcia	8	(0)
2024	Atlético Baleares	11	(0)
2024–2025	Ourense CF	31	(2)
2025–2026	Racing Ferrol	24	(4)
2026–	Goa	2	(0)

International career
2014	Spain U17	2	(0)
2016–2017	Spain U19	5	(0)
- * Club domestic league appearances and goals as of 28 October 2026

Pedro Alejandro 'Álex' Zalaya Galardón (born 29 April 1998) is a Spanish professional footballer who plays as a centre-back for Indian Super League club Goa.

== Football career ==
Born in Zaragoza, Aragón, Zalaya represented Real Zaragoza as a youth. He made his senior debut for the reserves on 28 August 2016, starting in a 4–2 Tercera División home win against CD Belchite 97.

Zalaya made his professional debut on 7 September 2016, coming on as a second half substitute for fellow youth graduate Jorge Pombo in a 1–2 home loss against Real Valladolid, for the season's Copa del Rey. On 6 June of the following year, after achieving promotion to Segunda División B, he was promoted to the main squad.

On 31 July 2018, Zalaya moved to another reserve team, Sporting de Gijón B in the third division. On 17 August 2021, he agreed to a contract with Primera División RFEF side UE Cornellà.

On 1 September 2022, Zalaya joined FC Barcelona Atlètic on a one-year contract.
