= Jean-Sylvain Babin =

French footballer (born 1986)

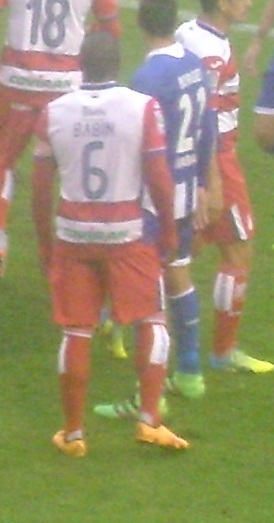
- Babin with Granada in 2016

Personal information
- Full name: Jean-Sylvain Claude Emmanuel Babin
- Date of birth: 14 October 1986 (age 40)
- Place of birth: Corbeil-Essonnes, France
- Height: 1.81 m (5 ft 11 in)
- Position: Centre-back

Team information
- Current team: Avilés
- Number: 5

Youth career
- Châteauroux

Senior career*
Years	Team	Apps	(Gls)
2003–2006	Châteauroux B		
2004–2008	Châteauroux	22	(0)
2007–2008	→ Martigues (loan)	32	(0)
2008–2010	Lucena	54	(5)
2010–2014	Alcorcón	146	(11)
2014–2016	Granada	59	(4)
2016–2022	Sporting Gijón	163	(8)
2017–2018	→ Maccabi Tel Aviv (loan)	32	(0)
2022–2024	Alcorcón	62	(3)
2024–	Avilés	69	(4)

International career
2013–2021	Martinique	16	(1)
- * Club domestic league appearances and goals as of 9 June 2026

Jean-Sylvain Claude Emmanuel Babin (born 14 October 1986) is a professional footballer who plays as a centre-back for Primera Federación club Real Avilés.

He all but spent his professional career in Spain, appearing for Granada and Sporting de Gijón in La Liga and Alcorcón and Sporting in the Segunda División.

Born in metropolitan France, Babin represented the Martinique national team at international level.

== Club career ==
=== France ===
Born in Corbeil-Essonnes, Essonne, Babin graduated from LB Châteauroux's youth academy, and made his senior debut with their B team. He started playing as a professional in the 2003–04 season, appearing with the main squad in Ligue 2.

Babin was loaned to FC Martigues on 30 August 2007. After his contract expired, he left Châteauroux.

=== Spain ===
On 14 July 2008, Babin moved to Spain and joined Lucena CF in Segunda División B. He was regularly used by the Andalusians during his stint, being an important defensive unit in the 2009–10 campaign.

On 2 August 2010, Babin signed with AD Alcorcón, recently promoted to Segunda División. He made his debut for the Madrid club late in the month, starting in a 1–1 away draw against Albacete Balompié.

Babin scored his first goal for the Alfareros on 22 October 2011, closing the 2–1 home win over Recreativo de Huelva. He added a further four during the season, as his team missed out on promotion in the play-offs.

On 9 June 2014, Babin signed a four-year contract with Granada CF. He made his debut in La Liga on 23 August, and scored to help the hosts come from behind and win 2–1 against Deportivo de La Coruña.

On 4 August 2016, Babin agreed to a three-year deal with fellow top-tier side Sporting de Gijón. He scored once in 22 appearances in his first year, as the Asturians were relegated after finishing third-bottom.

Babin was loaned to Maccabi Tel Aviv F.C. of the Israeli Premier League in September 2017; the previous month, he had seen his request for an improved contract denied and was also transfer-listed.

On 24 June 2022, Babin returned to Alcorcón after eight years. He scored on his debut on 28 August, opening the 1–1 draw at Pontevedra CF in the Primera Federación. He won promotion at the end of the season, being immediately relegated in 2024.

Babin moved down to Segunda Federación for the 2024–25 campaign, with the 37-year-old joining Real Avilés Industrial CF on a two-year deal.

== International career ==
Babin chose to represent Martinique internationally. He earned his first cap during the 2013 CONCACAF Gold Cup, playing the full 90 minutes and helping to a 1–0 group-stage defeat of Canada.

== Career statistics ==
As of 1 June 2016
Scores and results list Martinique's goal tally first, score column indicates score after each Babin goal.

List of international goals scored by Jean-Sylvain Babin
No.	Date	Venue	Opponent	Score	Result	Competition
1	1 June 2016	Pierre-Aliker, Fort-de-France, Martinique	Guadeloupe	2–0	2–0	2017 Caribbean Cup qualification

== Honours ==
Maccabi Tel Aviv

- Toto Cup: 2017–18
