= Pedro Díaz (footballer, born 1998) =

Spanish footballer (born 1998)

Personal information
- Full name: Pedro Díaz Fanjul
- Date of birth: 5 June 1998 (age 28)
- Place of birth: Siero, Spain
- Height: 1.80 m (5 ft 11 in)
- Position: Midfielder

Team information
- Current team: Rayo Vallecano
- Number: 4

Youth career
- 2012–2014: Astur
- 2014–2015: Sporting Gijón

Senior career*
Years	Team	Apps	(Gls)
2015–2019	Sporting B	134	(12)
2017–2023	Sporting Gijón	143	(14)
2023–2024	Bordeaux	38	(7)
2024–	Rayo Vallecano	67	(3)

International career
2016	Spain U18	2	(0)
2016	Spain U20	5	(0)
- * Club domestic league appearances and goals as of 24 October 2026

Pedro Díaz Fanjul (born 5 June 1998) is a Spanish professional footballer who plays as a midfielder for La Liga club Rayo Vallecano.

== Club career ==
=== Sporting Gijón ===
Born in Siero, Asturias, Díaz was a Sporting de Gijón youth graduate. He made his senior debut with the reserves on 8 March 2015 at the age of just 16, starting in a 1–3 Segunda División B away loss against Racing de Ferrol.

Díaz renewed his contract until 2019 on 30 December 2015. He scored his first senior goal four days later, netting the last in a 2–0 away win against CD Guijuelo.

Díaz made his first team debut on 6 September 2017, starting in a 1–0 win at CF Reus Deportiu, for the season's Copa del Rey. Ahead of the 2019–20 campaign, he was definitely promoted to the main squad.

Díaz scored his first professional goal on 1 September 2019, netting the opener in a 2–0 home win over Albacete Balompié. On 8 March 2021, already established as a regular starter, he renewed his contract until 2025.

=== Bordeaux ===
On 3 August 2023, Sporting announced that they reached an agreement with Ligue 2 side Bordeaux for the transfer of Díaz.

=== Rayo Vallecano ===
On 5 August 2024, Díaz signed for La Liga club Rayo Vallecano on a three-year contract.

== Career statistics ==
As of match played 24 October 2026

Appearances and goals by club, season and competition
Club	Season	League			Cup		Europe		Other		Total	
Club	Season	Division	Apps	Goals	Apps	Goals	Apps	Goals	Apps	Goals	Apps	Goals
Sporting B	2014–15	Segunda División B	5	0	—		—		—		5	0
Sporting B	2015–16	Segunda División B	27	1	—		—		—		27	1
Sporting B	2016–17	Segunda División B	36	3	—		—		—		36	3
Sporting B	2017–18	Segunda División B	35	3	—		—		4 (Note: Appearances in Segunda División B play-offs)	0	39	3
Sporting B	2018–19	Segunda División B	31	5	—		—		—		31	5
Sporting B	Total		134	12	—		—		4	0	138	12
Sporting Gijón	2017–18	La Liga	0	0	1	0	—		—		1	0
Sporting Gijón	2018–19	Segunda División	3	0	1	0	—		—		4	0
Sporting Gijón	2019–20	Segunda División	28	3	0	0	—		—		28	3
Sporting Gijón	2020–21	Segunda División	37	3	1	0	—		—		38	3
Sporting Gijón	2021–22	Segunda División	42	4	2	0	—		—		44	4
Sporting Gijón	2022–23	Segunda División	33	4	3	0	—		—		36	4
Sporting Gijón	Total		143	14	8	0	—		—		151	14
Bordeaux	2023–24	Ligue 2	38	7	3	0	—		—		41	7
Rayo Vallecano	2024–25	La Liga	26	3	3	1	—		—		29	4
Rayo Vallecano	2025–26	La Liga	34	3	1	1	12 (Note: Appearances in UEFA Conference League)	0	—		47	4
Rayo Vallecano	2026–27	La Liga	7	0	0	0	—		—		7	0
Rayo Vallecano	Total		67	6	4	2	12	0	—		83	8
Career total			382	39	15	2	12	0	4	0	413	41

== Honours ==
Rayo Vallecano

- UEFA Conference League runner-up: 2025–26
