= Marcos Trabanco =

Spanish footballer

Personal information
- Full name: Marcos García Trabanco
- Date of birth: 27 February 2001 (age 25)
- Place of birth: Gijón, Spain
- Height: 1.77 m (5 ft 10 in)
- Positions: Right back; winger

Team information
- Current team: Caudal

Youth career
- Inmaculada
- Sporting Gijón

Senior career*
Years	Team	Apps	(Gls)
2020–2023	Sporting B	79	(2)
2021	Sporting Gijón	1	(0)
2023–2024	Avilés	29	(0)
2024–	Caudal	5	(0)
- * Club domestic league appearances and goals as of 6 October 2024

Marcos García Trabanco (born 27 February 2001) is a Spanish professional footballer who plays as either a right back or a right winger for Caudal.

== Club career ==
Born in Gijón, Asturias, Trabanco joined Sporting de Gijón's Mareo from Colegio de la Inmaculada. On 3 July 2020, after finishing his formation, he renewed his contract with the club and was promoted to the reserves in Segunda División B.

Trabanco made his senior debut on 17 October 2020, starting in a 4–2 home loss against Cultural y Deportiva Leonesa. He was regularly used during the campaign, as the B-team suffered relegation.

Trabanco made his first team debut on 7 January 2021, starting in a 1–0 away win over SD Amorebieta, for the season's Copa del Rey. He scored his first goal on 12 September, netting the B's winner in a 3–2 Tercera División RFEF home success over L'Entregu CF.

Trabanco made his professional debut on 19 November 2022, starting in a 2–2 home draw against CD Leganés in the Segunda División. The following 11 July, he moved to Segunda Federación side Real Avilés CF.
