= Aitor García =

Spanish footballer

Personal information
- Full name: Aitor García Flores
- Date of birth: 25 March 1994 (age 32)
- Place of birth: Gibraleón, Spain
- Height: 1.73 m (5 ft 8 in)
- Position: Winger

Team information
- Current team: Recreativo
- Number: 17

Youth career
- Recreativo

Senior career*
Years	Team	Apps	(Gls)
2011–2013	Recreativo B	26	(9)
2012–2014	Recreativo	6	(1)
2013	→ Celta B (loan)	12	(2)
2013–2014	→ Celta B (loan)	25	(5)
2014–2015	Toledo	14	(3)
2015	Almería B	9	(0)
2015–2016	Mérida	28	(6)
2016–2019	Cádiz	47	(5)
2018–2019	→ Rayo Majadahonda (loan)	22	(4)
2019	→ Sporting Gijón (loan)	11	(1)
2019–2023	Sporting Gijón	145	(21)
2023–2024	Juárez	45	(9)
2025	Al-Khor	9	(0)
2025–2026	Atromitos	11	(0)
2026–	Recreativo	11	(4)
- * Club domestic league appearances and goals as of 7 May 2026

Aitor García Flores (born 25 March 1994) is a Spanish footballer who plays as a winger and attacking midfielder for Segunda Federación club Recreativo.

== Club career ==
Born in Gibraleón, Province of Huelva, García started playing as a senior with the reserve side in Tercera División, in 2011. On 28 January of the following year he made his debut with the Andalusians' first team, coming on as a substitute for Javi Álamo in the 79th minute of an away game against Real Murcia and scoring the last goal of the Segunda División match (3–0).

On 20 June 2012 García signed a new four-year contract with the Andalusians, and was loaned to Celta de Vigo B in January 2013, with the deal being renewed in July. On 14 August 2014 he rescinded his link with Recre, and joined Segunda División B's CD Toledo six days later.

On 25 January 2015, García signed a three-year deal with fellow league club UD Almería B. On 5 August he rescinded his contract, and moved to Mérida AD just hours later.

On 14 July 2016, after scoring a career-best six goals during the campaign, García signed a three-year contract with Cádiz CF in the second tier. On 20 July of the following year, he extended his contract until 2020.

On 6 August 2018, García was loaned to fellow second division side CF Rayo Majadahonda, for one year. The following 31 January, he moved to Sporting de Gijón in the same category, also in a temporary deal.
