= Bohdan Milovanov =

Ukrainian footballer (born 1998)

Personal information
- Date of birth: 19 April 1998 (age 28)
- Place of birth: Luhansk, Ukraine
- Height: 1.78 m (5 ft 10 in)
- Position: Right-back

Team information
- Current team: Gnistan (on loan from Sirius)
- Number: 19

Youth career
- Atlético Madrid
- Alcobendas
- 2015: Getafe

Senior career*
Years	Team	Apps	(Gls)
2015	Alcobendas	12	(0)
2015–2017	Getafe B	15	(0)
2017–2018	SS Reyes	22	(1)
2018–2021	Sporting Gijón B	44	(1)
2020–2022	Sporting Gijón	60	(1)
2022–2024	Arouca	37	(0)
2025–	Sirius	15	(0)
2026–	→ Gnistan (loan)	12	(2)

International career^{‡}
2019–2020	Ukraine U21	7	(1)
- * Club domestic league appearances and goals as of 13 November 2026 ‡ National team caps and goals as of 6 January 2022

Bohdan Milovanov (Ukrainian: Богдан Мілованов; born 19 April 1998) is a Ukrainian footballer who plays as a right-back for Veikkausliiga club Gnistan, on loan from Sirius.

== Club career ==
Born in Luhansk, Milovanov moved to the Community of Madrid at early age and made his senior debut with Alcobendas CF during the 2014–15 season, in Tercera División. In July 2015, he moved to Getafe CF and returned to youth football.

On 10 August 2017, after being sparingly used by Getafe's reserves, Milovanov signed for Segunda División B side UD San Sebastián de los Reyes. On 9 July of the following year, he joined another reserve team, Sporting de Gijón B also in the third division.

Milovanov made his debut for the Asturians' first team on 14 January 2020, starting in a 1–0 home win against Elche CF in the Segunda División championship.

In January 2025, Milovanov trial trained with Allsvenskan club IK Sirius, and on 1 February, he signed with the club, signing af contract until 2027.
