= Pablo García (footballer, born 2000) =

Spanish footballer

Personal information
- Full name: Pablo García Carrasco
- Date of birth: 5 June 2000 (age 26)
- Place of birth: Gijón, Spain
- Height: 1.78 m (5 ft 10 in)
- Position: Left-back

Team information
- Current team: Sporting Gijón
- Number: 3

Youth career
- 2010–2019: Sporting Gijón

Senior career*
Years	Team	Apps	(Gls)
2019–2021	Sporting Gijón B	24	(2)
2020–	Sporting Gijón	108	(1)
2022–2023	→ Alcorcón (loan)	31	(6)
- * Club domestic league appearances and goals as of 14:05, 7 July 2026 (UTC)

Pablo García Carrasco (born 5 June 2000) is a Spanish professional footballer who plays as a left-back for Segunda División club Sporting de Gijón.

== Club career ==
Born in Gijón, Asturias, García joined Sporting de Gijón's Mareo in 2010, aged 10. He made his senior debut with the reserves on 1 September 2019, coming on as a second-half substitute and scoring his team's fourth goal in a 5–0 Segunda División B home rout of UD San Sebastián de los Reyes.

García played his first match as a professional on 12 September 2020, starting in a 1–0 home win against UD Logroñés in the Segunda División. On 6 August of the following year, he renewed his contract until 2025.

On 7 August 2022, García moved to Primera Federación side AD Alcorcón on loan for the season. He contributed a career-best six goals to their return to the second tier after one year, adding two assists.

García scored his first goal for Sporting on 15 March 2026, closing the 4–1 home victory over CD Castellón; he dedicated it to his maternal grandfather Guillermo, who died one week earlier.
