= Christian Joel =

Cuban footballer (born 1999)

Personal information
- Full name: Christian Joel Sánchez Leal
- Date of birth: 9 July 1999 (age 27)
- Place of birth: Havana, Cuba
- Height: 1.93 m (6 ft 4 in)
- Position: Goalkeeper

Team information
- Current team: União Leiria

Youth career
- 2011–2017: Sporting Gijón

Senior career*
Years	Team	Apps	(Gls)
2017–2021	Sporting B	45	(0)
2019–2026	Sporting Gijón	16	(0)
2021–2022	→ AEK Larnaca (loan)	14	(0)
2022–2023	→ Celta B (loan)	24	(0)
2016–	União Leiria	0	(0)
- * Club domestic league appearances and goals as of 6 June 206

Christian Joel Sánchez Leal (born 9 July 1999) is a Cuban professional footballer who plays as a goalkeeper for Portuguese club UD Leiria.

== Club career ==
Born in Havana, Christian Joel moved to Spain at early age and joined Sporting de Gijón's youth setup at the age of 12. On 20 August 2017, he made his senior debut with the reserves by starting in a 1–0 Segunda División B home defeat of SD Gernika Club.

Christian Joel renewed his contract until 2021 on 25 January 2018, but spent the campaign as a backup to Dani Martín. He made his first team debut on 8 June of the following year, starting in a 1–0 home win against Cádiz CF in the Segunda División championship.

On 27 August 2021, Christian Joel extended his contract until 2026, and was loaned to Cypriot First Division side AEK Larnaca FC for one year. On 19 August of the following year, he moved to Celta de Vigo B also in a temporary one-year deal.

On 9 July 2026, Christian Joel agreed to a one-year deal with Liga Portugal 2 side UD Leiria, after his contract with Sporting expired.
