= Escuela de Fútbol de Mareo =

Training ground of Sporting de Gijón

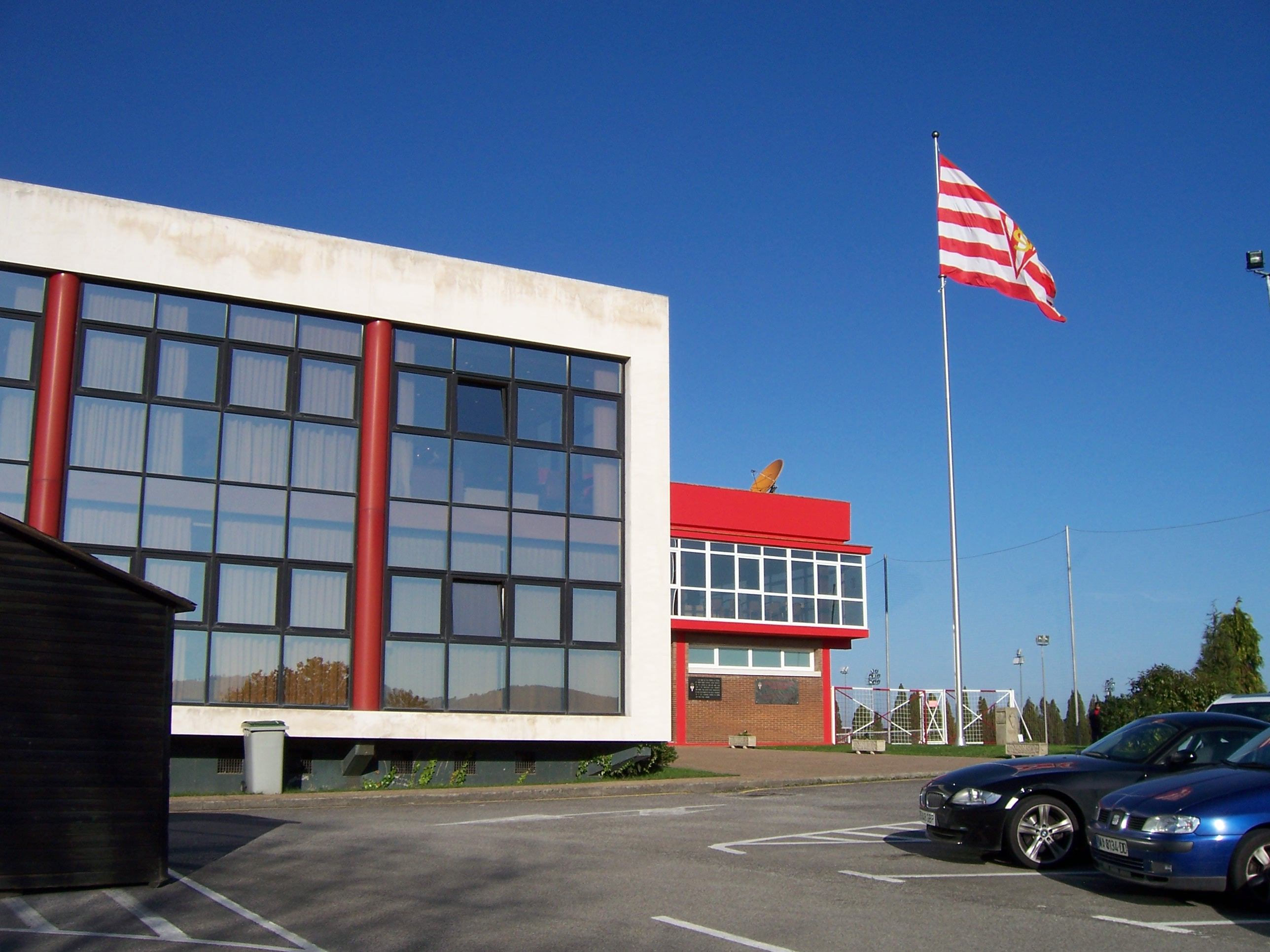
- Interactive map of Escuela de Fútbol de Mareo
- Location: Gijón; Asturias, Spain
- Coordinates: 43°29′53″N 05°40′50″W
- Owner: Gijón City Council
- Type: Football training ground

Construction
- Opened: 28 March 1978
- Cost: 50 million pesetas

Tenant
- Sporting de Gijón (training) (1978–present)

Website
- Escuela de Fútbol de Mareo

The Escuela de Fútbol de Mareo, officially Escuela de Fútbol Ángel Viejo Feliú, is the training ground and academy base of the Spanish football club Sporting de Gijón. It was officially opened in 1978 and used by the main team and the youth teams of the club. The designer was architect Miguel Díaz Negrete.

Covering an area of 112,000 m^{2} in the parish of Leorio, Gijón, it is used since 1978 for youth and senior teams trainings.

== Facilities ==
- Campo Pepe Ortiz with 680 seats at its main tribune and a capacity for 3,000 people, is the home stadium of Sporting de Gijón B, the under-19 team and the women's team.
- 3 regular-sized natural grass training pitches.
- 3 regular-sized artificial turf training pitches.
- 1 artificial turf pitch for 8-a-side football.
- 1 pitch for goalkeepers training.
- 1 futsal court.
- 2 sand pitches, for beach football and footvolley.
- Service centre with gymnasium.

== History ==
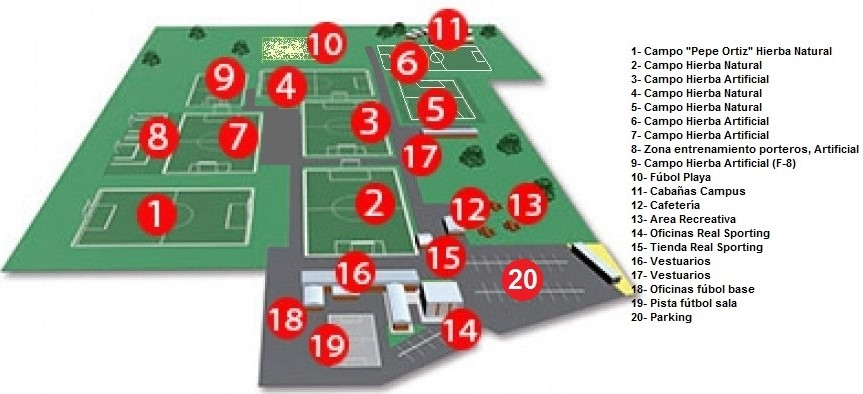
Map of Mareo

In January 1974, Sporting de Gijón club board led by Ángel Viejo Feliú appointed Yugoslavian Branko Zebec as head coach, but he left the city after few days due to the precarious resources. After this circumstance, the club starts a plan for purchasing terrains where to build the appropriate installations for a La Liga team. The income from the transfer of Ignacio Churruca to Athletic Bilbao, 50 million pesetas, were destinated entirely for this purpose. Finally, the Escuela de Fútbol de Mareo was inaugurated on 28 March 1978.

On 1 August 2001, due to the deep financial crisis of Sporting Gijón, president Juan Arango sold the terrains to the Gijón City Hall by €12 million. After this transfer, Sporting Gijón signed an agreement for using the installations on loan.

On 25 June 2017, the Campo Pepe Ortiz, main pitch of the academy, beat its attendance record with about 4,000 people at the last round of the 2017 Tercera División play-offs against SD Beasain.

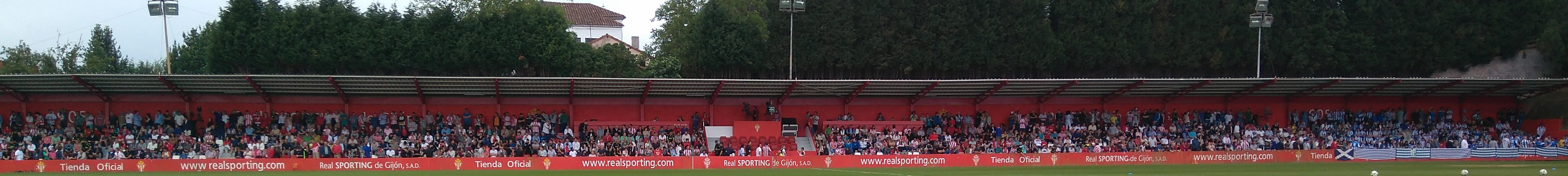
Tribune of Campo Pepe Ortiz, during the attendance record match against SD Beasain.
