= 2018–19 Sporting de Gijón season =

Real Sporting
2018–19 season
- President: Javier Fernández
- Head coach: José Alberto
- Stadium: El Molinón
- Segunda División: 9th
- Copa del Rey: Round of 16
- Top goalscorer: League: Uroš Đurđević (11 goals); All: Uroš Đurđević (12 goals)
- Highest home attendance: 26,748; Real Sporting 1–0 Oviedo (24 March 2019)
- Lowest home attendance: 8,600; Real Sporting 1–0 Cádiz (8 June 2019)
- Average home league attendance: 18,384
Home colours	Away colours	Third colours

The 2018–19 season was Real Sporting's 113th season in existence and the club's 47th season in the second flight of Spanish football, the second one since its last relegation. It covers a period from 1 July 2018 to 30 June 2019.

== Season overview ==
=== Pre-season ===
On 12 June 2018, Alberto Lora announced he would leave Real Sporting after spending 12 seasons in the club. The board of directors, players and supporters went to his farewell.

Two days later, Miguel Torrecilla, director of football, announced that after the great success of the reserve team in the previous season, six players would promote to the first team: Nacho Méndez, Juan Rodríguez, Dani Martín, Isma Cerro, Cristian Salvador and Álvaro Traver.

On 4 July 2018, Portuguese midfielder André Sousa became the first new player of the season. He came loaned from Belenenses, with a buy-option for Real Sporting. Five days later, Isma López rescinded with the club for signing with Cypriot AC Omonia. The Navarrese player left the team after five seasons with 130 league games played and eight goals scored.

Also in that week, Carlos Castro was transferred to Mallorca for an undisclosed fee.

On 11 July, right back Francisco Molinero arrived to Gijón from Getafe for signing with the club the next day. Only one day later, another new right back arrived to Mareo: Portuguese André Geraldes came loaned from Sporting CP after spending the last season with André Sousa at Belenenses.

On 18 July, Real Sporting played their first match of the preseason at Villaviciosa. Despite receiving a first goal, they beat homers Lealtad by 2–1. Gorka Santamaría, signed for the reserves, and Pablo Fernández scored the two goals.

On 23 July, the club signed Finnish international winger Robin Lod for two seasons. Two days later, after requesting to leave the club for playing in La Liga, Sergio Álvarez was transferred to Eibar. The Asturian midfielder spent 13 seasons in the club.

Before these two transfers, Diego Mariño received the Molinón de Plata award for the best player of the previous season.

On 27 July, Real Sporting beat Langreo by 2–0 in a match where striker Neftali Manzambi, that is in the club as a test player, made a notable performance.

On 2 August, the day after a win against Cultural Leonesa, Real Sporting announced French defender Mathieu Peybernes, who came on loan from Lorient. Five days later, Manzambi agreed to remain in the B-side with a one-year loan from Basel and on the next day, Ghanaian Isaac Cofie signed a two-year contract with the club.

On 14 August, Federico Barba left Real Sporting for coming back to Italy after Chievo Verona paid the termination clause of the player. One day later, English striker Nick Blackman joined the club on a season-long loan from Derby County.

=== August ===
On 18 August, as in the previous season, Real Sporting started the season with a draw at Alcorcón. This time, Real Sporting rescued one point thanks to a great shot of André Sousa in the 93rd minute. 17-year-old player Pelayo Morilla made his debut with the first side.

After this match, left back Javi Noblejas signed for the club, as Serbian striker Uroš Đurđević, who, for a fee of about €2 million became the most expensive transfer in the club's history, and winger Álvaro, loaned from Getafe after he could not sign with Málaga, that had problems their salary cap.

The second match of the season was played on 26 August, and Real Sporting defeated Gimnàstic by 2–0 with goals of Hernán Santana and Robin Lod, both players scoring for the first time with the Asturian team.

=== September ===
Real Sporting continued unbeaten after the third round, by beating debutants Extremadura 2–0. This win allowed the team to reach the direct promotion positions for the first time in the season.

The first loss arrived on 9 September, at Riazor, with a goal of Pablo Marí for Deportivo La Coruña in the 94th minute, in a very criticized match by the local media due to not shooting on target in the whole game. Robin Lod, called up for playing the UEFA Nations League with Finland, missed the game. Rubén Baraja and the rest of the technical staff were worried about his presence with the national team as he was recently recovered from an injury.

After the disappointment at Coruña, Real Sporting faced the Copa del Rey and beat Numancia by 1–2. Pelayo Morilla, with only 17 years old, netted the second goal for the team. However, in the league match played four days later at El Molinón, the rojiblancos only could earn one point after a 1–1 due to a controversial goal for Numancia, where an offside was claimed.

On 22 September, Sporting extended their streak without wins with a 1–0 loss at El Sadar against Osasuna. The performance was again heavily criticized, as after the match at Riazor, due to not shooting again on target during the 90 minutes.

The month of September ended with a 1–0 win against Las Palmas, and showed the differences of the team depending on playing at home and away.

=== October ===
October was not a good month for Real Sporting. They started it with a loss at Wanda Metropolitano against Rayo Majadahonda in a match where the first shouts of "Baraja out" were heard. The bad streak continued at home, where the team only earned one point against Reus Deportiu thanks to a penalty kick scored by Carlos Carmona in the 93rd minute (previously, Uroš Đurđević missed another one) and the shouts against Rubén Baraja continued.

In a decisive week for the coach, Real Sporting won in the third round of the 2018–19 Copa del Rey after a penalty shootout against Rayo Majadahonda. Ten players that previously played for the B-side participated in the match. The bad streak continued at home with a goalless draw against Córdoba. Again, people protested against the board of directors and the manager.

=== November ===
The streak without winning continued at Estadio Mediterráneo, where Real Sporting lost 1–2 to Almería in a match with a controversial penalty kick for the homers to tie the game and a not allowed legal goal of Cristian Salvador with 1–1 in the scoreboard, and just before the second goal for Almería.

Before the Asturian derby, Real Sporting saved one point in the 94th minute in their home match against Málaga, that ended with a 2–2 draw. Again, the crowd shouted against Baraja and shouted the name of José Alberto, manager of the B-side. Finally, Baraja was sacked after losing the derby against Oviedo and José Alberto took the helm of the team. In that match, Isma Cerro suffered an injury that forced him to miss the rest of the season.

In his first match, José Alberto managed the team to the club's first win ever at Granada, beating the homers by 2–1 with a free kick shot of Álvaro Traver in the 92nd minute.

=== December ===
The month started with a 2–1 win at El Molinón against Tenerife, in the debut of José Alberto at home. Finally and after 14 league matches, Uroš Đurđević scored his first league goal with the club.

Five days later, Real Sporting qualified for the first time in ten years to the Copa del Rey's round of 16 after eliminating Eibar thanks to the 2–2 draw at Ipurua. The rojiblancos were the only non-first-tier team to qualify to this round.

José Alberto ended the year unbeaten after achieving one more win against Mallorca and a goalless draw at Lugo.

=== January ===
On 6 January, Real Sporting lost its first match at home, after the come back of Zaragoza at El Molinón. Three days later, the team would achieve another win at the Copa del Rey, by defeating top-tier Valencia by 2–1. Javi Noblejas scored his first goal with Real Sporting and Nick Blackman made a header-goal for the win. However, the team would be eliminated after being defeated 0–3 at Mestalla.

The month of January ended with three new signs and one player leaving the club on loan made during the winter transfer window. Ivi, Álex Alegría and Aitor García signed for the club while Neftali Manzambi was loaned to Córdoba after transferring the player from Basel.

=== February ===
With the three new signs making their debut with Real Sporting, the team started the month by widely beating Extremadura at Almendralejo, with Đurđević scoring a brace. However, despite this good match, the month would be disastrous after losing the next three matches with Osasuna, Las Palmas, Rayo Majadahonda, being the team, specially the defense, strongly criticized.

=== March ===
March would see the club's reaction to the bad streak starting with an away win against Numancia, followed by three more, specially important the one against Oviedo at the Asturian derby thanks to an own goal of Christian Fernández. Sporting would progress slowly positions in the table as they only earn one point in their visit to Málaga.

=== April ===
Real Sporting recovered the winning streak in the next week at Tenerife and at home against Granada with two goals of Uroš Đurđević. In the match against Granada, the Serbian striker would score the fastest goal in the club's history after earning the only goal of the match with only ten seconds played.

These would be the end of the winning streak for starting a last outrageous break, with two draws against last qualified Gimnàstic and Elche, despite a starting goal of Jean-Sylvain Babin.

=== May and June ===
A loss in the last play of the match against Mallorca, where Diego Mariño got injured for the rest of the season, would practically mean the end of the possibilities of Real Sporting to qualify for the playoffs, and these would definitively disappear with a goalless home draw against Lugo and two consecutive losses at Zaragoza and against Albacete.

The season finished with a 1–0 win against Cádiz, with a goal of Nacho Méndez. This was the last match of captain Roberto Canella, who would leave Real Sporting after spending twelve seasons in the club. Just after the match, Jean-Sylvain Babin announced he would extend his contract for three more years, being this confirmed by the club the next day.

== Players ==
=== Current squad ===
N	Pos.	Nat.	Name	Age	Since	App	Goals	Ends	Transfer fee	Notes
1	GK	(Spain)	Dani Martín	20	2018	0	0	2021	Youth system	
2	DF	(Spain)	Francisco Molinero	33	2018	0	0	2020	Free	
3	DF	(Spain)	Javi Noblejas	26	2018	0	0	2019	Free	
4	DF	(Spain)	Juan Rodríguez	24	2018	12	0	2020	Youth system	
5	MF	(Ghana)	Isaac Cofie	27	2018	0	0	2020	Free	
6	DF	(Martinique)	Jean-Sylvain Babin	32	2016	22	1	2019	Free	Played internationally with Martinique.
7	MF	(Spain)	Aitor García	25	2018	0	0	2019	Free	
8	MF	(Spain)	Hernán Santana	28	2018	9	1	2021	Free	
9	FW	(England)	Nick Blackman	29	2018	0	0	2019	Free	
10	MF	(Spain)	Carlos Carmona	31	2012	192	34	2021	Free	
11	FW	(Spain)	Ivi	25	2018	0	0	2019	Free	
12	MF	(Spain)	Álvaro	24	2018	0	0	2019	Free	
13	GK	(Spain)	Diego Mariño	29	2016	44	0	2022	Undisclosed	
14	MF	(Spain)	Nacho Méndez	21	2018	11	0	2021	Youth system	
15	DF	(Spain)	Roberto Canella	31	2008	287	8	2019	Youth system	
16	MF	(Portugal)	André Sousa	28	2018	0	0	2019	Free	
17	MF	(Finland)	Robin Lod	26	2018	0	0	2020	Free	
18	DF	(Portugal)	André Geraldes	28	2018	0	0	2019	Free	
19	DF	(France)	Mathieu Peybernes	28	2018	0	0	2019	Free	
20	MF	(Spain)	Cristian Salvador	24	2018	0	0	2021	Youth system	
21	MF	(Spain)	Álvaro Traver	26	2018	0	0	2021	Youth system	
22	MF	(Spain)	Pablo Pérez	25	2017	82	8	2020	Youth system	
23	FW	(Serbia)	Uroš Đurđević	25	2018	0	0	2022	€2m	
24	DF	(Spain)	Álex Pérez	27	2017	37	1	2019	Free	
25	FW	(Spain)	Álex Alegría	26	2018	0	0	2019	Free	
	FW	(Spain)	Isma Cerro	23	2018	0	0	2021	Youth system	Without number since February 2019 due to his injure.

- Source: Stats updated as of the end of the 2017–18 season. Ages as of the end of the 2018–19 season. Only league games included.
- Ordered by squad number.

=== From the reserve team ===
Note: Flags indicate national team as defined under FIFA eligibility rules; some limited exceptions apply. Players may hold more than one non-FIFA nationality.

No.	Pos.	Nation	Player
26	DF	ESP	Carlos Cordero
27	MF	ESP	Pedro Díaz
28	MF	ESP	Pablo Fernández
30	GK	CUB	Christian Joel
31	MF	ESP	Pelayo Morilla

No.	Pos.	Nation	Player
32	DF	ESP	Alberto Espeso
33	MF	ESP	Garci
34	GK	ESP	Javi Benítez
35	MF	ESP	José Gragera

=== In ===
No.	Pos.	Nat.	Name	Age	Moving from	Type	Transfer window	Ends	Transfer fee	Source
	DF	(Martinique)	Jean-Sylvain Babin	31	(Israel) Maccabi Tel Aviv	End of loan	Summer	2019	Free	
	DF	(Algeria)	Rachid	25	(Belgium) Waasland-Beveren	End of loan	Summer	2019	Free	
	MF	(Spain)	Nacho Méndez	20	Real Sporting B	Promoted	Summer	2021	Free	
	GK	(Spain)	Dani Martín	19	Real Sporting B	Promoted	Summer	2021	Free	
	DF	(Spain)	Juan Rodríguez	23	Real Sporting B	Promoted	Summer	2020	Free	
	MF	(Spain)	Álvaro Traver	25	Real Sporting B	Promoted	Summer	2021	Free	
	MF	(Spain)	Cristian Salvador	23	Real Sporting B	Promoted	Summer	2021	Free	
	FW	(Spain)	Isma Cerro	22	Real Sporting B	Promoted	Summer	2021	Free	
	MF	(Portugal)	André Sousa	27	(Portugal) Belenenses	Loan	Summer	2019	Free	
	DF	(Spain)	Francisco Molinero	32	Getafe	Transfer	Summer	2020	Free	
	DF	(Portugal)	André Geraldes	27	(Portugal) Sporting CP (Note: Previously loaned to Belenenses.)	Loan	Summer	2019	Free	
	MF	(Finland)	Robin Lod	25	(Greece) Panathinaikos	Transfer	Summer	2020	Free	
	DF	(France)	Mathieu Peybernes	27	(France) Lorient (Note: Previously loaned to Eupen.)	Loan	Summer	2019	Free	
	MF	(Ghana)	Isaac Cofie	26	(Italy) Genoa	Transfer	Summer	2020	Free	
	FW	(England)	Nick Blackman	28	(England) Derby County (Note: Previously loaned to Maccabi Tel Aviv.)	Loan	Summer	2019	Free	
	DF	(Spain)	Javi Noblejas	25	Rayo Vallecano (Note: Previously loaned to Córdoba.)	Transfer	Summer	2019	Free	
	FW	(Serbia)	Uroš Đurđević	24	(Greece) Olympiacos	Transfer	Summer	2022	€2m	
	MF	(Spain)	Álvaro	31	Getafe	Loan	Summer	2019	Free	
	MF	(Spain)	Aitor García	24	Cádiz (Note: Previously loaned to Rayo Majadahonda.)	Loan	Winter	2019	Free	
	FW	(Spain)	Álex Alegría	26	Real Betis (Note: Previously loaned to Rayo Vallecano.)	Loan	Winter	2019	Free	
	FW	(Spain)	Ivi	24	Levante (Note: Previously loaned to Valladolid.)	Loan	Winter	2019	Free	

=== Out ===
No.	Pos.	Nat.	Name	Age	Moving to	Type	Transfer window	Transfer fee	Source
1	GK	(Spain)	Óscar Whalley	24	(Denmark) AGF	End of contract	Summer	Free	
4	MF	(Spain)	Álex Bergantiños	33	Deportivo La Coruña	End of loan	Summer	Free	
7	FW	(Uruguay)	Michael Santos	25	Málaga (Note: Later loaned to Leganés.)	End of loan	Summer	Free	
11	DF	(Spain)	Alberto Lora	31	(Cyprus) Omonia	End of contract	Summer	Free	
14	MF	(Spain)	Rubén García	24	Levante	End of loan	Summer	Free	
16	MF	(Spain)	Jony	26	Málaga (Note: Later loaned to Alavés.)	End of loan	Summer	Free	
17	DF	(Spain)	Álex López	30	(Australia) Brisbane Roar	End of contract	Summer	Free	
19	FW	(Spain)	Nano	23	Eibar (Note: Later loaned to Tenerife.)	End of loan	Summer	Free	
20	DF	(Colombia)	Juan Sebastián Quintero	23	(Colombia) Deportivo Cali	End of loan	Summer	Free	
21	FW	(Spain)	Borja Viguera	31	Numancia	End of contract	Summer	Free	
23	DF	(Spain)	Alberto Guitián	27	Valladolid	End of loan	Summer	Free	
25	DF	(Spain)	Jordi Calavera	22	Eibar	End of loan	Summer	Free	
	MF	(Spain)	Moi Gómez	24	Huesca	Loan	Summer	Free	
18	DF	(Spain)	Isma López	28	(Cyprus) Omonia	Transfer	Summer	Free	
9	FW	(Spain)	Carlos Castro	23	Mallorca	Transfer	Summer	Undisclosed	
6	MF	(Spain)	Sergio Álvarez	26	Eibar	Transfer	Summer	Undisclosed	
5	DF	(Italy)	Federico Barba	24	(Italy) Chievo Verona	Transfer	Summer	€3m	
7	MF	(Algeria)	Rachid	25	(Romania) Dinamo București	Termination	Summer	Free	
29	FW	(Switzerland)	Neftali Manzambi	21	Córdoba (Note: Previously transferred from Basel.)	Loan	Winter	Free	

=== Technical staff ===
Position	Staff
Manager	(Spain) José Alberto
Assistant manager	(Spain) Iván Hernández
Goalkeeping Coach	(Spain) Jorge Sariego
Physical trainer	(Spain) Rubén Biempica
Delegate	(Spain) Mario Cotelo
Director of Football	(Spain) Miguel Torrecilla
Academy Director	(Spain) Manolo Sánchez Murias

Source: Real Sporting

==== Managerial changes ====
Outgoing manager	Manner of departure	Date of vacancy	Position in table	Replaced by	Date of appointment
(Spain) Rubén Baraja	Sacked	18 November 2018	14th	(Spain) José Alberto	18 November 2018

== Pre-season and friendlies ==
18 July 2018 Friendly	Lealtad	1–2	Real Sporting	Villaviciosa
19:15	Francesco 11'	Report	Pablo Fernández 19'; Gorka 52'	Stadium: Les Caleyes; Referee: Gao Aladró

21 July 2018 Friendly	Real Sporting	1–1	Pontevedra	Avilés
12:00	Pablo Pérez 87'	Report	Campillo 78'	Stadium: Román Suárez Puerta; Referee: Areces Franco

25 July 2018 Friendly	Sestao River	0–5	Real Sporting	Sestao
19:00		Report	Pablo Pérez 6', 48'; Pedro Díaz 85'; Pablo Fernández 85'; Traver 89'	Stadium: Las Llanas; Referee: García Arriola

27 July 2018 Friendly	Real Sporting	2–0	Langreo	Gijón
19:00	André Sousa 37' (pen.); Lod 63'	Report		Stadium: Pepe Ortiz; Referee: Alonso Prendes

1 August 2018 Friendly	Cultural Leonesa	0–1	Real Sporting	León
20:00		Report	Nacho Méndez 55'	Stadium: Reino de León; Referee: Mallo Fernández

4 August 2018 Friendly	Chaves (Portugal)	0–0	Real Sporting	Chaves
		Report		Stadium: Branco Teixeira; Referee: André Santos

8 August 2018 Friendly	Getafe	0–0	Real Sporting	Zamora
19:30		Report		Stadium: Ruta de la Plata; Referee: Juan Bustos

10 August 2018 Friendly	Real Sporting B	0–1	Real Sporting	Gijón
11:00	Cristian Salvador 11'	Report		Stadium: Pepe Ortiz; Referee: Alonso Prendes

4 October 2018 Friendly	Real Sporting	2–0	Langreo	Gijón
11:00	Traver 7'; Morilla 67'	Report		Stadium: Pepe Ortiz; Referee: Pelayo Huergo

== Competitions ==
=== Segunda División ===
==== League table ====
Pos	Team	Pld	W	D	L	GF	GA	GD	Pts
7	Cádiz	42	16	16	10	53	36	+17	64
8	Oviedo	42	17	12	13	48	48	0	63
9	Sporting Gijón	42	16	13	13	43	38	+5	61
10	Almería	42	15	15	12	51	39	+12	60
11	Elche	42	13	16	13	49	52	−3	55

Source: La Liga
Rules for classification: 1) points; 2) head-to-head points; 3) head-to-head goal difference; 4) goal difference; 5) number of goals scored

==== Results summary ====
Overall								Home						Away					
Pld	W	D	L	GF	GA	GD	Pts	W	D	L	GF	GA	GD	W	D	L	GF	GA	GD
42	16	13	13	43	38	+5	61	10	6	5	23	17	+6	6	7	8	20	21	−1

==== Positions by round ====
Round	1	2	3	4	5	6	7	8	9	10	11	12	13	14	15	16	17	18	19	20	21	22	23	24	25	26	27	28	29	30	31	32	33	34	35	36	37	38	39	40	41	42
Ground	A	H	H	A	H	A	H	A	H	A	H	A	H	A	A	H	A	H	A	H	A	H	H	A	H	A	H	A	H	A	H	A	A	H	A	H	A	H	A	H	A	H
Result	D	W	W	L	D	L	W	L	D	D	D	L	D	L	W	W	D	W	D	L	D	W	L	W	L	L	L	W	W	W	W	D	W	W	D	D	L	D	L	L	W	W
Position	8	4	2	8	7	10	7	9	10	10	10	13	14	14	13	11	12	9	9	11	12	11	11	10	12	12	13	12	12	11	10	10	8	8	8	9	9	10	10	10	9	9

Source: BDFútbol
A = Away; H = Home; W = Win; D = Draw; L = Loss

==== Matches ====
18 August 2018 1	Alcorcón	1–1	Real Sporting	Alcorcón
20:30	Álvaro Peña (yellow card) 14' (goal) 67'	Report	André Sousa 90+3'	Stadium: Santo Domingo; Attendance: 2,397; Referee: Figueroa Vázquez

26 August 2018 2	Real Sporting	2–0	Gimnàstic	Gijón
19:00	Đurđević (yellow card) 14'; Hernán 24' (yellow card) 71'; Álvaro (yellow card) 52'; Lod 81'	Report	Abraham (yellow card) 25'	Stadium: El Molinón; Attendance: 21,484; Referee: Pérez Pallas

2 September 2018 3	Real Sporting	2–0	Extremadura	Gijón
16:00	Carmona 73' (pen.); Nacho Méndez 87'	Report	Djaló (yellow card) 34' (yellow-red card) 62'; Barrera (yellow card) 34'; Chuli (yellow card) 38'	Stadium: El Molinón; Attendance: 20,335; Referee: Soto Grado

9 September 2018 4	Deportivo La Coruña	1–0	Real Sporting	A Coruña
20:45	Didier Moreno (penalty missed) 30' (yellow card) 83'; Carlos Fernández (yellow card) 40'; Pablo Marí 90+4'	Report	Cofie (yellow card) 29' (yellow-red card) 75'; Álex Pérez (yellow card) 34'; André Sousa (yellow card) 60'; Nacho Méndez (yellow card) 64'	Stadium: Riazor; Attendance: 15,961; Referee: Sagués Oscoz

16 September 2018 5	Real Sporting	1–1	Numancia	Gijón
20:30	Babin 13' (yellow card) 42'; Cristian (yellow card) 32'; Canella (yellow card) 55'; Álex Pérez (yellow card) 66'; Álvaro (yellow card) 90+2'; Molinero (yellow card) 90+3'; Nacho Méndez (yellow card) 90+7'	Report	Atienza (yellow card) 38'; Fran Villalba 42' (yellow card) 45' (yellow-red card) 90+2'; Diamanka (yellow card) 44'; Marc Mateu (yellow card) 84'	Stadium: El Molinón; Attendance: 19,011; Referee: Trujillo Suárez

22 September 2018 6	Osasuna	1–0	Real Sporting	Pamplona
16:00	Oier (yellow card) 23'; Kike Barja (yellow card) 62'; Rubén García 73'	Report	Đurđević (yellow card) 21'; Molinero (yellow card) 45'; Cristian (yellow card) 69'; Nacho Méndez (yellow card) 72'	Stadium: El Sadar; Attendance: 13,432; Referee: Díaz de Mera Escuderos

29 September 2018 7	Real Sporting	1–0	Las Palmas	Gijón
18:00	Álvaro 30'; Carmona (yellow card) 39' (penalty missed) 60'	Report	Timor (yellow card) 5'; Blum (yellow card) 31'; Ruiz de Galarreta (yellow card) 42'; Lemos (yellow card) 59'; Cala (yellow card) 87'	Stadium: El Molinón; Attendance: 20,490; Referee: Arcediano Monescillo

8 October 2018 8	Rayo Majadahonda	2–1	Real Sporting	Madrid
20:00	Verza (yellow card) 13'; Aitor Ruibal (yellow card) 22'; Iza (yellow card) 22' (goal) 76'; Schiappacasse (yellow card) 35'; Aitor García 45' (yellow card) 47'; Luso (yellow card) 72'Francisco Varela (yellow card) 86'	Report	Sousa (yellow card) 32'; Carmona (yellow card) 49' (goal) 83'; Canella (yellow card) 64'	Stadium: Wanda Metropolitano; Attendance: 4,508; Referee: López Toca

13 October 2018 9	Real Sporting	1–1	Reus	Gijón
18:00	Juan Rodríguez (yellow card) 37'; Đurđević (penalty missed) 45'; Nacho Méndez (yellow card) 72'; Carmona 90+4' (pen.)	Report	Gus Ledes (yellow card) 29'; Guerrero (yellow card) 42'; Linares 68'; Badía (yellow card) 90+4'	Stadium: El Molinón; Attendance: 18,969; Referee: Varón Aceitón

21 October 2018 10	Cádiz	0–0	Real Sporting	Cádiz
20:30	José Mari (yellow card) 90'	Report	Cofie (yellow card) 29'; Pablo Pérez (yellow card) 80'; Neftali (yellow card) 90'	Stadium: Ramón de Carranza; Attendance: 11,735; Referee: Soto Grado

26 October 2018 11	Real Sporting	0–0	Córdoba	Gijón
21:00	Neftali (yellow card) 6'; Molinero (yellow card) 53'	Report	Luis Muñoz (yellow card) 90+2'	Stadium: El Molinón; Attendance: 16,118; Referee: Iglesias Villanueva

4 November 2018 12	Almería	2–1	Real Sporting	Almería
18:00	Álvaro 36' (pen.); Owona (yellow card) 41'; Andoni López 73' (yellow card) 74'	Report	Pablo Pérez 10'; Molinero (yellow card) 35'; Cristian (yellow card) 90+2'	Stadium: Mediterráneo; Attendance: 7,528; Referee: Ais Reig

11 November 2018 13	Real Sporting	2–2	Málaga	Gijón
18:00	Pablo Pérez (yellow card) 17'; Cristian (yellow card) 54'; Álex Pérez (yellow card) 64'; Noblejas (yellow card) 67'; Carmona 76' (pen.), 90+4'	Report	Lombán (yellow card) 26'; Diego González (yellow card) 56'; Blanco Leschuk (penalty missed) 65'; Juanpi 65'; Koné 80'; Boulahroud (yellow card) 90'	Stadium: El Molinón; Attendance: 18,559; Referee: Sagués Oscoz

17 November 2018 14	Oviedo	2–1	Real Sporting	Oviedo
20:45	Ibra 6'; Alanís 14'; Berjón (yellow card) 40'; Tejera (yellow card) 58'; Javi Hernández (yellow card) 88'	Report	Cristian (yellow card) 29'; Molinero (yellow card) 51'; Hernán (yellow card) 54'; Carmona 63' (pen.); Neftali (yellow card) 88'	Stadium: Carlos Tartiere; Attendance: 23,175; Referee: Trujillo Suárez

23 November 2018 15	Granada	1–2	Real Sporting	Granada
21:00	Ramos (yellow card) 43' (goal) 84'; Germán (yellow card) 55'; J.A. Martínez (yellow card) 80'; Montoro (yellow card) 85'; Pozo (yellow card) 90+2'; Aguirre (yellow card) 90+4'	Report	Cofie 14' (yellow card) 28'; Peybernes (yellow card) 43'; Nacho Méndez (yellow card) 83'; Pablo Pérez (yellow card) 86'; Traver 90+3'	Stadium: Los Cármenes; Attendance: 10,076; Referee: Ocón Arraiz

1 December 2018 16	Real Sporting	2–1	Tenerife	Gijón
20:30	Đurđević (yellow card) 35' (goal) 67'; Cordero (yellow card) 43'; Carmona (yellow card) 46'; Babin 67' (yellow card) 70'	Report	Jorge Sáenz (yellow card) 24'; Acosta (yellow card) 48'; Milla (yellow card) 64'; Naranjo 72'	Stadium: El Molinón; Attendance: 19,035; Referee: Ávalos Barrera

9 December 2018 17	Elche	0–0	Real Sporting	Elche
18:00	Verdú (yellow card) 8'; Sory Kaba (yellow card) 33'; Borja (yellow card) 40'; Neyder (yellow card) 69'; Benja (penalty missed) 78'Provencio (yellow card) 86'	Report	André Sousa (yellow card) 36'; Cristian (yellow card) 67'; Blackman (penalty missed) 74'; Cordero (yellow card) 77'	Stadium: Manuel Martínez Valero; Attendance: 10,156; Referee: Pizarro Gómez

15 December 2018 18	Real Sporting	1–0	Mallorca	Gijón
20:00	Carmona (yellow card) 50'; Blackman 58'; Nacho Méndez (yellow card) 65'	Report	Fran Gámez (yellow card) 33'; Sastre (yellow card) 62'; Pedraza (yellow card) 82'; Raíllo (yellow card) 85'	Stadium: El Molinón; Attendance: 18,170; Referee: Moreno Aragón

22 December 2018 19	Lugo	0–0	Real Sporting	Lugo
13:00	Muñiz (yellow card) 26'; Herrera (yellow card) 54'; Vieira (yellow card) 58'; Josete (yellow card) 87'	Report	Nacho Méndez (yellow card) 30'; Babin (yellow card) 33'	Stadium: Anxo Carro; Attendance: 5,558; Referee: Gallastegui Fernández-Ortega

5 January 2019 20	Real Sporting	1–2	Zaragoza	Gijón
16:00	Đurđević 13'; Traver (yellow card) 22'; Geraldes (yellow card) 34'; Pablo Pérez (yellow card) 90+1'	Report	Álex Muñoz 27'; Guti 39'; Marc Gual (yellow card) 43'; Eguaras (yellow card) 48'	Stadium: El Molinón; Attendance: 22,106; Referee: Soto Grado

12 January 2019 21	Albacete	1–1	Real Sporting	Albacete
16:00	Malsa (yellow card) 71'; Acuña (yellow card) 83'; Zozulya 86'	Report	Đurđević 24'; Hernán (yellow card) 64'; Canella (yellow card) 90+2'	Stadium: Carlos Belmonte; Attendance: 10,686; Referee: Milla Alvendiz

20 January 2019 22	Real Sporting	2–0	Alcorcón	Gijón
16:00	Đurđević 1'; Peybernes (yellow card) 25'; Lod 46'; Cristian (yellow card) 63'	Report	Burgos (yellow card) 31'; Casadesús (yellow card) 35'; Dorca (yellow card) 41'; Felipe	Stadium: El Molinón; Attendance: 17,104; Referee: Trujillo Suárez

27 January 2019 23	Real Sporting	1–2	Deportivo La Coruña	Gijón
18:00	Đurđević 12'; Cristian (yellow card) 26'; Geraldes (yellow card) 89'	Report	Bergantiños 7'; Santos 15'; Dani Giménez (yellow card) 19'; Duarte (yellow card) 54'; Vicente Gómez (yellow card) 80'; Carlos Fernández (yellow card) 90'	Stadium: El Molinón; Attendance: 20,627; Referee: Pulido Santana

3 February 2019 24	Extremadura	0–3	Real Sporting	Almendralejo
20:00	Nando (yellow card) 36'; Perea (yellow card) 58'; Pomares (yellow card) 79'	Report	Babin (yellow card) 27'; Aitor García 66'; Đurđević (yellow card) 83' (goal) 88', 90+2'; Carmona (yellow card) 80'	Stadium: Francisco de la Hera; Attendance: 10,440; Referee: Varón Aceitón

8 February 2019 25	Real Sporting	0–2	Osasuna	Gijón
21:00	Đurđević (yellow card) 74'	Report	Oier 37'; David García (yellow card) 58'; Roberto Torres 69'	Stadium: El Molinón; Attendance: 17,806; Referee: Ais Reig

17 February 2019 26	Las Palmas	1–0	Real Sporting	Las Palmas
20:00	Ruiz de Galarreta 10'; Araujo (yellow card) 73'; Lemos (yellow card) 86'; Mantovani (yellow card) 90+3'	Report	Cristian (yellow card) 10'; Hernán (yellow card) 31'; Cordero (yellow card) 36'; Geraldes (yellow card) 38'	Stadium: Gran Canaria; Attendance: 12,265; Referee: Pérez Pallas

24 February 2019 27	Real Sporting	2–3	Rayo Majadahonda	Gijón
12:00	André Sousa 48' (yellow card) 81'; Cordero (yellow card) 58'	Report	Iza (yellow card) 18'; Aitor 32', 56'; Verdés (yellow card) 38' (goal) 52'; Luso (yellow card) 67'; Basilio (yellow card) 78'	Stadium: El Molinón; Attendance: 17,296; Referee: Domínguez Cervantes

3 March 2019 28	Numancia	1–2	Real Sporting	Soria
16:00	Diamanka 32'; Escassi (yellow card) 56'; Gus Ledes (yellow card) 65'; David Rodríguez (yellow card) 86'	Report	Cristian 1' (yellow card) 36'; Cofie (yellow card) 22'; Álex Alegría 34'; Molinero (yellow card) 62'; Pablo Pérez (yellow card) 69'	Stadium: Los Pajaritos; Attendance: 4,078; Referee: Trujillo Suárez

9 March 2019 29	Real Sporting	1–0	Almería	Gijón
18:00	Cofie (yellow card) 21'; Đurđević (yellow card) 25'; Álex Alegría 64'; Nacho Méndez (yellow card) 90+2'	Report	Juan (yellow card) 25' (yellow-red card) 90+3'	Stadium: El Molinón; Attendance: 17,348; Referee: Arcediano Monescillo

17 March 2019 30	Córdoba	1–2	Real Sporting	Córdoba
16:00	Luis Muñoz (yellow card) 21'; Carrillo 30' (yellow card) 84'; Miguel Flaño (yellow card) 80'; Quintanilla (yellow card) 89'	Report	Álex Pérez (yellow card) 24'; Peybernes 38'; Nacho Méndez (yellow card) 65'; Carmona 81'	Stadium: Nuevo Arcángel; Attendance: 10,258; Referee: Ávalos Barrera

24 March 2019 31	Real Sporting	1–0	Oviedo	Gijón
20:45	Cofie (yellow card) 3'; Đurđević (yellow card) 29' (penalty missed) 72; Bolaño 32' (o.g.); Traver (yellow card) 57'; Peybernes (yellow card) 77'; Molinero (yellow card) 88'	Report	Saúl Berjón (yellow card) 17'; Javi Muñoz (yellow card) 18'; Carlos Hernández (yellow card) 63'; Mossa (yellow card) 68'; Bolaño (yellow card) 71'; Tejera (yellow card) 88'; Toché (yellow card) 90'; Ibra (yellow card) 90+1'	Stadium: El Molinón; Attendance: 26,748; Referee: Díaz de Mera Escuderos

29 March 2019 32	Málaga	1–1	Real Sporting	Málaga
21:00	Erik Morán (yellow card) 18'; Adrián (yellow card) 19'; Alejo (yellow card) 27'; Diego González (yellow card) 55' (yellow-red card) 71'; Blanco Leschuk 82'; N'Diaye (yellow card) 88'	Report	Đurđević 20' (pen.); Molinero (yellow card) 23'; Babin (yellow card) 57'; Geraldes (yellow card) 63'; Pablo Pérez (red card) 66'; Lod (yellow card) 80'; Traver (yellow card) 84'; Álex Alegría (yellow card) 89'	Stadium: La Rosaleda; Attendance: 17,055; Referee: Pizarro Gómez

5 April 2019 33	Tenerife	0–1	Real Sporting	Santa Cruz de Tenerife
21:00	Dos Santos (yellow card) 55'; Suso (yellow card) 66'; Račić (yellow card) 76'; Milla (yellow card) 90+2'	Report	Molinero (yellow card) 33'; Đurđević 37' (yellow card) 66'; Peybernes (yellow card) 50'; Ivi (yellow card) 68'	Stadium: Heliodoro Rodríguez López; Attendance: 10,180; Referee: Moreno Aragón

12 April 2019 34	Real Sporting	1–0	Granada	Gijón
21:00	Đurđević 1' (yellow card) 41'; Molinero (yellow card) 55'; Traver (yellow card) 79'; Cofie (yellow card) 87'	Report	Montoro (yellow card) 16'; Fede Vico (yellow card) 49'; Víctor Díaz (yellow card) 56'; Ramos (yellow card) 84'	Stadium: El Molinón; Attendance: 20,052; Referee: Sagués Oscoz

20 April 2019 35	Gimnàstic	0–0	Real Sporting	Tarragona
18:00	Mikel (yellow card) 26'; Fali (yellow card) 42'; Javi Márquez (yellow card) 90+3'	Report	Ivi (yellow card) 51'	Stadium: Nou Estadi; Attendance: 2,497; Referee: De la Fuente Ramos

28 April 2019 36	Real Sporting	1–1	Elche	Gijón
16:00	Babin (yellow card) 21' (goal) 28'	Report	Dani Calvo (yellow card) 11'; Neyder (yellow card) 72'; Nino 75'; Manuel (yellow card) 77'; Javi Flores (yellow card) 90+3'	Stadium: El Molinón; Attendance: 19,850; Referee: Figueroa Vázquez

5 May 2019 37	Mallorca	2–1	Real Sporting	Palma de Mallorca
16:00	Budimir 19'; Salva Sevilla (yellow card) 48'; Raíllo (yellow card) 57'; Dani Rodríguez (yellow card) 84'; Álex López 90+5'	Report	Đurđević 32' (yellow card) 90+3'; Carmona (yellow card) 47'	Stadium: Son Moix; Attendance: 11,302; Referee: Díaz de Mera Escuderos

11 May 2019 38	Real Sporting	0–0	Lugo	Gijón
16:00	Cofie (yellow card) 31'; Nacho Méndez (yellow card) 42'; Molinero (yellow card) 45'; Pablo Pérez (yellow card) 49'	Report	Vieira (yellow card) 36'; Herrera (yellow card) 56'; Aburjania (yellow card) 58'; Luis Ruiz (yellow card) 78'; Gerard (yellow card) 88'	Stadium: El Molinón; Attendance: 16,206; Referee: Milla Alvéndiz

17 May 2019 39	Zaragoza	4–2	Real Sporting	Zaragoza
21:00	Pombo (yellow card) 36'; Álvaro 39', 70'; Papunashvili 66'; Gual 90+1'	Report	Lod 8', 47'; Babin (yellow card) 34'	Stadium: La Romareda; Attendance: 17,059; Referee: Ais Reig

25 May 2019 40	Real Sporting	0–2	Albacete	Gijón
18:00	Nacho Méndez (yellow card) 8'; Pedro Díaz (yellow card) 27'; Molinero (yellow card) 34'; Peybernes (yellow card) 40' (yellow-red card) 41'; Cristian (yellow card) 55'	Report	Eugeni 43' (pen.); Acuña 58'; Arroyo (yellow card) 72'; Febas (yellow card) 77'; Malsa (yellow card) 90+2'	Stadium: El Molinón; Attendance: 10,906; Referee: Milla Alvéndiz

41	Reus	0–1	Real Sporting	Reus
		Report		Stadium: Municipal
Note: Match awarded after the disqualification of Reus.

8 June 2019 42	Real Sporting	1–0	Cádiz	Gijón
20:30	Nacho Méndez 13'; Đurđević (yellow card) 71'; Pablo Pérez (yellow card) 74'; Cristian (yellow card) 76'	Report		Stadium: El Molinón; Attendance: 8,600; Referee: Ocón Arraiz

=== Copa del Rey ===
==== Matches ====
13 September 2018 Second round	Numancia	1–2	Real Sporting	Soria
20:00	Marcos Isla 52'	Report	Higinio 28' (o.g.); Morilla 31'	Stadium: Los Pajaritos; Attendance: 2,853; Referee: Ocón Arraiz

18 October 2018 Third round	Rayo Majadahonda	1–1 (a.e.t.) (3–4 p)	Real Sporting	Madrid
20:00	Galán (yellow card) 17'; Morillas (yellow card) 38'; Benito (yellow card) 53'; Aitor Ruibal 90'	Report	Neftali 23'; Hernán (yellow card) 34'; Geraldes (yellow card) 99'; Peybernes (yellow card) 109'	Stadium: Wanda Metropolitano; Attendance: 2,156; Referee: Pérez Pallas
	Penalties
	Galán (penalty scored); Enzo (penalty missed); Fede Varela (penalty missed); Jeisson (penalty scored); Iza; Schiappacasse (penalty missed)		(penalty missed) Pedro Díaz; (penalty scored) Javi Noblejas; (penalty scored) Isma Cerro; (penalty scored) Morilla; (penalty missed) Neftali; (penalty scored) Nacho Méndez

1 November 2018 Round of 32; First leg	Real Sporting	2–0	Eibar	Gijón
12:00	Đurđević 54'; Traver (yellow card) 58'; Neftali 86'; Álvaro (yellow card) 90+1'	Report	Arbilla 89'; Pere Milla (yellow card) 90+1'	Stadium: El Molinón; Attendance: 12,902; Referee: Jaime Latre

6 December 2018 Round of 32; Second leg	Eibar	2–2 (2–4 agg.)	Real Sporting	Eibar
18:30 CET	Jordán (yellow card) 16'; Cucurella 53' (yellow card) 85'; Charles 87'	Report	Álvaro 13'; Espeso (yellow card) 35'; Pablo Pérez 39'	Stadium: Ipurua; Attendance: 4,970; Referee: José Luis González González

8 January 2019 Round of 16; First leg	Real Sporting	2–1	Valencia	Gijón
21:30	Álvaro (yellow card) 32'; Noblejas 34'; Blackman 79'	Report	Ruben Vezo (yellow card) 36'; Parejo 45'	Stadium: El Molinón; Attendance: 9,870; Referee: Alberto Undiano Mallenco

15 January 2019 Round of 16; Second leg	Valencia	3–0	Real Sporting	Valencia
21:30	Wass (yellow card) 21'; Diakhaby (yellow card) 41'; Coquelin (yellow card) 42'; Santi Mina 65', 76'; Ferran 90'	Report	Blackman (yellow card) 18'; Noblejas (yellow card) 51'; Đurđević (yellow card) 79'	Stadium: Mestalla; Attendance: 33,149; Referee: Xavier Estrada Fernández

== Statistics ==
=== Appearances and goals ===
No.	Pos	Nat	Player	Total		La Liga		Copa del Rey	
No.	Pos	Nat	Player	Apps	Goals	Apps	Goals	Apps	Goals
1	GK	(Spain) ESP	Dani Martín	9	0	3+1	0	5+0	0
2	DF	(Spain) ESP	Francisco Molinero	31	0	27+0	0	4+0	0
3	DF	(Spain) ESP	Javi Noblejas	5	1	1+0	0	4+0	1
4	DF	(Spain) ESP	Juan Rodríguez	8	0	2+0	0	6+0	0
5	MF	(Ghana) GHA	Isaac Cofie	29	1	23+2	1	4+0	0
6	DF	(Martinique) MTQ	Jean-Sylvain Babin	36	3	34+0	3	2+0	0
7	MF	(Spain) ESP	Aitor García	11	1	11+0	1	0+0	0
8	MF	(Spain) ESP	Hernán Santana	19	1	11+4	1	4+0	0
9	FW	(England) ENG	Nick Blackman	15	2	3+9	1	2+1	1
10	MF	(Spain) ESP	Carlos Carmona	35	7	30+5	7	0+0	0
11	FW	(Spain) ESP	Ivi	7	0	2+5	0	0+0	0
11	FW	(Spain) ESP	Isma Cerro	4	0	2+0	0	1+1	0
12	MF	(Spain) ESP	Álvaro	24	2	12+8	1	3+1	1
13	GK	(Spain) ESP	Diego Mariño	38	0	37+0	0	1+0	0
14	MF	(Spain) ESP	Nacho Méndez	36	2	24+7	2	2+3	0
15	DF	(Spain) ESP	Roberto Canella	20	0	16+2	0	2+0	0
16	MF	(Portugal) POR	André Sousa	24	2	16+6	2	1+1	0
17	MF	(Finland) FIN	Robin Lod	25	4	14+9	4	2+0	0
18	DF	(Portugal) POR	André Geraldes	35	0	30+3	0	2+0	0
19	DF	(France) FRA	Mathieu Peybernes	29	1	26+0	1	3+0	0
20	MF	(Spain) ESP	Cristian Salvador	33	1	21+9	1	3+0	0
21	MF	(Spain) ESP	Álvaro Traver	29	1	16+9	1	2+2	0
22	MF	(Spain) ESP	Pablo Pérez	30	2	6+18	1	5+1	1
23	FW	(Serbia) SRB	Uroš Đurđević	40	12	36+2	11	1+1	1
24	DF	(Spain) ESP	Álex Pérez	22	0	20+1	0	1+0	0
25	FW	(Spain) ESP	Álex Alegría	16	3	13+3	3	0+0	0
26	DF	(Spain) ESP	Carlos Cordero	13	0	8+4	0	1+0	0
27	MF	(Spain) ESP	Pedro Díaz	8	0	2+1	0	1+4	0
28	MF	(Spain) ESP	Pablo Fernández	2	0	1+0	0	0+1	0
30	GK	(Spain) ESP	Christian Joel	1	0	1+0	0	0+0	0
31	MF	(Spain) ESP	Pelayo Morilla	5	1	1+2	0	1+1	1
32	DF	(Spain) ESP	Alberto Espeso	1	0	0+0	0	1+0	0
35	MF	(Spain) ESP	José Gragera	1	0	0+1	0	0+0	0
Players who have left the club after the start of the season:
29	FW	(Switzerland) SUI	Neftali Manzambi	15	2	2+10	0	2+1	2

- Source: BDFútbol

=== Disciplinary record ===
N	P	Nat.	Name	Segunda			Copa del Rey			Total			Notes
N	P	Nat.	Name	Yellow card	Second yellow card	Red card	Yellow card	Second yellow card	Red card	Yellow card	Second yellow card	Red card	Notes
22	MF	(Spain)	Pablo Pérez	7		1				7		1	6 times captain
5	MF	(Ghana)	Isaac Cofie	8	1					8	1		
19	DF	(France)	Mathieu Peybernes	5	1		1			6	1		
2	DF	(Spain)	Francisco Molinero	12						12			
20	MF	(Spain)	Cristian Salvador	12						12			
23	FW	(Serbia)	Uroš Đurđević	11			1			12			
14	MF	(Spain)	Nacho Méndez	11						11			
6	DF	(Martinique)	Jean-Sylvain Babin	8						8			2 times captain
10	MF	(Spain)	Carlos Carmona	6						6			17 times captain
8	MF	(Spain)	Hernán Santana	4			1			5			
18	DF	(Portugal)	André Geraldes	4			1			5			
21	MF	(Spain)	Álvaro Traver	4			1			5			
12	MF	(Spain)	Álvaro	2			2			4			
16	MF	(Portugal)	André Sousa	4						4			
24	DF	(Spain)	Álex Pérez	4						4			
26	DF	(Spain)	Carlos Cordero	4						4			
15	DF	(Spain)	Roberto Canella	3						3			18 times captain
3	DF	(Spain)	Javi Noblejas	1			1			2			
11	FW	(Spain)	Ivi	2						2			
27	MF	(Spain)	Pedro Díaz	1			1			2			
4	DF	(Spain)	Juan Rodríguez	1						1			
9	FW	(England)	Nick Blackman				1			1			
17	MF	(Finland)	Robin Lod	1						1			
25	FW	(Spain)	Álex Alegría	1						1			
32	MF	(Spain)	Alberto Espeso				1			1			
1	GK	(Spain)	Dani Martín										
7	MF	(Spain)	Aitor García										
11	FW	(Spain)	Isma Cerro										
13	GK	(Spain)	Diego Mariño										3 times captain
31	MF	(Spain)	Pelayo Morilla										
Players who have left the club after the start of the season:
29	FW	(Switzerland)	Neftali Manzambi	3						3			

Source: BDFútbol
Only competitive matches
(yellow card) = Number of bookings; (second yellow card) = Number of sending offs after a second yellow card; (red card) = Number of sending offs by a direct red card.
