= 2018–19 SD Eibar season =

SD Eibar
2018–19 season
- President: Amaia Gorostiza
- Head coach: José Luis Mendilibar
- Stadium: Ipurua
- La Liga: 12th
- Copa del Rey: Round of 32
- Top goalscorer: League: Charles (14); All: Charles (15)
- Highest home attendance: 6,519 vs Athletic Bilbao (21 October 2018)
- Lowest home attendance: 3,592 vs Espanyol (21 January 2019)
- Average home league attendance: 4,878
Home colours	Away colours	Third colours

The 2018–19 season was SD Eibar's 79th season in existence and the club's fifth consecutive season in the top flight of Spanish football.

== Players ==
As of 31 August 2018

Note: Flags indicate national team as defined under FIFA eligibility rules; some limited exceptions apply. Players may hold more than one non-FIFA nationality.

No.	Pos.	Nation	Player
1	GK	SRB	Marko Dmitrović
2	DF	ESP	Jordi Calavera
3	DF	ESP	Pedro Bigas (on loan from Las Palmas)
4	DF	ESP	Iván Ramis
5	MF	ARG	Gonzalo Escalante (3rd captain)
6	MF	ESP	Sergio Álvarez
7	FW	ESP	Marc Cardona (on loan from Barcelona)
8	MF	SEN	Pape Diop
9	FW	ESP	Sergi Enrich (2nd captain)
11	DF	ESP	Rubén Peña
12	DF	POR	Paulo Oliveira
13	GK	ESP	Asier Riesgo (Captain)

No.	Pos.	Nation	Player
14	MF	CHI	Fabián Orellana
15	DF	ESP	José Ángel
16	MF	ARG	Pablo de Blasis
17	FW	ESP	Kike
18	MF	ESP	Pablo Hervías
19	FW	BRA	Charles
20	DF	ESP	Marc Cucurella (on loan from Barcelona)
21	MF	ESP	Pedro León
22	MF	ESP	Pere Milla
23	DF	ESP	Anaitz Arbilla
24	MF	ESP	Joan Jordán

=== Out on loan ===
Note: Flags indicate national team as defined under FIFA eligibility rules; some limited exceptions apply. Players may hold more than one non-FIFA nationality.

No.	Pos.	Nation	Player
—	GK	ESP	Yoel (at Valladolid until 30 June 2019)
—	DF	ESP	Unai Elgezabal (at Alcorcón until 30 June 2019)

No.	Pos.	Nation	Player
—	DF	ESP	José Antonio Martínez (at Granada until 30 June 2019)
—	FW	ESP	Nano (at Tenerife until 30 June 2019)

== Transfers ==
=== In ===
Date	Player	From	Type	Fee	Ref
27 April 2018	(Chile) Fabián Orellana	(Spain) Valencia	Transfer	€2,000,000	
30 June 2018	(Portugal) Bebé	(Spain) Rayo Vallecano	Loan return		
30 June 2018	(Spain) Unai Elgezabal	(Spain) Numancia	Loan return		
30 June 2018	(Spain) Álex Gálvez	(Spain) Las Palmas	Loan return		
30 June 2018	(Spain) Pablo Hervías	(Spain) Valladolid	Loan return		
30 June 2018	(Spain) Pere Milla	(Spain) Numancia	Loan return		
30 June 2018	(Spain) Nano	(Spain) Sporting Gijón	Loan return		
30 June 2018	(Spain) Christian Rivera	(Spain) Barcelona B	Loan return		
1 July 2018	(Spain) José Antonio Martínez	(Spain) Barcelona B	Transfer	Free	
19 July 2018	(Spain) Marc Cardona	(Spain) Barcelona B	Loan		
26 July 2018	(Spain) Sergio Álvarez	(Spain) Sporting Gijón	Transfer	€4,000,000	
31 July 2018	(Spain) Pedro Bigas	(Spain) Las Palmas	Loan		
30 August 2018	(Argentina) Pablo de Blasis	(Germany) Mainz 05	Transfer	€2,000,000	
31 August 2018	(Spain) Marc Cucurella	(Spain) Barcelona B	Loan		

=== Out ===
Date	Player	To	Type	Fee	Ref
27 April 2018	(Chile) Fabián Orellana	(Spain) Valencia	Loan return		
25 May 2018	(Spain) Ander Capa	(Spain) Athletic Bilbao	Transfer	€3,000,000	
4 June 2018	(Spain) David Juncà	(Spain) Celta Vigo	Transfer	Free	
30 June 2018	(Serbia) Vukašin Jovanović	(France) Bordeaux	Loan return		
30 June 2018	(Spain) David Lombán	(Spain) Málaga	Transfer	Free	
30 June 2018	(Spain) Fran Rico	(Spain) Granada	Loan return		
1 July 2018	(Spain) Dani García	(Spain) Athletic Bilbao	Transfer	Free	
1 July 2018	(Japan) Takashi Inui	(Spain) Betis	Transfer	Free	
26 July 2018	(Spain) Iván Alejo	(Spain) Getafe	Transfer	€4,000,000	
30 July 2018	(Spain) José Antonio Martínez	(Spain) Granada	Loan		
31 July 2018	(Spain) Christian Rivera	(Spain) Las Palmas	Transfer	Undisclosed	
4 August 2018	(Spain) Nano	(Spain) Tenerife	Loan		
15 August 2018	(Spain) Unai Elgezabal	(Spain) Alcorcón	Loan		
30 August 2018	(Spain) Yoel	(Spain) Valladolid	Loan		
31 August 2018	(Portugal) Bebé	(Spain) Rayo Vallecano	Transfer	€750,000	
31 August 2018	(Spain) Álex Gálvez	(Spain) Rayo Vallecano	Transfer	Free	

== Competitions ==
=== La Liga ===
==== League table ====
Pos	Team	Pld	W	D	L	GF	GA	GD	Pts
10	Real Betis	38	14	8	16	44	52	−8	50 (Note: Real Sociedad finished ahead of Real Betis and Alavés on head-to-head points: Real Sociedad 6, Real Betis 5, Alavés 5. Real Betis finished ahead of Alavés on goal difference: Real Betis –8, Alavés –11.)
11	Alavés	38	13	11	14	39	50	−11	50
12	Eibar	38	11	14	13	46	50	−4	47
13	Leganés	38	11	12	15	37	43	−6	45
14	Villarreal	38	10	14	14	49	52	−3	44 (Note: Villarreal finished ahead of Levante on head-to-head points: Villarreal 1–1 Levante, Levante 0–2 Villarreal.)

Source: La Liga, Soccerway
Rules for classification: 1) Points; 2) Head-to-head points; 3) Head-to-head goal difference; 4) Goal difference; 5) Goals scored; 6) Fair-play points (Note: Head-to-head record is used only after all the matches between the teams in question have been played)

==== Results summary ====
Overall								Home						Away					
Pld	W	D	L	GF	GA	GD	Pts	W	D	L	GF	GA	GD	W	D	L	GF	GA	GD
38	11	14	13	46	50	−4	47	9	6	4	31	21	+10	2	8	9	15	29	−14

Last updated: 19 May 2019.
Source: Competitive matches

==== Results by round ====
Round	1	2	3	4	5	6	7	8	9	10	11	12	13	14	15	16	17	18	19	20	21	22	23	24	25	26	27	28	29	30	31	32	33	34	35	36	37	38
Ground	H	A	H	A	H	A	H	A	H	A	H	A	H	A	H	H	A	H	A	H	A	H	A	H	A	H	A	H	A	H	A	A	H	A	A	H	A	H
Result	L	L	W	D	W	L	L	W	D	L	W	D	W	L	D	D	D	D	L	W	D	W	D	D	L	W	D	L	D	W	L	D	L	L	W	W	L	D
Position	14	19	15	15	11	13	17	12	12	15	12	13	10	12	14	13	13	13	15	11	11	10	10	10	11	10	11	11	11	11	12	13	13	13	13	11	12	12

Updated to match(es) played on 19 May 2019. Source: Competitive matches
A = Away; H = Home; W = Win; D = Draw; L = Loss

==== Matches ====
Win Draw Loss Fixtures

19 August 2018 1	Eibar	1–2	Huesca	Eibar
18:15 CEST (UTC+02:00)	Jordán (yellow card) 50'; Escalante 69'	Report	Gallar 5', 40'; Longo (yellow card) 90+3'	Stadium: Ipurua; Attendance: 4,209; Referee: Eduardo Prieto Iglesias

24 August 2018 2	Getafe	2–0	Eibar	Getafe
20:15 CEST (UTC+02:00)	Djené (yellow card) 1'; Ángel 18'; Alejo (yellow card) 46'; Molina 90'	Report	Arbilla (yellow card) 90+1'	Stadium: Coliseum Alfonso Pérez; Attendance: 7,600; Referee: David Medié Jiménez

31 August 2018 3	Eibar	2–1	Real Sociedad	Eibar
22:00 CEST (UTC+02:00)	Dmitrović (yellow card) 14'; Cucurella 26'; Diop (yellow card) 34'; Peña (yellow card) 75'; Charles 90+1'	Report	Willian José 15' (pen.); Juanmi (yellow card) 58'; Illarramendi (yellow card) 80'	Stadium: Ipurua; Attendance: 6,174; Referee: José María Sánchez Martínez

16 September 2018 4	Atlético Madrid	1–1	Eibar	Madrid
13:00 CEST (UTC+02:00)	Koke (yellow card) 39'; Godín (yellow card) 51'; Garcés 90+4'	Report	Charles (yellow card) 16'; Diop (yellow card) 54'; Enrich 87'	Stadium: Wanda Metropolitano; Attendance: 55,674; Referee: Juan Martínez Munuera

22 September 2018 5	Eibar	1–0	Leganés	Eibar
16:15 CEST (UTC+02:00)	Escalante (yellow card) 24'; Kike 52'	Report	Gumbau (yellow card) 67'	Stadium: Ipurua; Attendance: 4,456; Referee: Mario Melero López

25 September 2018 6	Espanyol	1–0	Eibar	Cornellà de Llobregat
20:00 CEST (UTC+02:00)	García (yellow card) 25'; Baptistão (yellow card) 60'; Hermoso 68'	Report	Jordán (yellow card) 66'; Bigas (yellow card) 74'	Stadium: RCDE Stadium; Attendance: 13,469; Referee: José Luis Munuera Montero

29 September 2018 7	Eibar	1–3	Sevilla	Eibar
18:30 CEST (UTC+02:00)	Ramis (yellow card) 17'; Orellana (yellow card) 56'; Jordán 90+9'	Report	Silva 47'; Banega 59' (pen.), 90+4', (yellow card) 80'; Vázquez (yellow card) 89'; Arana (yellow card) 90+7'	Stadium: Ipurua; Attendance: 5,504; Referee: Xavier Estrada Fernández

6 October 2018 8	Girona	2–3	Eibar	Girona
13:00 CEST (UTC+02:00)	Juanpe (yellow card) 6'; Aday (yellow card) 11'; Portu (yellow card) 15'; Stuani 40', 42'	Report	Charles 12' (pen.); José Ángel (yellow card) 20'; Jordán (yellow card) 34'; Diop (yellow card) 41'; Riesgo (yellow card) 45'; Arbilla 45', (yellow card) 59'; Oliveira (yellow card) 61'; Enrich 72'	Stadium: Montilivi; Attendance: 10,569; Referee: Eduardo Prieto Iglesias

21 October 2018 9	Eibar	1–1	Athletic Bilbao	Eibar
16:15 CEST (UTC+02:00)	Charles 17' (pen.); Orellana (yellow card) 23'; Enrich (yellow card) 75'	Report	Williams 21'; Lopez (yellow card) 28'; De Marcos (yellow card) 65'; García (yellow card) 87'	Stadium: Ipurua; Attendance: 6,519; Referee: Jesús Gil Manzano

27 October 2018 10	Celta Vigo	4–0	Eibar	Vigo
18:30 CEST (UTC+02:00)	Aspas 5', 36', 82'; Méndez 56'	Report		Stadium: Abanca-Balaídos; Attendance: 31,800; Referee: José Luis González González

4 November 2018 11	Eibar	2–1	Alavés	Eibar
12:00 CET (UTC+01:00)	De Blasis (yellow card) 61' (yellow-red card) 62'; Jordán 69'; Orellana (yellow card) 73'; Arbilla (yellow card) 78'; Diop (yellow card) 88', (goal) 90+1'	Report	Jony 4'; Duarte (red card) 24'	Stadium: Ipurua; Attendance: 5,698; Referee: Ignacio Iglesias Villanueva

11 November 2018 12	Valladolid	0–0	Eibar	Valladolid
18:30 CET (UTC+01:00)	Nacho (yellow card) 41'; Calero (yellow card) 81'	Report	Arbilla (yellow card) 15' (yellow-red card) 73'; Peña (yellow card) 63'; Diop (yellow card) 87'	Stadium: José Zorrilla; Attendance: 16,136; Referee: Guillermo Cuadra Fernández

24 November 2018 13	Eibar	3–0	Real Madrid	Eibar
13:00 CET (UTC+01:00)	Escalante 16'; Cucurella (yellow card) 33'; Jordán (yellow card) 36'; Enrich 52'; Kike 57'	Report	Bale (yellow card) 44'	Stadium: Ipurua; Attendance: 6,458; Referee: Juan Martínez Munuera

30 November 2018 14	Rayo Vallecano	1–0	Eibar	Madrid
21:00 CET (UTC+01:00)	De Tomás (yellow card) 19'; Imbula (yellow card) 46'; Embarba 53'; Elustondo (yellow card) 67'; Trejo (yellow card) 75'; Moreno (yellow card) 80'	Report	Diop (yellow card) 38'; Jordán (yellow card) 60'; Peña (yellow card) 65'	Stadium: Vallecas; Attendance: 11,257; Referee: Alberto Undiano Mallenco

9 December 2018 15	Eibar	4–4	Levante	Eibar
12:00 CET (UTC+01:00)	Enrich 8'; Escalante 57', (yellow card) 77'; Charles 61' (pen.), 65'; José Ángel (yellow card) 90+1'	Report	Toño (yellow card) 1'; Morales 9'; Róber 25'; Oliveira 75' (o.g.); Campaña (yellow card) 82'; Mayoral 90+1'	Stadium: Ipurua; Attendance: 5,238; Referee: Javier Alberola Rojas

15 December 2018 16	Eibar	1–1	Valencia	Eibar
20:45 CET (UTC+01:00)	Charles 56' (pen.)	Report	Rodrigo 29', (yellow card) 78'	Stadium: Ipurua; Attendance: 4,491; Referee: Adrián Cordero Vega

22 December 2018 17	Real Betis	1–1	Eibar	Seville
13:00 CET (UTC+01:00)	Sanabria 21'; Lo Celso (yellow card) 57'; Feddal (yellow card) 71'	Report	Escalante (yellow card) 33'; Ramis (yellow card) 42'; Orellana 72' (pen.); Jordán (yellow card) 87'; Oliveira (yellow card) 88'	Stadium: Benito Villamarín; Attendance: 49,426; Referee: Carlos del Cerro Grande

6 January 2019 18	Eibar	0–0	Villarreal	Eibar
12:00 CET (UTC+01:00)		Report	Funes Mori (yellow card) 58'; Fuego (yellow card) 69'	Stadium: Ipurua; Attendance: 4,141; Referee: Santiago Jaime Latre

13 January 2019 19	Barcelona	3–0	Eibar	Barcelona
18:30 CET (UTC+01:00)	Suárez 19', 59', (yellow card) 44'; Messi 53'; Piqué (yellow card) 70'	Report	Enrich (yellow card) 42'	Stadium: Camp Nou; Attendance: 71,039; Referee: Jesús Gil Manzano

21 January 2019 20	Eibar	3–0	Espanyol	Eibar
21:00 CET (UTC+01:00)	Enrich 24', (yellow card) 86'; Jordán (yellow card) 28'; De Blasis 52'; Charles 84'	Report	Sánchez (yellow card) 18'; Vilà (yellow card) 40'; Baptistão (yellow card) 69'; Iglesias (yellow card) 85'; Granero (yellow card) 90+1'	Stadium: Ipurua; Attendance: 3,592; Referee: Juan Martínez Munuera

26 January 2019 21	Leganés	2–2	Eibar	Leganés
18:30 CET (UTC+01:00)	Siovas (yellow card) 35'; En-Nesyri 46', 67'; Recio (yellow card) 52'	Report	Kike 29'; Jordán 36'; Cucurella (yellow card) 38'; Dmitrović (yellow card) 66'; Charles (yellow card) 88'	Stadium: Municipal de Butarque; Attendance: 9,341; Referee: Alejandro Hernández Hernández

3 February 2019 22	Eibar	3–0	Girona	Eibar
18:30 CET (UTC+01:00)	Peña 37'; Diop (yellow card) 41'; Charles 46', 57' (pen.); Cucurella (yellow card) 90+2'	Report	Alcalá (yellow card) 9'	Stadium: Ipurua; Attendance: 4,419; Referee: José Luis González González

10 February 2019 23	Sevilla	2–2	Eibar	Seville
18:30 CET (UTC+01:00)	Escudero (yellow card) 39'; Banega (yellow card) 65' (yellow-red card) 84'; Ben Yedder 88'; Navas (yellow card) 88'; Sarabia 90+2'	Report	Orellana 22'; Jordán (yellow card) 52'; Charles 63'; José Ángel (yellow card) 88'	Stadium: Ramón Sánchez Pizjuán; Attendance: 36,343; Referee: Ignacio Iglesias Villanueva

15 February 2019 24	Eibar	2–2	Getafe	Eibar
21:00 CET (UTC+01:00)	Charles 67' (pen.), 80'; Diop (yellow card) 78'; Cucurella (yellow card) 90'	Report	Mata 37'; Djené (yellow card) 44'; Foulquier 52'	Stadium: Ipurua; Attendance: 4,449; Referee: David Medié Jiménez

23 February 2019 25	Athletic Bilbao	1–0	Eibar	Bilbao
20:45 CET (UTC+01:00)	García 1'; Yeray (yellow card) 13'; Beñat (yellow card) 55'; Martínez (yellow card) 83'	Report	Diop (yellow card) 45'; Oliveira (yellow card) 58'; Charles (yellow card) 77'; Arbilla (yellow card) 87'	Stadium: San Mamés; Attendance: 43,363; Referee: Mario Melero López

3 March 2019 26	Eibar	1–0	Celta Vigo	Eibar
12:00 CET (UTC+01:00)	José Ángel (yellow card) 74'; Enrich 87'	Report	Costas (yellow card) 37'	Stadium: Ipurua; Attendance: 4,682; Referee: Guillermo Cuadra Fernández

9 March 2019 27	Alavés	1–1	Eibar	Vitoria-Gasteiz
13:00 CET (UTC+01:00)	Marín (yellow card) 53'; Inui 58'	Report	Escalante (yellow card) 26'; Cardona 71'	Stadium: Mendizorrotza; Attendance: 18,793; Referee: Javier Alberola Rojas

17 March 2019 28	Eibar	1–2	Valladolid	Eibar
12:00 CET (UTC+01:00)	José Ángel (yellow card) 50'; Orellana 54', (yellow card) 90+2'; Dmitrović (yellow card) 90'; Cardona (yellow card) 90+7'	Report	Anuar (yellow card) 67'; Alcaraz (yellow card) 74'; Verde 90+1' (pen.); Guardiola 90+3'	Stadium: Ipurua; Attendance: 4,508; Referee: David Medié Jiménez

31 March 2019 29	Levante	2–2	Eibar	Valencia
12:00 CEST (UTC+02:00)	Morales 5'; Rochina 26'; Bardhi (yellow card) 40'; Vukčević (yellow card) 83'	Report	Escalante 19'; Enrich 78'; Cucurella (yellow card) 87'	Stadium: Ciutat de València; Attendance: 16,198; Referee: Eduardo Prieto Iglesias

3 April 2019 30	Eibar	2–1	Rayo Vallecano	Eibar
20:30 CEST (UTC+02:00)	Diop (yellow card) 51'; Charles 64'; León 73'; Peña (yellow card) 74'	Report	Pozo 40'; Moreno (yellow card) 76'; Amat (yellow card) 86'	Stadium: Ipurua; Attendance: 3,940; Referee: Alberto Undiano Mallenco

6 April 2019 31	Real Madrid	2–1	Eibar	Madrid
16:15 CEST (UTC+02:00)	Benzema 59', 81'	Report	Oliveira (yellow card) 21'; Cardona 39'	Stadium: Santiago Bernabéu; Attendance: 50,284; Referee: Pablo González Fuertes

14 April 2019 32	Real Sociedad	1–1	Eibar	San Sebastián
16:15 CEST (UTC+02:00)	Juanmi 1'; Llorente (yellow card) 39'; Pardo (yellow card) 87'	Report	De Blasis (yellow card) 33'; Jordán (yellow card) 55', (goal) 85'	Stadium: Anoeta; Attendance: 24,308; Referee: Santiago Jaime Latre

20 April 2019 33	Eibar	0–1	Atlético Madrid	Eibar
16:15 CEST (UTC+02:00)	Jordán (yellow card) 45'; José Ángel (yellow card) 62'; Enrich (yellow card) 69'	Report	Lemar 85'; Morata (yellow card) 90+1'	Stadium: Ipurua; Attendance: 4,750; Referee: Javier Alberola Rojas

23 April 2019 34	Huesca	2–0	Eibar	Huesca
19:30 CEST (UTC+02:00)	Gallego (yellow card) 24', (goal) 54'; Mantovani (yellow card) 37'; Ávila 57', (yellow card) 70'; Herrera (yellow card) 86'	Report	Diop (yellow card) 31'	Stadium: El Alcoraz; Attendance: 6,157; Referee: David Medié Jiménez

28 April 2019 35	Valencia	0–1	Eibar	Valencia
12:00 CEST (UTC+02:00)	Soler (yellow card) 58'; Roncaglia (yellow card) 60'	Report	José Ángel (yellow card) 70'; Charles (yellow card) 87', (goal) 90+3'; Álvarez (yellow card) 90+1'	Stadium: Mestalla; Attendance: 35,393; Referee: Xavier Estrada Fernández

5 May 2019 36	Eibar	1–0	Real Betis	Eibar
14:00 CEST (UTC+02:00)	José Ángel 45', (yellow card) 79'; Ramis (yellow card) 67'; Escalante (yellow card) 87'	Report	Bartra (yellow card) 54'; Tello (yellow card) 58'	Stadium: Ipurua; Attendance: 4,725; Referee: Ignacio Iglesias Villanueva

12 May 2019 37	Villarreal	1–0	Eibar	Villarreal
18:30 CEST (UTC+02:00)	Toko Ekambi 59'; Mario Gaspar (yellow card) 76'; Gerard (yellow card) 90+4'; Bacca (yellow card) 90+5'	Report	Cucurella (yellow card) 64'; José Ángel (yellow card) 90+4'	Stadium: Estadio de la Cerámica; Attendance: 17,901; Referee: Pablo González Fuertes

19 May 2019 38	Eibar	2–2	Barcelona	Eibar
16:15 CEST (UTC+02:00)	Cucurella 20'; Ramis (yellow card) 33'; De Blasis (yellow card) 44', (goal) 45'; José Ángel (yellow card) 80'; Escalante (yellow card) 83'	Report	Messi 31', 32'; Semedo (yellow card) 42'; Alba (yellow card) 83'	Stadium: Ipurua; Attendance: 5,145; Referee: José Luis Munuera Montero

=== Copa del Rey ===
==== Round of 32 ====
11 November 2018 First leg	Sporting Gijón	2–0	Eibar	Gijón
12:00 CET (UTC+01:00)	Đurđević 54'; Traver (yellow card) 58'; Manzambi 86'; Álvaro (yellow card) 90+1'	Report	Arbilla (yellow card) 89'; Milla (yellow card) 90+1'	Stadium: El Molinón; Attendance: 12,902; Referee: Santiago Jaime Latre

6 December 2018 Second leg	Eibar	2–2 (2–4 agg.)	Sporting Gijón	Eibar
18:30 CET (UTC+01:00)	Jordán (yellow card) 16'; Cucurella 53', (yellow card) 85'; Charles 87'	Report	Álvaro 13'; Berto Espeso (yellow card) 35'; Pablo Pérez 39'	Stadium: Ipurua; Attendance: 4,970; Referee: José Luis González González

== Statistics ==
=== Appearances and goals ===
Last updated on 19 May 2019.

No.	Pos	Nat	Player	Total		La Liga		Copa del Rey	
No.	Pos	Nat	Player	Apps	Goals	Apps	Goals	Apps	Goals
Goalkeepers
1	GK	(Serbia) SRB	Marko Dmitrović	24	0	24	0	0	0
13	GK	(Spain) ESP	Asier Riesgo	16	0	14	0	2	0
Defenders
2	DF	(Spain) ESP	Jordi Calavera	3	0	0+1	0	1+1	0
3	DF	(Spain) ESP	Pedro Bigas	12	0	7+3	0	2	0
4	DF	(Spain) ESP	Iván Ramis	22	0	20+1	0	1	0
12	DF	(Portugal) POR	Paulo Oliveira	29	0	24+4	0	0+1	0
15	DF	(Spain) ESP	José Ángel	36	1	34+1	1	0+1	0
20	DF	(Spain) ESP	Marc Cucurella	33	2	26+5	1	2	1
23	DF	(Spain) ESP	Anaitz Arbilla	27	1	22+3	1	1+1	0
Midfielders
5	MF	(Argentina) ARG	Gonzalo Escalante	32	4	18+14	4	0	0
6	MF	(Spain) ESP	Sergio Álvarez	21	0	12+7	0	2	0
8	MF	(Senegal) SEN	Pape Diop	29	1	27+1	1	1	0
11	MF	(Spain) ESP	Rubén Peña	32	1	30+1	1	1	0
14	MF	(Chile) CHI	Fabián Orellana	33	3	31+2	3	0	0
16	MF	(Argentina) ARG	Pablo de Blasis	25	2	16+8	2	0+1	0
21	MF	(Spain) ESP	Pedro León	9	1	5+4	1	0	0
22	MF	(Spain) ESP	Pere Milla	7	0	5	0	2	0
24	MF	(Spain) ESP	Joan Jordán	36	4	32+2	4	1+1	0
29	MF	(Spain) ESP	Miguel Marí	2	0	0+2	0	0	0
Forwards
7	FW	(Spain) ESP	Marc Cardona	19	3	6+11	3	2	0
9	FW	(Spain) ESP	Sergi Enrich	35	7	30+5	7	0	0
17	FW	(Spain) ESP	Kike	31	3	15+15	3	1	0
19	FW	(Brazil) BRA	Charles	36	15	17+17	14	1+1	1
Players who have made an appearance or had a squad number this season but have left the club
18	MF	(Spain) ESP	Pablo Hervías	5	0	2+1	0	2	0
