= 2016–17 Getafe CF season =

Getafe CF
2016–17 season
- President: Ángel Torres
- Head coach: Juan Esnáider (until 26 September); José Bordalás (from 27 September)
- Stadium: Coliseum Alfonso Pérez
- Segunda División: 3rd (promoted via play-offs)
- Copa del Rey: Second round
- Top goalscorer: League: Jorge Molina (20); All: Jorge Molina (22)
Home colours	Away colours

The 2016–17 season was the 34th season in Getafe CF 's history.

== Squad ==
As of 1 February 2017

Note: Flags indicate national team as defined under FIFA eligibility rules; some limited exceptions apply. Players may hold more than one non-FIFA nationality.

No.	Pos.	Nation	Player
1	GK	(Spain) ESP	Alberto García
2	DF	(Spain) ESP	Carlos Peña
4	MF	(Argentina) ARG	Alejandro Faurlín
5	MF	(Romania) ROU	Paul Anton (on loan from Dinamo București)
6	DF	(Argentina) ARG	Cata Díaz (2nd captain)
7	FW	(Argentina) ARG	Emi Buendía
8	MF	(Algeria) ALG	Mehdi Lacen (captain)
10	FW	(Serbia) SRB	Stefan Šćepović
11	FW	(Spain) ESP	Chuli (on loan from Almería)
12	MF	(Spain) ESP	Francisco Portillo (on loan from Real Betis)
13	GK	(Spain) ESP	Vicente Guaita

No.	Pos.	Nation	Player
14	MF	(Spain) ESP	David Fuster
15	DF	(Spain) ESP	Francisco Molinero
16	DF	(Spain) ESP	Cala
17	DF	(Argentina) ARG	Nicolás Gorosito
18	MF	(Argentina) ARG	Facundo Castillón (on loan from Racing Club)
19	FW	(Spain) ESP	Jorge Molina
20	MF	(Spain) ESP	Dani Pacheco (on loan from Real Betis)
22	DF	(Uruguay) URU	Damián Suárez
23	MF	(Spain) ESP	Álvaro (on loan from Real Madrid)
25	MF	(Spain) ESP	Sergio Mora

== Competitions ==
=== Overall ===
Competition	Final position
Segunda División	3rd
Copa del Rey	2nd round

=== Liga ===
==== League table ====
Pos	Team	Pld	W	D	L	GF	GA	GD	Pts	Promotion, qualification or relegation
1	Levante (C, P)	42	25	9	8	57	32	+25	84	Promotion to La Liga
2	Girona (P)	42	20	10	12	65	45	+20	70	Promotion to La Liga
3	Getafe (O, P)	42	18	14	10	55	43	+12	68	Qualification to promotion play-offs
4	Tenerife	42	16	18	8	50	37	+13	66	Qualification to promotion play-offs
5	Cádiz	42	16	16	10	55	40	+15	64	Qualification to promotion play-offs

Source: La Liga
Rules for classification: 1) points; 2) head-to-head points; 3) head-to-head goal difference; 4) goal difference; 5) number of goals scored
(C) Champions; (O) Play-off winners; (P) Promoted
