= Carlos Cordero =

Carlos Cordero may refer to:

- Carlos Cordero (runner) (born 1977), Mexican athlete
- Carlos Cordero (footballer) (born 1996), Spanish footballer
