= Pelayo Morilla =

Spanish footballer

Personal information
- Full name: Pelayo Morilla Cabal
- Date of birth: 12 July 2001 (age 25)
- Place of birth: Oviedo, Spain
- Height: 1.80 m (5 ft 11 in)
- Position: Winger

Youth career
- –2018: Sporting Gijón

Senior career*
Years	Team	Apps	(Gls)
2018–2024	Sporting de Gijón B	37	(2)
2018–2024	Sporting Gijón	3	(0)
2021–2022	→ Algeciras (loan)	5	(1)
2024	Teruel	1	(1)

International career
2018	Spain U17	2	(0)
2018–2019	Spain U18	9	(2)
2018	Spain U19	2	(1)
2019	Spain U20	1	(0)
- * Club domestic league appearances and goals as of 1 September 2024

Pelayo Morilla Cabal (born 12 July 2001) is a Spanish retired footballer who played as a right winger, last played for Teruel.

== Club career ==
Born in Oviedo, Asturias, Morilla was a Sporting de Gijón youth graduate. On 21 September 2017, while still a youth, he signed a professional five-year deal with the club.

Morilla made his senior debut with the reserves on 7 January 2018, coming on as a late substitute in a 5–3 Segunda División B away win against Gernika Club. He made his first-team debut on 18 August, replacing Pablo Pérez in a 1–1 away draw against AD Alcorcón in the Segunda División.

On 14 September 2018, Morilla scored his first goal, netting a free kick for the 2–0 in a 2–1 away win in that season's Copa del Rey against Numancia. On 21 July 2021, after featuring mainly for the B-side, he was loaned to Primera División RFEF side Algeciras CF for the campaign.
