= Cristian Salvador =

Spanish footballer

Personal information
- Full name: Cristian Salvador González
- Date of birth: 20 November 1994 (age 32)
- Place of birth: Zamora, Spain
- Height: 1.84 m (6 ft 0 in)
- Position: Midfielder

Team information
- Current team: Tianjin Jinmen Tiger
- Number: 10

Youth career
- Zamora

Senior career*
Years	Team	Apps	(Gls)
2012–2015	Zamora	61	(3)
2015–2016	Sestao	29	(0)
2016–2018	Sporting B	65	(7)
2016–2021	Sporting Gijón	71	(1)
2021–2023	Huesca	49	(1)
2023–2025	Elche	30	(0)
2025–	Tianjin Jinmen Tiger	38	(2)
- * Club domestic league appearances and goals as of 22 November 2026

Cristian Salvador González (born 20 November 1994) is a Spanish footballer who plays as a central midfielder for Chinese club Tianjin Jinmen Tiger.

== Club career ==
Born in Zamora, Castile and León, Salvador represented Zamora CF as a youth. On 7 April 2012, aged only 17, he made his senior debut by starting in a 2–0 home win against Sestao River in the Segunda División B championship.

Salvador was promoted to the first team ahead of the 2012–13 season, and began to appear more regularly in the following campaigns. He scored his first senior goal on 5 January 2014, netting the equalizer in a 1–1 home draw against CD Guijuelo.

On 31 July 2015, after Zamora's relegation, Salvador joined fellow third-tier club CD Lealtad. However, Zamora announced that they retained the player seven days later, but he signed for Sestao on 1 September after rescinding his contract.

On 28 July 2016 Salvador moved to Sporting de Gijón, being initially assigned to the reserves in Tercera División. He made his first team debut on 21 December, coming on as a late substitute for Nacho Cases in a 1–3 away loss against SD Eibar for the season's Copa del Rey.

Salvador was definitely promoted to the main squad in Segunda División ahead of the 2018–19 season, after agreeing to a new three-year contract. He scored his first professional goal on 3 March 2019, netting the opener in a 2–1 away success over CD Numancia.

On 7 June 2021, Salvador signed a three-year deal with SD Huesca also in the second division. On 31 July 2023, he moved to fellow league team Elche CF on a two-year contract.

On 10 January 2025, Elche announced the transfer of Salvador to Chinese club Tianjin Jinmen Tiger FC.

== Career statistics ==
As of match played 22 November 2025

Appearances and goals by club, season and competition
Club	Season	League			National Cup		Other		Total	
Club	Season	Division	Apps	Goals	Apps	Goals	Apps	Goals	Apps	Goals
Zamora	2011–12	Segunda División B	1	0	0	0	—		1	0
Zamora	2012–13	Segunda División B	11	0	0	0	—		11	0
Zamora	2013–14	Segunda División B	16	2	0	0	—		16	2
Zamora	2014–15	Segunda División B	33	1	1	0	—		34	1
Zamora	Total		61	3	1	0	—		62	1
Sestao River	2015–16	Segunda División B	29	0	0	0	—		29	0
Sporting Gijón B	2016–17	Tercera División	33	4	—		5 (Note: Appearances in Tercera División play-offs)	0	38	4
Sporting Gijón B	2017–18	Segunda División B	32	3	—		4 (Note: Appearances in Segunda División B play-offs)	1	36	4
Sporting Gijón B	Total		65	7	—		9	1	74	8
Sporting Gijón	2016–17	La Liga	0	0	1	0	—		1	0
Sporting Gijón	2018–19	Segunda División	30	1	3	0	—		33	1
Sporting Gijón	2019–20	Segunda División	29	0	1	0	—		30	0
Sporting Gijón	2020–21	Segunda División	12	0	2	1	—		14	1
Sporting Gijón	Total		71	1	7	1	—		78	2
Huesca	2021–22	Segunda División	21	1	0	0	—		21	1
Huesca	2022–23	Segunda División	28	0	1	0	—		29	0
Huesca	Total		49	1	1	0	—		50	1
Elche	2023–24	Segunda División	19	0	2	0	—		21	0
Elche	2024–25	Segunda División	11	0	2	0	—		13	0
Elche	Total		30	0	4	0	—		34	0
Tianjin Jinmen Tiger	2025	Chinese Super League	24	1	1	0	—		25	1
Career total			317	13	12	0	9	1	338	14
