= Dani Martín (footballer, born 1998) =

Spanish footballer

Personal information
- Full name: Daniel Martín Fernández
- Date of birth: 8 July 1998 (age 28)
- Place of birth: Gijón, Spain
- Height: 1.87 m (6 ft 2 in)
- Position: Goalkeeper

Team information
- Current team: Tenerife
- Number: 1

Youth career
- Sporting Gijón

Senior career*
Years	Team	Apps	(Gls)
2016–2018	Sporting B	63	(0)
2017–2019	Sporting Gijón	4	(0)
2019–2023	Betis	6	(0)
2021–2022	→ Málaga (loan)	28	(0)
2023–2024	Andorra	16	(0)
2024–2025	Eldense	22	(0)
2025–	Tenerife	34	(0)

International career
2014–2015	Spain U17	4	(0)
2016–2017	Spain U19	4	(0)
2016	Spain U20	2	(0)
2019	Spain U21	3	(0)
- * Club domestic league appearances and goals as of 9 June 2026

Daniel Martín Fernández (born 8 July 1998) is a Spanish professional footballer who plays as a goalkeeper for CD Tenerife.

== Club career ==
Born in Gijón, Asturias, Martín represented Sporting de Gijón as a youth. Promoted to the reserves ahead of the 2016–17 season, he made his senior debut on 21 August 2016 by starting in a 7–0 Tercera División home routing of UC Ceares.

Martín made his first-team debut on 19 September 2017, starting and making several key stops which included a penalty kick, in a 1–1 home draw against CD Numancia, for the season's Copa del Rey (1–3 loss on penalties). Late in the month, he extended his contract until 2021 and being definitely promoted to the main squad for the following campaign.

Martín made his league debut at RCD Mallorca, replacing injured Diego Mariño in a match were Sporting was defeated by 1–2 in extra time. He contributed with four league appearances during the campaign, acting mainly as a backup to Mariño.

On 18 July 2019, Martín joined La Liga side Real Betis on a five-year deal. He made his debut in the Spanish top tier on 18 August, coming on as a first-half substitute for field player Joaquín in a 1–2 home loss against Real Valladolid, after Joel Robles was sent off.

Martín was mainly a backup to Joel during his first season, where he featured in eight matches overall, but was demoted to third-choice in his second after the arrival of Claudio Bravo. On 30 July 2021, after falling down further in the pecking order due to the arrival of Rui Silva, he moved to Málaga CF in the second division on a one-year loan deal.

On 17 July 2023, Martín signed a two-year deal with FC Andorra in division two. Roughly one year later, after suffering relegation, he agreed to a one-year contract with CD Eldense of the same category.

On 30 June 2025, after another relegation, Martín signed a three-year deal with CD Tenerife, which also dropped down a division.

== Career statistics ==
=== Club ===
As of match played 19 July 2020

Appearances and goals by club, season and competition
Club	Season	League			National Cup		Other		Total	
Club	Season	Division	Apps	Goals	Apps	Goals	Apps	Goals	Apps	Goals
Sporting B	2016–17	Tercera Divisíon	30	0	—		6 (Note: Appearance(s) in Promotion Playoffs)	0	36	0
Sporting B	2017–18	Segunda Divisíon B	33	0	—		4	0	37	0
Sporting B	Total		63	0	0	0	10	0	73	0
Sporting Gijón	2017–18	Segunda Divisíon	0	0	1	0	—		1	0
Sporting Gijón	2018–19	Segunda Divisíon	4	0	5	0	—		9	0
Sporting Gijón	Total		4	0	6	0	0	0	10	0
Betis	2019–20	La Liga	6	0	2	0	—		8	0
Betis	2020–21	La Liga	0	0	0	0	—		0	0
Betis	Total		6	0	2	0	0	0	8	0
Málaga (loan)	2021–22	Segunda Divisíon	0	0	0	0	—		0	0
Career total			73	0	8	0	10	0	91	0

== Honours ==
Spain U21

- UEFA European Under-21 Championship: 2019
