= Francisco Molinero =

Spanish footballer

Personal information
- Full name: Francisco José Molinero Calderón
- Date of birth: 26 July 1985 (age 41)
- Place of birth: Ontígola, Spain
- Height: 1.75 m (5 ft 9 in)
- Position: Right-back

Youth career
- Atlético Madrid

Senior career*
Years	Team	Apps	(Gls)
2002–2004	Atlético Madrid B	50	(2)
2004–2007	Atlético Madrid	25	(0)
2006–2007	→ Málaga (loan)	16	(0)
2007–2008	Mallorca	5	(0)
2008–2009	Levante	24	(1)
2009–2010	Dinamo București	16	(0)
2010–2011	Huesca	37	(1)
2011–2014	Murcia	114	(4)
2014–2016	Betis	58	(1)
2016–2018	Getafe	43	(0)
2018–2020	Sporting Gijón	59	(0)
2021	Murcia	13	(0)
2021–2022	Mar Menor	32	(4)
Total		492	(13)

International career
2001–2003	Spain U17	16	(0)
2003	Spain U18	3	(1)
2004	Spain U19	1	(0)
2003–2005	Spain U20	5	(1)
2006	Spain U21	2	(0)
- * Club domestic league appearances and goals

Francisco José Molinero Calderón (born 26 July 1985) is a Spanish former professional footballer who played as a right-back.

== Club career ==
Molinero was born in Ontígola, Province of Toledo, Castilla–La Mancha. After spending two La Liga seasons at Atlético Madrid (his first game being on 25 September 2004, featuring the full 90 minutes of a 1–0 home win over Villarreal CF), in whose youth system he grew, he served a Segunda División loan stint at Málaga CF.

In July 2007, the free agent Molinero joined RCD Mallorca on a two-year deal. He appeared sparingly throughout the season, moving the following campaign to Levante UD, recently relegated to the second division.

Molinero signed with Romania's FC Dinamo București on 21 July 2009, leaving Spain for the first time in his career. On 27 August, he took the field for the second leg of the play-off round in the UEFA Europa League against FC Slovan Liberec, winning 3–0 away and advancing on penalties. He spent only one year in Liga I, however, cancelling his three-year contract in the summer and returning to his country with second-tier club SD Huesca.

In the 2011 off-season, Molinero joined Real Murcia CF for three years. On 26 June 2014, having never appeared in less than 37 league matches, he moved to Real Betis also in division two; he achieved promotion in 2015, contributing one goal to the feat.

On 25 June 2016, Molinero signed a two-year contract with Getafe CF. He returned to the second tier in July 2018, with the 33-year-old agreeing to a deal at Sporting de Gijón.

== Career statistics ==
As of match played 9 May 2021

Appearances and goals by club, season and competition
Club	Season	League			National Cup		Continental		Other		Total	
Club	Season	Division	Apps	Goals	Apps	Goals	Apps	Goals	Apps	Goals	Apps	Goals
Atlético Madrid B	2002–03	Segunda División B	8	0	—		—		—		8	0
Atlético Madrid B	2003–04	Segunda División B	34	1	—		—		4 (Note: Appearances in promotion playoffs)	1	38	2
Atlético Madrid B	2004–05	Segunda División B	8	1	—		—		—		8	1
Atlético Madrid B	Total		50	2	0	0	0	0	4	1	54	3
Atlético Madrid	2004–05	La Liga	14	0	4	0	—		—		18	0
Atlético Madrid	2005–06	La Liga	11	0	2	0	—		—		13	0
Atlético Madrid	Total		25	0	6	0	0	0	0	0	31	0
Málaga (loan)	2006–07	Segunda División	16	0	3	0	—		—		19	0
Mallorca	2007–08	La Liga	5	0	1	0	—		—		6	0
Levante	2008–09	Segunda División	24	1	1	0	—		—		25	1
Dinamo București	2009–10	Liga I	16	0	3	0	3 (Note: Appearances in UEFA Europa League)	0	—		22	0
Huesca	2010–11	Segunda División	37	1	1	0	—		—		38	1
Murcia	2011–12	Segunda División	37	2	0	0	—		—		37	2
Murcia	2012–13	Segunda División	37	1	0	0	—		—		37	1
Murcia	2013–14	Segunda División	40	1	0	0	—		2	0	42	1
Murcia	Total		114	4	0	0	0	0	2	0	116	4
Betis	2014–15	Segunda División	37	1	2	0	—		—		39	1
Betis	2015–16	La Liga	21	0	2	0	—		—		23	0
Betis	Total		58	1	4	0	0	0	0	0	62	1
Getafe	2016–17	Segunda División	33	0	1	0	—		4	0	38	0
Getafe	2017–18	La Liga	10	0	2	0	—		—		12	0
Getafe	Total		43	0	3	0	0	0	4	0	50	0
Sporting Gijón	2018–19	Segunda División	27	0	4	0	—		—		31	0
Sporting Gijón	2019–20	Segunda División	32	0	0	0	—		—		32	0
Sporting Gijón	Total		59	0	4	0	0	0	0	0	63	0
Murcia	2020–21	Segunda División B	13	0	0	0	—		—		13	0
Career total			460	9	26	0	3	0	10	1	499	10

== Honours ==
Betis

- Segunda División: 2014–15
