= List of Spanish football transfers winter 2018–19 =

This is a list of Spanish football transfers for the winter sale in the 2018–19 season of La Liga and Segunda División. Only moves from La Liga and Segunda División are listed.

The winter transfer window opened on 1 January 2019, although a few transfers took place prior to that date. The window closed at midnight on 31 January 2019. Players without a club can join one at any time, either during or in between transfer windows. Clubs below La Liga level can also sign players on loan at any time. If need be, clubs can sign a goalkeeper on an emergency loan, if all others are unavailable.

== Winter 2018–19 transfer window ==
Date	Name	Moving from	Moving to	Fee
3 September 2018	(Spain) Raúl Baena	(Spain) Granada	(Australia) Melbourne Victory	Loan
8 October 2018	(Brazil) Michel	(Spain) Las Palmas	(Brazil) Corinthians	Free
19 November 2018	(Spain) Aarón Ñíguez	(Spain) Oviedo	(Malaysia) Johor Darul Ta'zim	Free
20 November 2018	(Spain) Imanol García	(Spain) Osasuna	(Spain) Gimnàstic	Loan
23 November 2018	(Spain) Paco Alcácer	(Germany) Borussia Dortmund	(Spain) Barcelona	Loan return
23 November 2018	(Spain) Paco Alcácer	(Spain) Barcelona	(Germany) Borussia Dortmund	€23M
26 November 2018	(Spain) Derik Osede	Unattached	(Spain) Numancia	Free
4 December 2018	(Spain) Omar Ramos	Unattached	(Spain) Oviedo	Free
10 December 2018	(Spain) Alberto Guitián	(Spain) Valladolid	(Spain) Zaragoza	Free
10 December 2018	(Ecuador) Stiven Plaza	(Ecuador) Independiente del Valle	(Spain) Valladolid	€2M
13 December 2018	(Poland) Przemysław Tytoń	(Spain) Deportivo La Coruña	(United States) Cincinnati	Free
17 December 2018	(Mexico) Miguel Rebollo	(Spain) Águilas	(Spain) Alcorcón	Undisclosed
17 December 2018	(Spain) Samuel Sáiz	(England) Leeds United	(Spain) Getafe	Loan
18 December 2018	(France) Mathieu Flamini	Unattached	(Spain) Getafe	Free
18 December 2018	(Spain) Francisco Sandaza	(China) Qingdao Huanghai	(Spain) Alcorcón	Free
18 December 2018	(Senegal) Ousseynou Thioune	(Morocco) Ittihad Tanger	(Spain) Gimnàstic	Free
19 December 2018	(Spain) Tito	(Spain) Reus	Unattached	Free
20 December 2018	(Colombia) Jeison Murillo	(Spain) Valencia	(Spain) Barcelona	Loan
27 December 2018	(Spain) Nacho Gil	(Spain) Valencia	(Spain) Elche	Loan
28 December 2018	(Spain) Fran Carbià	(Spain) Reus	Unattached	Free
28 December 2018	(Portugal) Vítor Silva	(Spain) Reus	Unattached	Free
28 December 2018	(United States) Shaq Moore	(Spain) Reus	(Spain) Atlético Levante	Loan return
28 December 2018	(Venezuela) Mikel Villanueva	(Spain) Reus	(Spain) Málaga	Loan return
30 December 2018	(Brazil) Aderlan Santos	(Brazil) São Paulo	(Spain) Valencia	Loan return
30 December 2018	(Brazil) Aderlan Santos	(Spain) Valencia	(Brazil) Vitória	Loan
30 December 2018	(Spain) Jon Ander Serantes	(Spain) Leganés	(Japan) Avispa Fukuoka	Free
1 January 2019	(Colombia) Luis Muriel	(Spain) Sevilla	(Italy) Fiorentina	Loan
2 January 2019	(Argentina) Cristian Espinoza	(Argentina) Boca Juniors	(Spain) Villarreal	Loan return
2 January 2019	(Argentina) Cristian Espinoza	(Spain) Villarreal	(United States) San Jose Earthquakes	Loan
2 January 2019	(Chile) Manuel Iturra	(Spain) Villarreal	Unattached	Free
2 January 2019	(Spain) Pipa	(Spain) Espanyol	(Spain) Gimnàstic	Loan
3 January 2019	(Denmark) Martin Braithwaite	(England) Middlesbrough	(Spain) Leganés	Loan
4 January 2019	(Portugal) Salvador Agra	(Spain) Cádiz	(Portugal) Benfica	Loan return
4 January 2019	(Brazil) Paulinho	(China) Guangzhou Evergrande	(Spain) Barcelona	Loan return
4 January 2019	(Brazil) Paulinho	(Spain) Barcelona	(China) Guangzhou Evergrande	€42M
4 January 2019	(Italy) Nicola Sansone	(Spain) Villarreal	(Italy) Bologna	Loan
4 January 2019	(Italy) Roberto Soriano	(Spain) Villarreal	(Italy) Bologna	Loan
5 January 2019	(Spain) Édgar Badía	(Spain) Reus	(Spain) Elche	Free
6 January 2019	(Spain) Brahim Díaz	(England) Manchester City	(Spain) Real Madrid	£15.5M
7 January 2019	(Spain) Vicente Iborra	(England) Leicester City	(Spain) Villarreal	Undisclosed
8 January 2019	(Honduras) Bryan Acosta	(Spain) Tenerife	(United States) Dallas	$3.2M
9 January 2019	(Argentina) Mauro dos Santos	(Spain) Leganés	(Spain) Tenerife	Free
9 January 2019	(Romania) Cristian Ganea	(Spain) Athletic Bilbao	(Spain) Numancia	Loan
9 January 2019	(Mexico) Diego Lainez	(Mexico) América	(Spain) Betis	$14M
9 January 2019	(Spain) Borja Lasso	(Spain) Sevilla	(Spain) Tenerife	Free
10 January 2019	(Spain) Ibai Gómez	(Spain) Alavés	(Spain) Athletic Bilbao	Undisclosed
10 January 2019	(Turkey) Serdar Gürler	(Spain) Huesca	(Turkey) Göztepe	Loan
11 January 2019	(Spain) Munir El Haddadi	(Spain) Barcelona	(Spain) Sevilla	€1M
11 January 2019	(Spain) Lluís Sastre	(Spain) Huesca	(Cyprus) AEK Larnaca	Undisclosed
13 January 2019	(Ukraine) Vasyl Kravets	(Spain) Lugo	(Spain) Leganés	€2.5M
13 January 2019	(Spain) Dani Ojeda	(Spain) Leganés	(Spain) Granada	Loan
14 January 2019	(Spain) Samu García	(Spain) Levante	Unattached	Free
15 January 2019	(Spain) Raúl García	(Spain) Leganés	(Spain) Girona	Free
15 January 2019	(Albania) Armando Sadiku	(Spain) Levante	(Switzerland) Lugano	Undisclosed
16 January 2019	(Venezuela) Yangel Herrera	(England) Manchester City	(Spain) Huesca	Loan
16 January 2019	(Austria) Maximilian Wöber	(Netherlands) Ajax	(Spain) Sevilla	Loan
17 January 2019	(Spain) Kiko Casilla	(Spain) Real Madrid	(England) Leeds United	Free
17 January 2019	(Bosnia and Herzegovina) Ermedin Demirović	(France) Sochaux	(Spain) Alavés	Loan return
17 January 2019	(Bosnia and Herzegovina) Ermedin Demirović	(Spain) Alavés	(Spain) Almería	Loan
17 January 2019	(Spain) Enric Gallego	(Spain) Extremadura	(Spain) Huesca	€3M
17 January 2019	(Spain) Nando	(France) Sochaux	(Spain) Alavés	Loan return
17 January 2019	(Spain) Nando	(Spain) Alavés	(Spain) Extremadura	Loan
21 January 2019	(Ghana) Kevin-Prince Boateng	(Italy) Sassuolo	(Spain) Barcelona	Loan
22 January 2019	(Netherlands) Wesley Hoedt	(England) Southampton	(Spain) Celta Vigo	Loan
23 January 2019	(Guinea) Lass Bangoura	(Spain) Rayo Vallecano	(Canada) Vancouver Whitecaps	Loan
23 January 2019	(Spain) Pablo Hervías	(Spain) Eibar	(Spain) Valladolid	Loan
23 January 2019	(Portugal) André Moreira	(England) Aston Villa	(Spain) Atlético Madrid	Loan return
23 January 2019	(Portugal) André Moreira	(Spain) Atlético Madrid	(Portugal) Feirense	Loan
24 January 2019	(Japan) Takashi Inui	(Spain) Real Betis	(Spain) Alavés	Loan
25 January 2019	(Spain) Sergi Guardiola	(Spain) Córdoba	(Spain) Valladolid	€5M
25 January 2019	(Uruguay) Mathías Olivera	(Spain) Albacete	(Spain) Getafe	Loan return
27 January 2019	(Portugal) Gelson Martins	(Spain) Atlético Madrid	(France) Monaco	Loan
27 January 2019	(Spain) Álvaro Morata	(England) Chelsea	(Spain) Atlético Madrid	Loan
28 January 2019	(China) Wu Lei	(China) Shanghai SIPG	(Spain) Espanyol	€2M
28 January 2019	(Slovakia) Róbert Mazáň	(Spain) Celta Vigo	(Italy) Venezia	Loan
29 January 2019	(Spain) Robert Ibáñez	(Spain) Getafe	(Spain) Osasuna	Loan
29 January 2019	(Republic of the Congo) Merveil Ndockyt	(Spain) Mallorca	(Spain) Getafe	Loan return
29 January 2019	(Spain) Andrés Prieto	(Spain) Málaga	(Spain) Leganés	Free
29 January 2019	(Portugal) Rúben Vezo	(Spain) Valencia	(Spain) Levante	Loan
30 January 2019	(Venezuela) Josua Mejías	(Spain) Gimnàstic	(Spain) Leganés	Loan return
30 January 2019	(Venezuela) Josua Mejías	(Spain) Leganés	(Spain) Cartagena	Loan
30 January 2019	(Spain) Denis Suárez	(Spain) Barcelona	(England) Arsenal	Loan
31 January 2019	(Spain) Iván Alejo	(Spain) Getafe	(Spain) Málaga	Loan
31 January 2019	(Paraguay) Júnior Alonso	(Spain) Celta Vigo	(France) Lille	Loan return
31 January 2019	(Brazil) Léo Baptistão	(Spain) Espanyol	(China) Wuhan Zall	€5M
31 January 2019	(Spain) Álex Blanco	(Spain) Valencia Mestalla	(Spain) Alavés	Loan
31 January 2019	(Algeria) Ryad Boudebouz	(Spain) Real Betis	(Spain) Celta Vigo	Loan
31 January 2019	(Spain) Adrián Diéguez	(Spain) Alavés	(Spain) Huesca	Loan
31 January 2019	(Germany) Dennis Eckert	(Spain) Celta Vigo	(Netherlands) Excelsior	Loan
31 January 2019	(Argentina) Facundo Ferreyra	(Portugal) Benfica	(Spain) Espanyol	Loan
31 January 2019	(Spain) Ivi	(Spain) Valladolid	(Spain) Levante	Loan return
31 January 2019	(Spain) Ivi	(Spain) Levante	(Spain) Sporting Gijón	Loan
31 January 2019	(Spain) Jonny	(England) Wolverhampton Wanderers	(Spain) Atlético Madrid	Loan return
31 January 2019	(Spain) Jonny	(Spain) Atlético Madrid	(England) Wolverhampton Wanderers	€20M
31 January 2019	(Bosnia and Herzegovina) Kenan Kodro	(Denmark) Copenhagen	(Spain) Athletic Bilbao	Undisclosed
31 January 2019	(Republic of the Congo) Merveil Ndockyt	(Spain) Getafe	(Spain) Barcelona B	Loan
31 January 2019	(Uruguay) Lucas Olaza	(Argentina) Boca Juniors	(Spain) Celta Vigo	Loan
31 January 2019	(Argentina) Nehuén Pérez	(Argentina) Argentinos Juniors	(Spain) Atlético Madrid	Loan return
31 January 2019	(Mexico) Diego Reyes	(Turkey) Fenerbahçe	(Spain) Leganés	Loan
31 January 2019	(Uruguay) Diego Rolán	(Spain) Leganés	(Spain) Deportivo La Coruña	Loan return
31 January 2019	(Uruguay) Diego Rolán	(Spain) Deportivo La Coruña	(Spain) Alavés	Loan
31 January 2019	(Argentina) Facundo Roncaglia	(Spain) Celta Vigo	(Spain) Valencia	Loan
31 January 2019	(Spain) Rubén Sobrino	(Spain) Alavés	(Spain) Valencia	€5M
31 January 2019	(France) Jean-Clair Todibo	(France) Toulouse	(Spain) Barcelona	Undisclosed
31 January 2019	(Colombia) Daniel Torres	(Spain) Alavés	(Spain) Albacete	Loan
