= Juan Rodríguez (footballer, born 1995) =

Spanish footballer (born 1995)

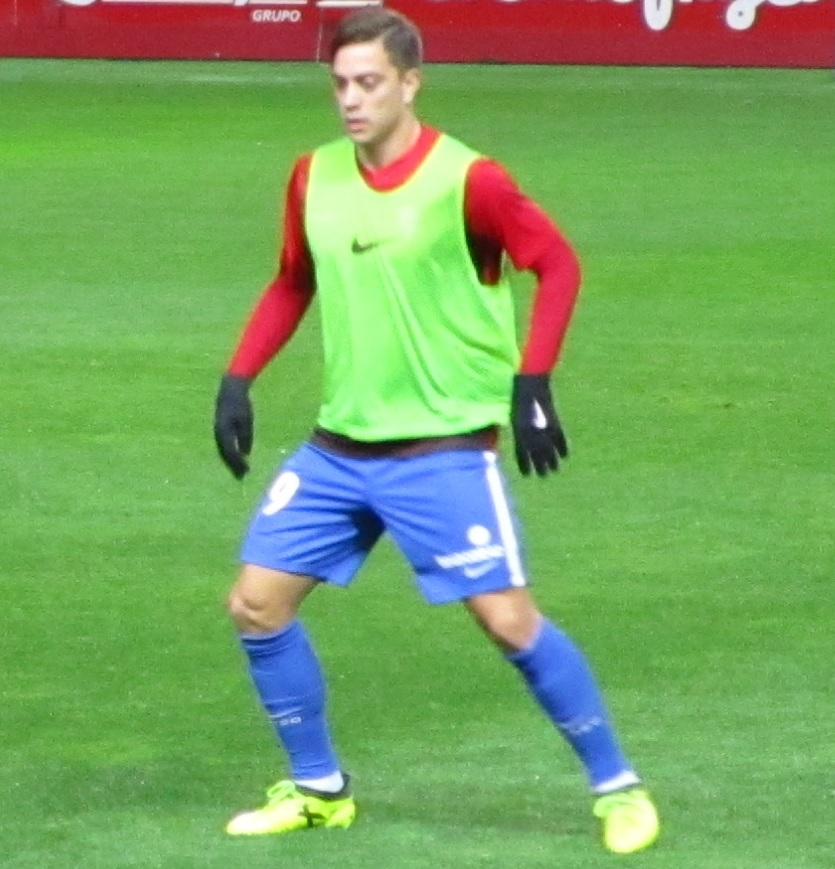
- Rodríguez with Sporting Gijón in 2017

Personal information
- Full name: Juan Rodríguez Martínez
- Date of birth: 8 May 1995 (age 31)
- Place of birth: Cedeira, Spain
- Height: 1.77 m (5 ft 9 1/2 in)
- Position: Centre back

Team information
- Current team: Marbella
- Number: 22

Youth career
- 2009–2010: Cedeira
- 2010–2013: Racing Ferrol

Senior career*
| Years | Team | Apps | (Gls) |
| 2012–2014 | Racing Ferrol | 4 | (0) |
| 2013–2014 | Galicia Mugardos | 28 | (1) |
| 2014–2015 | Arosa | 35 | (0) |
| 2015–2016 | Somozas | 28 | (0) |
| 2016–2018 | Sporting B | 45 | (2) |
| 2016–2019 | Sporting Gijón | 13 | (0) |
| 2019–2020 | Gimnàstic | 28 | (2) |
| 2020–2022 | San Fernando | 42 | (0) |
| 2022–2023 | Amorebieta | 25 | (1) |
| 2023–2024 | Algeciras | 35 | (2) |
| 2024–2025 | Lugo | 36 | (3) |
| 2025–2026 | Kerala Blasters | 0 | (0) |
| 2026– | Marbella | 17 | (1) |
- * Club domestic league appearances and goals as of 10 June 2026

Juan Rodríguez Martínez (born 8 May 1995) is a Spanish footballer who plays as a center back for Primera Federación club Marbella. Mainly a central defender, he can also play as a defensive midfielder.

== Club career ==
Born on 8 May 1995, in Cedeira, Rodríguez joined Racing de Ferrol's youth setup in 2010, from hometown club Cedeira SD. He made his senior debut on 1 December 2012, coming on as a late substitute for Manu Barreiro in a 4–1 away routing of Narón BP in the Tercera División.

Rodríguez appeared only rarely for Racing in the following years, spending a full season with the reserves in the regional leagues. He left the club in 2014, and joined fourth tier side Arosa SC on 17 July of that year.

After being an undisputed starter during the campaign, Rodríguez joined UD Somozas of the Segunda División B on 7 July 2015. The following 24 June, he signed a two-year deal with another reserve team, Sporting de Gijón B in the fourth division.

Rodríguez made his first-team – and La Liga – debut on 22 October 2016, starting in a 0–0 away draw against Granada CF. Ahead of the 2018–19 season, he was definitely promoted to the main squad after agreeing to a new two-year contract.

On 29 July 2019, Rodríguez agreed to a two-year deal with Gimnàstic de Tarragona in the third division, after terminating his link with Sporting. He left the club by mutual agreement on 24 August of the following year, and agreed to a three-year deal with fellow league team San Fernando CD just hours later.

On 19 August 2022, Rodríguez joined SD Amorebieta in Primera Federación. He featured in 25 matches during the campaign, as the club returned to Segunda División at first attempt.

On 9 October 2025, Rodríguez joined Kerala Blasters in India.

On 14 January 2026, Rodríguez returned to Spain and signed with Marbella in the third tier until the end of the 2025–26 season.
