= André Sousa (footballer, born 1990) =

Portuguese footballer

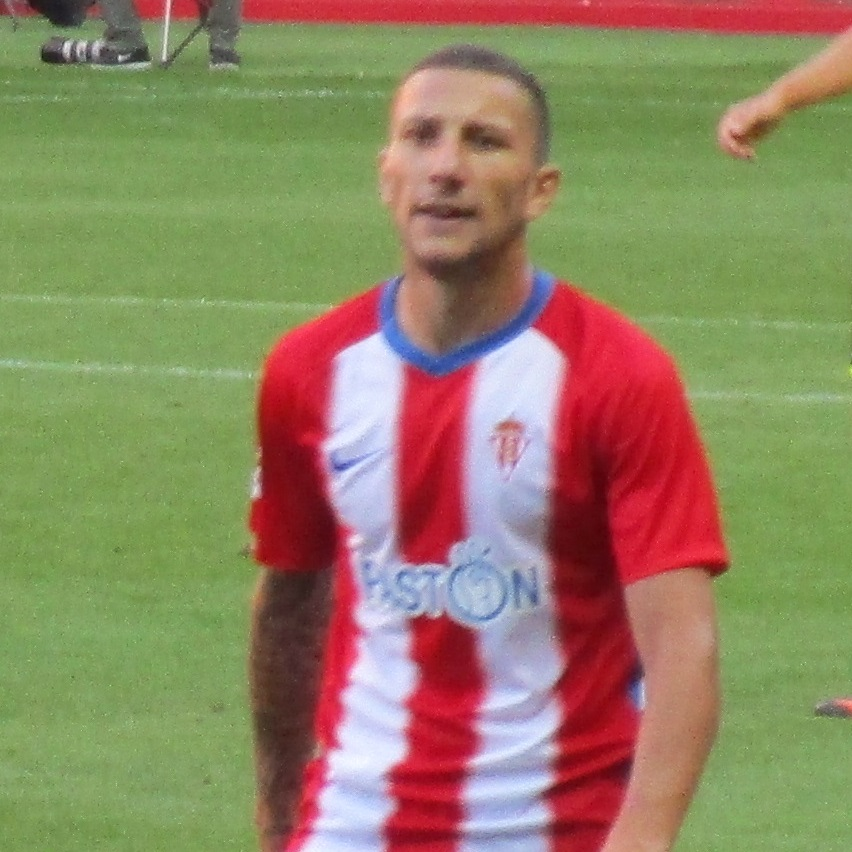
- Sousa playing for Sporting Gijón

Personal information
- Full name: André Alexandre Carreira Sousa
- Date of birth: 9 July 1990 (age 36)
- Place of birth: Moita, Portugal
- Height: 1.81 m (5 ft 11 in)
- Position: Midfielder

Team information
- Current team: União Santarém

Youth career
- 1999–2003: União Moitense
- 2003–2007: Sporting CP
- 2007–2009: Naval

Senior career*
Years	Team	Apps	(Gls)
2009–2010	Odivelas	15	(1)
2010–2011	Pampilhosa	30	(12)
2011−2015	Beira-Mar	53	(3)
2011–2012	→ Covilhã (loan)	17	(1)
2015	Académico Viseu	21	(0)
2015–2018	Belenenses	88	(5)
2018–2020	B-SAD	13	(1)
2018–2019	→ Sporting Gijón (loan)	22	(2)
2020–2021	Gaziantep	37	(2)
2021–2022	Manisa	22	(2)
2022–2023	Vilafranquense	18	(0)
2023–2026	Nacional	53	(3)
2026–	União Santarém	1	(0)

International career
2011	Portugal U21	2	(0)
- * Club domestic league appearances and goals as of 16:29, 9 August 2026 (UTC)

André Alexandre Carreira Sousa (born 9 July 1990) is a Portuguese professional footballer who plays as a midfielder for Liga 3 club União de Santarém.

== Club career ==
Born in Moita, Setúbal District, Sousa played youth football for three clubs, including Sporting CP from ages 13 to 17. He made his senior debut in the third division, first with Odivelas F.C. then F.C. Pampilhosa.

Sousa moved to the Primeira Liga on 26 July 2011, after signing a three-year contract with S.C. Beira-Mar. He was immediately loaned to S.C. Covilhã from the Segunda Liga, making his competitive debut on by starting and being sent off at the hour mark of a 4−0 home win against Caldas S.C. in the second round of the Taça de Portugal.

Returned to the Estádio Mário Duarte for 2012−13, Sousa's first match in the Portuguese top flight took place on 22 September 2012, coming on as a second-half substitute in a 4−0 away loss to FC Porto. It was only one of four league appearances during the season, which ended in relegation.

During the 2015 January transfer window, and with Beira-Mar immerse in a severe financial crisis − soon being relegated to the Aveiro regional championships− Sousa left as a free agent and joined division two team Académico de Viseu FC. He returned to the top tier in the ensuing off-season, signing with C.F. Os Belenenses.

In his debut campaign with his new club, Sousa made 40 appearances in all competitions and scored two goals. His first in the domestic league occurred on 27 September 2015, in a 2−2 draw at F.C. Arouca.

Sousa agreed to a season-long loan at Sporting de Gijón from Spain on 4 July 2018.

== International career ==
Sousa won two caps for the Portugal under-21 team, both in 2011. His first arrived on 31 May, when he played 14 minutes in a 4−2 friendly win over Germany in Portimão.
