= Javi Noblejas =

Spanish footballer

Personal information
- Full name: Francisco Javier García-Noblejas Hernanz
- Date of birth: 18 March 1993 (age 33)
- Place of birth: Madrid, Spain
- Height: 1.87 m (6 ft 1 1/2 in)
- Position: Left back

Youth career
- Las Rozas
- 2002–2011: Real Madrid

Senior career*
Years	Team	Apps	(Gls)
2011–2013	Real Madrid C	56	(4)
2011–2015	Real Madrid B	52	(1)
2015	Getafe B	4	(0)
2015	Getafe	1	(0)
2016	Elche	19	(2)
2017	Albacete	11	(0)
2017–2018	Rayo Vallecano	0	(0)
2017–2018	→ Córdoba (loan)	1	(0)
2018–2019	Sporting Gijón	0	(0)
2019–2021	NAC Breda	21	(0)

International career
2012	Spain U19	2	(0)
- * Club domestic league appearances and goals as of 6 December 2020

Francisco Javier "Javi" García-Noblejas Hernanz (born 18 March 1993) is a Spanish footballer who plays as a left back.

== Career ==
On 20 August 2018, after terminating his contract with Rayo Vallecano, Noblejas signed for Sporting de Gijón.
