= André Geraldes =

Portuguese footballer (born 1991)

Personal information
- Full name: André Geraldes de Barros
- Date of birth: 2 May 1991 (age 35)
- Place of birth: Maia, Portugal
- Height: 1.80 m (5 ft 11 in)
- Position: Full-back

Team information
- Current team: Casa Pia
- Number: 18

Youth career
- 2002–2004: Maia
- 2004–2005: Porto
- 2005–2009: Maia

Senior career*
Years	Team	Apps	(Gls)
2009–2010	Maia		
2010–2012	Rio Ave	0	(0)
2010–2011	→ Chaves (loan)	24	(1)
2011–2012	→ Aves (loan)	27	(0)
2012–2014	İstanbul Başakşehir	31	(0)
2014	→ Belenenses (loan)	12	(0)
2014–2020	Sporting CP	0	(0)
2014–2017	Sporting CP B	28	(0)
2015–2016	→ Belenenses (loan)	28	(0)
2016–2017	→ Vitória Setúbal (loan)	14	(0)
2017–2018	→ Belenenses (loan)	23	(0)
2018–2019	→ Sporting Gijón (loan)	33	(0)
2019–2020	→ Maccabi Tel Aviv (loan)	33	(0)
2020–2021	APOEL	9	(0)
2021–2023	Maccabi Tel Aviv	74	(1)
2023–	Casa Pia	80	(0)
- * Club domestic league appearances and goals as of 17:29, 24 October 2026 (UTC)

André Geraldes de Barros (born 2 May 1991) is a Portuguese professional footballer who plays as a right or left-back for Primeira Liga club Casa Pia, where he is captain.

== Club career ==
Born in Maia, Porto District, Geraldes spent most of his youth career with hometown club F.C. Maia, apart from one year with FC Porto in his early teenage years. He made his senior debut with the former in the fourth division in 2009.

A year later, Geraldes signed for Rio Ave F.C. but never played in their first team, instead being loaned out to G.D. Chaves (third tier) and C.D. Aves (second). In 2012, he joined İstanbul Başakşehir F.K. of the Turkish Süper Lig under compatriot Carlos Carvalhal.

After a loan to C.F. Os Belenenses in the first half of the year, Geraldes moved to another Lisbon-based club, Sporting CP, on a five-year deal in June 2014. Mainly associated to the reserves, he was loaned back to Belenenses in July 2015, and Vitória F.C. a year later, both in the top flight and the latter alongside fellow Lion Ryan Gauld.

Both Geraldes and the Scotsman returned to Sporting at the start of 2017. In August that year, the former made a now familiar move, joining Belenenses on loan for the third time.

In July 2018, Geraldes went back abroad on a one-year loan to Sporting de Gijón in Spain's Segunda División. The Asturians could not pay the fixed fee of €1 million to make the deal permanent, so he went on yet another temporary switch to Maccabi Tel Aviv F.C. of the Israeli Premier League. He won the league title during his season in the Middle East.

Geraldes left Sporting permanently on 8 September 2020, on a two-year deal at APOEL FC in the Cypriot First Division. However, the following 12 January he returned to Maccabi on a contract running until June 2022. On 20 February 2023, 12 years after scoring his first goal as a professional, he achieved the feat in a 1–0 home win against Hapoel Be'er Sheva FC.

On 27 June 2023, Geraldes went back to the Portuguese top division, with the 32-year-old signing with Casa Pia A.C. for three seasons.

== Honours ==
Maccabi Tel Aviv

- Israeli Premier League: 2019–20
