= Pablo Fernández (footballer) =

Spanish footballer

Personal information
- Full name: Pablo Fernández Blanco
- Date of birth: 17 September 1996 (age 30)
- Place of birth: Candás, Spain
- Height: 1.91 m (6 ft 3 in)
- Positions: Forward; winger

Team information
- Current team: União Leiria
- Number: 19

Youth career
- Sporting Gijón
- Candás
- 2014–2015: Sporting Gijón

Senior career*
Years	Team	Apps	(Gls)
2012–2014	Candás	36	(2)
2014–2019	Sporting Gijón B	173	(41)
2017–2019	Sporting Gijón	3	(0)
2019–2021	Cornellà	52	(9)
2021–2025	Gimnàstic	137	(28)
2025–	União Leiria	34	(6)
- * Club domestic league appearances and goals as of 19 June 2026

Pablo Fernández Blanco (born 17 September 1996) is a Spanish professional footballer who plays as a forward or winger for Liga Portugal 2 club União de Leiria.

== Club career ==
Born in Candás, Carreño, Asturias, Fernández represented Sporting de Gijón and Candás CF as a youth. He made his senior debut with the latter on 6 December 2012 at the age of just 16, coming on as a substitute in a 1–4 Tercera División home loss against CD Praviano.

Definitely promoted to the first team ahead of the 2013–14 campaign, Fernández scored his first senior goal on 30 October 2013 by netting the first in a 2–0 away win against Atlético de Lugones SD. The following July, he returned to Sporting, being assigned to the Juvenil A squad.

Fernández started to appear with the reserves during the season, with the side in Segunda División B. He made his first team – and La Liga – debut on 5 April 2017, replacing fellow youth graduate Nacho Cases in a 0–1 home loss against Málaga CF.

On 3 July 2019, Fernández left Sporting and signed for third division team UE Cornellà. On 28 June 2021, after two seasons as a regular starter, he agreed to a two-year deal with Gimnàstic de Tarragona in Primera División RFEF.

On 12 July 2025, Fernández moved abroad for the first time in his career, after signing a two-year contract with Liga Portugal 2 side U.D. Leiria.
