= Neftali Manzambi =

Swiss footballer (born 1997)

Personal information
- Full name: Neftali Benedic Manzambi
- Date of birth: 23 April 1997 (age 29)
- Place of birth: Luanda, Angola
- Height: 1.79 m (5 ft 10 1/2 in)
- Position: Forward

Youth career
- 2004–2008: La Chaux-de-Fonds
- 2008–2009: Xamax
- 2009–2010: La Chaux-de-Fonds
- 2010–2017: Basel

Senior career*
Years	Team	Apps	(Gls)
2017–2019	Basel	7	(1)
2018–2019	→ Sporting Gijón (loan)	12	(0)
2018–2019	→ Sporting B (loan)	7	(1)
2019–2021	Sporting Gijón	3	(0)
2019	→ Córdoba (loan)	4	(0)
2020	→ Valencia B (loan)	5	(0)
2021	→ Mjällby (loan)	4	(0)
2021–2024	Winterthur	49	(8)
2023	→ Schaffhausen (loan)	5	(1)
2024	Schaffhausen	13	(2)

International career
2012	Switzerland U15	2	(0)
2012–2013	Switzerland U16	4	(2)
2014–2015	Switzerland U18	3	(0)
2015–2016	Switzerland U19	11	(2)
2016–2017	Switzerland U20	9	(1)
- * Club domestic league appearances and goals as of 28 May 2024

Neftali Manzambi (born 23 April 1997) is a professional footballer who plays as a forward, most recently for Swiss club Schaffhausen. Born in Angola, he has represented Switzerland at youth level.

== Club career ==
=== Basel ===
The family Manzambi fled from Angola to Switzerland after Neftali's Birth. After playing his early football at FC La Chaux-de-Fonds and Xamax, Manzambi graduated with through FC Basel's youth system and advance to their U-21 team in 2014. He played regularly with the team and on 29 January 2016 he signed his first professional contract with the club, but stayed with the team.

Having already played eight test games with the first team, Manzambi was called up by Basel's head coach Urs Fischer for the game against FC Thun on 14 May 2017 and he played his Swiss Super League debut this 3–3 draw being substituted in during the 75th minute. On 8 June 2017 FC Basel 1893 extended Neftali Manzambi's contract, which would have expired at the end of the month, by a further three years, until the end of June 30, 2020.

Having scored seven goals for the U-21 team in nine games, Manzambi joined Basel's first team on a permanent basis during the winter break of their 2017–18 season under head coach Raphaël Wicky.

Manzambi played his first game over 90 minutes in the home game in the St. Jakob-Park on 29 April 2018. He scored his first goal for the team in the same game, it was the team's third goal as Basel won 6–1 against Thun. Manzambi was named as man of the match.

On 7 August 2018 Manzambi left the club. During his time with Basel's first team, Manzambi played a total of 23 games for them scoring a total of 4 goals. Nine of these games were in the Swiss Super League and 14 were friendly games. He scored one goal in the domestic league, the other three were scored during the test games.

=== Sporting Gijón ===
During July 2018, Manzambi joined Spanish Segunda División side Sporting de Gijón on a trial basis. On 7 August, he agreed to a one-year loan deal, with a buyout clause. Basel confirmed the deal on the same day.

On 30 January 2019, Sporting activated his buyout clause, with Manzambi signing a three-year contract and being immediately loaned to fellow second division side Córdoba CF until the end of the season. He subsequently failed to establish himself at Sporting, and served loan stints at Valencia CF Mestalla and Mjällby AIF.

=== Winterthur ===
On 6 July 2021, he returned to Switzerland and signed with Winterthur. On 7 September 2023, Manzambi joined Schaffhausen on loan with an option to buy.

=== Schaffhausen ===
On 15 February 2024, Manzambi returned to Schaffhausen. He departed the club again on 17 June 2024. He scored three goals in 18 matches in the 2023–24 Swiss Challenge League for Schaffhausen.

== Honours ==
Basel

- Swiss Super League: 2016–17
