= Carlos Cordero (footballer) =

Spanish footballer (born 1996)

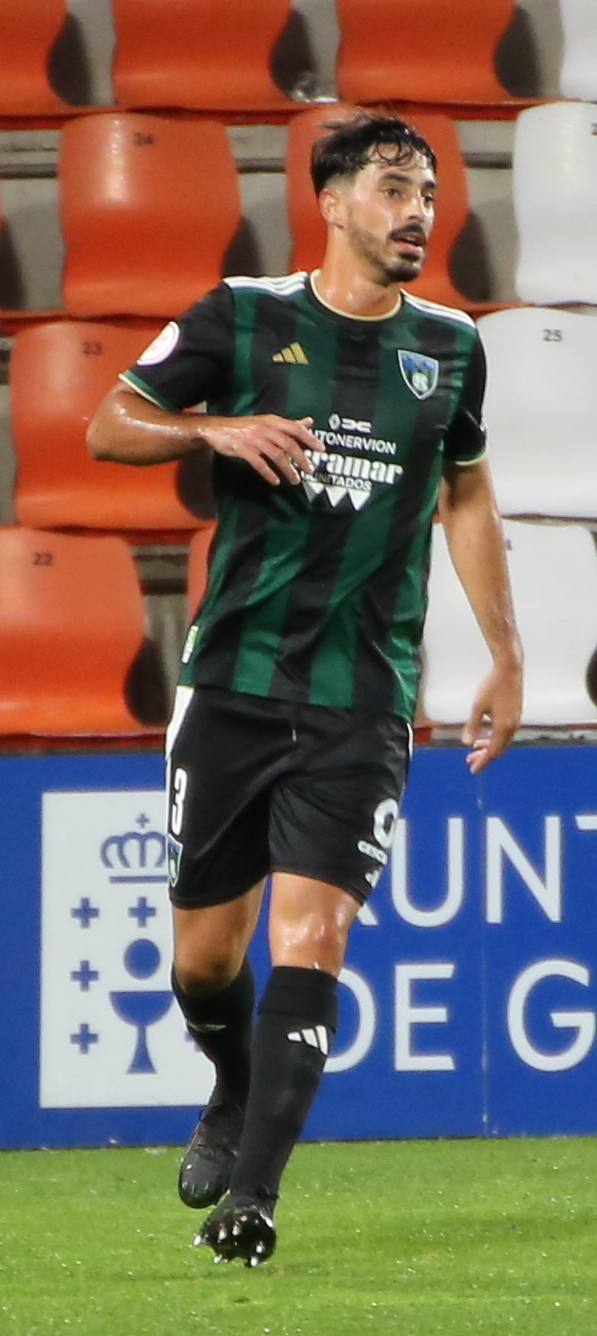
- Cordero with Sestao River in 2024

Personal information
- Full name: Carlos Cordero Pérez
- Date of birth: 26 September 1996 (age 30)
- Place of birth: Almendralejo, Spain
- Height: 1.81 m (5 ft 11 in)
- Position: Left back

Team information
- Current team: Extremadura
- Number: 3

Youth career
- Academia Extremadura

Senior career*
Years	Team	Apps	(Gls)
2015–2016	Fuente Cantos	33	(2)
2016–2019	Sporting B	83	(6)
2018–2020	Sporting Gijón	26	(0)
2020–2021	Marbella	4	(0)
2021–2022	Zamora	32	(0)
2022–2024	Badajoz	61	(0)
2024–2025	Sestao River	17	(1)
2025–	Extremadura	39	(3)
- * Club domestic league appearances and goals as of 15 May 2026

Carlos Cordero Pérez (born 26 September 1996) is a Spanish footballer who plays for Segunda Federación club Extremadura as a left back.

== Club career ==
Born in Almendralejo, Badajoz, Extremadura, Cordero made his senior debut with UD Fuente de Cantos during the 2015–16 season, in Tercera División. On 30 June 2016, he signed a three-year deal with Sporting de Gijón and was assigned to the B-team also in the fourth division.

Cordero made his first team debut on 23 November 2018, starting in a 2–1 Segunda División away win against Granada CF. Ahead of the 2019–20 campaign, he was definitely promoted to the main squad.

On 14 September 2020, Cordero agreed to a two-year contract with Segunda División B side Marbella FC, after terminating his contract with Sporting.

On 5 July 2024, Cordero signed with Primera Federación club Sestao River.

== Career statistics ==
As of match played 9 October 2022

Club	Season	League			Cup		Other		Total	
Club	Season	Division	Apps	Goals	Apps	Goals	Apps	Goals	Apps	Goals
Fuente Cantos	2015–16	Tercera División	33	2	0	0	0	0	33	2
Sporting Gijón B	2016–17	Tercera División	27	1	—		2 (Note: Appearance(s) in 2017 Tercera División play-offs)	0	29	1
Sporting Gijón B	2017–18	Segunda División B	36	3	—		4 (Note: Appearance(s) in 2018 Segunda División B play-offs)	0	40	3
Sporting Gijón B	2018–19	Segunda División B	20	2	—		0	0	20	2
Sporting Gijón B	Total		83	6	0	0	6	0	89	6
Sporting Gijón	2018–19	Segunda División	12	0	1	0	0	0	13	0
Sporting Gijón	2019–20	Segunda División	14	0	0	0	0	0	14	0
Sporting Gijón	Total		26	0	1	0	0	0	27	0
Marbella	2020–21	Segunda División B	4	0	0	0	0	0	4	0
Zamora	2021–22	Primera División RFEF	32	0	1	1	0	0	33	1
Badajoz	2022–23	Primera División RFEF	7	0	0	0	0	0	7	0
Career Total			185	8	2	1	6	0	193	9
