= Álvaro Traver =

Spanish footballer

Personal information
- Full name: Álvaro Traver Navarrete
- Date of birth: 1 April 1993 (age 33)
- Place of birth: Algemesí, Spain
- Height: 1.87 m (6 ft 1 1/2 in)
- Position: Winger

Team information
- Current team: Alzira

Youth career
- Levante

Senior career*
Years	Team	Apps	(Gls)
2010–2017	Levante B	114	(20)
2012–2013	→ Catarroja (loan)	18	(4)
2013	→ Reus (loan)	16	(2)
2015–2017	Levante	0	(0)
2017	→ Logroñés (loan)	11	(2)
2017–2018	Sporting B	34	(7)
2018–2020	Sporting Gijón	38	(1)
2020–2021	Numancia	7	(0)
2021	Racing Santander	11	(0)
2021–2022	Alzira	9	(1)
2022–2023	Coria	43	(3)
2023–2025	Soneja	50	(10)
2025–	Alzira	10	(1)
- * Club domestic league appearances and goals as of 9 November 2025

Álvaro Traver Navarrete (born 1 April 1993) is a Spanish footballer who plays as a winger for Tercera Federación club Alzira.

== Club career ==
Born in Algemesí, Valencia, Valencian Community, Traver finished his formation with Levante UD. He made his senior debut with the reserve team on 20 February 2010, in a Tercera División match against UD Puçol.

On 30 August 2012 Traver was loaned to fellow league team Catarroja CF, in a season-long deal. After being an ever-present figure for the side, he moved to Segunda División B side CF Reus Deportiu on 31 January 2013, on loan until June.

Traver returned to the Granotas in June 2013, and signed a new two-year deal on 30 January of the following year. On 3 December 2015, after further extending his contract until 2018 in July, he made his first team debut by starting in a 1–1 Copa del Rey home draw against RCD Espanyol.

On 4 July 2016, Traver was listed among the main squad, freshly relegated to Segunda División. However, he returned to the B-side after the pre-season ended, and was loaned to third-tier club UD Logroñés on 31 January 2017.

On 25 August 2017, Traver moved to another reserve team, Sporting de Gijón B also in the third division. He was definitely promoted to the main squad ahead of the 2018–19 season, after agreeing to a new three-year contract.

Traver scored his first professional goal on 23 November 2018, netting the winner in a 2–1 away win against Granada CF. He left the club after his contract expired in July 2020, and signed for recently relegated side CD Numancia on 2 October.
