= Pablo Pérez (footballer, born 1993) =

Spanish footballer

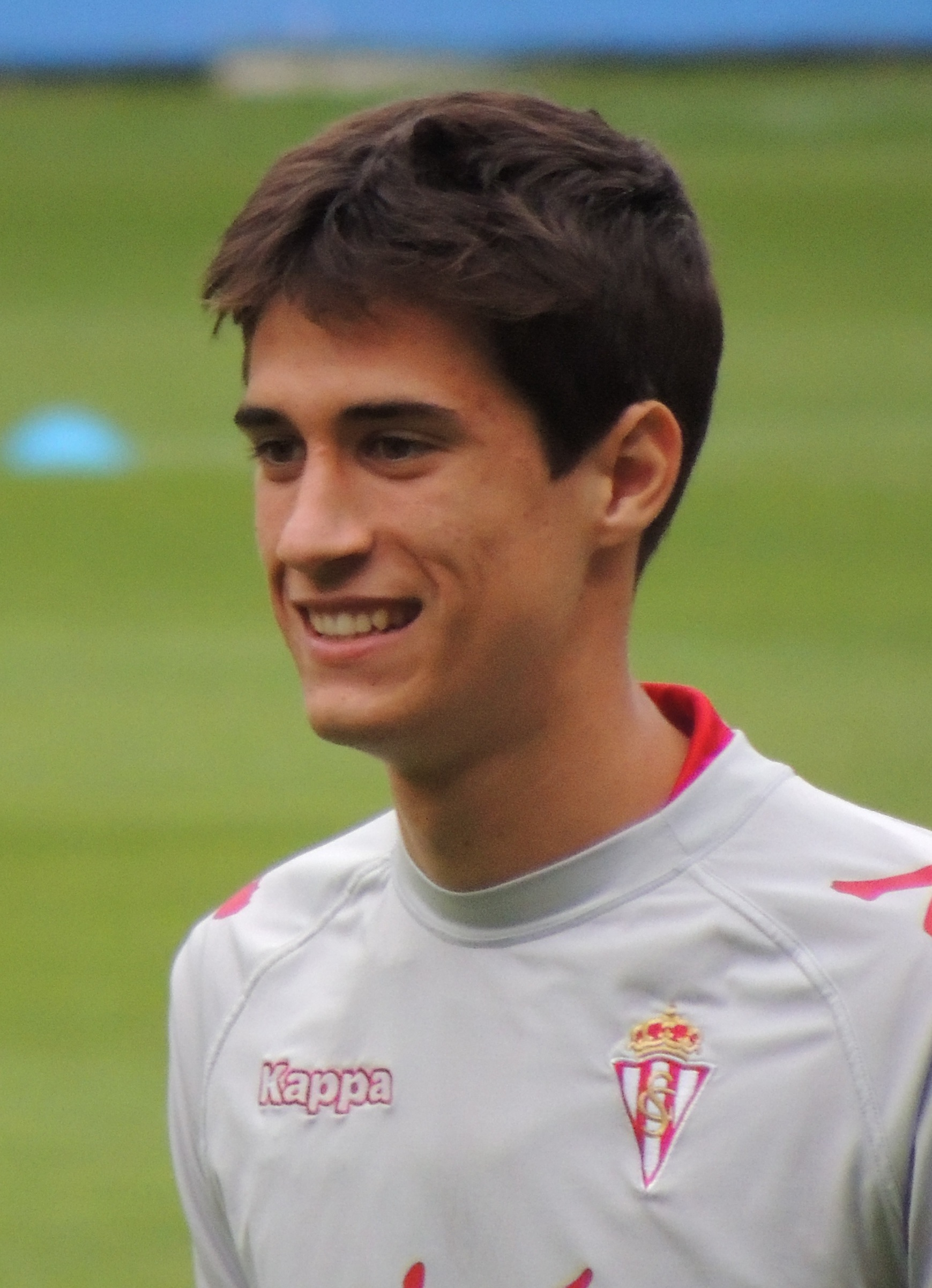
- Pérez with Sporting Gijón in 2014

Personal information
- Full name: Pablo Pérez Rodríguez
- Date of birth: 2 August 1993 (age 33)
- Place of birth: Gijón, Spain
- Height: 1.87 m (6 ft 2 in)
- Position: Attacking midfielder

Team information
- Current team: Langreo
- Number: 22

Youth career
- 2000–2011: Inmaculada
- 2011–2012: Sporting Gijón

Senior career*
Years	Team	Apps	(Gls)
2012–2014	Sporting Gijón B	59	(12)
2014–2022	Sporting Gijón	175	(11)
2016–2017	→ Alcorcón (loan)	33	(2)
2022–2023	Bengaluru	14	(2)
2023–2024	Rayo Majadahonda	21	(1)
2024–	Langreo	41	(6)
- * Club domestic league appearances and goals as of 14 May 2026

Pablo Pérez Rodríguez (born 2 August 1993) is a Spanish professional footballer who plays as an attacking midfielder for Langreo.

== Club career ==
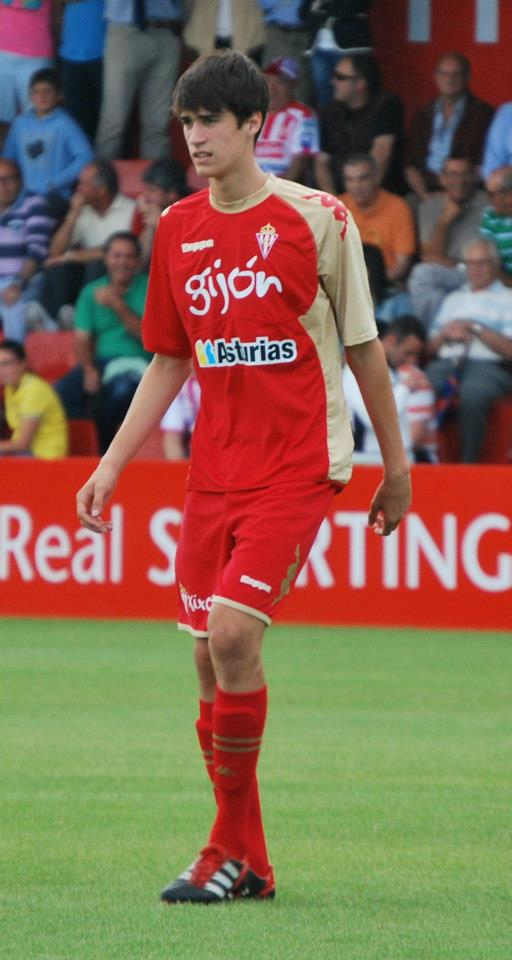
Pérez in action for Sporting B in 2013

Born in Gijón, Asturias, Pérez joined Sporting de Gijón's youth setup in 2011, aged 17, after starting it out at Colegio de la Inmaculada. He made his senior debuts with the reserves in the 2011–12 campaign in the Segunda División B.

Pérez played his first match as a professional on 24 May 2014, starting in a 1–0 home success against FC Barcelona B in the Segunda División. He was definitely promoted to the main squad in August.

On 6 September Pérez scored his first goal, netting his side's only in a 1–1 away draw against Albacete Balompié, through a last-minute header. He scored a brace on the 20th, netting all goals in a 2–0 away win against CD Mirandés.

On 11 November 2014 Pérez renewed his link with Sporting, until 2019. He contributed with 37 appearances and seven goals during the season, as his side returned to La Liga after three years.

Pérez made his debut in the main category of Spanish football on 12 September 2015, starting and being booked in a 0–1 home loss against Valencia CF. The following 31 August, he was loaned to AD Alcorcón in the second tier, for one year.

On 5 December 2022, Pérez signed for Indian Super League club Bengaluru on a deal until the end of the 2022–23 season.
