= Álvaro Jiménez (Spanish footballer) =

Spanish footballer

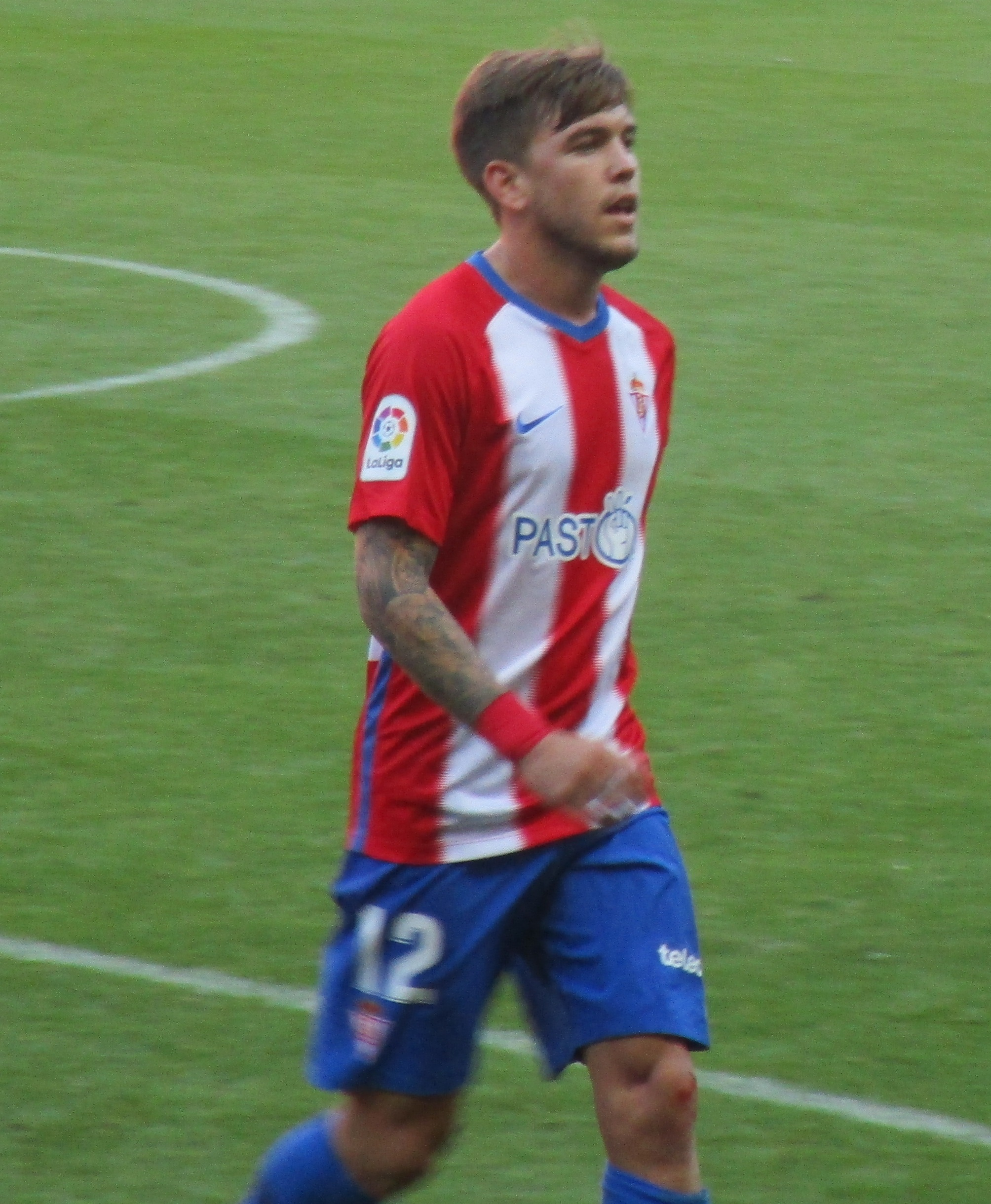
- Jiménez playing for Sporting Gijón in 2018

Personal information
- Full name: Álvaro José Jiménez Guerrero
- Date of birth: 19 May 1995 (age 31)
- Place of birth: Córdoba, Spain
- Height: 1.75 m (5 ft 9 in)
- Position: Winger

Team information
- Current team: Tarazona
- Number: 17

Youth career
- 2003–2010: Córdoba
- 2010–2014: Real Madrid

Senior career*
Years	Team	Apps	(Gls)
2013–2015	Real Madrid C	9	(1)
2014–2017	Real Madrid B	60	(8)
2016–2017	→ Getafe (loan)	33	(2)
2017–2020	Getafe	13	(1)
2018–2019	→ Sporting Gijón (loan)	20	(1)
2019–2020	→ Albacete (loan)	26	(2)
2020–2021	Albacete	35	(5)
2021–2024	Cádiz	9	(0)
2022	→ Ibiza (loan)	8	(1)
2022–2023	→ Las Palmas (loan)	26	(3)
2023	→ Tractor (loan)	12	(0)
2024	→ Tenerife (loan)	8	(0)
2024–2025	Iraklis	6	(0)
2025–	Tarazona	22	(2)
- * Club domestic league appearances and goals as of 10 June 2026

Álvaro José Jiménez Guerrero (born 19 May 1995) is a Spanish professional footballer who plays as a right winger for Primera Federación club Tarazona.

== Club career ==
Jiménez was born in Córdoba, Andalusia, and joined Real Madrid's youth setup in 2010, after starting it out at Córdoba CF. He made his senior debut with the former's C-team on 8 September 2013, coming on as a second-half substitute in a 2–0 home loss against Getafe CF B in the Segunda División B.

Jiménez was definitely promoted to the C's in July 2014, but spent the vast majority of the campaign with the reserves in the third tier. He made his debut for Castilla on 5 October 2014, starting in a 1–0 away win against Barakaldo CF.

Jiménez scored his first goal for the side on 11 November, netting the first in Castilla's 2–1 home win against UB Conquense; he also scored doubles in a 4–1 routing of CD Toledo and in a 4–2 win against Atlético Madrid B, both in January 2015. He finished the season as one of the club's top goalscorer with seven goals, along with Burgui and Raúl De Tomás.

On 4 August 2016, Jiménez was loaned to Segunda División side Getafe CF, in a season-long deal. He made his professional debut on 26 August, coming on as a late substitute for Facundo Castillón in a 0–0 home draw against CD Numancia.

On 26 June 2017, after Getafe's promotion, Jiménez was bought outright by the club. He made his La Liga debut on 20 August, starting and being sent off in a 0–0 away draw against Athletic Bilbao.

On 22 August 2018, Jiménez was loaned to second-tier side Sporting de Gijón for a year. The following 12 July, he joined fellow league team Albacete Balompié also in a temporary deal.

On 1 September 2020, Jiménez signed a permanent two-year contract with Albacete. On 8 August of the following year, after the club's relegation, he moved to Cádiz CF in the top tier on a four-year deal.

On 29 January 2022, Jiménez returned to the second tier after agreeing to a loan deal with UD Ibiza for the remainder of the campaign. On 20 July, he moved to fellow second division side UD Las Palmas, also in a temporary deal.

On 5 July 2023, Jiménez moved abroad for the first time in his career and joined Iranian side Tractor SC on a one-year loan. The following 3 January, he returned to the Canary Islands after agreeing to a loan deal with CD Tenerife for the remainder of the season.

On 14 September 2024 the Greek club Iraklis signed a one-year contract with Jiménez.
