= 2023–24 Sporting de Gijón season =

Sporting de Gijón
2023–24 season
- President: Alejandro Irarragorri
- Head coach: Miguel Ángel Ramírez
- Stadium: El Molinón
- Segunda División: 5th
- Copa del Rey: Second round
- Top goalscorer: League: Gaspar Campos; Juan Ferney Otero (10 each); All: Gaspar Campos; Juan Ferney Otero (10 each)
- Average home league attendance: 19,508
Home colours	Away colours	Third colours

The 2023–24 season is Real Sporting de Gijón's 119th season in existence and seventh consecutive in the Segunda División, the second division of association football in Spain. They also competed in the Copa del Rey.

== Players ==
=== First-team squad ===
As of 18 January 2024.

Note: Flags indicate national team as defined under FIFA eligibility rules; some limited exceptions apply. Players may hold more than one non-FIFA nationality.

No.	Pos.	Nation	Player
1	GK	ESP	Rubén Yáñez
2	DF	ESP	Guille Rosas
3	DF	ESP	Cote
4	DF	ESP	Pablo Insua
5	DF	ESP	Pablo García
6	MF	ESP	Nacho Martín
7	MF	ESP	Gaspar Campos
8	MF	ESP	Fran Villalba
9	MF	ESP	Dani Queipo
10	MF	ESP	Nacho Méndez
11	FW	ESP	Víctor Campuzano
12	MF	FRA	Jonathan Varane
13	GK	CUB	Christian Joel

No.	Pos.	Nation	Player
14	DF	CIV	Axel Bamba
15	MF	ESP	Roque Mesa
16	DF	ESP	Diego Sánchez
17	MF	ESP	Christian Rivera
18	MF	URU	Giovanni Zarfino
19	FW	COL	Juan Otero
20	FW	ESP	Mario González (on loan from Los Angeles FC)
21	FW	FRA	Haissem Hassan (on loan from Villarreal)
22	DF	ESP	Róber Pier
23	FW	MNE	Uroš Đurđević
24	DF	ARG	Carlos Izquierdoz
25	DF	ROU	Alexandru Pașcanu (on loan from Ponferradina)

=== Reserve team ===
Note: Flags indicate national team as defined under FIFA eligibility rules; some limited exceptions apply. Players may hold more than one non-FIFA nationality.

No.	Pos.	Nation	Player
26	GK	FRA	Florentin Bloch
27	FW	ESP	Álex Oyón
29	DF	FRA	Yann Kembo
30	FW	ESP	Álex Lozano
31	FW	MEX	Esteban Lozano (on loan from América)
33	MF	ARG	Tomás Fuentes

No.	Pos.	Nation	Player
34	DF	ESP	Borja Montes
35	FW	ESP	Marcos Fernández
36	GK	ESP	Pablo Díez
37	FW	ESP	Cristian Acerete
38	MF	FRA	Pierre Mbemba

=== Out on loan ===
Note: Flags indicate national team as defined under FIFA eligibility rules; some limited exceptions apply. Players may hold more than one non-FIFA nationality.

No.	Pos.	Nation	Player
—	DF	ESP	Enol Coto (at Murcia until 30 June 2024)
—	FW	SRB	Uroš Milovanović (at TSC until 30 June 2024)

== Transfers ==
=== In ===
Pos.	Player	Transferred from	Fee	Date	Source

=== Out ===
Pos.	Player	Transferred to	Fee	Date	Source

== Pre-season and friendlies ==
Win Draw Loss Fixtures

29 July 2023 Friendly	Sporting Gijón	1–1	Burgos	Gijón
18:00 CEST (UTC+2)	Varane 34'		Niño 17'	Stadium: Escuela de Fútbol de Mareo

4 August 2023 Friendly	Real Avilés	0–0	Sporting Gijón
20:00 CEST (UTC+2)

5 August 2023 Friendly	Cultural Leonesa	1–0	Sporting Gijón
20:00 CEST (UTC+2)	Dorian Jr. 81'

== Competitions ==
Competition	First match	Last match	Starting round	Final position	Record							
Competition	First match	Last match	Starting round	Final position	Pld	W	D	L	GF	GA	GD	Win %
Segunda División	11 August 2023	2 June 2024	Matchday 1	5th	42	18	11	13	51	42	+9	42.86
Copa del Rey	1 November 2023	6 December 2023	First round	Second round	2	1	0	1	3	2	+1	50.00
Total					44	19	11	14	54	44	+10	43.18

Source: Soccerway

=== Segunda División ===
==== League table ====
Pos	Team	Pld	W	D	L	GF	GA	GD	Pts	Qualification or relegation
3	Eibar	42	21	8	13	72	48	+24	71	Qualification for promotion play-offs
4	Espanyol (O, P)	42	17	18	7	59	40	+19	69	Qualification for promotion play-offs
5	Sporting Gijón	42	18	11	13	51	42	+9	65	Qualification for promotion play-offs
6	Oviedo	42	17	13	12	55	39	+16	64 (Note: Oviedo finished ahead of Racing Santander on overall goal difference)	Qualification for promotion play-offs
7	Racing Santander	42	18	10	14	63	55	+8	64	

Updated to match(es) played on 2 Jun 2024. Source: LaLiga HyperMotion
Rules for classification: 1) Points; 2) Head-to-head points; 3) Head-to-head goal difference; 4) Goal difference; 5) Goals scored; 6) Fair-play points
(Note: Head-to-head record is used only after all the matches between the teams in question have been played)
(O) Play-off winners; (P) Promoted

==== Results summary ====
Overall								Home						Away					
Pld	W	D	L	GF	GA	GD	Pts	W	D	L	GF	GA	GD	W	D	L	GF	GA	GD
42	18	11	13	51	42	+9	65	12	6	3	32	18	+14	6	5	10	19	24	−5

Source: LALIGA HYPERMOTION

==== Results by round ====
Round	1	2	3	4	5	6	7	8	9	10	11	12	13	14	15	16	17	18	19	20	21	22	23	24
Ground	A	H	A	H	A	H	A	A	H	A	H	A	H	A	H	A	H	A	H	H	A	H	A	H
Result	L	W	L	W	D	W	D	W	W	L	D	W	W	W	D	D	W	L	D	D	D			
Position	19	9	13	7	10	6	8	6	5	8	9	8	3	3	2	2	2	2	3	3	3			

Source: LALIGA HYPERMOTION
A = Away; H = Home; W = Win; D = Draw; L = Loss

==== Matches ====
The league fixtures were unveiled on 28 June 2023.

11 August 2023 1	Valladolid	2–0	Sporting Gijón	Valladolid
21:30 CEST (UTC+2)	Cédric 20'; Monchu 53'	Report		Stadium: Estadio José Zorrilla; Attendance: 16,912; Referee: Jon Ander González Esteban

20 August 2023 2	Sporting Gijón	3–0	Mirandés	Gijón
19:30 CEST (UTC+2)	Otero 27'; Đurđević 34'; Gaspar Campos 38'; Pașcanu (yellow card) 62'; Diego Sánchez (yellow card) 84'	Report	Barbu (yellow card) 26'; Alan Godoy (yellow card) 45+3'	Stadium: El Molinón; Attendance: 18,394; Referee: (Spain) Salvador Lax Franco

27 August 2023 3	Racing de Ferrol	2–0	Sporting Gijón	Ferrol
17:00 CEST (UTC+2)	Héber Pena 53'; Álex López 86'	Report	Đurđević (yellow card) 28'; Hassan (yellow card) 85'	Stadium: Estadio Municipal da Malata; Attendance: 9,010; Referee: (Spain) Alejandro Quintero González

2 September 2023 4	Sporting Gijón	2–1	Burgos	Gijón
16:15 CEST (UTC+2)	Otero 18'; Varane (yellow card) 77'; Daniel Queipo 90+8'	Report	Miki Muñoz (yellow card) 23'; Curro Sánchez 59'	Stadium: El Molinón; Attendance: 16,890; Referee: (Spain) Raúl González Francés

9 September 2023 5	Real Oviedo	0–0	Sporting Gijón	Oviedo
18:30 CEST (UTC+2)	Luismi (yellow card) 24'; Abel Bretones (yellow card) 46'	Report	Pașcanu (yellow card) 12'; Hassan (yellow card) 20'; Daniel Queipo (yellow card) 90'	Stadium: Estadio Carlos Tartiere; Attendance: 22,121; Referee: (Spain) Adrián Cordero Vega

17 September 2023 6	Sporting Gijón	2–1	Tenerife	Gijón
21:00 CEST (UTC+2)	Gaspar Campos 21'; Nacho Méndez (yellow card) 43'; Pablo Insua (yellow card) 44' (goal) 90+4'	Report	Roberto López 13' (yellow card) 49'; Dauda (yellow card) 22'; Mellot (yellow card) 41'; Elady (yellow card) 67'; Loïc Williams (yellow card) 69'	Stadium: El Molinón; Attendance: 15,792; Referee: (Spain) Luis Milla Alvendiz

23 September 2023 7	FC Andorra	0–0	Sporting Gijón	Andorra la Vella
14:00 CEST (UTC+2)		Report	Pablo Insua (yellow card) 48'	Stadium: Estadi Nacional; Attendance: 2,120; Referee: (Spain) Andrés Fuentes Molina

1 October 2023 8	Huesca	0–1	Sporting Gijón	Huesca
21:00 CEST (UTC+2)	Javi Mier (yellow card) 1'; Iván Martos (yellow card) 61'; Óscar Sielva (yellow card) 68'; Jorge Pulido (yellow card) 90+2'; Juanjo Nieto (yellow card) 90+2'; Bolívar (yellow card) 90+6'	Report	Roque Mesa (yellow card) 41'; Méndez 49' (yellow card) 90+2'; Đurđević (yellow card) 84'; Izquierdoz (yellow card) 87'; Rubén Yáñez (yellow card) 90+2'; Christian Rivera (yellow card) 90+6'	Stadium: El Alcoraz; Attendance: 4,884; Referee: (Spain) Manuel Jesús Orellana Cid

4 October 2023 9	Sporting Gijón	2–0	Elche	Gijón
21:30 CEST (UTC+2)	Gaspar Campos 31'; Pașcanu 41'	Report		Stadium: El Molinón; Attendance: 14,916; Referee: (Spain) Daniel Jesús Trujillo Suárez

7 October 2023 10	Racing Santander	3–2	Sporting Gijón	Santander
18:30 CEST (UTC+2)	Andrés Martín 28' (yellow card) 90+5'; Iñigo Vicente (yellow card) 39'; Grenier (yellow card) 41'; Gerard Fernández 48'; Marco Sangalli (yellow card) 75'; Ekain Zenitagoia 83'	Report	Gaspar Campos 32' 63'; Roque Mesa (yellow card) 37'; Fran Villalba (yellow card) 86'; Christian Rivera (yellow card) 90'; Nacho Méndez (yellow card) 90+5'	Stadium: Campos de Sport de El Sardinero; Attendance: 19,356; Referee: (Spain) Iosu Galech Apezteguía

14 October 2023 11	Sporting Gijón	2–2	Real Zaragoza	Gijón
18:30 CEST (UTC+2)	Đurđević (yellow card) 33'; Otero (yellow card) 50'; Guille Rosas (yellow card) 50'; Víctor Campuzano 86'; Pablo Insua 90+7'	Report	Lecoeuche (yellow card) 7'; Maikel Mesa 45' (yellow card) 90+3'; Iván Azón 76'	Stadium: El Molinón; Attendance: 20,698; Referee: (Spain) Rafael Sánchez López

22 October 2023 12	Albacete	1–3	Sporting Gijón	Albacete
18:30 CEST (UTC+2)	Juan Antonio Ros (yellow card) 15'; Agus Medina (yellow card) 21'; Alberto Quiles (yellow card) 73'; Silva 86'	Report	Víctor Campuzano 34'; Nacho Méndez (yellow card) 42'; Pablo Insua (yellow card) 48'; Gaspar Campos 49'; Pașcanu (yellow card) 83'; Hassan 83'	Stadium: Estadio Carlos Belmonte; Attendance: 11,007; Referee: (Spain) Raúl González Francés

28 October 2023 13	Sporting Gijón	2–0	Espanyol	Gijón
18:30 CEST (UTC+2)	Otero (yellow card) 33' (goal) 33'; Róber Pier (yellow card) 45+3'; Gaspar Campos (yellow card) 54'; Víctor Campuzano 69'; Cote (yellow card) 75'; Đurđević (yellow card) 83'; Pașcanu (yellow card) 85'	Report	Óscar Gil (yellow card) 34'; Javi Puado (yellow card) 58'; Fernando Calero (yellow card) 84'	Stadium: El Molinón; Attendance: 19,951; Referee: (Spain) Adrián Cordero Vega

4 November 2023 14	Villarreal B	0–3	Sporting Gijón	Villarreal
16:15 CEST (UTC+2)		Report	Otero 4'; Víctor Campuzano 57'; Cote 72'	Stadium: Estadio de la Cerámica; Attendance: 2,598; Referee: (Spain) Salvador Lax Franco

11 November 2023 15	Sporting Gijón	1–1	Amorebieta	Gijón
21:00 CET (UTC+1)	Gaspar Campos 61'; Christian Rivera (yellow card) 90+1'	Report	Sibo (yellow card) 17'; Daniel Lasure (yellow card) 22'; Manu Hernando (yellow card) 53'; Josep Gayá 67'; Álvaro Núñez (yellow card) 75'; Pablo Cuñat (yellow card) 90+5'	Stadium: El Molinón; Attendance: 18,972; Referee: (Spain) Iván Caparrós Hernández

18 November 2023 16	Alcorcón	0–0	Sporting Gijón	Alcorcón
16:15 CET (UTC+1)	Eteki (yellow card) 18'; Jacobo González (yellow card) 78'	Report	Christian Rivera (yellow card) 63'; Gaspar Campos (yellow card) 81'	Stadium: Estadio Municipal de Santo Domingo; Attendance: 4,414; Referee: (Spain) Alejandro Quintero González

27 November 2023 17	Sporting Gijón	2–0	Eldense	Gijón
21:00 CET (UTC+1)	Gaspar Campos 8'; Varane (yellow card) 36'; Đurđević 69'	Report	Toni Abad (yellow card) 68'; David Timor (yellow card) 90+4'	Stadium: El Molinón; Attendance: 14,892; Referee: (Spain) Rubén Ávalos Barrera

2 December 2023 18	FC Cartagena	1–0	Sporting Gijón	Cartagena
16:15 CET (UTC+1)	Juan Carlos Real (yellow card) 65' (goal) 79'	Report	Pablo Insua (yellow card) 43'; Hassan (yellow card) 90+5'; Izquierdoz (yellow card) 90+6'	Stadium: Estadio Cartagonova; Attendance: 5,702; Referee: (Spain) José López Toca

9 December 2023 19	Sporting Gijón	0–0	Levante	Gijón
18:30 CET (UTC+1)	Đurđević (yellow card) 30' (yellow-red card) 56'; Gaspar Campos (yellow card) 37'; Christian Rivera (yellow card) 57'; Izquierdoz (yellow card) 57'; Varane (yellow card) 74'; Róber Pier (yellow card) 80'; Fran Villalba (yellow card) 90+7'	Report	Pablo Martínez (yellow card) 17'; Oriol Rey (yellow card) 36'; Sergio Lozano (yellow card) 49'; Álex Muñoz (yellow card) 78'	Stadium: El Molinón; Attendance: 19,640; Referee: (Spain) Germán Cid Camacho

16 December 2023 20	Sporting Gijón	1–1	Leganés	Gijón
18:30 CET (UTC+1)	Izquierdoz (yellow card) 45+2'; Otero 51' (pen.); Cote (yellow card) 57'; Alejandro Lozano (yellow card) 90+6'	Report	Sergio González 37'; Cissé (yellow card) 45+1'; Enric Franquesa (yellow card) 82'; Nyom (yellow card) 85'	Stadium: El Molinón; Attendance: 20,035; Referee: (Spain) Jon González Esteban

20 December 2023 21	Eibar	1–1	Sporting Gijón	Eibar
21:30 CET (UTC+1)	Jon Bautista (yellow card) 28'; Ager Aketxe 66' (pen.); Anaitz Arbilla (yellow card) 76'; Matheus Pereira (yellow card) 77'	Report	Víctor Campuzano 22'; Nacho Méndez (yellow card) 75'; Izquierdoz (yellow card) 87'; Róber Pier (yellow card) 90+6'	Stadium: Ipurua Municipal Stadium; Attendance: 4,054; Referee: (Spain) Rafael Sánchez López

14 January 2024 22	Sporting Gijón	0–0	Huesca	Gijón
16:15 CET (UTC+1)				Stadium: El Molinón

20 January 2024 23	Tenerife	1–2	Sporting Gijón	Santa Cruz de Tenerife
18:30 CET (UTC+1)				Stadium: Estadio Heliodoro Rodríguez López

28 January 2024 24	Sporting Gijón	1–2	Racing Ferrol	Gijón
21:00 CET (UTC+1)	Izquierdoz 52'		Giménez 71'; Merino 90+6'	Stadium: El Molinón

10 February 2024 26	Sporting Gijón	1–0	Oviedo	Gijón
18:30 CET (UTC+1)	Méndez 2'			Stadium: El Molinón; Attendance: 26,794; Referee: Jon Ander González Esteban

24 March 2024 32	Amorebieta	3–1	Sporting Gijón	Lezama
14:00 CET (UTC+1)	Jauregi 23'; Morcillo 45+1'; Garreta (yellow card) 48'; Edwards 90+1'		Otero 43'; Varane (yellow card) 61'	Stadium: Instalaciones de Lezama Campo 2 Referee: Daniel Jesús Trujillo Suárez

30 March 2024 33	Sporting Gijón	2–3	Racing Santander	Gijón
18:30 CET (UTC+1)				Stadium: El Molinón

13 April 2024 35	Sporting Gijón	1–0	FC Cartagena	Gijón
				Stadium: El Molinón

20 April 2024 36	Elche	2–1	Sporting Gijón	Elche

28 April 2024 37	Sporting Gijón	0–3	Villarreal B	Gijón
				Stadium: El Molinón

5 May 2024 38	Espanyol	0–0	Sporting Gijón	Cornellá/El Prat
				Stadium: Stage Front Stadium

11 May 2024 39	Sporting Gijón	5–2	Andorra	Gijón
				Stadium: El Molinón

18 May 2024 40	Leganés	2–1	Sporting Gijón	Leganés

26 May 2024 41	Sporting Gijón	1–0	Eibar	Gijón
				Stadium: El Molinón

2 June 2024 42	Eldense	0–1	Sporting Gijón	Elda

==== Promotion play-offs ====
9 June 2024 Semi-finals; First leg	Sporting Gijón	0–1	Espanyol	Gijón
21:00	Mesa (yellow card) 30'; Rosas (yellow card) 67'; Campuzano (yellow card) 74'		Gragera (yellow card) 50'; Oliván (yellow card) 67'; Calero (yellow card) 70'; Puado 88'; Gómez (red card) 90'; Cabrera (yellow card) 90+2'; El Hilali (yellow card) 90+7'	Stadium: El Molinón; Referee: Jon Ander González Esteban

13 June 2024 Semi-finals; Second leg	Espanyol	v (1–0 agg.)	Sporting Gijón	Cornellá/El Prat
21:00				Stadium: Stage Front Stadium; Referee: Álvaro Moreno Aragón

=== Copa del Rey ===
1 November 2023 First round	Guijuelo	0–3	Sporting Gijón	Guijuelo
17:30 CET	Cristóbal Gil (yellow card) 70'	Report	Asiel Mateo 59' (o.g.); Izquierdoz (yellow card) 60'; Hassan 67'; Marcos Fernández Segado 86'	Stadium: Estadio Municipal de Guijuelo; Referee: (Spain) José Antonio López Toca

6 December 2023 Second round	Unionistas de Salamanca	2–0	Sporting Gijón	Salamanca
16:00 CET	Alfred Planas 7'; Sergio Camus (yellow card) 48' (goal) 53'; Juan Serrano (yellow card) 84'	Report	Carrillo (yellow card) 15'; Lozano (yellow card) 90+1'; Pablo Insua (yellow card) 90+4'	Stadium: Reina Sofía; Attendance: 4,896; Referee: (Spain) Ion Rodríguez Portela
