= 2024–25 Sporting de Gijón season =

Sporting de Gijón
2024–25 season
- Manager: Rubén Albés (until 6 April); Asier Garitano (from 8 April)
- Stadium: El Molinón
- Segunda División: 12th
- Copa del Rey: Second round
- Top goalscorer: League: Juan Ferney Otero (8); All: Juan Ferney Otero (8)
- Average home league attendance: 21,131
Home colours	Away colours	Third colours

The 2024–25 season is the 120th season in Sporting Gijón's history and the ninth consecutive season in the Segunda División. In addition to the domestic league, the club is also competing in the Copa del Rey.

== Transfers ==
=== In ===
Pos.	Player	Transferred from	Fee	Date	Source
FW	(Ecuador) Jordy Caicedo	(Mexico) Atlas	Loan	15 July 2024	
MF	(Spain) Jonathan Dubasin	(Switzerland) Basel	Loan	26 July 2024	
MF	(Spain) César Gelabert	(France) Toulouse	Loan	21 August 2024	
DF	(Spain) Kevin Vázquez	(Spain) Celta Vigo	Free	28 August 2024	
DF	(Serbia) Nikola Maraš	(Spain) Deportivo Alavés	Loan	30 August 2024	
FW	(Spain) Alejandro Lozano	(Spain) Real Unión	Loan return	4 January 2025	

=== Out ===
Pos.	Player	Transferred from	Fee	Date	Source
FW	(Montenegro) Uroš Đurđević	(Mexico) Atlas	€2,000,000	16 July 2024	
FW	(Montenegro) Uroš Milovanović	(Portugal) Vizela	Loan	2 August 2024	
MF	(Martinique) Jonathan Varane	(England) Queens Park Rangers	Undisclosed	4 August 2024	
DF	(Spain) Enol Coto	(Spain) Amorebieta	Free	7 August 2024	
DF	(Ivory Coast) Axel Bamba	(France) Ajaccio	Contract terminated	9 August 2024	
FW	(Spain) Alejandro Lozano	(Spain) Real Unión	Loan	23 August 2024	
FW	(Spain) Alejandro Lozano	(Spain) San Fernando	Loan	5 January 2025	

== Pre-season and friendlies ==
20 July 2024 Friendly	Marino de Luanco	0–2	Sporting Gijón

23 July 2024 Friendly	Celta Vigo	2–1	Sporting Gijón

27 July 2024 Friendly	AVS	0–0	Sporting Gijón

31 July 2024 Friendly	Ponferradina	0–0	Sporting Gijón

3 August 2024 Friendly	Eibar	1–2	Sporting Gijón

7 August 2024 Friendly	Lugo	0–0	Sporting Gijón

10 August 2024 Friendly	Racing Santander	1–1	Sporting Gijón

== Competitions ==
=== Overall record ===
Competition	First match	Last match	Starting round	Final position	Record							
Competition	First match	Last match	Starting round	Final position	Pld	W	D	L	GF	GA	GD	Win %
Segunda División	18 August 2024	1 June 2025	Matchday 1		37	11	14	12	46	45	+1	29.73
Copa del Rey	30 October 2024	4 December 2024	First round	Second round	2	1	0	1	1	1	+0	50.00
Total					39	12	14	13	47	46	+1	30.77

Last updated: 25 April 2025
Source: Competitions

=== Segunda División ===
==== League table ====
Pos	Team	Pld	W	D	L	GF	GA	GD	Pts
9	Eibar	42	15	13	14	44	41	+3	58 (Note: Eibar finished ahead of Albacete on head-to-head points: Albacete 0–1 Eibar, Eibar 1–1 Albacete.)
10	Albacete	42	15	13	14	57	57	0	58
11	Sporting Gijón	42	14	14	14	57	54	+3	56
12	Burgos	42	15	10	17	41	48	−7	55 (Note: Burgos finished ahead of Cádiz and Córdoba on head-to-head points: Burgos 6 pts, Cádiz 5 pts, Córdoba 4 pts.)
13	Cádiz	42	14	13	15	55	53	+2	55

Source: LaLiga Hypermotion
Rules for classification: 1) Points; 2) Head-to-head points; 3) Head-to-head goal difference; 4) Goal difference; 5) Goals scored; 6) Fair-play points
(Note: Head-to-head record is used only after all the matches between the teams in question have been played)

==== Results summary ====
Overall								Home						Away					
Pld	W	D	L	GF	GA	GD	Pts	W	D	L	GF	GA	GD	W	D	L	GF	GA	GD
37	11	14	12	46	45	+1	47	8	5	6	25	22	+3	3	9	6	21	23	−2

Last updated: 25 April 2025.

==== Results by round ====
Round	1	2	3	4	5	6	7	8	9	10	11	12	13	14	15	16	17	18	19	20	21	22	23	24	25	26	27	28	29	30	31	32
Ground	H	H	A	H	A	A	H	A	H	A	H	A	H	A	H	A	H	A	H	A	H	A	H	A	H	H	A	H	A	H	A	H
Result	L	D	D	W	L	D	W	W	W	L	W	D	W	W	L	D	W	L	L	D	L	D	D	L	W	D	D	D	D	D	D	L
Position	14	16	18	11	14	15	13	7	5	8	5	7	3	2	3	3	4	4	9	9	9	9	9	10	9	9	9	10	11	12	13	16

Updated to match(es) played on 23 March 2025. Source:
A = Away; H = Home; W = Win; D = Draw; L = Loss

==== Matches ====
The match schedule was released on 26 June 2024.

18 August 2024 1	Sporting Gijón	1–2	Levante	Gijón
				Stadium: El Molinón

24 August 2024 2	Sporting Gijón	0–0	Eldense	Gijón
				Stadium: El Molinón

31 August 2024 4	Almería	1–1	Sporting Gijón	Almería

7 September 2024 4	Sporting Gijón	3–1	Oviedo	Gijón
				Stadium: El Molinón

14 September 2024 5	Racing Santander	1–0	Sporting Gijón	Santander

22 September 2024 6	Tenerife	1–1	Sporting Gijón	Tenerife

28 September 2024 7	Sporting Gijón	1–0	Zaragoza	Gijón
				Stadium: El Molinón

5 October 2024 8	Eibar	1–3	Sporting Gijón	Eibar

14 October 2024 9	Sporting Gijón	2–1	Castellón	Gijón
				Stadium: El Molinón

20 October 2024 10	Elche	2–1	Sporting Gijón	Elche

24 October 2024 11	Sporting Gijón	2–1	Huesca	Gijón
				Stadium: El Molinón

27 October 2024 12	Albacete	3–3	Sporting Gijón	Albacete

2 November 2024 13	Sporting Gijón	2–0	Cádiz	Gijón
				Stadium: El Molinón

10 November 2024 14	Burgos	0–2	Sporting Gijón	Burgos

16 November 2024 15	Sporting Gijón	1–2	Granada	Gijón
21:00				Stadium: El Molinón; Referee: Rafael Sánchez López

24 November 2024 16	Deportivo La Coruña	1–1	Sporting Gijón	A Coruña
16:15				Stadium: Riazor; Referee: Manuel Ángel Pérez Hernández

1 December 2024 17	Sporting Gijón	2–0	Córdoba	Gijón
21:00				Stadium: El Molinón; Referee: Saúl Ais Reig

9 December 2024 18	Cartagena	1–0	Sporting Gijón	Cartagena
20:30	Muñoz 71' (pen.)		Yáñez (red card) 68'	Stadium: Estadio Cartagonova; Referee: José Antonio Sánchez Villalobos

15 December 2024 19	Sporting Gijón	1–3	Racing Ferrol	Gijón
14:00				Stadium: El Molinón; Referee: Andrés Fuentes Molina

18 December 2024 20	Mirandés	1–1	Sporting Gijón	Miranda de Ebro
21:15				Stadium: Estadio de Anduva; Referee: Álvaro Moreno Aragón

21 December 2024 21	Sporting Gijón	1–3	Málaga	Gijón
18:30				Stadium: El Molinón

11 January 2025 22	Oviedo	1–1	Sporting Gijón	Oviedo

18 January 2025 23	Sporting Gijón	1–1	Elche	Gijón
				Stadium: El Molinón

26 January 2025 24	Granada	3–1	Sporting Gijón	Granada

1 February 2025 25	Sporting Gijón	2–0	Burgos	Gijón
				Stadium: El Molinón

8 February 2025 26	Sporting Gijón	0–0	Eibar	Gijón
				Stadium: El Molinón

16 February 2025 27	Levante	0–0	Sporting Gijón	Valencia

22 February 2025 28	Sporting Gijón	1–1	Almería	Gijón
				Stadium: El Molinón

1 March 2025 29	Zaragoza	1–1	Sporting Gijón	Zaragoza

8 March 2025 30	Sporting Gijón	1–1	Racing Santander	Gijón
				Stadium: El Molinón

15 March 2025 31	Córdoba	1–1	Sporting Gijón	Córdoba

23 March 2025 32	Sporting Gijón	0–2	Albacete	Gijón
16:15				Stadium: El Molinón

30 March 2025 33	Huesca	3–2	Sporting Gijón	Huesca
18:30

5 April 2025 34	Sporting Gijón	1–3	Tenerife	Gijón
21:00	Otero 50' (pen.)		González 69'; Rubio 71'; Gallego 84'	Stadium: El Molinón

13 April 2025 35	Eldense	1–2	Sporting Gijón	Elda
18:30	Ortuño 86'		Gelabert 37'; Dubasin 64' (pen.)	Stadium: Nuevo Pepico Amat; Referee: Álvaro Moreno Aragón

18 April 2025 36	Sporting Gijón	3–1	Mirandés	Gijón
19:00				Stadium: El Molinón; Referee: Rafael Sánchez López

25 April 2025 37	Cádiz	1–0	Sporting Gijón	Cádiz
20:30	Ramos 19'			Stadium: Nuevo Mirandilla

5 May 2025 38	Castellón	v	Sporting Gijón	Castellón de la Plana
20:30				Stadium: Nou Estadi Castàlia

=== Copa del Rey ===
30 October 2024 First round	Numancia	0–1	Sporting Gijón	Soria
20:00			Oyón 61'	Stadium: Estadio Los Pajaritos; Referee: Dámaso Arcediano Monescillo

4 December 2024 Second round	Racing Santander	1–0	Sporting Gijón	Santander
20:30	Vicente 79'			Stadium: El Sardinero; Referee: Daniel Palencia Caballero
