= Víctor Campuzano =

Spanish footballer, forward

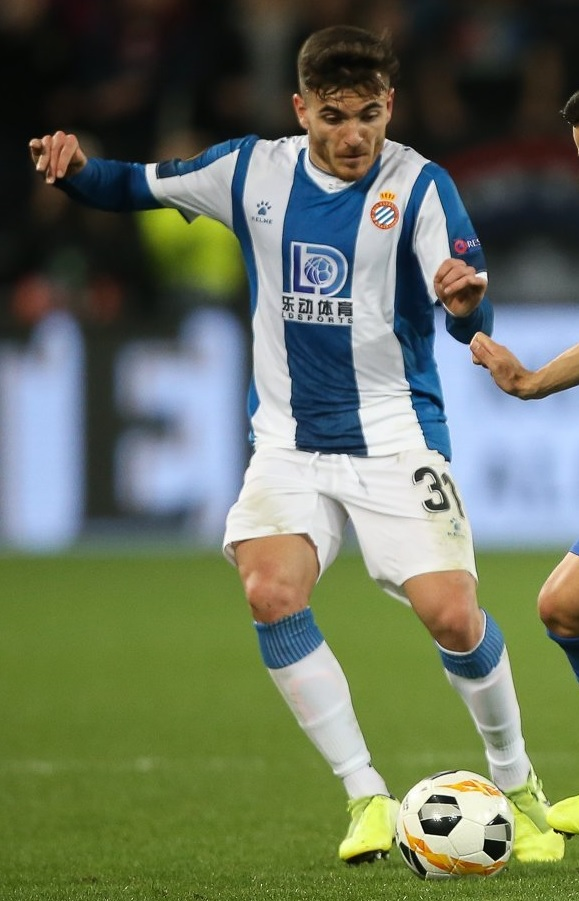
- Campuzano with Espanyol in 2019

Personal information
- Full name: Víctor Campuzano Bonilla
- Date of birth: 31 May 1997 (age 29)
- Place of birth: Barcelona, Spain
- Height: 1.73 m (5 ft 8 in)
- Position: Forward

Team information
- Current team: Sydney FC
- Number: 9

Youth career
- 2005–2008: Cubelles
- 2008–2011: Gavà
- 2011–2016: Espanyol

Senior career*
Years	Team	Apps	(Gls)
2016–2018	Real Madrid B	47	(8)
2018–2019	Espanyol B	33	(16)
2019–2021	Espanyol	24	(0)
2021–2025	Sporting Gijón	106	(14)
2025–	Sydney FC	24	(4)

International career
2015	Spain U19	1	(0)
- * Club domestic league appearances and goals as of 26 April 2026

Víctor Campuzano Bonilla (Spanish: [ˈbiɣtoɾ kampuˈθano βoˈniʎa]; born 31 May 1997) is a Spanish professional footballer who plays as a forward for A-League Men club Sydney FC.

== Club career ==
Born in Barcelona, Catalonia, Campuzano joined RCD Espanyol's youth setup in 2011, from CF Gavà's youth setup EF Gavà. On 17 May 2016, after finishing his formation, he signed a three-year contract with Real Madrid and was assigned to the reserves in Segunda División B.

Campuzano made his senior debut on 8 October 2016, coming on as a second-half substitute for Francisco Tena in a 0–1 away loss against CD Toledo. He scored his first goal on 11 December, netting his team's first in a 2–2 draw at CD Mensajero.

On 13 July 2018, Campuzano returned to Espanyol after agreeing to a one-year deal, and was assigned to the B-team also in the third division. He made his first team debut on 15 August of the following year, starting and scoring a brace in a 3–0 win against FC Luzern in the UEFA Europa League.

Campuzano made his La Liga debut on 18 August 2019, replacing Wu Lei in a 0–2 home loss against Sevilla FC. Despite scoring five times in the Europa League for the club, he failed to score in 20 league appearances during the campaign, as his side suffered relegation.

On 1 February 2021, after featuring rarely, Campuzano terminated his contract with the Pericos and moved to fellow Segunda División side Sporting de Gijón on a four-and-a-half-year deal just hours later.

On 15 September 2025, Campuzano signed a two-year deal with A-League Men side Sydney FC. He scored his first goal for the club in his second league appearance on 25 October 2025, in a 2–1 home victory against the Central Coast Mariners at Leichhardt Oval, Sydney.

== Career statistics ==
As of 26 April 2026

Club	Season	League			Cup		Continental		Total	
Club	Season	Division	Apps	Goals	Apps	Goals	Apps	Goals	Apps	Goals
Real Madrid Castilla	2016–17	Segunda División B	25	6	0	0	—		25	6
Real Madrid Castilla	2017–18	Segunda División B	22	2	0	0	—		22	2
Real Madrid Castilla	Total		47	8	0	0	0	0	47	8
Espanyol B	2018–19	Segunda División B	32	15	1	0	—		33	15
Espanyol B	2019–20	Segunda División B	1	1	0	0	—		1	1
Espanyol B	Total		33	16	1	0	0	0	34	16
RCD Espanyol	2019–20	La Liga	20	0	1	0	8	5	29	5
RCD Espanyol	2020–21	Segunda Division	4	0	1	0	—		4	0
RCD Espanyol	Total		24	0	2	0	8	5	33	5
Sporting Gijón	2020–21	Segunda Division	8	0	0	0	—		8	0
Sporting Gijón	2021–22	Segunda Division	18	1	1	0	—		19	1
Sporting Gijón	2022–23	Segunda Division	20	2	2	0	—		22	2
Sporting Gijón	2023–24	Segunda Division	21	6	0	0	—		21	6
Sporting Gijón	2024–25	Segunda Division	39	5	2	0	—		41	5
Sporting Gijón	Total		106	14	5	0	0	0	111	14
Sydney FC	2025–26	A-League Men	24	4	0	0	—		24	4
Career total			234	42	8	0	8	5	249	47

== Personal life ==
Campuzano supports the Cleveland Cavaliers in the National Basketball Association (NBA) and Espanyol Barcelona in La Liga.
