= Riestra =

Riestra is a surname. Notable people with the surname include:

- Abraham Riestra (born 1988), Mexican footballer
- Antonio Riestra (born 1969), Mexican cinematographer
- Javier Valle Riestra (1932–2024), Peruvian lawyer and politician
- Miguel Valle Riestra (1820–1913), Peruvian military man
- Nico Riestra (born 2005) Spanish footballer
