= Christian Ferreres =

Spanish footballer (born 2004)

Personal information
- Full name: Christian Ferreres Laviada
- Date of birth: 8 September 2004 (age 22)
- Place of birth: Gijón, Spain
- Height: 1.77 m (5 ft 10 in)
- Position: Winger

Team information
- Current team: Sporting B
- Number: 19

Youth career
- 2012–2020: Sporting Gijón
- 2020–2021: Roda
- 2021–2023: Villarreal

Senior career*
| Years | Team | Apps | (Gls) |
| 2023–2024 | Villarreal C | 24 | (2) |
| 2024–2025 | Elche B | 5 | (0) |
| 2025 | Sporting C | 9 | (6) |
| 2025– | Sporting B | 33 | (10) |
| 2026– | Sporting Gijón | 1 | (0) |

International career
| 2019 | Spain U16 | 1 | (0) |
- * Club domestic league appearances and goals as of 23 August 2026

Christian Ferreres Laviada (born 8 September 2004) is a Spanish footballer who plays as a winger for Sporting Atlético.

== Club career ==
Born in Gijón, Asturias, Ferreres began his career with Sporting de Gijón. In July 2019, it was reported that he agreed to a pre-contract with Villarreal CF, but the move later collapsed.

In the 2020 summer, however, Ferreres was called up to Sporting's reserves for the pre-season, but never showed up at Escuela de Fútbol de Mareo, and announced his move to the Yellow Submarine in November; a judicial decision in February 2022 ruled in favor of Sporting and sentenced Villarreal to pay € 300,000 for his transfer. After playing for affiliate side CD Roda and the Juvenil squads, he made his senior debut with the C-team during the 2023–24 season, in Tercera Federación.

In May 2024, Ferreres rejected a renewal offer from Villarreal, and moved to another reserve team, Elche CF Ilicitano, on 21 August. Rarely used, he returned to Sporting the following 31 January, being initially a member of the C-side in the regional leagues.

Ferreres quickly established himself as a regular starter for Sporting Atlético, and made his first team debut on 23 August 2026, coming on as a late substitute for Juan Otero in a 1–0 Segunda División home win over Burgos CF.

== Personal life ==
Ferreres' older brother Abraham is also a footballer and a winger. He too played for Sporting and Roda.
