= Nico Riestra =

Spanish footballer (born 2007)

Personal information
- Full name: Nicolás Riestra Coalla
- Date of birth: 30 May 2007 (age 19)
- Place of birth: Gijón, Spain
- Position: Winger

Team information
- Current team: Sporting C

Youth career
- Asunción
- 2015–: Sporting Gijón

Senior career*
Years	Team	Apps	(Gls)
2023–	Sporting C	12	(1)
2025–	Sporting Gijón	1	(0)
- * Club domestic league appearances and goals as of 16 November 2025

Nicolás "Nico" Riestra Coalla (born 30 May 2007) is a Spanish footballer who plays as a winger for Sporting de Gijón C.

== Career ==
Riestra was born in Gijón, Asturias, and joined Sporting de Gijón's youth sides at the age of eight, from Asunción CF. After progressing through the youth categories, he made his senior debut with the C-team on 5 November 2023, coming on as a late substitute in a 2–0 Primera Asturfútbol home win over CD Mosconia.

Riestra scored his first goal on 4 February 2024, netting the C's fourth in a 4–0 home routing of Unión Comercial CF. On 20 June 2025, he renewed his contract with the club until 2028.

On 29 October 2025, before even having appeared with the reserves, Riestra made his first team debut by starting in a 1–0 away win over Caudal Deportivo, for the season's Copa del Rey. He made his professional debut on 16 November, replacing fellow youth graduate Gaspar Campos in a 1–1 Segunda División home draw against SD Eibar.
