= Diego Matabuena =

Spanish footballer (born 2007)

Personal information
- Full name: Diego Matabuena Álvarez
- Date of birth: 20 August 2007 (age 19)
- Place of birth: Oviedo, Spain
- Position: Midfielder

Team information
- Current team: Sporting B
- Number: 8

Youth career
- Roces
- 2017–2025: Sporting Gijón

Senior career*
Years	Team	Apps	(Gls)
2023–2025	Sporting C	8	(1)
2025–	Sporting B	32	(3)
2026–	Sporting Gijón	1	(0)
- * Club domestic league appearances and goals as of 4 October 2026

Diego Matabuena Álvarez (born 20 August 2007), sometimes known as Mata, is a Spanish footballer who plays a midfielder for Sporting Atlético.

== Career ==
Born in Oviedo, Asturias, Matabuena joined Sporting de Gijón's youth sides at the age of ten, from CD Roces. He made his senior debut with the C-team on 17 September 2023, playing the last 20 minutes of a 1–0 Primera Asturfútbol away win over Unión Comercial CF.

On 16 May 2025, after finishing his formation, Matabuena renewed his contract until 2029 and was promoted to the reserves in Tercera Federación. He made his first team debut with the Rojiblancos on 4 October 2026, coming on as a second-half substitute for fellow youth graduate Enol Prendes in a 3–2 Segunda División home win over RC Celta Fortuna; he also provided the assist to Guille Rosas' third goal.
