= Bruno Rubio =

Spanish footballer (born 2007)

Personal information
- Full name: Bruno Rubio Argüelles
- Date of birth: 18 May 2007 (age 19)
- Place of birth: Barcelona, Spain
- Position: Attacking midfielder

Team information
- Current team: Sporting B

Youth career
- 2013–2025: Sporting Gijón

Senior career*
Years	Team	Apps	(Gls)
2023–2025	Sporting C	12	(5)
2025–	Sporting B	24	(11)
2026–	Sporting Gijón	1	(0)
- * Club domestic league appearances and goals as of 5 September 2026

Bruno Rubio Argüelles (born 18 May 2007) is a Spanish footballer who plays an attacking midfielder for Sporting Atlético.

== Career ==
Born in Barcelona, Catalonia, Rubio began his career with Sporting de Gijón at the age of six. He made his senior debut with the C-team on 16 December 2023, playing the entire second half of a 4–0 Primera Asturfútbol home routing of CD Roces.

On 24 July 2025, after finishing his formation, Rubio renewed his contract until 2028 and was definitely promoted to the C's. He first appeared with the reserves in November, becoming a regular starter afterwards and scoring in a regular basis.

Rubio made his first team debut with the Rojiblancos on 5 September 2026, coming on as a late substitute for Juan Otero in a 2–0 Segunda División home loss to Girona FC.
