= Alex Diego =

Alex Diego may refer to:

- Alex Diego (footballer, born 1985), Mexican football manager and former player
- Alex Diego (footballer, born 2008), Spanish football left-back
