= Iker Martínez (footballer) =

Spanish footballer

Personal information
- Full name: Iker Martínez Martínez
- Date of birth: 7 October 2004 (age 22)
- Place of birth: El Entrego, Spain
- Height: 1.86 m (6 ft 1 in)
- Position: Right-back

Team information
- Current team: Sporting Gijón
- Number: 26

Youth career
- Alcázar
- 2011–2018: Sporting Gijón
- 2018–2021: Llano 2000
- 2021–2022: Arenal
- 2022–2023: Almería

Senior career*
Years	Team	Apps	(Gls)
2023–2024	Sporting C	28	(1)
2024–	Sporting B	52	(0)
2024–	Sporting Gijón	4	(0)
- * Club domestic league appearances and goals as of 28 August 2026

Iker Martínez Martínez (born 7 October 2004) is a Spanish professional footballer who plays as a right-back for Sporting de Gijón.

== Career ==
Born in El Entrego, Asturias, Martínez joined Sporting de Gijón's youth sides at the age of seven, from Alcázar CF. He left the club after seven seasons, and subsequently played for SD Llano 2000 and CD Arenal before agreeing to a deal with UD Almería in April 2022.

On 20 July 2023, after finishing his formation, Martínez returned to Sporting and was initially assigned to the C-team in Primera Asturfútbol. An undisputed starter for the C's, he also featured with the reserves in Tercera Federación during the campaign.

Martínez made his first team debut with the Rojiblancos on 24 August 2024, coming on as a late substitute for fellow youth graduate Guille Rosas in a 0–0 Segunda División home draw against CD Eldense.
