= Dani Queipo =

Spanish footballer

Personal information
- Full name: Daniel Queipo Menéndez
- Date of birth: 22 May 2002 (age 24)
- Place of birth: Oviedo, Spain
- Height: 1.68 m (5 ft 6 in)
- Position: Winger

Team information
- Current team: Cultural Leonesa
- Number: 22

Youth career
- Atlético Lugones
- Xeitosa
- 2019–2021: Sporting Gijón

Senior career*
Years	Team	Apps	(Gls)
2021–2022	Sporting B	44	(9)
2022–2026	Sporting Gijón	107	(6)
2026–	Cultural Leonesa	0	(0)
- * Club domestic league appearances and goals as of 6 June 2026

Daniel "Dani" Queipo Menéndez (born 22 May 2002) is a Spanish professional footballer who plays as a left winger for Cultural y Deportiva Leonesa.

== Career ==
Born in Oviedo, Asturias, Queipo joined Sporting de Gijón's Mareo from Xeitosa CF. He made his senior debut with the reserves on 31 October 2020, coming on as a late substitute for Berto González in a 1–0 Segunda División B home win over CD Numancia.

On 22 June 2021, Queipo renewed his contract with Sporting and was definitely promoted to the B-team, now in Tercera División RFEF. He scored his first senior goal on 17 October, scoring the B's third in a 5–0 home routing over CD Tuilla.

Queipo made his first team debut on 13 August 2022, starting in a 1–1 away draw against CD Mirandés in Segunda División. On 29 November, he renewed his contract until 2027, being definitely promoted to the main squad.

Queipo scored his first professional goal on 22 January 2023, netting the winner in a 1–0 home success over Real Zaragoza. On 25 July 2026, after four full seasons with the first team, he terminated his link, and joined Cultural y Deportiva Leonesa on 17 August.
