= Pierre Mbemba (footballer, born 2004) =

French footballer

Personal information
- Full name: Pierre Noble Mbemba
- Date of birth: 11 April 2004 (age 22)
- Place of birth: Brazzaville, Congo
- Height: 1.85 m (6 ft 1 in)
- Position: Centre-back

Team information
- Current team: Nîmes

Youth career
- Albertville
- 2017–2019: Chambéry
- 2019–2021: Nîmes
- 2021–2023: Saint-Étienne

Senior career*
Years	Team	Apps	(Gls)
2021–2023	Saint-Étienne II	3	(0)
2023–2024	Sporting C	16	(2)
2023–2026	Sporting B	44	(0)
2024–2026	Sporting Gijón	4	(0)
2026–	Nîmes	0	(0)
- * Club domestic league appearances and goals as of 31 May 2026

Pierre Noble Mbemba (born 11 April 2004) is a Congolese professional footballer who plays for Nîmes Olympique. Mainly a centre-back, he can also play as a defensive midfielder.

== Career ==
Born in Brazzaville, Mbemba moved to France at early age and played for UOA Albertville and Chambéry SF before joining Nîmes Olympique in 2019. In June 2021, he left for AS Saint-Étienne.

In July 2023, after playing for ASSE's reserve side, Mbemba signed for Spanish side Sporting de Gijón, being initially assigned to the C-team in Primera Asturfútbol. He would later begin to feature with the reserves in Tercera Federación in November.

Mbemba made his first team debut with the Asturians on 30 October 2024, starting in a 1–0 away win over CD Numancia, for the season's Copa del Rey. He made his professional debut on 4 December, playing the full 90 minutes in a 1–0 away loss to Racing de Santander, also for the national cup.

Mbemba made his Segunda División debut on 26 January 2025, replacing Lander Olaetxea late into a 3–1 away loss to Granada CF. On 11 July, he renewed his link with the club until 2027.
