= Pierre Mbemba =

Pierre Mbemba may refer to:

- Pierre Mbemba (footballer, born 1988), Belgian football defender
- Pierre Mbemba (footballer, born 2004), Congolese football defender
