= Alejandro Lozano (footballer) =

Spanish footballer (born 2005)

Personal information
- Full name: Alejandro Lozano Cárdenas
- Date of birth: 14 February 2005 (age 21)
- Place of birth: San Pedro de Rozados, Spain
- Position: Winger

Team information
- Current team: Getafe B

Youth career
- Sporting Gijón
- 2019–2020: Santa Marta
- 2020–2022: Sporting Gijón

Senior career*
Years	Team	Apps	(Gls)
2022–2026	Sporting B	50	(14)
2023–2026	Sporting Gijón	5	(0)
2024–2025	→ Real Unión (loan)	5	(0)
2025	→ San Fernando (loan)	11	(0)
2026–	Getafe B	0	(0)

International career^{‡}
2023	Spain U18	2	(0)
2024	Spain U19	2	(0)
- * Club domestic league appearances and goals as of 24 May 2026 ‡ National team caps and goals as of 04:40, 8 March 2024 (UTC)

Alejandro Lozano Cárdenas (born 14 February 2005) is a Spanish footballer who plays mainly as a left winger for Getafe CF B.

== Club career ==
Lozano was born in San Pedro de Rozados, Salamanca, Castile and León, and played for UD Santa Marta and Sporting de Gijón as a youth. He made his senior debut with the reserves on 9 October 2022, starting and scoring his team's second in a 4–0 Tercera Federación home routing of L'Entregu CF.

Lozano made his first team debut for Sporting on 11 August 2023, coming on as a late substitute for fellow youth graduate Pablo García in a 2–0 Segunda División away loss to Real Valladolid.

On 23 August 2024, Lozano signed for Real Unión on a season-long loan. The following 5 January, he moved to Segunda Federación side San Fernando CD also in a temporary deal.

Upon returning, Lozano played for Sporting Atlético back in the fifth tier before agreeing to a two-year deal with another reserve team, Getafe CF B, on 22 July 2026.

== International career ==
On 11 April 2023, Lozano was called up to the Spain under-18 national team, making his debut seven days later in a 4–0 routing of Switzerland.

== Personal life ==
Lozano's father Raúl was also a footballer. A midfielder, he too played for Sporting's reserve and first teams.
