= Álex Oyón =

Spanish footballer

Personal information
- Full name: Alejandro García Oyón
- Date of birth: 23 January 2003 (age 23)
- Place of birth: Gijón, Spain
- Height: 1.71 m (5 ft 7 in)
- Position: Forward

Team information
- Current team: Arenas
- Number: 23

Youth career
- Roces
- 2011–2021: Sporting Gijón

Senior career*
Years	Team	Apps	(Gls)
2021–2026	Sporting Gijón B	92	(28)
2021–2026	Sporting Gijón	5	(0)
2023–2024	→ Linares (loan)	17	(0)
2026–	Arenas	4	(0)
- * Club domestic league appearances and goals as of 26 September 2026

Alejandro García "Álex" Oyón (born 23 January 2003) is a Spanish professional footballer who plays as a forward for Primera Federación club Arenas.

== Club career ==
Born in Gijón, Asturias, Oyón joined Sporting de Gijón's Mareo in 2011, from CD Roces. On 19 July 2019, he agreed to a professional contract with the club.

Oyón made his senior debut with the reserves on 7 March 2021, coming on as a late substitute in a 0–1 Segunda División B away loss against Real Oviedo Vetusta. His first goal as a senior came on 12 September, as he scored the equalizer for the B's in a 3–2 Tercera División RFEF home win over L'Entregu CF.

Oyón made his first team debut on 12 November 2021, replacing fellow youth graduate Pablo García in a 0–1 home loss against Real Sociedad B in the Segunda División. On 1 September 2023, after being mainly used with the B-team, he was loaned to Primera Federación side Linares Deportivo for the 2023–24 season.

Recalled in January 2024, Oyón spent the entire 2024–25 campaign as a member of the main squad, but featured rarely.
