= Alex Diego (footballer, born 2008) =

Spanish footballer (born 2008)

Personal information
- Full name: Alex Diego García
- Date of birth: 18 April 2008 (age 18)
- Place of birth: Langreo, Spain
- Position: Left-back

Team information
- Current team: Sporting B
- Number: 16

Youth career
- Eulalia Álvarez
- 2016–2025: Sporting Gijón

Senior career*
Years	Team	Apps	(Gls)
2024–2025	Sporting C	2	(0)
2025–	Sporting B	10	(0)
2025–	Sporting Gijón	0	(0)
- * Club domestic league appearances and goals as of 3 December 2025

Alex Diego García (born 18 April 2008) is a Spanish footballer who plays as a left-back for Sporting Atlético.

== Club career ==
Born in Langreo, Asturias, Diego joined Sporting de Gijón's Mareo in 2016, aged eight, from CP Eulalia Álvarez Lorenzo. He made his senior debut with the C-team on 5 May 2024, starting in a 2–0 Primera Asturfútbol home loss to EI San Martín.

Diego first appeared with the reserves on 13 April 2025, playing the full 90 minutes in a 2–0 Tercera Federación home loss to CD Covadonga. He subsequently became a regular starter for the B-team, and made his first team debut on 3 December of that year, starting in a 2–0 away win over CD Mirandés, for the season's Copa del Rey.
