= Enol Prendes =

Spanish footballer (born 2004)

Personal information
- Full name: Enol Prendes Ortiz
- Date of birth: 31 May 2004 (age 22)
- Place of birth: Pola de Laviana, Spain
- Height: 1.75 m (5 ft 9 in)
- Position: Attacking midfielder

Team information
- Current team: Sporting B
- Number: 25

Youth career
- 2007–2014: Alcava
- 2014–2023: Sporting Gijón

Senior career*
Years	Team	Apps	(Gls)
2022–	Sporting B	65	(8)
2023–2024	Sporting C	4	(1)
2025–	Sporting Gijón	2	(0)
- * Club domestic league appearances and goals as of 23 November 2025

Enol Prendes Ortiz (born 31 May 2004) is a Spanish footballer who plays for Sporting Atlético. Mainly an attacking midfielder, he can also play as a forward.

== Club career ==
Born in Pola de Laviana, Asturias, Prendes joined Sporting de Gijón's Mareo in 2014, from hometown club ACD Alcava. He made his senior debut with the reserves on 10 April 2022, coming on as a half-time substitute in a 1–1 Tercera División RFEF away draw against Real Titánico, and scored his first goal three days later in a 5–1 home routing of CD Mosconia.

In 2023, after finishing his formation, Prendes was promoted to the C-team in Primera Asturfútbol, but still featured mostly for the B's during the season. A striker during the most of his youth spell, he was converted into an attacking midfielder during the 2024–25 campaign, and appeared with the first team in January 2025, in a friendly against UP Langreo.

On 21 May 2025, Prendes renewed his contract with the Rojiblancos until 2027. He made his professional debut on 23 August, replacing Álex Corredera late into a 1–0 Segunda División away win over AD Ceuta FC.
