= Miguel Valle Riestra =

Peruvian military man (1820–1913)

Miguel Valle Riestra (May 7, 1820 – September 5, 1913) was a Peruvian military man, who fought in two wars against Chile, known as the War of the Confederation and the War of the Pacific, and rose to the rank of colonel. Colonel Valle Riestra was taken prisoner by the victorious Chilean army in both of the wars, but he survived the experience and was 93 years old at the time of his death in 1913.
