= San Pedro de Rozados =

- municipality
- Location in Salamanca

- Location in Spain
- Coordinates: 40°47′25″N 5°44′15″W
- Country: Spain
- Autonomous community: Castile and León
- Province: Salamanca
- Comarca: Campo de Salamanca

Government
  - Mayor: Lucio Rodríguez López (People's Party)

Area
  - Total: 102 km^{2} (39 sq mi)
- Elevation: 977 m (3,205 ft)

Population (2025-01-01)
  - Total: 273
  - Density: 2.68/km^{2} (6.93/sq mi)
- Time zone: UTC+1 (CET)
  - Summer (DST): UTC+2 (CEST)
- Postal code: 37183

San Pedro de Rozados is a municipality located in the province of Salamanca, Castile and León, Spain. As of 2016 the municipality has a population of 307 inhabitants.
