= Gaspar Campos =

Spanish footballer

Personal information
- Full name: Gaspar Campos-Ansó Fernández
- Date of birth: 27 March 2000 (age 26)
- Place of birth: Gijón, Spain
- Height: 1.75 m (5 ft 9 in)
- Position: Midfielder

Team information
- Current team: Sporting Gijón
- Number: 7

Youth career
- 2014–2019: Sporting Gijón

Senior career*
Years	Team	Apps	(Gls)
2019–2020	Sporting B	24	(4)
2020–	Sporting Gijón	179	(24)
2022–2023	→ Burgos (loan)	29	(7)

International career
2021	Spain U21	3	(0)
- * Club domestic league appearances and goals as of 6 June 2026

Gaspar Campos-Ansó Fernández (born 27 March 2000) is a Spanish professional footballer who plays as a midfielder for Sporting de Gijón.

== Club career ==
Campos was born in Gijón, Asturias, and joined Sporting de Gijón's Mareo in 2008, aged eight. He made his senior debut with the reserves on 10 March 2019, coming on as a late substitute in a 0–3 Segunda División B away loss against Racing de Santander.

Definitely promoted to the B-team for the 2019–20 campaign, Campos scored his first senior goal on 1 December 2019, netting the equalizer in a 2–1 home win against Las Rozas CF. He made his first team debut the following 25 June, starting in a 1–1 draw at Rayo Vallecano in the Segunda División championship.

Campos started to feature regularly for the main squad in the 2020–21 season, and scored his first professional goals on 25 November 2020, netting a brace in a 3–1 home win against CE Sabadell FC. On 18 August 2022, he was loaned to fellow second division side Burgos CF, for one year.

== Personal life ==
Campos' grandfather Juan Manuel was a senator for Asturias during the 2000–2004 period.
