= Juan Otero =

Colombian footballer (born 1995)

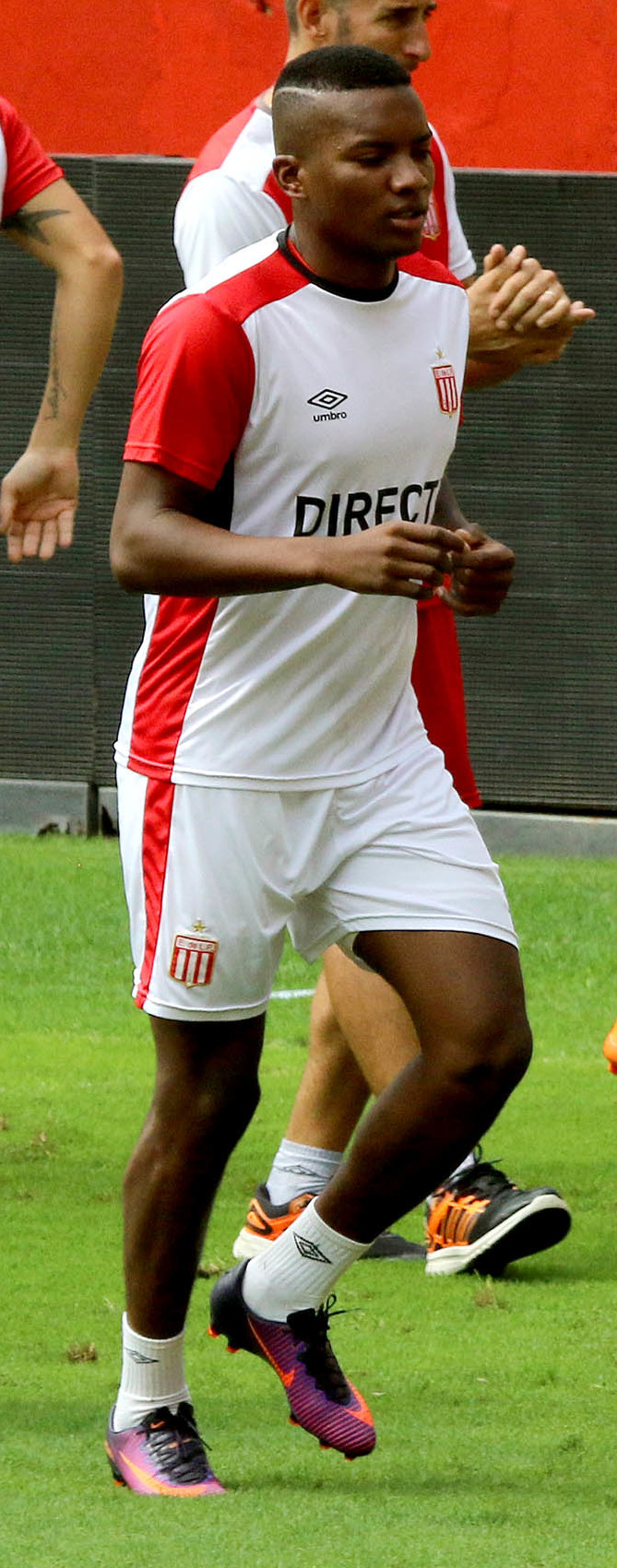
- Otero in 2017

Personal information
- Full name: Juan Ferney Otero Tovar
- Date of birth: 26 May 1995 (age 31)
- Place of birth: Sipí, Colombia
- Height: 1.82 m (6 ft 0 in)
- Position: Forward

Team information
- Current team: Sporting Gijón
- Number: 19

Youth career
- Deportivo Pereira
- Santa Fe

Senior career*
Years	Team	Apps	(Gls)
2014–2017	Fortaleza	36	(8)
2015–2016	→ Deportivo B (loan)	34	(19)
2017	→ Estudiantes (LP) (loan)	12	(2)
2018	Estudiantes (LP)	17	(7)
2018–2020	Amiens	64	(3)
2021–2022	Santos Laguna	45	(4)
2022–2024	América	11	(1)
2022–2024	→ Sporting Gijón (loan)	79	(16)
2024–	Sporting Gijón	70	(27)

International career
2015	Colombia U20	9	(1)
- * Club domestic league appearances and goals as of 6 June 2026

Juan Ferney Otero Tovar (born 26 May 1995) is a Colombian professional footballer who plays as a forward for Segunda División club Sporting Gijón.
