= Sporting Atlético =

Association football club in Spain

- Founded: 1960; 66 years ago
- Ground: Campo Pepe Ortiz, Gijón, Asturias, Spain
- Capacity: 1,600
- President: Javier Fernández
- Head coach: Samuel Baños
- League: Tercera Federación – Group 2
- 2025–26: Tercera Federación – Group 2, 3rd of 18
Home colours	Away colours

Sporting Atlético is a Spanish football club based in Gijón, in the autonomous community of Asturias. Founded in 1960 it is the reserve team of Sporting de Gijón, and currently plays in Tercera Federación – Group 2, holding home games at Escuela de Fútbol de Mareo with a 3,000-seat capacity.

Reserve teams in the Spanish football league system play in the same football pyramid as their senior team rather than a separate league, although reserve teams cannot play in the same division as their senior team. Reserve teams are also no longer permitted to enter the Copa del Rey. In addition, only under-23 players, or under-25 players with a professional contract, can switch between senior and reserve teams.

== History ==
=== La Camocha ===
Sociedad Deportiva La Camocha was founded in 1955, joining the Royal Spanish Football Federation two years later. On 30 July 1966, the team signed an agreement to be affiliated with Real Gijón as their reserve team.

The following year, La Camocha's rights in Tercera División were acquired by Gijón and the team was renamed Club Atlético Gijón, being relegated to Primera Regional after three seasons.

=== Sporting Gijón B ===
Sporting de Gijón B was founded as Club Deportivo Gijón in 1960. Because the club started in the lowest level in Asturias, Segunda Regional, Real Gijón used other clubs to promote its youth players such as La Camocha. In 1970, La Camocha was replaced by Deportivo Gijón as sole affiliate after both clubs were to start in Primera Regional. La Camocha eventually became an independent club and was renamed Atlético Camocha Sociedad Deportiva. Deportivo Gijón finished as runner-up in 1971–72 and lost the promotion play-off to C.D. Acero 3–8 on aggregate, promoting to the fourth level two years later after winning the regional league.

In the following decades, Sporting B fluctuated between division four and Segunda División B, first reaching the latter in 1979–80, but being immediately relegated. In 1991, it first reached the promotion playoffs in the category, repeating the feat in 1996 and 1997, but consecutively falling short.

In early July 2011, despite finishing 19th in the third division table, with the subsequent relegation, Sporting B was reinstated in the category by buying the vacant place left by the administrative relegation of Universidad de Las Palmas CF.

In 2018, the club qualified for the promotion playoffs to Segunda División, 21 years after their last participation. The club beat Cornellà in the first round but lost the two legs against Elche in the second. On 6 July 2023, the club returned to their previous name of Sporting Atlético.

== Club background ==
- Club Deportivo Gijón (1960–79)
- Sporting de Gijón Atlético CF (1979–91)
- Sporting de Gijón B (1991–2023)
- Sporting Atlético (2023–)

== Season to season ==
- As a farm team

Season	Tier	Division	Place	Copa del Rey
1966–67	5	2ª Reg.	1st	
1967–68	4	1ª Reg.	3rd	
1968–69	4	1ª Reg.	2nd	
1969–70	4	1ª Reg.	2nd	
1970–71	4	1ª Reg.	11th	
1971–72	4	1ª Reg.	2nd	
1972–73	4	1ª Reg.	8th	
1973–74	4	Reg. Pref.	1st	
1974–75	3	3ª	11th	Second round
1975–76	3	3ª	8th	Third round
1976–77	3	3ª	15th	First round
1977–78	4	3ª	2nd	First round
1978–79	4	3ª	1st	First round

Season	Tier	Division	Place	Copa del Rey
1979–80	3	2ª B	17th	First round
1980–81	4	3ª	1st	
1981–82	3	2ª B	12th	First round
1982–83	3	2ª B	16th	
1983–84	3	2ª B	13th	
1984–85	3	2ª B	10th	
1985–86	3	2ª B	16th	First round
1986–87	4	3ª	4th	
1987–88	4	3ª	2nd	
1988–89	4	3ª	1st	
1989–90	3	2ª B	11th	
1990–91	3	2ª B	12th	

- As a reserve team

Season	Tier	Division	Place
1991–92	3	2ª B	3rd
1992–93	3	2ª B	14th
1993–94	3	2ª B	12th
1994–95	3	2ª B	5th
1995–96	3	2ª B	1st
1996–97	3	2ª B	1st
1997–98	3	2ª B	8th
1998–99	3	2ª B	7th
1999–2000	3	2ª B	12th
2000–01	3	2ª B	5th
2001–02	3	2ª B	17th
2002–03	4	3ª	3rd
2003–04	4	3ª	3rd
2004–05	4	3ª	5th
2005–06	4	3ª	7th
2006–07	4	3ª	4th
2007–08	4	3ª	2nd
2008–09	3	2ª B	16th
2009–10	3	2ª B	12th
2010–11	3	2ª B	19th

Season	Tier	Division	Place
2011–12	3	2ª B	10th
2012–13	3	2ª B	13th
2013–14	3	2ª B	9th
2014–15	3	2ª B	11th
2015–16	3	2ª B	17th
2016–17	4	3ª	1st
2017–18	3	2ª B	2nd
2018–19	3	2ª B	11th
2019–20	3	2ª B	15th
2020–21	3	2ª B	9th / 6th
2021–22	5	3ª RFEF	2nd
2022–23	5	3ª Fed.	2nd
2023–24	5	3ª Fed.	2nd
2024–25	5	3ª Fed.	4th
2025–26	5	3ª Fed.	3rd
2026–27	5	3ª Fed.	

- 31 seasons in Segunda División B
- 16 seasons in Tercera División
- 6 seasons in Tercera Federación/Tercera División RFEF

== Current squad ==
As of 7 September 2026.

Note: Flags indicate national team as defined under FIFA eligibility rules; some limited exceptions apply. Players may hold more than one non-FIFA nationality.

No.	Pos.	Nation	Player
1	GK	ESP	Mario Ordóñez
2	DF	ESP	Iker Martínez
3	DF	ESP	Alex Diego
4	DF	ARG	Federico Lussenhoff
5	DF	ESP	Lucas Ferreras
6	MF	ESP	Marco Suárez
7	MF	ESP	Christian Ferreres
8	MF	ESP	Diego Matabuena
9	FW	ESP	Miguel Conde
10	MF	ESP	Enol Prendes
13	GK	ESP	Dani Fox
14	DF	ESP	Adrián Sancho
15	DF	ESP	Pablo García
16	DF	MAR	Moha Dahmouni

No.	Pos.	Nation	Player
17	MF	ESP	Oriol Pallàs
18	FW	ESP	Mario Bustos
19	FW	ESP	Tzalo
20	MF	ESP	Nico Riestra
21	MF	ESP	Dani Paul
22	DF	ESP	Dani Corral
23	MF	ESP	Dani Noya
24	DF	ESP	Rodri Herrero
25	GK	ESP	Guillermo Iglesias
26	DF	USA	Norberto Suárez
27	DF	MEX	Sebas Valenzuela
31	MF	ESP	Mateo Sierra
—	MF	ESP	Bruno Rubio

=== From Sporting C ===
Note: Flags indicate national team as defined under FIFA eligibility rules; some limited exceptions apply. Players may hold more than one non-FIFA nationality.

No.	Pos.	Nation	Player
29	MF	ESP	Maruan Jakkal

=== Out on loan ===
Note: Flags indicate national team as defined under FIFA eligibility rules; some limited exceptions apply. Players may hold more than one non-FIFA nationality.

No.	Pos.	Nation	Player
—	DF	ESP	Javier Llaneza (at Colunga until 30 June 2027)

=== Current technical staff ===
Role	Name
Head coach	(Spain) Aitor Zulaika
Assistant coach	(Spain) Nacho Cases
Delegate	(Spain) Carlos Manuel Manjarín Pereda
Goalkeeping coach	(Spain) Daniel Fernández Lozano
Fitness coaches	(Spain) Álvaro Vázquez García
Physiotherapist	(Spain) Sergio Vicente Guerrero Álvarez (Spain) Pedro Diaz Herrero
Kit men	(Spain) Alejandro Tuya Moriyon

== Honours ==
=== Official ===
- Segunda División B: 1995–96 (Group 2), 1996–97 (Group 1)
- Tercera División Group 2: 1978–79, 1980–81, 1988–89, 2016–17
- Copa de la Liga: 1982–83 Segunda División B – Group I
- Copa RFEF (Asturias tournament): 1996, 2003, 2014, 2016

=== Friendly ===
- Trofeo Emma Cuervo: 2008

== Stadium ==
Sporting de Gijón B play most of its home games at Escuela de Fútbol de Mareo (field 1, also named Pepe Ortiz), which also acts as both the training ground and football academy for the first team. It has a capacity of 3,000 spectators.
