= Sporting de Gijón C =

Sporting Gijón C
- Full name: Real Sporting de Gijón "C"
- Founded: 1975; 51 years ago 2023; 3 years ago (refounded)
- Stadium: Campo Pepe Ortiz
- Capacity: 1,600
- President: Javier Fernández
- Head coach: Felipe Vega
- League: Primera Asturfútbol
- 2025–26: Primera Asturfútbol, 1st of 19 (champions)
Home colours	Away colours	Third colours

Real Sporting de Gijón "C" is a Spanish football club based in Gijón, in the autonomous community of Asturias. They are the second reserve team of Sporting de Gijón, and play in the Primera Asturfútbol.

== History ==
=== Sporting Promesas (1975–1981) ===
The first time Real Sporting had a second reserve team was under the name of Sporting de Gijón Promesas. It was founded in 1975 and competed until 1981 achieving two promotions in its two first seasons.

=== Sporting C (2023–present) ===
On 25 July 2023, Real Sporting created again the second reserve team by absorbing local club Racing de La Guía, that achieved in that season promotion to Regional Preferente, today called Primera Asturfútbol.

In its first season, the club achieved promotion to Tercera Federación and later ended the season as champion of the Primera Asturfútbol. However, it finally did not promote due to Sporting Atlético, first reserve team, failed to promote to Segunda Federación.

== Season to season ==
=== Sporting Promesas ===
Season	Tier	Division	Place	Copa del Rey
1975–76	6	2ª Reg.	2nd	
1976–77	5	1ª Reg.	2nd	
1977–78	5	Reg. Pref.	9th	
1978–79	5	Reg. Pref.	10th	
1979–80	5	Reg. Pref.	2nd	
1980–81	5	Reg. Pref.	5th	

=== Sporting C ===
Season	Tier	Division	Place
2023–24	6	1ª Ast.	1st
2024–25	6	1ª Ast.	1st
2025–26	6	1ª Ast.	
