= Sporting de Gijón =

Association football club in Spain

Sporting Gijón
- Full name: Real Sporting de Gijón, S.A.D.
- Nickname: Los Rojiblancos (The Red-and-Whites)
- Short name: RSG, Sporting
- Founded: 1 July 1905; 121 years ago (as Sporting Club Gijonés)
- Stadium: Estadio Municipal El Molinón – Enrique Castro "Quini"
- Capacity: 29,371
- Owner: Orlegi Sports
- President: Alejandro Irarragorri
- Head coach: Nicolás Larcamón
- League: Segunda División
- 2025–26: Segunda División, 10th of 22
- Website: realsporting.com
| Home colours | Away colours | Third colours |

Real Sporting de Gijón, S.A.D. (Spanish pronunciation: [reˈal esˈpoɾtin de xiˈxon]), commonly known as Real Sporting, Sporting Gijón, or simply Sporting is a Spanish professional football club from Gijón, Principality of Asturias. Founded on 1 July 1905, it plays in the Segunda Division. Known as Los Rojiblancos because of their red and white striped jerseys, their home ground is El Molinón stadium, the oldest professional football ground in Spain, in use since at least 1908. Traditionally their red and white shirts are accompanied by blue shorts with the socks also being blue. Its Asturian name is Real Sporting de Xixón.

The most important milestones of the club were in the 1970s and 1980s, when it finished as runner-up of the 1978–79 La Liga and played two finals of the Copa del Rey in 1981 and 1982.

Real Sporting is also one of only nine Spanish teams that have never played below the second division. Its local rivals are Real Oviedo from the neighbouring city slightly further inland with whom they compete in the Asturian derby.

== History ==
=== 1905–1940: First years ===
The club was established in 1905 with the name Sporting Club Gijonés, Anselmo López being the first club president. The first game of the club is dated on 18 August 1907, against Sport Ovetense. The decline of other local clubs like Gijón Sport Club (founded in 1903) and Sportiva Gijonesa allowed Sporting Gijonés to become the main team in the city. In 1912, King Alfonso XIII accepted the Royal patronage of the club for the Spanish Crown, introducing the term "Real" (Spanish for Royal) to its name, becoming Real Sporting Club Gijonés.

In 1914, Sporting Gijón won its first Regional Championship of Asturias, success repeated two years later when the club started the first steps to buy El Molinón, where Sporting started to play its games in 1915. On 2 April 1916, a new change took place to adopt today's denomination, Real Sporting de Gijón. Because of the win at the Regional Championship, on 24 April 1917 the club made its debut in the Copa del Rey, but was eliminated in the first round by Arenas Club de Getxo. Sporting lost both games by 0–1 in Gijón and 0–7 at the Basque Country.

On 9 October 1921, Manolo Meana became the first Sporting Gijón player to be called up with the Spanish national team, for a friendly game against Belgium. In 1929, Sporting Gijón joined Segunda División. In its first season, the club finished in the fourth position.

Logo during Real Gijón era.

=== 1940–1970: Real Gijón era ===
From 1940 until 1970, due to a temporary law forbidding the use of foreign words in football club names, the team's official denomination was Real Gijón.

In 1944, the club was promoted to La Liga for the first time as champion of the 1943–44 Segunda División. The first game in the top tier was played on 24 September 1944, against Español at Sarriá. The game finished without goals. The first goal was scored in the next game against Deportivo de La Coruña, by Gundemaro, but the first win did not arrive until the week 6, when the team beat Atlético Aviación by 2–0.

Until the 1970s, Sporting alternated between both divisions, spending the entire 1960s in Segunda División. At the end of the 1960–61 Segunda División, the club was initially relegated to Tercera División after losing the relegation playoffs against Burgos, but the resignation of CD Condal to remain in the second tier allowed Sporting to play a repechage playoff against Sevilla Atlético and Castellón. In the first match, Sporting tied 3–3 against Castellón. The winner of the match was decided by a coin toss; after winning the two previous coin tosses during the match, choosing tails in both, captain Pepe Ortiz won by choosing tails again, giving Sporting the victory. In the playoff final, Sporting defeated Sevilla Atlético 2–1.

=== 1970–1992: The golden years and EuroSporting ===
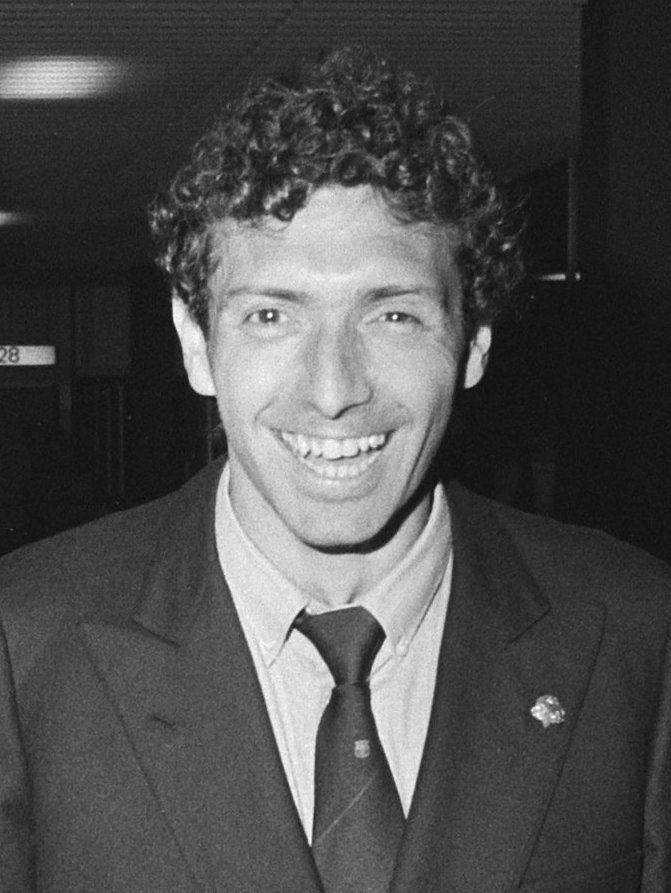
Quini, Sporting's all-time top scorer, was one of the club's best players during their golden years.

In 1970, with the name of "Sporting" recovered, the club would start its consolidation in La Liga despite a relegation to Segunda División in 1975. This year would mean the start of the golden era of the club.

Just after promoting in 1976, Sporting Gijón started the 1977–78 season by accumulating eight matches without losses. Finally, the Rojiblancos finished in the fifth position qualifying for the first time to the UEFA Cup.

Players like Quini, Cundi, Enzo Ferrero or Antonio Maceda and others would make history in the 1978–79 club's season, considered the best one in the history of the club. The season started with the first round of the UEFA Cup, where on 13 September 1978, Sporting beat Torino 3–0 at El Molinón. In the second round, Sporting was eliminated by Red Star Belgrade. The club finished the first half of La Liga leading the table, tied in points with Real Madrid, but a 26th matchday 0–1 loss to the Merengues would ultimately dash their title hopes.

In 1981, the club played for the first time the Cup Final. In the game played at Estadio Vicente Calderón on 18 June 1981, Sporting was defeated 1–3 by Barcelona. Former Sporting Gijón player Quini, considered as the most important player in the club's history, scored two goals for the Blaugranas. Sporting repeated success in 1982, but this time Real Madrid beat the Rojiblancos 1–2. During the 1980s Sporting accumulated four more participations at the UEFA Cup, albeit all with first round eliminations. On 16 September 1987, Sporting won the first leg game against Arrigo Sacchi's AC Milan, but a 0–3 defeat in Italy cut off Sporting's possibilities. In the previous 1986–87 season, Sporting beat Barcelona at Camp Nou by 0–4, the biggest win away in the club's history in La Liga. One year before, Manuel Vega-Arango, president since 1977, left office.

The last UEFA Cup participation was during the 1991–92 season. Sporting Gijón eliminated Partizan in a penalty shootout, but were defeated by Steaua București in the second round.

On 6 October 1992, Sporting Gijón played its 1,000th game in La Liga.

=== 1992–2008: Decline of the club ===
In 1992, following the law, Real Sporting de Gijón became a Sociedad Anónima Deportiva. Its official name thereafter has been Real Sporting de Gijón, S.A.D. The internal financial crisis and the departure of important players triggered the decline of the club, pushing it to the lower positions in La Liga. In the 1994–95 season, Sporting remained in La Liga thanks to winning the relegation playoffs against Lleida, but three years later, following a disastrous 1997–98 campaign where Sporting only earned 13 points (two wins and seven draws in 38 games), the club was relegated to Second Division, ending its 21-year continuous stretch in La Liga.

Due to the financial crisis during the 2000s, the club was menaced by its possible dissolution and was forced to sell the Escuela de Fútbol de Mareo to the Municipal Town Hall for €12m in August 2001. The 2003–04 season started with several doubts after the transfer of David Villa to Zaragoza and the election of Marcelino García Toral as head coach, who previously relegated the reserve team to Tercera División. In spite of this, the club nearly achieved promotion to La Liga, but fell short, finishing in the fifth position. After accumulating €51m of debts in its worst years, Real Sporting was close to being administratively relegated at the end of the 2004–05 season.

=== 2008–2012: Return to La Liga with Manuel Preciado ===
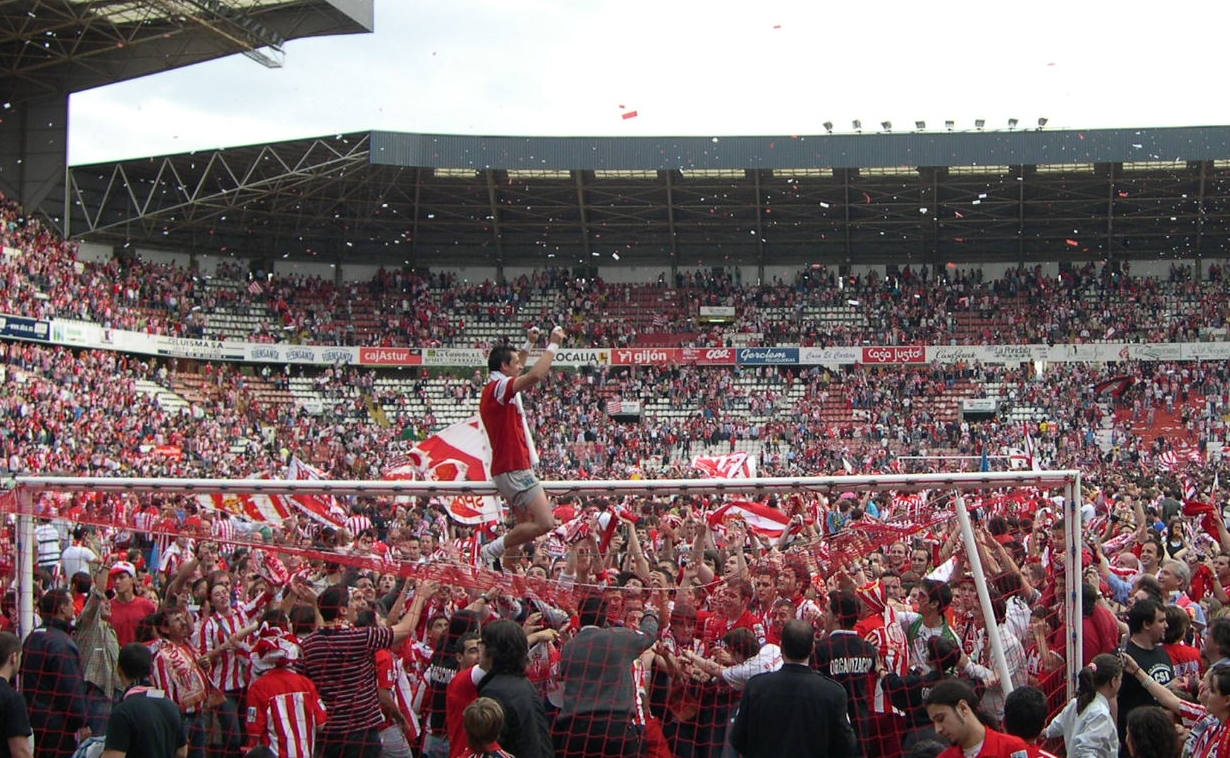
Football players celebrate with their fans the club's return to top-flight, 15 June 2008

With Manuel Preciado at the helm of the team since 2006, the 2007–08 season started with the club unbeaten during the first nine games. Finally, on 15 June 2008, the club secured promotion back to La Liga after beating 2–0 Eibar in the last round.

In its first season after the return, the 2008–09, Sporting conceded 20 goals in its first five games, but achieved important wins such as 2-3 at the Mestalla against Valencia and a 1–0 win at home against Sevilla. In a season where the team broke the La Liga record of 29 consecutive games without drawing (ending with a 1–1 finish with Athletic Bilbao on 3 May 2009), Sporting avoided relegation in the last round after a 2-1 win against bottom placed Recreativo de Huelva.

On 2 April 2011, they beat Real Madrid 1–0 at Santiago Bernabéu Stadium to end Real manager José Mourinho's nine-year home league unbeaten run. Their 10th place finish made this season the club's best since its previous promotion.

The 2011–12 season started without wins in the first eight games and the team remained in the relegation positions almost all the season. On 31 January 2012, after a 5–1 loss against Real Sociedad, Manolo Preciado was sacked. The Cantabrian coach ended his era after nearly six years at the club. Javier Clemente was subsequently hired, but sealed relegation on the final matchday, bringing a new financial crisis to the club.

=== 2014–2022: Los guajes and a new decline ===
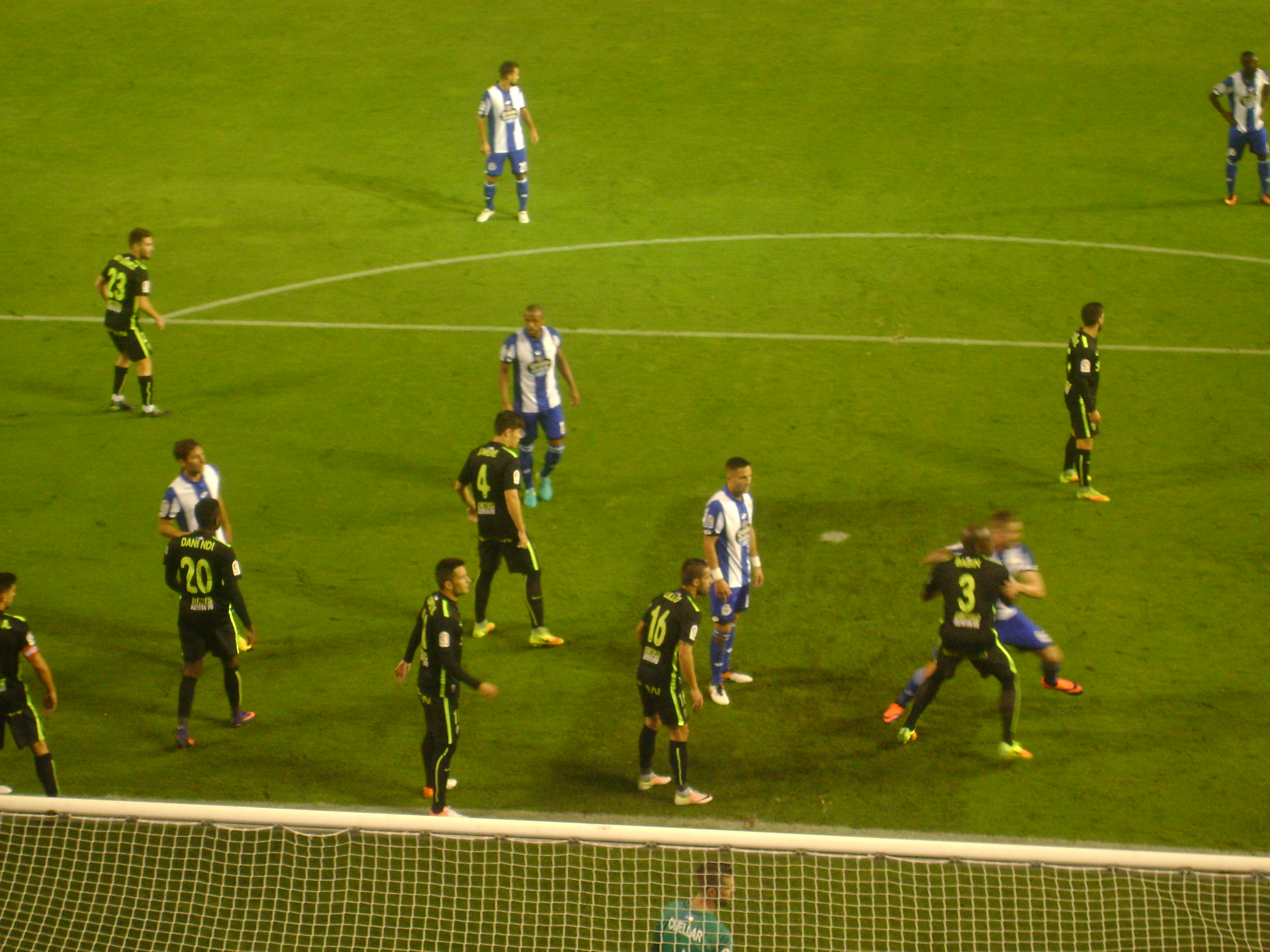
Deportivo de La Coruña vs. Sporting de Gijón.

On 4 May 2014, Abelardo Fernández was appointed as head coach after José Ramón Sandoval was sacked. In his first season, he could not win Gijón promotion to La Liga after being eliminated in the semi-finals of the play-offs by Las Palmas.

However, the manager extended his contract for two years. Sporting was not allowed to sign any player out from the reserve team during 2014–15 season due to the non-payments, but despite this disadvantage, Sporting once again returned to La Liga with a squad where 17 players played before in the reserve team or any of the youth teams of the club. After only two losses all season, Sporting promoted in the last round by a 3-0 win over Real Betis at Benito Villamarín stadium and a late equaliser conceded by rival Girona against CD Lugo.

During its comeback season, Sporting had the same sanction due to a delay in payments to the players during the previous season. The club was only allowed to sign, by loan, three new under-23 players without experience in La Liga (Antonio Sanabria from Roma, Alen Halilović from Barcelona and Omar Mascarell from Real Madrid).

The season started with a 0–0 draw against Real Madrid, managed by Rafa Benítez, at El Molinón. Despite an irregular path, Sporting obtained very important wins like a 1–0 at the Mestalla, a 2–1 against Atlético Madrid, and a 5–1 against Real Sociedad. After earning a 1–1 draw at Getafe, the club finally avoided relegation in the last round after beating Villarreal by 2–0 and taking advantage of Real Betis' win against Getafe. The era of Abelardo ended in January 2017, when he left the club after earning only five points in 15 matches and, changing managers, the club was finally relegated again to Segunda División.

In the successive years, Sporting remained in Segunda División, only playing the promotion play-offs in 2018. The club continued a decline until 2022, where it narrowly avoided relegation to the third division. Abelardo came back to ensure the place in Segunda in the last four rounds.

=== 2022–present: Grupo Orlegi as new owners ===
On 28 June 2022, majority shareholder Javier Fernández sold the club to Mexican group Orlegi Sports by €43m, thus becoming the second highest sale of a club in Spain. Alejandro Irarragorri became the first foreign President of the club.

After two first seasons narrowly avoiding relegation to the third division, in 2024 Sporting Gijón qualified again to the promotion play-offs to La Liga. However, it was eliminated in the first round against Espanyol.

== Club colours and crest ==
Flag of Gijón.

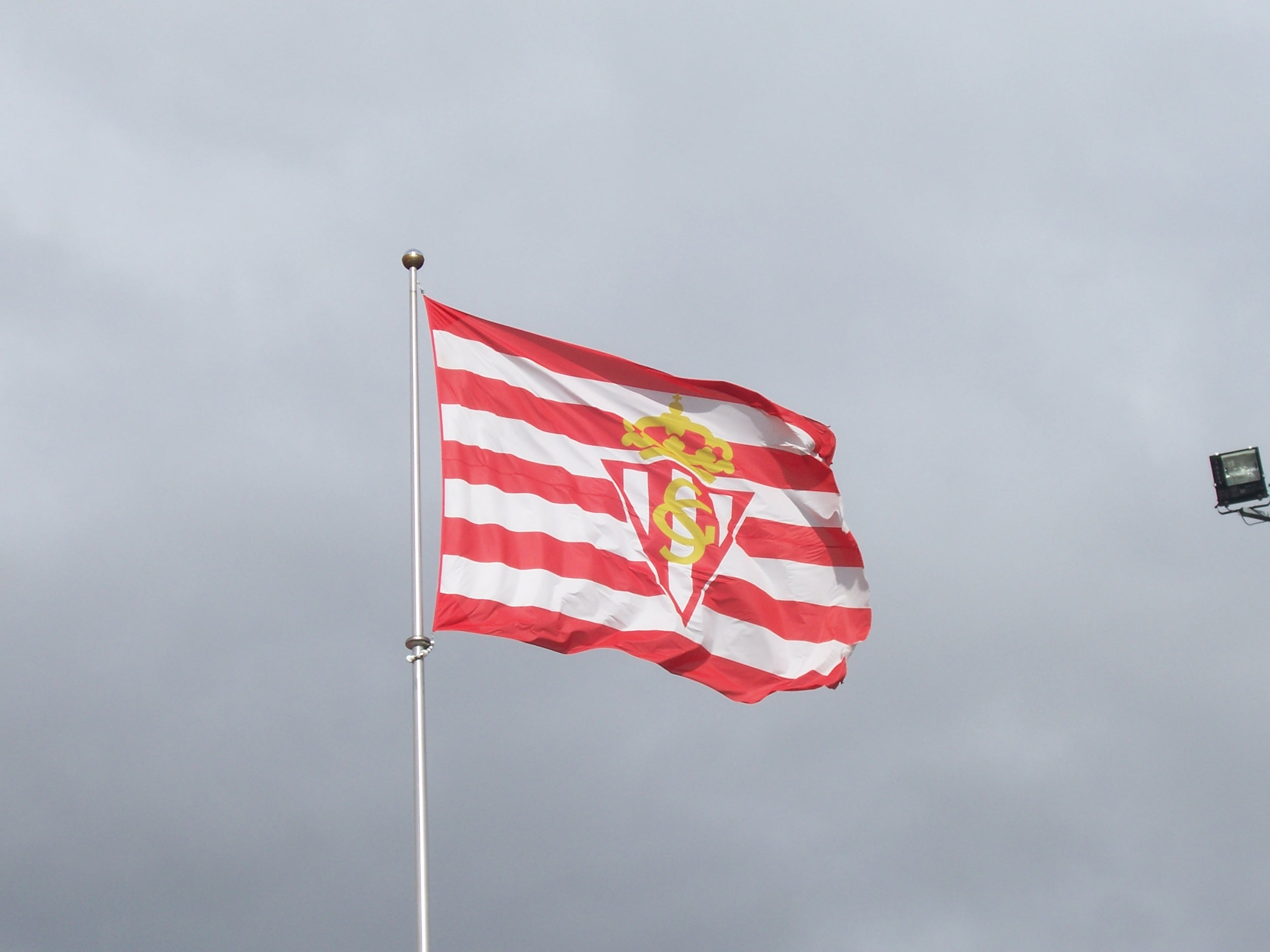
Club's flag.

Real Sporting de Gijón have worn red and white striped jerseys since their inception, being the first Spanish team to wear red and white, as both Athletic Bilbao and Atlético Madrid wore blue and white until 1909. The colors are those of the official flag of Gijón, which itself is based on the flag of the maritime province of Gijón, established in 1845. The color of the shorts alternated between blue and white, as in the first years there was not any officiality for its colors. In the 1910s, finally, the color blue was established as the color of the shorts of the first kit.

Currently, Sporting wears both blue shorts and socks but until the 1980s they were black. In the 1990s, Sporting wore white shorts and socks, until the supporters voted to come back to the traditional blue.

Like most old football clubs, Real Sporting de Gijón did not initially have any badge displayed on their shirts. Their first official badge was introduced in the 1920s. It consisted of a traditionally shaped shield split into three sections, representing the club and the city.

From 1931 to 1936, during the Spanish Second Republic, the badge consisted of a circular shield and had the royal crown in the top replaced by a mural crown.

The club's badge is a triangle with red and white vertical stripes with 'S' (for Sporting) and 'G' (for Gijón) intertwined, in gold, across them. A crown in the top symbolizes the royal patronage.

=== Flag ===
The club's official flag consists of nine equal horizontal stripes of red (top and bottom) alternating with white in a rectangular field in a 2:3 ratio. The club logo is displayed in the centre.

=== Kit manufacturers and shirt sponsors ===
| Period | Kit manufacturer | Shirt sponsors |
|---|---|---|
| 1979–1986 | Adidas | none |
| 1986–1989 | Adidas | Cajastur |
| 1989–1991 | Rasán | Cajastur |
| 1991–1993 | Lotto | Cajastur |
| 1993-1994 | Lotto | Cajastur; Asturias |
| 1994–1997 | Joma | Cajastur; Asturias |
| 1997–1999 | Astore | none |
| 1999–2001 | Astore | Gijón |
| 2002–2011 | Astore | Gijón; Asturias |
| 2011–2013 | Kappa | Gijón; Asturias |
| 2013–2016 | Kappa | Gijón |
| 2016–2017 | Nike | Gijón |
| 2017–2018 | Nike | Teslacard |
| 2018–2019 | Nike | Pastón |
| 2019–2020 | Nike | Interwetten |
| 2020–2022 | Nike | Integra Energía; Gijón |
| 2022–2024 | Puma | Integra Energía; Gijón |
| 2023–2024 | Puma | Jalisco |
| 2024–2026 | Puma | Siroko |
| 2026–present | Siroko | Siroko |

=== Home kit evolution ===
1905–1910s
1905–1984
1984–1989
1989–1997
1997–2023
2023–present

== Stadium ==
El Molinón, with a capacity of 29,371, holds the games of Sporting de Gijón.

Despite existing since at least 1908, Sporting did not start to use it until 1915. Before this year, the club played its games in different zones of the city. Firstly at San Lorenzo beach and later in the pitches of Prau Redondu (near El Humedal), La Matona in Somió, that was rented by the club for three months by paying 100 pesetas, and La Flor de Valencia in La Guía.

In 2018, the stadium was renamed as El Molinón-Enrique Castro "Quini" after the death of the club's all-time top scorer Quini.

== Academy ==
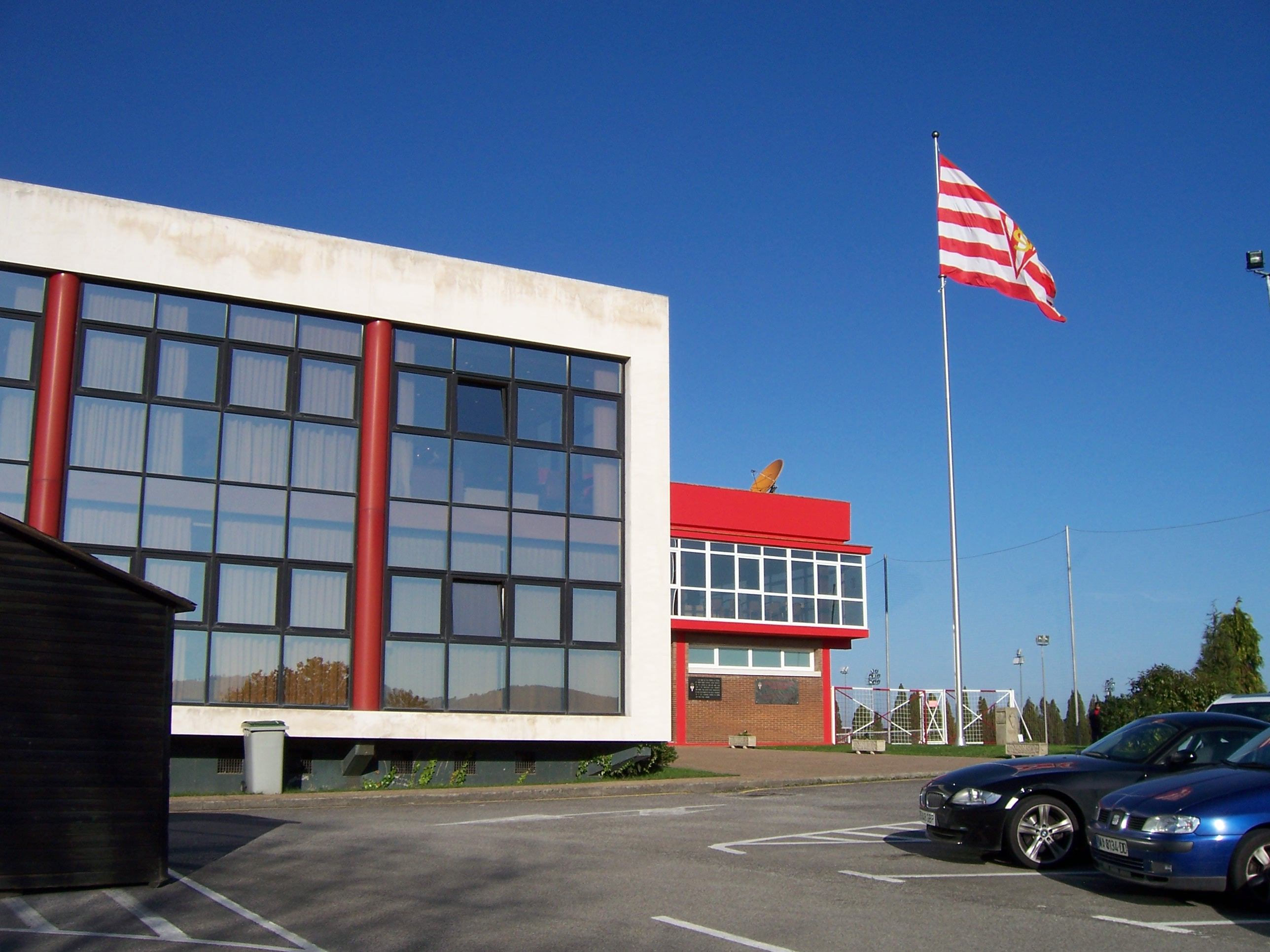
The club headquarters, in Mareo

The Escuela de Fútbol de Mareo is the training ground and academy base of Sporting de Gijón. It was opened on 28 March 1978 and also contains the club headquarters

Located just 7 km away from the city center and covering 112,000 m^{2}, it is used for training and youth teams matches. At present, facilities include inter alia, eight pitches, one service building (including team catering areas), a gymnasium, and a medical centre. The main pitch, where Sporting de Gijón B plays its games, is called Campo Pepe Ortiz and has a capacity for 3,000 people.

Mareo is a cantera, bearing several famous football players like Eloy, Ablanedo, Luis Enrique, Abelardo, Manjarín, Juanele and David Villa, a 2010 World Champion with the Spain national team.

In addition to Mareo, Sporting Gijón has a second academy located in Logroño, also called Mareo.

== Supporters ==
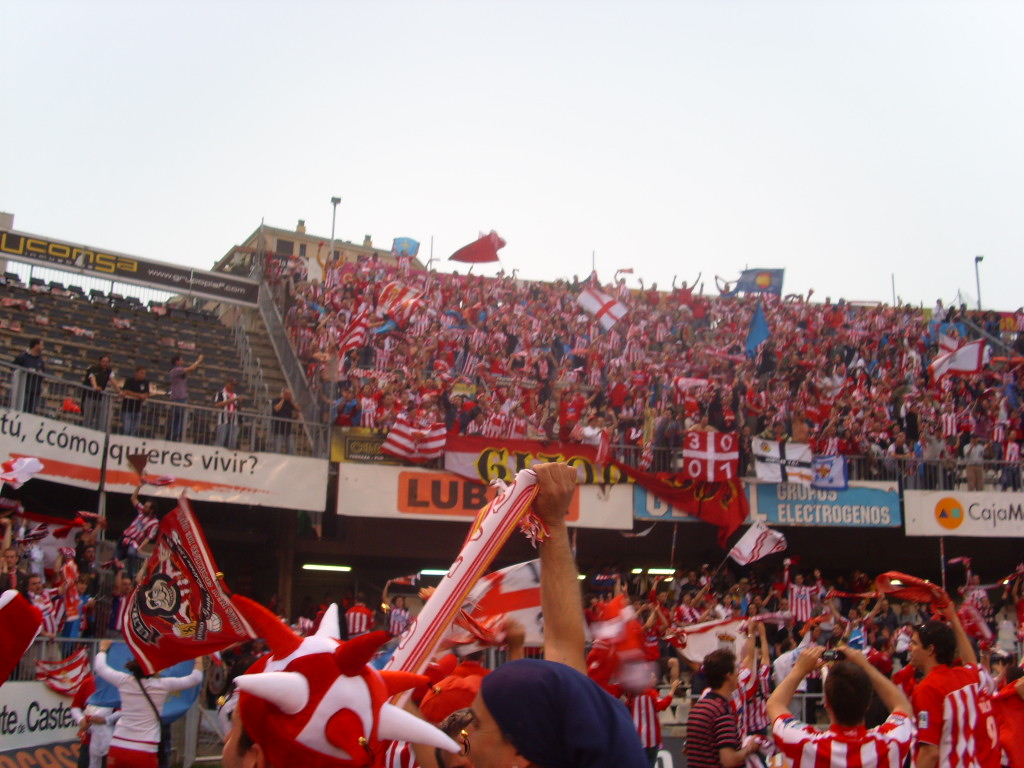
La Mareona, at Castalia in May 2008.

Sporting de Gijón supporters commonly call themselves Sportinguistas in order to show their dedication to the club. Sportinguistas are widely regarded by fans as one of the most loyal, best travelling, and most cheerful supporter groups in La Liga, providing under fans positively regarded atmospheres in the competition. When following their team in large groups through the country, they are referred to as La Mareona, Spanish for The Big Tide, composed mainly by 240 groups of supporters or peñas.

About 300,000 fans showed up when Sporting's promotion was celebrated in June 2008.

Sporting finished the 2015–16 season with 23,400 season tickets; this record would be beaten in August 2016, when the club reached the 24,078 tickets sold, and again in the 2017–18 season, with 24,402 season tickets despite suffering a relegation in the previous season.

== Rivalries ==
The team's historic rival is Real Oviedo. They compete in the Asturian derby.

== Honours ==
=== National titles ===
- La Liga: runners-up, 1978–79
- Copa del Rey: runners-up, 1980–81, 1981–82
- Segunda División: winners, 1943–44, 1950–51, 1956–57, 1969–70, 1976–77; runners-up 1929–30, 2014–15

=== Individual honours ===
==== Pichichi Trophy ====
- La Liga: Quini (3) (1973–74, 1975–76, 1979–80)
- Segunda División: Ricardo (1956–57), Solabarrieta (1966–67), Quini (2) (1969–70, 1976–77)

==== Zamora Trophy ====
- La Liga: Ablanedo II (3) (1984–85, 1985–86, 1989–90)
- Segunda División: Roberto (2005–06), Cuéllar (2014–15)

== Seasons ==
Chart of Sporting Gijón league performance 1929–present

| Season | Tier | Division | Place | Copa del Rey |
|---|---|---|---|---|
| 1929 | 2 | 2ª | 4th | Round of 32 |
| 1929–30 | 2 | 2ª | 2nd | Round of 32 |
| 1930–31 | 2 | 2ª | 4th | Round of 16 |
| 1931–32 | 2 | 2ª | 3rd | Quarter-finals |
| 1932–33 | 2 | 2ª | 6th | Round of 16 |
| 1933–34 | 2 | 2ª | 6th | Round of 16 |
| 1934–35 | 2 | 2ª | 3rd | Round of 16 |
| 1935–36 | 2 | 2ª | 3rd | Third round |
| 1939–40 | 2 | 2ª | 3rd | Round of 16 |
| 1940–41 | 2 | 2ª | 3rd | Third round |
| 1941–42 | 2 | 2ª | 1st | Round of 32 |
| 1942–43 | 2 | 2ª | 1st | Round of 32 |
| 1943–44 | 2 | 2ª | 1st | Round of 32 |
| 1944–45 | 1 | 1ª | 7th | Round of 16 |
| 1945–46 | 1 | 1ª | 9th | Round of 16 |
| 1946–47 | 1 | 1ª | 10th | First round |
| 1947–48 | 1 | 1ª | 14th | Sixth round |
| 1948–49 | 2 | 2ª | 6th | Fifth round |
| 1949–50 | 2 | 2ª | 3rd | Second round |
| 1950–51 | 2 | 2ª | 1st | Quarter-finals |

| Season | Tier | Division | Place | Copa del Rey |
|---|---|---|---|---|
| 1951–52 | 1 | 1ª | 13th | |
| 1952–53 | 1 | 1ª | 7th | Round of 16 |
| 1953–54 | 1 | 1ª | 16th | |
| 1954–55 | 2 | 2ª | 4th | |
| 1955–56 | 2 | 2ª | 7th | |
| 1956–57 | 2 | 2ª | 1st | |
| 1957–58 | 1 | 1ª | 12th | Round of 16 |
| 1958–59 | 1 | 1ª | 15th | Round of 16 |
| 1959–60 | 2 | 2ª | 5th | Quarter-finals |
| 1960–61 | 2 | 2ª | 13th | Round of 32 |
| 1961–62 | 2 | 2ª | 13th | First round |
| 1962–63 | 2 | 2ª | 5th | Round of 32 |
| 1963–64 | 2 | 2ª | 2nd | First round |
| 1964–65 | 2 | 2ª | 3rd | Quarter-finals |
| 1965–66 | 2 | 2ª | 3rd | Round of 32 |
| 1966–67 | 2 | 2ª | 2nd | First round |
| 1967–68 | 2 | 2ª | 5th | Round of 32 |
| 1968–69 | 2 | 2ª | 5th | |
| 1969–70 | 2 | 2ª | 1st | Fourth round |
| 1970–71 | 1 | 1ª | 12th | Round of 32 |

| Season | Tier | Division | Place | Copa del Rey |
|---|---|---|---|---|
| 1971–72 | 1 | 1ª | 11th | Round of 16 |
| 1972–73 | 1 | 1ª | 14th | Semi-finals |
| 1973–74 | 1 | 1ª | 13th | Fifth round |
| 1974–75 | 1 | 1ª | 14th | Fourth round |
| 1975–76 | 1 | 1ª | 18th | Round of 16 |
| 1976–77 | 2 | 2ª | 1st | Third round |
| 1977–78 | 1 | 1ª | 5th | Semi-finals |
| 1978–79 | 1 | 1ª | 2nd | Third round |
| 1979–80 | 1 | 1ª | 3rd | Semi-finals |
| 1980–81 | 1 | 1ª | 7th | Runners-up |
| 1981–82 | 1 | 1ª | 14th | Runners-up |
| 1982–83 | 1 | 1ª | 8th | Semi-finals |
| 1983–84 | 1 | 1ª | 13th | Quarter-finals |
| 1984–85 | 1 | 1ª | 4th | Quarter-finals |
| 1985–86 | 1 | 1ª | 6th | Third round |
| 1986–87 | 1 | 1ª | 4th | Second round |
| 1987–88 | 1 | 1ª | 9th | Round of 16 |
| 1988–89 | 1 | 1ª | 13th | Round of 16 |
| 1989–90 | 1 | 1ª | 13th | Quarter-finals |
| 1990–91 | 1 | 1ª | 5th | Semi-finals |

| Season | Tier | Division | Place | Copa del Rey |
|---|---|---|---|---|
| 1991–92 | 1 | 1ª | 8th | Semi-finals |
| 1992–93 | 1 | 1ª | 12th | Round of 16 |
| 1993–94 | 1 | 1ª | 14th | Round of 16 |
| 1994–95 | 1 | 1ª | 18th | Semi-finals |
| 1995–96 | 1 | 1ª | 18th | Round of 16 |
| 1996–97 | 1 | 1ª | 15th | Third round |
| 1997–98 | 1 | 1ª | 20th | Second round |
| 1998–99 | 2 | 2ª | 9th | Fourth round |
| 1999–2000 | 2 | 2ª | 9th | First round |
| 2000–01 | 2 | 2ª | 7th | Round of 64 |
| 2001–02 | 2 | 2ª | 6th | Round of 16 |
| 2002–03 | 2 | 2ª | 10th | Round of 64 |
| 2003–04 | 2 | 2ª | 5th | Round of 64 |
| 2004–05 | 2 | 2ª | 11th | Round of 64 |
| 2005–06 | 2 | 2ª | 9th | First round |
| 2006–07 | 2 | 2ª | 13th | Second round |
| 2007–08 | 2 | 2ª | 3rd | Second round |
| 2008–09 | 1 | 1ª | 14th | Quarter-finals |
| 2009–10 | 1 | 1ª | 15th | Round of 32 |
| 2010–11 | 1 | 1ª | 10th | Round of 32 |

| Season | Tier | Division | Place | Copa del Rey |
|---|---|---|---|---|
| 2011–12 | 1 | 1ª | 19th | Round of 32 |
| 2012–13 | 2 | 2ª | 10th | Round of 32 |
| 2013–14 | 2 | 2ª | 5th | Second round |
| 2014–15 | 2 | 2ª | 2nd | Second round |
| 2015–16 | 1 | 1ª | 17th | Round of 32 |
| 2016–17 | 1 | 1ª | 18th | Round of 32 |
| 2017–18 | 2 | 2ª | 4th | Third round |
| 2018–19 | 2 | 2ª | 9th | Round of 16 |
| 2019–20 | 2 | 2ª | 13th | First round |
| 2020–21 | 2 | 2ª | 7th | Round of 32 |
| 2021–22 | 2 | 2ª | 17th | Round of 16 |
| 2022–23 | 2 | 2ª | 17th | Round of 16 |
| 2023–24 | 2 | 2ª | 5th | Second round |
| 2024–25 | 2 | 2ª | 11th | Second round |
| 2025–26 | 2 | 2ª | 10th | Round of 32 |
| 2026–27 | 2 | 2ª | | TBD |

- 42 seasons in La Liga
- 54 seasons in Segunda División

== Sporting de Gijón in European football ==
Sporting de Gijón played six editions of the UEFA Cup, but only progressed from the first round in two.

| Season | Competition | Round | Opponent | Home | Away | Agg. |
|---|---|---|---|---|---|---|
| 1978–79 | UEFA Cup | R1 | (Italy) Torino | 3–0 | 0–1 | 3–1 |
| 1978–79 | UEFA Cup | R2 | (Socialist Federal Republic of Yugoslavia) Red Star Belgrade | 0–1 | 1–1 | 1–2 |
| 1979–80 | UEFA Cup | R1 | (Netherlands) PSV Eindhoven | 0–0 | 0–1 | 0–1 |
| 1980–81 | UEFA Cup | R1 | (Czechoslovakia) Bohemians | 2–1 | 1–3 | 3–4 |
| 1985–86 | UEFA Cup | R1 | (Germany) Köln | 1–2 | 0–0 | 1–2 |
| 1987–88 | UEFA Cup | R1 | (Italy) Milan | 1–0 | 0–3 | 1–3 |
| 1991–92 | UEFA Cup | R1 | (Socialist Federal Republic of Yugoslavia) Partizan | 2–0 | 0–2 | 2–2 |
| 1991–92 | UEFA Cup | R2 | (Romania) Steaua București | 2–2 | 0–1 | 2–3 |

== Players ==
=== Current squad ===
As of 1 September 2026

Note: Flags indicate national team as defined under FIFA eligibility rules; some limited exceptions apply. Players may hold more than one non-FIFA nationality.

| No. | Pos. | Nation | Player |
|---|---|---|---|
| 1 | GK | ESP | Rubén Yáñez |
| 2 | DF | ESP | Guille Rosas |
| 3 | DF | ESP | Pablo García |
| 4 | DF | URU | Emanuel Gularte (on loan from Puebla) |
| 5 | DF | ESP | Diego Sánchez |
| 6 | MF | ESP | Nacho Martín |
| 7 | MF | ESP | Gaspar Campos |
| 8 | MF | ESP | Manu Rodríguez |
| 9 | FW | URU | Andrés Ferrari (on loan from Sint-Truiden) |
| 10 | MF | ESP | César Gelabert |
| 11 | FW | USA | Konrad de la Fuente |
| 13 | GK | ESP | Egoitz Arana |

| No. | Pos. | Nation | Player |
|---|---|---|---|
| 14 | MF | ESP | Álex Corredera |
| 15 | DF | ESP | Pablo Vázquez |
| 16 | FW | ARG | Alejo Sarco |
| 17 | FW | ESP | Antonio Casas (on loan from Venezia) |
| 19 | FW | COL | Juan Otero |
| 20 | MF | RUS | Nikita Iosifov |
| 21 | MF | SEN | Mamadou Loum |
| 22 | MF | ESP | Hugo Guillamón |
| 23 | DF | ESP | Jorge Sáenz |
| 24 | DF | ESP | Aimar Duñabeitia |
| 26 | DF | ESP | Iker Martínez |
| 44 | DF | ESP | Andrés Cuenca (on loan from Como) |

=== Reserve team ===
Note: Flags indicate national team as defined under FIFA eligibility rules; some limited exceptions apply. Players may hold more than one non-FIFA nationality.

| No. | Pos. | Nation | Player |
|---|---|---|---|
| 27 | FW | ESP | Enol Prendes |
| 28 | FW | ESP | Miguel Conde |
| 29 | DF | ESP | Alex Diego |

| No. | Pos. | Nation | Player |
|---|---|---|---|
| 34 | MF | ESP | Diego Matabuena |
| 35 | MF | ESP | Chris Ferreres |
| 36 | MF | ESP | Bruno Rubio |

=== Out on loan ===
Note: Flags indicate national team as defined under FIFA eligibility rules; some limited exceptions apply. Players may hold more than one non-FIFA nationality.

| No. | Pos. | Nation | Player |
|---|---|---|---|
| — | DF | FRA | Yann Kembo (at Huesca until 30 June 2027) |
| — | FW | SEN | Amadou Coundoul (at Académica de Coimbra until 30 June 2027) |

== Personnel ==
=== Current technical staff ===
| Role | Name |
|---|---|
| Head coach | Nicolas Larcamon |
| Assistant coaches | (Spain) Pedro Hernández |
| Technical assistant | (Spain) Iván Cabezudo |
| Analysts | (Spain) Caco Morán (Spain) Carlos Hernández |
| Delegate | (Spain) Mario Cotelo |
| Goalkeeping coach | (Spain) Queco Piña |
| Fitness coaches | (Spain) Miguel Pérez |
| Chief doctor | (Spain) Antonio Maestro |
| Club doctors | (Mexico) Odín Vite |
| Physiotherapists | (Spain) César Castaño (Spain) Pablo del Fueyo (Spain) Pelayo Merediz |
| Masseur | (Spain) Diego Lobelle |
| Nutritionist | (Spain) Beatriz Manchón |
| Podologist | (Spain) Benjamín Arnáiz |
| Kit men | (Spain) Jorge Luis García (Spain) Pablo Caso |

== Direction and finances ==
=== Board of directors ===
| Role | Name |
|---|---|
| President | Alejandro Irarragorri |
| Executive president | José Riestra |
| Director of football | Gerardo García |
| Club ambassador | Joaquín Alonso |

=== Club budgets ===
| Season | Division | Budget (€) |
|---|---|---|
| 2013–14 | Segunda | 14,099,300.00 |
| 2014–15 | Segunda | 11,884,180.00 |
| 2015–16 | La Liga | 31,278,634.45 |
| 2016–17 | La Liga | 43,785,450.00 |
| 2017–18 | Segunda | 23,286,465.00 |
| 2018–19 | Segunda | 24,138,980.00 |
| 2019–20 | Segunda | 23,772,801.00 |
| 2020–21 | Segunda | 20,851,230.00 |
| 2021–22 | Segunda | 14,200,000.00 |
| 2022–23 | Segunda | 18,600,000.00 |
| 2023–24 | Segunda | 22,600,000.00 |
| 2024–25 | Segunda | 22,700,000.00 |
| 2025–26 | Segunda | 22,836,825.00 |

=== Presidents ===
==== Until 1992 ====
- Anselmo López Sánchez (1905–1915)
- Fernando Fernández Quirós Suárez (1905–1917)
- Manuel Ignacio González Rivera (1917–1919)
- Enrique Martínez (1919–1921)
- Ismael Figaredo Herrero (1921–1928)
- Roberto González de Anda(1928–1930)
- Pedro Portillo (1930–1934)
- Emilio García (1934–1935)
- Félix García (1935–1938)
- Pedro González del Río (1938–1940)
- Secundino Fernández (1940–1945)
- Juan Velasco (1945–1946)
- Jesús Fernández Hernández (1946–1947)
- José María Fernández Álvarez (1946–1947)
- Secundino Fernández (2) (1948–1949)
- Paulino Palacios (1949–1954)
- Joaquín Alonso Díaz (1954–1955)
- Eustaquio González (1955–1957)
- Alejandro Vidal (1957–1959)
- Ramón Gómez Lozano (1959–1960)
- Aurelio Menéndez González (1960–1961)
- Francisco Quirós Rodríguez (1961)
- Víctor Manuel Suarez Díaz (1967–1968)
- Antonio Ruiz (1967–1968)
- Carlos Méndez Cuevas (1968–1973)
- Ángel Vallejo (1973–1977)
- Manuel Vega-Arango Alvaré (1977–1986)
- Ramón Muñoz Fernández (1986–1989)
- Plácido Rodríguez Guerrero (1989–1992)

==== Since the conversion into SAD in 1992 ====
With Fernández family as owners

- Eloy Calvo Capellín (1992–1994)
- Manuel Calvo Pumpido (1994)
- José Fernández Álvarez (1994–1997)
- Ángel García Flórez (1997–1998)
- Germán Ojeda Gutiérrez (1998–1999)
- Juan Manuel Pérez Arango (1999–2002)
- Manuel Vega-Arango Alvaré (2) (2002–2013)
- Antonio Veiga Suárez (2013–2016)
- Javier Fernández Rodríguez (2016–2022)

With Orlegi Sports as owners

Presidents of the board of director
- Alejandro Carlos Irarragorri Gutiérrez (2022–present)
Executive presidents
- David Guerra Gómez (2022–2025)
- José Riestra López (2025–present)

== Women's team ==
The women's team of Sporting Gijón was founded in 1995 as EF Mareo and declared officially as a section of the club in 2016. It currently plays in the third division, called Segunda Federación.

== Sections ==
In other time, Sporting Gijón had sections of athletics, handball and rugby union.

== See also ==
- Sporting de Gijón B – Sporting de Gijón's farm team.
- Trofeo Villa de Gijón
