= 2019–20 Sporting de Gijón season =

Sporting de Gijón
2019–20 season
- President: Javier Fernández
- Head coach: Miroslav Đukić
- Stadium: El Molinón
- Segunda División: 13th
- Copa del Rey: First round
- Top goalscorer: Aitor García (7 goals)
- Highest home attendance: 22,072; Real Sporting 1–1 Racing Santander (22 September 2019)
- Lowest home attendance: 13,804; Real Sporting 1–0 Elche (14 January 2020)
- Average home league attendance: 17,515
Home colours	Away colours	Third colours

The 2019–20 Sporting de Gijón season was the club's 114th season in existence and the club's 48th season in the second tier of Spanish football, and the third year since its most recent relegation. It covered a period from 1 July 2019 to 20 July 2020, when the last league match was played.

== Season overview ==
=== Pre-season ===
The pre-season started with Roberto Canella leaving Real Sporting after 20 years and playing more than 300 games with the Rojiblancos.

The first signing of the season was midfielder Javi Fuego, who came back to the team after twelve years.

On successive days, other players with experience in the league like Unai Medina or Álvaro Vázquez and Argentine Damián Pérez joined the club. On 17 July 2019, after days of negotiations, Real Sporting signed Manu García from Manchester City. The Asturian midfielder came back to Gijón five years after leaving Mareo, and agreed to a five-year contract.

=== August ===
The season started with a 1–1 draw at Girona in a match where Real Sporting finished with 10 players after Damián Pérez was ejected. Aitor García scored in the 88th minute but just one minute later, Borja García made the equalizer for the Catalans.

One week later, Real Sporting nailed another draw, at home against Rayo Vallecano. Borja López netted his first goal with the Rojiblancos but Andrés scored in the second half of a match where the video assistant referee was heavily criticized as it excessively interrupted the match.

=== September ===
The first win of the season arrived in the third game, a 2–0 victory over Albacete after a good second half, with two Asturians netting their first goals with the club: Pedro Díaz and Manu García.

After this win, Real Sporting had their first loss at Huesca. In this match, Pedro Díaz was sent off, and the referee received many protests. In the next match, the team only got one point against Deportivo, in which the video assistant referee gave them a penalty kick in the additional time. José Alberto was criticized again for playing too defensively when the team was winning 1–0. Đurđević scored his first goal in this match, just two days after his contract extension until 2023.

The team was criticized during the rest of the month, as they earned two more points in the next three matches.

=== October ===
Despite starting the month with a huge win against Almería, criticism came back three days later, when the team was defeated at debutants Fuenlabrada by 2–0. The awful performance was worse in the next week, where Real Sporting lost its first home match. Alcorcón scored three goals in the first half and finished winning 1–3.

José Alberto was heavily criticized again, but the board of directors continued trusting in him. This trust signified the next week's win at Elche with a single goal of Manu García, who did not play the previous match as he was called up for the under-21 Spanish team. This was the first win out of El Molinón.

Finally, a routing 4–0 win against Zaragoza seemed to be a reaction for trying to come back to the top half of the table.

=== November ===
A 3–1 loss at Cádiz with a very controversial penalty kick was the start of another outrageous month for Real Sporting. José Alberto could only earn one more point before his possible dismissal. This point was at the Asturian derby against Oviedo, in a goalless match played without Manu García, called up again for the under-21 national team.

The 0–2 loss against Tenerife would not improve the things in Gijón. José Alberto tried to blame the VAR, that called for a penalty against the team with 0–0 in the scoreboard, but the performance did not improve and the team was very close to the relegation positions. However, finally Miguel Torrecilla, club's director of football ratified his job and the coach continued at least one more week at the helm.

=== December ===
In December, Uroš Đurđević won two consecutive matches against Ponferradina and Lugo, with three goals of the Serbian striker.

However, the criticism to the performance despite the wins and a 2–1 defeat against fourth-tier team Zamora in the Copa del Rey stained the team's reaction. This was the first loss of Real Sporting against a Tercera División team ever.

Finally, 2019 ended with José Alberto being sacked after a new home loss against Extremadura, with an own goal of Carlos Crdero. Serbian manager Miroslav Đukić was hired the following day.

=== January ===
Đukić's was going to be on 3 January at Zaragoza. However, the match was postponed four days to the flu of eleven players. It finally ended with a 0–2 loss, starting with a goal against at the second minute of the match.

The next match would go better, as Real Sporting beat Elche with a lonely goal of Manu García in the 87th minute. This match was Đukić's debut at El Molinón and, despite winning, the new coach recognized the team must improve its football.

On 30 January 2020, Real Sporting announced the loan of Isma Cerro to Badajoz until the end of the season and one day later, Neftali Manzambi to Valencia Mestalla. The club only added one player to the squad: Murilo Costa, loaned from Portuguese club Braga.

=== February and March ===
After the 2–2 home draw against Copa del Rey semifinalist Mirandés, Đukić stated that staying only three points over the relegation positions, the objective of the season can't be other than avoiding relegation.

However, the team responded to this situation by winning the two next matches: the first one at El Sardinero, in a sold-out match with 3,000 people from Gijón, where Murilo scored his first goal and helped to beat Racing Santander 2–0, and the second one against leaders Cádiz, with the supporters agreeing the team had improved since the last bad streak.

After a loss at Ponferradina, the last match played by Real Sporting before the suspension of the league due to the coronavirus pandemic was a wide 4–0 win against Las Palmas.

=== Recommence ===
On 4 May, Real Sporting announced that Miguel Torrecilla would leave the club on 30 June and hired Javi Rico as new director of football.

After all players being tested of COVID-19 on 7 May, players will face their first training on 11 May.

Real Sporting played its first match after the suspension at Estadio Riazor, A Coruña, and only earned one point after a goalless draw against Deportivo La Coruña.

The first match at home was the Asturian derby, that Real Sporting lost 0–1 against Oviedo.

Real Sporting finished the season in the 13th position, equalising the club's worst classification ever.

== Players ==
=== Current squad ===
N	Pos.	Nat.	Name	Age	Since	App	Goals	Ends	Transfer fee	Notes
2	DF	(Argentina)	Damián Pérez	31	2019	0	0	2021	Free	
3	DF	(Spain)	Carlos Cordero	29	2019	12	0	2021	Youth system	
4	DF	(Spain)	Marc Valiente	33	2019	0	0	2021	Free	
5	DF	(Spain)	Borja López	26	2019	19	0	2022	Undisclosed	
6	DF	(Martinique)	Jean-Sylvain Babin	33	2016	56	4	2022	Free	Played internationally with Martinique.
7	MF	(Spain)	Aitor García	32	2019	11	1	2023	€1m	
8	MF	(Spain)	Hernán Santana	29	2018	24	2	2021	Free	
9	FW	(Spain)	Álvaro Vázquez	29	2019	0	0	2022	Free	
10	MF	(Spain)	Carlos Carmona	33	2012	227	41	2021	Free	
11	MF	(Brazil)	Murilo	31	2020	0	0	2020	Free	
13	GK	(Spain)	Diego Mariño	30	2016	81	0	2023	Undisclosed	
14	MF	(Spain)	Nacho Méndez	22	2018	42	2	2021	Youth system	
15	DF	(Spain)	Francisco Molinero	34	2018	27	0	2020	Free	
16	MF	(Spain)	Manu García	22	2019	0	0	2024	€4m	
17	DF	(Spain)	Unai Medina	30	2019	0	0	2021	Free	
18	MF	(Spain)	Javi Fuego	36	2019	114	4	2021	Free	
20	MF	(Spain)	Cristian Salvador	31	2018	30	1	2021	Youth system	
21	MF	(Spain)	Álvaro Traver	33	2018	25	1	2021	Youth system	
22	MF	(Spain)	Pablo Pérez	26	2017	106	9	2022	Youth system	
23	FW	(Serbia)	Uroš Đurđević	32	2018	38	11	2023	€2m	
24	DF	(Spain)	Pedro Díaz	28	2019	3	0	2022	Youth system	

- Source: Stats updated as of the end of the 2018–19 season. Only league games included. Ages as of the end of the 2019–20 season.
- Ordered by squad number.

=== Reserve team ===
Note: Flags indicate national team as defined under FIFA eligibility rules; some limited exceptions apply. Players may hold more than one non-FIFA nationality.

No.	Pos.	Nation	Player
27	DF	ESP	Berto Espeso
28	MF	ESP	Berto
29	MF	ESP	José Gragera
30	GK	CUB	Christian Joel
33	GK	ESP	Javi Benítez
34	DF	ESP	Isma Aizpiri

No.	Pos.	Nation	Player
35	MF	ESP	César García
36	FW	ESP	Garci
37	DF	UKR	Bogdan Milovanov
38	DF	ESP	Gaspar Campos
39	DF	ESP	Guillermo Rosas

=== In ===
No.	Pos.	Nat.	Name	Age	Moving from	Type	Transfer window	Ends	Transfer fee	Source
	MF	(Spain)	Moi Gómez	25	Huesca	End of loan	Summer	2020	Free	
	FW	(Switzerland)	Neftali Manzambi	22	Córdoba	End of loan	Summer	2022	Free	
	DF	(Spain)	Carlos Cordero	22	Real Sporting B	Promoted	Summer	2021	Free	
	DF	(Spain)	Pedro Díaz	21	Real Sporting B	Promoted	Summer	2022	Free	
	MF	(Spain)	Javi Fuego	35	Villarreal	Transfer	Summer	2021	Free	
	DF	(Spain)	Unai Medina	29	Numancia	Transfer	Summer	2021	Free	
	DF	(Spain)	Álvaro Vázquez	28	Zaragoza	Transfer	Summer	2022	Free	
	DF	(Argentina)	Damián Pérez	30	(Argentina) San Lorenzo	Transfer	Summer	2021	Free	
	MF	(Spain)	Manu García	21	(England) Manchester City (Note: Previously loaned to Toulouse.)	Transfer	Summer	2024	€4m	
	DF	(Spain)	Marc Valiente	32	(Serbia) Partizan	Transfer	Summer	2021	Undisclosed	
	DF	(Spain)	Borja López	25	(Croatia) Hajduk Split	Transfer	Summer	2022	Undisclosed	
	MF	(Brazil)	Murilo	25	(Portugal) Braga	Loan	Winter	2020	Free	

=== Out ===
No.	Pos.	Nat.	Name	Age	Moving to	Type	Transfer window	Transfer fee	Source
3	DF	(Spain)	Javi Noblejas	26	(Netherlands) NAC Breda	End of contract	Summer	Free	
9	FW	(England)	Nick Blackman	29	(England) Derby County (Note: Later transferred to Maccabi Tel Aviv.)	End of loan	Summer	Free	
11	FW	(Spain)	Ivi	25	Levante (Note: Later loaned to Huesca.)	End of loan	Summer	Free	
12	MF	(Spain)	Álvaro	24	Getafe (Note: Later transferred to Albacete.)	End of loan	Summer	Free	
15	FW	(Spain)	Roberto Canella	31	Lugo	End of contract	Summer	Free	
16	MF	(Portugal)	André Sousa	28	(Portugal) Belenenses SAD	End of loan	Summer	Free	
18	DF	(Portugal)	André Geraldes	28	(Portugal) Sporting CP (Note: Later loaned to Maccabi Tel Aviv.)	End of loan	Summer	Free	
19	DF	(France)	Mathieu Peybernes	28	(France) Lorient (Note: Later transferred to Almería.)	End of loan	Summer	Free	
24	DF	(Spain)	Álex Pérez	27	(Germany) Arminia Bielefeld	End of contract	Summer	Free	
25	FW	(Spain)	Álex Alegría	26	Real Betis (Note: Later transferred to Mallorca.)	End of loan	Summer	Free	
17	MF	(Finland)	Robin Lod	26	(United States) Minnesota United	Transfer	Summer	€600k	
5	MF	(Ghana)	Isaac Cofie	27	(Turkey) Sivasspor	Transfer	Summer	Undisclosed	
1	GK	(Spain)	Dani Martín	21	Real Betis	Transfer	Summer	€5m	
	MF	(Spain)	Moi Gómez	25	Villarreal	Transfer	Summer	€1.5m	
4	DF	(Spain)	Juan Rodríguez	24	Gimnàstic	Transfer	Summer	Free	
11	FW	(Spain)	Isma Cerro	24	Badajoz	Loan	Winter	Free	
19	FW	(Switzerland)	Neftali Manzambi	22	Valencia Mestalla	Loan	Winter	Free	

=== Technical staff ===
Position	Staff
Manager	(Serbia) Miroslav Đukić
Assistant manager	(Serbia) Goran Pandurović
Goalkeeping Coach	(Spain) Jorge Sariego
Physical trainer	(Spain) Fran Albert
Delegate	(Spain) Mario Cotelo
Director of Football	(Spain) Javi Rico
Academy Director	(Spain) Manolo Sánchez Murias

Source: Real Sporting

==== Managerial changes ====
Outgoing manager	Manner of departure	Date of vacancy	Position in table	Replaced by	Date of appointment
(Spain) José Alberto	Sacked	21 December 2018	15th	(Serbia) Miroslav Đukić	22 December 2019

== Pre-season and friendlies ==
17 July 2019 Friendly	Real Sporting	9–0	Gijón Industrial	Gijón
19:00	Álvaro Vázquez 5'; Nacho Méndez 12'; Đurđević 46', 83'; Berto 61', 73', 77'; Pablo Pérez 78'; Aitor García 90'	Report		Stadium: Pepe Ortiz; Referee: Álvarez Jiménez

20 July 2019 Friendly	Lealtad	0–4	Real Sporting	Villaviciosa
19:15		Report	Aitor García 5', 38'; Pedro Díaz 60'; Pablo Pérez 90'	Stadium: Les Caleyes; Referee: Blanco Rodríguez

24 July 2019 Friendly	Real Sporting	1–1	Langreo	Gijón
	Pelayo Suárez 34'	Report	David Álvarez 32'	Stadium: Pepe Ortiz; Referee: Quirós Pérez

27 July 2019 Friendly	Getafe	1–1	Real Sporting	Villares de la Reina
20:00	Cucurella 87'	Report	Đurđević 67'	Stadium: Helmántico; Referee: González González

30 July 2019 Friendly	Nantes	2–0	Real Sporting	La Baule-Escoublac
20:00	A. Touré 19' (pen.); Louza 75'	Report		Stadium: Moreau Desfarge; Referee: Ben El Hadj

3 August 2019 Friendly	Marino Luanco	1–1	Real Sporting	Luanco, Gozón
	Iván 20'	Report	Javi Fuego 87'	Stadium: Miramar; Referee: González Suárez

8 August 2019 Friendly	Valladolid	2–0	Real Sporting	Palencia
	Enes Ünal 47'; Waldo 65'	Report		Stadium: Nueva Balastera; Referee: Diego Calvo

10 August 2019 Friendly	Real Sporting	0–0	Alavés	Avilés
		Report		Stadium: Román Suárez Puerta; Referee: García Riesgo

== Competitions ==
=== Segunda División ===
==== League table ====
Pos	Team	Pld	W	D	L	GF	GA	GD	Pts
11	Mirandés	42	13	17	12	55	59	−4	56
12	Tenerife	42	14	13	15	50	46	+4	55
13	Sporting Gijón	42	14	12	16	40	38	+2	54
14	Málaga	42	11	20	11	35	33	+2	53 (Note: Málaga finished ahead of Oviedo on head-to-head points: Málaga 2–1 Oviedo, Oviedo 1–1 Málaga.)
15	Oviedo	42	13	14	15	49	53	−4	53

Source: LaLiga Soccerway
Rules for classification: 1) points; 2) head-to-head points; 3) head-to-head goal difference; 4) goal difference; 5) number of goals scored

==== Results summary ====
Overall								Home						Away					
Pld	W	D	L	GF	GA	GD	Pts	W	D	L	GF	GA	GD	W	D	L	GF	GA	GD
42	14	12	16	40	38	+2	54	10	5	6	28	17	+11	4	7	10	12	21	−9

==== Positions by round ====
Round	1	2	3	4	5	6	7	8	9	10	11	12	13	14	15	16	17	18	19	20	21	22	23	24	25	26	27	28	29	30	31	32	33	34	35	36	37	38	39	40	41	42
Ground	A	H	H	A	H	A	H	A	H	A	H	A	H	A	H	A	H	A	H	A	H	A	H	A	H	A	H	A	H	A	H	A	A	H	A	H	A	H	A	H	A	H
Result	D	D	W	L	D	L	D	D	W	L	L	W	W	L	L	D	L	D	W	W	L	L	W	L	W	L	D	W	W	L	W	D	W	L	D	W	L	D	D	W	L	L
Position	11	13	8	10	13	15	15	15	13	15	16	14	11	14	16	16	17	16	15	14	15	15	14	14	14	14	16	14	11	15	8	11	9	11	12	10	11	11	12	10	11	13

Source: BDFútbol
A = Away; H = Home; W = Win; D = Draw; L = Loss

==== Matches ====
18 August 2019 1	Girona	1–1	Real Sporting	Girona
18:30	Pedro Alcalá (yellow card) 37'; Miquel (yellow card) 65'; Borja García 90'	Report	Carmona (yellow card) 3'; Damián Pérez (red card) 58'; Aitor García 89'	Stadium: Montilivi; Attendance: 8,156; Referee: Trujillo Suárez

25 August 2019 2	Real Sporting	1–1	Rayo Vallecano	Gijón
18:00	Molinero (yellow card) 7'; Borja López 29'; Nacho Méndez (yellow card) 37' (yellow-red card) 58'; Manzambi (yellow card) 88'; Javi Fuego (yellow card) 93'	Report	Pozo (yellow card) 28'; Trejo (yellow card) 38'; Andrés 52'; Catena (yellow card) 67'; Mario Suárez (yellow card) 71'; Tito (red card) 85'; Embarba (yellow card) 92'	Stadium: El Molinón; Attendance: 21,494; Referee: Vicandi Garrido

1 September 2019 3	Real Sporting	2–0	Albacete	Gijón
18:00	Borja López (yellow card) 17'; Pedro Díaz 56'; Đurđević (yellow card) 70'; Manu García 75'	Report	Olabe (yellow card) 65'; Azamoum (yellow card) 79'; Zozulya (yellow card) 90'	Stadium: El Molinón; Attendance: 19,590; Referee: Ocón Arraiz

8 September 2019 4	Huesca	1–0	Real Sporting	Huesca
12:00	Raba (yellow card) 28' (goal) 49'; Eugeni (yellow card) 53'; Ivi (yellow card) 89'	Report	Pedro Díaz (yellow card) 35' (yellow-red card) 59'; Manu García (yellow card) 57'	Stadium: El Alcoraz; Attendance: 6,438; Referee: López Toca

15 September 2019 5	Real Sporting	1–1	Deportivo La Coruña	Gijón
21:00	Đurđević 5'; Carmona (yellow card) 18'; Damián Pérez (yellow card) 66'; Javi Fuego (yellow card) 88'; Borja López (yellow card) 94'	Report	Eneko Bóveda (yellow card) 8'; Vicente Gómez (yellow card) 19'; Lampropoulos (yellow card) 68'; Montero (yellow card) 72'; Aketxe 95' (pen.)	Stadium: El Molinón; Attendance: 18,201; Referee: Pulido Santana

19 September 2019 6	Las Palmas	1–0	Real Sporting	Las Palmas
22:00	De la Bella (yellow card) 57'; Pedri 61'; Drolé (yellow card) 67'; Lemos (yellow card) 76'; Ruiz de Galarreta (yellow card) 79'	Report	Babin (yellow card) 9'; Nacho Méndez (yellow card) 12'; Carmona (yellow card) 64'; Manu García (yellow card) 68'; Marc Valiente (yellow card) 72'	Stadium: Gran Canaria; Attendance: 7,699; Referee: De la Fuente Ramos

22 September 2019 5	Real Sporting	1–1	Racing Santander	Gijón
18:00	Salvador (yellow card) 19'; Nacho Méndez 40' (yellow card) 72'; Molinero (yellow card) 68'; Aitor García (yellow card) 92'; Borja López (yellow card) 94'	Report	Figueras (yellow card) 21'; Alexis (yellow card) 52'; Yoda 70'	Stadium: El Molinón; Attendance: 22,072; Referee: Gorostegui Fernández-Ortega

29 September 2019 8	Málaga	0–0	Real Sporting	Málaga
12:00	Bare (yellow card) 87'; Luis Muñoz (yellow card) 91'	Report	Nacho Méndez (yellow card) 26'	Stadium: La Rosaleda; Attendance: 15,272; Referee: Arcediano Monescillo

3 October 2019 9	Real Sporting	4–2	Almería	Gijón
19:00	Marc Valiente 7'; Babin 14'; Aitor García 39', 45'; Đurđević (yellow card) 91'	Report	Petrović 23' (yellow card) 35'; De la Hoz (yellow card) 41'; Jonathan (yellow card) 54'; Maraš 67'; Martos (yellow card) 71'	Stadium: El Molinón; Attendance: 16,310; Referee: Moreno Aragón

6 October 2019 10	Fuenlabrada	2–0	Real Sporting	Fuenlabrada
12:00	Juanma (yellow card) 43'; Cristóbal 59'; Hugo Fraile (yellow card) 73'; José Fran 77' (pen.); Nteka (yellow card) 94'	Report	Marc Valiente (yellow card) 19'; Damián Pérez (yellow card) 47'; Salvador (yellow card) 49'; Manu García 67'; Babin (yellow card) 75'; Carmona (yellow card) 95'	Stadium: Fernando Torres; Attendance: 5,345; Referee: Díaz de Mera Escuderos

12 October 2019 11	Real Sporting	1–3	Alcorcón	Gijón
16:00	Nacho Méndez (yellow card) 63'; Babin (yellow card) 64'; Damián Pérez (yellow card) 80'; Borja López (yellow card) 86'; Đurđević 91' (yellow card) 91'	Report	Arribas (yellow card) 16' (goal) 19'; Stoichkov 23'; Boateng 40'; Ernesto (yellow card) 80'	Stadium: El Molinón; Attendance: 17,301; Referee: Javier Iglesias Villanueva

19 October 2019 12	Elche	0–1	Real Sporting	Elche
18:00	Villar (yellow card) 39'; Manu Sánchez (yellow card) 72'	Report	Manu García 27' (yellow card) 72'; Marc Valiente (yellow card) 35'; Salvador (yellow card) 63'; Molinero (yellow card) 76'; Pablo Pérez (yellow card) 77'	Stadium: Manuel Martínez Valero; Attendance: 9,374; Referee: Ortiz Arias

27 October 2019 13	Real Sporting	4–0	Zaragoza	Gijón
16:00	Isma Cerro 3'; Aitor García 38', 76'; Álvaro Vázquez 87'	Report	Grippo (yellow card) 19' (yellow-red card) 30'	Stadium: El Molinón; Attendance: 19,204; Referee: Figueroa Vázquez

1 November 2019 14	Cádiz	3–1	Real Sporting	Cádiz
16:00	Marcos Mauro 33'; Edu Ramos (yellow card) 44'; Álex Fernández 61', 78' (pen.); Fali (yellow card) 65'; José Mari (yellow card) 86'	Report	Đurđević (yellow card) 4'; Mariño (yellow card) 49'; Aitor García (yellow card) 50'; Valiente (yellow card) 52'; Borja López 63'	Stadium: Ramón de Carranza; Attendance: 17,297; Referee: Sagués Oscoz

9 November 2019 15	Real Sporting	0–1	Numancia	Gijón
18:00	Molinero (yellow card) 83'; Manu García (yellow card) 87'	Report	Higinio 27'; Noguera (yellow card) 38'; Curro (yellow card) 40'; Álex Sola (yellow card) 80'	Stadium: El Molinón; Attendance: 14,868; Referee: Muñiz Ruiz

17 November 2019 16	Oviedo	0–0	Real Sporting	Oviedo
16:00	Ortuño (yellow card) 25'; Tejera (yellow card) 41'; Lolo (yellow card) 70'	Report	Pablo Pérez (yellow card) 18'; Molinero (yellow card) 37'; Nacho Méndez (yellow card) 54'; Javi Fuego (yellow card) 65'	Stadium: Carlos Tartiere; Attendance: 20,448; Referee: Gorostegui Fernández-Ortega

22 November 2019 17	Real Sporting	0–2	Tenerife	Gijón
21:00	Pedro Díaz (yellow card) 47'; Marc Valiente (yellow card) 47' (yellow-red card) 55'; Salvador (yellow card) 56'; Đurđević (yellow card) 58'; Javi Fuego (yellow card) 64'; Aitor García (yellow card) 79'; Álvaro Vázquez (yellow card) 88'; Unai Medina (yellow card) 94'	Report	Álex Muñoz (yellow card) 45'; Borja Lasso (yellow card) 49'; Suso 57' (pen.); Carlos Ruiz (yellow card) 66'; Dani Gómez (yellow card) 70'	Stadium: El Molinón; Attendance: 14,173; Referee: Ávalos Barrera

30 November 2019 18	Mirandés	0–0	Real Sporting	Miranda de Ebro
16:00	Antonio Sánchez (yellow card) 31'; Malsa (yellow card) 57'	Report	Molinero (yellow card) 92'	Stadium: Anduva; Attendance: 3,682; Referee: Milla Alvéndiz

6 December 2019 19	Real Sporting	1–0	Ponferradina	Gijón
18:00	Damián Pérez (yellow card) 74'; Đurđević 75'; Javi Fuego (yellow card) 87'	Report	Trigueros (yellow card) 18'; Manzanara (yellow card) 18' (yellow-red card) 89'; Sielva (yellow card) 60'	Stadium: El Molinón; Attendance: 18,166; Referee: Isidro Díaz de Mera Escuderos

15 December 2019 20	Lugo	1–2	Real Sporting	Lugo
18:00	Herrera (yellow card) 22' (goal) 63'; Canella (yellow card) 77'; Gerard (red card) 93'	Report	Đurđević 36', 87'; Damián Pérez (yellow card) 46'; Cordero (yellow card) 53'; Javi Fuego (yellow card) 64'	Stadium: Anxo Carro; Attendance: 4,214; Referee: Figueroa Vázquez

21 December 2019 21	Real Sporting	0–1	Extremadura	Gijón
18:00	Bain (yellow card) 41'; Đurđević (yellow card) 89'	Report	David Rocha (yellow card) 65'; Cordero 78' (o.g.)	Stadium: El Molinón; Attendance: 14,840; Referee: Trujillo Suárez

7 January 2020 22	Zaragoza	2–0	Real Sporting	Zaragoza
21:00	Guti 2'; Luis Suárez 59'; Igbekene (yellow card) 78'; Javi Ros (yellow card) 87'	Report	Cordero (yellow card) 27'; Isma Cerro (yellow card) 76'; Molinero (red card) 91'	Stadium: La Romareda; Attendance: 15,478; Referee: Moreno Aragón

14 January 2020 23	Real Sporting	1–0	Elche	Gijón
19:00	Đurđević (yellow card) 80'; Aitor García (yellow card) 84'; Manu García 86'	Report	Óscar (yellow card) 52'; Ramón Folch (yellow card) 82'	Stadium: El Molinón; Attendance: 13,804; Referee: González Esteban

18 January 2020 24	Numancia	2–0	Real Sporting	Soria
16:00	Higinio 13'; Curro 82'; Escassi (yellow card) 87'	Report	Đurđević (yellow card) 16'; Bogdan (yellow card) 62'; Javi Fuego (yellow card) 90'	Stadium: Los Pajaritos; Attendance: 3,212; Referee: Ocón Arraiz

25 January 2020 25	Real Sporting	1–0	Fuenlabrada	Gijón
16:00	Pedro Díaz 26' (yellow card) 70'; Đurđević (yellow card) 46'; Damián Pérez (yellow card) 72'; Pablo Pérez (yellow card) 87'	Report	Iban Salvador (yellow card) 68'; Iribas (yellow card) 81'	Stadium: El Molinón; Attendance: 15,687; Referee: Galech Apezteguía

31 January 2020 26	Tenerife	2–1	Real Sporting	Santa Cruz de Tenerife
21:00	Šipčić 8'; Joselu 46'	Report	Manu García (yellow card) 60'; Pablo Pérez 82'	Stadium: Heliodoro Rodríguez López; Attendance: 9,990; Referee: Arcediano Monescillo

9 February 2020 27	Real Sporting	2–2	Mirandés	Gijón
16:00	Carmona 7'; Pedro Díaz (yellow card) 29' (goal) 79'	Report	Malsa (yellow card) 9'; Marcos André 13' (pen.); Guridi (yellow card) 42'; Joaquín 74'	Stadium: El Molinón; Attendance: 18,439; Referee: José Antonio López Toca

16 February 2020 28	Racing Santander	0–2	Real Sporting	Santander
18:15	Olaortua (yellow card) 86'	Report	Bogdan (yellow card) 11'; Murilo 40'; Molinero (yellow card) 70'; Damián Pérez (yellow card) 83'; Carmona 89' (pen.)	Stadium: El Sardinero; Attendance: 20,158; Referee: Ortiz Arias

21 February 2020 29	Real Sporting	1–0	Cádiz	Gijón
21:00	Bogdan (yellow card) 40'; Álvaro Vázquez 54'; Javi Fuego (yellow card) 76'	Report	Cala (yellow card) 29'; Iza (yellow card) 51'; Fali (yellow card) 62'; José Mari (red card) 64'; Álex (yellow card) 74'; Jurado (yellow card) 76'	Stadium: El Molinón; Attendance: 17,625; Referee: Trujillo Suárez

29 February 2020 30	Ponferradina	1–0	Real Sporting	Ponferrada
16:00	Kaxe 17'; Ivi (yellow card) 77'; René (yellow card) 92'	Report	Salvador (yellow card) 55'; Pablo Pérez (yellow card) 89'	Stadium: El Toralín; Attendance: 7,395; Referee: Ocón Arraiz

8 March 2020 31	Real Sporting	4–0	Las Palmas	Gijón
18:15	Damián (yellow card) 1'; Álvaro Vázquez 46'; Babin 49'; Murilo 73'; Nacho Méndez 85'	Report	Lemos (yellow card) 10' (red card) 92'	Stadium: El Molinón; Attendance: 18,610; Referee: De la Fuente Ramos

14 July 2020 32	Deportivo La Coruña	0–0	Real Sporting	A Coruña
17:00	Montero (yellow card) 49'	Report		Stadium: Riazor; Attendance: 0 Referee: Ais Reig

18 July 2020 33	Alcorcón	0–2	Real Sporting	Alcorcón
21:30	Romera (yellow card) 70'; Reko (yellow card) 90'	Report	Luis Perea 18' (o.g.); Đurđević 20'; Javi Fuego (yellow card) 59'; Salvador (yellow card) 63'	Stadium: Santo Domingo; Attendance: 0 Referee: Ávalos Barrera

22 June 2020 34	Real Sporting	0–1	Oviedo	Gijón
21:45	Molinero (yellow card) 54'; Pablo Pérez (yellow card) 90+2'	Report	Tejera (yellow card) 37'; Borja Sánchez 70'	Stadium: El Molinón; Attendance: 0 Referee: Figueroa Vázquez

25 June 2020 35	Rayo Vallecano	1–1	Real Sporting	Madrid
19:30	Qasmi 76'; Juan Villar (yellow card) 85'; Dimitrievski (yellow card) 90+4'	Report	Medina (yellow card) 19'; Álvaro Vázquez 45+3' (yellow card) 77'; Salvador (yellow card) 60'	Stadium: Vallecas; Attendance: 0 Referee: Milla Alvendiz

28 June 2020 36	Real Sporting	2–0	Lugo	Gijón
17:00	Nacho Méndez 24'; Damián Pérez (yellow card) 57'; Aitor García 72'; Molinero (yellow card) 88'	Report		Stadium: El Molinón; Attendance: 0 Referee: Ocón Arraiz

1 July 2020 37	Almería	1–0	Real Sporting	Almería
19:30	De la Hoz 90'	Report	Aitor García (yellow card) 59'; Borja López (yellow card) 68'; Salvador (yellow card) 75'	Stadium: Mediterráneo; Attendance: 0 Referee: López Toca

6 July 2020 38	Real Sporting	0–0	Girona	Gijón
19:30	Javi Fuego (yellow card) 26'; Marc Valiente (yellow card) 46'	Report		Stadium: El Molinón; Attendance: 0 Referee: Gorostegui Fernández-Ortega

9 July 2020 39	Albacete	1–1	Real Sporting	Albacete
19:30	Pedro (yellow card) 12'; Dani Ojeda (yellow card) 28'; Barri (yellow card) 42'; Zozulya 69' (yellow card) 80'	Report	Pedro Díaz (yellow card) 3'; Aitor García 22' (yellow card) 54' (yellow-red card) 88'; Salvador (yellow card) 76'	Stadium: Carlos Belmonte; Attendance: 0 Referee: Trujillo Suárez

13 July 2020 40	Real Sporting	2–1	Málaga	Gijón
19:30	Unai Medina 4'; Álvaro Vázquez 31'; Nacho Méndez (yellow card) 53'; Javi Fuego (yellow card) 57'	Report	Keidi Bare (yellow card) 77' (goal) 90+3'	Stadium: El Molinón; Attendance: 0 Referee: Díaz de Mera Escuderos

17 July 2020 41	Extremadura	2–0	Real Sporting	Almendralejo
21:00	Carrasco 33'; Pinchi 42'; Cristian (yellow card) 90+4'	Report	Marc Valiente (yellow card) 12'; Javi Fuego (yellow card) 72'; Babin (yellow card) 83'; Gaspar (yellow card) 90+4'; Damián Pérez (yellow card) 90+4'	Stadium: Francisco de la Hera; Attendance: 0 Referee: Galech Apezteguía

20 July 2020 42	Real Sporting	0–1	Huesca	Gijón
21:00	Gragera (yellow card) 52'; Gaspar (yellow card) 72'	Report	Rafa Mir (yellow card) 50'; Cristo 73'; Javi Galán (yellow card) 84'	Stadium: El Molinón; Attendance: 0 Referee: Sagués Oscoz

=== Copa del Rey ===
17 December 2019 First round	Zamora (4)	2–1	Real Sporting (2)	Zamora
20:30	Garba (yellow card) 14'; Sergio García (yellow card) 25' (goal) 36' (pen.), 82'; Coque (yellow card) 67'		Berto (yellow card) 25'; Salvador (yellow card) 34'; Pablo Pérez (yellow card) 44'	Stadium: Ruta de la Plata; Attendance: 2,000; Referee: Muñiz Ruiz

== Statistics ==
=== Appearances and goals ===
No.	Pos	Nat	Player	Total		La Liga		Copa del Rey	
No.	Pos	Nat	Player	Apps	Goals	Apps	Goals	Apps	Goals
2	DF	(Argentina) ARG	Damián Pérez	30	0	29+0	0	1+0	0
3	DF	(Spain) ESP	Carlos Cordero	14	0	13+1	0	0+0	0
4	DF	(Spain) ESP	Marc Valiente	22	1	22+0	1	0+0	0
5	DF	(Spain) ESP	Borja López	13	2	9+3	2	1+0	0
6	DF	(Martinique) MTQ	Jean-Sylvain Babin	36	2	35+1	2	0+0	0
7	MF	(Spain) ESP	Aitor García	34	7	24+10	7	0+0	0
8	MF	(Spain) ESP	Hernán Santana	3	0	0+2	0	1+0	0
9	FW	(Spain) ESP	Álvaro Vázquez	38	5	17+20	5	1+0	0
10	MF	(Spain) ESP	Carlos Carmona	34	2	25+8	2	1+0	0
11	MF	(Brazil) BRA	Murilo	16	2	12+4	2	0+0	0
13	GK	(Spain) ESP	Diego Mariño	42	0	42+0	0	0+0	0
14	MF	(Spain) ESP	Nacho Méndez	41	3	28+12	3	1+0	0
15	DF	(Spain) ESP	Francisco Molinero	33	0	32+1	0	0+0	0
16	DF	(Spain) ESP	Manu García	43	3	40+3	3	0+0	0
17	DF	(Spain) ESP	Unai Medina	42	1	36+5	1	1+0	0
18	DF	(Spain) ESP	Javi Fuego	34	0	27+7	0	0+0	0
20	MF	(Spain) ESP	Cristian Salvador	30	0	20+9	0	1+0	0
21	MF	(Spain) ESP	Álvaro Traver	13	0	6+7	0	0+0	0
22	MF	(Spain) ESP	Pablo Pérez	27	1	9+17	1	1+0	0
23	FW	(Serbia) SRB	Uroš Đurđević	37	6	27+10	6	0+0	0
24	MF	(Spain) ESP	Pedro Díaz	28	3	24+4	3	0+0	0
27	DF	(Spain) ESP	Berto Espeso	0	0	0+0	0	0+0	0
28	MF	(Spain) ESP	Berto	5	0	0+4	0	1+0	0
29	MF	(Spain) ESP	José Gragera	4	0	2+2	0	0+0	0
30	GK	(Cuba) CUB	Christian Joel	1	0	0+0	0	1+0	0
33	GK	(Spain) ESP	Javi Benítez	0	0	0+0	0	0+0	0
34	DF	(Spain) ESP	Isma Aizpiri	0	0	0+0	0	0+0	0
35	MF	(Spain) ESP	César García	1	0	0+0	0	0+1	0
36	FW	(Spain) ESP	Garci	0	0	0+0	0	0+0	0
37	DF	(Ukraine) UKR	Bogdan Milovanov	9	0	8+1	0	0+0	0
38	MF	(Spain) ESP	Gaspar Campos	5	0	2+3	0	0+0	0
39	DF	(Spain) ESP	Guille Rosas	0	0	0+0	0	0+0	0
Players who have left the club after the start of the season:
11	FW	(Spain) ESP	Isma Cerro	9	2	4+4	1	0+1	1
19	FW	(Switzerland) SUI	Neftali Manzambi	3	0	0+2	0	0+1	0

- Source: BDFútbol

=== Disciplinary record ===
N	P	Nat.	Name	Segunda División			Copa del Rey			Total			Notes
N	P	Nat.	Name	Yellow card	Second yellow card	Red card	Yellow card	Second yellow card	Red card	Yellow card	Second yellow card	Red card	Notes
2	DF	(Argentina)	Damián Pérez	8		1				8		1	
3	DF	(Spain)	Carlos Cordero	2						2			
4	DF	(Spain)	Marc Valiente	5	1					5	1		
5	DF	(Spain)	Borja López	4						4			
6	DF	(Martinique)	Jean-Sylvain Babin	4						4			7 times captain
7	MF	(Spain)	Aitor García	4						4			
8	MF	(Spain)	Hernán Santana										
9	FW	(Spain)	Álvaro Vázquez	1						1			
10	MF	(Spain)	Carlos Carmona	5						5			22 times captain
11	MF	(Brazil)	Murilo										
13	GK	(Spain)	Diego Mariño	1						1			
14	MF	(Spain)	Nacho Méndez	6	1					6	1		
15	DF	(Spain)	Francisco Molinero	7		1				7		1	2 times captain
16	DF	(Spain)	Manu García	6						6			
17	DF	(Spain)	Unai Medina	1						1			
18	DF	(Spain)	Javi Fuego	9						9			
20	MF	(Spain)	Cristian Salvador	6			1			7			
21	MF	(Spain)	Álvaro Traver										
22	MF	(Spain)	Pablo Pérez	4			1			5			3 times captain
23	FW	(Serbia)	Uroš Đurđević	9						9			
24	MF	(Spain)	Pedro Díaz	4	1					4	1		
27	DF	(Spain)	Berto Espeso										
28	MF	(Spain)	Berto				1			1			
29	MF	(Spain)	José Gragera										
30	GK	(Cuba)	Christian Joel										
33	GK	(Spain)	Javi Benítez										
34	DF	(Spain)	Isma Aizpiri										
35	MF	(Spain)	César García										
36	FW	(Spain)	Garci										
37	DF	(Ukraine)	Bogdan Milovanov	3						3			
38	DF	(Spain)	Gaspar Campos										
Players who have left the club after the start of the season:
11	FW	(Spain)	Isma Cerro										
19	FW	(Switzerland)	Neftali Manzambi	1						1			

Source: BDFútbol
Only competitive matches
(yellow card) = Number of bookings; (second yellow card) = Number of sending offs after a second yellow card; (red card) = Number of sending offs by a direct red card.

== Women's team ==
Real Sporting
2019–20 season
- Chairman: Javier Fernández
- Manager: Rafael Bernal
- Stadium: Pepe Ortiz
- Segunda División Pro: 16th
- Top goalscorer: League: All: Érika González (3 goals)
Home colours	Away colours

Real Sporting made their debut in the new second-tier league Segunda División Pro. The team gained their place after the withdrawal of Atlántida Matamá.

This was its 24th season ever, the 19th in the second tier.

=== Overview ===
On 3 January 2019, assistant coach Rafael Bernal replaced Ricardo Alonso as head coach.

Despite being in the last position, Real Sporting remained in the league after it ended prematurely due to the COVID-19 pandemic.

=== Squad ===
Note: Flags indicate national team as defined under FIFA eligibility rules; some limited exceptions apply. Players may hold more than one non-FIFA nationality.

No.	Pos.	Nation	Player
1	GK	ESP	Paula Madrazo
2	DF	ESP	Paz Sánchez
3	DF	ESP	Marta Nieto
4	DF	COL	Geraldyne Saavedra
5	DF	ESP	Eider Hidalgo
6	MF	ESP	Noelia Fernández
8	FW	ESP	Sheila Fernández
9	FW	ESP	Natalia Sobero
10	MF	ESP	Ichi
11	FW	ESP	Pañu
12	FW	ESP	Alba Fernández

No.	Pos.	Nation	Player
13	GK	ESP	Sheila Casasola
14	DF	ESP	Alba Álvarez
15	MF	ECU	Mayra Olvera
16	FW	ESP	Érika González
17	MF	ESP	Marta Rodríguez
18	DF	ESP	Lucía Ayuso
19	FW	ESP	Nuria Cueto
20	DF	ESP	Yaiza
21	FW	ESP	Irene Martínez
24	FW	ESP	Lucía Grande
26	DF	ESP	Lucía Hernández

=== League ===
==== League table ====
Group North
Pos	Team	Pld	W	D	L	GF	GA	GD	Pts
12	Atlético Madrid B	22	7	5	10	32	34	−2	26
13	Racing Santander	22	8	1	13	37	35	+2	25
14	Friol	22	6	1	15	25	55	−30	19
15	Pozuelo de Alarcón	22	4	1	17	12	40	−28	13
16	Sporting Gijón	22	2	2	18	12	64	−52	8

Source: RFEF
Rules for classification: 1) points; 2) head-to-head points; 3) goal difference; 4) number of goals scored

==== Results summary ====
Overall								Home						Away					
Pld	W	D	L	GF	GA	GD	Pts	W	D	L	GF	GA	GD	W	D	L	GF	GA	GD
22	2	2	18	12	64	−52	8	1	1	8	4	23	−19	1	1	10	8	41	−33

==== Positions by round ====
Round	1	2	3	4	5	6	7	8	9	10	11	12	13	14	15	16	17	18	19	20	21	22
Ground	H	A	H	A	H	A	H	A	H	A	H	A	H	A	A	A	H	A	H	A	H	A
Result	L	L	W	L	L	L	D	L	L	W	L	L	L	L	L	L	L	L	L	D	L	L
Position	15	16	14	15	15	15	16	16	16	16	16	16	16	16	16	16	16	16	16	16	16	16

Source: BDFútbol
A = Away; H = Home; W = Win; D = Draw; L = Loss

==== Matches ====
8 September 2019 1	Real Sporting	1–3	Parquesol	Gijón
	Ichi 72'	Report	Pascual 12'; Ali Rey 48', 65'	Stadium: Pepe Ortiz; Referee: Rodríguez Díaz

15 September 2019 2	Osasuna	4–0	Real Sporting	Pamplona
	Maite Garde 16'; Yaiza 26' (o.g.); Carrillo 81'; Iara 86'	Report		Stadium: Tajonar; Referee: Apesteguia Jiménez

22 September 2019 3	Real Sporting	2–1	Pozuelo de Alarcón	Gijón
	Irene 5'; Cueto 66'	Report	Carmen 43'	Stadium: Pepe Ortiz; Referee: Ovies García

28 September 2019 4	Madrid CFF B	2–0	Real Sporting	San Sebastián de los Reyes
	Giovana 28'; Susana López 86'	Report		Stadium: Matapiñonera; Referee: Espinosa Ríos

13 October 2019 5	Real Sporting	0–2	AEM	Gijón
		Report	Natalia 68', 78'	Stadium: Pepe Ortiz; Referee: Rodríguez Díaz

19 October 2019 6	Alavés	4–0	Real Sporting	Vitoria-Gasteiz
	Ane Miren 27'; Ortiz de Pinedo 63'; María 82'; Maialen Martínez 86'	Report		Stadium: José Luis Compañón; Referee: Alonso Fernández

27 October 2019 7	Real Sporting	1–1	Seagull	Gijón
	Irene 24'	Report	Nuria Garrote 39'	Stadium: Pepe Ortiz; Referee: Sangucho Barba

2 November 2019 8	Racing Santander	4–0	Real Sporting	Santa Cruz de Bezana
	Chamorro 26'; Silvia Martínez 40', 89'; Troccoli 54'	Report		Stadium: Municipal

10 November 2019 9	Real Sporting	0–1	Friol	Gijón
		Report	Fanny 2'	Stadium: Pepe Ortiz; Referee: Hortal Alonso

17 November 2019 10	Oviedo	0–1	Real Sporting	Oviedo
		Report	Érika 1'	Stadium: San Gregorio; Referee: Fernández Ceferino

24 November 2019 11	Real Sporting	0–1	Atlético Madrid B	Gijón
		Report	Elena 23'	Stadium: Pepe Ortiz

1 December 2019 12	Barcelona B	5–0	Real Sporting	Sant Joan Despí
	Jana 33'; Morató 38'; Arola 56'; Armengol 72'; Codina 76'	Report		Stadium: Joan Gamper; Referee: Guardia Ferrer

8 December 2019 13	Real Sporting	0–3	Athletic Bilbao B	Gijón
		Report	Sarriegi 32', 83'; Arana 74'	Stadium: Pepe Ortiz; Referee: Hortal Alonso

15 December 2019 14	Zaragoza CFF	5–3	Real Sporting	Villanueva de Gállego
	Morales 35'; Spitler 52'; Laura Martínez 57'; Williams 65'; Naima 89'	Report	Érika 47'; Ichi 79'; Alba Fernández 88'	Stadium: Enrique Porta; Referee: Ubico Lacasta

5 January 2020 15	Eibar	4–0	Real Sporting	Eibar
	Adule 8'; Sara Navarro 70' (pen.), 72', 89'	Report		Stadium: Unbe; Referee: Fuentes Menayo

12 January 2020 16	Parquesol	7–1	Real Sporting	Valladolid
	Isa Álvarez 19', 59'; Yari 22'; Carla 49'; Charle 57'; Sara Buitrago 72', 80'	Report	Erika 35'	Stadium: José Luis Saso; Referee: Martín Alonso

19 January 2020 17	Real Sporting	0–5	Osasuna	Gijón
		Report	Carrillo 3', 46'; Zugasti 13', 74' (pen.); Herrera 90'	Stadium: Pepe Ortiz; Referee: Ovies García

26 January 2020 18	Pozuelo de Alarcón	2–1	Real Sporting	Pozuelo de Alarcón
	Caballos 14'; Yuste 86' (pen.)	Report	Olvera 20'	Stadium: Valle de las Cañas; Referee: Calvo Valentín

2 February 2020 19	Real Sporting	0–2	Madrid CFF B	Gijón
		Report	Julia Hernández 36', 69'	Stadium: Pepe Ortiz; Referee: Hortal Alonso

9 February 2020 20	AEM	1–1	Real Sporting	Recasens
	Baradad 80'	Report	Jimena 22'	Stadium: Municipal; Referee: Mayer Calvo

22 February 2020 21	Real Sporting	0–4	Alavés	Gijón
		Report	Urbani 2', 67'; Ane Miren 14'; Kiskonen 22'	Stadium: Pepe Ortiz; Referee: Rodríguez Díaz

1 March 2020 22	Seagull	3–1	Real Sporting	Badalona
	Kuwahara 46'; Núria Garrote 63'; Uribe 85'	Report	Queralt 23' (o.g.)	Stadium: Nou Municipal; Referee: Borràs Polo

=== Appearances and goals ===
No.	Pos	Nat	Player	Total		Segunda Pro	
No.	Pos	Nat	Player	Apps	Goals	Apps	Goals
1	GK	(Spain) ESP	Paula Madrazo	17	0	17+0	0
2	DF	(Spain) ESP	Paz Sánchez	16	0	14+2	0
3	DF	(Spain) ESP	Marta Nieto	10	0	6+4	0
4	DF	(Colombia) COL	Geraldyne Saavedra	3	0	2+1	0
5	DF	(Spain) ESP	Eider Hidalgo	15	0	14+1	0
6	MF	(Spain) ESP	Noelia Fernández	21	0	20+1	0
8	FW	(Spain) ESP	Sheila Fernández	12	0	3+9	0
9	FW	(Spain) ESP	Natalia Sobero	18	0	6+12	0
10	MF	(Spain) ESP	Ichi	21	2	15+6	2
11	FW	(Spain) ESP	Pañu	22	1	22+0	1
12	FW	(Spain) ESP	Alba Fernández	20	1	18+2	1
13	GK	(Spain) ESP	Sheila Casasola	5	0	5+0	0
14	DF	(Spain) ESP	Alba Álvarez	16	0	6+10	0
15	MF	(Ecuador) ECU	Mayra Olvera	11	1	10+1	1
16	FW	(Spain) ESP	Érika González	18	3	16+2	3
17	MF	(Spain) ESP	Marta Sierra	7	0	6+1	0
18	DF	(Spain) ESP	Lucía Ayuso	9	0	8+1	0
19	FW	(Spain) ESP	Nuria Cueto	20	1	11+9	1
20	DF	(Spain) ESP	Yaiza	19	0	18+1	0
21	FW	(Spain) ESP	Irene Martínez	19	2	17+2	2
24	FW	(Spain) ESP	Lucía Granda	1	0	0+1	0
26	DF	(Spain) ESP	Lucía Hernández	1	0	0+1	0
Players who have left the club after the start of the season:
4	DF	(Spain) ESP	Pipa	4	0	4+0	0
17	FW	(Chile) CHI	Francisca Moroso	2	0	0+2	0
20	MF	(Chile) CHI	Keymer Toha	10	0	3+7	0

- Source: BDFútbol
