= 2013 Copa Argentina Final =

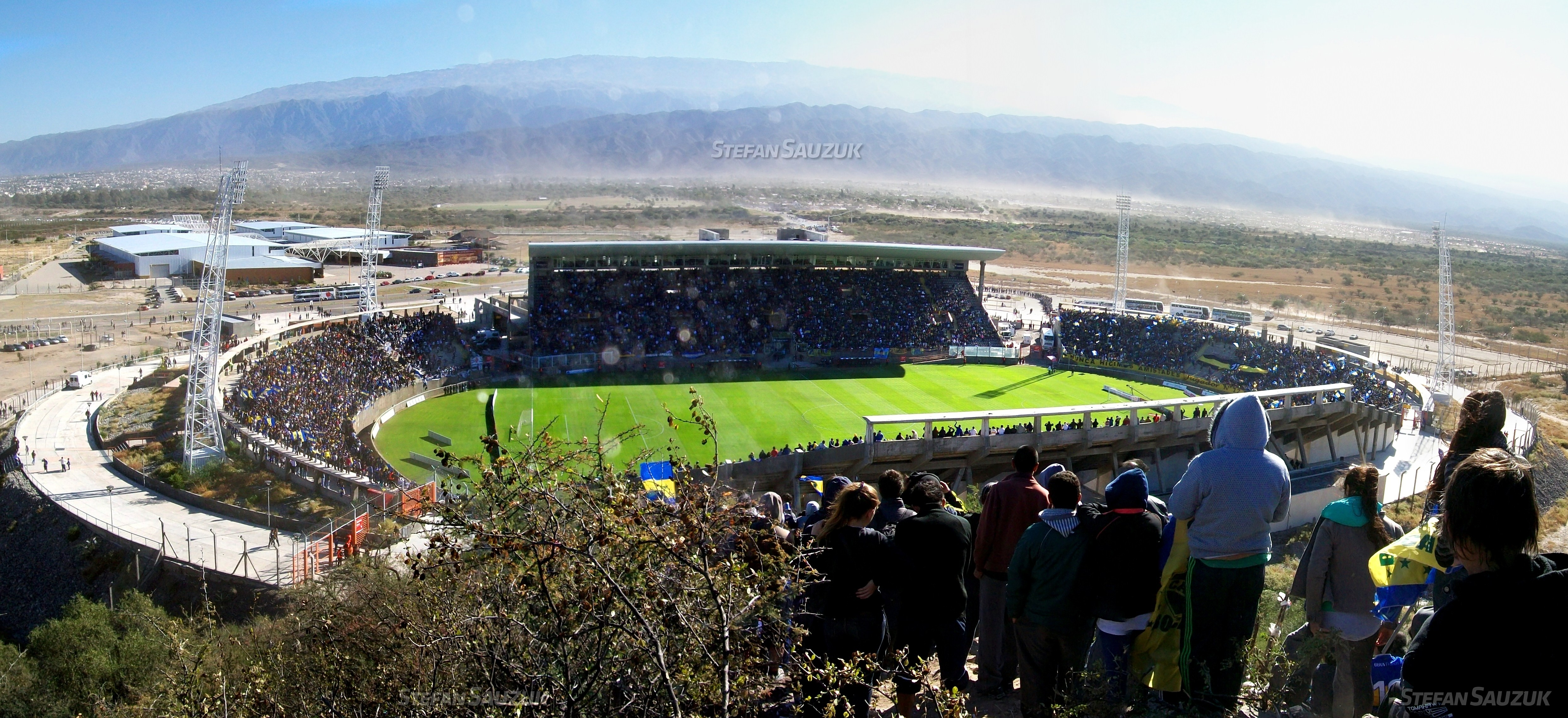
- Estadio del Bicentenario (Catamarca), venue
- Event: 2012-13 Copa Argentina Final
San Lorenzo	Arsenal
0	3
- Date: October 16, 2013
- Venue: Estadio Bicentenario, Catamarca
- Referee: Germán Delfino

The 2013 Copa Argentina Final was the 223rd and final match of the 2012–13 Copa Argentina. It was played on October 16, 2013 at the Estadio del Bicentenario de Catamarca between San Lorenzo and Arsenal. Arsenal won the match 3–0.

As champion, Arsenal qualified for the 2013 Supercopa Argentina and the 2014 Copa Libertadores.

== Qualified teams ==
Team	Previous finals app.
San Lorenzo	None
Arsenal	None

=== Road to the final ===
San Lorenzo			Round	Arsenal		
Opponent	Venue	Score		Opponent	Venue	Score
Bye			Round of 48	Santamarina	Florida	2–0
Deportivo Morón	Florida	0–0 (3–2 p)	Round of 32	Platense	Buenos Aires	3–1
Atlético de Rafaela	San Juan	3–0	Round of 16	Independiente	Catamarca	1–0
Gimnasia y Esgrima (CdU)	Resistencia	2–0	Quarterfinals	Godoy Cruz	San Juan	1–0
Estudiantes (BA)	Resistencia	1–1 (5–4 p)	Semifinals	All Boys	San Juan	1–1 (5–4 p)

== Match details ==
2012-13 Copa Argentina Final
October 16, 2013
20:10 (UTC−03:00)

San Lorenzo	0–3	Arsenal
	Report	Aguirre 36'; Echeverría 54'; Zelaya 66'

Estadio del Bicentenario, Catamarca
Referee: Germán Delfino

San Lorenzo	Arsenal

GK	12	(Argentina) Sebastián Torrico
DF	7	(Argentina) Julio Buffarini	(yellow card) 38'
DF	25	(Argentina) Pablo Alvarado (c)	(yellow card) 81'
DF	6	(Argentina) Santiago Gentiletti
DF	21	(Argentina) Emmanuel Más
MF	5	(Argentina) Juan Mercier	(yellow card) 75'
MF	20	(Paraguay) Néstor Ortigoza		(substituted off) 70'
MF	28	(Argentina) Ignacio Piatti	(red card) 44'
MF	11	(Argentina) Ángel Correa	(yellow card) 36'	(substituted off) 58'
MF	10	(Argentina) Leandro Romagnoli	(yellow card) 79'
FW	30	(Argentina) Gonzalo Verón		(substituted off) 61'
Substitutes:
GK	1	(Argentina) Cristian Álvarez
DF	2	(Argentina) Mauro Cetto
MF	14	(Argentina) Walter Kannemann
MF	19	(Argentina) Leandro Navarro		(substituted on) 70'
MF	16	(Argentina) Fernando Elizari		(substituted on) 61'
MF	22	(Argentina) Alan Ruiz
FW	15	(Argentina) Héctor Villalba		(substituted on) 58'
Manager:
(Argentina) (Spain) Juan Antonio Pizzi

GK	17	(Argentina) Cristian Campestrini	(yellow card) 45+2'
DF	4	(Argentina) Hugo Nervo (c)
DF	2	(Argentina) Mariano Echeverría	(yellow card) 19'
DF	6	(Argentina) Diego Braghieri
DF	15	(Argentina) Damián Pérez
MF	13	(Argentina) Matías Zaldivia
MF	5	(Argentina) Iván Marcone
MF	16	(Argentina) Fausto Montero	(yellow card) 35'	(substituted off) 53'
MF	19	(Argentina) Nicolás Aguirre		(substituted off) 67'
MF	21	(Argentina) Jonathan David Gómez		(substituted off) 53'
FW	9	(Argentina) Julio Furch
Substitutes:
GK	1	(Argentina) Alejandro Limia	(yellow card) 66'
MF	8	(Argentina) Gastón Esmerado
MF	23	(Argentina) Ramiro Carrera		(substituted on) 67'
MF	10	(Argentina) Martín Rolle		(substituted on) 53'
FW	11	(Argentina) Emilio Zelaya		(substituted on) 53'
FW	18	(Argentina) Milton Caraglio
MF	33	(Argentina) Mauricio Sperduti
Manager:
(Argentina) Gustavo Alfaro

Assistant referees:
Sergio Zoratti
Sergio Viola
Fourth official:
Fernando Rapallini

Match rules

- 90 minutes
- No extra time
- Penalty shoot-out if scores are level
- Seven named substitutes
- Maximum of three substitutions

=== Statistics ===
Overall
	San Lorenzo	Arsenal
Goals scored	0	3
Total shots	8	8
Shots on target	1	4
Ball possession	62%	38%
Corner kicks	3	2
Fouls committed	11	10
Offsides	1	3
Yellow cards	5	4
Red cards	1	0
