= César García (footballer, born 1999) =

Spanish footballer

Personal information
- Full name: César García Menéndez
- Date of birth: 27 August 1999 (age 27)
- Place of birth: Avilés, Spain
- Height: 1.78 m (5 ft 10 in)
- Position: Winger

Team information
- Current team: Marino Luanco
- Number: 22

Youth career
- Sporting Gijón
- Avilés
- 2017–2018: Sporting Gijón

Senior career*
Years	Team	Apps	(Gls)
2018–2022	Sporting Gijón B	68	(14)
2018–2019	→ Marino Luanco (loan)	33	(5)
2021–2022	Sporting Gijón	3	(0)
2022	Algeciras	9	(0)
2023	Real Avilés	14	(0)
2023–	Marino Luanco	31	(3)
- * Club domestic league appearances and goals as of 15 June 2025

César García Menéndez (born 27 August 1999) is a Spanish professional footballer who plays mainly as a right winger for Marino Luanco.

== Club career ==
Born in Avilés, Asturias, García represented Sporting de Gijón and Real Avilés CF as a youth. On 28 August 2018, after finishing his formation, he was loaned to Tercera División side Marino de Luanco, for one year.

García made his senior debut on 2 September 2018, coming on as a half-time substitute in a 0–4 away loss against CD Mosconia. He scored his first goal six days later by netting his team's second in a 3–0 home win over Caudal Deportivo, and finished the campaign with five goals in 38 appearances overall as his side narrowly missed out promotion in the play-offs.

Upon returning to the Rojiblancos, García renewed his contract until 2022 on 5 November 2019. He made his first team debut on 17 December, replacing Carlos Carmona in a 1–2 away loss against Zamora CF, for the season's Copa del Rey.

García's professional debut occurred on 12 November 2021, as he replaced fellow youth graduate Berto González in a 0–1 home loss against Real Sociedad B in the Segunda División championship.
