= Damián Pérez =

Argentine footballer

Personal information
- Full name: Damián Alfredo Pérez
- Date of birth: 22 December 1988 (age 37)
- Place of birth: Lanús, Buenos Aires, Argentina
- Height: 1.68 m (5 ft 6 in)
- Position: Left-back

Team information
- Current team: Arsenal de Sarandí

Youth career
- Arsenal de Sarandí

Senior career*
Years	Team	Apps	(Gls)
2007–2015	Arsenal de Sarandí	152	(3)
2015–2016	Vélez Sarsfield	23	(1)
2016–2018	Club Tijuana	73	(2)
2018	Colo-Colo	13	(0)
2019	San Lorenzo	5	(0)
2019–2020	Sporting Gijón	29	(0)
2020–2022	Godoy Cruz	38	(1)
2022–2023	Arsenal de Sarandí	37	(0)
2023–2025	Independiente	45	(0)
2025–2026	Defensa y Justicia	3	(0)
2026–	Arsenal de Sarandí	4	(0)
- * Club domestic league appearances and goals as of 18:24, 25 March 2026 (UTC)

Damián Alfredo Pérez (born 22 December 1988) is an Argentine professional footballer who plays for Primera B Metropolitana club Arsenal de Sarandí as a left-back.

== Career ==
Pérez started his professional career playing for Arsenal de Sarandí in a 1–4 defeat to Newell's Old Boys, on 16 March 2008, playing as a left winger. In the 2011 Clausura, he became a regular starter for Arsenal. Playing mainly as a left full back, Pérez totaled 13 games (12 as a starter).

The Argentine defender was also a regular starter for Arsenal in the team's first national league title, the 2012 Clausura, in which he played 17 games (all as a starter), scoring once (in the 14th fixture 4–1 victory over San Martín de San Juan). Pérez also started in the team's victory against Boca Juniors for the 2012 Supercopa Argentina (first edition of the tournament) and was a regular starter in the 2012–13 Copa Argentina winning campaign (including the 3–0 victory against San Lorenzo de Almagro in the final).

After playing 186 games with Arsenal de Sarandí (counting both domestic and international competitions), and despite being wanted by Argentine powerhouses Boca Juniors and River Plate, the full back joined Vélez Sarsfield on a free transfer for the second half of the 2015 Argentine Primera División.

On 18 July 2019, Pérez signed a two-year contract with Spanish club Sporting de Gijón. However, he moved to Godoy Cruz back in Argentina on 26 October 2020.

On 9 February 2022, Pérez returned to his former club, Arsenal de Sarandí, on a deal until the end of 2022.

== Career statistics ==
As of match played 20 July 2020

Appearances and goals by club, season and competition
Club	Season	League			National Cup		Continental		Other		Total	
Club	Season	Division	Apps	Goals	Apps	Goals	Apps	Goals	Apps	Goals	Apps	Goals
Arsenal de Sarandí	2007-08	Primera División	0	0	0	0	2	0	0	0	2	0
Arsenal de Sarandí	2008-09	Primera División	2	0	0	0	0	0	0	0	2	0
Arsenal de Sarandí	2009-10	Primera División	5	0	0	0	0	0	0	0	5	0
Arsenal de Sarandí	2010-11	Primera División	20	0	0	0	5	0	0	0	25	0
Arsenal de Sarandí	2011-12	Primera División	32	1	0	0	5	0	0	0	37	1
Arsenal de Sarandí	2012-13	Primera División	30	0	5	0	5	0	1 (Note: Appearances in Supercopa Argentina)	0	41	0
Arsenal de Sarandí	2013-14	Primera División	31	1	1	0	8	0	1	0	41	1
Arsenal de Sarandí	2014	Primera División	18	0	0	0	0	0	0	0	18	0
Arsenal de Sarandí	2015	Primera División	13	1	0	0	0	0	0	0	13	1
Arsenal de Sarandí	Total		151	3	6	0	25	0	2	0	184	3
Vélez Sarsfield	2015	Primera División	9	1	2	0	—				11	1
Vélez Sarsfield	2016	Primera División	14	0	1	0	—				15	0
Vélez Sarsfield	Total		23	1	3	0	0	0	0	0	26	1
Club Tijuana	2016-17	Liga MX	36	1	3	0	0	0	—		39	1
Club Tijuana	2017-18	Liga MX	37	1	4	1	4	0	—		45	2
Club Tijuana	Total		73	2	7	1	4	0	0	0	84	3
Colo-Colo	2018	Primera División	13	0	0	0	3	0	—		16	0
San Lorenzo	2018-19	Primera División	5	0	1	0	5	0	2 (Note: Appearances in Copa de la Superliga)	0	13	0
Sporting Gijón	2019-20	Segunda División	29	0	1	0	—				30	0
Career Total			294	6	18	1	37	0	4	0	353	7

== Honours ==
Arsenal de Sarandí

- Argentine Primera División (1): 2012 Clausura
- Copa Argentina (1): 2012–13
- Supercopa Argentina (1): 2012
