= Berto Espeso =

Spanish footballer

Personal information
- Full name: Alberto Espeso Fernández
- Date of birth: 10 March 1998 (age 28)
- Place of birth: Oviedo, Spain
- Height: 1.73 m (5 ft 8 in)
- Position: Left back

Team information
- Current team: Saguntino

Youth career
- 2005–2017: Sporting Gijón

Senior career*
Years	Team	Apps	(Gls)
2016–2020	Sporting Gijón B	24	(0)
2018–2020	Sporting Gijón	0	(0)
2020–2021	Córdoba	10	(0)
2021–2022	Salamanca UDS	15	(0)
2022	Inter Club d'Escaldes	12	(0)
2022–2023	Bergantiños	29	(2)
2023–2024	Lealtad	38	(0)
2024–	Saguntino	6	(1)
- * Club domestic league appearances and goals as of 13 October 2024

Alberto "Berto" Espeso Fernández (born 10 March 1998) is a Spanish professional footballer who plays for Saguntino as a left back.

== Club career ==
Born in Oviedo, Asturias, Espeso joined Sporting de Gijón's youth setup in 2005, aged seven. On 10 January 2016, he made his senior debut with the reserves by coming on as a second-half substitute in a 1–0 away win against CP Cacereño in the Segunda División B championship; it was his maiden appearance of the campaign, which ended in relegation.

Espeso was definitely promoted to the B-team ahead of the 2017–18 season, and renewed his contract on 21 October 2017. He made his first team debut on 6 December 2018, starting in a 2–2 away draw against SD Eibar, for the season's Copa del Rey.
