= Berto González =

Spanish footballer

Personal information
- Full name: Alberto González García
- Date of birth: 2 April 1998 (age 28)
- Place of birth: Avilés, Spain
- Height: 1.73 m (5 ft 8 in)
- Position: Winger

Team information
- Current team: Xerez Deportivo
- Number: 23

Youth career
- Avilés
- Sporting Gijón

Senior career*
Years	Team	Apps	(Gls)
2017–2021	Sporting Gijón B	86	(28)
2019–2022	Sporting Gijón	18	(0)
2022–2023	Alcorcón	29	(4)
2023–2024	Cultural Leonesa	24	(5)
2024–2025	Amorebieta	17	(1)
2025–2026	Numancia	11	(1)
2026–	Xerez Deportivo	7	(0)
- * Club domestic league appearances and goals as of 16 May 2026

Alberto "Berto" González García (born 2 April 1998), formerly known as Bertín, is a Spanish footballer who plays as a left winger for Segunda Federación club Xerez Deportivo.

== Club career ==
Born in Avilés, Asturias, González finished his formation with Sporting de Gijón, after a short stint at Real Avilés. He made his senior debut with the reserves on 23 April 2017, coming on as a second-half substitute for Isma Cerro in a 2–0 Tercera División home win against CD Llanes.

González scored his first senior goal on 20 August 2017, netting the game's only in a home defeat of Gernika Club, and he extended his contract with the club on 9 October. On 1 September 2019, he scored a brace in a 5–0 home routing of UD San Sebastián de los Reyes.

On 3 November 2019, González scored a hat-trick for the B's in a 4–2 home defeat of Real Madrid Castilla. He made his first team debut late in the month, replacing Aitor García in a 0–0 away draw against CD Mirandés in the Segunda División championship.

On 7 July 2022, free agent González signed a contract with Primera Federación side AD Alcorcón.

On 13 July 2024, Berto joined Amorebieta.
