= Isma Cerro =

Spanish footballer

Personal information
- Full name: Ismael Cerro Sánchez
- Date of birth: 7 July 1995 (age 31)
- Place of birth: Cáceres, Spain
- Height: 1.78 m (5 ft 10 in)
- Position: Winger

Team information
- Current team: Bergantiños
- Number: 19

Youth career
- 2004–2012: Diocesano
- 2012–2014: Real Madrid

Senior career*
Years	Team	Apps	(Gls)
2014–2016	Real Madrid C	8	(1)
2015–2016	→ Racing Santander (loan)	15	(0)
2016–2018	Sporting B	60	(18)
2018–2020	Sporting Gijón	10	(1)
2020	→ Badajoz (loan)	4	(0)
2020–2021	Andorra	0	(0)
2021	Guijuelo	18	(1)
2022–2023	Coria	38	(6)
2023–2024	Real Avilés	28	(2)
2024–2025	Marino de Luanco	33	(8)
2025–	Bergantiños	20	(1)
- * Club domestic league appearances and goals as of 25 February 2026

Ismael "Isma" Cerro Sánchez (born 7 July 1995) is a Spanish footballer who plays as a winger for Segunda Federación club Bergantiños.

== Club career ==
Born in Cáceres, Extremadura, Cerro joined Real Madrid's youth setup on 22 May 2012, after starting it out at CD Diocesano. He made his senior debut with the C-team on 22 March 2015, coming on as a late substitute in a 0–0 Tercera División away draw against CF Pozuelo de Alarcón.

Cerro scored his first senior goal on 12 April 2015, in a 1–2 home loss against CDA Navalcarnero. On 14 July, he was loaned to Segunda División B side Racing de Santander for one year.

On 21 July 2016, free agent Cerro moved to another reserve team, Sporting Gijón B in the fourth division. He was definitely promoted to the senior team in Segunda División ahead of the 2018–19 campaign, after agreeing to a new three-year contract.

Cerro made his professional debut on 18 October 2018, coming on as a late substitute for Pablo Pérez in a 1–1 away draw against CF Rayo Majadahonda, for the season's Copa del Rey, converting his kick in the 4–3 win on penalties. On 17 November, during the first minutes of the Asturian derby against Real Oviedo, he suffered a knee injury that forced him to miss the remainder of the season.

Cerro returned to action on 4 September 2019, coming on as substitute in a 2–0 home win against Albacete Balompié. He scored his first goal as a professional on 27 October, netting the opener in a 4–0 home routing of Real Zaragoza.

On 30 January 2020, after playing only eight matches in the first half of the season, Cerro was loaned to third division side CD Badajoz for six months. On 17 September 2020, Isma moved to FC Andorra on a deal until June 2021. After only one cup game for Andorra, Cerro moved to CD Guijuelo on 4 January 2021.
